= 1902 Boston Americans season =

Major League Baseball season

1902 Boston Americans
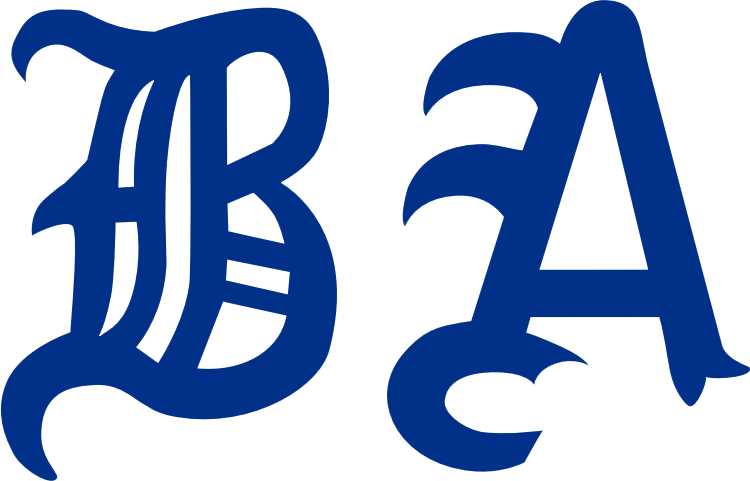
- League: American League
- Ballpark: Huntington Avenue Grounds
- City: Boston, Massachusetts
- Record: 77–60 (.562)
- League place: 3rd
- Owners: Charles Somers
- President: Charles Somers
- Managers: Jimmy Collins
- Stats: ESPN.com; Baseball Reference

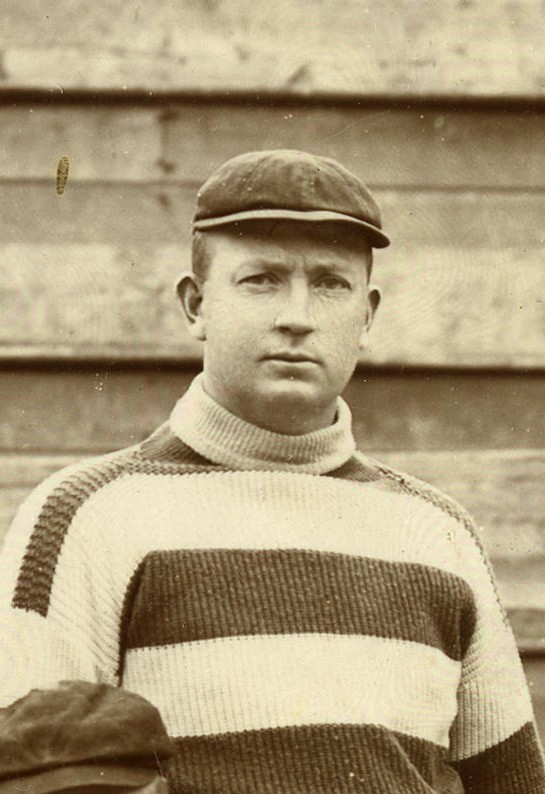
Opening Day starting pitcher Cy Young

The 1902 Boston Americans season was the second season for the professional baseball franchise that later became known as the Boston Red Sox. The Americans finished third in the American League (AL) with a record of 77 wins and 60 losses, 6 1/2 games behind the Philadelphia Athletics. The team was managed by Jimmy Collins and played its home games at Huntington Avenue Grounds.

== Offseason and Spring Training ==
The Americans bolstered their pitching by recruiting Bill Dinneen, who jumped from the Boston Beaneaters. Dinneen and Cy Young would become the "one-two" pitching combination for the Boston Americans.

Prior to the regular season, the team held spring training in Augusta, Georgia.

=== Transactions ===
- November 21, 1901: The Americans make a trade with the Cleveland Blues, with catcher Osee Schrecongost sent to Cleveland in return for George LaChance.
- December 16, 1901: It is reported that Jack Warner, catcher with the New York Giants, met with Jimmy Collins and signed a contract with the Boston Americans.
- December 17, 1901: Charlie Hickman signs with the Boston Americans.
- February 24, 1902: Outfielder Patsy Dougherty announces that he has signed to play for the Boston Americans.
- March 15, 1902: Pitcher Bert Husting, who played for the Milwaukee Brewers in the 1901 season, signs a $2700 contract to play for the Boston Americans.

== Regular season ==
=== Season Log ===
Boston Win	Boston Loss	Tie

1902 Boston Americans Season Log: 77─60─1
April

#	Date	Opponent	Score	Win	Loss	Save	Record	Source
1	April 19	Vs. Baltimore	6─7	Cy Young (1─0)	Tom Hughes (0─1)	─	1─0	
2	April 23	@ Washington	3─7	Al Orth (1─0)	Bill Dinneen (0─1)	─	1─1	
3	April 24	@ Washington	11─3	Cy Young (2─0)	Bill Carrick (0─1)	─	2─1	
4	April 25	@ Washington	4─15	Happy Townsend (1─0)	Bert Husting (0─1)	─	2─2	
5	April 26	@ Washington	7─15	Wyatt Lee (1─0)	Bill Dinneen (0─2)	─	2─3	
6	April 28	@ Baltimore	7─3	Cy Young (3─0)	Joe McGinnity (0─2)	─	3─3	
7	April 30	@ Baltimore	4─5	Tom Hughes (2─1)	George Winter (0─1)	─	3─4	

May

#	Date	Opponent	Score	Win	Loss	Save	Record	Source
8	May 1	@ Baltimore	6─4	Bill Dinneen (1─2)	Harry Howell (1─1)	─	4─4	
9	May 2	Vs. Baltimore	14─6	Joe McGinnity (1─2)	Cy Young (3─1)	─	4─5	
10	May 3	Vs. Baltimore	1─10	Cy Young (4─1)	Charlie Shields (0─1)	─	5─5	
11	May 5	Vs. Baltimore	2─5	George Winter (1─1)	Tom Hughes (2─2)	─	6─5	
12	May 6	Vs. Baltimore	4─5	Bill Dinneen (2─2)	Frank Foreman (0─1)	─	7─5	
13	May 7	Vs. Washington	8─12	Cy Young (5─1)	Happy Townsend (1─2)	─	8─5	
14	May 8	Vs. Washington	5─1	Casey Patten (3─0)	George Winter (1─2)	─	8─6	
15	May 9	Vs. Washington	5─4	Wyatt Lee (2─1)	Bill Dinneen (2─3)	─	8─7	
16	May 10	Vs. Washington	1─3	Cy Young (6─1)	Al Orth (1─3)	─	9─7	
17	May 12	@ Philadelphia	8─2	George Winter (2─2)	Eddie Plank (1─4)	─	10─7	
18	May 14	@ Philadelphia	1─5	Bert Husting (4─1)	Bill Dinneen (2─4)	─	10─8	
19	May 15	@ Philadelphia	6─3	Cy Young (7─1)	Eddie Plank (1─5)	─	11─8	
20	May 16	Vs. Philadelphia	2─4	George Winter (3─2)	Snake Wiltse (3─1)	─	12─8	
21	May 17	Vs. Philadelphia	7─5	Bert Husting (5─1)	Bill Dinneen (2─5)	─	12─9	
22	May 20	Vs. Philadelphia	1─2	Cy Young (8─1)	Eddie Plank (1─6)	─	13─9	
23	May 21	Vs. Chicago	2─1	Wiley Piatt (3─1)	George Winter (3─3)	─	13─10	
24	May 22	Vs Chicago	4─3	Ned Garvin (3─2)	Bill Dinneen (2─6)	─	13─11	
25	May 23	Vs Chicago	3─6	Cy Young (9─1)	Clark Griffith (3─2)	─	14─11	
26	May 24	Vs Chicago	3─5	George Winter (4─3)	Wiley Piatt (3─2)	─	15─11	
27	May 26	Vs St. Louis	3─0	Jack Powell (3─4)	Bill Dinneen (2─7)	─	15─12	
28	May 27	Vs St. Louis	2─6	Cy Young (10─1)	Bill Reidy (1─2)	─	16─12	
29	May 28	Vs St. Louis	2─6	George Winter (5─3)	Jack Harper (5─2)	─	17─12	
30	May 29	Vs. St. Louis	2─6	Bill Dinneen (3─7)	Red Donahue (3─3)	─	18─12	
31	May 30 (1)	Vs. Detroit	10─5	Roscoe Miller (5─4)	Fred Mitchell (0─1)	─	18─13	
32	May 30 (2)	Vs. Detroit	0─12	Cy Young (11─1)	Win Mercer (4─4)	─	19─13	
33	May 31	Vs. Detroit	13─7	Joe Yeager (3─1)	George Winter (5─4)	─	19─14	

=== Season Highlights ===
- April 19: The season opens with a 7–6 home win over the Baltimore Orioles.
- June 28: A forfeit is declared in Boston's favor during a road game against the Orioles. With Boston leading, 9–4 in the eighth inning, umpire Tom Connolly called a Baltimore runner out for missing second base. The call was argued by Baltimore manager John McGraw, resulting in his ejection. After McGraw refused to leave the field, Connolly forfeited the game to Boston.
- July 8: In their highest-scoring game of the year, Boston loses at home to the Philadelphia Athletics, 22–9.
- July 9: The team's longest game of the season ends as a 4–2 loss in 15 innings to the visiting Athletics.
- July 19: The team's longest losing streak of the season, six games between July 12 and 18, comes to an end with a victory over the visiting Chicago White Stockings.
- July 29: The team's longest winning streak of the season, eight games between July 19 and 28, comes to an end with a loss to the visiting Detroit Tigers.
- September 29: The season ends with a 9–5 road win over the Orioles. This was the last game the Orioles played at Oriole Park in Baltimore; in 1903, they relocated to New York City as the Highlanders, then in 1913 became known as the New York Yankees.

=== Transactions ===
- June 2: Fred Mitchell loaned to the Philadelphia Athletics.
- June 3: Charlie Hickman sold to the Cleveland Indians.
- July 11: Pitcher Tom Hughes joins Boston from the Baltimore Orioles.
- July 23: Manager Jimmy Collins signs pitcher Tully Sparks.

=== Statistical leaders ===
The offense was led by Buck Freeman, who hit 11 home runs and had 121 RBIs, and Patsy Dougherty with a .342 batting average. The pitching staff was led by Cy Young, who made 45 appearances (43 starts) and pitched 41 complete games with a 32–11 record and 2.15 ERA, while striking out 160 in 384 2/3 innings.

=== Season standings ===
American League
Team	W	L	Pct.	GB	Home	Road
Philadelphia Athletics	83	53	.610	—	56‍–‍17	27‍–‍36
St. Louis Browns	78	58	.574	5	49‍–‍21	29‍–‍37
Boston Americans	77	60	.562	6½	43‍–‍27	34‍–‍33
Chicago White Stockings	74	60	.552	8	48‍–‍20	26‍–‍40
Cleveland Bronchos	69	67	.507	14	40‍–‍25	29‍–‍42
Washington Senators	61	75	.449	22	40‍–‍28	21‍–‍47
Detroit Tigers	52	83	.385	30½	34‍–‍33	18‍–‍50
Baltimore Orioles	50	88	.362	34	32‍–‍31	18‍–‍57

The team had one game end in a tie; August 18 vs. Detroit Tigers. Tie games are not counted in league standings, but player statistics during tie games are counted.

=== Record vs. opponents ===
1902 American League record Sources:
Team	BAL	BOS	CWS	CLE	DET	PHA	SLB	WSH
Baltimore	—	4–16	8–11–1	9–11	10–10	6–13	2–18–1	11–9–1
Boston	16–4	—	12–8	6–14	11–7–1	9–11	15–5	8–11
Chicago	11–8–1	8–12	—	12–7	12–7–1	10–10	9–9–1	12–7–1
Cleveland	11–9	14–6	7–12	—	8–10	8–12	9–10–1	12–8
Detroit	10–10	7–11–1	7–12–1	10–8	—	4–16	5–15	9–11
Philadelphia	13–6	11–9	10–10	12–8	16–4	—	9–10–1	12–6
St. Louis	18–2–1	5–15	9–9–1	10–9–1	15–5	10–9–1	—	11–9
Washington	9–11–1	11–8	7–12–1	8–12	11–9	6–12	9–11	—

=== Opening Day lineup ===
Freddy Parent	SS
Chick Stahl	CF
Jimmy Collins	3B
Buck Freeman	RF
Charlie Hickman	LF
Candy LaChance	1B
Hobe Ferris	2B
Lou Criger	C
Cy Young	P

=== Roster ===
1902 Boston Americans
Roster
Pitchers: Doc Adkins; Nick Altrock; Pep Deininger; Bill Dinneen; Tom Hughes; Bert Husting; Fred Mitchell; George Prentiss; Tully Sparks; Dave Williams; George Winter; Cy Young	Catchers: Lou Criger; Jack Warner; Infielders: Jimmy Collins; Hobe Ferris; Harry Gleason; Candy LaChance; Freddy Parent; Gary Wilson	Outfielders: Patsy Dougherty; Buck Freeman; Charlie Hickman; Chick Stahl	Manager: Jimmy Collins

== Player stats ==
=== Batting ===
Note: Pos=Position; GP=Games played; AB=At bats; R=Runs; H=Hits; 2B=Doubles; 3B=Triples; HR=Home runs; RBI=Runs batted in; BB=Walks; AVG=Batting average; OBP=On base percentage; SLG=Slugging percentage

==== Starters By Position ====
Pos	Player	GP	AB	R	H	2B	3B	HR	RBI	BB	AVG	OBP	SLG	Reference
C	Lou Criger	83	266	32	68	16	6	0	28	26	.256	.322	.361	
1B	Candy LaChance	138	541	60	151	13	4	6	56	18	.279	.310	.351	
2B	Hobe Ferris	133	496	56	121	16	14	8	63	22	.244	.277	.381	
SS	Freddy Parent	138	565	91	156	31	8	3	62	24	.276	.311	.375	
3B	Jimmy Collins	108	429	71	138	21	10	6	61	26	.322	.363	.459	
OF	Patsy Dougherty	108	437	77	150	12	6	0	34	39	.343	.405	.398	
OF	Buck Freeman	138	563	75	174	38	19	11	121	32	.309	.353	.503	
OF	Chick Stahl	128	510	92	164	22	11	2	58	39	.322	.375	.420	

==== Other Batters ====
Note: Pos=Position; GP=Games played; AB=At bats; R=Runs; H=Hits; 2B=Doubles; 3B=Triples; HR=Home runs; RBI=Runs batted in; BB=Walks; AVG=Batting average; OBP=On base percentage; SLG=Slugging percentage

Pos	Player	GP	AB	R	H	2B	3B	HR	RBI	BB	AVG	OBP	SLG	Reference
IF/OF	Harry Gleason	71	240	30	54	5	5	2	25	9	.225	.262	.313	
C	Jack Warner	65	222	19	52	5	7	0	12	12	.234	.283	.320	
LF	Charlie Hickman	28	108	13	32	5	2	3	16	3	.296	.339	.463	
2B	Gary Wilson	3	11	1	2	0	0	0	1	1	.182	.250	.182	

==== Pitchers ====
Note: GP=Games played; AB=At bats; R=Runs; H=Hits; 2B=Doubles; 3B=Triples; HR=Home runs; RBI=Runs batted in; BB=Walks; AVG=Batting average; OBP=On base percentage; SLG=Slugging percentage

Player	GP	AB	R	H	2B	3B	HR	RBI	BB	AVG	OBP	SLG	Reference
Cy Young	45	148	17	34	4	1	1	12	5	.230	.255	.291	
Bill Dinneen	44	141	13	18	3	0	0	9	11	.128	.201	.149	
George Winter	20	61	5	10	0	0	0	1	3	.164	.203	.164	
Tully Sparks	17	52	2	8	2	0	0	5	5	.154	.228	.192	
Tom Hughes	12	31	7	11	1	0	0	3	2	.355	.394	.387	
George Prentiss	7	16	1	5	0	0	0	2	0	.313	.313	.313	
Doc Adkins	4	9	1	2	0	0	0	0	0	.222	.222	.222	
Dave Williams	3	9	0	3	0	0	0	2	1	.333	.400	.333	
Nick Altrock	3	8	0	0	0	0	0	0	0	.000	.000	.000	
Pep Deininger	2	6	0	2	1	1	0	0	0	.333	.333	.833	
Bert Husting	1	4	1	1	0	1	0	1	0	.250	.250	.750	
Fred Mitchell	1	1	0	0	0	0	0	0	0	.000	.000	.000	

=== Pitching ===
Note: G=Games Played; GS=Games Started; IP=Innings Pitched; H=Hits; BB=Walks; R=Runs; ER=Earned Runs; SO=Strikeouts; W=Wins; L=Losses; SV=Saves; ERA=Earned Run Average

==== Starting Pitchers ====
Player	G	GS	IP	H	BB	R	ER	SO	W	L	SV	ERA	Reference
Cy Young	45	43	385 2/3	350	53	136	92	165	32	11	0	2.15	
Bill Dinneen	42	42	371 1/3	348	99	155	121	142	21	21	0	2.93	
George Winter	20	20	168 1/3	149	53	77	56	48	11	9	0	2.99	
Tully Sparks	17	15	142 2/3	151	40	83	55	37	7	9	0	3.47	
Tom Hughes	9	8	48 1/3	51	25	31	18	16	3	3	0	3.35	
George Prentiss	7	4	41	55	10	31	24	9	2	2	0	5.27	
Doc Adkins	4	2	20	30	7	20	9	3	1	1	0	4.05	
Nick Altrock	3	2	18	19	7	13	4	5	0	2	1	2.00	
Pep Deininger	2	1	12	19	9	16	13	2	0	0	0	9.75	
Bert Husting	1	1	8	15	8	15	8	4	0	1	0	9.00	

==== Relief Pitchers ====
Note: G=Games Played; GS=Games Started; IP=Innings Pitched; H=Hits; BB=Walks; R=Runs; ER=Earned Runs; SO=Strikeouts; W=Wins; L=Losses; SV=Saves; ERA=Earned Run Average

Player	G	GS	IP	H	BB	R	ER	SO	W	L	SV	ERA	Reference
Dave Williams	3	0	18 2/3	22	11	18	11	7	0	0	0	5.30	
Fred Mitchell	1	0	4	8	5	5	5	2	0	1	0	11.25	
