= 1902 Philadelphia Athletics season =

1902 Philadelphia Athletics
- American League champions
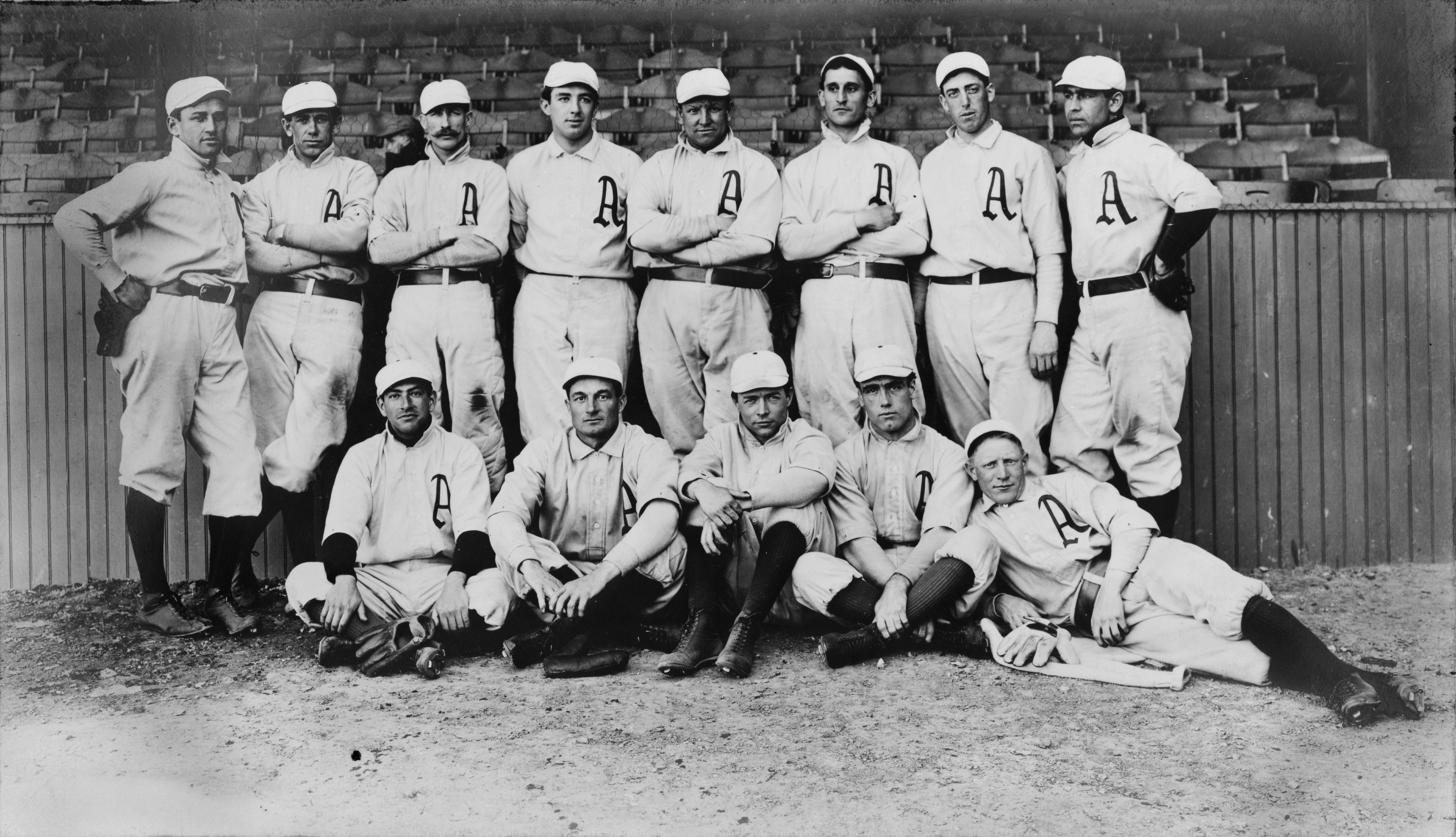
- League: American League
- Ballpark: Columbia Park
- City: Philadelphia
- Record: 83–53 (.610)
- League place: 1st
- Owners: Benjamin Shibe, Tom Shibe, John Shibe, Connie Mack, Sam Jones, Frank Hough
- Managers: Connie Mack

The 1902 Philadelphia Athletics season was a season in American baseball. The team finished first in the American League with a record of 83 wins and 53 losses.

== Regular season ==
In 1902, the Philadelphia Phillies obtained an injunction, effective only in Pennsylvania, barring Athletics' second baseman Nap Lajoie from playing baseball for any team other than the Phillies. Lajoie had played for the Athletics in 1901, and appeared in just one game in 1902 before the injunction went into effect. The American League responded by transferring Lajoie's contract to the Cleveland Bronchos, who were subsequently known as the "Naps" in Lajoie's honor for several seasons.

Following the A's pennant winning season, the Philadelphia Inquirer organized a championship parade for the team through the city on Monday night, September 30, 1902. The team proceeded in open carriages and were reviewed by Philadelphia Mayor Ashbridge in front of the Inquirer's building on Market Street. "There were more than 25,000 base ball enthusiasts from Philadelphia and nearly every town within a radius of twenty miles of the city in the parade. A thousand effigies of the "white elephant" were carried by the paraders. There were fifteen bands and twenty fife and drum corps in line to furnish music for the marchers." It was estimated that more than 200,000 turned out for the parade.

=== Season standings ===
American League
Team	W	L	Pct.	GB	Home	Road
Philadelphia Athletics	83	53	.610	—	56‍–‍17	27‍–‍36
St. Louis Browns	78	58	.574	5	49‍–‍21	29‍–‍37
Boston Americans	77	60	.562	6½	43‍–‍27	34‍–‍33
Chicago White Stockings	74	60	.552	8	48‍–‍20	26‍–‍40
Cleveland Bronchos	69	67	.507	14	40‍–‍25	29‍–‍42
Washington Senators	61	75	.449	22	40‍–‍28	21‍–‍47
Detroit Tigers	52	83	.385	30½	34‍–‍33	18‍–‍50
Baltimore Orioles	50	88	.362	34	32‍–‍31	18‍–‍57

=== Record vs. opponents ===
1902 American League record Sources:
Team	BAL	BOS	CWS	CLE	DET	PHA	SLB	WSH
Baltimore	—	4–16	8–11–1	9–11	10–10	6–13	2–18–1	11–9–1
Boston	16–4	—	12–8	6–14	11–7–1	9–11	15–5	8–11
Chicago	11–8–1	8–12	—	12–7	12–7–1	10–10	9–9–1	12–7–1
Cleveland	11–9	14–6	7–12	—	8–10	8–12	9–10–1	12–8
Detroit	10–10	7–11–1	7–12–1	10–8	—	4–16	5–15	9–11
Philadelphia	13–6	11–9	10–10	12–8	16–4	—	9–10–1	12–6
St. Louis	18–2–1	5–15	9–9–1	10–9–1	15–5	10–9–1	—	11–9
Washington	9–11–1	11–8	7–12–1	8–12	11–9	6–12	9–11	—

=== Roster ===
1902 Philadelphia Athletics
Roster
Pitchers: Bill Bernhard; Andy Coakley; Bill Duggleby; Bert Husting; Ed Kenna; Fred Mitchell; Eddie Plank; Odie Porter; Tad Quinn; Rube Waddell; Tom Walker; Highball Wilson; Snake Wiltse	Catchers: Doc Powers; Ossee Schreckengost; Farmer Steelman; Infielders: Frank Bonner; Lou Castro; Lave Cross; Monte Cross; Harry Davis; Nap Lajoie; Danny Murphy	Outfielders: Elmer Flick; Dave Fultz; Topsy Hartsel; Socks Seybold	Manager: Connie Mack

== Player stats ==
=== Batting ===
==== Starters by position ====
Note: Pos = Position; G = Games played; AB = At bats; H = Hits; Avg. = Batting average; HR = Home runs; RBI = Runs batted in

Pos	Player	G	AB	H	Avg.	HR	RBI
C	Ossee Schreckengost	79	284	92	.324	2	43
1B	Harry Davis	133	561	172	.307	6	92
2B	Danny Murphy	76	291	91	.313	1	48
SS	Monte Cross	137	497	115	.231	3	59
3B	Lave Cross	137	559	191	.342	0	108
OF	Topsy Hartsel	137	545	154	.283	5	58
OF	Socks Seybold	137	522	165	.316	16	97
OF	Dave Fultz	129	506	153	.302	1	49

==== Other batters ====
Note: G = Games played; AB = At bats; H = Hits; Avg. = Batting average; HR = Home runs; RBI = Runs batted in

Player	G	AB	H	Avg.	HR	RBI
Doc Powers	71	246	65	.264	2	39
Lou Castro	42	143	35	.245	1	15
Frank Bonner	11	44	8	.182	0	3
Elmer Flick	11	37	11	.297	0	3
Farmer Steelman	10	32	6	.188	0	6
Nap Lajoie	1	4	1	.250	0	1

=== Pitching ===
==== Starting pitchers ====
Note: G = Games pitched; IP = Innings pitched; W = Wins; L = Losses; ERA = Earned run average; SO = Strikeouts

Player	G	IP	W	L	ERA	SO
Eddie Plank	36	300.0	20	15	3.30	107
Rube Waddell	33	276.1	24	7	2.05	210
Bert Husting	32	204.0	14	5	3.79	44
Snake Wiltse	19	138.0	8	8	5.15	28
Fred Mitchell	18	107.2	5	8	3.59	22
Andy Coakley	3	27.0	2	1	2.67	9
Bill Duggleby	2	17.0	1	1	3.18	4
Bill Bernhard	1	9.0	1	0	1.00	1
Tad Quinn	1	8.0	0	1	4.50	3
Tom Walker	1	8.0	0	1	5.62	2
Odie Porter	1	8.0	0	1	3.38	2

==== Other pitchers ====
Note: G = Games pitched; IP = Innings pitched; W = Wins; L = Losses; ERA = Earned run average; SO = Strikeouts

Player	G	IP	W	L	ERA	SO
Highball Wilson	13	96.1	7	5	2.43	18
Ed Kenna	2	17.0	1	1	5.29	5
