= 1902 Cleveland Bronchos season =

1902 Cleveland Bronchos
- League: American League
- Ballpark: League Park
- City: Cleveland, Ohio
- Record: 69–57 (.548)
- League place: 5th
- Owners: Charles Somers
- Managers: Bill Armour

The 1902 Cleveland Bronchos season was a season in American baseball. The team, known during this season as the "Bronchos" (or "Broncos"), finished in fifth place in the American League with a record of 69–67, 14 games behind the Philadelphia Athletics.

== Regular season ==
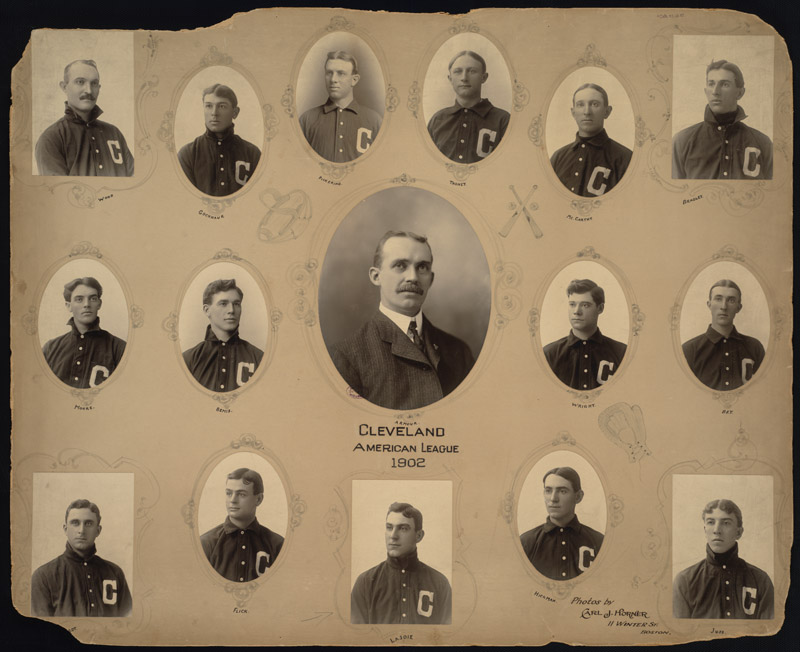
The Cleveland team in 1902

In 1902, the National League's Philadelphia Phillies obtained an injunction, effective only in Pennsylvania, barring Nap Lajoie from playing baseball for any team other than the Phillies. The American League responded by transferring Lajoie's contract to the Cleveland Indians, then known unofficially as the Bronchos and subsequently renamed the "Naps" in Lajoie's honor for several seasons.

=== Season standings ===
American League
Team	W	L	Pct.	GB	Home	Road
Philadelphia Athletics	83	53	.610	—	56‍–‍17	27‍–‍36
St. Louis Browns	78	58	.574	5	49‍–‍21	29‍–‍37
Boston Americans	77	60	.562	6½	43‍–‍27	34‍–‍33
Chicago White Stockings	74	60	.552	8	48‍–‍20	26‍–‍40
Cleveland Bronchos	69	67	.507	14	40‍–‍25	29‍–‍42
Washington Senators	61	75	.449	22	40‍–‍28	21‍–‍47
Detroit Tigers	52	83	.385	30½	34‍–‍33	18‍–‍50
Baltimore Orioles	50	88	.362	34	32‍–‍31	18‍–‍57

=== Record vs. opponents ===
1902 American League record Sources:
Team	BAL	BOS	CWS	CLE	DET	PHA	SLB	WSH
Baltimore	—	4–16	8–11–1	9–11	10–10	6–13	2–18–1	11–9–1
Boston	16–4	—	12–8	6–14	11–7–1	9–11	15–5	8–11
Chicago	11–8–1	8–12	—	12–7	12–7–1	10–10	9–9–1	12–7–1
Cleveland	11–9	14–6	7–12	—	8–10	8–12	9–10–1	12–8
Detroit	10–10	7–11–1	7–12–1	10–8	—	4–16	5–15	9–11
Philadelphia	13–6	11–9	10–10	12–8	16–4	—	9–10–1	12–6
St. Louis	18–2–1	5–15	9–9–1	10–9–1	15–5	10–9–1	—	11–9
Washington	9–11–1	11–8	7–12–1	8–12	11–9	6–12	9–11	—

=== Notable transactions ===
- May 31, 1902: Nap Lajoie was signed as a free agent by the Cleveland club.

=== Roster ===
1902 Cleveland Bronchos
Roster
Pitchers: Bill Bernhard; Ginger Clark; Gus Dorner; Otto Hess; Addie Joss; Dummy Leitner; Jack Lundbom; Earl Moore; Lou Polchow; Charlie Smith; Oscar Streit; Dummy Taylor; Dike Varney; Cal Vasbinder; Ed Walker; Gene Wright	Catchers: Harry Bemis; George Starnagle; Bob Wood; Infielders: Frank Bonner; Bill Bradley; John Gochnaur; Peaches Graham; Charlie Hickman; Nap Lajoie; Hal O'Hagan; Ossee Schreckengost; Jack Thoney	Outfielders: Harry Bay; Elmer Flick; Zaza Harvey; Charlie Hemphill; Jack McCarthy; Ollie Pickering	Manager: Bill Armour

== Player stats ==
=== Batting ===
==== Starters by position ====
Note: Pos = Position; G = Games played; AB = At bats; H = Hits; Avg. = Batting average; HR = Home runs; RBI = Runs batted in

Pos	Player	G	AB	H	Avg.	HR	RBI
C	Harry Bemis	93	317	99	.312	1	29
1B	Charlie Hickman	102	426	161	.378	8	94
2B	Nap Lajoie	86	348	132	.379	7	64
SS	John Gochnaur	127	459	85	.185	0	37
3B	Bill Bradley	137	550	187	.340	11	77
OF	Elmer Flick	110	424	126	.297	2	61
OF	Jack McCarthy	95	359	102	.284	0	41
OF	Harry Bay	108	455	132	.290	0	23

==== Other batters ====
Note: G = Games played; AB = At bats; H = Hits; Avg. = Batting average; HR = Home runs; RBI = Runs batted in

Player	G	AB	H	Avg.	HR	RBI
Ollie Pickering	69	293	75	.256	3	26
Bob Wood	81	258	76	.295	0	40
Frank Bonner	34	132	37	.280	0	14
Jack Thoney	28	103	30	.286	0	11
Charlie Hemphill	25	94	25	.266	0	11
Ossee Schrecongost	18	74	25	.338	0	9
Zaza Harvey	12	46	16	.348	0	5
Hal O'Hagan	3	13	5	.385	0	1
Peaches Graham	2	6	2	.333	0	1
George Starnagle	1	3	0	.000	0	0

=== Pitching ===
==== Starting pitchers ====
Note: G = Games pitched; IP = Innings pitched; W = Wins; L = Losses; ERA = Earned run average; SO = Strikeouts

Player	G	IP	W	L	ERA	SO
Earl Moore	36	293.0	17	18	2.95	84
Addie Joss	32	269.1	17	13	2.77	106
Bill Bernhard	27	217.0	17	5	2.20	57
Gene Wright	21	148.0	7	10	3.95	52
Oscar Streit	8	51.2	0	7	5.23	10
Gus Dorner	4	36.0	3	1	1.25	5
Luther Taylor	4	34.0	1	3	1.59	8
Charlie Smith	3	20.0	2	1	4.05	5
Dike Varney	3	14.2	1	1	6.14	7
Lou Polchow	1	8.0	0	1	5.63	2
Ed Walker	1	8.0	0	1	3.38	1
Charlie Hickman	1	8.0	0	1	7.88	1
George Leitner	1	8.0	0	0	4.50	0

==== Other pitchers ====
Note: G = Games pitched; IP = Innings pitched; W = Wins; L = Losses; ERA = Earned run average; SO = Strikeouts

Player	G	IP	W	L	ERA	SO
Otto Hess	7	43.2	2	4	5.98	13
Jack Lundbom	8	34.0	1	1	6.62	7

==== Relief pitchers ====
Note: G = Games pitched; W = Wins; L = Losses; SV = Saves; ERA = Earned run average; SO = Strikeouts

Player	G	W	L	SV	ERA	SO
Cal Vasbinder	2	0	0	0	9.00	2
Ginger Clark	1	1	0	0	6.00	1
