= 1902 Chicago White Stockings season =

1902 Chicago White Stockings
- League: American League
- Ballpark: South Side Park
- City: Chicago, Illinois
- Record: 74–60 (.552)
- League place: 4th
- Owners: Charles Comiskey
- Managers: Clark Griffith

The 1902 Chicago White Stockings season was a season in American baseball. The White Sox had a record of 74–60, finishing in fourth place in the American League.

== Regular season ==
=== Season standings ===
American League
Team	W	L	Pct.	GB	Home	Road
Philadelphia Athletics	83	53	.610	—	56‍–‍17	27‍–‍36
St. Louis Browns	78	58	.574	5	49‍–‍21	29‍–‍37
Boston Americans	77	60	.562	6½	43‍–‍27	34‍–‍33
Chicago White Stockings	74	60	.552	8	48‍–‍20	26‍–‍40
Cleveland Bronchos	69	67	.507	14	40‍–‍25	29‍–‍42
Washington Senators	61	75	.449	22	40‍–‍28	21‍–‍47
Detroit Tigers	52	83	.385	30½	34‍–‍33	18‍–‍50
Baltimore Orioles	50	88	.362	34	32‍–‍31	18‍–‍57

=== Record vs. opponents ===
1902 American League record Sources:
Team	BAL	BOS	CWS	CLE	DET	PHA	SLB	WSH
Baltimore	—	4–16	8–11–1	9–11	10–10	6–13	2–18–1	11–9–1
Boston	16–4	—	12–8	6–14	11–7–1	9–11	15–5	8–11
Chicago	11–8–1	8–12	—	12–7	12–7–1	10–10	9–9–1	12–7–1
Cleveland	11–9	14–6	7–12	—	8–10	8–12	9–10–1	12–8
Detroit	10–10	7–11–1	7–12–1	10–8	—	4–16	5–15	9–11
Philadelphia	13–6	11–9	10–10	12–8	16–4	—	9–10–1	12–6
St. Louis	18–2–1	5–15	9–9–1	10–9–1	15–5	10–9–1	—	11–9
Washington	9–11–1	11–8	7–12–1	8–12	11–9	6–12	9–11	—

=== Roster ===
1902 Chicago White Stockings
Roster
Pitchers: Nixey Callahan; James Durham; Ned Garvin; Clark Griffith; Jack Katoll; Dummy Leitner; Sam McMackin; Roy Patterson; Wiley Piatt	Catchers: Ed Hughes; Ed McFarland; Billy Sullivan; Infielders: Tom Daly; George Davis; Frank Isbell; Sammy Strang	Outfielders: Danny Green; Fielder Jones; Herm McFarland; Sam Mertes	Manager: Clark Griffith

== Player stats ==
=== Batting ===
==== Starters by position ====
Note: Pos = Position; G = Games played; AB = At bats; H = Hits; Avg. = Batting average; HR = Home runs; RBI = Runs batted in

Pos	Player	G	AB	H	Avg.	HR	RBI
C	Billy Sullivan	76	263	64	.243	1	26
1B	Frank Isbell	137	515	130	.252	4	59
2B	Tom Daly	137	489	110	.225	1	54
SS	George Davis	132	485	145	.299	3	93
3B	Sammy Strang	137	536	158	.295	3	46
OF	Fielder Jones	135	532	171	.321	0	54
OF	Danny Green	129	481	150	.312	0	62
OF	Sam Mertes	129	497	140	.282	1	79

==== Other batters ====
Note: G = Games played; AB = At bats; H = Hits; Avg. = Batting average; HR = Home runs; RBI = Runs batted in

Player	G	AB	H	Avg.	HR	RBI
Billy Sullivan	76	263	64	.243	1	26
Herm McFarland	7	27	5	.185	0	4
Ed Hughes	1	4	1	.250	0	0

=== Pitching ===
==== Starting pitchers ====
Note: G = Games pitched; IP = Innings pitched; W = Wins; L = Losses; ERA = Earned run average; SO = Strikeouts

Player	G	IP	W	L	ERA	SO
Nixey Callahan	35	282.1	16	14	3.60	75
Roy Patterson	34	268.0	19	14	3.06	61
Wiley Piatt	32	246.0	12	12	3.51	96
Clark Griffith	28	213.0	15	9	4.18	51
Ned Garvin	23	175.1	10	10	2.21	55
James Durham	3	20.0	1	1	5.85	3
Sam Mertes	1	4.2	1	0	1.93	0

==== Relief pitchers ====
Note: G = Games pitched; W = Wins; L = Losses; SV = Saves; ERA = Earned run average; SO = Strikeouts

Player	G	W	L	SV	ERA	SO
Frank Isbell	1	0	0	0	2.25	1
Dummy Leitner	1	0	0	0	13.50	0
Sam McMackin	1	0	0	0	0.00	2
Jack Katoll	1	0	0	0	0.00	2
