= 1902 Detroit Tigers season =

Major League Baseball season

1902 Detroit Tigers
- League: American League
- Ballpark: Bennett Park
- City: Detroit, Michigan
- Record: 52–83 (.385)
- League place: 7th
- Owners: Samuel F. Angus
- Managers: Frank Dwyer

1902 was the second year for the Detroit Tigers in the newly formed American League. The team finished in seventh place with a record of 58–77 (.385), 30½ games behind the Philadelphia Athletics. The 1902 Tigers were outscored by their opponents 657 runs to 566. The team's attendance at Bennett Park was 189,469, sixth out of the eight teams in the AL. Detroit's blue laws prevented the Tigers from playing baseball at Bennett Park on Sundays. As a result, the Tigers played their Sunday home games for the season at Burns Park; a stadium constructed by owner James D. Burns.

== Regular season ==
=== Season standings ===
American League
Team	W	L	Pct.	GB	Home	Road
Philadelphia Athletics	83	53	.610	—	56‍–‍17	27‍–‍36
St. Louis Browns	78	58	.574	5	49‍–‍21	29‍–‍37
Boston Americans	77	60	.562	6½	43‍–‍27	34‍–‍33
Chicago White Stockings	74	60	.552	8	48‍–‍20	26‍–‍40
Cleveland Bronchos	69	67	.507	14	40‍–‍25	29‍–‍42
Washington Senators	61	75	.449	22	40‍–‍28	21‍–‍47
Detroit Tigers	52	83	.385	30½	34‍–‍33	18‍–‍50
Baltimore Orioles	50	88	.362	34	32‍–‍31	18‍–‍57

=== Record vs. opponents ===
1902 American League record Sources:
Team	BAL	BOS	CWS	CLE	DET	PHA	SLB	WSH
Baltimore	—	4–16	8–11–1	9–11	10–10	6–13	2–18–1	11–9–1
Boston	16–4	—	12–8	6–14	11–7–1	9–11	15–5	8–11
Chicago	11–8–1	8–12	—	12–7	12–7–1	10–10	9–9–1	12–7–1
Cleveland	11–9	14–6	7–12	—	8–10	8–12	9–10–1	12–8
Detroit	10–10	7–11–1	7–12–1	10–8	—	4–16	5–15	9–11
Philadelphia	13–6	11–9	10–10	12–8	16–4	—	9–10–1	12–6
St. Louis	18–2–1	5–15	9–9–1	10–9–1	15–5	10–9–1	—	11–9
Washington	9–11–1	11–8	7–12–1	8–12	11–9	6–12	9–11	—

=== Roster ===
1902 Detroit Tigers
Roster
Pitchers: Jack Cronin; Wish Egan; Ed Fisher; Rube Kisinger; Arch McCarthy; Sam McMackin; Win Mercer; Roscoe Miller; George Mullin; Ed Siever; John Terry; Joe Yeager	Catchers: Fritz Buelow; Deacon McGuire; Infielders: Erve Beck; Doc Casey; Pop Dillon; Kid Elberfeld; Kid Gleason; Sport McAllister; John O'Connell	Outfielders: Harry Arndt; Jimmy Barrett; Dick Harley; Ducky Holmes; Pete LePine; Lew Post; Lou Schiappacasse	Manager: Frank Dwyer

== Player stats ==
= Indicates team leader

=== Batting ===
==== Starters by position ====
Note: Pos = Position; G = Games played; AB = At bats; H = Hits; Avg. = Batting average; HR = Home runs; RBI = Runs batted in

Pos	Player	G	AB	H	Avg.	HR	RBI
C	Deacon McGuire	73	229	52	.227	2	23
1B	Pop Dillon	66	243	50	.206	0	22
2B	Kid Gleason	118	441	109	.247	1	38
3B	Doc Casey	132	520	142	.273	3	55
SS	Kid Elberfeld	130	488	127	.260	1	64
OF	Jimmy Barrett	136	509	154	.303	4	44
OF	Dick Harley	125	491	138	.281	2	44
OF	Ducky Holmes	92	362	93	.257	2	33

==== Other batters ====
Note: G = Games played; AB = At bats; H = Hits; Avg. = Batting average; HR = Home runs; RBI = Runs batted in

Player	G	AB	H	Avg.	HR	RBI
Sport McAllister	66	229	48	.210	1	32
Fritz Buelow	66	224	48	.223	2	29
Erve Beck	41	162	48	.296	2	22
Joe Yeager	50	161	39	.242	1	23
Pete LePine	30	96	20	.208	1	19
Harry Arndt	10	34	5	.147	0	7
John O'Connell	8	22	4	.182	0	0
Lew Post	3	12	1	.083	0	2
Lou Schiappacasse	2	5	0	.000	0	1

Note: pitchers' batting statistics not included

=== Pitching ===
==== Starting pitchers ====
Note: G = Games pitched; IP = Innings pitched; W = Wins; L = Losses; ERA = Earned run average; SO = Strikeouts

Player	G	IP	W	L	ERA	SO
Win Mercer	35	281.2	15	18	3.04	40
George Mullin	35	260.0	13	16	3.67	78
Ed Siever	25	188.1	8	11	1.91	36
Roscoe Miller	20	148.2	6	12	3.69	39
Joe Yeager	19	140.0	6	12	4.82	28
Arch McCarthy	10	72.0	2	7	6.13	10
Rube Kisinger	5	43.1	2	3	3.12	7
Wish Egan	3	22.0	0	2	2.86	0
Sam McMackin	1	8.1	0	1	3.24	2
John Terry	1	5.0	0	1	3.60	0

==== Relief pitchers ====
Note: G = Games pitched; W = Wins; L = Losses; SV = Saves; ERA = Earned run average; SO = Strikeouts

Player	G	W	L	SV	ERA	SO
Jack Cronin	4	0	0	0	9.35	5
Ed Fisher	1	0	0	0	0.00	0

== Awards and honors ==
=== League top five finishers ===
- Jimmy Barrett: AL leader in putouts by an outfielder (326)
- Jimmy Barrett: #4 in AL in on-base percentage (.397)
- Jimmy Barrett: #3 in AL in bases on balls (74)
- Jimmy Barrett: #5 in AL in times on base (234)
- Fritz Buelow: AL leader in errors by a catcher (20)
- Kid Elberfeld: #2 in AL in times hit by pitch (11)
- Kid Gleason: AL leader in errors by a second baseman (42)
- Dick Harley: AL leader in times hit by pitch (12)
- Deacon McGuire: 5th oldest player in the AL (38)
- Win Mercer: #2 in AL in shutouts (4)
- Win Mercer: #3 in AL in losses (18)
- George Mullin: AL leader in wild pitches (13)
- George Mullin: #4 in AL in walks allowed (95)
- Ed Siever: AL leader in ERA (1.91)
- Ed Siever: AL leader in Adjusted ERA+ (196)
- Ed Siever: #4 in AL in walks plus hits per 9 innings pitched (WHIP) (1.051)
- Ed Siever: #4 in AL in hits allowed per 9 innings pitched (7.93)
- Ed Siever: #4 in AL in walks per 9 innings pitched (1.53)
- Ed Siever: #2 in AL in shutouts (4)
