= 1902 Baltimore Orioles season =

American baseball team season

1902 Baltimore Orioles
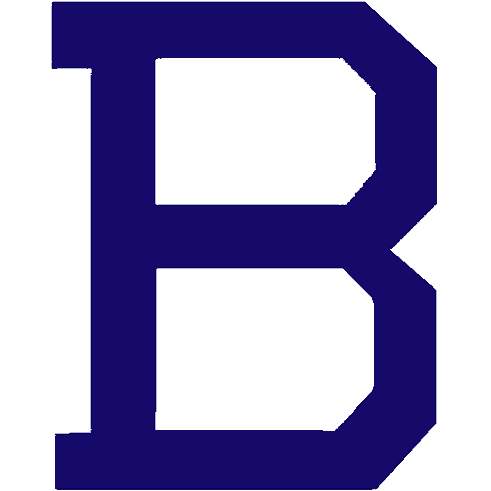
- League: American League
- Ballpark: Oriole Park
- City: Baltimore, Maryland
- Record: 50–88 (.362)
- League place: 8th
- Owners: John Mahon, Andrew Freedman, Ban Johnson
- Managers: John McGraw, Wilbert Robinson

The 1902 Baltimore Orioles season finished with the Orioles in 8th place in the American League (AL) with a record of 50–88. The team was managed by John McGraw and Wilbert Robinson. The team played at Oriole Park in Baltimore, Maryland.

During the season, Andrew Freedman, principal owner of the National League's (NL) New York Giants, with the financial backing of John T. Brush, principal owner of the NL's Cincinnati Reds, purchased the Orioles from John Mahon, who was deeply in debt. They raided the Orioles roster, releasing several of Baltimore's better players so that they could sign them to the Giants and Reds. AL president Ban Johnson seized control of the Orioles the next day and restocked their roster with players received on loan from other AL teams.

The Orioles' second season in Baltimore would ultimately prove to be their last, as after the season the team was replaced by the New York Highlanders, now known as the New York Yankees.

== Season ==
=== Offseason ===
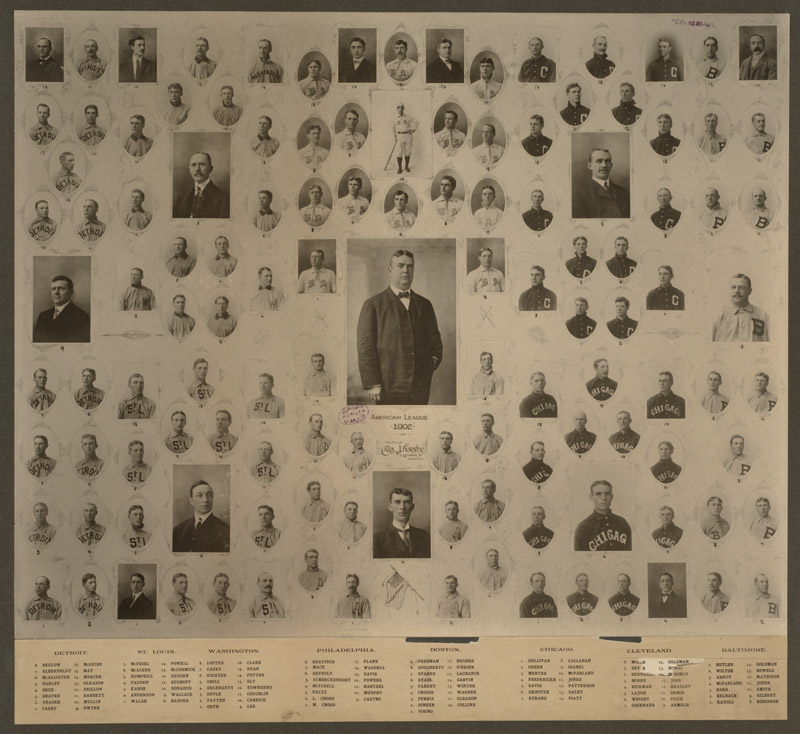
Players of the American League with league president Ban Johnson in the center, 1902

Knowing that placing a franchise in New York City was key to the success of the American League (AL), AL president Ban Johnson secretly met with principal owner John Mahon and player-manager John McGraw, who was also a part-owner, before the season about relocating to New York. However, the transfer did not occur when they could not find a suitable venue for the team.

In March, Mike Donlin went on a drinking binge in Baltimore, during which he was arrested for urinating in public and assaulting two chorus girls. The Orioles released Donlin when he was sentenced to six months in prison.

Notable players jumped to the Orioles from the rival National League (NL). In December 1901, Joe Kelley jumped from the Brooklyn Superbas. Later in the offseason, Jimmy Sheckard also jumped from Brooklyn. Kip Selbach and Jim Jackson jumped from the New York Giants, Ernie Courtney jumped from the Boston Beaneaters, Tom Hughes jumped from the Chicago Orphans, and Dan McGann jumped from the St. Louis Cardinals. The Orioles signed Bill Keister as a free agent. With these transactions, the Orioles were seen as a contender in the AL pennant going into the 1902 season.

=== Regular season ===
The Orioles drew over 10,000 fans on Opening Day. Three players returned to the NL in April 1902. Jack Dunn and Steve Brodie jumped to the Giants in April. Sheckard changed his mind about playing for the Orioles after four games, returning to Brooklyn.

Johnson openly feuded with McGraw. Many Orioles found themselves suspended by Johnson by midseason, including McGraw and Kelley. In early July, McGraw resigned from the team and signed with the New York Giants of the NL. At this point, the Orioles had a 26–31 record. Kelley and Wilbert Robinson succeeded McGraw as player-managers.

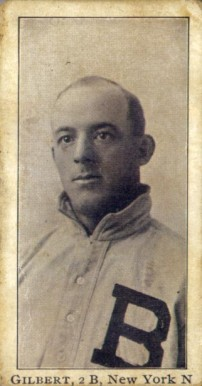
Billy Gilbert's 1902 baseball card.

The franchise began to fall into significant debt by July. Kelley, son-in-law of part-owner John Mahon, reported that the team owed as much as $12,000 ($446,538 in current dollar terms). Unable to afford that debt, Mahon purchased shares of the team from Kelley and McGraw. With this, Mahon became the majority shareholder, owning 201 of the team's 400 shares. On July 17, 1902, Mahon sold his interest in the Orioles to Andrew Freedman, principal owner of the Giants, and John T. Brush, principal owner of the Cincinnati Reds, also of the NL. The transaction was reported to have been in the range of $20,000 ($744,231 in current dollar terms). That day, Freedman and Brush released Kelley, Joe McGinnity, Roger Bresnahan, Jack Cronin, Cy Seymour, and Dan McGann from their Oriole contracts. Brush then signed Kelley and Seymour to the Reds, while Freedman signed McGinnity, Bresnahan, Cronin, and McGann, joining McGraw, his new player-manager, on the Giants.

Though Kip Selbach and Jimmy Williams were both pressed to agree to relocate as well, they refused to leave Baltimore, saying they would honor their two-year contracts. McGinnity allegedly attempted to contact Johnson that night, offering to stay with the Orioles if he could receive Johnson's personal assurance that he was welcome to stay. McGinnity did not hear back from Johnson, who had left his phone off the hook that night to avoid being contacted, and joined his teammates with the Giants. On that day, the Orioles were forced to forfeit their game against the St. Louis Browns, as Baltimore lacked the minimum number of players required to compete.

Johnson used a league rule to join the Orioles' minority owners to seize control of the team. Now running the Orioles, Johnson sought to restock the team. He requested players from the other AL franchises to fill the Orioles' roster. Sport McAllister was loaned to the Orioles from the Detroit Tigers for three games, but the Tigers requested McAllister back, as the Orioles came to Detroit to play the Tigers. The Orioles received Pop Dillon from the Tigers, but released him after using him in two games. Snake Wiltse was sent to the Orioles from the Philadelphia Athletics on July 19, but he struggled for the Orioles. The Orioles also received Lew Drill on loan from the Washington Senators, sold Charlie Shields to the St. Louis Browns and purchased Jack Thoney from the Cleveland Bronchos.

=== Season results ===
The Orioles finished the season with a 50–88 record, good for last place in the AL. For their final game at Oriole Park, the team drew only 138 fans. During the owners meetings in late 1902, the franchise was transferred to New York. MLB would not return to Baltimore until the former Browns moved to Baltimore in 1954.

=== Season standings ===
American League
Team	W	L	Pct.	GB	Home	Road
Philadelphia Athletics	83	53	.610	—	56‍–‍17	27‍–‍36
St. Louis Browns	78	58	.574	5	49‍–‍21	29‍–‍37
Boston Americans	77	60	.562	6½	43‍–‍27	34‍–‍33
Chicago White Stockings	74	60	.552	8	48‍–‍20	26‍–‍40
Cleveland Bronchos	69	67	.507	14	40‍–‍25	29‍–‍42
Washington Senators	61	75	.449	22	40‍–‍28	21‍–‍47
Detroit Tigers	52	83	.385	30½	34‍–‍33	18‍–‍50
Baltimore Orioles	50	88	.362	34	32‍–‍31	18‍–‍57

=== Record vs. opponents ===
1902 American League record Sources:
Team	BAL	BOS	CWS	CLE	DET	PHA	SLB	WSH
Baltimore	—	4–16	8–11–1	9–11	10–10	6–13	2–18–1	11–9–1
Boston	16–4	—	12–8	6–14	11–7–1	9–11	15–5	8–11
Chicago	11–8–1	8–12	—	12–7	12–7–1	10–10	9–9–1	12–7–1
Cleveland	11–9	14–6	7–12	—	8–10	8–12	9–10–1	12–8
Detroit	10–10	7–11–1	7–12–1	10–8	—	4–16	5–15	9–11
Philadelphia	13–6	11–9	10–10	12–8	16–4	—	9–10–1	12–6
St. Louis	18–2–1	5–15	9–9–1	10–9–1	15–5	10–9–1	—	11–9
Washington	9–11–1	11–8	7–12–1	8–12	11–9	6–12	9–11	—

=== Roster ===
1902 Baltimore Orioles
Roster
Pitchers: Ike Butler; Jack Cronin; Frank Foreman; Dad Hale; Crese Heismann; Harry Howell; Tom Hughes; Jack Katoll; Bob Lawson; Joe McGinnity; George Prentiss; Ernie Ross; Charlie Shields; Snake Wiltse	Catchers: Lew Drill; Wilbert Robinson; Aleck Smith; George Yeager; Infielders: Roger Bresnahan; Ernie Courtney; Pop Dillon; Billy Gilbert; Tom Jones; Jimmy Mathison; Sport McAllister; Dan McGann; John McGraw; Bill Mellor; Andy Oyler; Jack Thoney; Jimmy Williams	Outfielders: Harry Arndt; Slats Jordan; Joe Kelley; Herm McFarland; Kip Selbach; Cy Seymour; Jimmy Sheckard; Other batters: C. B. Burns	Manager: John McGraw; Wilbert Robinson

== Player stats ==
=== Batting ===
==== Starters by position ====
Note: Pos = Position; G = Games played; AB = At bats; H = Hits; Avg. = Batting average; HR = Home runs; RBI = Runs batted in

Pos	Player	G	AB	H	Avg.	HR	RBI
C	Wilbert Robinson	91	335	98	.293	1	57
1B	Dan McGann	68	250	79	.316	0	42
2B	Jimmy Williams	125	498	156	.313	2	38
3B	Roger Bresnahan	65	235	64	.272	4	34
SS	Billy Gilbert	129	445	109	.245	8	83
OF	Harry Arndt	68	248	63	.254	2	28
OF	Kip Selbach	128	503	161	.320	3	60
OF	Cy Seymour	72	280	75	.268	3	41

==== Other batters ====
Note: G = Games played; AB = At bats; H = Hits; Avg. = Batting average; HR = Home runs; RBI = Runs batted in

Player	G	AB	H	Avg.	HR	RBI
Harry Howell	96	347	93	.268	2	42
Herm McFarland	61	242	78	.322	3	36
Joe Kelley	50	222	69	.311	1	34
Tom Jones	37	159	45	.283	0	14
Aleck Smith	41	145	34	.234	0	21
Jimmy Mathison	29	91	24	.264	0	7
Andy Oyler	27	77	17	.221	1	6
John McGraw	20	63	18	.286	1	3
George Yeager	11	38	7	.184	0	1
Bill Mellor	10	36	13	.361	0	5
Jimmy Sheckard	4	15	4	.267	0	0
Sport McAllister	3	11	1	.091	0	1
Jack Thoney	3	11	0	.000	0	0
Lew Drill	2	8	2	.250	0	0
Pop Dillon	2	7	2	.286	0	0
Ernie Courtney	1	4	2	.500	0	1
Slats Jordan	1	4	0	.000	0	0
C. B. Burns	1	1	1	1.000	0	0

=== Pitching ===
==== Starting pitchers ====
Note: G = Games pitched; IP = Innings pitched; W = Wins; L = Losses; ERA = Earned run average; SO = Strikeouts

Player	G	IP	W	L	ERA	SO
Harry Howell	26	199.0	9	15	4.12	33
Joe McGinnity	25	198.2	15	10	3.44	39
Snake Wiltse	19	164.0	7	11	5.10	37
Charlie Shields	23	142.1	4	11	4.24	28
Ike Butler	16	116.1	1	10	5.34	13
Tom Hughes	13	108.1	7	5	3.90	45
Jack Katoll	15	123.0	5	10	4.02	25
Jack Cronin	10	75.2	3	5	2.62	20
Ernie Ross	2	17.0	1	1	7.41	2
Frank Foreman	2	16.1	0	2	6.06	2
Crese Heismann	3	16.0	0	3	8.44	2
George Prentiss	2	13.0	0	1	10.80	1

==== Other pitchers ====
Note: G = Games pitched; IP = Innings pitched; W = Wins; L = Losses; ERA = Earned run average; SO = Strikeouts

Player	G	IP	W	L	ERA	SO
Dad Hale	3	14.0	0	1	4.50	6
Bob Lawson	3	13.0	0	2	4.85	5
