= 1902 Washington Senators season =

1902 Washington Senators
- League: American League
- Ballpark: American League Park I
- City: Washington, D.C.
- Record: 61–75 (.449)
- League place: 6th
- Owners: Ban Johnson and Fred Postal
- Managers: Tom Loftus

The 1902 Washington Senators won 61 games, lost 75, and finished in sixth place in the American League. They were managed by Tom Loftus and played home games at the American League Park I.

== Offseason ==
- October 19, 1901: Ed Delahanty jumped to the Senators from the Philadelphia Phillies.

== Regular season ==
=== Season standings ===
American League
Team	W	L	Pct.	GB	Home	Road
Philadelphia Athletics	83	53	.610	—	56‍–‍17	27‍–‍36
St. Louis Browns	78	58	.574	5	49‍–‍21	29‍–‍37
Boston Americans	77	60	.562	6½	43‍–‍27	34‍–‍33
Chicago White Stockings	74	60	.552	8	48‍–‍20	26‍–‍40
Cleveland Bronchos	69	67	.507	14	40‍–‍25	29‍–‍42
Washington Senators	61	75	.449	22	40‍–‍28	21‍–‍47
Detroit Tigers	52	83	.385	30½	34‍–‍33	18‍–‍50
Baltimore Orioles	50	88	.362	34	32‍–‍31	18‍–‍57

=== Record vs. opponents ===
1902 American League record Sources:
Team	BAL	BOS	CWS	CLE	DET	PHA	SLB	WSH
Baltimore	—	4–16	8–11–1	9–11	10–10	6–13	2–18–1	11–9–1
Boston	16–4	—	12–8	6–14	11–7–1	9–11	15–5	8–11
Chicago	11–8–1	8–12	—	12–7	12–7–1	10–10	9–9–1	12–7–1
Cleveland	11–9	14–6	7–12	—	8–10	8–12	9–10–1	12–8
Detroit	10–10	7–11–1	7–12–1	10–8	—	4–16	5–15	9–11
Philadelphia	13–6	11–9	10–10	12–8	16–4	—	9–10–1	12–6
St. Louis	18–2–1	5–15	9–9–1	10–9–1	15–5	10–9–1	—	11–9
Washington	9–11–1	11–8	7–12–1	8–12	11–9	6–12	9–11	—

=== Roster ===
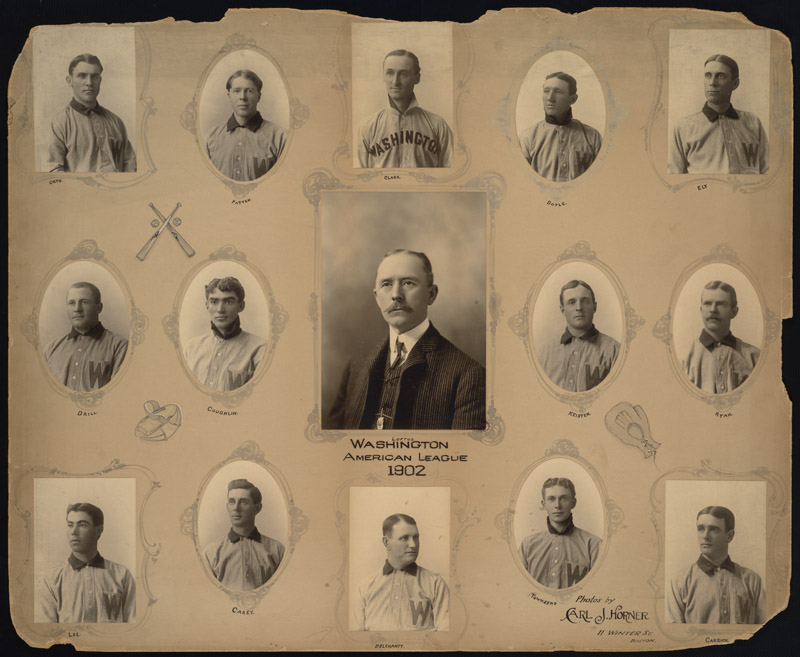
1902 Washington Senators team. Top row, left to right: Orth, Patten, Clarke, Doyle, Ely. Center row, left to right: Drill, Coughlin, Loftus, Keister, Ryan. Bottom row, left to right: Lee, Carey, Delahanty, Townsend, Carrick. Not pictured: Atz, Donahue, Stanley, Vorhees, Wolverton.

1902 Washington Senators
Roster
Pitchers: Bill Carrick; Al Orth; Casey Patten; Happy Townsend; Cy Vorhees; Catchers: Boileryard Clarke; Tim Donahue; Lew Drill	Infielders: Jake Atz; Scoops Carey; Bill Coughlin; Jack Doyle; Bones Ely; Harry Wolverton	Outfielders: Ed Delahanty; Bill Keister; Watty Lee; Jimmy Ryan; Joe Stanley	Manager: Tom Loftus

== Player stats ==
=== Batting ===
==== Starters by position ====
Note: Pos = Position; G = Games played; AB = At bats; H = Hits; Avg. = Batting average; HR = Home runs; RBI = Runs batted in

Pos	Player	G	AB	H	Avg.	HR	RBI
C	Boileryard Clarke	87	291	78	.268	6	40
1B	Scoops Carey	120	452	142	.314	0	60
2B	Jack Doyle	78	312	77	.247	1	20
3B	Bill Coughlin	123	469	141	.301	6	71
SS	Bones Ely	105	381	100	.262	1	62
OF	Jimmy Ryan	120	484	155	.320	6	44
OF	Ed Delahanty	123	473	178	.376	10	93
OF	Watty Lee	109	391	100	.256	4	45

==== Other batters ====
Note: G = Games played; AB = At bats; H = Hits; Avg. = Batting average; HR = Home runs; RBI = Runs batted in

Player	G	AB	H	Avg.	HR	RBI
Bill Keister	119	483	145	.300	9	90
Harry Wolverton	59	249	62	.249	1	23
Lew Drill	71	221	58	.262	1	29
Joe Stanley	3	12	4	.333	0	1
Jake Atz	3	10	1	.100	0	0
Tim Donahue	3	8	2	.250	0	1

=== Pitching ===
==== Starting pitchers ====
Note: G = Games played; GS = Games started; IP = Innings pitched; W = Wins; L = Losses; ERA = Earned run average; SO = Strikeouts

Player	G	GS	IP	W	L	ERA	SO
Al Orth	38	37	324.0	19	18	3.97	76
Casey Patten	36	34	299.2	17	16	4.05	92
Bill Carrick	31	30	257.2	11	17	4.86	36
Happy Townsend	27	26	220.2	9	16	4.45	71
Watty Lee	13	10	98.0	5	7	5.05	24
Cy Vorhees	1	1	8.0	0	1	4.50	1
