= Lew Post =

American baseball player (1875–1944)

- Outfielder
- Born: April 12, 1875; Woodland, Michigan
- Died: August 21, 1944 (aged 69); Chicago, Illinois
- Batted: Unknown Threw: Unknown

MLB debut
- September 21, 1902, for the Detroit Tigers

Last MLB appearance
- September 22, 1902, for the Detroit Tigers

MLB statistics
- Batting average: .083
- Home runs: 0
- Runs batted in: 2
- Stats at Baseball Reference

Teams
- Detroit Tigers (1902)

Lewis George Post (April 12, 1875 – August 21, 1944) was an American baseball player. He played three games in Major League Baseball with the 1902 Detroit Tigers, tallying one hit, two RBIs, and two runs scored in three major league games.

== Early years ==
Post was born in 1875 in Woodland, Michigan.

== Professional baseball ==
Post played for the Detroit Tigers in 1902. Post played in three games over a two-day span from September 21 to 22. He had one hit in 12 at-bats for a .083 career batting average. He played in the outfield made one error in five chances. He was the eighth person to appear in right field for the Tigers during the 1902 season. He also played for Flint in the Michigan State League, and for the Mount Clemens independent professional team.

== Later years ==
Post later worked as an elevator operator at the county hospital in Chicago. He died at his home located at 1632 Belmont Avenue, Chicago, in 1944. He was buried at All Saints Cemetery in Des Plaines, Illinois.

In early baseball encyclopedias, he is listed under the name "E. Poste", before further research in the 1980s revealed his full, proper name.
