= John O'Connell (second baseman) =

American baseball player (1872–1908)

- Second baseman
- Born: May 16, 1872; Lawrence, Massachusetts, U.S.
- Died: May 14, 1908 (aged 35); Derry, New Hampshire, U.S.
- Batted: Unknown Threw: Right

MLB debut
- August 22, 1891, for the Baltimore Orioles

Last MLB appearance
- September 20, 1902, for the Detroit Tigers

MLB statistics
- Games played: 16
- Batting average: .176
- Stats at Baseball Reference

Teams
- Baltimore Orioles (1891); Detroit Tigers (1902)

John Joseph O'Connell (May 16, 1872 – May 14, 1908) was an American baseball player for Major League Baseball. His career was short, and he only played for two seasons. During those two seasons, he accumulated relatively poor statistics in very little playing time. He played in only 16 games and had nine hits in 51 at bats for a batting average of .176. At the age of 19, he made his professional debut on August 22, 1891 for the Baltimore Orioles near the end of their 1891 season in the last year of the American Association. For the Orioles, he played second base, right field, and shortstop for a total of eight games. The following year, O'Connell was not a member of the Orioles when they transferred to the National League in 1892.

He then disappeared for about 10 years but reappeared as a member of the Detroit Tigers for their 1902 season, where he played second base and twice at first base. He joined the team late in the season and only played eight games. The Tigers struggled in their second season in the American League and were constantly changing their roster, which was largely filled with young, inexperienced, and inexpensive rookies. The Tigers finished the season with a record 52–82–2 (.385) at 30½ games out of first place— one of the team's worst seasons in history. O'Connell, like many other players from the 1902 Detroit Tigers, did not return to play the next year. He died two days short of his 36th birthday in Derry, New Hampshire on May 14, 1908.
