= 1902 St. Louis Browns season =

Major League Baseball season

1902 St. Louis Browns
- League: American League
- Ballpark: Sportsman's Park
- City: St. Louis, Missouri
- Record: 78–58 (.574)
- League place: 2nd
- Owners: Robert Hedges
- Managers: Jimmy McAleer

The 1902 St. Louis Browns season was the first for the franchise in St. Louis, after moving from Milwaukee. The team finished second in the American League with a record of 78 wins and 58 losses.

== Regular season ==
The Milwaukee Brewers of the American League decided to relocate to St. Louis for the 1902 season. Ownership chose the name "Browns" on purpose, as the St. Louis Browns had won American Association titles from 1885 to 1889. That team moved to the National League in 1892, became the Perfectos in 1899, and has been known as the Cardinals since 1900.

The new Browns quickly tried to align itself with fans by raiding the rival Cardinals. A couple of Cardinals players were signed, including slick fielding future Hall of Fame shortstop Bobby Wallace and 1901 National League batting champion outfielder Jesse Burkett. The moves paid off for the team. While playing as the 1901 Brewers, the team had a record of 48–89 (.350) and finished in eighth place, while the 1902 Browns played to a record of 78–58 (.574) and finished in second place.

=== Season standings ===
American League
Team	W	L	Pct.	GB	Home	Road
Philadelphia Athletics	83	53	.610	—	56‍–‍17	27‍–‍36
St. Louis Browns	78	58	.574	5	49‍–‍21	29‍–‍37
Boston Americans	77	60	.562	6½	43‍–‍27	34‍–‍33
Chicago White Stockings	74	60	.552	8	48‍–‍20	26‍–‍40
Cleveland Bronchos	69	67	.507	14	40‍–‍25	29‍–‍42
Washington Senators	61	75	.449	22	40‍–‍28	21‍–‍47
Detroit Tigers	52	83	.385	30½	34‍–‍33	18‍–‍50
Baltimore Orioles	50	88	.362	34	32‍–‍31	18‍–‍57

=== Record vs. opponents ===
1902 American League record Sources:
Team	BAL	BOS	CWS	CLE	DET	PHA	SLB	WSH
Baltimore	—	4–16	8–11–1	9–11	10–10	6–13	2–18–1	11–9–1
Boston	16–4	—	12–8	6–14	11–7–1	9–11	15–5	8–11
Chicago	11–8–1	8–12	—	12–7	12–7–1	10–10	9–9–1	12–7–1
Cleveland	11–9	14–6	7–12	—	8–10	8–12	9–10–1	12–8
Detroit	10–10	7–11–1	7–12–1	10–8	—	4–16	5–15	9–11
Philadelphia	13–6	11–9	10–10	12–8	16–4	—	9–10–1	12–6
St. Louis	18–2–1	5–15	9–9–1	10–9–1	15–5	10–9–1	—	11–9
Washington	9–11–1	11–8	7–12–1	8–12	11–9	6–12	9–11	—

=== Roster ===
1902 St. Louis Browns
Roster
Pitchers: Red Donahue; Jack Harper; Harry Kane; Jack Powell; Bill Reidy; Charlie Shields; Willie Sudhoff	Catchers: Jiggs Donahue; Mike Kahoe; Joe Sugden; Infielders: John Anderson; Barry McCormick; Dick Padden; Bobby Wallace	Outfielders: Jesse Burkett; Bill Friel; Emmet Heidrick; Charlie Hemphill; Davy Jones; Billy Maloney; Jimmy McAleer	Manager: Jimmy McAleer

== Player stats ==
=== Batting ===
==== Starters by position ====
Note: Pos = Position; G = Games played; AB = At bats; H = Hits; Avg. = Batting average; HR = Home runs; RBI = Runs batted in

Pos	Player	G	AB	H	Avg.	HR	RBI
C	Joe Sugden	68	200	50	.250	0	15
1B	John Anderson	126	524	149	.284	4	85
2B	Dick Padden	117	413	109	.264	1	40
SS	Bobby Wallace	133	494	141	.285	1	63
3B	Barry McCormick	139	504	124	.246	3	51
OF	Jesse Burkett	138	553	169	.306	5	52
OF	Emmet Heidrick	110	447	129	.289	3	56
OF	Charlie Hemphill	103	416	132	.317	6	58

==== Other batters ====
Note: G = Games played; AB = At bats; H = Hits; Avg. = Batting average; HR = Home runs; RBI = Runs batted in

Player	G	AB	H	Avg.	HR	RBI
Bill Friel	80	267	64	.240	2	20
Mike Kahoe	55	197	48	.244	2	28
Billy Maloney	30	112	23	.205	0	11
Jiggs Donahue	30	89	21	.236	1	7
Davy Jones	15	49	11	.224	0	3
Jimmy McAleer	2	3	2	.667	0	0

=== Pitching ===
==== Starting pitchers ====
Note: G = Games pitched; IP = Innings pitched; W = Wins; L = Losses; ERA = Earned run average; SO = Strikeouts

Player	G	IP	W	L	ERA	SO
Jack Powell	42	328.1	22	17	3.21	137
Red Donahue	35	316.1	22	11	2.76	63
Jack Harper	29	222.1	22	11	2.76	63
Willie Sudhoff	30	220.0	12	12	2.86	42
Bill Reidy	12	95.0	3	5	4.45	16
Charlie Shields	4	30.0	3	0	3.30	6
Bobby Wallace	1	2.0	0	0	0.00	1

==== Other pitchers ====
Note: G = Games pitched; IP = Innings pitched; W = Wins; L = Losses; ERA = Earned run average; SO = Strikeouts

Player	G	IP	W	L	ERA	SO
Harry Kane	4	23.0	0	1	5.48	7

==== Relief pitchers ====
Note: G = Games pitched; W = Wins; L = Losses; SV = Saves; ERA = Earned run average; SO = Strikeouts

Player	G	W	L	SV	ERA	SO
Bill Friel	4	0	0	0	4.50	0
Jesse Burkett	1	0	1	0	9.00	2
Emmet Heidrick	1	0	0	0	0.00	0
Joe Sugden	1	0	0	0	0.00	0
