= Jack Lundbom =

American baseball player (1877–1949)

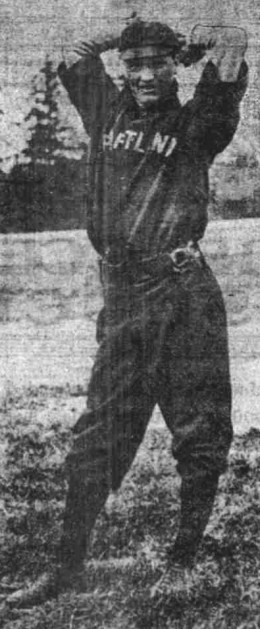
- Pitcher
- Born: March 10, 1877; Manistee, Michigan, U.S.
- Died: October 31, 1949 (aged 72); Manistee, Michigan, U.S.
- Batted: Right Threw: Right

MLB debut
- May 9, 1902, for the Cleveland Bronchos

Last MLB appearance
- September 4, 1902, for the Cleveland Bronchos

MLB statistics
- Win–loss record: 1–1
- Earned run average: 6.62
- Strikeouts: 7
- Stats at Baseball Reference

Teams
- Cleveland Bronchos (1902)

John Frederick Lundbom (March 10, 1877 – October 31, 1949) was an American Major League Baseball pitcher who played for one season. He pitched in eight games for the Cleveland Bronchos during the 1902 Cleveland Bronchos season.
