= Cy Vorhees =

American baseball player (1874–1910)

- Pitcher
- Born: September 30, 1874; Lodi, Ohio, U.S.
- Died: February 8, 1910 (aged 35); Perry, Ohio, U.S.
- Batted: Unknown Threw: Unknown

MLB debut
- April 17, 1902, for the Philadelphia Phillies

Last MLB appearance
- September 18, 1902, for the Washington Senators

MLB statistics
- Win–loss record: 3-4
- Earned run average: 3.94
- Batting average: .391
- Stats at Baseball Reference

Teams
- Philadelphia Phillies (1902); Washington Senators (1902)

Henry Bert Vorhees (September 30, 1874 – February 8, 1910) was an American professional baseball player. Nicknamed "Cy" after Cy Young, Vorhees made his major league debut in April 1902 with the Philadelphia Phillies.

He then jumped to the Washington Senators and pitched one game for them. He was one of a long line of players who jumped from the National League to the American League before the 1903 peace agreement.
