= Lou Polchow =

American baseball player (1880-1912)

- Pitcher
- Born: March 14, 1880; Mankato, Minnesota, U.S.
- Died: August 15, 1912 (aged 32); Good Thunder, Minnesota, U.S.
- Batted: Unknown Threw: Right

MLB debut
- September 14, 1902, for the Cleveland Bronchos

Last MLB appearance
- September 14, 1902, for the Cleveland Bronchos

MLB statistics
- Win–loss record: 0–1
- Earned run average: 5.63
- Strikeouts: 2
- Stats at Baseball Reference

Teams
- Cleveland Bronchos (1902)

Louis William Polchow (March 14, 1880 – August 15, 1912) was an American pitcher in Major League Baseball. He pitched in one game for the Cleveland Bronchos in 1902, throwing a complete game. He threw right-handed, stood at 5 ft 9 in (1.75 m), and weighed approximately 175 pounds.

== Career ==
Polchow was born in Mankato, Minnesota on March 14, 1880 to German immigrants Fred Christian and Wilhelmina Polchow. He started his professional baseball career in 1900, at the age of 20, in the Western League. During the next two seasons, Polchow pitched for the Evansville River Rats of the Illinois–Indiana–Iowa League. He was acquired by the Cleveland Bronchos in late 1902 and made one start for them. Polchow allowed five earned runs in eight innings and took the loss; that was his only experience in the major leagues.

Polchow played in several minor leagues after 1902. After stops in the Southern Association and South Atlantic League, he stayed in the New York State League from 1906 to 1910 as a starting pitcher. In 1908, he went 12–11 for the Utica Pent-Ups. Polchow went just 8–16 in 1910, however, and retired from organized baseball. He had a career minor league record of 58–73.

Polchow died of Bright's disease in 1912. As of 2025, he is the only person born in Mankato, Minnesota, to ever play in the major leagues.
