= Pete LePine =

Canadian baseball player (1876–1949)

- Outfielder / First baseman
- Born: September 5, 1876; Montreal, Quebec, Canada
- Died: December 3, 1949 (aged 73); Woonsocket, Rhode Island, U.S.
- Batted: Left Threw: Left

MLB debut
- July 21, 1902, for the Detroit Tigers

Last MLB appearance
- September 20, 1902, for the Detroit Tigers

MLB statistics
- Batting average: .208
- Home runs: 1
- Runs batted in: 19
- Stats at Baseball Reference

Teams
- Detroit Tigers (1902)

Louis Joseph "Pete" LePine (September 5, 1876 – December 3, 1949) was a Canadian born Major League Baseball player. A left-handed batter who also threw with his left hand, LePine had a listed height of 5'10" and a listed weight of 142 pounds.

A right fielder and first baseman, LePine spent one season in the majors, as a member of the 1902 Detroit Tigers. He appeared in 30 games, and compiled a .208 batting average and 19 RBI over 108 plate appearances.
