= Jimmy Mathison =

American baseball player (1878-1911)

- Third baseman
- Born: November 11, 1878; Baltimore, Maryland, U.S.
- Died: July 4, 1911 (aged 32); Baltimore, Maryland, U.S.
- Batted: Unknown Threw: Right

MLB debut
- August 29, 1902, for the Baltimore Orioles

Last MLB appearance
- September 29, 1902, for the Baltimore Orioles

MLB statistics
- Batting average: .264
- Home Runs: 0
- Runs batted in: 7
- Stats at Baseball Reference

Teams
- Baltimore Orioles (1902)

James Michael Ignatius Mathison (November 11, 1878 – July 4, 1911) was an American professional baseball player who played in twenty-nine games for the Baltimore Orioles during the 1902 season. He was born in Baltimore, Maryland and died there at the age of 32.
