= George Starnagle =

American baseball player (1873-1946)

- Catcher
- Born: October 6, 1873; Belleville, Illinois, U.S.
- Died: February 15, 1946 (aged 72); Belleville, Illinois, U.S.
- Batted: Right Threw: Right

MLB debut
- September 14, 1902, for the Cleveland Bronchos

Last MLB appearance
- September 14, 1902, for the Cleveland Bronchos

MLB statistics
- Batting average: .000
- Home runs: 0
- Runs batted in: 0
- Stats at Baseball Reference

Teams
- Cleveland Bronchos (1902)

George Henry Starnagle (October 6, 1873 – February 15, 1946) was an American Major League Baseball catcher who played for one season. Born George Henry Steuernagel, he played for the Cleveland Bronchos for one game on September 14 during the 1902 Cleveland Bronchos season.
