= Ginger Clark =

American baseball player (1879-1943)

- Pitcher
- Born: March 7, 1879; Wooster, Ohio, U.S.
- Died: May 10, 1943 (aged 64); Lake Charles, Louisiana, U.S.
- Batted: Right Threw: Right

MLB debut
- August 11, 1902, for the Cleveland Bronchos

Last MLB appearance
- August 11, 1902, for the Cleveland Bronchos

MLB statistics
- Win–loss record: 1–0
- Earned run average: 6.00
- Strikeouts: 1
- Stats at Baseball Reference

Teams
- Cleveland Bronchos (1902)

Harvey Daniel "Ginger" Clark (March 7, 1879 – May 10, 1943) was an American Major League Baseball pitcher for a very brief time during the 1902 season. The right-hander was born in Wooster, Ohio.

This "one-game wonder" played for the Cleveland Bronchos on August 11, 1902. He earned a win by pitching the last six innings of a 17–11 victory over the Baltimore Orioles. Though he gave up four earned runs, Clark collected two hits in four at-bats (.500), scoring two runs, and fielding three chances without an error (1.000). This all took place in front of the home crowd at League Park. After his stint with Cleveland, Clark played nine seasons in the minor leagues, seven of those with the Birmingham Barons, winning 133 games.

Clark died at the age of 64 in Lake Charles, Louisiana. He is buried in Wooster, Ohio.
