= Cal Vasbinder =

American baseball player (1880–1950)

- Pitcher
- Born: July 19, 1880; Scio, Ohio, U.S.
- Died: December 22, 1950 (aged 70); Cadiz, Ohio, U.S.
- Batted: Right Threw: Right

MLB debut
- April 27, 1902, for the Cleveland Bronchos

Last MLB appearance
- May 7, 1902, for the Cleveland Bronchos

MLB statistics
- Win–loss record: 0–0
- Earned run average: 9.00
- Strikeouts: 2
- Stats at Baseball Reference

Teams
- Cleveland Bronchos (1902)

Moses Calhoun Vasbinder (July 19, 1880 – December 22, 1950) was an American Major League Baseball pitcher who played for one season. He played for the Cleveland Bronchos for two games during the 1902 season.
