= Gary Wilson (second baseman) =

American baseball player (1879-1969)

- Second baseman
- Born: January 12, 1879; Baltimore, Maryland, U.S.
- Died: May 1, 1969 (aged 90); Randallstown, Maryland, U.S.
- Batted: Right Threw: Right

MLB debut
- September 27, 1902, for the Boston Americans

Last MLB appearance
- September 29, 1902, for the Boston Americans

MLB statistics
- Batting average: .182
- RBI: 1
- Hits: 2
- Stats at Baseball Reference

Teams
- Boston Americans (1902)

James Garrett Wilson (January 12, 1879 – May 1, 1969) was an American professional baseball player. He appeared in three games in Major League Baseball as a second baseman for the Boston Americans during the 1902 season. Listed at 5 ft 7 in (1.70 m), 168 lb., Wilson batted and threw right-handed. He was born in Baltimore, Maryland.

Wilson was 23 years old when he entered the majors in 1902 with the Americans, appearing in place of regular second baseman Hobe Ferris on the last two days of the regular season. Wilson was a .182 hitter (2-for-11) with one RBI and did not hit for extra bases or score a run.

In addition to his brief major league career, Wilson had an extensive career in minor league baseball. He played fourteen seasons in the minors, from 1897 until 1910, playing for various teams in New England and New York.

Wilson died in Randallstown, Maryland, at the age of 90.
