= Odie Porter =

American baseball player (1877–1903)

- Pitcher
- Born: May 24, 1877; Borden, Indiana
- Died: May 2, 1903 (aged 25); Borden, Indiana
- Batted: Unknown Threw: Left

MLB debut
- June 16, 1902, for the Philadelphia Athletics

Last MLB appearance
- June 16, 1902, for the Philadelphia Athletics

MLB statistics
- Win–loss record: 0–1
- Strikeouts: 2
- Earned run average: 3.38
- Stats at Baseball Reference

Teams
- Philadelphia Athletics (1902)

Odie Oscar Porter (May 24, 1877 – May 2, 1903) was an American Major League Baseball pitcher. He played for the Philadelphia Athletics during the 1902 season. He attended Indiana University.
