= Fred Mitchell (baseball) =

American baseball player and manager (1878–1970)

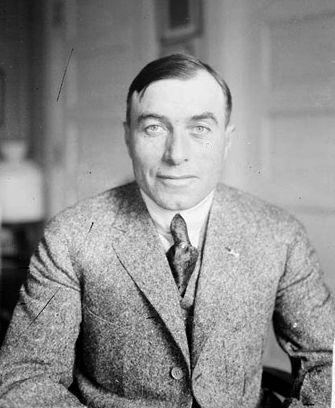
- Pitcher / Catcher / First baseman / Manager
- Born: June 5, 1878; Cambridge, Massachusetts, U.S.
- Died: October 13, 1970 (aged 92); Newton, Massachusetts, U.S.
- Batted: Right Threw: Right

MLB debut
- April 17, 1901, for the Boston Americans

Last MLB appearance
- June 15, 1913, for the Boston Braves

MLB statistics
- Win–loss record: 31–49
- Earned run average: 4.10
- Strikeouts: 216
- Games managed: 1,044
- Managerial record: 494–543
- Winning %: .476
- Stats at Baseball Reference

Teams
- As player: Boston Americans (1901–1902); Philadelphia Athletics (1902); Philadelphia Phillies (1903–1904); Brooklyn Superbas (1904–1905); New York Highlanders (1910); Boston Braves (1913); As manager: Chicago Cubs (1917–1920); Boston Braves (1921–1923)

Frederick Francis Mitchell (né Yapp; June 5, 1878 – October 13, 1970), was an American right-handed pitcher, catcher, first baseman and manager in Major League Baseball. Mitchell was born in Cambridge, Massachusetts as Frederick Francis Yapp, although he went by Mitchell (which he would legally change his name to in 1943).

== Playing career ==
He pitched for the Boston Red Sox, Philadelphia Athletics, Philadelphia Phillies, and Brooklyn Superbas from 1901 to 1905 before returning to the major leagues as a catcher for the New York Highlanders in 1910. Mitchell appeared in 97 games over the course of twelve years as a pitcher that sometimes dabbled in the infield. He batted .210 in 201 games while catching 62 games in 1910. He was one of the few players to have played for both Boston franchises along with the Yankees. He was noted for relieving Hall of Famer Cy Young in the first-ever Red Sox game. He stopped playing after the 1913 season, although he dabbled in assisting with the pitching for the team for the following year, essentially serving as an early example of a pitching coach.

== Managerial career ==
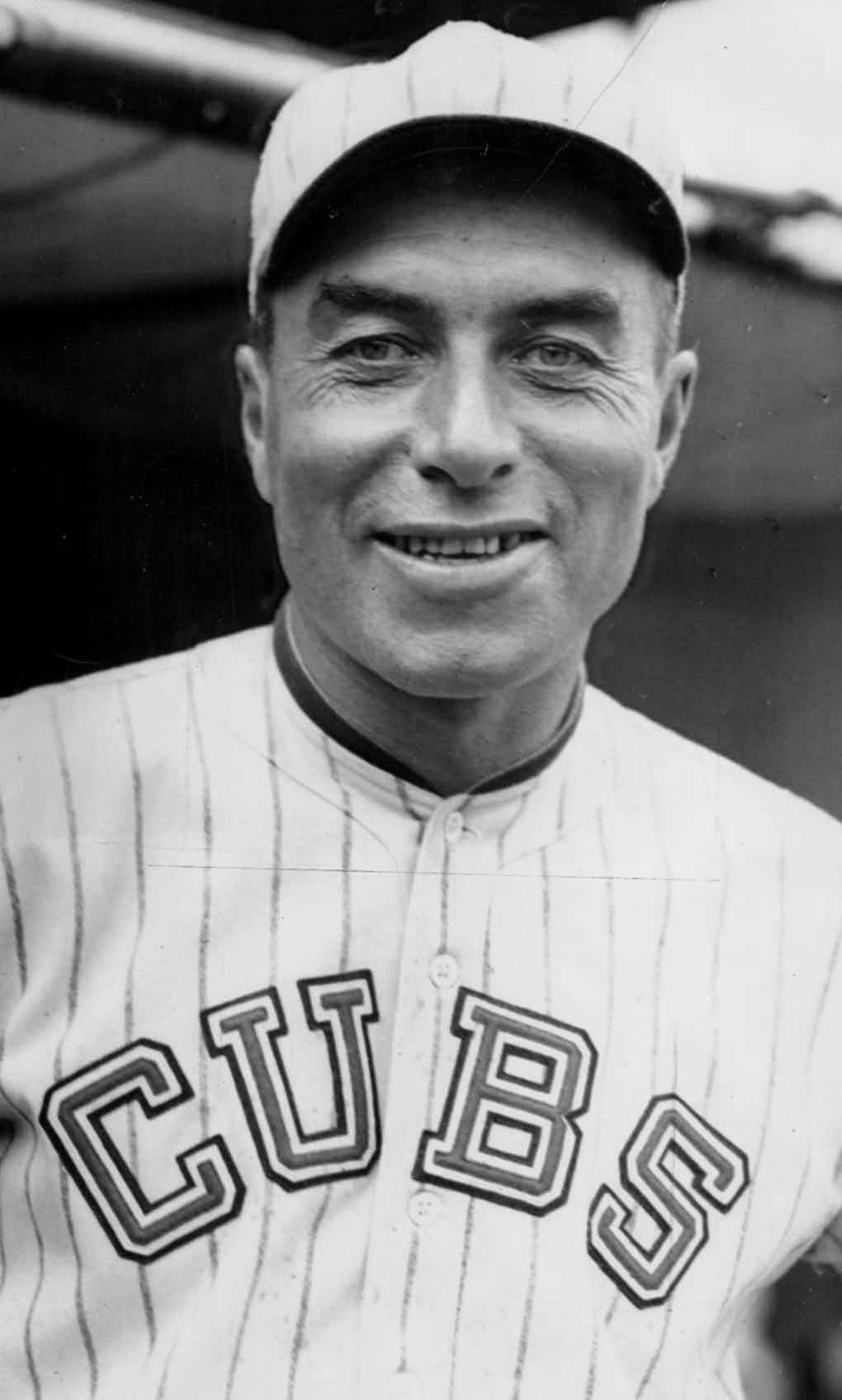
Mitchell in 1918

The Cubs desired Mitchell despite him being under contract to the Braves. They traded Joe Kelly and cash for the rights to Mitchell. On December 14, 1916, he was signed by the Cubs by owner Charles Weeghman. Mitchell was the fifth manager to have been hired after Frank Chance had departed the team after the 1912 season, with Mitchell being the only one to serve longer than one season. He took a team that won 67 games and lead them to 74 in 1917. The following season was reduced in games due to US involvement in World War I that meant for a September postseason and 131 games for a season. Mitchell was named team president prior to the season. The Cubs would go 84–45 (with two ties) while finishing first in the National League despite having their star pitcher in Grover Cleveland Alexander leave the team to serve in the war. In the World Series that year, they faced the Boston Red Sox (including Hall of Famers in Harry Hooper and Babe Ruth) in a series that was one of the lowest-scoring in history. The Cubs out-hit and out-scored the Red Sox narrowly (ten to nine), but the Cubs could not recover from losing three of the first four games, with Cubs ace Hippo Vaughn losing twice. The Series was later plagued with allegations of a Series fix circled around two Cubs pitchers (Phil Douglas and Claude Hendrix), although nothing was proven definitively.

After the season, he hired sportswriter William Veeck Sr., who became his successor as president. Mitchell's two subsequent seasons resulted in the same number of wins while other National League teams passed them by, and he was let go after finishing fifth (18 games behind) in 1920.

Mitchell was hired for the 1921 season in Boston for the Braves. He rebounded them to a 79–74 record (a seventeen-game improvement), good for a fourth-place finish. It proved to be the best mark of his tenure with the Braves, who would plummet to losing 100 games in the next two seasons before Mitchell was fired (the Braves would proceed to have an era of .500 or less seasons until 1933). He retired with a record of 494–543–7 record.

After he was fired by the Braves, he returned to Harvard University. Mitchell coached the Crimson for twelve seasons over two tenures (1916, 1926–1938), with his record being 216–134. Harvard joined the Eastern Intercollegiate Baseball League for the 1933 season, and he would lead them to their first ever regular season title with a 8–4 record in 1936 that tied for first with Dartmouth.

== Death ==
Mitchell died on October 13, 1970 in Newton Center, Massachusetts at age 92. He is buried in Brookside Cemetery in Stow, Massachusetts.
