= Dave Williams (1900s pitcher) =

American baseball player (1879-1918)

- Pitcher
- Born: July 1879; Scranton, Pennsylvania
- Died: April 25, 1918 (aged 38); Hot Springs, Arkansas
- Batted: Right Threw: Left

MLB debut
- July 2, 1902, for the Boston Americans

Last MLB appearance
- August 3, 1902, for the Boston Americans

MLB statistics
- Win–loss record: 0–0
- Earned run average: 5.30
- Strikeouts: 7
- Stats at Baseball Reference

Teams
- Boston Americans (1902)

David Owen Williams (July 1879 – April 25, 1918) was an American relief pitcher in Major League Baseball who played briefly for the Boston Americans during the 1902 season. Listed at 5 ft 11.5 in (1.82 m), 167 pounds (76 kg) Williams batted right-handed and threw left-handed. He was born in Scranton, Pennsylvania.

In his three-game MLB career, Williams posted a 5.30 earned run average in 18 2/3 innings of work, including seven strikeouts, 11 walks, three games finished, and 22 hits allowed without a decision.

In 1898, Williams played for a semi-professional team in Honesdale, Pennsylvania. There, he was teammates with future Baseball Hall of Famer Christy Mathewson. Williams taught Mathewson how to throw the "fadeaway" pitch, later known as the screwball.

Williams died in Hot Springs, Arkansas at age 38.
