= Sam McMackin =

American baseball player (1872–1903)

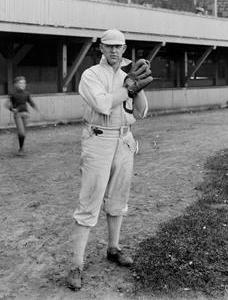
- Pitcher
- Born: November 24, 1872; Cleveland, Ohio, U.S.
- Died: February 11, 1903 (aged 30); Columbus, Ohio, U.S.
- Batted: Left Threw: Left

MLB debut
- September 4, 1902, for the Chicago White Sox

Last MLB appearance
- September 21, 1902, for the Detroit Tigers

MLB statistics
- Win–loss record: 0–1
- Earned run average: 2.38
- Strikeouts: 4
- Stats at Baseball Reference

Teams
- Chicago White Sox (1902); Detroit Tigers (1902)

Samuel McMackin (November 24, 1872 – February 11, 1903) was an American professional baseball pitcher in Major League Baseball. He appeared in two games in the majors in 1902, one for the Chicago White Sox on September 4, and the other for the Detroit Tigers on September 21. He also played in the minor leagues for six seasons.

== Career ==
McMackin was born in Cleveland, Ohio. He started his professional baseball career in 1893 with the Sandusky Sandies of the Ohio-Michigan League. In 1894, he pitched in the Western Association, and in 1895, he pitched in the Texas-Southern League.

McMackin had his big season in 1896. Playing for the Atlantic League's Paterson Silk Weavers, he went 25–16 with a 2.83 earned run average in 384.1 innings pitched. Despite being suspended for several games for pitching while drunk, he was the ace of the Paterson pitching staff, leading the team in wins and innings. One of his teammates that year was future Hall of Famer Honus Wagner. After the season, the Sporting Life wrote that: "No two men [McMackin and Jack Kellackey] worked harder for the success of the local team during the past season than did these two, and the people here appreciate it. McMackin has been made night timekeeper in one of the large iron factories here, and has already started in."

However, McMackin struggled in 1897. He pitched for three teams in the Atlantic League and went a combined 7-23. In 1898, he went 8–9; in 1899, his record was 13-13. McMackin bounced around various minor leagues for the next few seasons. In 1902, he started off the season 5-1 for the American Association's Columbus Senators. However, in early June, he was suspended for "failing to keep in proper condition." He was released from the Senators because of his drinking habits and for "attempting to disorganize the team," and he then signed with the Milwaukee Brewers later that month. In his first start for Milwaukee, McMackin was "hooted unmercifully by the 4,000 spectators, who, by their jeering, drove him to the bench."

McMackin went just 5–8 on the mound for the Brewers, but he was acquired by the American League's Chicago White Sox and made his major league debut on September 4. He pitched three innings without allowing an earned run. McMackin then joined the Detroit Tigers and appeared in his second, and final, major league game on September 21. He pitched a complete game but took a loss.

Over the winter, McMackin became ill with pneumonia and died on February 11, 1903. He was buried in Woodland Cemetery in Cleveland.
