= Tad Quinn =

American baseball player

- Pitcher
- Born: September 25, 1881; Torrington, Connecticut, US
- Died: August 6, 1946 (aged 64); Waterbury, Connecticut, US
- Batted: Unknown Threw: Right

MLB debut
- September 27, 1902, for the Philadelphia Athletics

Last MLB appearance
- May 14, 1903, for the Philadelphia Athletics

MLB statistics
- Win–loss record: 0–1
- Strikeouts: 4
- Earned run average: 4.76
- Stats at Baseball Reference

Teams
- Philadelphia Athletics (1902–1903)

Clarence Carr Quinn (September 25, 1881 – August 6, 1946) was an American Major League Baseball pitcher. He played parts of two seasons in the majors, 1902 and 1903, for the Philadelphia Athletics.

== Sources ==
- Career statistics from Baseball Reference · Baseball Reference (Minors) · Retrosheet · Baseball Almanac
