= Ed Fisher (baseball) =

American baseball player (1876–1951)

- Pitcher
- Born: October 31, 1876; Wayne, Michigan, U.S.
- Died: July 24, 1951 (aged 74); Spokane, Washington, U.S.
- Batted: Right Threw: Right

MLB debut
- September 5, 1902, for the Detroit Tigers

Last MLB appearance
- September 5, 1902, for the Detroit Tigers

MLB statistics
- Win–loss record: 0-0
- Earned run average: 0.00
- Strikeouts: 0
- Stats at Baseball Reference

Teams
- Detroit Tigers (1902)

Edward Fredrick Fisher (October 31, 1876 – July 24, 1951) was an American Major League Baseball pitcher who appeared in one game for the Detroit Tigers near the end of the 1902 season. The 6 ft 2 in (188 cm), 200 pounds (91 kg) right-hander was a native of Wayne, Michigan.

On September 5, 1902, Fisher pitched effectively in the last four innings of a 15–1 home loss against the Baltimore Orioles. He allowed five runs, but none of them were earned runs, so his lifetime ERA stands at 0.00.

One of his teammates was second baseman Kid Gleason, who would go on to become the manager of the infamous 1919 Chicago White Sox (Black Sox).

Fisher died at the age of 74 in Spokane, Washington.
