= Tom Daly (infielder) =

American baseball player (1866–1938)

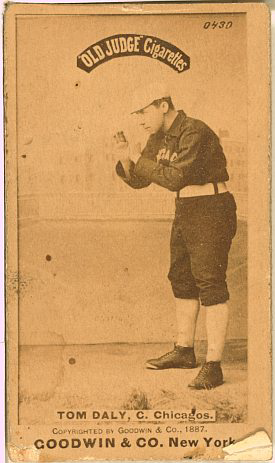
- 1887 baseball card of Daly
- Second baseman / Catcher
- Born: February 7, 1866; Philadelphia, Pennsylvania, U.S.
- Died: October 29, 1938 (aged 72); Brooklyn, New York, U.S.
- Batted: Switch Threw: Right

MLB debut
- June 9, 1884, for the Chicago White Stockings

Last MLB appearance
- September 27, 1903, for the Cincinnati Reds

MLB statistics
- Batting average: .278
- Home runs: 49
- Runs batted in: 811
- Stolen bases: 385
- Stats at Baseball Reference

Teams
- Philadelphia Keystones (1884); Chicago White Stockings (1887–1888); Washington Nationals (1889); Brooklyn Bridegrooms/Grooms/Superbas (1890–1896, 1898–1901); Chicago White Sox (1902–1903); Cincinnati Reds (1903)

Career highlights and awards
- 3× National League champion (1890, 1899, 1900)

Thomas Peter Daly (February 7, 1866 – October 29, 1938) was an American second baseman and catcher who played in Major League Baseball from 1884 to 1903. He played for the Philadelphia Keystones, Chicago White Stockings, Washington Nationals, Brooklyn Bridegrooms/Grooms/Superbas, Chicago White Sox, and Cincinnati Reds.

In 1568 games over 17 seasons, Daly posted a .278 batting average (1583-for-5701) with 1025 runs, 262 doubles, 103 triples, 49 home runs, 811 runs batted in, 687 bases on balls, 385 stolen bases, .361 on-base percentage, and .386 slugging percentage.

His brother, Joe Daly, also played professional baseball.

== See also ==
- List of Major League Baseball career triples leaders
- List of Major League Baseball career runs scored leaders
- List of Major League Baseball career stolen bases leaders
- List of Major League Baseball annual doubles leaders
