= George Prentiss =

American baseball player (1876-1902)

- Pitcher
- Born: June 10, 1876; Wilmington, Delaware, U.S.
- Died: September 8, 1902 (aged 26); Wilmington, Delaware, U.S.
- Batted: Switch Threw: Right

MLB debut
- September 23, 1901, for the Boston Americans

Last MLB appearance
- July 29, 1902, for the Baltimore Orioles

MLB statistics
- Win–loss record: 3–3
- Earned run average: 5.31
- Strikeouts: 10
- Stats at Baseball Reference

Teams
- Boston Americans (1901–1902); Baltimore Orioles (1902)

George Pepper Prentiss (a.k.a. George Pepper Wilson) (June 10, 1876 – September 23, 1902) was an American pitcher in Major League Baseball who played from 1901 through 1902 for the Boston Americans (1901–02) and Baltimore Orioles (1902). Listed at 5 ft 11 in (1.80 m), 175 lb., Prentiss was a switch-hitter and threw right-handed. He was born in Wilmington, Delaware.

In a two-season career, Prentiss posted a 3–3 record with 10 strikeouts and a 5.31 ERA in 11 appearances, including seven starts, four complete games, and 57⅓ innings of work.

Prentiss died in his hometown of Wilmington, Delaware, at age 26 from Typhoid fever.
