= Hobe Ferris =

American baseball player (1874-1938)

- Second baseman
- Born: December 7, 1874; Trowbridge, England
- Died: March 18, 1938 (aged 63); Detroit, Michigan, U.S.
- Batted: Right Threw: Right

MLB debut
- April 26, 1901, for the Boston Americans

Last MLB appearance
- October 1, 1909, for the St. Louis Browns

MLB statistics
- Batting average: .239
- Home runs: 40
- Runs batted in: 550
- Stats at Baseball Reference

Teams
- Boston Americans (1901–1907); St. Louis Browns (1908–1909)

Career highlights and awards
- World Series champion (1903)

Albert Samuel "Hobe" Ferris (December 7, 1874 – March 18, 1938) was an American professional baseball second baseman. He holds the record for the lowest on-base percentage of any player in Major League Baseball history with over 5000 plate appearances, recording an OBP of just .265. Despite this, his career slugging percentage is higher than the league average of the period.

== Biography ==
Although he grew up in Providence, Rhode Island, and was long thought to have been born there, census records indicate that he was born somewhere in England and immigrated to the United States with his parents in 1879.

He was a shortstop in the minor leagues from 1898 to 1900, after which he was drafted by the Cincinnati Reds. He chose to jump to the newly formed American League instead, and signed with the Boston Americans. As the team had already signed a shortstop in Freddy Parent, Ferris moved to second base. He made his major league debut on April 26, 1901.

He committed 61 errors as a rookie for Boston in 1901. Kid Gleason of Detroit made 64 errors, but Ferris's error total remains the second-highest total ever for a second baseman in the American League. He hit .250 with 15 triples and 63 RBI. The following season, he cut his error total to 39 and began to acquire a reputation as a stellar fielder with outstanding range. He was also one of the league's feistiest players, being suspended in 1902 for an altercation with umpire Jack Sheridan. On September 11, 1906, he got into a nasty fight with teammate Jack Hayden, whom he accused of lackadaisical play. Ferris kicked Hayden in the face. Both were ejected from the game, and Ferris was suspended for the remainder of the season. This was the first time that teammates had been ejected for fighting each other.

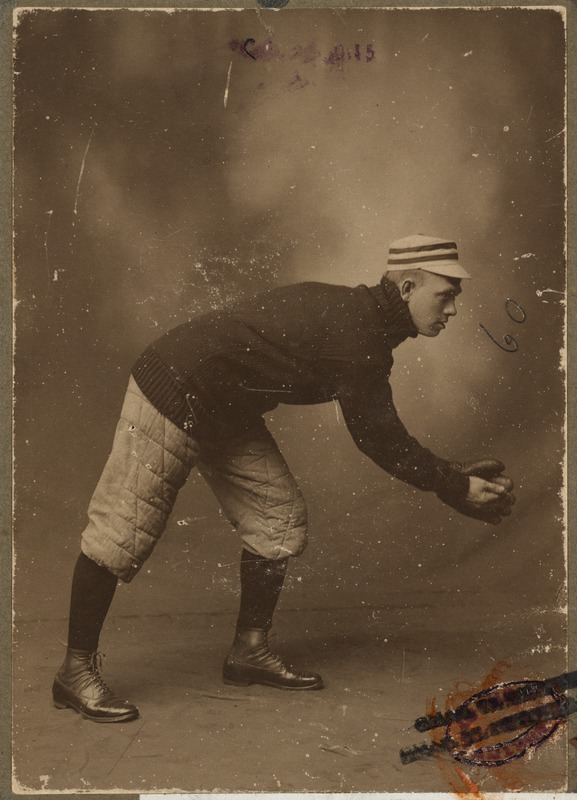
Hobe Ferris, Boston Americans second baseman, [ca. 1901]. Michael T. "Nuf Ced" McGreevy Collection, Boston Public Library

He was a member of the Boston side that won the inaugural 1903 World Series. Despite being a gifted defensive player, Ferris committed an error in the top of the first inning of the opening game of the series, fumbling a ball hit by Pittsburgh's Kitty Bransfield, and in doing so committed the first error in World Series history. He knocked in all of Boston's runs in the final game, which they won 3–0. Boston repeated as pennant winners in 1904, although no World Series was played that year. Ferris hit only .213 that season, and the team fell down the standings over the next years as its star players began to show their age. By 1906, Boston was in last place with a 49–105 record. Ferris was one of the team's few bright spots, playing excellent defense and ranking among American League leaders in extra base hits.

Prior to the 1908 season Ferris was traded to the St. Louis Browns in order to clear space for Amby McConnell, who was highly rated at the time. While at St. Louis, Ferris converted to become a third baseman. His first season with the Browns was the most productive of his entire career: he set new highs in OBP, batting average, and RBI and hit in 26 straight games. However, this relatively successful season with the bat proved to be something of a blip — in 1909 his numbers plummeted as he recorded the worst season of his career. Following this poor season Ferris's contract was not renewed by the Browns.

Following his departure from St. Louis, Ferris could not find a Major League club willing to offer him a contract. This led to him signing with the Minneapolis Millers of the American Association prior to the 1910 season. In his first season with the Millers, Ferris's performance with the bat improved slightly; however, the following year he exploded. In 1911 he hit 14 home runs and recorded an average of .303 as the Millers won their second consecutive pennant with a team that included Gavvy Cravath, Sam Leever and future Hall of Famer Rube Waddell. The Millers won a third consecutive pennant in 1912. Ferris's numbers, however, returned to their previous levels. Ferris retired after playing two more minor league seasons, with the St. Paul Saints and Wilkes-Barre Barons, respectively. His final game in the majors was October 1, 1909.

Hobe Ferris moved to Detroit after his playing career, where he worked as a mechanic. He died there of a brain hemorrhage in 1938.

== Sources ==
- Baseball: A Doubleheader Collection of Facts, Feats & Firsts. St. Louis, Mo.: The Sporting News Publishing Co. 1992. ISBN 0-88365-785-6..
