= Ned Garvin =

American baseball player (1874–1908)

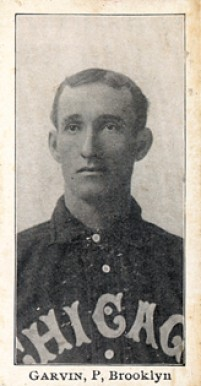
- Pitcher
- Born: January 1, 1874; Navasota, Texas, U.S.
- Died: June 16, 1908 (aged 34); Fresno, California, U.S.
- Batted: Unknown Threw: Right

MLB debut
- July 13, 1896, for the Philadelphia Phillies

Last MLB appearance
- September 16, 1904, for the New York Highlanders

MLB statistics
- Win–loss record: 57–97
- Earned run average: 2.72
- Strikeouts: 612
- Stats at Baseball Reference

Teams
- Philadelphia Phillies (1896); Chicago Orphans (1899–1900); Milwaukee Brewers (1901); Chicago White Stockings (1902); Brooklyn Superbas (1902–1904); New York Highlanders (1904)

Virgil Lee Garvin (Note: Garvin is known as Ned in most modern references, but sources frequently used his given name during his playing career.) (January 1, 1874 – June 16, 1908), nicknamed "the Navasota Tarantula", was an American pitcher in Major League Baseball (MLB). He pitched in 181 games with six teams from 1896 to 1904. Garvin was known for his bad luck as a pitcher; he had a strong career earned run average (ERA) of 2.72, but his win–loss record (57–97) suffered because he played on poorly performing teams. (Note: Some sources list a major league career record of 57–98.) He was known for throwing a pitch that made an atypical curve as it approached the batter.

Off the field, Garvin was prone to fighting and excessive drinking, and Garvin's behavior led to the end of his MLB career in 1904. Over the course of his career, he was implicated in the assaults of a team traveling secretary and an insurance salesman, the shooting of a saloonkeeper and the attempted murder of a black man at a barber shop. Garvin died of tuberculosis less than four years after his last major league appearance.

== Early life ==
Garvin was born in Navasota, Texas. He entered professional baseball in 1895 with a Texas League team in Sherman, Texas. After playing for part of the next year with a minor league team in New Haven, Connecticut, Garvin made his major league debut with the Philadelphia Phillies in 1896. He returned to the minor leagues with a team in Reading, Pennsylvania, where he played in 1897 and 1898.

Near the beginning of the 20th century, Garvin developed an unusual pitch that curved in the opposite direction of the typical curveball thrown by a right-handed pitcher. Garvin's long fingers allowed him to hold the ball with a unique grip. Sportswriter Hugh Fullerton described the pitch, writing that "the ball appeared to be moving with great speed. As it came near the batter the ball seemed to hesitate in the air and then suddenly curve down and in, just as a left hander's slow curve does. The ball was a freak. Garvin did not understand its full worth and it remained for [pitcher Christy Mathewson] to develop and use it intelligently."

Some sources credit Garvin with teaching star pitcher Mathewson about his signature pitch. Mathewson became well known for a related pitch known as the fadeaway, and a similar pitch known as a screwball exists in modern baseball. However, baseball authors Rob Neyer and Bill James credit a minor leaguer named Dave Williams with showing the fadeaway to Mathewson.

Early in his career, Garvin showed a tendency to drink heavily and to enter into violent confrontations. "It wasn’t a high-paying job and not a particularly highly looked-upon job, at the time. Not many baseball players were considered particularly good guys; they didn’t have a very good reputation in the country. But Virgil was especially bad," said baseball author Kris Rutherford. The lanky pitcher was known as "The Navasota Tarantula".

In 1900, he shot at a black man who he said had refused to shine his shoes. In the ensuing attempted murder trial, shoeshine James Harrison testified that Garvin had entered the barber shop where he was working and asked Harrison if he knew "what they did with negroes in Texas". Harrison was able to flee through a door. Garvin began to fire gunshots, and one bullet lodged in the door through which Harrison had fled. The next year Garvin knifed a man during a barroom fight.

Garvin once attempted to use his propensity for fighting in a sanctioned activity, challenging championship boxer Terry McGovern to a bout. In 1900, teammate Clark Griffith was said to be willing to bet $1,000 that McGovern could not knock Garvin out within six rounds. Griffith said that Garvin weighed 140 pounds. Though McGovern was a foot shorter than the 6'3" pitcher and weighed 122 pounds, Griffith said that it would still be a fair fight if the inexperienced Garvin could get his pre-fight weight down to 135 pounds. Griffith put up a $500 wager on the matter, but the fight never came to fruition.

== Middle career ==
After spending two seasons with the Chicago Orphans, Garvin was traded to the New York Giants in early 1901. Just days after the trade, he had an altercation with Brooklyn Superbas infielder Tom Daly. The Brooklyn infielder insulted Garvin's playing ability and told him to return to Texas. Garvin knocked Daly to the ground, then placed a beer glass on Daly's face and stomped on it. Garvin was arrested for assault with a deadly weapon and held on $300 bond. That year the fledgling American League (AL) made a serious attempt to recruit players from NL teams. Before the 1901 season started, Garvin jumped to the AL's Milwaukee Brewers.

Garvin signed with the Chicago White Stockings in January 1902. Garvin returned to Chicago with a history of bad luck on the field. With the Orphans in 1899, his 2.85 ERA led to only a 9–13 win–loss record. The next year, his ERA fell to 2.41, more than 1.2 runs better than the league average, but he earned a 10–18 record. For the 1901 Milwaukee Brewers, his ERA was higher (3.46) but still better than the league average (3.66), and Garvin registered a 7–20 record.

In August 1902, Garvin became intoxicated and shot a Chicago bar owner named Lawrence Flanigan. He also pistol whipped a policeman during the incident. The injuries were not life-threatening. He was immediately released by the White Stockings. Charles Comiskey said that Garvin had not been in good enough condition to pitch for the team in a long time and said that Garvin frequently carried a bottle of whiskey with him. Comiskey said that he was releasing Garvin for the protection of the other players on his team. Garvin was assessed a $100 fine after the incident.

Garvin signed with the Brooklyn Superbas and appeared in two games for them late in 1902, returning to the team for the 1903 and 1904 seasons. In the middle of the 1904 season, the Brooklyn team was traveling to St. Louis by Pullman car when Garvin and a few teammates were drinking heavily. The team's traveling secretary tried to calm Garvin down, but Garvin beat him severely and caused great damage to the Pullman car. During the middle of his baseball career, Garvin began to study dentistry in the offseason.

In October 1904, Garvin was in Plainfield, New Jersey, to file a lawsuit against the Plainfield Athletic Club over salary that he felt he was owed. Garvin attempted to start a conversation with another guest at the hotel, New York insurance salesman R. N. Sheffey. When the man continued to read his newspaper instead of talking to Garvin, the hot-headed pitcher beat Sheffey about the face, resulting in a broken nose. After the incident, Garvin took a trolley car to Scotch Plains, leaving his wife behind at the hotel. By the next day, Garvin agreed to return to Plainfield, to apologize to Sheffey, and to pay Sheffey $50.

On the field, Garvin found that his luck had not improved while pitching with Chicago and Brooklyn. His 2.09 ERA in 1902 earned him only an 11–11 record. He had a 15–18 record the next year, despite a better-than-average 3.08 ERA. In 1904, Garvin pitched for a 1.72 ERA, a full run better than the league average, but he finished with a 5–16 record. His last two major league appearances came with the New York Highlanders at the end of the 1904 season. Bill James wrote that Garvin was "pretty much the tough-luck pitcher of the year every year."

== Later life ==
After the 1904 season, Garvin spent the next two years pitching for the minor-league Portland Giants and Seattle Siwashes of the Pacific Coast League. In December 1906, there was speculation in the media that Garvin might not be asked to return to the team. In the same year, authorities had declared Garvin's wife Jean to be insane for the third time, as she was in the hospital and refusing to eat. Authorities were in the process of placing her either with her sister or in an institution. The couple had been longtime sweethearts and had been married since 1898.

He spent his final season pitching with the Butte Miners of the Northwestern League in 1907. In August of that year, a newspaper account said that he was pitching well. By the winter, Garvin was suffering from tuberculosis and his sports friends in Seattle raised money for him to return to Texas in the hopes that a climate change would help him. The change of location was ineffective, and Garvin moved again, this time to a drier climate in Fresno, California. He died there on June 16, 1908.
