= Ossee Schreckengost =

American baseball player (1875–1914)

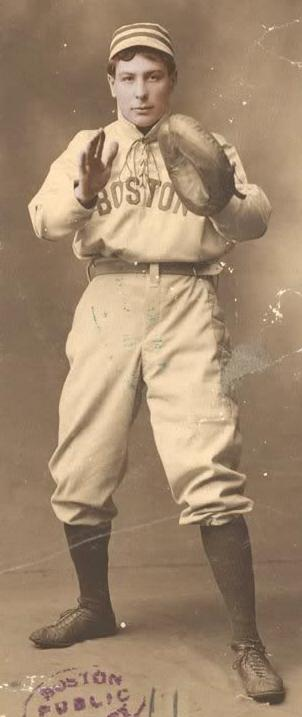
- Catcher
- Born: July 25, 1875; New Bethlehem, Pennsylvania, U.S.
- Died: July 9, 1914 (aged 39); Philadelphia, Pennsylvania, U.S.
- Batted: Right Threw: Right

MLB debut
- September 8, 1897, for the Louisville Colonels

Last MLB appearance
- October 2, 1908, for the Chicago White Sox

MLB statistics
- Batting average: .271
- Home runs: 9
- Runs batted in: 338
- Stats at Baseball Reference

Teams
- Louisville Colonels (1897); Cleveland Spiders (1898–1899); St. Louis Perfectos (1899); Boston Americans (1901); Cleveland Bronchos (1902); Philadelphia Athletics (1902–1908); Chicago White Sox (1908)

Ossee Freeman Schreckengost (Oh-SEE Shrek-EN-gost; July 25, 1875 – July 9, 1914), born F. Osee Schrecongost, baptism Osie Freeman Schreckengost, was an American professional baseball catcher and first baseman. He played for seven Major League Baseball (MLB) teams between 1897 and 1908. Between 1902 and 1908, he caught for the Philadelphia Athletics, where he was the roommate and battery mate for pitcher Rube Waddell. Schreckengost's first name is sometimes spelled "Ossie" and his last name is sometimes shortened to "Schreck" to suit the limited space in baseball box scores.

== Early life ==
Schreckengost was born in New Bethlehem, Pennsylvania, to Naaman Schrecongost and the former Sarah Caroline Protzman. He was of German descent through his father. The family lived in the nearby town of Fairmount City for a few years when Schreckengost was a child before moving the two miles back to New Bethlehem. Schreckengost worked in the mines and played local baseball in New Bethlehem before he went to Williamsport in 1895 to play semipro baseball.

== Career ==
He made his Major League Baseball debut with the Louisville Colonels on September 8, 1897. He spent the 1898 season and part of the 1899 season with the Cleveland Spiders before joining the St. Louis Perfectos, where he took over at first base for the team's player-manager, Patsy Tebeau. Schreckengost's name was frequently misspelled, due to which he was often referred to by nicknames. Early in his career, the Washington Post referred to him as "the Ghost", while teammates called him "Rocking Horse", after a mangled pronunciation of his surname.

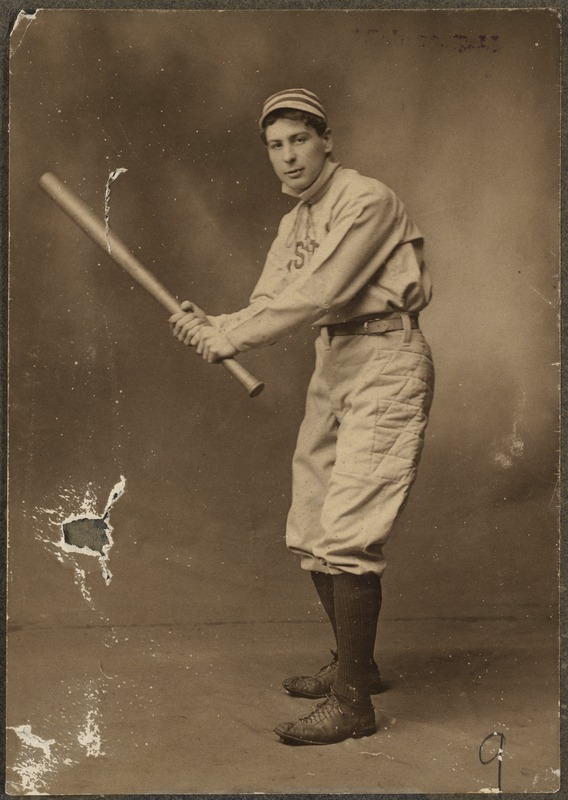
Boston Americans catcher Ossie Schreckengost in 1901. Michael T. "Nuf Ced" McGreevy Collection, Boston Public Library

Playing in the minor leagues with the Buffalo Bisons in 1900 and with the Boston Red Sox in 1901, Schreckengost went to the Philadelphia Athletics in 1902. He played in the 1905 World Series, but the Athletics lost the series 4–1 to the New York Giants. Schreckengost appeared in three games, recording two hits in nine at bats and scoring two runs. It was his only career World Series appearance.

He appeared in his final game on October 2, 1908, which was the perfect game pitched by Addie Joss. He was also on the wrong side of Cy Young's perfect game, pitched four years earlier. He may be best remembered for being Rube Waddell's primary catcher and roommate for the duration of Waddell's Philadelphia Athletic years. Waddell's unpredictable and bizarre nature famously led to Ossee insisting on a "no crackers in bed" clause added to Waddell's contract. Schreckengost played without shin guards and was one of the last major-league catchers to do so.

== Later life ==
Though Schreckengost made his last major-league appearance in 1908, he spent the next two years in the minor leagues. He died of uremia at the age of 39 in Philadelphia; he collapsed at a local café the day before his death. He was buried at Kittanning Cemetery in Kittanning, Pennsylvania. His battery mate Waddell had died a few months before him. Schreckengost was survived by his wife, the former June Reed, who was from New Castle, Pennsylvania.
