= Charlie Hickman =

American baseball player (1876–1934)

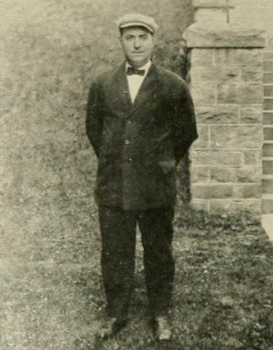
- Hickman as college baseball coach, c. 1916
- Utility player
- Born: March 4, 1876 (Note: Hickman's date of birth is listed as May 4, 1876, at baseball reference sites such as Baseball-Reference.com and Retrosheet. Other sources, including his draft registration card of September 1918, list his date of birth as March 4, 1876. Newspaper reports about his death in April 1934 noted his age as 58, which is consistent with a March birthday but not a May birthday.); Dunkard Township, Pennsylvania, U.S.
- Died: April 19, 1934 (aged 58); Morgantown, West Virginia, U.S.
- Batted: Right Threw: Right

MLB debut
- September 8, 1897, for the Boston Beaneaters

Last MLB appearance
- July 31, 1908, for the Cleveland Naps

MLB statistics
- Batting average: .295
- Home runs: 59
- Runs batted in: 614
- Win–loss record: 10–8
- Earned run average: 4.28
- Strikeouts: 37
- Stats at Baseball Reference

Teams
- Boston Beaneaters (1897–1899); New York Giants (1900–1901); Boston Americans (1902); Cleveland Bronchos / Naps (1902–1904); Detroit Tigers (1904–1905); Washington Senators (1905–1907); Chicago White Sox (1907); Cleveland Naps (1908)

Charles Taylor Hickman (March 4, 1876 – April 19, 1934) was an American professional baseball player and college baseball coach. He played all or part of 12 seasons in Major League Baseball (MLB) as a utility player for seven different franchises, including over 200 games each with the Cleveland Bronchos / Naps, Washington Senators, and New York Giants. After his professional career, he coached the West Virginia Mountaineers for four seasons.

== Playing career ==
Hickman was born in Taylortown, Pennsylvania, south of Pittsburgh, and played one season of college baseball at West Virginia University in 1897. He began his professional career in the Interstate League, a minor league, in 1896–1897.

=== Boston Beaneaters ===
Hickman's first major-league experience came with the Boston Beaneaters in 1897, when he appeared in two games as a pitcher. He made 19 additional appearances with Boston in both 1898 and 1899, mainly as a pitcher along with games as a first baseman and outfielder. In 40 total games with the Beaneaters, Hickman compiled a .339 batting average along with a 7–2 win–loss record as a pitcher.

=== New York Giants ===
Hickman next played for the New York Giants, who purchased his contract in March 1900, appearing in 127 games in 1900 and 112 games in 1901. As a pitcher he went 3–5 in nine starts during 1901, after not pitching the prior season. He batted .297 in 239 total games with the Giants. Defensively, he was the team's primary third baseman in 1900, while in 1901 he made appearances at all positions except for catcher.

=== Boston Americans ===
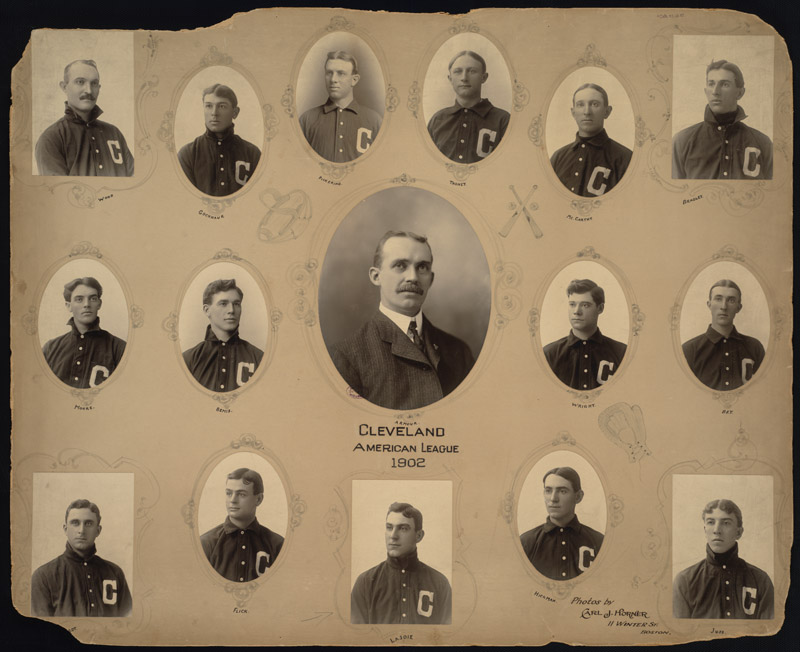
The 1902 Cleveland team—Hickman is second from right in the bottom row, between Nap Lajoie and Addie Joss

Hickman began the 1902 season with the Boston Americans, in the second season of play for the American League. In 28 games, he batted .296 while making 27 appearances as a left fielder and one as a pinch runner. On June 3, his contract was sold by Boston.

=== Cleveland Bronchos / Naps ===
Hickman spent the remainder of the 1902 season with the Cleveland Bronchos, serving as the team's primary first baseman (98 games). He batted .378 through the end of the season with Cleveland, for an overall batting average of .361 for the 1902 season. He led the American League in hits (193) and total bases (288) for the season. He returned to the team, renamed as the Cleveland Naps, for 1903 (batting .295 in 131 games) and part of 1904 (batting .288 in 86 games) until he was traded on August 7, 1904.

=== Detroit Tigers ===
Hickman joined the Detroit Tigers in exchange for first baseman Charlie Carr, playing 42 games through the end of the 1904 season. Defensively, he played exclusively at first base (39 games) along with three pinch hitting appearances. He batted .243 in those games for Detroit, giving him an overall average of .274 for the 1904 season. He returned to Detroit in 1905, playing 47 games in right field and 12 games at first base—while batting only .221—until the team sold his contract on July 6. In 101 total games with Detroit split across two seasons, he had a .230 average.

=== Washington Senators ===
Hickman played for the Washington Senators for 88 games in 1905, 120 games in 1906, and 64 games in 1907. He played primarily as a second baseman in his first season with the team, then was a right fielder in 1906, and split time between first base and right field in his final season with the team. He made his final major-league pitching appearance with the Senators, pitching five innings in a single relief appearance in 1907. He compiled an overall .292 batting average with the team until his contract was sold on August 1, 1907.

=== Chicago White Sox ===
Hickman finished the 1907 season with the Chicago White Sox, batting .261 in 21 games, primarily as a pinch hitter. After the season, the team sold his contract.

=== Cleveland Naps (second stint) ===
Hickman completed his major-league career with 66 games for Cleveland, until he was traded into the minor leagues on August 3, 1908. He batted .234 with the 1908 Naps. In two stints and 384 total career games with Cleveland, he had a .309 average.

While his final major-league appearance came in July 1908, Hickman played professionally as late as 1911 in the minor-league American Association. A newspaper article in July of that season noted that he had weight issues through his career—"His girth and dimensions have increased with each passing season."

=== Career totals ===
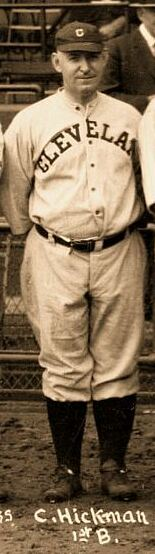
Hickman in 1921 at Cleveland's old-timers' game

Hickman played in 1,081 major-league games across 12 seasons and had a .295 average with 59 home runs and 614 runs batted in (RBIs). Despite acquiring the nickname "Piano Legs", he amassed 91 triples and had 72 stolen bases. As a pitcher, he compiled a 10–8 record in 30 games (22 starts) with a 4.28 earned run average (ERA) while striking out 37 batters in 185 innings pitched.

Hickman was not a strong defender, committing 357 errors during his major-league career while posting a .946 fielding percentage. His 87 errors during the 1900 season (86 in 120 games at third base, and one in seven games as an outfielder) are the third-worst in major-league history since 1900, exceeded only by John Gochnaur (98 in 1903) and Bill Keister (97 in 1901). Gochnaur set the record as a shortstop for the 1903 Naps, when Hickman was the team's primary first baseman. Hickman also committed five errors in a single game on September 29, 1905, as a second baseman with the Washington Senators.

Hickman served as an umpire for one major-league game, occurring on April 29, 1907. With no regular umpires present, Hickman (with the Washington Senators) umpired at home and Chief Bender (of the Philadelphia Athletics) umpired at first base.

== Coaching career ==
Hickman coached the West Virginia Mountaineers baseball team for four seasons, in 1913 and 1915–1917. His career record was 58–23–1.

=== Yearly record ===
Record table
| Season | Team | Overall | Conference | Standing | Postseason |
|---|---|---|---|---|---|
West Virginia Mountaineers (Independent) (1913)
| 1913 | West Virginia | 12–4 | | | |
West Virginia Mountaineers (Independent) (1915–1917)
| 1915 | West Virginia | 19–7–1 | | | |
| 1916 | West Virginia | 17–6 | | | |
| 1917 | West Virginia | 10–6 | | | |
| Total: | | 58–23–1 | | | |

== Later life ==
Hickman worked as a scout for the Cleveland baseball franchise for over a decade. He then became involved in politics and was elected mayor of Morgantown, West Virginia, the home of West Virginia University, three times. He also served as a magistrate and sheriff.

Hickman had married in 1913, and had three children. He was a fan of movies, highlighted by a 1915 newspaper article during the silent film era; Marguerite Clark was his favorite actress. Hickman returned to Cleveland for an old-timers' game played on July 29, 1921, along with other former Cleveland players such as Neal Ball, Nap Lajoie, Cy Young, and Chief Zimmer.

Hickman died in Morgantown in 1934, apparently from a heart attack. His widow, Pearl née Taylor, died in 1965.

In 2017, Hickman was inducted to the Sports Hall of Fame at West Virginia University, which noted that he "remains the most prominent player with WVU ties to have played in the major leagues."
