= Bert Husting =

American baseball player and attorney (1878–1948)

Berthold Juneau Husting
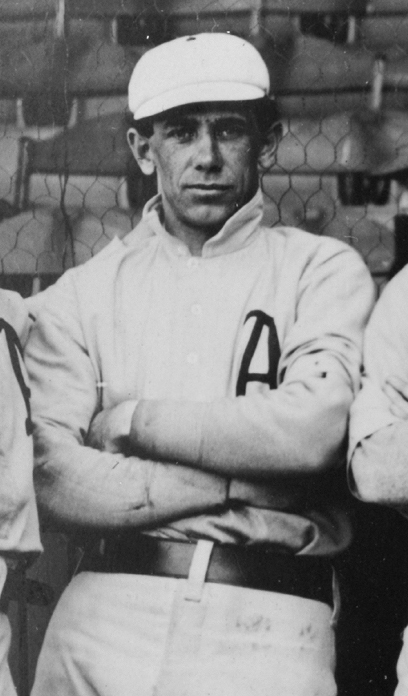

United States Attorney for the Eastern District of Wisconsin
- In office 1933–1944
- Appointed by: Franklin Delano Roosevelt
- Preceded by: Levi H. Bancroft
- Succeeded by: Timothy T. Cronin

Personal details
- Profession: Attorney, Major League Baseball player

Bert Husting
- Pitcher
- Born: March 6, 1878; Mayville, Wisconsin, U.S.
- Died: September 3, 1948 (aged 70); Milwaukee, Wisconsin, U.S.
- Batted: Right Threw: Right

MLB debut
- August 16, 1900, for the Pittsburgh Pirates

Last MLB appearance
- September 18, 1902, for the Philadelphia Athletics

MLB statistics
- Win–loss record: 23–21
- Earned run average: 4.16
- Strikeouts: 122
- Stats at Baseball Reference

Teams
- Pittsburgh Pirates (1900); Milwaukee Brewers (1901); Boston Americans (1902); Philadelphia Athletics (1902)

Berthold Juneau "Pete" Husting (March 6, 1878 – September 3, 1948) was an American baseball pitcher and attorney who served between 1933 and 1944 as United States Attorney for the Eastern District of Wisconsin. During his Major League Baseball career, Husting played with four different teams between 1900 and 1902. Listed at 5 ft 10.5 in (1.79 m), 185 lb. He batted and threw right-handed.

== Athletic career ==
Husting was born in Mayville, Wisconsin. A two-sport star, Husting was a fullback in the same University of Wisconsin–Madison football team that included legendary Pat O'Dea, and later pitched his baseball team to the 1898 Western Conference championship.

Husting entered the National League in 1900 with the Pittsburgh Pirates, playing for them one year before joining the young American League with the Milwaukee Brewers (1901), Boston Americans (1902) and Philadelphia Athletics (1902). He went 14–5 for the 1902 Athletics team who won the AL pennant, in a staff that included Rube Waddell (24–7) and Eddie Plank (20–15). Unfortunately, the Athletics did not have the chance to face the NL Champion Pittsburgh Pirates for the World Championship because there was none in 1902.

In a three-season career, Husting posted a 24–21 record with 122 strikeouts and a 4.16 ERA in 69 appearances, including 54 starts, 37 complete games, one shutout, 15 games finished, and 437 1/3 innings of work.

== Legal career ==
Following his playing retirement, he pursued a law career. In 1933, he was appointed by President Franklin D. Roosevelt as United States Attorney for the Eastern District of Wisconsin, an office he occupied until 1944 before resuming the private practice of law.

Husting died in Milwaukee, Wisconsin at age 70.

== Sources ==
- Career statistics from Baseball Reference · Retrosheet · Baseball Almanac
- Retrosheet
