= 1902 Major League Baseball season =

1902 MLB season
- League: American League (AL); National League (NL)
- Sport: Baseball
- Duration: April 19 – September 29, 1902 (AL); April 17 – October 5, 1902 (NL)
- Games: 140
- Teams: 16 (8 per league)

Pennant winners
- AL champions: Philadelphia Athletics
- AL runners-up: St. Louis Browns
- NL champions: Pittsburgh Pirates
- NL runners-up: Brooklyn Superbas

MLB seasons
- ← 1901 1903 →

Locations of teams for the 1902 American League season
American League
Locations of teams for the 1902 National League season
National League

The 1902 major league baseball season was contested from April 17 through October 5, 1902. It was the second season for the American League (AL), with the Philadelphia Athletics winning the AL pennant. In the National League (NL), in operation since 1876, the Pittsburgh Pirates won the NL pennant for the second consecutive season. There was no postseason.

Prior to the season, the Milwaukee Brewers moved and became the St. Louis Browns; the franchise would remain in St. Louis through 1953, and in 1954 moved again to become the modern Baltimore Orioles. This season would be the last of this season's Baltimore Orioles, who would fold following the conclusion of the season. The Cleveland Blues renamed as the Cleveland Bronchos.

== Schedule ==
The 1902 schedule consisted of 140 games for all teams in the American League and National League, each of which had eight teams. Each team was scheduled to play 20 games against the other seven teams of their respective league. This continued the format put in place for the 1901 season. This format would last until 1904, which saw an increase of games played.

National League Opening Day took place on April 17 with every team playing, while American League Opening Day did not take place until April 19, with a one-off game between the Baltimore Orioles and the Boston Americans, with the rest of the season beginning April 23. The American League would see its final day of the season on September 29, while the National League would see its final day of the season on October 5.

== Teams ==
| League | Team | City | Ballpark | Capacity | Manager |
|---|---|---|---|---|---|
| American League | Baltimore Orioles | Baltimore, Maryland | Oriole Park | Unknown | John McGraw |
| American League | Baltimore Orioles | Baltimore, Maryland | Oriole Park | Unknown | Wilbert Robinson |
| American League | Boston Americans | Boston, Massachusetts | Huntington Avenue Grounds | 11,500 | Jimmy Collins |
| American League | Chicago White Stockings | Chicago, Illinois | South Side Park | 14,000 | Clark Griffith |
| American League | Cleveland Bronchos | Cleveland, Ohio | League Park (Cleveland) | 9,000 | Bill Armour |
| American League | Detroit Tigers | Detroit, Michigan | Bennett Park | 8,500 | Frank Dwyer |
| American League | Philadelphia Athletics | Philadelphia, Pennsylvania | Columbia Park | 9,500 | Connie Mack |
| American League | St. Louis Browns | St. Louis, Missouri | Sportsman's Park | 8,000 | Jimmy McAleer |
| American League | Washington Senators | Washington, D.C. | American League Park | 7,000 | Tom Loftus |
| National League | Boston Beaneaters | Boston, Massachusetts | South End Grounds | 6,600 | Al Buckenberger |
| National League | Brooklyn Superbas | New York, New York | Washington Park | 12,000 | Ned Hanlon |
| National League | Chicago Orphans | Chicago, Illinois | West Side Park | 13,000 | Frank Selee |
| National League | Cincinnati Reds | Cincinnati, Ohio | Palace of the Fans | 12,000 | Bid McPhee |
| National League | Cincinnati Reds | Cincinnati, Ohio | Palace of the Fans | 12,000 | Frank Bancroft |
| National League | Cincinnati Reds | Cincinnati, Ohio | Palace of the Fans | 12,000 | Joe Kelley |
| National League | New York Giants | New York, New York | Polo Grounds | 16,000 | Horace Fogel |
| National League | New York Giants | New York, New York | Polo Grounds | 16,000 | Heinie Smith |
| National League | New York Giants | New York, New York | Polo Grounds | 16,000 | John McGraw |
| National League | Philadelphia Phillies | Philadelphia, Pennsylvania | National League Park | 18,000 | Bill Shettsline |
| National League | Pittsburgh Pirates | Allegheny, Pennsylvania | Exposition Park | 16,000 | Fred Clarke |
| National League | St. Louis Cardinals | St. Louis, Missouri | League Park (St. Louis) | 15,200 | Patsy Donovan |

=== Sunday games ===
Blue laws restricted Sunday activities in several localities, causing several teams to play at ballparks in a different locality.

| Team | City | Ballpark | Capacity | Games played |
|---|---|---|---|---|
| Cleveland Bronchos | Dayton, Ohio | Fairview Park | Unknown | 1 |
| Cleveland Bronchos | Fort Wayne, Indiana | Jail Flats | Unknown | 2 |
| Cleveland Bronchos | Canton, Ohio | Mahaffey Park | Unknown | 1 |
| Cleveland Bronchos | Columbus, Ohio | Neil Park | 6,000 | 1 |
| Detroit Tigers | Springwells Township, Michigan | Burns Park | 3,700 | 10 |

1. In today's Pittsburgh, Pennsylvania.
2. In today's Detroit, Michigan.

== Standings ==
=== American League ===
American League
| Team | W | L | Pct. | GB | Home | Road |
|---|---|---|---|---|---|---|
| Philadelphia Athletics | 83 | 53 | .610 | — | 56‍–‍17 | 27‍–‍36 |
| St. Louis Browns | 78 | 58 | .574 | 5 | 49‍–‍21 | 29‍–‍37 |
| Boston Americans | 77 | 60 | .562 | 6½ | 43‍–‍27 | 34‍–‍33 |
| Chicago White Stockings | 74 | 60 | .552 | 8 | 48‍–‍20 | 26‍–‍40 |
| Cleveland Bronchos | 69 | 67 | .507 | 14 | 40‍–‍25 | 29‍–‍42 |
| Washington Senators | 61 | 75 | .449 | 22 | 40‍–‍28 | 21‍–‍47 |
| Detroit Tigers | 52 | 83 | .385 | 30½ | 34‍–‍33 | 18‍–‍50 |
| Baltimore Orioles | 50 | 88 | .362 | 34 | 32‍–‍31 | 18‍–‍57 |

=== National League ===
National League
| Team | W | L | Pct. | GB | Home | Road |
|---|---|---|---|---|---|---|
| Pittsburgh Pirates | 103 | 36 | .741 | — | 56‍–‍15 | 47‍–‍21 |
| Brooklyn Superbas | 75 | 63 | .543 | 27½ | 45‍–‍23 | 30‍–‍40 |
| Boston Beaneaters | 73 | 64 | .533 | 29 | 42‍–‍27 | 31‍–‍37 |
| Cincinnati Reds | 70 | 70 | .500 | 33½ | 35‍–‍35 | 35‍–‍35 |
| Chicago Orphans | 68 | 69 | .496 | 34 | 31‍–‍38 | 37‍–‍31 |
| St. Louis Cardinals | 56 | 78 | .418 | 44½ | 28‍–‍38 | 28‍–‍40 |
| Philadelphia Phillies | 56 | 81 | .409 | 46 | 29‍–‍39 | 27‍–‍42 |
| New York Giants | 48 | 88 | .353 | 53½ | 24‍–‍44 | 24‍–‍44 |

=== Tie games ===
23 tie games (8 in AL, 15 in NL), which are not factored into winning percentage or games behind (and were often replayed again), occurred throughout the season.

==== American League ====
- Baltimore Orioles, 1
- Boston Americans, 1
- Chicago White Stockings, 4
- Cleveland Bronchos, 1
- Detroit Tigers, 2
- Philadelphia Athletics, 1
- St. Louis Browns, 4
- Washington Senators, 2

==== National League ====
- Boston Beaneaters, 5
- Brooklyn Superbas, 3
- Chicago Orphans, 6
- Cincinnati Reds, 1
- New York Giants, 5
- Philadelphia Phillies, 1
- Pittsburgh Pirates, 3
- St. Louis Cardinals, 6

== Managerial changes ==
=== Off-season ===
| Team | Former Manager | New Manager |
|---|---|---|
| Boston Beaneaters | Frank Selee | Al Buckenberger |
| Chicago Orphans | Tom Loftus | Frank Selee |
| Cleveland Bronchos | Jimmy McAleer | Bill Armour |
| Detroit Tigers | George Stallings | Frank Dwyer |
| New York Giants | George Davis | Horace Fogel |
| St. Louis Browns | Hugh Duffy | Jimmy McAleer |
| Washington Senators | Jim Manning | Tom Loftus |

=== In-season ===
| Team | Former Manager | New Manager |
|---|---|---|
| Baltimore Orioles | John McGraw | Wilbert Robinson |
| Cincinnati Reds | Bid McPhee | Frank Bancroft |
| Cincinnati Reds | Frank Bancroft | Joe Kelley |
| New York Giants | Horace Fogel | Heinie Smith |
| New York Giants | Heinie Smith | John McGraw |

== League leaders ==
Any team shown in small text indicates a previous team a player was on during the season.

Across both leagues, Sammy Strang tied as a leader in runs at 109 (108 with the Chicago White Stockings of the AL and 1 with the Chicago Orphans of the NL).

=== American League ===
Hitting leaders
| Stat | Player | Total |
|---|---|---|
| AVG | Nap Lajoie (CLE/PHA) | .378 |
| OPS | Ed Delahanty (WSH) | 1.043 |
| HR | Socks Seybold (PHA) | 16 |
| RBI | Buck Freeman (BOS) | 121 |
| R | Topsy Hartsel (PHA); Dave Fultz (PHA) | 109 |
| H | Charlie Hickman (CLE/BOS) | 193 |
| SB | Topsy Hartsel (PHA) | 47 |

Pitching leaders
| Stat | Player | Total |
|---|---|---|
| W | Cy Young (BOS) | 32 |
| L | Bill Dinneen (BOS) | 21 |
| ERA | Ed Siever (DET) | 1.91 |
| K | Rube Waddell (PHA) | 210 |
| IP | Cy Young (BOS) | 384.2 |
| SV | Jack Powell (SLB) | 2 |
| WHIP | Bill Bernhard (CLE/PHA) | 0.942 |

=== National League ===
Hitting leaders
| Stat | Player | Total |
|---|---|---|
| AVG | Ginger Beaumont (PIT) | .357 |
| OPS | Honus Wagner (PIT) | .857 |
| HR | Tommy Leach (PIT) | 6 |
| RBI | Honus Wagner (PIT) | 91 |
| R | Honus Wagner (PIT) | 105 |
| H | Ginger Beaumont (PIT) | 193 |
| SB | Honus Wagner (PIT) | 42 |

Pitching leaders
| Stat | Player | Total |
|---|---|---|
| W | Jack Chesbro (PIT) | 28 |
| L | Stan Yerkes (STL) | 21 |
| ERA | Jack Taylor (CHC) | 1.29 |
| K | Vic Willis (BSN) | 225 |
| IP | Vic Willis (BSN) | 410.0 |
| SV | Vic Willis (BSN) | 3 |
| WHIP | Jack Taylor (CHC) | 0.953 |

== Milestones ==
=== Batters ===
- Herman Long (BSN):
  - Recorded his 500th career stolen base against the New York Giants on April 21. He became the 10th player to reach this mark.

=== Pitchers ===
==== No-hitters ====
- Nixey Callahan (CWS):
  - Callahan threw his first career no-hitter and the first no-hitter in franchise history, by defeating the Detroit Tigers 3–0 in game one of a doubleheader on September 20. Fraser walked two and struck out two.

=== Miscellaneous ===
- Dummy Hoy (CIN) / Dummy Taylor (NYG/CLE):
  - Hoy bats against Taylor (while on New York) on May 16, becoming the first deaf matchup in major league history.
- Cleveland Bronchos:
  - Set a major league record in a game against the Baltimore Orioles on June 2, committing six errors in a single inning.

== Home field attendance ==
| Team name | Wins | %± | Home attendance | %± | Per game |
|---|---|---|---|---|---|
| Philadelphia Athletics | 83 | 12.2% | 420,078 | 103.6% | 5,754 |
| Boston Americans | 77 | −2.5% | 348,567 | 20.4% | 4,909 |
| Chicago White Stockings | 74 | −10.8% | 337,898 | −4.6% | 4,693 |
| New York Giants | 48 | −7.7% | 302,875 | 1.8% | 4,266 |
| Cleveland Bronchos | 69 | 27.8% | 275,395 | 109.6% | 4,237 |
| St. Louis Browns | 78 | 62.5% | 272,283 | 95.8% | 3,730 |
| Chicago Orphans | 68 | 28.3% | 263,700 | 28.6% | 3,663 |
| Pittsburgh Pirates | 103 | 14.4% | 243,826 | −3.2% | 3,434 |
| St. Louis Cardinals | 56 | −26.3% | 226,417 | −40.4% | 3,235 |
| Cincinnati Reds | 70 | 34.6% | 217,300 | 5.6% | 3,104 |
| Brooklyn Superbas | 75 | −5.1% | 199,868 | 0.8% | 2,897 |
| Detroit Tigers | 52 | −29.7% | 189,469 | −27.0% | 2,828 |
| Washington Senators | 61 | 0.0% | 188,158 | 16.4% | 2,767 |
| Baltimore Orioles | 50 | −26.5% | 174,606 | 23.0% | 2,728 |
| Boston Beaneaters | 73 | 5.8% | 116,960 | −20.2% | 1,624 |
| Philadelphia Phillies | 56 | −32.5% | 112,066 | −52.3% | 1,624 |

== Venues ==
The St. Louis Browns, newly relocated from their inaugural major league season in Milwaukee, Wisconsin as the Milwaukee Brewers, leave Lloyd Street Grounds and move into Sportsman's Park where they would play for 52 seasons through 1953 before again relocating to Baltimore, Maryland where they remain to this day as the Baltimore Orioles.

The Cincinnati Reds leave League Park (where they played for 18 seasons) and move to the Palace of the Fans, where they would go on to play for ten seasons through 1911.

Regarding games that were rescheduled to Sunday, and existing blue laws, the Cleveland Bronchos play five games across four parks:

- Fairview Park in Dayton, Ohio (one game, June 8).
- Jail Flats in Fort Wayne, Indiana (two games, June 22 & August 31).
- Mahaffey Park in Canton, Ohio (one game, June 15).
- Neil Park in Columbus, Ohio (one game, August 3).

== See also ==
- 1902 in baseball (Events, Births, Deaths)
