= 1901 Detroit Tigers season =

Major League Baseball season

1901 Detroit Tigers
- League: American League
- Ballpark: Bennett Park
- City: Detroit, Michigan
- Record: 74–61 (.548)
- League place: 3rd
- Owners: James D. Burns
- Managers: George Stallings

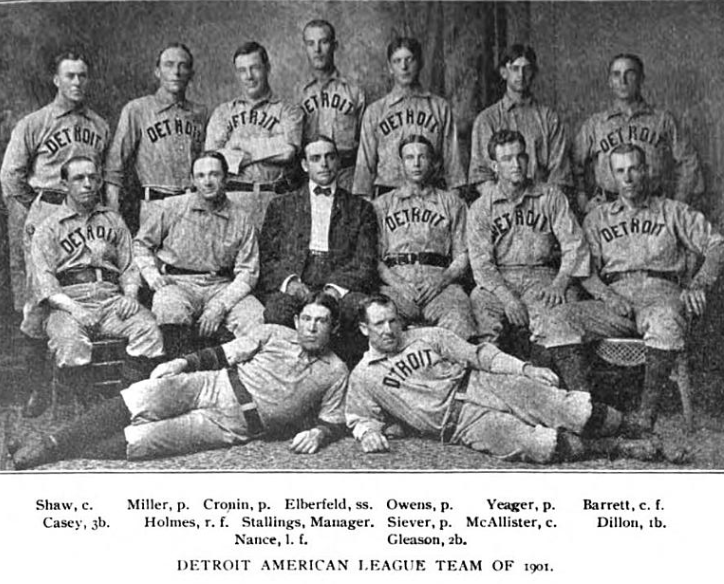
1901 Tigers team portrait

The 1901 Detroit Tigers season was the Tigers' 2nd season in Major League Baseball. The team was a charter member of the American League, which was originally formed as the minor-league Western League, of which it had also been a charter member. The Tigers finished in third place with a record or 74–61, 8 1/2 games behind the Chicago White Stockings. Most of Detroit's home games were played at Bennett Park, with Sunday games played at Burns Park due to Detroit's blue laws.

Roscoe Miller (23–13) led the team in wins and was the Tigers' first 20-game winner. His performance headlined a strong pitching staff that had the third lowest ERA (3.30) in the American League. Joe Yeager had an ERA of 2.61, for the second best Adjusted ERA+ in the AL, behind Cy Young. The offense was not as strong however, scoring 741 runs – fifth among the eight teams in the league. The team's best hitters were shortstop Kid Elberfeld (.308 average) and center fielder Jimmy Barrett (.293 average; 110 runs).

== Home field ==
The Tigers had played their games at Bennett Park since 1896, but the graduation to a major league meant that there would now be games scheduled on Sundays, which was forbidden by Detroit's blue laws. In order to avoid running afoul of this stricture, owner James D. Burns built a ballpark on his own property in Springwells Township, Michigan just outside the Detroit city limits. Named Burns Park, the Tigers would play their Sunday home games there for the 1901 and 1902 seasons.

== 1901 season ==
=== Pre-season ===
The following were key dates in the pre-season leading up to the Tigers' inaugural season:

- 12/17/1900: The "Detroit Base Ball and Amusement Company" was incorporated for the term of 10 years, articles being filed with the county clerk on this date. The stated purposes of the new company were "the owning and improving of grounds and parks for base ball, foot ball, field-day sports, picnics and other forms of recreation and amusement." The capital stock was $50,000 in 2000 shares issued to James D. Burns (900 shares), George Stallings (900 shares), Kathleen Burns (30 shares), Belle Stallings (30 shares), and attorney James McNamara (40 shares). These five also composed the board of directors.
- 1/28/01: The composition of the American League circuit was confirmed as follows: Boston, Philadelphia, Baltimore, Washington, Chicago, Cleveland, Milwaukee and Detroit. "Ten years' agreement signed and ground leases placed in Ban Johnson's hands."

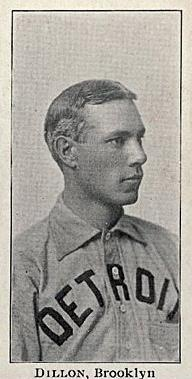
Pop Dillon with the Detroit Tigers, pictured here in 1903.

=== Regular season highlights ===
The following were key dates in the regular season of the Tigers' inaugural season:

- 4/24/01: After years in the Western League, the Tigers were scheduled to take the field for their first official American League game on April 24, 1901. A standing room only crowd was anticipated at Bennett Park, but the Tigers' inaugural American League game was postponed due to weather.
- 4/25/01: In their first major league game, the Tigers played in front of 10,023 fans in Detroit. Detroit entered the ninth inning trailing the Milwaukee Brewers 13–4, but scored 10 runs in the bottom of the ninth inning to win the game, 14–13. Third basemen Doc Casey started the ninth-inning rally with a ground rule double. The Tigers continued the rally to eventually reduce their deficit to one run. Now only down one run, 13–12, with two runners on base and two out, Tiger Frank "Pop" Dillon hit a two-run double against reliever Bert Husting to defeat the Milwaukee Brewers by a score of 14–13.
- 4/25-28/01: Detroit opened the season with a four-game series against Milwaukee. The Tigers scored 45 runs on 61 hits and 81 bases. "Each contest was won by the Tigers in their last at bat, they securing 10, 2 and 4 runs in the ninth and 5 runs in the eighth."
- 4/29/01: Detroit won its fifth consecutive game to open the season, defeating Chicago 3 to 2. All three Detroit runs were scored on home runs in the sixth inning by Pop Dillon and Kid Elberfeld.
- 5/2/01: Detroit scored five runs in the ninth inning to take a 7 to 5 lead over Chicago. The game was declared a forfeit due to Chicago's dilatory tactics. "The Chicagos, of the American League, tried to delay the game and forfeited to the Detroits. Crowd rushed for Umpire, who took refuge in players' cage."
- 5/17/01: Detroit defeated Cleveland 6 to 4. The Tigers were in first place with a record of 16–5 after 21 games.
- 5/20/01: Detroit defeated Cleveland 13 to 1. The Tigers scored eight runs in the ninth inning off Bill Hart.
- 5/23/01: The Tigers lost to Cleveland and fell out of first place for the first time. After a hot start, the Tigers lost five out of six games between May 22 and 30.
- 5/31/01: Detroit won by forfeit against Baltimore. Ducky Holmes hit a home run in the ninth inning to tie the score. The Orioles forfeit in an argument over Holmes' home run. "Baltimore forfeited to the Detroits after a squabble. Catcher Wilson, of the Montreal team of the Eastern League, assaulted Umpire Hunt."
- 6/30/01: Detroit attracted a crowd of 12,500, the largest of the season in Detroit.
- 7/3/01: Detroit defeated Milwaukee, 7 to 5, in 16 innings. Roscoe Miller pitched a complete game for the Tigers.
- 8/21/01: Detroit declared the winner by forfeit after Baltimore pitcher Joe McGinnity stepped on the feet and spat in the face of umpire Connolly. McGinnity was suspended until September 3.
- 8/27/01: Detroit lost to Boston, 2 to 1, in 15 innings.
- 9/12/01: Detroit defeated Cleveland, 5 to 4, with two runs in the ninth inning.
- 9/15/01: Detroit defeated Cleveland 21 to 0 in the most one-sided game in the American League during the 1901 season.
- 9/29/01: Season ended.

=== Attendance ===
During the 1901 season, Detroit attracted 259,430 fans at home and 238,100 on the road, for a total of 447,428. Detroit ranked third behind Chicago and Boston in overall attendance.

=== Season standings ===
American League
Team	W	L	Pct.	GB	Home	Road
Chicago White Stockings	83	53	.610	—	49‍–‍21	34‍–‍32
Boston Americans	79	57	.581	4	49‍–‍20	30‍–‍37
Detroit Tigers	74	61	.548	8½	42‍–‍27	32‍–‍34
Philadelphia Athletics	74	62	.544	9	42‍–‍24	32‍–‍38
Baltimore Orioles	68	65	.511	13½	40‍–‍25	28‍–‍40
Washington Senators	61	72	.459	20½	31‍–‍35	30‍–‍37
Cleveland Blues	54	82	.397	29	28‍–‍39	26‍–‍43
Milwaukee Brewers	48	89	.350	35½	32‍–‍37	16‍–‍52

=== Record vs. opponents ===
1901 American League record Sources:
Team	BAL	BOS	CWS	CLE	DET	MIL	PHA	WSH
Baltimore	—	9–9	4–14–1	11–9	9–10	12–7–1	12–8	11–8
Boston	9–9	—	12–8	12–6	9–11–1	15–5	10–10	12–8–1
Chicago	14–4–1	8–12	—	13–7	10–10	16–4	12–8	10–8
Cleveland	9–11	6–12	7–13	—	6–14	11–9	6–14	9–9–2
Detroit	10–9	11–9–1	10–10	14–6	—	13–7	7–9	9–11
Milwaukee	7–12–1	5–15	4–16	9–11	7–13	—	6–14	10–8–1
Philadelphia	8–12	10–10	8–12	14–6	9–7	14–6	—	11–9–1
Washington	8–11	8–12–1	8–10	9–9–2	11–9	8–10–1	9–11–1	—

=== Game log ===
1901 Game Log
April

#	Date	Opponent	Score	Record
1	April 25	Brewers	14–13	1–0
2	April 26	Brewers	6–5	2–0
3	April 27	Brewers	13–9	3–0
4	April 28	Brewers	12–11	4–0
5	April 29	@White Stockings	3–2	5–0
6	April 30	@White Stockings	2–4	5–1

May

#	Date	Opponent	Score	Record
7	May 1	@White Stockings	9–19	5–2
8	May 2	@White Stockings	7–5	6–2
9	May 3	Blues	6–3	7–2
10	May 4	Blues	4–11	7–3
11	May 5	Blues	10–3	8–3
12	May 6	Blues	5–4	9–3
13	May 7	@Brewers	9–2	10–3
14	May 9	@Brewers	6–7	10–4
15	May 10	@Brewers	7–6	11–4
16	May 11	White Stockings	9–4	12–4
17	May 12	White Stockings	7–5	13–4
18	May 13	White Stockings	8–7	14–4
19	May 14	White Stockings	2–6	14–5
20	May 16	@Blues	5–2	15–5
21	May 17	@Blues	6–4	16–5
22	May 18	@Blues	7–9	16–6
23	May 19	Blues	2–11	16–7
24	May 20	@Blues	13–1	17–7
25	May 22	Americans	5–9	17–8
26	May 23	Americans	2–4	17–9
27	May 24	Americans	3–0	18–9
28	May 25	Senators	5–6	18–10
29	May 27	Senators	4–8	18–11
30	May 30	Orioles	7–10	18–12
31	May 30	Orioles	4–1	19–12
32	May 31	Orioles	*5 – 5	20–12

June

#	Date	Opponent	Score	Record
33	June 1	Orioles	1–3	20–13
34	June 2	@Athletics	8–11	20–14
35	June 3	@Athletics	1–2	20–15
36	June 4	@Athletics	9–1	21–15
37	June 5	@Athletics	3–2	22–15
38	June 8	@Athletics	1–6	22–16
39	June 10	@Athletics	5–4	23–16
40	June 11	@Athletics	4–1	24–16
41	June 12	@Americans	2–4	24–17
42	June 13	@Americans	11–6	25–17
43	June 14	@Americans	7–16	25–18
44	June 15	@Americans	4–12	25–19
45	June 17	@Senators	9–2	26–19
46	June 18	@Senators	10–6	27–19
47	June 19	@Senators	2–7	27–20
48	June 20	@Senators	7–8	27–21
49	June 21	@Orioles	3–4	27–22
50	June 22	@Orioles	3–10	27–23
51	June 24	@Orioles	8–17	27–24
52	June 25	@Orioles	2–4	27–25
53	June 27	Brewers	4–3	28–25
54	June 28	Brewers	4–0	29–25
55	June 29	Brewers	5–0	30–25
56	June 30	@White Stockings	2–4	30–26

July

#	Date	Opponent	Score	Record
57	July 2	@White Stockings	2–3	30–27
58	July 3	@Brewers	7–5	31–27
59	July 4	@Brewers	5–1	32–27
60	July 4	@Brewers	7–8	32–28
61	July 5	White Stockings	4–8	32–29
62	July 6	White Stockings	6–5	33–29
63	July 7	White Stockings	8–3	34–29
64	July 9	@Blues	11–3	35–29
65	July 10	@Blues	7–4	36–29
66	July 11	@Blues	1–6	36–30
67	July 12	Blues	2–5	36–31
68	July 13	Blues	19–12	37–31
69	July 14	Blues	5–0	38–31
70	July 16	Senators	5–8	38–32
71	July 17	Senators	4–3	39–32
72	July 18	Senators	6–8	39–33
73	July 19	Senators	7–3	40–33
74	July 20	Americans	8–6	41–33
75	July 21	Americans	3–4	41–34
76	July 22	Americans	6–5	42–34
77	July 24	Athletics	5–12	42–35
78	July 25	Athletics	4–3	43–35
79	July 27	Orioles	1–0	44–35
80	July 28	Orioles	6–4	45–35
81	July 29	Orioles	5–10	45–36
82	July 31	@White Stockings	0–2	45–37

August

#	Date	Opponent	Score	Record
83	August 1	@White Stockings	0–4	45–38
84	August 2	@White Stockings	0–7	45–39
85	August 3	@White Stockings	8–6	46–39
86	August 4	@Brewers	3–4	46–40
87	August 4	@Brewers	4–11	46–41
88	August 5	@Brewers	4–19	46–42
89	August 6	@Brewers	8–4	47–42
90	August 7	White Stockings	9–3	48–42
91	August 8	White Stockings	8–18	48–43
92	August 9	White Stockings	12–1	49–43
93	August 10	Brewers	3–4	49–44
94	August 11	Brewers	16–5	50–44
95	August 12	Brewers	4–6	50–45
96	August 16	@Senators	5–1	51–45
97	August 17	@Senators	1–5	51–46
98	August 17	@Senators	2–0	52–46
99	August 19	@Orioles	3–4	52–47
100	August 20	@Orioles	5–2	53–47
101	August 21	@Orioles	*0 – 0	54–47
102	August 22	@Athletics	0–1	54–48
103	August 23	@Athletics	2–7	54–49
104	August 26	@Americans	6–3	55–49
105	August 27	@Americans	1–2	55–50
106	August 28	@Americans	4–2	56–50
107	August 29	Americans	5–3	57–50
108	August 30	Americans	4–5	57–51
109	August 31	Americans	6–5	58–51
110	August 31	Americans	4–4	58–51

September

#	Date	Opponent	Score	Record
111	September 1	Senators	4–9	58–52
112	September 2	Senators	5–2	59–52
113	September 2	Senators	7–4	60–52
114	September 3	Senators	2–4	60–53
115	September 4	Athletics	9–1	61–53
116	September 5	Athletics	9–11	61–54
117	September 5	Athletics	2–9	61–55
118	September 6	Athletics	8–3	62–55
119	September 7	Orioles	9–2	63–55
120	September 8	Orioles	8–5	64–55
121	September 9	Orioles	8–4	65–55
122	September 12	@Blues	5–4	66–55
123	September 12	@Blues	4–3	67–55
124	September 13	@Blues	7–0	68–55
125	September 14	Blues	3–5	68–56
126	September 15	Blues	21–0	69–56
127	September 17	@Athletics	1–4	69–57
128	September 20	@Americans	2–5	69–58
129	September 21	@Americans	3–1	70–58
130	September 22	@Americans	5–4	71–58
131	September 23	@Americans	9–2	72–58
132	September 24	@Senators	1–4	72–59
133	September 25	@Senators	2–3	72–60
134	September 26	@Senators	5–3	73–60
135	September 27	@Orioles	4–6	73–61
136	September 28	@Orioles	5–2	74–61

=== Roster ===
1901 Detroit Tigers
Roster
Pitchers: Jack Cronin; Emil Frisk; Ed High; Roscoe Miller; Frank Owen; Ed Siever; Joe Yeager	Catchers: Fritz Buelow; Sport McAllister; Al Shaw; Infielders: Doc Casey; Davey Crockett; Pop Dillon; Kid Elberfeld; Kid Gleason; Harry Lochhead	Outfielders: Jimmy Barrett; Ducky Holmes; Kid Nance	Manager: George Stallings

== Player stats ==
= Indicates team leader

=== Batting ===
==== Starters by position ====
Note: Pos = Position; G = Games played; AB = At bats; H = Hits; Avg. = Batting average; HR = Home runs; RBI = Runs batted in

Pos	Player	G	AB	H	Avg.	HR	RBI
C	Fritz Buelow	70	231	52	.225	2	29
1B	Pop Dillon	74	281	81	.288	1	42
2B	Kid Gleason	135	547	150	.274	3	75
3B	Doc Casey	128	540	153	.283	2	46
SS	Kid Elberfeld	121	432	133	.308	3	76
OF	Jimmy Barrett	135	542	159	.293	4	65
OF	Kid Nance	132	461	129	.280	3	66
OF	Ducky Holmes	131	537	158	.294	4	62

==== Other batters ====
Note: G = Games played; AB = At bats; H = Hits; Avg. = Batting average; HR = Home runs; RBI = Runs batted in

Player	G	AB	H	Avg.	HR	RBI
Sport McAllister	90	306	92	.301	3	57
Al Shaw	55	171	46	.269	1	23
Davey Crockett	28	102	29	.284	0	14
Harry Lochhead	1	4	2	.500	0	0

Note: pitchers' batting statistics not included

=== Pitching ===
==== Starting pitchers ====
Note: G = Games pitched; IP = Innings pitched; W = Wins; L = Losses; ERA = Earned run average; SO = Strikeouts

Player	G	IP	W	L	ERA	SO
Roscoe Miller	38	332.0	23	13	2.95	79
Ed Siever	38	288.2	18	15	3.24	85
Jack Cronin	30	219.2	13	15	3.89	62
Joe Yeager	26	199.2	12	11	2.61	38

==== Other pitchers ====
Note: G = Games pitched; IP = Innings pitched; W = Wins; L = Losses; ERA = Earned run average; SO = Strikeouts

Player	G	IP	W	L	ERA	SO
Emil Frisk	11	74.2	5	4	4.34	22
Frank Owen	8	56.0	1	3	4.34	17
Ed High	4	18.0	1	0	3.50	4

== Awards and honors ==
=== League top five finishers ===
- Jimmy Barrett: #5 in AL in runs scored (110)
- Jimmy Barrett: #3 in AL in bases on balls
- Jimmy Barrett: #4 in AL in times on base (240)
- Jimmy Barrett: #4 in AL in plate appearances (630)
- Doc Casey: #5 in AL in times hit by pitch (10)
- Jack Cronin: #5 in AL in bases on balls per 9 innings pitched (1.72)
- Jack Cronin: #4 in AL in strikeout to walk ratio (1.48)
- Ducky Holmes: #5 in AL in doubles (28)
- Roscoe Miller: #4 in AL in wins (23)
- Roscoe Miller: #3 in AL in innings pitched (332)
- Roscoe Miller: #5 in AL in games started (36)
- Roscoe Miller: #3 in AL in complete games (35)
- Roscoe Miller: #4 in AL in bases on balls allowed (98)
- Kid Nance: AL leader in sacrifice hits (24)
- Joe Yeager: #3 in AL in ERA (2.61)
- Joe Yeager: #2 in AL in Adjusted ERA+ (147)
