= 1900 Detroit Tigers season =

Major League Baseball season

1900 Detroit Tigers
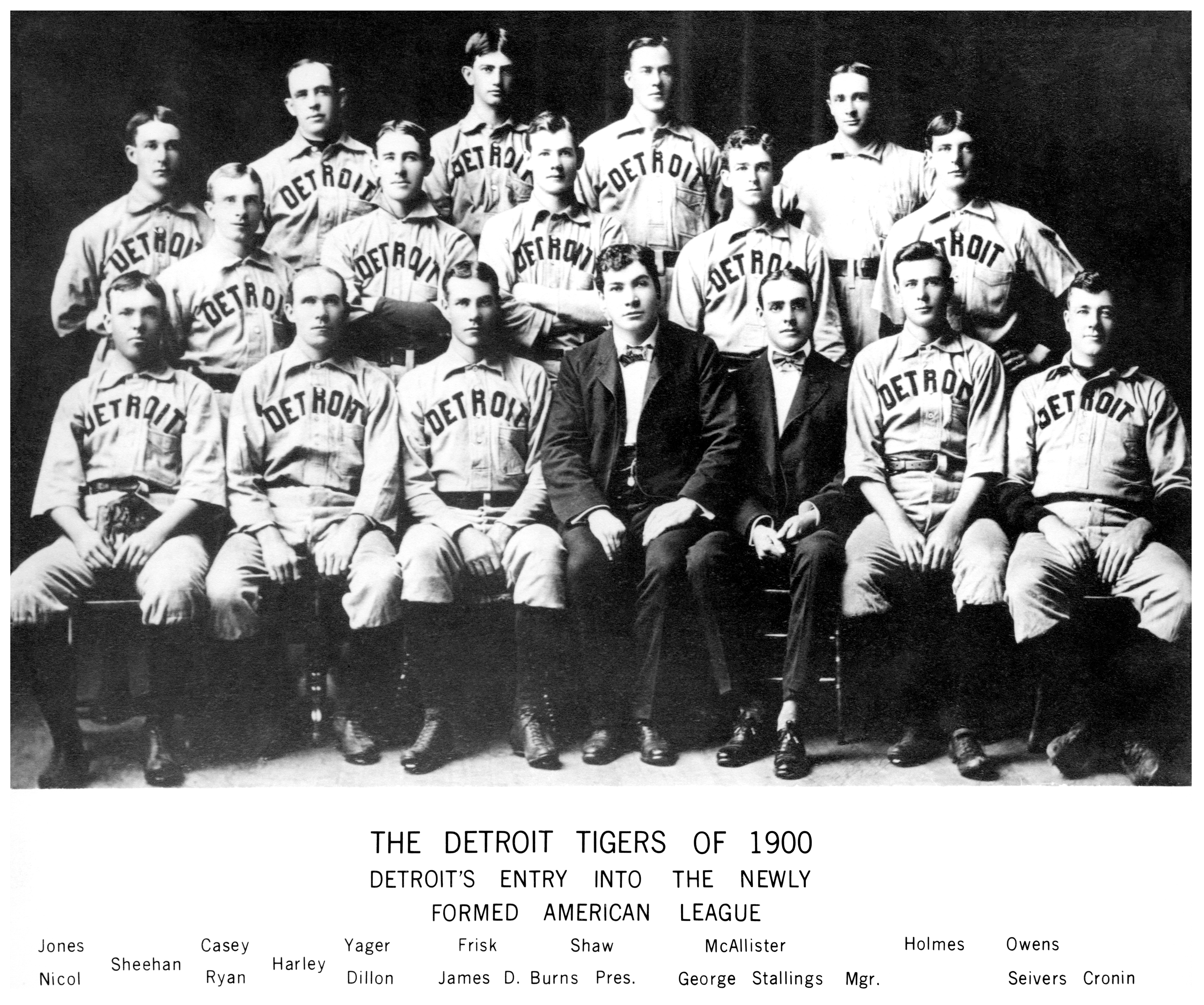
- League: American League
- Ballpark: Bennett Park
- City: Detroit, Michigan
- Record: 71–67 (.514)
- League place: 4th
- Owners: James D. Burns
- Managers: George Stallings

The 1900 Detroit Tigers season was the Tigers' first in the American League, which received recognition as a major league one year later in 1901. The Tigers finished in fourth place out of eight teams with a record of 71–67, 12 1/2 games behind Charles Comiskey's Chicago White Stockings. Detroit's home games were played at Bennett Park. George Stallings was the manager.

Outfielder Dick Harley led the team with a .325 batting average, 77 runs scored, and 47 stolen bases. Sport McAllister led in slugging percentage (.383), and Frank Dillon led in extra-base hits (30).

Roscoe Miller led the team with a 19–9 win-loss record for a .679 win percentage. Jack Cronin led in innings pitched (372) and strikeouts (121).

After the 1900 season, the Detroit Free Press wrote that not since the 1887 Detroit Wolverines won the National League championship had baseball been as "liberally supported" in Detroit, and the club's gate receipts had been "a source of envy to other magnates in the league." The paper noted that owners James D. Burns and George Stallings had spent large sums of money for "releases of star players" and had paid "major league salaries" to the majority of the players.

== Players ==
=== Batting ===
Note: Pos = Position; G = Games played; AB = At bats; H = Hits; Avg. = Batting average; R = Runs scored; SB = Stolen bases

Pos	Player	G	AB	H	Avg.	R	SB
OF	Dick Harley	123	486	158	.325	77	47
1B	Frank Dillon	123	470	137	.291	57	25
3B	Doc Casey	115	469	122	.260	75	37
C	Jack Ryan	126	462	119	.258	71	15
OF	Ducky Holmes	113	433	126	.291	64	29
SS	Kid Elberfeld	109	396	104	.263	61	28
OF/C	Sport McAllister	111	392	120	.306	65	40
3B	Suter Sullivan	88	336	96	.286	49	10
C	Al Shaw	88	294	76	.259	60	4
OF	George Nicol	73	283	73	.258	31	10
OF	George Stallings	42	147	37	.252	17	7
P	Jack Cronin	46	141	28	.199	21	2
P/2B/SS	Joe Yeager	46	141	28	.199	21	2
OF	Charlie Jones	32	121	28	.231	14	6
P	Roscoe Miller	30	98	16	.163	7	0
2B	Bill Gray	21	78	22	.282	8	2

=== Pitching ===
Note: G = Games pitched; IP = Innings pitched; W = Wins; L = Losses; PCT = Win percentage; SO = Strikeouts

Player	G	IP	W	L	PCT	SO
Jack Cronin	45	372	19	22	.463	121
Joe Yeager	32	270	19	12	.613	49
Roscoe Miller	30	241	19	9	.679	54
Emil Frisk	20	150	6	9	.400	46
Ed Siever	14	111	6	5	.545	26
Welcome Gaston	8	46	1	4	na	6
Bill Hill	5	22	1	3	na	7
Jack Fifield	5	20	0	2	na	2
Frank Owen	3	12	0	1	na	6
Sport McAllister	1	1	0	0	na	0
