= Guardians–Tigers rivalry =

Major League Baseball rivalry

- Cleveland Guardians Detroit Tigers
- Location: Midwestern United States
- First meeting: May 3, 1901; Bennett Park, Detroit, Michigan; Tigers 6, Blues 3
- Latest meeting: September 6, 2026; Progressive Field, Cleveland, Ohio; Guardians 3, Tigers 2
- Next meeting: March 29, 2027; Comerica Park, Detroit, Michigan
- Stadiums: Guardians: Progressive Field; Tigers: Comerica Park

Statistics
- Total meetings: 2,360
- All-time series: Guardians, 1,177–1,171–12 (.501)
- Regular season series: Guardians, 1,173–1,167–12 (.501)
- Postseason results: Tie, 4–4 (.500)
- Largest victory: Guardians: 15–0 (September 15, (2018); Tigers: 21–0 (September 21, (1901)
- Longest win streak: Guardians, 20 (April 11, 2019–August 16, 2020); Tigers, 10 (September 1, 2009–May 8, 2010, August 11, 2011–September 28, 2011)
- Current win streak: Guardians, 1

Post-season history
- 2024 AL Division Series: Guardians won, 3–2; 2025 AL Wild Card Series: Tigers won, 2–1

Locations of the Cleveland Guardians and Detroit Tigers

The Guardians–Tigers rivalry (known as the Indians–Tigers rivalry prior to 2022) is a Major League Baseball rivalry between the Cleveland Guardians and the Detroit Tigers of the American League Central division. This series has been one of the oldest in league history. Both teams were founded in 1901 as charter members of the American League (AL). Through the 2026 season, Cleveland holds a narrow 1,177–1,171–12 lead. The two teams have met twice in the postseason, with each team winning once; the Guardians won the 2024 AL Division Series and the Tigers won the 2025 AL Wild Card Series.

== History ==
=== Early history (1901–1993) ===
The then-Cleveland Blues and the Detroit Tigers joined the AL as charter members in 1901. They first met on May 3 of that year, with Detroit posting a 6–3 win.

Despite geographical proximity, the two teams were rarely competitive simultaneously. Only twice from 1901 through 2006 did they finish in the top two spots in their league or division: In 1908 the Tigers won the AL pennant by a half-game over the then-Naps, and in 1940, the Tigers won the AL pennant by a game over the then-Indians.

Two star hitter, Ty Cobb of the Tigers and Nap Lajoie of the then-Cleveland Naps, competed for the 1910 batting title, called the 1910 Chalmers Award, with both players ultimately winning the top prize, a new automobile. On June 30, 1948, Cleveland's Bob Lemon threw a no-hitter against Detroit. Cleveland's Bob Feller threw a no-hitter against Detroit on July 1, 1951.

The Indians and Tigers were placed in the AL East division from 1969 to 1993. However, the teams again were not simultaneously competitive. The Tigers won division titles in 1972, 1984 and 1987, but the Indians did not win any division title during this time. The teams never simultaneously finished in the top three in AL East.

=== 1990s and 2000s: Forming the AL Central ===
The 1994 MLB realignment resulted in the formation of the AL Central. Cleveland was placed in the new division, while Detroit remained in the AL East, resulting in the teams being in different divisions for the first time. This placement was short-lived, as Detroit moved to the AL Central in 1998 as the Tampa Bay Devil Rays took Detroit's place in the East. During this time, Cleveland appeared in the 1995 and 1997 World Series, while Detroit finished near the bottom of the AL East. During the 1996 season, Cleveland went 12–0 against Detroit, the first time the Indians had ever gone undefeated against another team for an entire season and the first time the Tigers had ever gone winless against a team for an entire season. Because Jacobs Field was sold out for the entire season and the Tigers were struggling with attendance, thousands of Cleveland fans traveled to Detroit for the two series played there, with the Tigers even marketing directly to Indians fans for the August series.

After the Tigers joined the AL Central, they continued to struggle, while Cleveland remained near the top of the division through the late 1990s and early 2000s. However, Detroit earned a Wild Card spot in 2006, and made it to that year's World Series.

The teams had their first battle for the AL Central title in 2007. Heading into a three-game series in Cleveland from September 17–19, the Indians held a 4 1/2 game lead. Cleveland swept that series to extend their lead to 7 1/2 games, eventually winning the division by 8 games.

=== 2010s ===
On June 2, 2010, Tigers pitcher Armando Galarraga nearly pitched a perfect game against the Indians. Galarraga retired the first 26 batters he faced, but his bid was ruined one out short when first-base umpire Jim Joyce incorrectly ruled that Indians batter Jason Donald reached first base safely on a ground ball. Galarraga instead finished with a one-hit shutout in a 3–0 victory. This would have been the first perfect game in the history of the rivalry.

The Tigers dominated the AL Central in the early 2010s, winning four straight division titles from 2011 to 2014, including an appearance in the 2012 World Series. In 2013, the Tigers won 15 of the 19 meetings with the Indians and led the division by 8 1/2 games going into September. However, Cleveland went 21–6 in September, including a 10-game winning streak to end the season. Detroit clinched the division in the final week but ended up only winning it by a single game. Cleveland clinched a wild card spot, making 2013 the first season when both teams qualified for the playoffs.

During a game in Cleveland on August 7, 2013, many Tigers fans who made the short trip to Cleveland started a "Let's go Tigers!" chant while the game was tied in the ninth inning. Cleveland fans countered with a "Detroit's bankrupt!" chant, in reference to the city's 2013 bankruptcy. Footage of the chants from SportsTime Ohio circulated online, with many baseball fans on social media criticizing Cleveland fans for the chant due to the circumstances of Detroit's financial situation. The Tigers won the game 6–5 in 14 innings.

In the second half of the decade, Detroit fell to the bottom of the division and Cleveland rose to the top, winning three straight division titles from 2016 to 2018 and appearing in the 2016 World Series. In 2019, Cleveland posted an 18–1 record against Detroit, marking the most one-sided season series in the history of the rivalry. Cleveland won the final 17 meetings in 2019 and the first two in 2020, to post a 19-game winning streak against Detroit.

=== 2020s: First playoff meetings ===
The mid-2020s finally saw the now-Guardians and Tigers become simultaneously competitive. In 2024, the Guardians led the AL Central for much of the season. The Tigers struggled for the first four months of the season, posting a record of 55–63 on August 10. However, the Tigers then went 31–11 in their next 42 games to clinch a wild card spot.

The Guardians, as AL Central champions and the league's #2 seed, had a first round bye, while the #6-seeded Tigers swept the Houston Astros in the AL Wild Card Series, resulting in the two teams' first postseason meeting in the AL Division Series. In Game 1 in Cleveland, The Guardians raced to a 5–0 first-inning lead, on their way to a 7–0 win. Game 2 was scoreless going into the ninth inning, when Detroit's Kerry Carpenter hit a three-run homer off Cleveland closer Emmanuel Clase, who had a 0.61 ERA in the regular season. This proved decisive in the Tigers' 3–0 win to even the series heading back to Detroit. After the Tigers posted another shutout win in Game 3, the Guardians came back for a narrow 5–4 win in Game 4, with David Fry hitting a go-ahead two-run home run in the seventh and plating another run on a squeeze play in the ninth. In Game 5, tied 1–1 in the fifth inning, Cleveland's Lane Thomas hit a grand slam home run off Detroit ace and eventual Cy Young Award winner Tarik Skubal to give Cleveland a 5–1 lead. The Guardians won the game 7–3 to advance to the ALCS. Cleveland ultimately lost the ALCS to the New York Yankees, 4 games to 1.

The 2025 season saw the Tigers race to a 59–34 start by July 8, whereas Cleveland was 42–48, 15 1/2 games behind Detroit and in fourth place in the AL Central. The Tigers completed a three-game sweep of the Guardians in Cleveland from July 4–6, holding the Guardians to just three runs over the series. On September 4, the Tigers held an 11–game, but the Guradians finished the season 19–4 while Detroit stumbled to a 6–15 finish to allow Cleveland to clinch the division and set the record for the largest divisional comeback in MLB history. During this stretch, the Guardians won five of six head-to-head meetings against the Tigers.

The Guardians finished the season as the AL Central champion and #3-seed, while Detroit clinched the #6-seed, setting up a meeting in the best-of-three AL Wild Card Series. Game 1 was a pitchers duel between Skubal and Gavin Williams. Skubal came out on top, pitching 7 2/3 innings, giving up just one run and recording a career-high 14 strikeouts as the Tigers won 2–1. Pitching was dominant again in Game 2, as the game was tied 1–1 in the eighth inning. However, Cleveland scored five times in the inning, which included home runs by Brayan Rocchio and Bo Naylor, to win the game 6–1. The Tigers won Game 3, 6–3, on the strength of a four-run seventh inning, to take the series. Detroit then fell to the Seattle Mariners in the ALDS, 3 games to 2.

== Season-by-season results ==
Guardians vs. Tigers Season-by-Season Results
1900s (Tie, 95–95–5)

Season	Season series		at Cleveland Blues/Bronchos/Naps	at Detroit Tigers	Overall series	Notes
1901	Tigers	14‍–‍6	Tigers, 2‍–‍8	Tigers, 6‍–‍4	Tigers; 14‍–‍6	
1902	Tigers	10‍–‍8	Bronchos, 4‍–‍3	Tigers, 7‍–‍4	Tigers; 24‍–‍14	Blues renamed to Bronchos.
1903	Tigers	11‍–‍9	Naps, 8‍–‍6	Tigers, 5‍–‍1	Tigers; 35‍–‍23	Bronchos renamed to Naps.
1904	Naps	14‍–‍8‍–‍2	Naps, 8‍–‍4‍–‍2	Naps, 6‍–‍4	Tigers; 43‍–‍37‍–‍2	
1905	Naps	12‍–‍10	Naps, 7‍–‍4	Tigers, 6‍–‍5	Tigers; 53‍–‍49‍–‍2	
1906	Naps	14‍–‍8‍–‍1	Naps, 8‍–‍3	Naps, 6‍–‍5‍–‍1	Naps; 63‍–‍61‍–‍3	
1907	Tie	11‍–‍11‍–‍1	Naps, 6‍–‍5	Tigers, 6‍–‍5‍–‍1	Naps; 74‍–‍72‍–‍4	Tigers lose 1907 World Series
1908	Naps	13‍–‍9	Tigers, 6‍–‍5	Naps, 8‍–‍3	Naps; 87‍–‍81‍–‍4	Tigers win AL pennant by 1/2 game over Naps. Tigers lose 1908 World Series
1909	Tigers	14‍–‍8‍–‍1	Tigers, 6‍–‍5‍–‍1	Tigers, 8‍–‍3	Tie; 95‍–‍95‍–‍5	Tigers lose 1909 World Series

1910s (Tigers, 114–94)

Season	Season series		at Cleveland Naps/Indians	at Detroit Tigers	Overall series	Notes
1910	Tigers	13‍–‍9	Tigers, 6‍–‍5	Tigers, 7‍–‍4	Tigers; 108‍–‍104‍–‍5	
1911	Tigers	16‍–‍6	Tigers, 6‍–‍5	Tigers, 10‍–‍1	Tigers; 124‍–‍110‍–‍5	
1912	Naps	13‍–‍9	Naps, 7‍–‍4	Naps, 6‍–‍5	Tigers; 133‍–‍123‍–‍5	
1913	Naps	14‍–‍7	Naps, 8‍–‍3	Naps, 6‍–‍4	Tigers; 140‍–‍137‍–‍5	
1914	Tigers	16‍–‍6	Tigers, 7‍–‍4	Tigers, 9‍–‍2	Tigers; 156‍–‍143‍–‍5	
1915	Tigers	17‍–‍5	Tigers, 9‍–‍2	Tigers, 8‍–‍3	Tigers; 173‍–‍148‍–‍5	Naps renamed to Indians.
1916	Tie	11‍–‍11	Indians, 6‍–‍5	Tigers, 6‍–‍5	Tigers; 184‍–‍159‍–‍5	
1917	Indians	12‍–‍10	Tigers, 6‍–‍5	Indians, 7‍–‍4	Tigers; 194‍–‍171‍–‍5	
1918	Indians	10‍–‍3	Indians, 6‍–‍2	Indians, 4‍–‍1	Tigers; 197‍–‍181‍–‍5	
1919	Tigers	12‍–‍8	Tie, 5‍–‍5	Tigers, 7‍–‍3	Tigers; 209‍–‍189‍–‍5	

1920s (Tigers, 111–109–1)

Season	Season series		at Cleveland Indians	at Detroit Tigers	Overall series	Notes
1920	Indians	15‍–‍7	Indians, 8‍–‍3	Indians, 7‍–‍4	Tigers; 216‍–‍204‍–‍5	Indians win 1920 World Series
1921	Indians	13‍–‍9	Indians, 7‍–‍4	Indians, 6‍–‍5	Tigers; 225‍–‍217‍–‍5	
1922	Indians	15‍–‍7	Indians, 10‍–‍1	Tigers, 6‍–‍5	Tie; 232‍–‍232‍–‍5	
1923	Tigers	13‍–‍9	Indians, 6‍–‍5	Tigers, 8‍–‍3	Tigers; 245‍–‍241‍–‍5	
1924	Tigers	15‍–‍7	Tigers, 7‍–‍3	Tigers, 8‍–‍4	Tigers; 260‍–‍248‍–‍5	
1925	Tie	11‍–‍11‍–‍1	Tie, 5‍–‍5‍–‍1	Tie, 6‍–‍6	Tigers; 271‍–‍259‍–‍6	
1926	Tie	11‍–‍11	Indians, 7‍–‍4	Tigers, 7‍–‍4	Tigers; 282‍–‍270‍–‍6	
1927	Tigers	15‍–‍7	Tigers, 8‍–‍3	Tigers, 7‍–‍4	Tigers; 297‍–‍277‍–‍6	
1928	Tigers	12‍–‍10	Tigers, 7‍–‍4	Indians, 6‍–‍5	Tigers; 309‍–‍287‍–‍6	
1929	Tie	11‍–‍11	Tigers, 6‍–‍5	Indians, 6‍–‍5	Tigers; 320‍–‍298‍–‍6	

1930s (Tigers, 118–101–1)

Season	Season series		at Cleveland Indians	at Detroit Tigers	Overall series	Notes
1930	Tie	11‍–‍11	Indians, 7‍–‍4	Tigers, 7‍–‍4	Tigers; 331‍–‍309‍–‍6	
1931	Indians	13‍–‍9	Indians, 7‍–‍4	Indians, 6‍–‍5	Tigers; 340‍–‍322‍–‍6	
1932	Indians	11‍–‍10	Tigers, 6‍–‍5	Indians, 6‍–‍4	Tigers; 350‍–‍333‍–‍6	
1933	Tigers	12‍–‍10	Indians, 6‍–‍5	Tigers, 7‍–‍4	Tigers; 362‍–‍343‍–‍6	
1934	Tigers	16‍–‍6	Tigers, 8‍–‍3	Tigers, 8‍–‍3	Tigers; 378‍–‍349‍–‍6	Tigers lose 1934 World Series
1935	Tigers	15‍–‍7‍–‍1	Tigers, 6‍–‍5	Tigers, 9‍–‍2‍–‍1	Tigers; 393‍–‍356‍–‍7	Tigers win 1935 World Series
1936	Tigers	13‍–‍9	Indians, 7‍–‍4	Tigers, 9‍–‍2	Tigers; 406‍–‍365‍–‍7	
1937	Tie	11‍–‍11	Indians, 7‍–‍4	Tigers, 7‍–‍4	Tigers; 417‍–‍376‍–‍7	
1938	Indians	12‍–‍10	Tigers, 6‍–‍5	Indians, 7‍–‍4	Tigers; 427‍–‍388‍–‍7	
1939	Tie	11‍–‍11	Tigers, 6‍–‍5	Indians, 6‍–‍5	Tigers; 438‍–‍399‍–‍7	

1940s (Tigers, 115–105–4)

Season	Season series		at Cleveland Indians	at Detroit Tigers	Overall series	Notes
1940	Tie	11‍–‍11	Indians, 7‍–‍4	Tigers, 7‍–‍4	Tigers; 449‍–‍410‍–‍7	Tigers win AL pennant by 1 game over Indians. Tigers lose 1908 World SeriesTigers lose 1940 World Series
1941	Tigers	12‍–‍10	Tigers, 6‍–‍5	Tigers, 6‍–‍5	Tigers; 461‍–‍420‍–‍7	
1942	Tigers	13‍–‍9‍–‍2	Indians, 6‍–‍5‍–‍2	Tigers, 8‍–‍3	Tigers; 474‍–‍429‍–‍9	
1943	Indians	15‍–‍7	Indians, 8‍–‍3	Indians, 7‍–‍4	Tigers; 481‍–‍444‍–‍9	
1944	Tigers	12‍–‍10	Tigers, 7‍–‍4	Indians, 6‍–‍5	Tigers; 493‍–‍454‍–‍9	
1945	Tie	11‍–‍11	Indians, 7‍–‍4	Tigers, 7‍–‍4	Tigers; 504‍–‍465‍–‍9	Tigers win 1945 World Series
1946	Tigers	17‍–‍5	Tigers, 10‍–‍1	Tigers, 7‍–‍4	Tigers; 521‍–‍470‍–‍9	
1947	Tigers	14‍–‍8‍–‍2	Tigers, 7‍–‍4‍–‍1	Tigers, 7‍–‍4‍–‍1	Tigers; 535‍–‍478‍–‍11	
1948	Indians	13‍–‍9	Tigers, 6‍–‍5	Indians, 8‍–‍3	Tigers; 544‍–‍491‍–‍11	On June 30, Indians P Bob Lemon pitched a no-hitter against the Tigers, the first no-hitter in the rivalry. Indians win 1948 World Series
1949	Indians	13‍–‍9	Indians, 6‍–‍5	Indians, 7‍–‍4	Tigers; 553‍–‍504‍–‍11	

1950s (Indians, 136–84–1)

Season	Season series		at Cleveland Indians	at Detroit Tigers	Overall series	Notes
1950	Indians	13‍–‍9‍–‍1	Indians, 7‍–‍4	Indians, 6‍–‍5‍–‍1	Tigers; 562‍–‍517‍–‍12	
1951	Indians	17‍–‍5	Indians, 10‍–‍1	Indians, 7‍–‍4	Tigers; 567‍–‍534‍–‍12	On July 1, Indians P Bob Feller pitched a no-hitter against the Tigers, the most recent no-hitter in the rivalry.
1952	Indians	16‍–‍6	Indians, 9‍–‍2	Indians, 7‍–‍4	Tigers; 573‍–‍550‍–‍12	
1953	Indians	14‍–‍8	Indians, 9‍–‍2	Tigers, 6‍–‍5	Tigers; 581‍–‍564‍–‍12	
1954	Indians	14‍–‍8	Indians, 7‍–‍4	Indians, 7‍–‍4	Tigers; 589‍–‍578‍–‍12	Indians lose 1954 World Series
1955	Indians	12‍–‍10	Indians, 6‍–‍5	Indians, 6‍–‍5	Tigers; 599‍–‍590‍–‍12	
1956	Tie	11‍–‍11	Tigers, 7‍–‍4	Indians, 7‍–‍4	Tigers; 610‍–‍601‍–‍12	
1957	Tie	11‍–‍11	Indians, 6‍–‍5	Tigers, 6‍–‍5	Tigers; 621‍–‍612‍–‍12	
1958	Indians	14‍–‍8	Indians, 6‍–‍5	Indians, 8‍–‍3	Tigers; 629‍–‍626‍–‍12	
1959	Indians	14‍–‍8	Indians, 8‍–‍3	Indians, 6‍–‍5	Indians; 640‍–‍637‍–‍12	

1960s (Tigers, 101–83)

Season	Season series		at Cleveland Indians	at Detroit Tigers	Overall series	Notes
1960	Tigers	15‍–‍7	Tigers, 8‍–‍3	Tigers, 7‍–‍4	Tigers; 652‍–‍647‍–‍12	
1961	Tigers	12‍–‍6	Tigers, 7‍–‍2	Tigers, 5‍–‍4	Tigers; 664‍–‍653‍–‍12	AL Expansion reduces season series from 22 meetings to 18.
1962	Indians	10‍–‍8	Indians, 7‍–‍2	Tigers, 6‍–‍3	Tigers; 672‍–‍663‍–‍12	
1963	Indians	10‍–‍8	Indians, 5‍–‍4	Indians, 5‍–‍4	Tigers; 680‍–‍673‍–‍12	
1964	Indians	11‍–‍7	Indians, 7‍–‍2	Tigers, 5‍–‍4	Tigers; 687‍–‍684‍–‍12	
1965	Tie	9‍–‍9	Indians, 6‍–‍3	Tigers, 6‍–‍3	Tigers; 696‍–‍693‍–‍12	
1966	Tie	9‍–‍9	Tigers, 7‍–‍2	Indians, 7‍–‍2	Tigers; 705‍–‍702‍–‍12	
1967	Tigers	10‍–‍8	Tigers, 6‍–‍3	Indians, 5‍–‍4	Tigers; 715‍–‍710‍–‍12	
1968	Tigers	12‍–‍6	Indians, 5‍–‍4	Tigers, 8‍–‍1	Tigers; 727‍–‍716‍–‍12	Tigers win 1968 World Series
1969	Tigers	11‍–‍7	Tigers, 6‍–‍3	Tigers, 5‍–‍4	Tigers; 738‍–‍723‍–‍12	Both teams placed in AL East as the league splits into divisions.

1970s (Tigers, 90–78)

Season	Season series		at Cleveland Indians	at Detroit Tigers	Overall series	Notes
1970	Tigers	11‍–‍7	Tigers, 5‍–‍4	Tigers, 6‍–‍3	Tigers; 749‍–‍730‍–‍12	
1971	Tigers	12‍–‍6	Tigers, 5‍–‍4	Tigers, 7‍–‍2	Tigers; 761‍–‍736‍–‍12	
1972	Indians	10‍–‍8	Indians, 5‍–‍4	Indians, 5‍–‍4	Tigers; 769‍–‍746‍–‍12	
1973	Tie	9‍–‍9	Tigers, 5‍–‍4	Indians, 5‍–‍4	Tigers; 778‍–‍755‍–‍12	
1974	Tie	9‍–‍9	Indians, 5‍–‍4	Tigers, 5‍–‍4	Tigers; 787‍–‍764‍–‍12	
1975	Indians	12‍–‍6	Indians, 7‍–‍2	Indians, 5‍–‍4	Tigers; 793‍–‍776‍–‍12	
1976	Tigers	12‍–‍6	Tigers, 6‍–‍3	Tigers, 6‍–‍3	Tigers; 805‍–‍782‍–‍12	
1977	Indians	8‍–‍7	Indians, 5‍–‍2	Tigers, 5‍–‍3	Tigers; 812‍–‍790‍–‍12	AL expansion reduces season series to 15 meetings per year.
1978	Tigers	10‍–‍5	Tie, 4‍–‍4	Tigers, 6‍–‍1	Tigers; 822‍–‍795‍–‍12	
1979	Tie	6‍–‍6	Indians, 4‍–‍2	Tigers, 4‍–‍2	Tigers; 828‍–‍801‍–‍12	AL scheduling adjustments reduces season series to 13 meetings per year.

1980s (Tigers, 82–41)

Season	Season series		at Cleveland Indians	at Detroit Tigers	Overall series	Notes
1980	Tigers	10‍–‍3	Tigers, 5‍–‍2	Tigers, 5‍–‍1	Tigers; 838‍–‍804‍–‍12	
1981	Tigers	5‍–‍1	Tigers, 2‍–‍1	Tigers, 3‍–‍0	Tigers; 843‍–‍805‍–‍12	Strike-shortened season.
1982	Tigers	7‍–‍6	Indians, 4‍–‍3	Tigers, 4‍–‍2	Tigers; 850‍–‍811‍–‍12	
1983	Tigers	8‍–‍5	Indians, 4‍–‍2	Tigers, 6‍–‍1	Tigers; 858‍–‍816‍–‍12	
1984	Tigers	9‍–‍4	Tigers, 5‍–‍1	Tigers, 4‍–‍3	Tigers; 867‍–‍820‍–‍12	Tigers win 1984 World Series
1985	Tigers	8‍–‍5	Indians, 4‍–‍2	Tigers, 6‍–‍1	Tigers; 875‍–‍825‍–‍12	
1986	Tigers	9‍–‍4	Tigers, 4‍–‍3	Tigers, 5‍–‍1	Tigers; 884‍–‍829‍–‍12	
1987	Tigers	9‍–‍4	Tie, 3‍–‍3	Tigers, 6‍–‍1	Tigers; 893‍–‍833‍–‍12	
1988	Tigers	9‍–‍4	Tigers, 5‍–‍2	Tigers, 4‍–‍2	Tigers; 902‍–‍837‍–‍12	
1989	Tigers	8‍–‍5	Indians, 4‍–‍2	Tigers, 6‍–‍1	Tigers; 910‍–‍842‍–‍12	

1990s (Indians, 76–47)

Season	Season series		at Cleveland Indians	at Detroit Tigers	Overall series	Notes
1990	Tigers	8‍–‍5	Tigers, 4‍–‍3	Tigers, 4‍–‍2	Tigers; 918‍–‍847‍–‍12	
1991	Indians	7‍–‍6	Indians, 6‍–‍0	Tigers, 6‍–‍1	Tigers; 924‍–‍854‍–‍12	
1992	Tigers	8‍–‍5	Tigers, 5‍–‍2	Tie, 3‍–‍3	Tigers; 932‍–‍859‍–‍12	
1993	Tigers	7‍–‍6	Tie, 3‍–‍3	Tigers, 4‍–‍3	Tigers; 939‍–‍865‍–‍12	
1994	Indians	8‍–‍2	Indians, 6‍–‍1	Indians, 2‍–‍1	Tigers; 941‍–‍873‍–‍12	MLB realignment places Indians into AL Central, while Tigers stay in AL East, adjusting season series to 12 or 13 meetings per year. strike-shortened season. Strike cancels postseason.
1995	Indians	10‍–‍3	Indians, 6‍–‍0	Indians, 4‍–‍3	Tigers; 944‍–‍883‍–‍12	Strike-shortened season. Indians lose 1995 World Series
1996	Indians	12‍–‍0	Indians, 6‍–‍0	Indians, 6‍–‍0	Tigers; 944‍–‍895‍–‍12	
1997	Indians	6‍–‍5	Indians, 4‍–‍2	Tigers, 3‍–‍2	Tigers; 949‍–‍901‍–‍12	Introduction of interleague play decreases meetings from 12 or 13 to 11. Indians lose 1997 World Series
1998	Indians	9‍–‍3	Indians, 4‍–‍2	Indians, 5‍–‍1	Tigers; 952‍–‍910‍–‍12	MLB's expansion and realignment moves the Tigers to the AL Central with the Indians, increasing meetings to 12 per year.
1999	Indians	8‍–‍5	Indians, 4‍–‍2	Indians, 4‍–‍3	Tigers; 957‍–‍918‍–‍12	

2000s (Indians, 95–85)

Season	Season series		at Cleveland Indians	at Detroit Tigers	Overall series	Notes
2000	Tigers	7‍–‍6	Indians, 4‍–‍3	Tigers, 4‍–‍2	Tigers; 964‍–‍924‍–‍12	
2001	Indians	13‍–‍6	Indians, 7‍–‍2	Indians, 6‍–‍4	Tigers; 970‍–‍937‍–‍12	MLB changed to an unbalanced schedule in 2001, resulting in 19 meetings per year.
2002	Indians	10‍–‍9	Tie, 5‍–‍5	Indians, 5‍–‍4	Tigers; 979‍–‍947‍–‍12	
2003	Indians	12‍–‍7	Indians, 6‍–‍3	Indians, 6‍–‍4	Tigers; 986‍–‍959‍–‍12	
2004	Tigers	10‍–‍9	Tie, 5‍–‍5	Tigers, 5‍–‍4	Tigers; 996‍–‍968‍–‍12	
2005	Indians	12‍–‍6	Tigers, 5‍–‍4	Indians, 8‍–‍1	Tigers; 1,002‍–‍980‍–‍12	New unbalanced schedule in 2005, resulting in 18 or 19 meetings per year.
2006	Tigers	13‍–‍6	Tigers, 6‍–‍3	Tigers, 7‍–‍3	Tigers; 1,015‍–‍986‍–‍12	Tigers lose 2006 World Series
2007	Indians	12‍–‍6	Indians, 6‍–‍3	Indians, 6‍–‍3	Tigers; 1,021‍–‍998‍–‍12	18 meetings per year.
2008	Indians	11‍–‍7	Indians, 6‍–‍3	Indians, 5‍–‍4	Tigers; 1,028‍–‍1,009‍–‍12	
2009	Tigers	14‍–‍4	Tigers, 7‍–‍2	Tigers, 7‍–‍2	Tigers; 1,042‍–‍1,013‍–‍12	

2010s (Indians, 102–83)

Season	Season series		at Cleveland Indians	at Detroit Tigers	Overall series	Notes
2010	Tie	9‍–‍9	Indians, 8‍–‍1	Tigers, 8‍–‍1	Tigers; 1,051‍–‍1,022‍–‍12	
2011	Tigers	12‍–‍6	Indians, 5‍–‍4	Tigers, 8‍–‍1	Tigers; 1,063‍–‍1,028‍–‍12	
2012	Indians	10‍–‍8	Indians, 6‍–‍3	Tigers, 5‍–‍4	Tigers; 1,071‍–‍1,038‍–‍12	Tigers lose 2012 World Series
2013	Tigers	15‍–‍4	Tigers, 9‍–‍1	Tigers, 6‍–‍3	Tigers; 1,086‍–‍1,042‍–‍12	Both AL and NL having balanced teams leads to a balanced schedule of 19 games per season.
2014	Tigers	11‍–‍8	Tigers, 6‍–‍4	Tigers, 5‍–‍4	Tigers; 1,097‍–‍1,050‍–‍12	
2015	Tigers	11‍–‍7	Tigers, 6‍–‍3	Tigers, 5‍–‍4	Tigers; 1,108‍–‍1,057‍–‍12	
2016	Indians	14‍–‍4	Indians, 7‍–‍2	Indians, 7‍–‍2	Tigers; 1,112‍–‍1,071‍–‍12	Indians lose 2016 World Series
2017	Indians	13‍–‍6	Indians, 6‍–‍3	Indians, 7‍–‍3	Tigers; 1,118‍–‍1,084‍–‍12	
2018	Indians	13‍–‍6	Indians, 8‍–‍2	Indians, 5‍–‍4	Tigers; 1,124‍–‍1,097‍–‍12	
2019	Indians	18‍–‍1	Indians, 10‍–‍0	Indians, 8‍–‍1	Tigers; 1,125‍–‍1,115‍–‍12	

2020s (Indians/Guardians, 62–46)

Season	Season series		at Cleveland Indians/Guardians	at Detroit Tigers	Overall series	Notes
2020	Indians	7‍–‍3	Tigers, 2‍–‍1	Indians, 6‍–‍1	Tigers; 1,128‍–‍1,122‍–‍12	Season shortened to 60 games (with 10 meetings) due to COVID-19 pandemic. Indians win 20 straight meetings (April 11, 2019 through August 16, 2020).
2021	Indians	12‍–‍7	Indians, 6‍–‍3	Indians, 6‍–‍4	Tigers; 1,135‍–‍1,134‍–‍12	
2022	Guardians	10‍–‍9	Guardians, 6‍–‍3	Tigers, 6‍–‍4	Tie; 1,144‍–‍1,144‍–‍12	Indians renamed to Guardians.
2023	Tigers	9‍–‍4	Tigers, 5‍–‍2	Tigers, 4‍–‍2	Tigers; 1,153‍–‍1,148‍–‍12	Schedule structure modified this season to allow every team to play one series against every interleague team. Shortening meetings from 19 to 13 games.
2024	Guardians	7‍–‍6	Guardians, 4‍–‍3	Tie, 3‍–‍3	Tigers; 1,159‍–‍1,155‍–‍12	
2024 ALDS	Guardians	3‍–‍2	Guardians, 2‍–‍1	Tie, 1‍–‍1	Tigers; 1,161‍–‍1,158‍–‍12	First playoff meeting.
2025	Guardians	8‍–‍5	Tigers, 4‍–‍2	Guardians, 6‍–‍1	Tie; 1,166‍–‍1,166‍–‍12	Guardians overcome a 15 1/2 game deficit to the Tigers in July to win the division, setting a record for largest such comeback.
2025 ALWCS	Tigers	2‍–‍1	Tigers, 2‍–‍1	–	Tigers; 1,168‍–‍1,167‍–‍12	
2026	Guardians	10‍–‍3	Guardians, 5‍–‍1	Guardians, 5‍–‍2	Guardians; 1,177‍–‍1,171‍–‍12	

Summary of Results

Season	Season series		at Cleveland Guardians	at Detroit Tigers	Notes
Regular season games	Guardians	1,173‍–‍1,167‍–‍12	Guardians, 638‍–‍535‍–‍7	Tigers, 632‍–‍535‍–‍5	
Postseason games	Tie	4‍–‍4	Tie, 3‍–‍3	Tie, 1‍–‍1	
Postseason series	Tie	1‍–‍1	N/A	N/A	ALWCS: 2025; ALDS: 2024
Regular and postseason games	Guardians	1,177‍–‍1,171‍–‍12	Guardians, 641‍–‍538‍–‍7	Tigers, 633‍–‍536‍–‍5	

== Connections between the two teams ==
=== Notable players ===
Over 200 players have played for both Cleveland and Detroit in their career, including the following notable players:

Key
^ Inducted into the Baseball Hall of Fame
* Active player

Player	Pos	Cleveland tenure	Detroit tenure
Hank Aguirre	P	1955–1957	1958–1967
^ Earl Averill	OF	1929–1939	1939–1940
Al Benton	P	1949–1950	1938–1942, 1945–1948
Ray Boone	1B/3B	1948–1953	1953–1958
George Burns	1B	1920–1921, 1924–1928	1914–1917
Rocky Colavito	OF	1955–1959, 1965–1967	1960–1963
Roy Cullenbine	OF/1B	1943–1945	1938–1939, 1945–1947
^ Larry Doby	OF	1947–1955, 1958	1959
Dick Donovan	P	1962–1965	1954
Hoot Evers	OF	1955–1956	1946–1952
Cecil Fielder	OF	1998	1990–1996
Tito Francona	1B	1959–1964	1958
Travis Fryman	3B/SS	1990–1997	1998–2002
Juan González	OF	2001, 2005	2000
Ted Gray	P	1955	1946–1954
Jim Hegan	C	1941–1942, 1946–1957	1958
Willie Horton	OF	1978	1963–1977
Art Houtteman	P	1953–1957	1945–1953
Vern Kennedy	P	1942–1944	1938–1939
Harvey Kuenn	OF/3B/SS	1960	1952–1959
Victor Martinez	C/1B	2002–2009	2011–2018
José Mesa	P	1992–1998	2007
Andrew Miller	P	2016–2018	2006–2007
^Jack Morris	P	1994	1977–1990
Don Mossi	P	1954–1958	1959–1963
Ray Narleski	P	1954–1958	1959
^Hal Newhouser	P	1954–1955	1939–1953
Lance Parrish	C	1993	1977–1986
Jim Perry	P	1959–1963, 1974–1975	1973
Jhonny Peralta	SS	2003–2010	2010–2013
George Uhle	P	1919–1928, 1936	1929–1933
Gee Walker	OF	1941	1932–1937
Vic Wertz	1B/OF	1954–1958	1947–1951, 1961–1963

== See also ==
- AL Central
- Major League Baseball rivalries
