= Alan Shaw =

Alan or Allan Shaw may refer to:

== Sportsmen ==
- Alan Shaw (footballer) (born 1923), Australian rules footballer
- Alan Shaw (bowls) (born 1941), lawn bowler from Jersey

== Others ==
- Alan H. Shaw, Norfolk Southern chief executive officer
- Alan Lee Shaw (active since 1977), English guitarist
- Allan Shaw (1927–1989), Anglican priest
- A. G. L. Shaw (Alan George Lewers Shaw, 1916–2012), Australian historian

== See also ==
- Al Shaw (disambiguation)
- Allanshaw (1874–1893), British iron sailing ship
