= List of Detroit Tigers owners and executives =

Owners, executives, and managers of Major League Baseball's Detroit Tigers. Current personnel are indicated in bold.

== Team owners ==
Name	Years
George Vanderbeck	1894–1900
James D. Burns	1901
Samuel F. Angus	1902–1903
William H. Yawkey	1904–1907
Frank Navin	1908–1935
Walter Briggs, Sr.	1935–1952
Walter Briggs, Jr.	1952–1956
Joseph A. Thomas	1956–1960
Kenyon Brown	1956–1960
Carl E. Lee	1956–1960
George L. Coleman	1956–1960
Paul O'Bryan	1956–1960
Freddie Woolworth	1956–1960
Bing Crosby	1956–1960
Frederick A. Knorr, II	1956–1961
Harvey R. Hansen, Sr.	1956–1961
William H. McCoy	1956–1961
John Fetzer	1956–1983
Tom Monaghan	1983–1992
Mike Ilitch	1992–2017
Christopher Ilitch	2017–present

== Presidents ==
Name	Years
James D. Burns	1901
Samuel F. Angus	1902–03
William H. Yawkey	1904–07
Frank J. Navin	1908–35
Walter O. Briggs Sr.	1936–52
Walter O. Briggs Jr.	1952–56
Frederick A. Knorr II	1957
Harvey R. Hansen, Sr.	1957–59
Bill DeWitt	1959–60
John E. Fetzer	1961–78
Jim Campbell	1978–90
Glenn E. "Bo" Schembechler	1990–92
Michael Ilitch	1992–95, 2001
John McHale Jr.	1995–2001
Dave Dombrowski	2002–2015
Al Avila	2016–2022
Scott Harris	2022–present

== General Managers ==
Name	Years
Mickey Cochrane	1936–1938
Jack Zeller	1938–1945
George Trautman	1946
Billy Evans	1946–1951
Charlie Gehringer	1952–1953
Muddy Ruel	1954–1956
Walter Briggs	1957
John McHale	1957–1959
Rick Ferrell	1959–1962
Jim Campbell	1963–1983
Bill Lajoie	1984–1990
Joe McDonald	1991–1992
Jerry Walker	1993
Joe Klein	1994–1995
Randy Smith	1996–2002
Dave Dombrowski	2002–2015
Al Avila	2015–2022
Jeff Greenberg	2023–present
