= Burns Park =

Burns Park may refer to:

- Burns Park, a historic residential district in Ann Arbor, Michigan
- Burns Park (North Little Rock, Arkansas), a park
- Burns Park (Detroit, Michigan), a former baseball park (1901-1902)
- Burns Park (Condon, Oregon), a park on OR 19 in Condon, Oregon
