= Frederick Shaw =

Frederick Shaw may refer to:

- Frederick Davis Shaw (1909–1977), Canadian politician
- Frederick H. Shaw (1864–1924), British politician and economist
- Frederick Shaw (British Army officer) (1861–1942), British Army general
- Sir Frederick Shaw, 3rd Baronet (1799–1876), Irish Conservative member of parliament
- Frederick Shaw (Queensland politician) (1824–1902), Australian politician
- Frederick Shaw (Tasmanian politician), Australian politician
- Frederick Shaw (cricketer) (1892–1935), Irish cricketer and British Army officer
- Frederick B. Shaw (1869–1957), United States Army officer
- Frederick John Freshwater Shaw (1885–1936), British botanist and mycologist

== See also ==
- Fred Shaw (disambiguation), several people
