= Al Shaw =

Al Shaw may refer to:

- Al Shaw (catcher) (1873–1958), American baseball player
- Al Shaw (outfielder) (1881–1974), American baseball player

== See also ==
- Alfred Shaw (disambiguation)
- Albert Shaw (disambiguation)
- Alan Shaw (disambiguation)
