= Alfred Shaw (disambiguation) =

Alfred Shaw (1842–1907) was a British cricketer.

Alfred Shaw may also refer to:

- Alfred P. Shaw (1895–?), American architect
- Al Shaw (catcher) (Alfred Shaw, 1873–1958), American baseball player
- Alf Shaw, racing driver, 1960 Grand Prix motorcycle racing season
- Alfred Shaw (motorcyclist); see Rider deaths in motorcycle racing
- Alfred Shaw (painter); see Mary Shaw (contralto)

== See also ==
- Al Shaw (disambiguation)
- Fred Shaw (disambiguation)
