= Albert Shaw =

Albert Shaw may refer to:

- Albert D. Shaw (1841–1901), U.S. Representative from New York
- Albert Shaw (footballer) (fl. 1924), English footballer (Grimsby Town)
- Albert Shaw (journalist) (1857–1947), American journalist and academic

== See also ==
- Al Shaw (disambiguation)
