= Fred Shaw =

Fred Shaw may refer to:

- Dupee Shaw (1859–1938), American Major League Baseball player
- Fred Shaw (footballer) (1909–1994), English footballer
- Fred Shaw (socialist activist) (1881–1951), British socialist activist and trade unionist
- Fred Shaw (rugby union) (1871–1938), English rugby union player

== See also ==
- Frederick Shaw (disambiguation)
- Alfred Shaw (disambiguation)
