= Jhonny Peralta =

Dominican baseball player (born 1982)

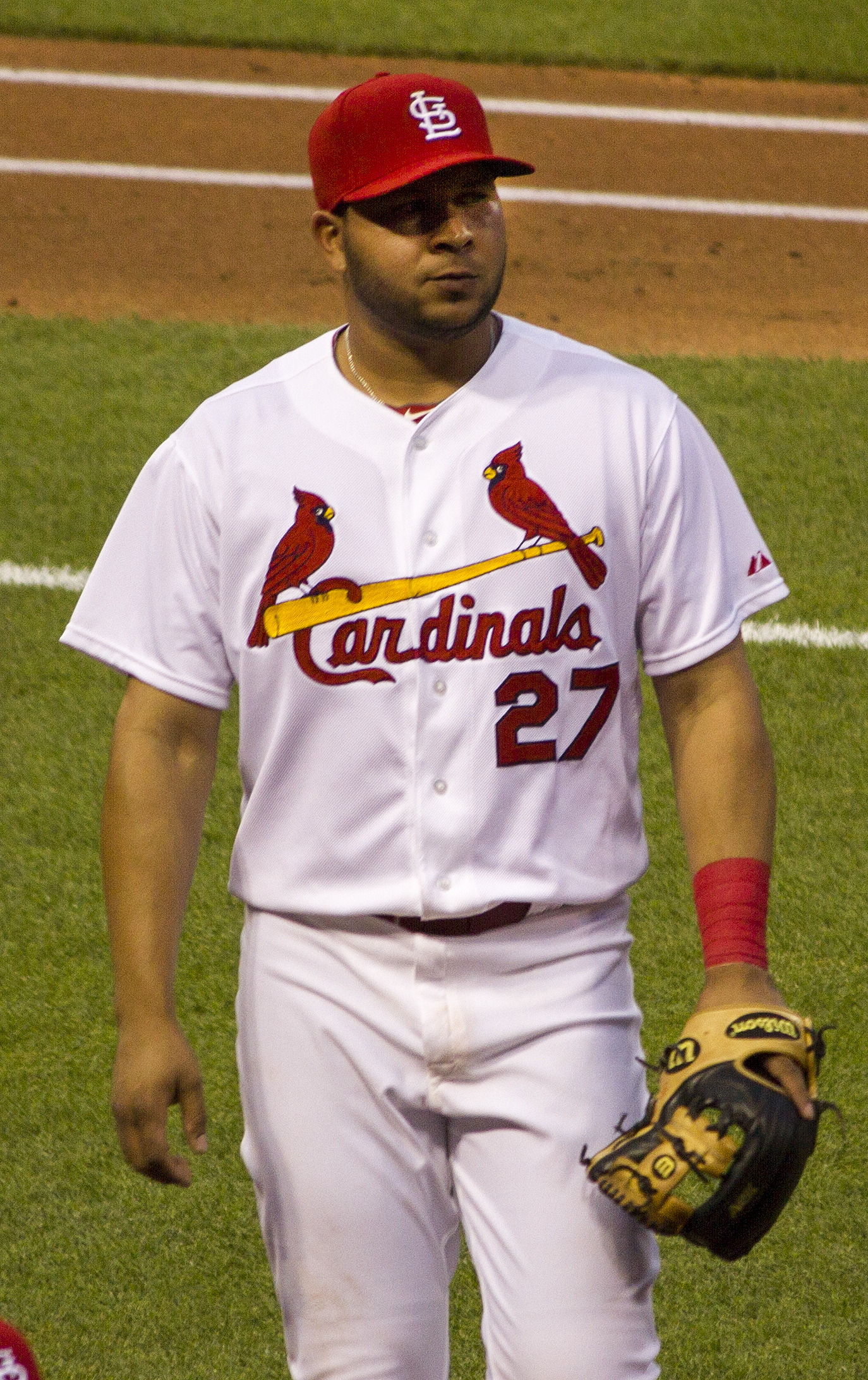
- Peralta with the St. Louis Cardinals
- Shortstop
- Born: May 28, 1982 (age 44); Santiago, Dominican Republic
- Batted: Right Threw: Right

MLB debut
- June 12, 2003, for the Cleveland Indians

Last MLB appearance
- June 6, 2017, for the St. Louis Cardinals

MLB statistics
- Batting average: .267
- Home runs: 202
- Runs batted in: 873
- Stats at Baseball Reference

Teams
- Cleveland Indians (2003–2010); Detroit Tigers (2010–2013); St. Louis Cardinals (2014–2017)

Career highlights and awards
- 3× All-Star (2011, 2013, 2015)

Jhonny Antonio Peralta (born May 28, 1982) is a Dominican former professional baseball shortstop who played 15 seasons in Major League Baseball (MLB). The Cleveland Indians signed him as an amateur free agent in his native Dominican Republic in 1999, and he made his major league debut for the Indians on June 12, 2003. He subsequently played for the Detroit Tigers and St. Louis Cardinals. A solid hitter with power, Peralta has rated average defensively. He throws and bats right-handed, stands 6 feet 2 inches (1.88 m), and weighs 225 pounds (102 kg).

Peralta was the 2004 Indians Minor League Player of the Year as well as the International League Most Valuable Player for one of Cleveland's minor league affiliates, the Buffalo Bisons, after batting .326 with 44 doubles, 15 home runs and 86 runs batted in. Buffalo was also the International League champion that same season.

Each year from 2005 through 2015, Peralta reached at least 100 hits, and double figures in both home runs and doubles. He is a three-time MLB All-Star selection. He set single-season home run records for shortstops for two franchises – for the Indians in 2005, and the Cardinals in 2014. While a member of the Tigers in 2013, he served a 50-game suspension for his role in the Biogenesis performance-enhancing drug scandal. In 2017 he signed with the Boston Red Sox, but was released less than a month later without having played in a game for the team.

== Playing career (1999–2017) ==
=== Minor leagues (1999–2004) ===
The Cleveland Indians signed Peralta as an amateur free agent in 1999 and assigned him to the Dominican Summer League Indians that season. Peralta batted .303 with a .398 on-base percentage (OBP) and a .514 slugging percentage (SLG); 41 percent of his hits went for extra bases. Those figures were boosted by an unsustainable .373 batting average on balls in play (BABIP). (Note: Batting average on balls in play, or BABIP, is the calculation of the batting average of all playable batted balls only. It excludes strikeouts and home runs and includes sacrifice flies. This statistic is widely variable, as defense, "luck", and opposing team's talent levels all affect BABIP. Most hitters' BABIP falls within or close to the range of .290 and .300. According to Baseball Reference, Peralta's career BABIP through 2013 was .315.) Nevertheless, the Indians promoted him aggressively.

In 2000, the 18-year-old Peralta played for the Columbus RedStixx, the Single-A affiliate of the Indians in the South Atlantic League. He batted .241 with three home runs and 34 runs batted in (RBI) in 106 games, playing all but one game at shortstop (the other was at third base). The following season, he advanced to the Kinston Indians, Cleveland's High-A affiliate in the Carolina League. In 125 games, he batted .240 with seven home runs and 47 RBI.

In 2002, Peralta moved up to the Double-A Akron Aeros, where he hit .281 with 15 home runs and 62 RBI in 130 games. In 2003, he batted .257 with a home run and 21 RBI in 63 games with the Triple-A Buffalo Bisons. After his 2003 call up to the major leagues, Peralta began to draw widespread attention for his hitting with the Aeros and Bisons.

In 2004, Peralta batted .326 with 15 home runs and 86 RBI in 138 games with the Bisons. He also scored 109 runs and stroked 44 doubles, the most ever in the Bisons' modern era, followed by 39 for Kevin Pillar in 2014. This offensive leap helped him win the International League Most Valuable Player Award that year, and Buffalo went on to win the Governors' Cup as the International League champions. He also received the Lou Boudreau Award as the Indians' 2004 Minor League Player of the Year.

=== Cleveland Indians (2003–10) ===
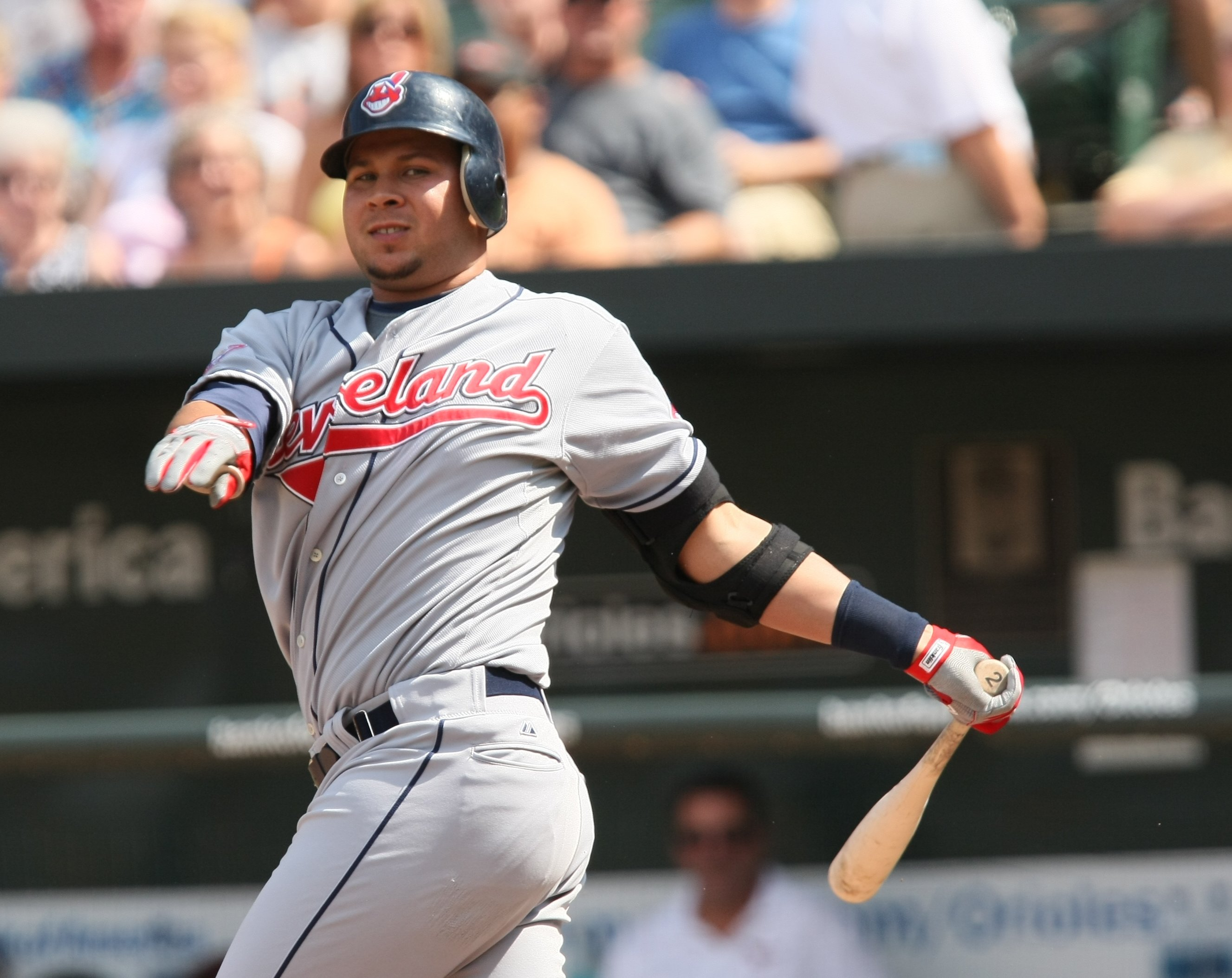
Peralta batting for the Cleveland Indians in 2009

Peralta made his Major League debut with Cleveland on June 12, 2003, appearing in the eighth inning as a defensive replacement for Casey Blake at third base. He posted a .227 batting average with four home runs and 21 RBI in 77 games with Cleveland in 2003. The next season, despite his accomplishments at the Triple-A level, Peralta saw just 25 at bats (AB) in eight games at the major league level due to the presence of perennial fan-favorite Omar Vizquel, who left the Indians as a free agent following the 2004 season.

Peralta became Cleveland's full-time starting shortstop early in 2005 and batted .292 with 24 home runs and 78 RBI in 141 games. His home run and RBI totals set a franchise record for an Indians shortstop. On July 3, he became affixed in the Indians' third slot in the batting order. Cleveland then won 23 of their next 33 games to put them one game behind the New York Yankees and Oakland Athletics in the Wild Card race late in August. He joined Woodie Held as the only shortstops in Indians history to hit at least 20 home runs.

On March 10, 2006, Peralta agreed to a five-year, $13 million contract with an option for a sixth year to stay with the Indians until the 2011 season. However, his 2006 season saw a decline both offensively and defensively from the previous season. He finished with a .268 average, 13 home runs and 68 RBI in 149 games. At the start of spring training in 2007, it was revealed that Peralta suffered from vision problems in 2006 and had corrective LASIK eye surgery to deal with it.

During the 2007 season, Peralta improved upon his 2006 numbers, and hit .270 with 21 home runs and 72 RBI in 152 games. The Indians won the American League Central, and in the 2007 American League Division Series, Peralta hit safely in every game of the four-game series, batting .467 with three doubles, 2 RBI and four walks. After eliminating the New York Yankees in the ALDS, the Indians advanced to the 2007 American League Championship Series to face the Boston Red Sox. In Game 2, Peralta hit a three-run home run off Red Sox pitcher Curt Schilling for his first career postseason home run. He recorded 4 total RBI in Cleveland's 13–6 win. He added another three-run home run in Game 4, a 7–3 Indians win. Peralta hit .259 with two home runs and 8 RBI in the seven-game series, which was eventually won by the Red Sox.

Peralta batted .276 with 23 home runs and a career-high 89 RBI in 154 games during the 2008 season.

After breaking an 0-for-8 skid on May 1, 2009, against the Detroit Tigers, Peralta's 86th career home run with the Indians broke the team record for shortstops that Woodie Held held. His solo home run provided the margin of victory for Cleveland in a 6–5 score. Peralta finished the season batting .254 with 11 home runs and 83 RBI in 151 games.

Peralta hit his first career inside-the-park home run against Tigers pitcher Andy Oliver on July 18, 2010. The home run came on a play in which outfielder Ryan Raburn crashed through the bullpen door attempting to catch the ball. In 91 games with Cleveland, Peralta batted .246 with seven home runs and 43 RBI.

=== Detroit Tigers (2010–13) ===
Ten days after hitting his first inside-the-park-home-run against the Tigers, the Indians traded Peralta to the Tigers for minor league pitcher Giovanni Soto and cash considerations. Because the club had already retired the number 2 – Peralta's uniform number as an Indian – in honor of Hall of Famer Charlie Gehringer, he chose the number 27 instead. On July 30, Peralta hit a home run in his first plate appearance (PA) as a Tiger, and then, another, two plate appearances later. After joining the Tigers, he returned to primarily playing shortstop. He made 46 appearances shortstop, nine at third base, four at designated hitter and two at first base for the remainder of the 2010 season. Peralta hit .253 with eight home runs and 38 RBI in 57 games with the Tigers after the trade. On November 2, 2010, the Tigers declined Peralta's option for 2011, making him a free agent.

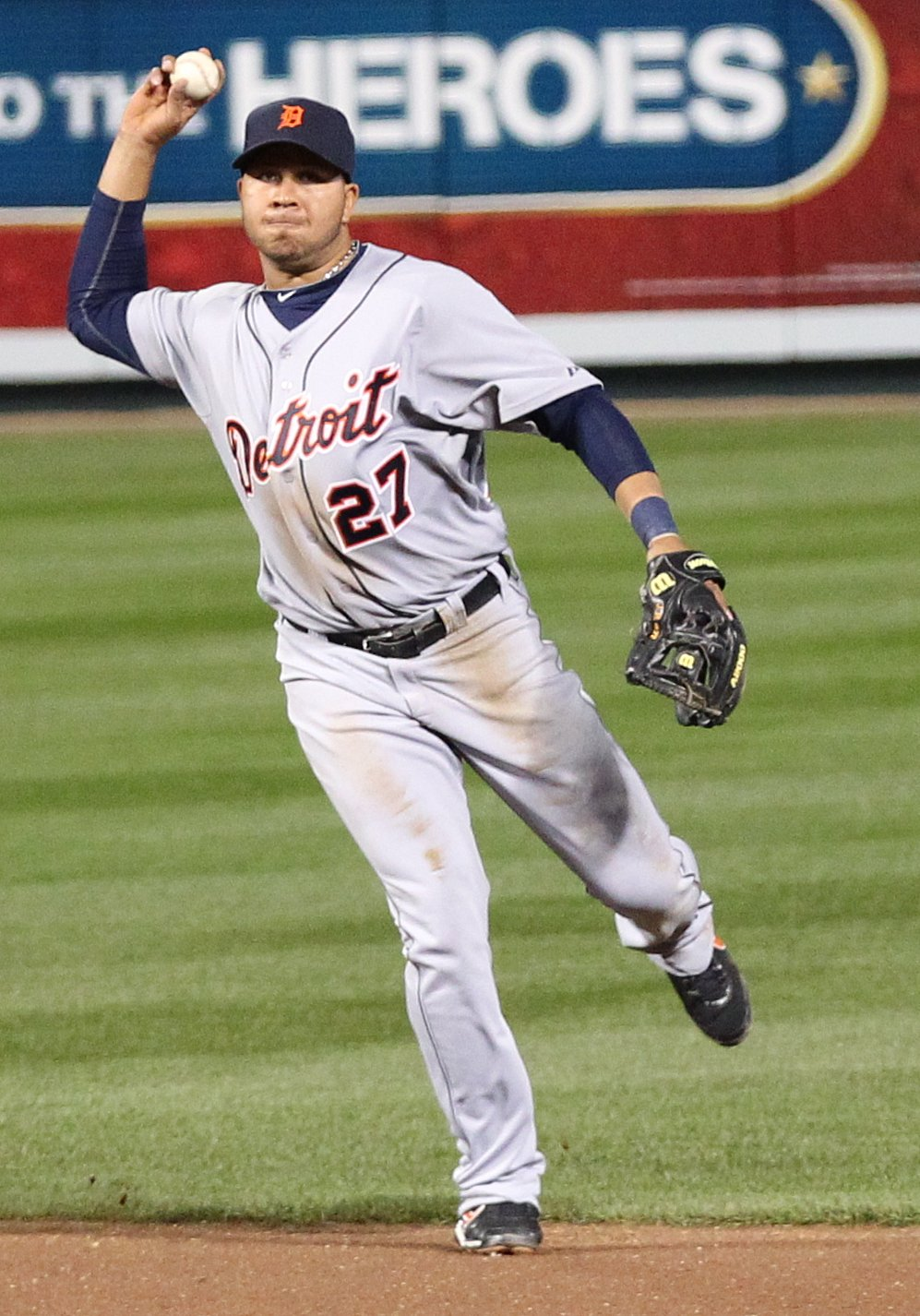
Peralta with the Detroit Tigers in 2011

On November 8, 2010, Peralta signed a two-year, $11.25 million contract to remain with the Tigers. The deal also included a club option for the 2013 season. He was named to his first career All-Star Game as a replacement for Derek Jeter on July 8, 2011. Peralta finished the regular season with a career-high .299 batting average and collected 21 home runs and 86 RBI in 146 games. Playing a full season at shortstop for the first time since 2008, he committed just seven errors in 608 chances for a career-best .988 fielding percentage. The Tigers won the AL Central, and in the postseason, Peralta played in 11 of the Tigers' games, hitting .220 with three doubles, two home runs and 3 RBI. The Tigers made it to the 2011 American League Championship Series, where they lost in six games to the Texas Rangers.

Peralta hit his first walk-off home run as a Tiger against the Chicago White Sox on May 4, 2012. He batted .239 with 13 home runs and 63 RBI in 150 games. The Tigers returned to the postseason as the AL Central winner. After helping the Tigers advance past the Oakland Athletics in the 2012 American League Division Series, Peralta stepped up in the 2012 American League Championship Series. In the series-clinching Game 4 against the New York Yankees, Peralta hit two home runs and drove in three runs to help Detroit to an 8–3 win and a place in the 2012 World Series. While Peralta did homer in Game 1 of the World Series, it would prove to be his only hit of the series. The Tigers would go on to lose in a four-game sweep to the San Francisco Giants. In 13 total playoff games, Peralta hit .260 with three home runs and 5 RBI. After the season, the Tigers exercised Peralta's club option for 2013, keeping him in Detroit for another season.

On June 20, 2013, Peralta hit a walkoff two-run home run off Boston Red Sox closer Andrew Bailey to secure the Tigers' victory, 4–3. It was the Tigers' first walkoff win of the season. That season, Peralta was named to his second AL All-Star team as a reserve shortstop. This was his first selection by player vote (his previous selection was as an injury replacement). Peralta entered the All-Star break with a .303 batting average, eight home runs and 46 RBI.

However, a cloud overshadowed what was shaping to be one of Peralta's best seasons. On August 5, he accepted a 50-game suspension for his role in the Biogenesis performance-enhancing drug scandal. On September 25, the Tigers announced that Peralta would be activated to the 40-man roster following his suspension. He returned two days later for the final series of the regular season. In his shortened regular season, Peralta batted a career-high .303 with 11 home runs and 55 RBI in 107 games.

Because Detroit had acquired rookie shortstop José Iglesias from the Boston during the suspension, manager Jim Leyland installed Peralta mainly in left field for the remainder of the season and playoffs. The Tigers, including general manager Dave Dombrowski, expressed exoneration of Peralta's breach following the suspension. Despite derisive chants from fans and actions such as the San Francisco Giants leaving similar violator Melky Cabrera off their playoff roster during their World Series-winning season, the Tigers saw the 50-game suspension as sufficient punishment.

With the Tigers down 3–0 and facing elimination against the Athletics in Game 4 of the American League Division Series (ALDS), Peralta connected for a three-run home run in the fifth inning. It was "perhaps the biggest swing of the playoffs for the Tigers so far", surmised sportswriter Noah Trister. The Tigers eventually won the ALDS but lost to the Red Sox in the American League Championship Series. In 10 playoff games, Peralta batted .333 with four doubles, one home run and 6 RBI.

=== St. Louis Cardinals (2014–2017) ===
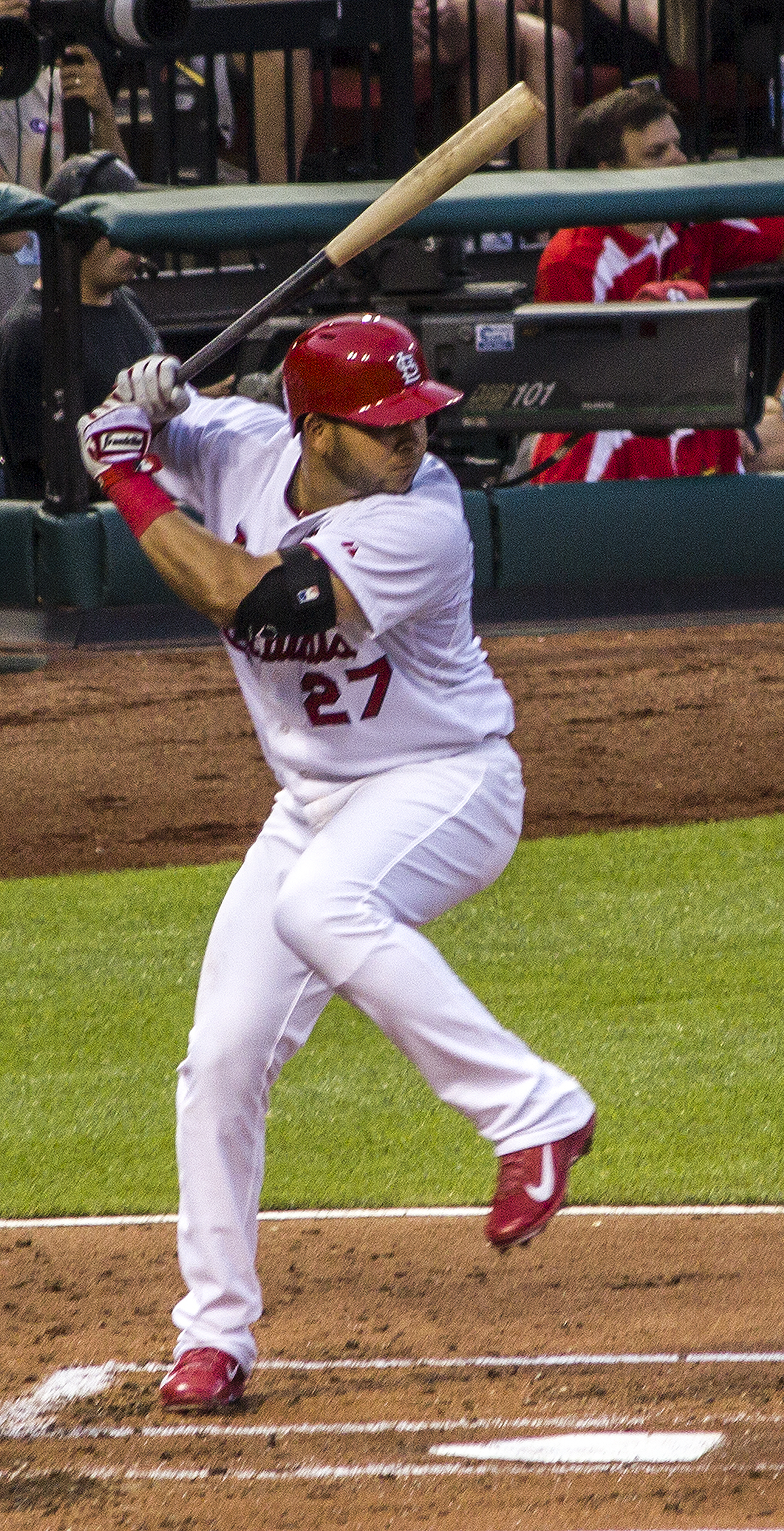
Peralta batting in 2014

On November 24, 2013, Peralta signed a four-year contract worth $53 million with the St. Louis Cardinals. Featuring a declining salary structure, the contract commenced with his salary at $15.5 million in 2014, then $15 million, $12.5 million, and finally $10 million in 2017. Without a qualifying offer from the Tigers, the Cardinals were not obligated to return a first-round draft pick.

==== Controversy with free agent signing ====
However, the signing drew scrutiny because he had served the suspension for his connection to the Biogenesis scandal. Arizona Diamondbacks pitcher Brad Ziegler spearheaded a cacophony of complaints that the 50-game suspension was not enough of a deterrent, because he viewed that it failed to prevent players who violated the collective bargaining agreement's banned substances use policy to receive compensation for their performances equal to those who had not been found to violate the policy. Cabrera had signed with the Toronto Blue Jays for two years and $16 million following his suspension in 2012; however, little protest had arisen from those relatively modest figures.

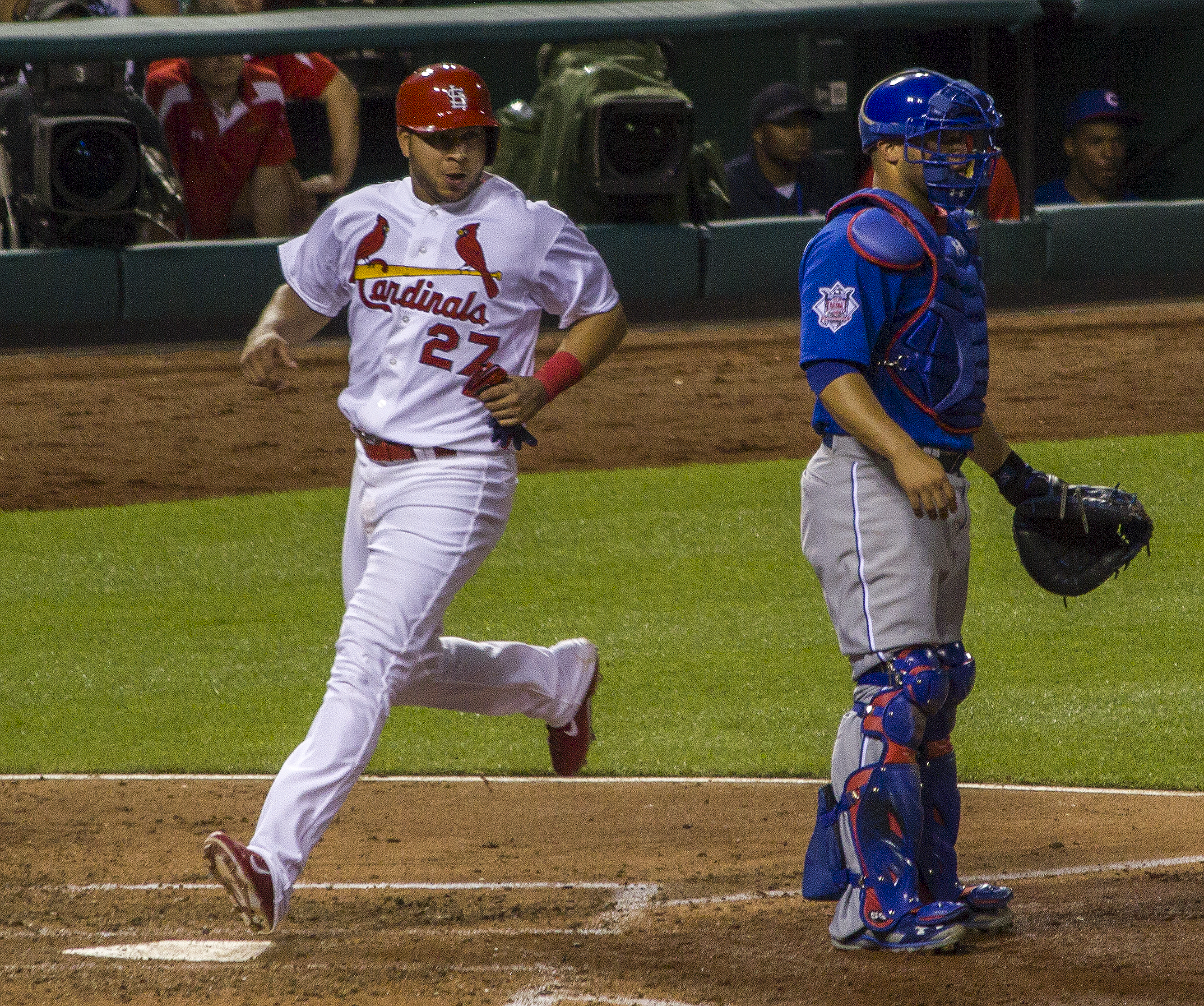
Peralta scoring in 2014

Cardinals general manager John Mozeliak countered by illustrating that the Cardinals were not self-appointed "morality police. ... Character and makeup are something we weigh into our decision-making. In his case, he admitted what he did, he took responsibility for it. I feel like he has paid for his mistakes, and obviously if he were to make another one, then it would be a huge disappointment." New teammate and Cardinals outfielder Matt Holliday, an outspoken critic of performance-enhancing drugs (PED), declared indemnity. "I am against PEDs and always will be," he said at the Cardinals' winter fan festival. "But I also am a forgiving person and he served his suspension. That's the rules of the game. I'm happy to have him as a teammate. ... His teammates in Detroit welcomed him back." Manager Mike Matheny echoed a similar averment.

==== 2014 ====
On April 27, 2014, Peralta hit his first multi-homer game in Busch Stadium against the Pittsburgh Pirates. It also gave him six home runs for the month, surpassing Édgar Rentería's club record of five in April he set for shortstops in 2000. Peralta surpassed another team record for shortstops Rentería set in 2000, hitting his 17th home run of the season on August 20. While he produced his usual amount of home runs, his batting average was inconsistent early in the season. In each month from April to August, it progressed from .196 to .237 to .241 to .252 to .270.

With the second-place Pirates just a game behind in the standings with two left to play for the season, Peralta drove in the go-ahead run in the 10th inning against the Diamondbacks as part of a three-RBI night. He ended the season leading the Cardinals in home runs with 21. Peralta also led the club in doubles (38) and was second in slugging percentage (.443), RBI (75), total bases (248) and games played (157). His batting average was .263 and he posted an OBP of .336.

In his first season in the National League (NL), Peralta ranked seventh in the league in doubles and sixth in games played. According to Baseball Reference's advanced metrics, he had his best season defensively, finishing fifth in the NL among all players – third among shortstops – with 2.5 defensive Wins Above Replacement (dWAR). His combined offensive and defensive WAR placed tenth among all NL players at 5.8. In counting and rate defensive statistics among NL shortstops, he finished second in double plays turned (98), and fifth in fielding percentage (.981), putouts (191), and assists (418). On October 23, The Sporting News announced Peralta was selected to their NL All-Star team. He finished 15th in the NL MVP voting, the first time in his career he received consideration for the award.

==== Third All-Star selection (2015) ====
On May 25, 2015, Peralta hit a walk-off home run in the tenth inning against the Diamondbacks, his seventh home run of the season. In his time with the Cardinals through June 1, he ranked first in extra-base hits (80) and home runs (29), third in RBI (101), second in slugging percentage (.461) and OPS (.804) and fourth in on-base percentage (.361) among MLB shortstops. On defense, he did not rely heavily on range, but on smart positioning and making the routine plays, qualifying him for +1 defensive runs saved after saving 17 the year before.

Peralta was selected as the National League's starting shortstop in the All-Star Game at Great American Ball Park in Cincinnati after batting .298 with 13 home runs and 46 RBI over the first 87 games in 2015. After the All-Star break, he batted .243, and produced three doubles and two home runs over the final two months, or 54 games. Peralta finished the season with a .275 batting average, 17 home runs, 71 RBI, 26 doubles, and 159 hits in 155 games played. In the 2015 National League Division Series, Peralta hit just .143 with an RBI as the Cardinals were defeated by the Chicago Cubs in four games.

==== Final years with St. Louis (2016-2017) ====
Thumb injuries caused Peralta to miss significant time in 2016. While fielding a ball during spring training on March 7, he damaged an ulnar collateral ligament in his left thumb. He underwent surgery to repair the ligament and was expected to miss 10 to 12 weeks of play. He began a rehabilitation assignment with the Single-A Peoria Chiefs on May 20, 2016, and the club activated him for game action before a series against Cincinnati on June 7. The Cardinals placed Peralta back on the disabled list on July 19 due to swelling in the left thumb, although that injury appeared unrelated to the torn ligament and an MRI had revealed no structural damage, per Mozeliak. He was activated on August 2. Due to the emergence of shortstop prospect Aledmys Díaz, the Cardinals began to shift Peralta over to third base upon his return. Peralta finished the 2016 season batting .260 with eight home runs and 29 RBI in 80 games.

In 2017, Peralta continued to start at third base for the Cardinals. However, he struggled to begin the season, posting a slash line of .204/.259/.204 with no home runs or RBI in 21 games. He was designated for assignment by the Cardinals on June 9, 2017 and he was released on June 13.

=== Boston Red Sox ===
The Boston Red Sox signed Peralta on June 23, 2017. He was initially assigned to the Triple-A Pawtucket Red Sox, where hit .200 with two home runs and 5 RBI in 10 games. Peralta never played in a Major League game for the Red Sox, and he was released on July 13.

== Skills profile ==
The metrics for Peralta's overall career defense show him as an average shortstop. However, his numbers have improved to the point where he was once a below-average shortstop to being a well above-average defender.

== Awards and accomplishments ==
- Set single-season franchise home run marks for shortstops for the Cleveland Indians (2005) and St. Louis Cardinals (2014)
- Cleveland Indians' Lou Boudreau Minor League Player of the Year Award (2004)
- International League Governors' Cup champion (2004)
- International League Most Valuable Player Award (2004)
- 3× Major League Baseball All Star (2011, 2013, 2015)
- The Sporting News National League All-Star at shortstop (2014)
- Buffalo Baseball Hall of Fame Inductee (2022)

== Personal life ==
Peralta is married to Molly Peralta. The couple have three daughters; including, twins named Gabriela Rose and Laina Katherine.

=== Name spelling ===
While the spelling of his first name is unusual in the United States, Peralta stated many people use that spelling in the Dominican Republic. He also told the Santo Domingo Times that his spelling is right and every "Johnny" or "Johnnie" in the world is wrong.

== See also ==
- List of Major League Baseball career putouts as a shortstop leaders
- List of Major League Baseball players from the Dominican Republic
- List of Major League Baseball players suspended for performance-enhancing drugs
