= Frank Dillon =

American baseball player and manager (1873–1931)

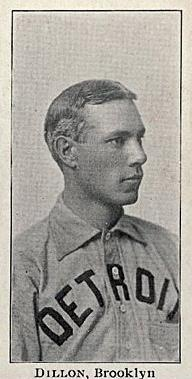
- First baseman
- Born: October 17, 1873; Normal, Illinois, U.S.
- Died: September 12, 1931 (aged 57); Pasadena, California, U.S.
- Batted: Left Threw: Right

MLB debut
- September 8, 1899, for the Pittsburgh Pirates

Last MLB appearance
- October 8, 1904, for the Brooklyn Superbas

MLB statistics
- Batting average: .252
- Home runs: 1
- Runs batted in: 116
- Stats at Baseball Reference

Teams
- Pittsburgh Pirates (1899–1900); Detroit Tigers (1901–1902); Baltimore Orioles (1902); Brooklyn Superbas (1904)

Frank Edward Dillon (October 17, 1873 – September 12, 1931), known in later years as Pop Dillon, was an American baseball player and manager. He played 22 seasons in professional baseball from 1894 to 1915, including five years in Major League Baseball, as a first baseman with the Pittsburgh Pirates (1899–1900), Detroit Tigers (1901–1902), Baltimore Orioles (1902), and Brooklyn Superbas (1904). He appeared in 312 major league games and compiled a .252 batting average. He was later a player and manager for the Los Angeles Angels of the Pacific Coast League (PCL) from 1903 to 1915. He led the Angels to PCL pennants in 1903, 1905, 1907 and 1908.

== Early years ==
Dillon was born in 1873 in Normal, Illinois. His father, Levi Dillon, owned a business breeding and selling Percheron horses. Dillon attended the University of Wisconsin and played for the Wisconsin Badgers baseball team from 1892 to 1894. Dillon was a cousin of Hall of Famer Clark Griffith.

== Professional baseball ==
=== Minor leagues ===
In 1894, Dillon figuratively worked both sides of the temperance movement by playing professional baseball for both the Peoria Distillers and the Des Moines Prohibitionists of the Western Association. Over the next four years, he played for Ottumwa in the Eastern Iowa League, Bloomington in the Western Interstate League, Dubuque, Rockford and Rock Island in the Western Association, Scranton in the Atlantic League, and Buffalo in the Western League.

=== Pittsburgh Pirates ===
In 1899, Dillon made his major league debut with the Pittsburgh Pirates. He appeared in 30 games as a first baseman for the 1899 Pirates and compiled a .256 batting average in 121 at bats. He returned to the Pirates in 1900, but appeared in only five games.

=== Detroit Tigers ===
In 1900, Dillon was sold by Buffalo to the Detroit Tigers of the American League, at that time still a minor league. Dillon appeared in 123 games for the 1900 Tigers and compiled a .291 batting average.

In 1901, Dillon played first base for the Tigers during their first season as a major league club. On April 25, 1901, he hit a major league record four doubles in the Tigers' first major league game. He hit two of his doubles in a 10-run rally in the ninth inning to give the Tigers a 14–13 victory over Milwaukee at Bennett Park. He compiled a .288 batting average in 281 at bats with the 1901 Tigers.

In March 1902, Dillon failed to report for spring training with the Tigers, and a story circulated that he had been hospitalized with appendicitis. The Detroit Free Press reported on March 12 that the story about the appendicitis was a canard and that Dillon was feeling well at his home in Normal, Illinois. He rejoined the Tigers and appeared in 66 games for the club during the 1902, though his batting average dropped 80 points to .206. He was turned over to the Baltimore Orioles during the 1902 season and appeared in two games with that club.

=== Los Angeles Angels ===
In August 1902, Dillon jumped to the Los Angeles Angels in the California League. He led the California League in 1902 with a .338 batting average in 318 at bats.

In October 1902, Dillon was hired to be player-manager in 1903 for the newly reorganized Los Angeles Angels of the Pacific Coast League (PCL). In 1903, Dillon led the Angels to the PCL pennant with a 133–78 record and ranked third in the league in batting with a .360 batting average.

=== Brooklyn Superbas ===
After leading Los Angeles to the PCL pennant, Dillon signed in December 1903 to play in 1904 with the Brooklyn Superbas of the National League. In January 1904, Dillon attempted to renege on his Brooklyn contract to remain in Los Angeles. However, an arbitration award in March 1904 awarded him to Brooklyn for the 1904 season. Dillon appeared in 135 game as Brooklyn's first baseman in 1904, compiling a .258 batting average and a .313 on-base percentage.

=== Return to Los Angeles ===
In March 1905, the Los Angeles club paid $1,700 to Brooklyn for the return of Dillon. The sum paid by Los Angeles was reported to be "the biggest price ever paid by a minor league club for the purchase of a big league player." Dillon helped lead the 1905 Los Angeles club to the PCL pennant. He compiled a .271 batting average in a career high 216 games and 778 at bats during the 1905 season.

Dillon remained with the Angels where he served as the player-manager through the 1915 season. He helped lead the Angels to pennants in 1903, 1905, 1907, and 1908. He was released by the Angels at age 42 in late November 1915.

== Later years ==
After his playing and managing days he was the treasurer of the Association of Professional Ball Players of America. He also operated an apple orchard in Yucaipa, California, and a company that sold 12,000 apple pies per year.

Dillon died in Pasadena, California, at age 57 in 1931.

He was later inducted posthumously into the Pacific Coast League Hall of Fame in 1943, in its inaugural election.
