= Albert Shaw (footballer) =

English footballer

Personal information
- Position: Winger

Senior career*
Years	Team	Apps	(Gls)
1923–1924	Chilton Colliery Recreation Athletic		
1924	Grimsby Town	5	(0)
1924–192?	Chilton Colliery Recreation Athletic		
- * Club domestic league appearances and goals

Albert E. Shaw was an English professional footballer who played as a winger.
