= Alan Shaw (footballer) =

Australian rules footballer

Personal information
- Full name: Alan James Shaw
- Born: 17 November 1923
- Died: 14 August 2016 (aged 92); New South Wales
- Original team: Coburg Districts
- Height: 178 cm (5 ft 10 in)
- Weight: 76 kg (168 lb)
- Position: Rover

Playing career^{1}
Years	Club	Games (Goals)
1944–1945	Essendon	5 (0)
1946–1947	Brunswick (VFA)	37 (0)
- ^{1} Playing statistics correct to the end of 1947.

Alan James Shaw (17 November 1923 – 14 August 2016) was an Australian rules footballer who played with the Essendon Football Club in the Victorian Football League (VFL). Shaw also played for Brunswick in the Victorian Football Association (VFA).
