= James D. Burns =

American businessman (1865–1928)

James D. Burns sheriff campaign photo, 1904

James Dennis Burns (July 28, 1865 – January 2, 1928) was an American businessman, hotel operator, politician, and baseball team owner. He was elected sheriff of Wayne County, Michigan, and served a four-year term. He also served three times as a delegate from Michigan to the Democratic National Convention, in 1908, 1912, and 1916. He was also the first owner of the Detroit Tigers in Major League Baseball, owning the club during the inaugural 1901 season.

Burns was born in 1865 at Springwells, Michigan, a district that was later incorporated into the City of Detroit. He was the sixth of eight children born to Peter and Hanorah (O'Callaghan) Burns. His father operated a brickworks that supplied bricks to construct many of the important buildings in Detroit. After being educated in the public schools of Springwells and Detroit, he joined his brothers and father in the brickworks business. After his father died, he continued to operate the brickworks with his brothers.

As a teenager, Burns was a boxer and wrestler and won the state amateur championship as a middleweight in both events. He did not compete professionally, but he played an influential role in the careers of Tommy Ryan (welterweight champion, 1884–98; middleweight champion, 1898–1906) and Noah Brusso (heavyweight champion, 1906–08). Brusso fought under the name "Tommy Burns" in honor of his friend and sponsor.

Burns was married in 1894 to Katherine Walsh. They had two sons, James Anthony born 1899, and Francis Leo born 1905. James Anthony served in the Michigan Senate and on the Wayne County Board of Commissioners. Francis Leo became a priest and helped found Detroit Catholic Central High School.

On March 6, 1900, Burns purchased the Detroit Tigers in conjunction with George Stallings for $12,000. He led the team to major league status in 1901 as an inaugural member of the American League and served as the team's president. The team played its home games at Bennett Park except on Sundays, when Detroit's blue laws forbade the team from playing there; Burns Park in Springwells served as the Tigers' Sunday home ball park. The 1901 Tigers had a 74–61 win–loss record. Burns sold his interest in the team to Samuel F. Angus in 1902 for $20,000.

In April 1905, Burns was elected as the sheriff of Wayne County, Michigan. He was re-elected in November 1906. He was also a member of the Democratic Party and served as a delegate to the Democratic National Conventions in 1908, 1912 and 1916.

After his term as sheriff expired, Burns went into the hotel business, constructing the Burns Hotel on Cadillac Square in 1905. (The hotel was torn down in 1927.) He subsequently sold his interest in the Burns Hotel and purchased the Ste. Claire Hotel, a 140-room hotel that was the first "fireproof" hotel in downtown Detroit. He also started the "Burns and Campbell" bar on Michigan Avenue in Detroit and later owned the "Metropole Restaurant and Grill" on Griswold Street.

Burns was a member of the Benevolent and Protective Order of Elks and Loyal Order of Moose. He died in 1928 at Grace Hospital, Detroit.

Burns died in January 1928 at age 62 at Grace Hospital in Detroit.
