= Frederick Shaw (cricketer) =

Irish cricketer and British Army officer

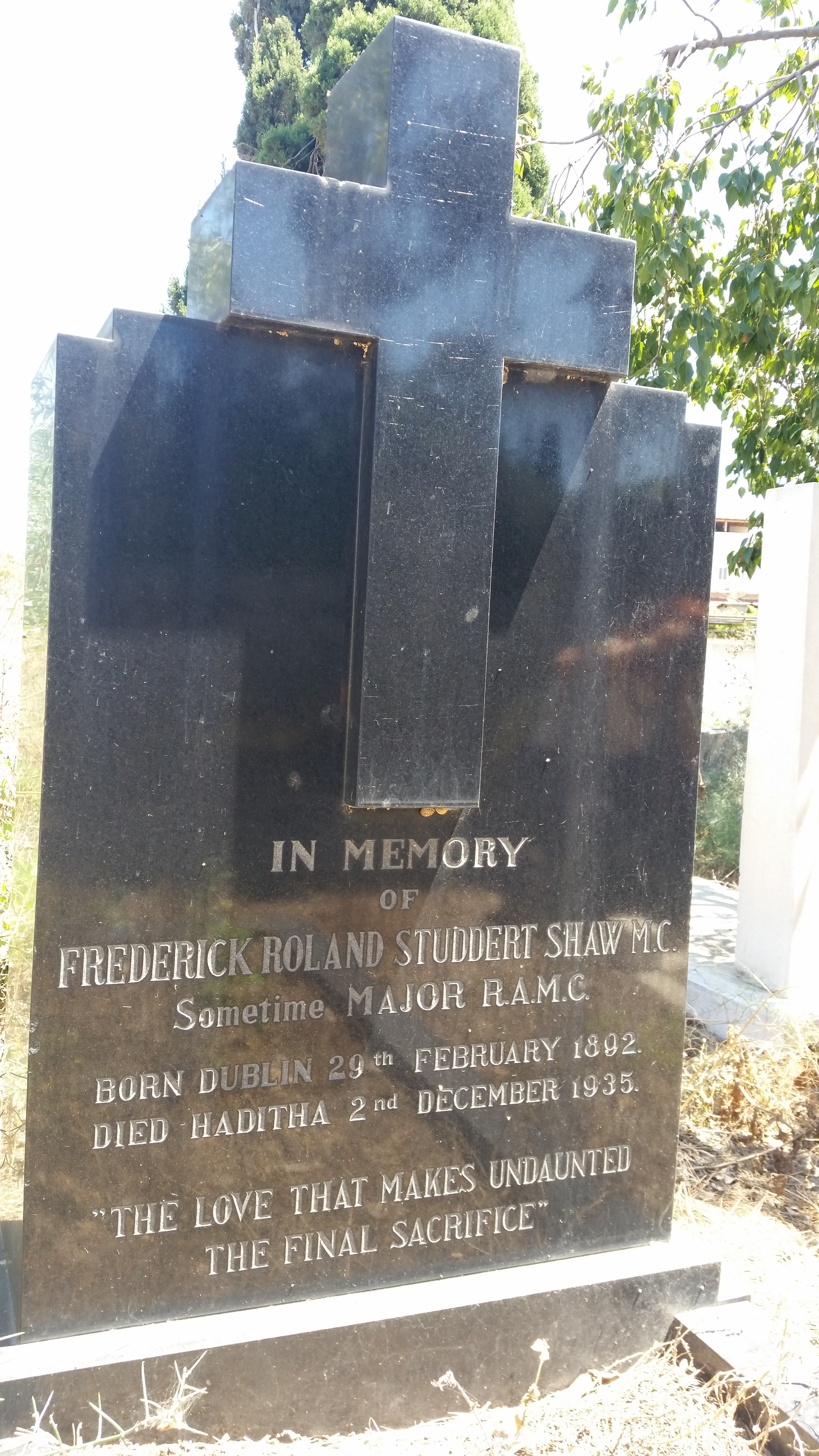
- Shaw's resting place at Haifa Cemetery

Personal information
- Full name: Frederick Roland Studdert Shaw
- Born: 29 February 1892; Dublin, Ireland
- Died: 2 December 1935 (aged 43); Haditha, Iraq
- Batting: Right-handed
- Bowling: Right-arm fast-medium

Domestic team information
- Years: Team
- 1913–1914: Ireland

Career statistics
Competition	First-class
Matches	7
Runs scored	193
Batting average	17.54
100s/50s	–/1
Top score	65
Balls bowled	782
Wickets	21
Bowling average	13.80
5 wickets in innings	2
10 wickets in match	1
Best bowling	7/30
Catches/stumpings	8/–
- Source: ESPNcricinfo, 5 November 2018

Frederick Roland Studdert Shaw MC (29 February 1892 – 2 December 1935) was an Irish first-class cricketer and British Army officer.

Shaw was born at Dublin in February 1892, and was educated in England at Archbishop Holgate's School. After completing his education in England, he returned to Dublin in 1909 to study medicine at Trinity College. Playing club cricket for Dublin University Cricket Club, Shaw made his debut in first-class cricket for Ireland against Scotland at Edinburgh in 1912. He played in the same fixture at Dublin in 1914, scoring 65 in Ireland's first-innings.

He graduated from Trinity College in 1914, serving in World War I with the British Army. He enlisted with the Royal Army Medical Corps in August 1914, with the rank of lieutenant (on probation), gaining the rank permanently in August of the following year. He was promoted to captain in January 1916. Shaw was awarded the Military Cross in January 1917. At wars end, he held the rank of acting major, but relinquished this rank in June 1919, whereby he retained the rank of captain.

Following the war, he continued to serve in the British Army. He was posted to British India after the war, where he played first-class cricket for the Europeans in the 1922–23 Lahore Tournament, playing two matches against the Hindus and the Muslims at Lahore. While stationed in British India, he commanded a motor ambulance convoy in North-West Frontier Province, assisted in dealing with a cholera epidemic in Waziristan, and was on the staff of the Director of Medical Services in India. With the Irish Free State having been formed in 1922, Shaw's continuing service in the British Army saw him return to the United Kingdom. He played three first-class matches for the British Army cricket team, one against the Royal Navy at Lord's in 1923, and two in 1925 against Oxford University and Cambridge University. Playing a total of seven first-class matches, Shaw scored 193 runs at an average of 17.54, with a highest score of 65. As a fast-medium bowler, Shaw took 21 wickets a bowling average of 13.80. Over half of his wickets came in the final of the Lahore Tournament against the Muslims, where bowling alongside Wilfred Rhodes he took 7/30 in the Muslims first-innings and 7/53 in their second-innings, finishing with match figures of 14/83. Shaw was later posted to Iraq sometime around 1925. During a Kurdish revolt in 1926, Shaw was instrumental in obtaining the release of two Royal Air Force officers that had been captured by forces loyal to Mahmud Barzanji.

He resigned his commission shortly thereafter, joining the Iraq Petroleum Company as their Chief Medical Officer in October 1927. He died in Iraq at the K3 Pipe Line Station near Haditha in December 1935. He is buried at the Haifa Cemetery in Israel. He was a cousin of the playwright George Bernard Shaw.
