= Burns Park (Detroit) =

Former baseball park in Detroit, Michigan

Coordinates: 42°18′57″N 83°6′59″W

Burns Park was a baseball park located in Springwells Township, near Detroit, Michigan. The stadium was the Sunday home of the Detroit Tigers in the American League starting in 1900, as baseball games were not permitted on Sundays within Detroit city limits. Recorded major league games were played at Burns Park in 1901 and 1902. The last ball game of any kind at Burns Park was played some time between 1902 and 1909 per one source, while local newspapers reported amateur games being played there as late as 1914.

== History ==
Burns Park was built in 1900, in response to blue laws, which prevented Sunday games from being played at Bennett Park, the team's primary home park. The park was west of the then-city limits of Detroit. The park was named for the Tigers' then-owner, James D. Burns, who built the ballpark on property that he owned.

No known maps of the area exist showing the park, and descriptions of the park's location are sometimes contradictory. However, contemporary sources help pin it down. The 1901 city directory gives the location as "southwest corner Toledo Avenue and Waterman Avenue". Later city directories call the ballpark "West End Park" and give the same location.

The April 25, 1900, Detroit Free Press report states that the new park is to be located "south of the stock yards, at the corner of Waterman and Dix Avenues". (Dix and Toledo, the latter since renamed Vernor Highway, both cross Waterman at the same point from different angles.) The article further states that the new ballpark is to have covered seating for 1,200 and open bleachers for about another 2,500. The only known references to the park are text; no photographs or diagrams of the park are known to exist.

Some sources place the ballpark adjacent to Livernois Street. However, contemporary newspaper writeups indicate taking the Baker or Sherman cars to Livernois, and then walking three blocks west to the ballpark at Waterman Avenue.

Maps of the general area indicate a rectangular block on that corner, bounded to the west by Beard Street and to the south by Stratton Street, resulting in a block that was (and still is) wider east-west than it is north-south.

In April of 1901 a strong wind blew the roof off the grandstand and onto the field. Given normal prevailing winds direction, that suggests the diamond was in the southwest portion of the property. This hypothesis is further supported by an analysis of the hitting at Burns Park which indicates a short left field, consistent with the shape of the block.

The American League of 1900 was a minor league, previously called the Western League. The first game at the park was held on May 6, 1900, with the Tigers losing to the Indianapolis Hoosiers 11–5. Besides the Tigers games, an International League game between the Chatham Reds and Port Huron Tunnelites occurred at Burns Park that year.

The American League declared itself a major league in 1901 and broke relations with the National League. On April 28, 1901, the first major league game was played at the ballpark in which the Tigers defeated the Milwaukee Brewers 12–11.

With peace between the leagues for 1903, the Tigers were advised to abandon Burns Park as being in an unsavory part of town, by which time Burns had sold the club anyway, so Burns Park ceased being a host to professional baseball.

The last attested official Tigers game at Burns Park was played on September 7, 1902, with an 11–6 win over the Baltimore Orioles, though the team played an exhibition game at the end of September. In subsequent years, the Tigers played a handful of Sunday "home" games in other cities, until the city of Detroit relaxed their blue laws to permit Sunday games at Bennett Park in 1907.
