= Samuel F. Angus =

American baseball executive (1855–1908)

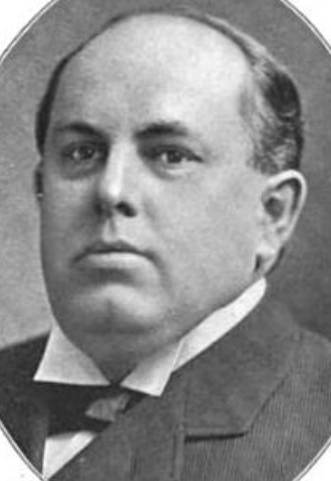
- Born: Samuel Floyd Angus; April 1855; Prairie Depot, Wood County, Ohio, U.S.
- Died: February 6, 1908 (aged 52); Detroit, Michigan, U.S.
- Occupation: businessman
- Known for: Owner of the Detroit Tigers (Nov. 1901–Oct. 1903), railway owner/executive
- Spouse: Dorothy Hood (died 1907)

Samuel Floyd Angus (April 1855 – February 6, 1908) was an American business owner and professional sports team owner. He was the principal owner of the Detroit Tigers of the American League from November 1901 through October 1903.

Angus began his career as a book agent in Ohio. He subsequently entered the life insurance business, first as an agent and later as a regional manager for large life insurance interests. In the late 1890s, he became a promoter and builder of interurban electric railways, including the 61-mile Toledo, Fremont & Norwalk Railway (later part of the Lake Shore Electric Railway) and the 79-mile Detroit, Ypsilanti, Ann Arbor & Jackson Railway (sometimes known as the "Ypsi-Ann").

In November 1901, he led a syndicate that acquired the Detroit Tigers from James D. Burns and George Stallings. He purchased majority interest in 1902 and owned the team until late 1903. During Angus's ownership, the team began the tradition of training in the south and acquired stars "Wild Bill" Donovan and "Wahoo Sam" Crawford, whose services would be key to the 1907 American League championship team.

== Early years ==
Angus was born in 1855 at Prairie Depot (now known as Wayne) in Wood County, Ohio, near Toledo. He was the son of Richard and Lillie (Atkinson) Angus. He began his career as a book agent, traveling through Ohio. Angus later credited his work as a book agent with his development as a businessman:

"I think that this experience developed all the business tact I have. It was a hard road to travel and necessitated close study of human nature. I learned to read men's faces, to know their moods, and to judge their character. It necessitated a great deal of reading as well, for I found the great way to draw men out and get them interested was to catch them by sounding their favorite style of books. I had to be generally well informed to talk intelligently, and I think the experience had much to do toward broadening my views of life generally."

In his work as a book agent, he was located variously in Toledo, Wheeling and Cleveland.

== Business career ==
While living in Cleveland, Angus became involved in the life insurance business. He moved to Detroit in 1892 or 1893 where he continued to work as a life insurance agent. He ultimately became regional manager for National Life Insurance Co. and then Home Life Insurance Co.

Angus also became involved in promoting and building electric railways in Ohio and Michigan. In 1899, Angus, along with partner Henry A. Haigh, built the Toledo, Fremont & Norwalk Railway with financial backing from the Comstock lumber family. The Toledo line was an interurban railway running 61 miles from Toledo to Fremont, Ohio, with Angus serving as the railway's first president. It later became part of the Lake Shore Electric Railway. In approximately 1898, Angus also promoted and built the Detroit, Ypsilanti, Ann Arbor & Jackson Railway (sometimes known as the "Ypsi-Ann"). The Ypsi-Ann allowed passengers to take interurban cars from Detroit to stops 79 miles west of the city, including Ypsilanti, Ann Arbor, Chelsea and Jackson. Angus and partner James D. Hawks also owned the Lansing City Electric Railway until August 1903.

== Detroit Tigers ==
On November 2, 1901, and with the support of American League president Ban Johnson, Angus took control of the finances of the Detroit Baseball Club by paying up a note given by owners James D. Burns and George Stallings for $13,600 secured by stock. This led later to a reorganization of the club, the retirement of both Burns and Stallings, and the control of the enterprise by a syndicate in which Angus, James McNamara, Frank C. Cook, E.H. Doyle and J. H. Fitzpatrick were prominent members. Toward the end of the 1902 season, on August 6, Angus purchased the holdings of his colleagues in the ownership syndicate and gained control of the club. The Sporting News noted that "Angus wants a winning club and will have no other." In 1902, the Reach Official American League Guide described Detroit's new owner:

"He is a portly and prosperous gentleman, a successful business man in many directions, but best known as president of the Detroit, Ypsilanti, Ann Arbor and Jackson Railway, a trolley line 76 miles in length, that is destined to reach Chicago."

As owner and president of the Tigers, Angus sought to acquire a number of stars to play for the team. He sought to negotiate a deal to bring Honus Wagner to Detroit, but the deal was "blocked within his own league." He was successful in acquiring "Wild Bill" Donovan and "Wahoo Sam" Crawford, whose work later helped the club win the American League pennant in 1907. During the 1903 season, Angus began the team's custom of training in the south. The club trained that year at Shreveport, Louisiana, with Ed Barrow as manager.

Frank Navin was a clerk who kept the books for Angus. Navin knew that Angus was "woefully under-financed from the outset" and "nearly out of money." Navin also knew Bill Yawkey, a wealthy 28-year-old lumber heir. At Navin's urging, Yawkey purchased the Tigers from Angus in October 1903 for $50,000 with Navin receiving a ten percent share of the club.

== Family and later years ==
Angus was married to Dorothy Hood of Milan, Ohio. They twin sons, both of whom died in infancy. Politically, he was a Republican. He was a 32nd degree Mason and a member of the Turtle Lake club, the New York Athletic Club, the Detroit Boat Club, the Lake St. Clair Shooting and Fishing Club, and the Ohio Society of New York. He enjoyed horses and driving as recreation and lived at 59 East Ferry Avenue in Detroit. In January 1907, Angus sold his railway interests and retired.

His wife died in California in early 1907, while she was "trying to regain her health." Angus also became seriously ill while in California. One newspaper described his condition as a "physical trouble that developed into paresis," a mental condition. Another newspaper account stated that he became "broken down physically and mentally." After an illness reportedly lasting three years, Angus died in Detroit in February 1908 at age 52.
