= Ed High =

American baseball player (1873–1926)

Edward Thomas High
- Pitcher
- Born: October 26, 1873; Baltimore, Maryland, U.S.
- Died: February 10, 1926 (aged 52); Baltimore, Maryland, U.S.
- Batted: Unknown Threw: Left

MLB debut
- July 4, 1901, for the Detroit Tigers

Last MLB appearance
- August 5, 1901, for the Detroit Tigers

MLB statistics
- Win–loss record: 1–0
- Earned run average: 3.50
- Strikeouts: 4
- Stats at Baseball Reference

Teams
- Detroit Tigers (1901)

Edward "Lefty" Thomas High (October 26, 1873 – February 10, 1926) was an American professional baseball player who played in four games for the Detroit Tigers during the 1901 season. He was born in Baltimore, Maryland, and died there at the age of 52.
