= Joe Yeager =

American baseball player (1875–1937)

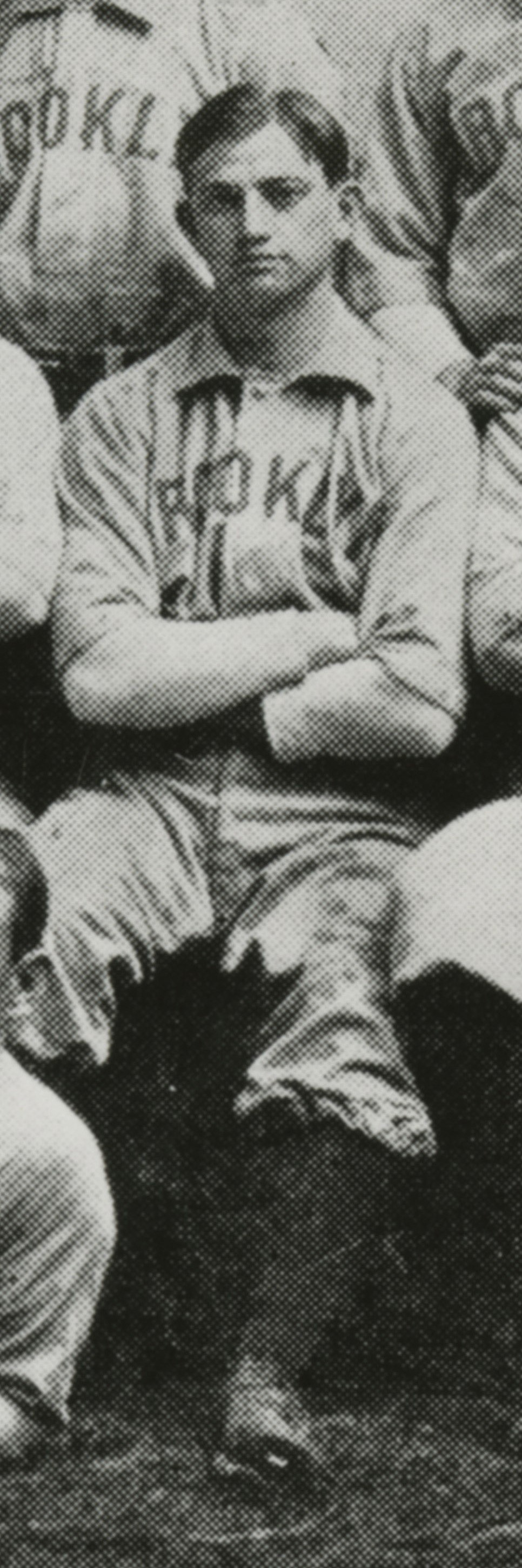
- Yeager in 1898
- Third baseman / Pitcher
- Born: August 28, 1875; Philadelphia, Pennsylvania, U.S.
- Died: June 29, 1937 (aged 61); Detroit, Michigan, U.S.
- Batted: Right Threw: Right

MLB debut
- April 22, 1898, for the Brooklyn Bridegrooms

Last MLB appearance
- September 29, 1908, for the St. Louis Browns

MLB statistics
- Batting average: .252
- Home runs: 4
- Runs batted in: 201
- Win–loss record: 33–49
- Earned run average: 3.74
- Strikeouts: 145
- Stats at Baseball Reference

Teams
- Brooklyn Bridegrooms/Superbas (1898–1900); Detroit Tigers (1901–1903); New York Highlanders (1905–1906); St. Louis Browns (1907–1908)

Joseph Francis Yeager (August 28, 1875 – June 29, 1937), nicknamed "Little Joe", was an American professional baseball infielder and pitcher. He played 10 seasons in Major League Baseball (MLB) for the Brooklyn Bridegrooms/Superbas, Detroit Tigers, New York Highlanders, and St. Louis Browns.

== Early years ==
Yeager was born in Philadelphia in 1875.

== Professional baseball ==
Yeager began playing professional baseball in the minor leagues, including two years with the Lancaster Maroons from 1896 to 1897. In 1897, he compiled a 26–11 win–loss record as a pitcher and had a .345 batting average.

In 1898, Yeager made his major league debut with the Brooklyn Bridegrooms. He had 32 complete games and a respectable earned run average but lost 22 games for a team that finished in 10th place.

Yeager played for the Detroit Tigers as a starting pitcher during their first major league season in 1901. He pitched 199.2 innings in 1901 with a 12–11 record, 22 complete games, and two shutouts. His 2.61 earned run average was third-best in the American League, and his adjusted ERA+ of 146 was second-best in the league behind Cy Young. Yeager also played 12 games at shortstop for the 1901 Tigers and had a .296 batting average, a .343 on-base percentage, and a .416 slugging percentage.

After a 6–12 season as a pitcher in 1902, Yeager made the switch from pitcher to third baseman. He was the Tigers' starting third baseman in 1903 and went on to play third base for the New York Highlanders and St. Louis Browns. His major league career ended in 1908, and afterwards, he continued to play in the minor leagues until 1915.

Yeager has been credited with originating the squeeze play.

== Family and later years ==
Yeager was married in approximately 1900 to Addie Ruby. He was employed by the City of Detroit for the last 18 years of his life. They lived in Detroit. Yeager became ill in June 1937 and died three weeks later at his home located at 8729 W. Vernor Highway in Detroit. He was 61 years old.
