= Frank Owen (baseball) =

American baseball player (1879–1942)

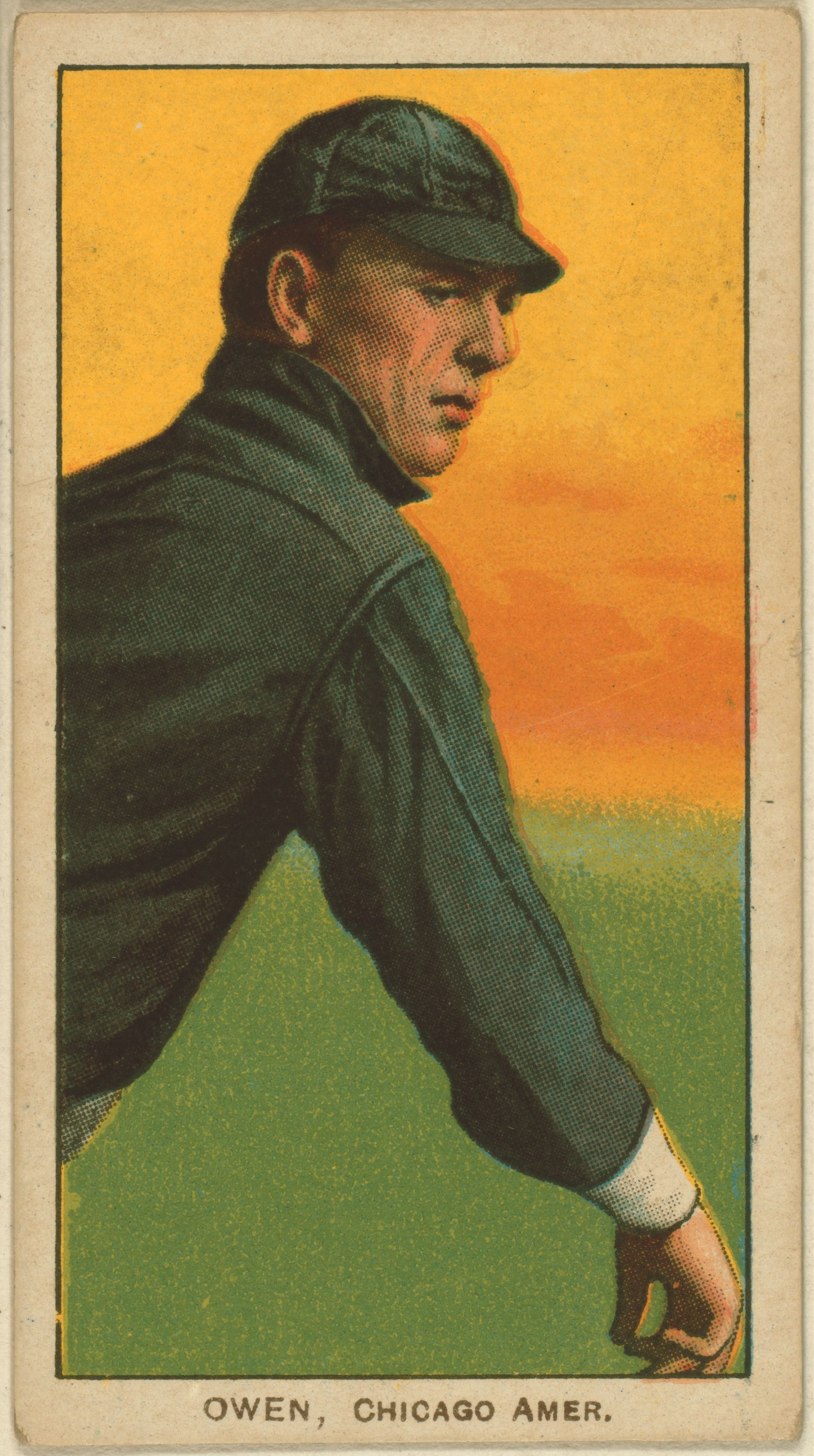
- Frank Owen baseball card
- Pitcher
- Born: December 23, 1879; Ypsilanti, Michigan, U.S.
- Died: November 24, 1942 (aged 62); Dearborn, Michigan, U.S.
- Batted: Switch Threw: Right

MLB debut
- April 29, 1901, for the Detroit Tigers

Last MLB appearance
- May 12, 1909, for the Chicago White Sox

MLB statistics
- Win–loss record: 82–67
- Earned run average: 2.55
- Strikeouts: 443
- Stats at Baseball Reference

Teams
- Detroit Tigers (1901); Chicago White Sox (1903–1909)

Career highlights and awards
- World Series champion (1906)

Frank Malcolm Owen (December 23, 1879 – November 24, 1942) was an American pitcher in Major League Baseball who played eight seasons with the Detroit Tigers and Chicago White Sox.

Born in Ypsilanti, Michigan (and nicknamed "Yip" for it), he pitched the final six innings of Game 2 of the 1906 World Series, replacing Doc White. In 194 career games, Owen had an 82–67 won-loss record with a 2.55 ERA.

Owen was the first American League pitcher to pitch complete game wins in both games of a doubleheader, winning against the St. Louis Browns on July 1, 1905. Owen was mistakenly referred to as "Billy Owen" in the 1906 version of the "Fan Craze" board game, released by the Fan Craze Co of Cincinnati.

In 1904, as a member of the White Sox, in 315 innings of work, he handled 151 chances (21 PO, 130 A) without an error and also executed 8 double plays.
