= Roscoe Miller =

American baseball player (1876–1913)

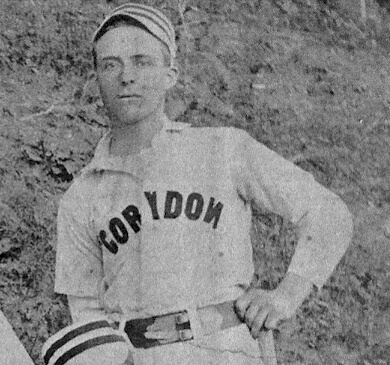
- Pitcher
- Born: December 2, 1876; Greenville, Indiana, U.S.
- Died: April 18, 1913 (aged 36); Corydon, Indiana, U.S.
- Batted: Right Threw: Right

MLB debut
- April 25, 1901, for the Detroit Tigers

Last MLB appearance
- July 30, 1904, for the Pittsburgh Pirates

MLB statistics
- Win–loss record: 39–45
- Earned run average: 3.45
- Strikeouts: 198
- Stats at Baseball Reference

Teams
- Detroit Tigers (1901–1902); New York Giants (1902–1903); Pittsburgh Pirates (1904)

Roscoe Clyde Miller (December 2, 1876 – April 18, 1913) was an American right-handed pitcher in Major League Baseball who played parts of four seasons (1901–1904) with the Detroit Tigers, New York Giants and Pittsburgh Pirates. For his career, he compiled a 39–45 record in 102 appearances, with a 3.45 earned run average and 198 strikeouts. His nicknames were "Roxy" and "Rubberlegs".

== Baseball career ==
Miller was born in 1876 in Greenville, Indiana. He started his professional baseball career in 1896.

in 1901, Miller started 36 games for the Detroit Tigers in their first season in the new American League, and finished with a record of 23–13. In 1901, he also had 35 complete games (still an American League rookie record), 3 shutouts, 79 strikeouts, and a 2.95 ERA–89 points below the league average.

Miller could not duplicate the success of his rookie season, losing 20 games in 1902, and never again having a winning record. Miller jumped mid-season in 1902 to the New York Giants to play for newly signed Giants' manager John McGraw. Miller was 1–8 for McGraw and the Giants in the last half of 1902 and pitched in 1915 games for New York in 1903. In 1904, he played for the Pittsburgh Pirates in his final major league season.

In 1904, Miller sprained his wrist in a carriage accident. He was riding with 14 Pirates players when the rear wheel suddenly collapsed. Several players, including Miller and Kitty Bransfield, were injured when the frightened horses bolted and dragged the carriage on its side.

After the 1904 season, Miller returned to the minor leagues. In 1906, he pitched for the Des Moines Champions of the Western League, where he led the circuit with a 28–15 record. His professional baseball career ended in 1909.

== Later years ==
In the spring of 1912, Miller traveled to Virginia to try out unsuccessfully for a minor league club. He did not make the club and was described at the time as "down and out, and penniless." He died of tuberculosis one year later at his home near Corydon, Indiana, at age 36.

== See also ==
- List of Major League Baseball annual saves leaders
