= Al Shaw (catcher) =

American baseball player (1873–1958)

- Catcher
- Born: May 22, 1873; Burslem, England
- Died: March 25, 1958 (aged 84); Uhrichsville, Ohio, U.S.
- Batted: Right Threw: Right

MLB debut
- June 10, 1901, for the Detroit Tigers

Last MLB appearance
- September 13, 1909, for the Boston Doves

MLB statistics
- Batting average: .200
- Home runs: 1
- Runs batted in: 32
- Stats at Baseball Reference

Teams
- Detroit Tigers (1901); Boston Americans (1907); Chicago White Sox (1908); Boston Doves (1909)

Alfred Louis Shaw (May 22, 1873 – March 25, 1958), nicknamed "Shoddy", was an American professional baseball catcher who played four seasons with the Detroit Tigers (1901), Boston Americans (1907), Chicago White Sox (1908), and Boston Doves (1909).

Shaw was born in Burslem in the English county of Staffordshire, and made his major league debut at age 28 with the Tigers. He hit .269 with a .321 on-base percentage in 55 games in 1901 with 20 runs and 23 RBIs for the Tigers. Shaw did not play again in the major leagues for six years, when he signed with the Boston Americans in 1907. In 76 games for Boston, Shaw hit only .192. His batting average continued to decline in 1908 (.082) and 1909 (.098), and he played his last major league game for the Doves on September 13, 1909.

In March 1958, Shaw died in Uhrichsville, Ohio, at age 84.
