= Bennett Park (Detroit) =

Former baseball stadium in Detroit

Coordinates: 42°19′56″N 83°4′5″W

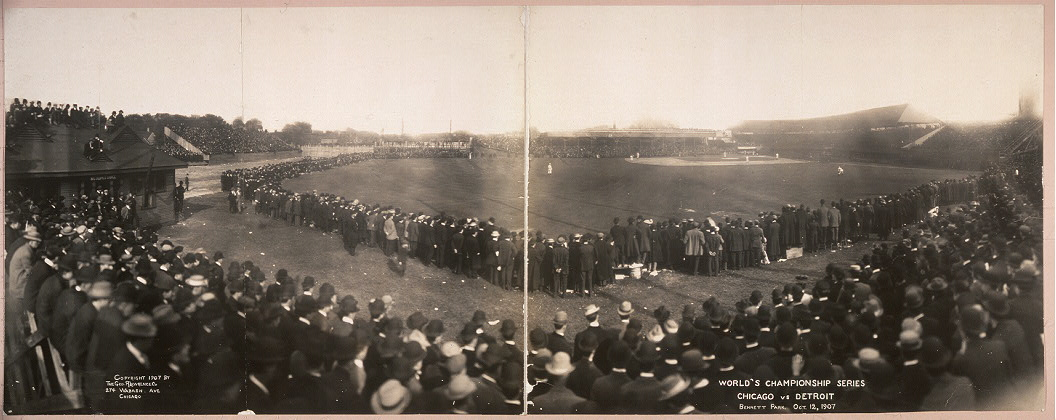
- Bennett Park on October 12, 1907, in a World Series game between the Detroit Tigers and Chicago Cubs, Detroit, Michigan
- Interactive map of Bennett Park
- Location: Detroit
- Capacity: 5,000 (1896); 14,000 (by 1911)

Construction
- Opened: April 28, 1896
- Closed: 1911
- Demolished: 1911 to build Navin Field

Tenant
- Detroit Tigers (MLB) (1896–1911)

Bennett Park was a baseball stadium in Detroit. Located at Michigan and Trumbull Avenues, it was home to the Detroit Tigers and was named after Charlie Bennett, a former player whose career ended after a train accident in 1894.

The Tigers began play at Bennett Park in the minor Western League with a 17–2 win over the Columbus Senators on April 28, 1896. That league was renamed the American League in 1900, and the AL declared itself a major league starting in 1901.

== History ==
Bennett Park outline in 1897

Bennett Field was built on land once owned by William Woodbridge who farmed after retirement from public office. Later the land was a hay market, dog pound, and public picnic park. Tigers owner George Arthur Vanderbeck acquired the property before 1896.

When it opened in 1896, the stadium held 5,000 spectators, the smallest capacity in the major leagues. It had gradually expanded to 14,000 seats by the time it was closed after the 1911 season. Private parties built "bootleg bleachers" on the rooftops of houses behind the left field fence, to the chagrin of Tiger ownership, since people paid to watch games from those bleachers but the Tigers did not get revenue.

The field was noted for its dangerous playing surface, with cobblestones beneath the dirt and sometimes protruding over the dirt.

The Tigers and a young Ty Cobb won three consecutive pennants in the stadium between 1907–1909. Their success ran out in the post-season on each occasion, when they lost to stronger National League teams in the World Series. In both 1907 and 1908, the Cubs clinched their first two World Series championships (and their last one for over a century, until 2016).

Between the 1911 and 1912 seasons, the Tigers acquired the rest of the block, demolished both the bootleg bleachers and Bennett Park, and built Navin Field on the same site. The new stadium was shifted by 90°, with home plate where the left field corner had formerly been.

=== First night game ===
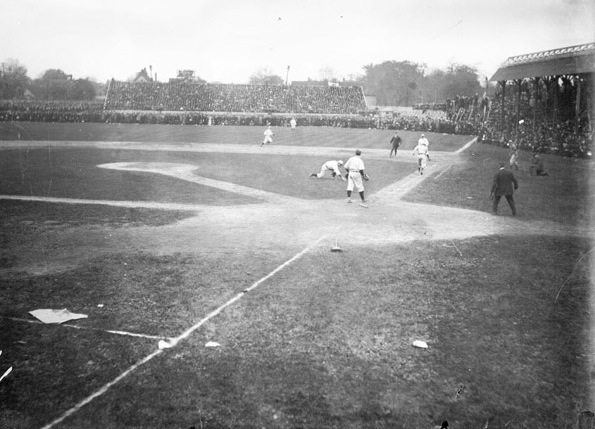
Bennett Park during the 1907 World Series

Bennett Park was home to the first nighttime baseball game in Detroit. On September 24, 1896, the Tigers played their last game of their first season at Bennett Park, an exhibition doubleheader against the Cincinnati Reds. Tigers owner George Arthur Vanderbeck had workers string lights above the stadium for the nighttime game. A crowd of 1200 attended the experiment, which was described by a local newspaper as "an amusing and financial success".

Nighttime baseball did not return to Detroit until June 15, 1948, when the first game under the lights was played at Briggs Stadium.

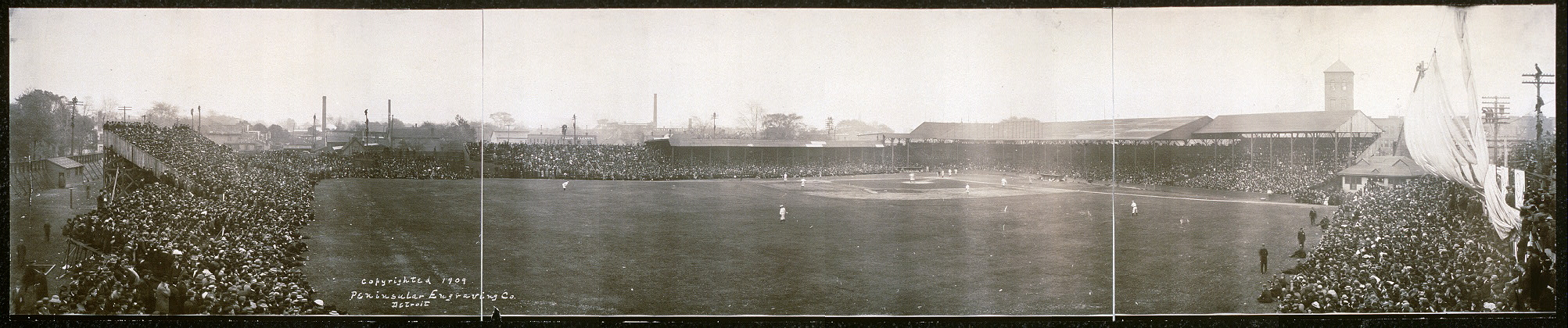
World Series baseball game at Bennett Park on October 11, 1909.

Preceded by Boulevard Park	Home of the Detroit Tigers; 1896–1911	Succeeded by Tiger Stadium
