= 1902 Philadelphia Phillies season =

National League season

1902 Philadelphia Phillies
- League: National League
- Ballpark: National League Park
- City: Philadelphia
- Owners: Al Reach, John Rogers
- Managers: Bill Shettsline

The 1902 Philadelphia Phillies season was a season in American baseball. The team finished seventh in the National League with a record of 56–81, 46 games behind the Pittsburgh Pirates.

== Offseason ==
- October 19, 1901: Ed Delahanty jumped from the Phillies to the Washington Senators.

== Preseason ==
The Phillies held spring training in 1902 in Washington, North Carolina where the team practiced and played exhibition games at the city's race track inside the inclosure. The team journeyed from Philadelphia to Norfolk by boat on the steamer Yemassee, departing the Arch Street wharf on March 22, 1902. From Norfolk the team took the train to Washington. The Phillies made their headquarters at the Hotel Nicholson on Main Street. It was the only season the Phillies trained in Washington.

== Regular season ==
In 1902, the Phillies obtained an injunction, effective only in Pennsylvania, barring Nap Lajoie from playing baseball for any team other than the Phillies. The American League responded by transferring Lajoie's contract to the Cleveland Indians, then known as the Bronchos and subsequently renamed the "Naps" in Lajoie's honor for several seasons.

=== Season standings ===
National League
Team	W	L	Pct.	GB	Home	Road
Pittsburgh Pirates	103	36	.741	—	56‍–‍15	47‍–‍21
Brooklyn Superbas	75	63	.543	27½	45‍–‍23	30‍–‍40
Boston Beaneaters	73	64	.533	29	42‍–‍27	31‍–‍37
Cincinnati Reds	70	70	.500	33½	35‍–‍35	35‍–‍35
Chicago Orphans	68	69	.496	34	31‍–‍38	37‍–‍31
St. Louis Cardinals	56	78	.418	44½	28‍–‍38	28‍–‍40
Philadelphia Phillies	56	81	.409	46	29‍–‍39	27‍–‍42
New York Giants	48	88	.353	53½	24‍–‍44	24‍–‍44

=== Record vs. opponents ===
1902 National League record Sources:
Team	BSN	BRO	CHC	CIN	NYG	PHI	PIT	STL
Boston	—	8–12	11–9	11–9	16–3	11–9–1	6–14–1	10–8–3
Brooklyn	12–8	—	12–8	12–8	10–10	13–6	6–14–1	10–9–2
Chicago	9–11	8–12	—	12–8–1	10–10–4	10–10	7–13	12–5–1
Cincinnati	9–11	8–12	8–12–1	—	14–6	13–7	5–15	13–7
New York	3–16	10–10	10–10–4	6–14	—	6–12	6–13–1	7–13
Philadelphia	9–11–1	6–13	10–10	7–13	12–6	—	2–18	10–10
Pittsburgh	14–6–1	14–6–1	13–7	15–5	13–6–1	18–2	—	16–4
St. Louis	8–10–3	9–10–2	5–12–1	7–13	13–7	10–10	4–16	—

=== Roster ===
1902 Philadelphia Phillies
Roster
Pitchers: Bill Duggleby; Harry Felix; Henry Fox; Chick Fraser; Ham Iburg; Bill Magee; Barney McFadden; Solly Salisbury; Cy Vorhees; Doc White; Jesse Whiting; Bill Wolff	Catchers: Joe Berry; Red Dooin; Fred Jacklitsch; Nap Shea; Infielders: Pete Childs; Klondike Douglass; Paddy Greene; Bill Hallman; Rudy Hulswitt; Hughie Jennings; Harry Wolverton	Outfielders: Shad Barry; George Browne; Bill Clay; Tom Fleming; Henry Krug; Frank Mahar; Tom Maher; Bill Thomas; Roy Thomas; Ed Watkins	Manager: Bill Shettsline

== Player stats ==
=== Batting ===
==== Starters by position ====
Note: Pos = Position; G = Games played; AB = At bats; H = Hits; Avg. = Batting average; HR = Home runs; RBI = Runs batted in

Pos	Player	G	AB	H	Avg.	HR	RBI
C	Red Dooin	94	333	77	.231	0	35
1B	Klondike Douglass	109	408	95	.233	0	37
2B	Pete Childs	123	403	78	.194	0	25
SS	Rudy Hulswitt	128	497	135	.272	0	38
3B	Bill Hallman	73	254	63	.248	0	35
OF	Roy Thomas	138	500	143	.286	0	24
OF	Shad Barry	138	543	156	.287	3	58
OF	George Browne	70	281	73	.260	0	26

==== Other batters ====
Note: G = Games played; AB = At bats; H = Hits; Avg. = Batting average; HR = Home runs; RBI = Runs batted in

Player	G	AB	H	Avg.	HR	RBI
Hughie Jennings	78	290	79	.272	1	32
Henry Krug	53	198	45	.227	0	14
Harry Wolverton	34	136	40	.294	0	16
Fred Jacklitsch	38	114	23	.202	0	8
Paddy Greene	19	65	11	.169	0	1
Harry Felix	16	37	5	.135	0	2
Bill Thomas	6	17	2	.118	0	0
Tom Fleming	5	16	6	.375	0	2
Nap Shea	3	8	1	.125	0	0
Bill Clay	3	8	2	.250	0	1
Joe Berry	1	4	1	.250	0	1
Ed Watkins	1	3	0	.000	0	0
Tom Maher	2	1	0	.000	0	0
Frank Mahar	1	0	0	----	0	0

=== Pitching ===
==== Starting pitchers ====
Note: G = Games pitched; IP = Innings pitched; W = Wins; L = Losses; ERA = Earned run average; SO = Strikeouts

Player	G	IP	W	L	ERA	SO
Doc White	36	306.0	16	20	2.53	185
Bill Duggleby	33	258.2	11	17	3.38	60
Ham Iburg	30	236.0	11	18	3.89	106
Chick Fraser	27	224.0	12	13	3.42	97
Bill Magee	8	53.2	2	4	3.69	15
Jesse Whiting	1	9.0	0	1	5.00	0
Barney McFadden	1	9.0	0	1	8.00	3
Bill Wolff	1	9.0	0	1	4.00	3

==== Other pitchers ====
Note: G = Games pitched; IP = Innings pitched; W = Wins; L = Losses; ERA = Earned run average; SO = Strikeouts

Player	G	IP	W	L	ERA	SO
Cy Vorhees	10	53.2	3	3	3.86	24
Harry Felix	9	45.0	1	3	5.60	10
Solly Salisbury	2	6.0	0	0	13.50	0

==== Relief pitchers ====
Note: G = Games pitched; W = Wins; L = Losses; SV = Saves; ERA = Earned run average; SO = Strikeouts

Player	G	W	L	SV	ERA	SO
Jacob Fox	1	0	0	1	18.00	1
