= 1902 Boston Beaneaters season =

1902 Boston Beaneaters
- League: National League
- Ballpark: South End Grounds
- City: Boston, Massachusetts
- Record: 73–64 (.533)
- League place: 3rd
- Owners: Arthur Soden
- Managers: Al Buckenberger

The 1902 Boston Beaneaters season was the 32nd season of the franchise.

== Regular season ==
=== Season standings ===
National League
Team	W	L	Pct.	GB	Home	Road
Pittsburgh Pirates	103	36	.741	—	56‍–‍15	47‍–‍21
Brooklyn Superbas	75	63	.543	27½	45‍–‍23	30‍–‍40
Boston Beaneaters	73	64	.533	29	42‍–‍27	31‍–‍37
Cincinnati Reds	70	70	.500	33½	35‍–‍35	35‍–‍35
Chicago Orphans	68	69	.496	34	31‍–‍38	37‍–‍31
St. Louis Cardinals	56	78	.418	44½	28‍–‍38	28‍–‍40
Philadelphia Phillies	56	81	.409	46	29‍–‍39	27‍–‍42
New York Giants	48	88	.353	53½	24‍–‍44	24‍–‍44

=== Record vs. opponents ===
1902 National League record Sources:
Team	BSN	BRO	CHC	CIN	NYG	PHI	PIT	STL
Boston	—	8–12	11–9	11–9	16–3	11–9–1	6–14–1	10–8–3
Brooklyn	12–8	—	12–8	12–8	10–10	13–6	6–14–1	10–9–2
Chicago	9–11	8–12	—	12–8–1	10–10–4	10–10	7–13	12–5–1
Cincinnati	9–11	8–12	8–12–1	—	14–6	13–7	5–15	13–7
New York	3–16	10–10	10–10–4	6–14	—	6–12	6–13–1	7–13
Philadelphia	9–11–1	6–13	10–10	7–13	12–6	—	2–18	10–10
Pittsburgh	14–6–1	14–6–1	13–7	15–5	13–6–1	18–2	—	16–4
St. Louis	8–10–3	9–10–2	5–12–1	7–13	13–7	10–10	4–16	—

=== Roster ===
1902 Boston Beaneaters
Roster
Pitchers: Sammy Curran; Bob Dresser; Mal Eason; Dad Hale; Fred Klobedanz; Red Long; John Malarkey; Togie Pittinger; Vic Willis	Catchers: Malachi Kittridge; Pat Moran; Infielders: Gene DeMontreville; Charlie Dexter; Ed Gremminger; Herman Long; Fred Tenney	Outfielders: Fred Brown; Pat Carney; Duff Cooley; Ernie Courtney; Billy Lush	Manager: Al Buckenberger

== Player stats ==
=== Batting ===
==== Starters by position ====
Note: Pos = Position; G = Games played; AB = At bats; H = Hits; Avg. = Batting average; HR = Home runs; RBI = Runs batted in

Pos	Player	G	AB	H	Avg.	HR	RBI
C	Malachi Kittridge	80	255	60	.235	2	30
1B	Fred Tenney	134	489	154	.315	2	30
2B	Gene DeMontreville	124	481	125	.260	0	53
SS	Herman Long	120	439	101	.230	2	44
3B	Ed Gremminger	140	522	134	.257	1	65
OF	Pat Carney	137	522	141	.270	2	65
OF	Billy Lush	120	413	92	.223	2	19
OF	Duff Cooley	135	548	162	.296	0	58

==== Other batters ====
Note: G = Games played; AB = At bats; H = Hits; Avg. = Batting average; HR = Home runs; RBI = Runs batted in

Player	G	AB	H	Avg.	HR	RBI
Pat Moran	80	251	60	.239	1	24
Charlie Dexter	48	183	47	.257	1	18
Ernie Courtney	48	165	36	.218	0	17
Fred Brown	2	6	2	.333	0	0

=== Pitching ===
==== Starting pitchers ====
Note: G = Games pitched; IP = Innings pitched; W = Wins; L = Losses; ERA = Earned run average; SO = Strikeouts

Player	G	IP	W	L	ERA	SO
Vic Willis	51	410.0	27	20	2.20	225
Togie Pittinger	46	389.1	27	16	2.52	174
Mal Eason	27	206.1	9	11	2.75	50
John Malarkey	21	170.1	8	10	2.59	39
Bob Dresser	1	9.0	0	1	3.00	8
Fred Klobedanz	1	8.0	1	0	1.13	4
Red Long	1	8.0	0	0	1.13	5

==== Other pitchers ====
Note: G = Games pitched; IP = Innings pitched; W = Wins; L = Losses; ERA = Earned run average; SO = Strikeouts

Player	G	IP	W	L	ERA	SO
Dad Hale	8	40.0	1	3	6.08	11
Pat Carney	2	5.0	0	1	9.00	3

==== Relief pitchers ====
Note: G = Games pitched; W = Wins; L = Losses; SV = Saves; ERA = Earned run average; SO = Strikeouts

Player	G	W	L	SV	ERA	SO
Sammy Curran	1	0	0	0	1.35	3
