= Philadelphia Phillies all-time roster (W–Z) =

List of baseball players

Philadelphia Baseball Wall of Fame member Cy Williams was a three-time National League home run champion while playing for the Phillies from 1918 to 1930.

The Philadelphia Phillies are a Major League Baseball team based in Philadelphia, Pennsylvania. They are a member of the Eastern Division of Major League Baseball's National League. The team has played officially under two names since beginning play between 1882 and 1883: the current moniker, as well as the "Quakers", which was used in conjunction with "Phillies" during the team's early history. The team was also known unofficially as the "Blue Jays" during the World War II era. Since the franchise's inception, 2,081 players have made an appearance in a competitive game for the team, whether as an offensive player (batting and baserunning) or a defensive player (fielding, pitching, or both).

Of those 2,081 Phillies, 114 have had surnames beginning with the letter W, 8 beginning with the letter Y, and 7 beginning with the letter Z; there has never been a Phillies player, nor a player in Major League Baseball history, whose surname begins with the letter X. Three have been inducted into the Baseball Hall of Fame: pitcher Billy Wagner who played for the Phillies in 2004 and 2005; center fielder Lloyd Waner, who was a Phillie during the 1942 season; and left fielder Hack Wilson, who played for Philadelphia in 1934. One member of this list has been elected to the Philadelphia Baseball Wall of Fame; center fielder Cy Williams played 13 seasons for the Phillies, leading the National League in home runs three times in that span.

Among the 70 batters in this list, catcher Matt Walbeck has the highest batting average, at 1.000; he notched a hit in his only at-bat with Philadelphia. Other players with an average above .300 include Charlie Waitt (.333 in one season), Curt Walker (.311 in four seasons), Harry Walker (.339 in two seasons), Phil Weintraub (.311 in one season), Pinky Whitney (.307 in ten seasons), and Williams (.306). Williams also leads this list in home runs, with 217, and runs batted in (RBI), with 795. Among the players whose surnames start with Y and Z, Charlie Yingling (.250) and Charlie Ziegler (.273) have the highest averages; Del Young and Todd Zeile lead their respective lists in home runs and RBI.

Of this list's 59 pitchers, four share the best win–loss record, in terms of winning percentage; Fred Wenz won two games and lost none in his Phillies career, while Bob Wells, Deke White, and Mike Zagurski each earned a win in their only decisions. Rick Wise leads all members of this list in victories (75) and defeats (76), and is one of ten Phillies pitchers to throw a no-hitter, accomplishing the feat on June 23, 1971. Randy Wolf leads in strikeouts, having thrown 971 in his eight-season Phillies career. The earned run average (ERA) leaders are Huck Wallace and Dan Warthen; each amassed a 0.00 ERA by allowing no earned runs in their Phillies careers. One position player, right fielder Glenn Wilson, also sports a 0.00 ERA after his only pitching appearance with Philadelphia. Among players who have allowed runs, Billy Wagner's 1.86 ERA is best. Leaders among the Y- and Z-named pitchers include Floyd Youmans (1 win, 5.70 ERA, 20 strikeouts), Zagurski (36 strikeouts), and Tom Zachary (4.26 ERA).

One player, Bucky Walters, has made 30% or more of his Phillies appearances as a pitcher and a position player. He amassed a 38–53 pitching record with a 4.48 ERA while batting .260 with seven home runs as a third baseman.

Key to symbols in player list(s)
† or ‡	Indicates a member of the National Baseball Hall of Fame and Museum; ‡ indicates that the Phillies are the player's primary team^{[H]}
§	Indicates a member of the Philadelphia Baseball Wall of Fame
*	Indicates a team record^{[R]}
(#)	A number following a player's name indicates that the number was retired by the Phillies in the player's honor.
Year	Italic text indicates that the player is a member of the Phillies' active (25-man) roster.
Position(s)	Indicates the player's primary position(s)^{[P]}
Notes	Statistics shown only for playing time with Phillies^{[S]}
Ref	References

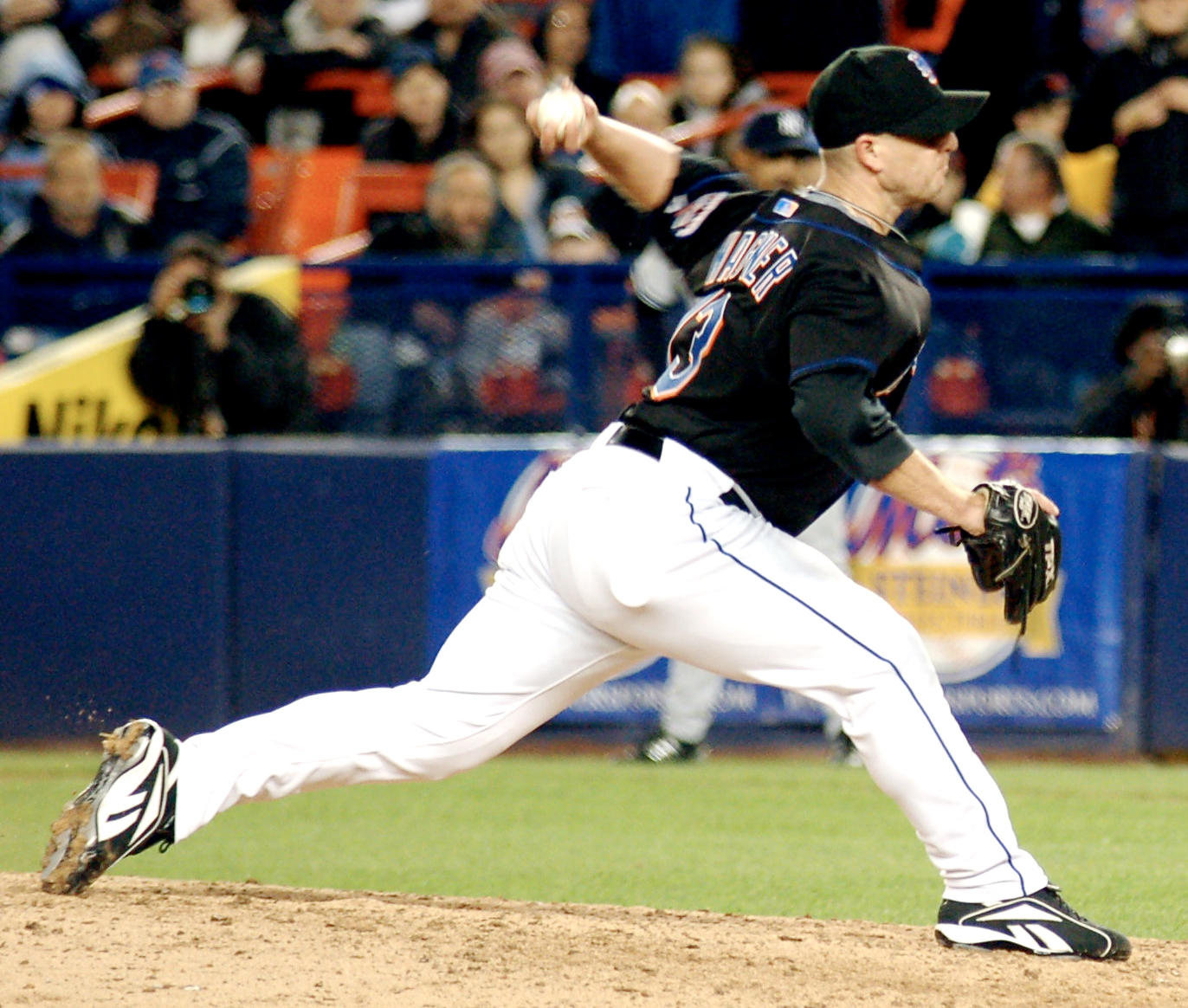
Billy Wagner, Hall of Famer, saved 59 games in two Phillies seasons.

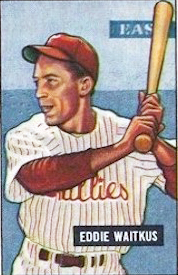
In the first year of his Phillies tenure, first baseman Eddie Waitkus was shot by an obsessed fan.

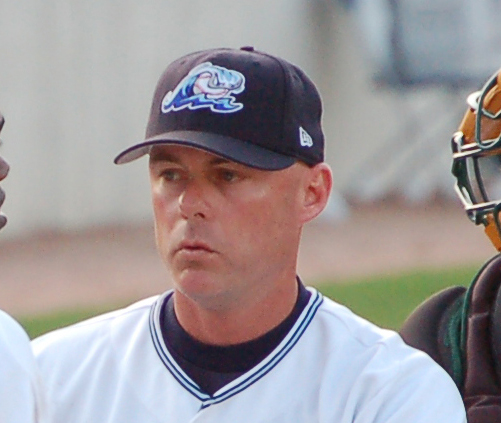
Matt Walbeck had one hit in his only Phillies plate appearance.

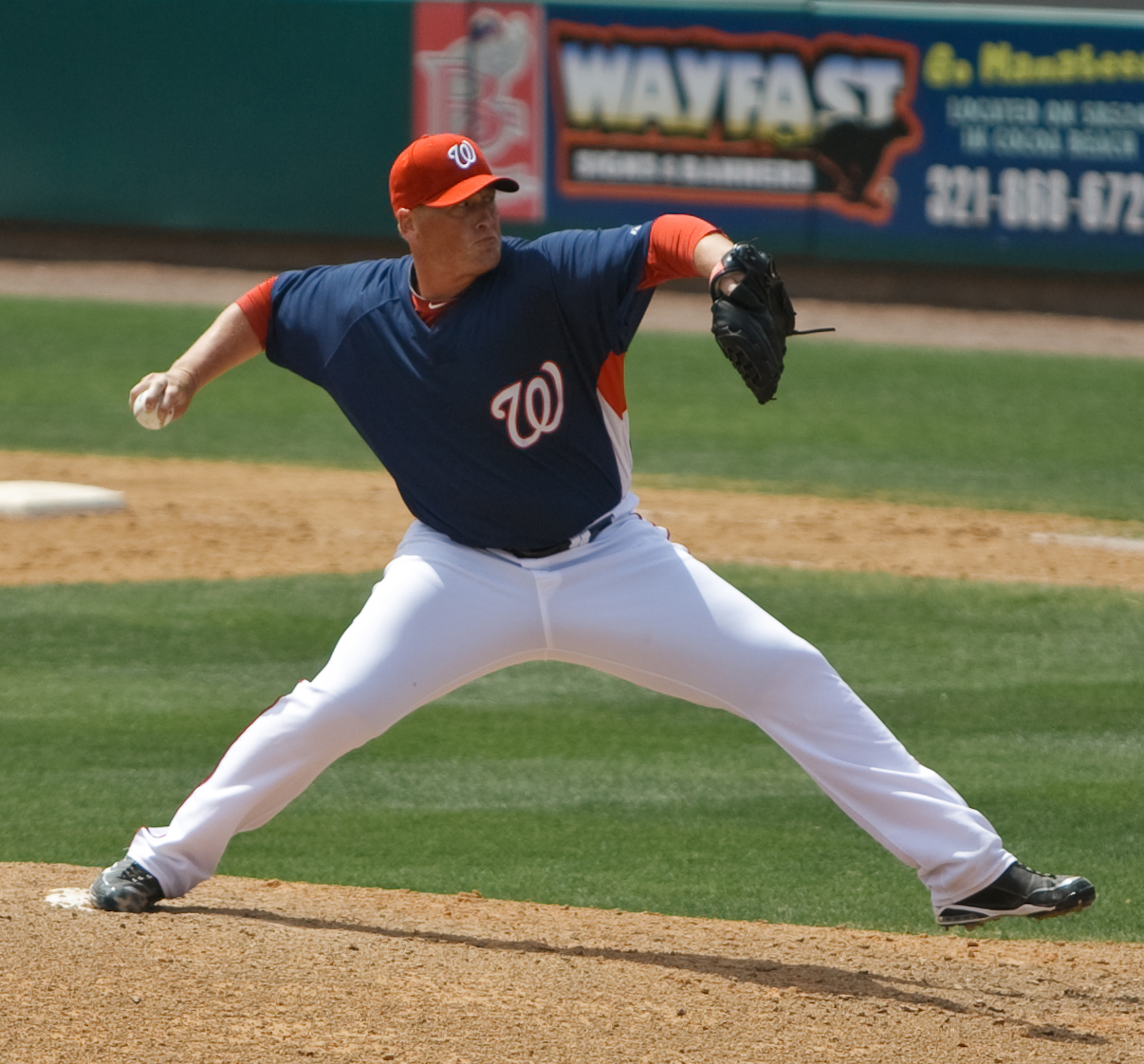
Tyler Walker pitched for Philadelphia in 2009, notching a 2–1 record.

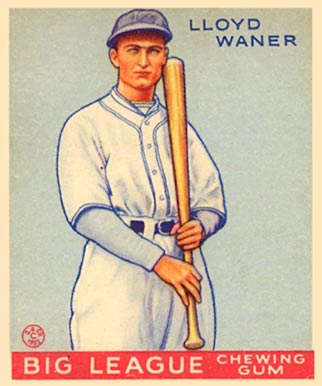
Hall of Famer Lloyd Waner played for the Phillies in 1942.

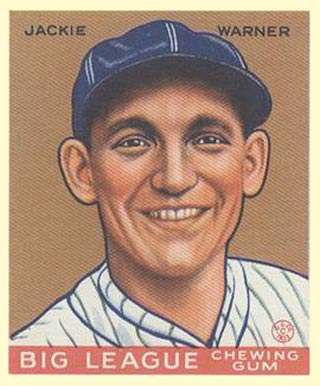
Jack Warner hit 15 doubles in his only season with Philadelphia.

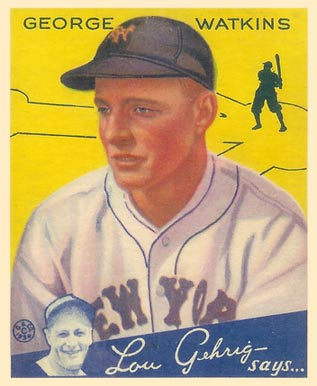
George Watkins played two seasons for the Phillies, hitting 19 home runs.

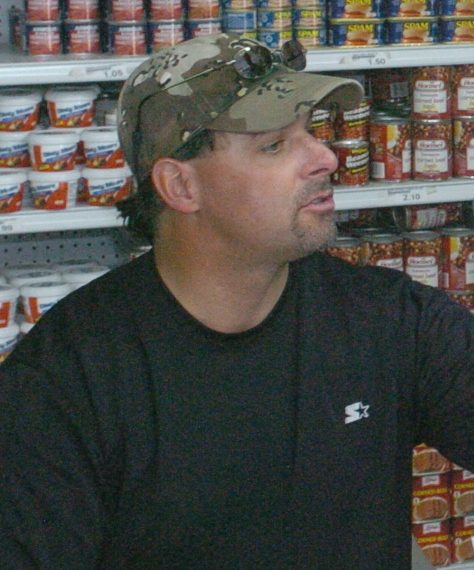
Turk Wendell struck out 42 batters pitching for Philadelphia in 2001 and 2003.

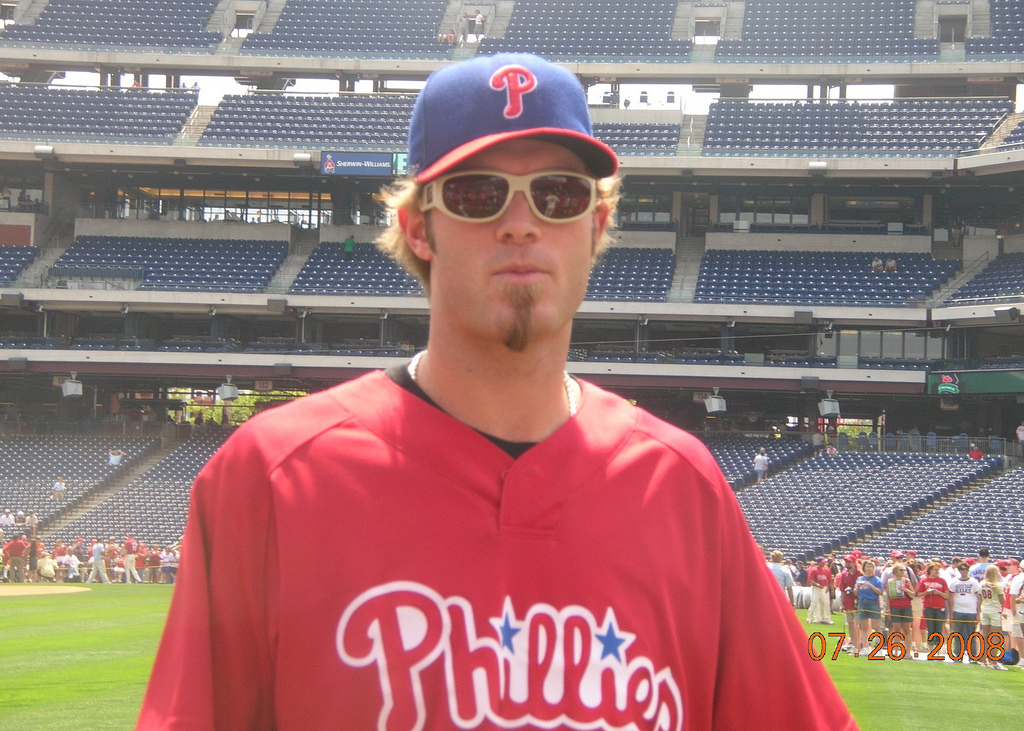
Jayson Werth hit 95 home runs and batted in 300 runs in four seasons with the Phillies.

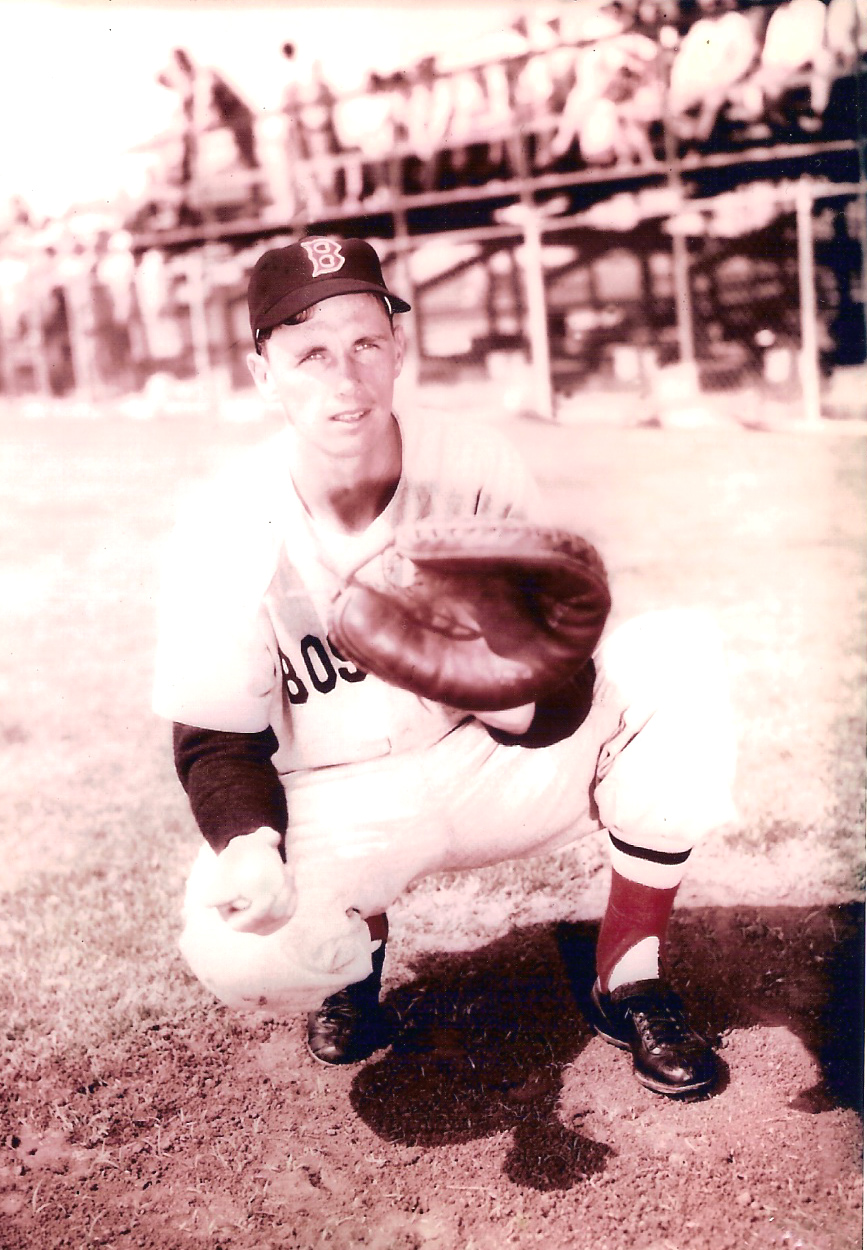
Catcher Sammy White batted .216 in the 1962 season.

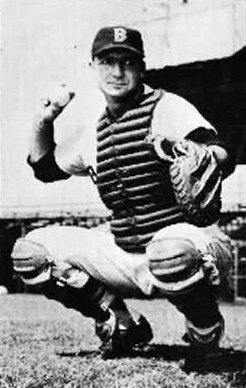
Del Wilber played two seasons for the Phillies.

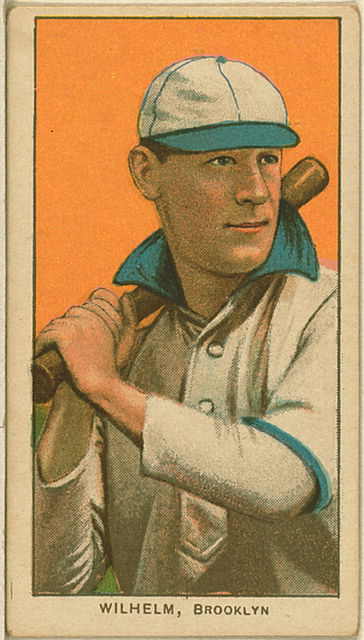
Kaiser Wilhelm struck out one batter and walked three in his short Phillies tenure.

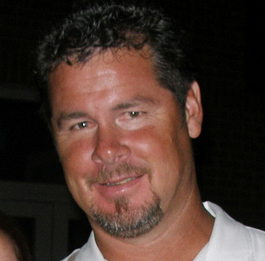
Mitch Williams saved 107 games for the Phillies in his three seasons but allowed Joe Carter's walk-off World Series-winning home run in 1993, his last pitch for the team.

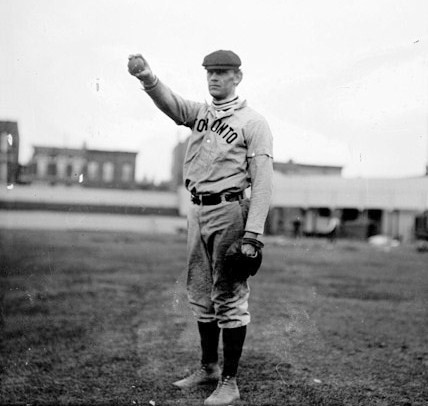
Pitcher Pop Williams won one game and lost one in his only Philadelphia season.

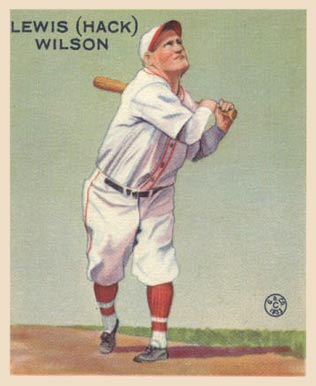
Hall of Famer Hack Wilson played for the Phillies in 1934, batting .100 with two hits in twenty at-bats.

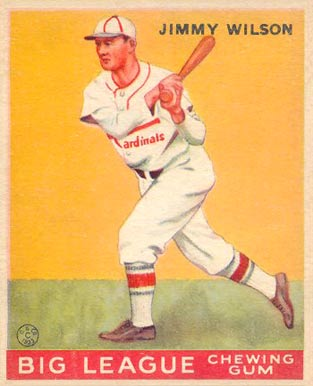
Jimmy Wilson had two tenures with Philadelphia: from 1923 to 1928, and again from 1934 to 1938.

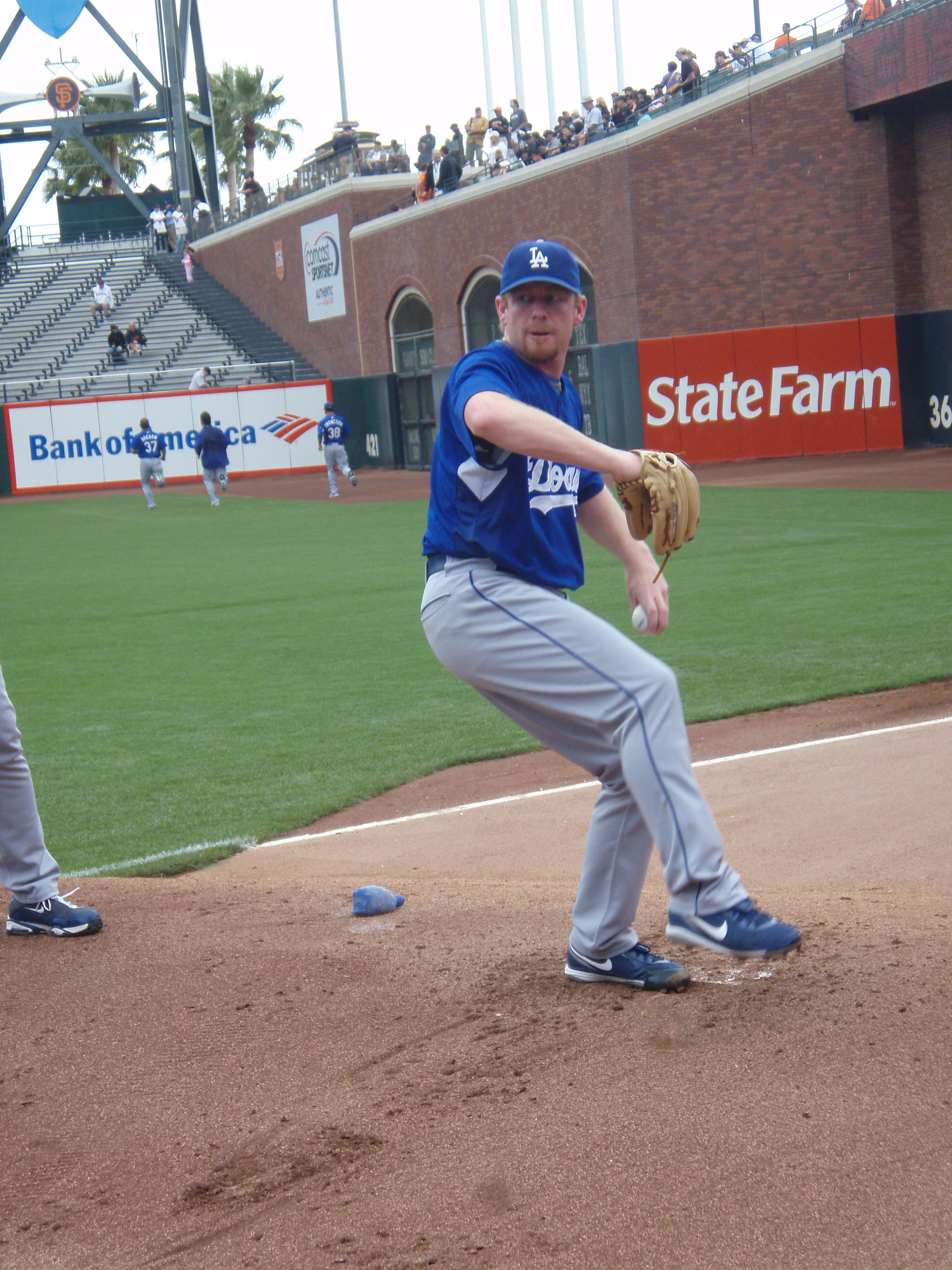
Randy Wolf pitched eight seasons for the Phillies, winning 69 games and losing 60.

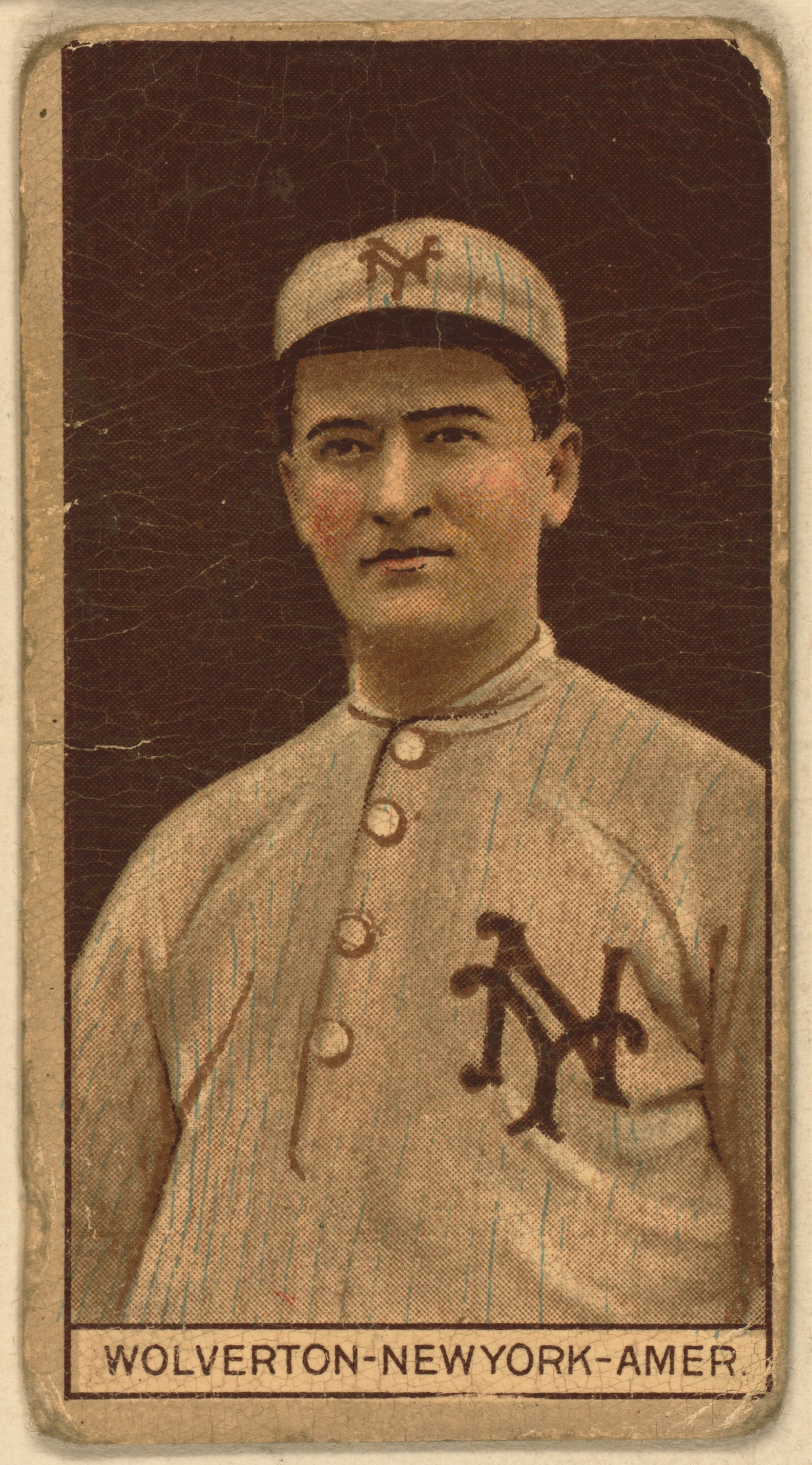
Harry Wolverton batted .292 over five Philadelphia seasons.

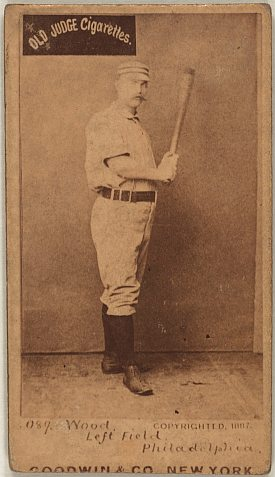
Left fielder George Wood batted in 220 runs in four years with the Phillies.

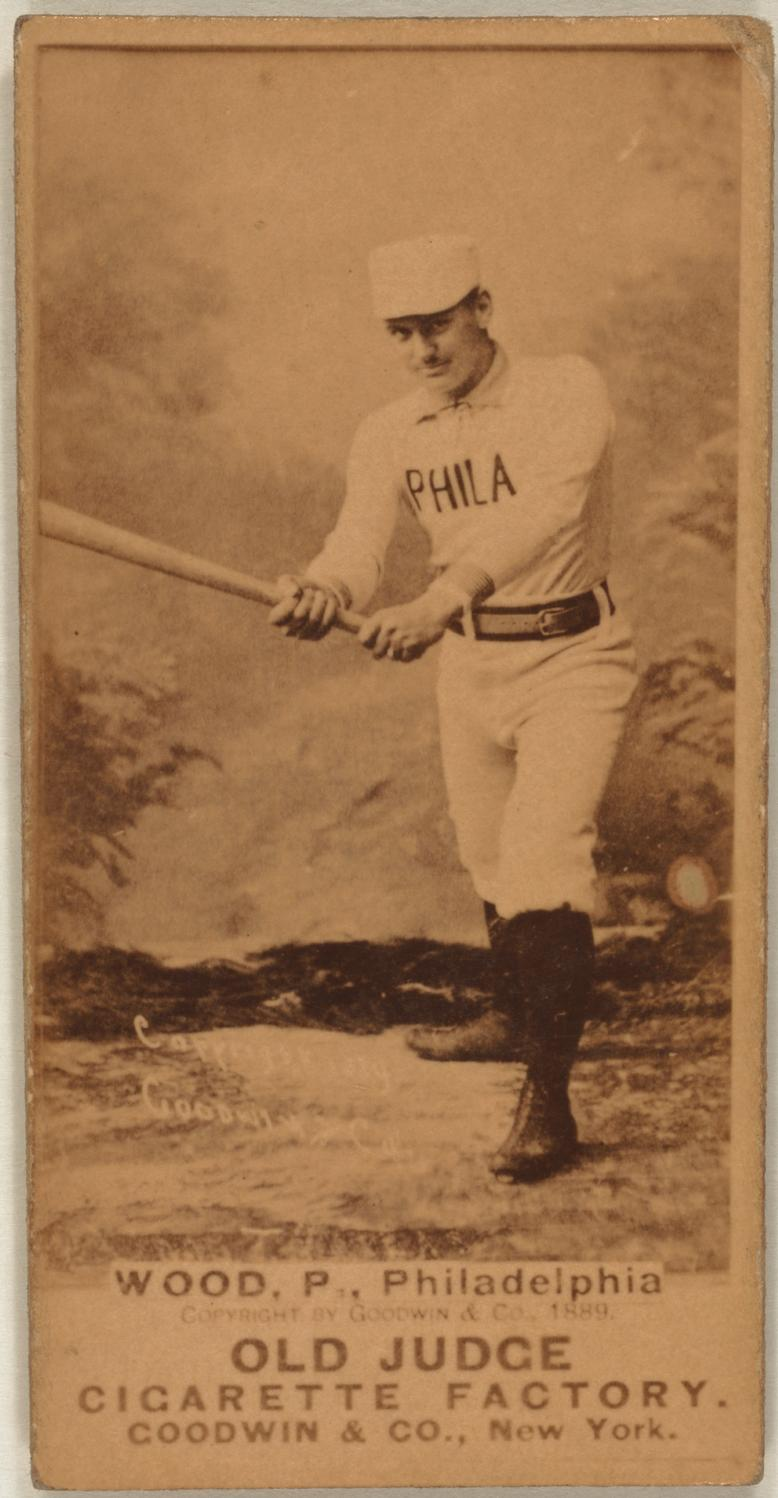
Pete Wood pitched for the Phillies in 1889.

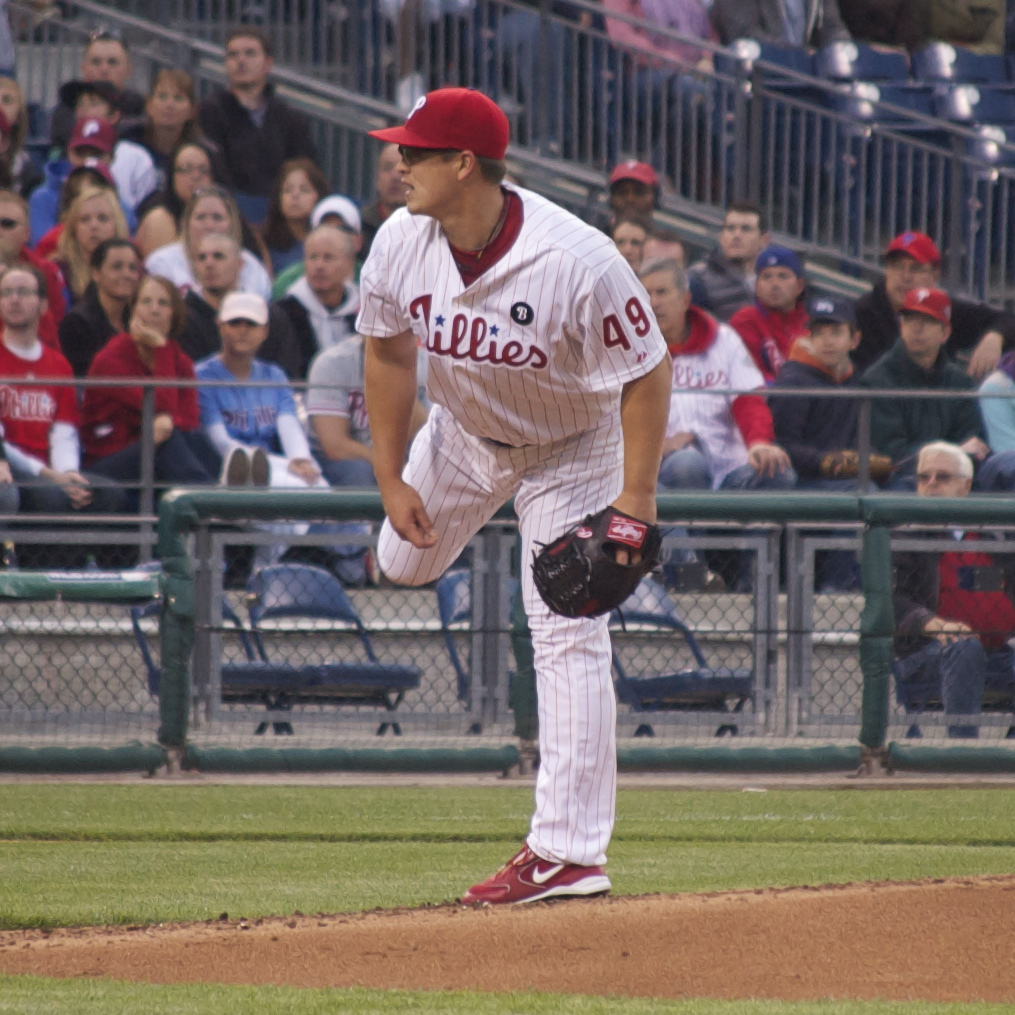
Vance Worley posted a 12–4 record through his first two major league seasons.

Tim Worrell was the Phillies' setup pitcher in 2004 and 2005.

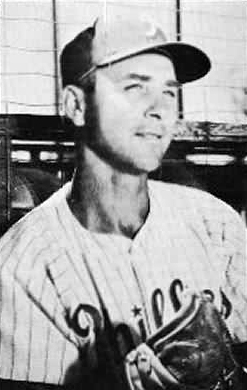
Outfielder Johnny Wyrostek played for the Phillies in 1946 and 1947, and returned for a second term from 1952 to 1954.

List of players whose surnames begin with W, showing season(s) and position(s) played and selected statistics
Name	Season(s)	Position(s)	Notes	Ref
Woody Wagenhorst	1888	Third baseman	.125 batting average; 1 hit; 2 runs scored	
Billy Wagner^{†}	2004–2005	Pitcher	8–3 record; 1.86 earned run average; 146 strikeouts; 59 saves	
Gary Wagner	1965–1969	Pitcher	11–15 record; 3.59 earned run average; 145 strikeouts	
Hal Wagner	1948–1949	Catcher	.000 batting average; 8 plate appearances; 1 strikeout	
Eddie Waitkus	1949–1953; 1955	First baseman	.281 batting average; 9 home runs; 197 runs batted in	
Charlie Waitt	1883	Center fielder	.333 batting average; 1 hit; 1 strikeout	
Matt Walbeck	2001	Pinch hitter^{[a]}	1.000 batting average; 1 hit; 1 plate appearance	
Ed Walczak	1945	Second baseman	.211 batting average; 3 doubles; 2 runs batted in	
Bob Walk	1980	Pitcher	11–7 record; 4.57 earned run average; 94 strikeouts	
Curt Walker	1921–1924	Right fielder	.311 batting average; 18 home runs; 171 runs batted in	
Harry Walker	1947–1948	Center fielder	.339 batting average; 60 extra-base hits; 64 runs batted in	
Marty Walker	1928	Pitcher	0–1 record; Infinite earned run average; 3 walks	
Tyler Walker	2009	Pitcher	2–1 record; 4.10 earned run average; 21 strikeouts	
Dave Wallace	1973–1974	Pitcher	0–1 record; 16.20 earned run average; 5 strikeouts	
Doc Wallace	1919	Shortstop	.250 batting average; 1 hit; 1 strikeout	
Huck Wallace	1912	Pitcher	0.00 earned run average; 4 strikeouts; 4 walks	
Mike Wallace	1973–1974	Pitcher	2–1 record; 4.10 earned run average; 21 strikeouts	
Lee Walls	1960–1961	Third baseman	.247 batting average; 11 home runs; 49 runs batted in	
Les Walrond	2008	Pitcher	1–1 record; 6.10 earned run average; 12 strikeouts	
Augie Walsh	1927–1928	Pitcher	4–10 record; 6.05 earned run average; 38 strikeouts	
Jimmy Walsh	1910–1913	Second baseman	.264 batting average; 6 home runs; 86 runs batted in	
John Walsh	1903	Third baseman	.000 batting average; 4 plate appearances	
Walt Walsh	1920	Pinch runner^{[b]}	2 games played; 0 plate appearances	
Bucky Walters	1934–1938	Pitcher; Third baseman	38–53 record; 4.48 earned run average; .260 batting average; 7 home runs	
Ken Walters	1960–1961	Right fielder	.236 batting average; 10 home runs; 51 runs batted in	
Lloyd Waner^{†}	1942	Center fielder	.261 batting average; 10 extra-base hits; 10 runs batted in	
Bryan Ward	2000	Pitcher	2.33 earned run average; 11 strikeouts; 8 walks	
Joe Ward	1906; 1909–1910	Second baseman	.240 batting average; 47 runs batted in; 44 runs scored	
Piggy Ward	1883; 1889	Second baseman	.133 batting average; 1 double; 4 runs batted in	
Turner Ward	2001	Pinch hitter^{[c]}	.267 batting average; 1 double; 2 runs batted in	
Fred Warner	1883	Third baseman	.227 batting average; 13 runs batted in; 13 runs scored	
Jack Warner	1933	Second baseman	.224 batting average; 15 doubles; 22 runs batted in	
Bennie Warren	1939–1942	Catcher	.224 batting average; 29 home runs; 96 runs batted in	
Dan Warthen	1977	Pitcher	0–1 record; 0.00 earned run average; 1 strikeout	
Jimmy Wasdell	1943–1946	Left fielder First baseman	.278 batting average; 15 home runs; 172 runs batted in	
Libe Washburn	1903	Pitcher	0–4 record; 4.37 earned run average; 9 strikeouts	
Buck Washer	1905	Pitcher	6.00 earned run average; 5 walks; 3 innings pitched	
Dave Watkins	1969	Catcher	.176 batting average; 4 home runs; 12 runs batted in	
Ed Watkins	1902	Left fielder	.000 batting average; 4 plate appearances	
George Watkins	1935–1936	Left fielder	.267 batting average; 19 home runs; 81 runs batted in	
Milt Watson	1918–1919	Pitcher	7–11 record; 3.95 earned run average; 41 strikeouts	
Eddie Watt	1974	Pitcher	1–1 record; 3.99 earned run average; 23 strikeouts	
Frank Watt	1931	Pitcher	5–5 record; 4.84 earned run average; 25 strikeouts	
Johnny Watwood	1939	First baseman	.167 batting average; 1 hit; 6 plate appearances	
Bill Webb	1943	Pitcher	9.00 earned run average; 1 walk; 1 run allowed	
Lenny Webster	1995	Catcher	.267 batting average; 4 home runs; 14 runs batted in	
Herm Wehmeier	1954–1956	Pitcher	20–22 record; 4.17 earned run average; 142 strikeouts	
Dave Wehrmeister	1984	Pitcher	7.20 earned run average; 13 strikeouts; 7 walks	
Lefty Weinert	1919–1924	Pitcher	14–30 record; 4.46 earned run average; 123 strikeouts	
Phil Weintraub	1938	First baseman	.311 batting average; 4 home runs; 45 runs batted in	
Bud Weiser	1915–1916	Center fielder Left fielder	.162 batting average; 3 doubles; 9 runs batted in	
Mike Welch	1998	Pitcher	0–2 record; 8.27 earned run average; 15 strikeouts	
Harry Welchonce	1911	Right fielder Center fielder	.212 batting average; 4 doubles; 6 runs batted in	
Bob Wells	1994	Pitcher	1–0 record; 1.80 earned run average; 3 strikeouts	
Lew Wendell	1924–1926	Catcher	.161 batting average; 1 double; 5 runs batted in	
Turk Wendell	2001; 2003	Pitcher	3–5 record; 4.18 earned run average; 42 strikeouts	
Fred Wenz	1970	Pitcher	2–0 record; 4.45 earned run average; 24 strikeouts	
Jayson Werth	2007–2010	Right fielder	.282 batting average; 95 home runs; 300 runs batted in	
David West	1993–1996	Pitcher	15–18 record; 3.50 earned run average; 217 strikeouts	
Jim Westlake	1955	Pinch hitter^{[d]}	.000 batting average; 1 plate appearance; 1 strikeout	
Wally Westlake	1956	Pinch hitter^{[e]}	.000 batting average; 5 plate appearances; 3 strikeouts	
Mickey Weston	1992	Pitcher	0–1 record; 12.27 earned run average; 1 walk	
Gus Weyhing	1892–1895	Pitcher	71–53 record; 4.23 earned run average; 391 strikeouts	
Mack Wheat	1920–1921	Catcher	.222 batting average; 3 home runs; 24 runs batted in	
George Wheeler	1896–1899	Pitcher	21–20 record; 4.24 earned run average; 60 strikeouts	
Bill White	1966–1968	First baseman	.258 batting average; 39 home runs; 176 runs batted in	
Deke White	1895	Pitcher	1–0 record; 9.87 earned run average; 6 strikeouts	
Doc White	1901–1902	Pitcher	30–33 record; 2.82 earned run average; 317 strikeouts	
Rick White	2006	Pitcher	3–1 record; 4.34 earned run average; 23 strikeouts	
Sammy White	1962	Catcher	.216 batting average; 2 home runs; 12 runs batted in	
Mark Whiten	1995–1996	Right fielder	.254 batting average; 18 home runs; 58 runs batted in	
Matt Whiteside	1998	Pitcher	1–1 record; 8.50 earned run average; 14 strikeouts	
Jesse Whiting	1902	Pitcher	0–1 record; 5.00 earned run average; 6 walks	
Dick Whitman	1950–1951	Right fielder Center fielder	.235 batting average; 7 doubles; 12 runs batted in	
Pinky Whitney	1928–1933; 1936–1939	Third baseman	.307 batting average; 69 home runs; 734 runs batted in	
Bill Whitrock	1896	Pitcher	0–1 record; 3.00 earned run average; 1 strikeout	
Possum Whitted	1915–1919	Left fielder	.274 batting average; 13 home runs; 216 runs batted in	
Del Wilber	1951–1952	Catcher	.275 batting average; 8 home runs; 34 runs batted in	
Kaiser Wilhelm	1921	Pitcher	3.38 earned run average; 1 strikeout; 3 walks	
Cy Williams^{§}	1918–1930	Center fielder	.306 batting average; 217 home runs; 795 runs batted in	
George Williams	1961	Second baseman	.250 batting average; 1 run batted in; 4 runs scored	
Mike Williams	1992–1996; 2003	Pitcher	13–29 record; 4.94 earned run average; 246 strikeouts	
Mitch Williams	1991–1993	Pitcher	20–20 record; 3.11 earned run average; 218 strikeouts; 107 saves	
Pop Williams	1903	Pitcher	1–1 record; 3.00 earned run average; 8 strikeouts	
Hugh Willingham	1931–1933	Shortstop	.237 batting average; 1 home run; 3 runs batted in	
Claude Willoughby	1925–1930	Pitcher	38–56 record; 5.83 earned run average; 171 strikeouts	
Bill Wilson	1969–1973	Pitcher	9–15 record; 4.22 earned run average; 171 strikeouts	
Glenn Wilson	1984–1987	Right fielder	.265 batting average; 49 home runs; 271 runs batted in	
Hack Wilson^{†}	1934	Left fielder	.100 batting average; 2 hits; 3 runs batted in	
Jimmie Wilson	1923–1928; 1934–1938	Catcher	.288 batting average; 22 home runs; 315 runs batted in	
Max Wilson	1940	Pitcher	12.86 earned run average; 3 strikeouts; 2 walks	
Hal Wiltse	1931	Pitcher	9.00 earned run average; 1 run allowed; 1 inning pitched	
Bobby Wine	1960; 1962–1968	Shortstop	.216 batting average; 23 home runs; 176 runs batted in	
Darrin Winston	1997–1998	Pitcher	4–2 record; 5.84 earned run average; 19 strikeouts	
Jesse Winters	1921–1923	Pitcher	12–22 record; 5.23 earned run average; 74 strikeouts	
Rick Wise	1964; 1966–1971	Pitcher	75–76 record; 3.60 earned run average; 717 strikeouts	
Frank Withrow	1920; 1922	Catcher	.203 batting average; 7 extra-base hits; 15 runs batted in	
John Wockenfuss	1984–1985	First baseman Catcher	.267 batting average; 6 home runs; 26 runs batted in	
Andy Woehr	1923–1924	Third baseman	.244 batting average; 11 extra-base hits; 20 runs batted in	
Randy Wolf	1999–2006	Pitcher	69–60 record; 4.21 earned run average; 971 strikeouts	
Bill Wolff	1902	Pitcher	0–1 record; 4.00 earned run average; 3 strikeouts	
Abe Wolstenholme	1883	Catcher; Left fielder	.091 batting average; 1 double; 11 plate appearances	
Harry Wolverton	1900–1904	Third baseman	.292 batting average; 3 home runs; 219 runs batted in	
George Wood	1886–1889	Left fielder	.262 batting average; 29 home runs; 220 runs batted in	
Pete Wood	1889	Pitcher	1–1 record; 5.21 earned run average; 8 strikeouts	
Jim Woods	1960–1961	Third baseman	.207 batting average; 3 home runs; 12 runs batted in	
Frank Woodward	1918–1919	Pitcher	6–9 record; 4.81 earned run average; 31 strikeouts	
Shawn Wooten	2004	First baseman	.170 batting average; 3 doubles; 2 runs batted in	
Vance Worley	2010–2011	Pitcher	12–4 record; 2.86 earned run average; 131 strikeouts	
Tim Worrell	2004–2005	Pitcher	5–7 record; 4.34 earned run average; 81 strikeouts	
Russ Wrightstone	1920–1928	Third baseman First baseman	.298 batting average; 59 home runs; 420 runs batted in	
Whit Wyatt	1945	Pitcher	0–7 record; 5.26 earned run average; 10 strikeouts	
Johnny Wyrostek	1946–1947; 1952–1954	Right fielder Center fielder	.271 batting average; 21 home runs; 208 runs batted in	

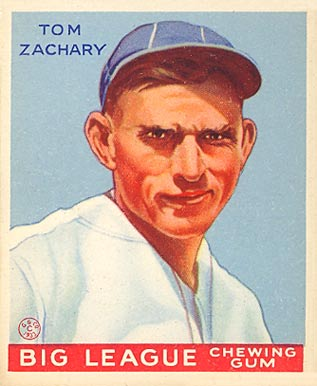
Tom Zachary lost three games for Philadelphia in 1936.

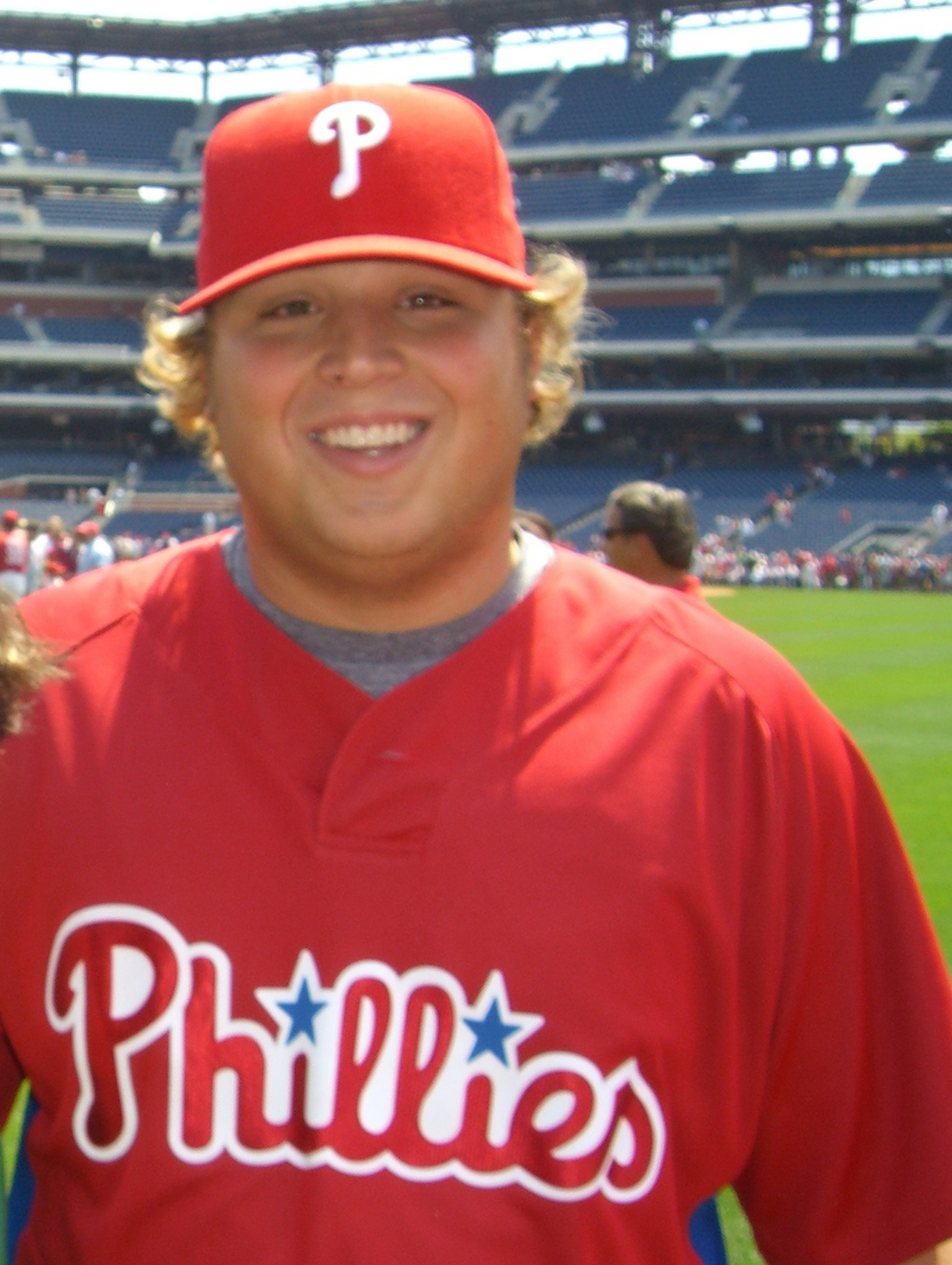
Mike Zagurski has an undefeated 1–0 record through the end of the 2011 season.

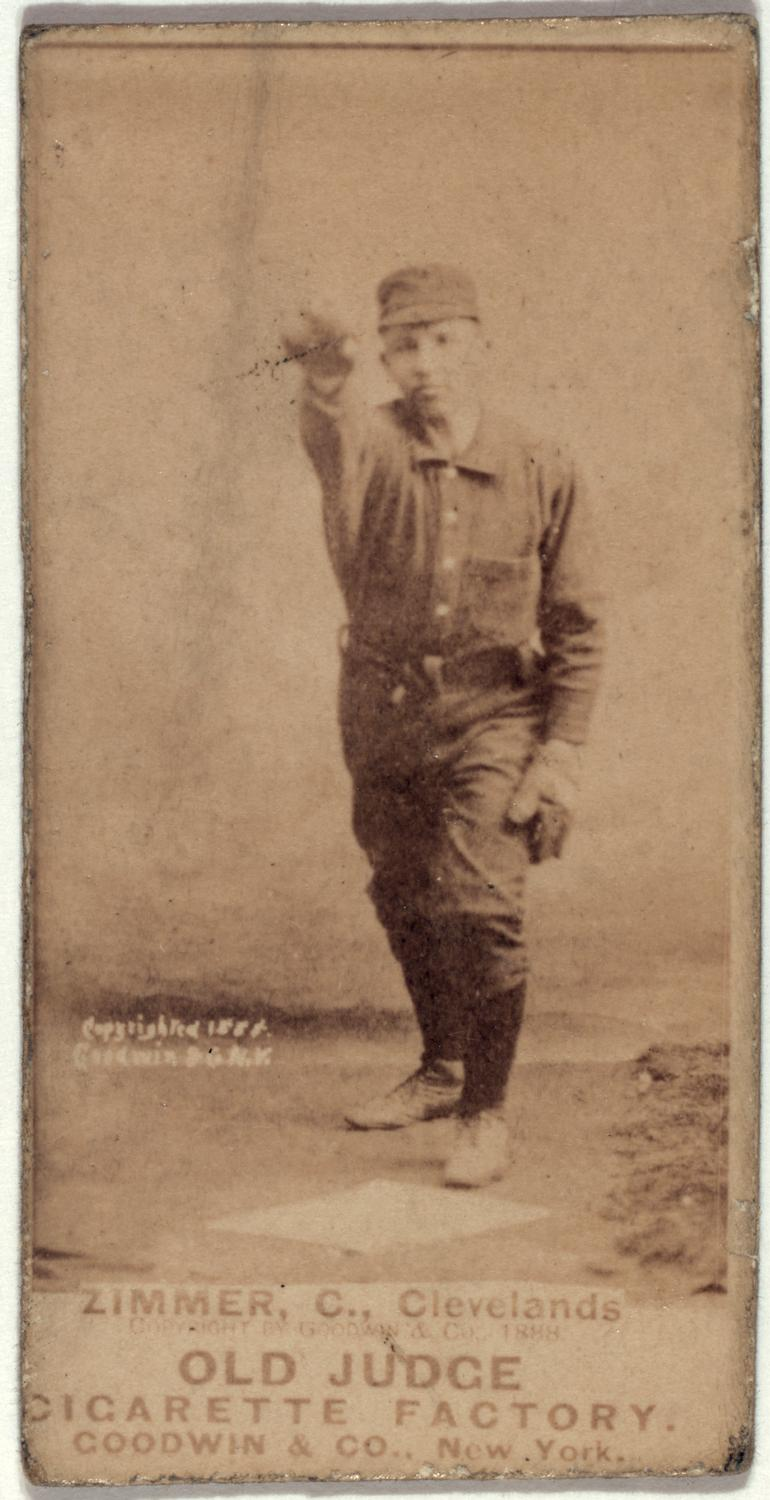
Chief Zimmer hit a lone home run in his only Phillies season.

List of players whose surnames begin with Y, showing season(s) and position(s) played and selected statistics
Name	Season(s)	Position(s)	Notes	Ref
Rusty Yarnall	1926	Pitcher	0–1 record; 18.00 earned run average; 1 walk	
Bert Yeabsley	1919	Pinch hitter^{[f]}	1.000 on-base percentage; 1 walk; 1 plate appearance	
Charlie Yingling	1894	Shortstop	.250 batting average; 1 hit; 1 strikeout	
Floyd Youmans	1989	Pitcher	1–5 record; 5.70 earned run average; 20 strikeouts	
Bobby Young	1958	Second baseman	.233 batting average; 1 home run; 4 runs batted in	
Del Young	1937–1940	Shortstop; Second baseman	.224 batting average; 3 home runs; 76 runs batted in	
Dick Young	1951–1952	Second baseman	.234 batting average; 6 doubles; 2 runs batted in	
Mike Young	1988	Right fielder	.226 batting average; 1 home run; 14 runs batted in	

List of players whose surnames begin with Z, showing season(s) and position(s) played and selected statistics
Name	Season(s)	Position(s)	Notes	Ref
Tom Zachary	1936	Pitcher	0–3 record; 7.97 earned run average; 8 strikeouts	
Pat Zachry	1985	Pitcher	4.26 earned run average; 8 strikeouts; 11 walks	
Mike Zagurski	2007; 2010–2011	Pitcher	1–0 record; 6.82 earned run average; 36 strikeouts	
Todd Zeile	1996	Third baseman	.268 batting average; 20 home runs; 80 runs batted in	
Charlie Ziegler	1900	Third baseman	.273 batting average; 3 hits; 1 run batted in	
Chief Zimmer	1903	Catcher	.220 batting average; 1 home run; 19 runs batted in	
Jon Zuber	1996; 1998	First baseman	.250 batting average; 3 home runs; 16 runs batted in	

== Footnotes ==
Key

- ^{H} The National Baseball Hall of Fame and Museum determines which cap a player wears on their plaque, signifying "the team with which he made his most indelible mark". The Hall of Fame considers the player's wishes in making their decision, but the Hall makes the final decision as "it is important that the logo be emblematic of the historical accomplishments of that player's career".
- ^{P} Players are listed at a position if they appeared in 30% of their games or more during their Phillies career, as defined by Baseball-Reference.com. Additional positions may be shown on the Baseball-Reference website by following each player's citation.
- ^{R} Franchise batting and pitching leaders are drawn from Baseball-Reference.com. A total of 1,500 plate appearances are needed to qualify for batting records, and 500 innings pitched or 50 decisions are required to qualify for pitching records.
- ^{S} Statistics are correct as of the end of the 2010 Major League Baseball season.

Table

- ^{a} Matt Walbeck is listed by Baseball-Reference as a catcher, but never appeared in a game in the field for the Phillies.
- ^{b} Walt Walsh is listed by Baseball-Reference without a position; he never appeared in a game in the field in his major league career.
- ^{c} Turner Ward is listed by Baseball-Reference as an outfielder, but never appeared in a game in the field for the Phillies.
- ^{d} Jim Westlake is listed by Baseball-Reference without a position; he never appeared in a game in the field in his major league career.
- ^{e} Wally Westlake is listed by Baseball-Reference as an outfielder and third baseman, but never appeared in a game in the field for the Phillies.
- ^{f} Bert Yeabsley is listed by Baseball-Reference without a position; he never appeared in a game in the field in his major league career.
