= Thomas Maher =

Thomas Maher may refer to:

- Tom Maher (baseball) (1870–1929), American baseball player
- T. J. Maher (1922–2002), Irish politician
- Tom Maher (born 1952), Australian basketball coach

== See also ==
- Tom Mahir (1915–1970), British police officer
- Maher (disambiguation)
