= Clise Dudley =

American baseball player (1903–1989)

Elzie Clise Dudley
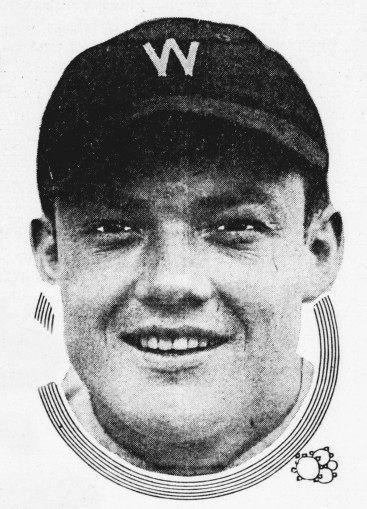
- Dudley in 1925
- Pitcher
- Born: August 8, 1903; Graham, North Carolina, U.S.
- Died: January 12, 1989 (aged 85); Moncks Corner, South Carolina, U.S.
- Batted: Left Threw: Right

MLB debut
- April 18, 1929, for the Brooklyn Robins

Last MLB appearance
- September 15, 1933, for the Pittsburgh Pirates

MLB statistics
- Win–loss record: 17–33
- Earned run average: 5.03
- Strikeouts: 106
- Stats at Baseball Reference

Teams
- Brooklyn Robins (1929–1930); Philadelphia Phillies (1931–1932); Pittsburgh Pirates (1933)

Elzie Clise Dudley (August 8, 1903 – January 12, 1989) was a pitcher in Major League Baseball. He pitched from 1929 to 1933. He attended the University of South Carolina.

On April 27, 1929, Dudley became only the second Major League player, and first pitcher, to hit a home run on the first pitch he ever saw. (Walter Mueller, an outfielder, was the first player to do so- in 1922.) Despite the achievement, Brooklyn lost 8–3 to the Philadelphia Phillies.

== See also ==
- Home run in first Major League at-bat
