= 1902 Brooklyn Superbas season =

1902 Brooklyn Superbas
- League: National League
- Ballpark: Washington Park
- City: Brooklyn, New York
- Record: 75–63 (.543)
- League place: 2nd
- Owners: Charles Ebbets, Ferdinand Abell, Harry Von der Horst, Ned Hanlon
- President: Charles Ebbets
- Managers: Ned Hanlon

The 1902 Brooklyn Superbas finished in a distant second place in the National League, 27.5 games behind the Pittsburgh Pirates.

== Regular season ==
=== Season standings ===
National League
Team	W	L	Pct.	GB	Home	Road
Pittsburgh Pirates	103	36	.741	—	56‍–‍15	47‍–‍21
Brooklyn Superbas	75	63	.543	27½	45‍–‍23	30‍–‍40
Boston Beaneaters	73	64	.533	29	42‍–‍27	31‍–‍37
Cincinnati Reds	70	70	.500	33½	35‍–‍35	35‍–‍35
Chicago Orphans	68	69	.496	34	31‍–‍38	37‍–‍31
St. Louis Cardinals	56	78	.418	44½	28‍–‍38	28‍–‍40
Philadelphia Phillies	56	81	.409	46	29‍–‍39	27‍–‍42
New York Giants	48	88	.353	53½	24‍–‍44	24‍–‍44

=== Record vs. opponents ===
1902 National League record Sources:
Team	BSN	BRO	CHC	CIN	NYG	PHI	PIT	STL
Boston	—	8–12	11–9	11–9	16–3	11–9–1	6–14–1	10–8–3
Brooklyn	12–8	—	12–8	12–8	10–10	13–6	6–14–1	10–9–2
Chicago	9–11	8–12	—	12–8–1	10–10–4	10–10	7–13	12–5–1
Cincinnati	9–11	8–12	8–12–1	—	14–6	13–7	5–15	13–7
New York	3–16	10–10	10–10–4	6–14	—	6–12	6–13–1	7–13
Philadelphia	9–11–1	6–13	10–10	7–13	12–6	—	2–18	10–10
Pittsburgh	14–6–1	14–6–1	13–7	15–5	13–6–1	18–2	—	16–4
St. Louis	8–10–3	9–10–2	5–12–1	7–13	13–7	10–10	4–16	—

=== Roster ===
1902 Brooklyn Superbas
Roster
Pitchers: Bill Donovan; Roy Evans; Ned Garvin; Jay Hughes; Frank Kitson; Gene McCann; John McMakin; Doc Newton; Lave Winham	Catchers: Pat Deisel; Duke Farrell; Nig Fuller; Hughie Hearne; Tacks Latimer; Lew Ritter; Joe Wall; Infielders: Bill Dahlen; Tim Flood; Charlie Irwin; Tom McCreery; Ed Wheeler	Outfielders: Cozy Dolan; George Hildebrand; Willie Keeler; Jimmy Sheckard; Rube Ward	Manager: Ned Hanlon

== Player stats ==
=== Batting ===
==== Starters by position ====
Note: Pos = Position; G = Games played; AB = At bats; R = Runs; H = Hits; Avg. = Batting average; HR = Home runs; RBI = Runs batted in; SB = Stolen bases

Pos	Player	G	AB	R	H	Avg.	HR	RBI	SB
C	Hughie Hearne	66	231	22	65	.281	0	28	3
1B	Tom McCreery	112	430	49	105	.244	4	57	16
2B	Tim Flood	132	476	43	104	.218	3	51	8
3B	Charlie Irwin	131	458	59	125	.273	2	43	13
SS	Bill Dahlen	138	527	67	139	.264	2	74	20
OF	Cozy Dolan	141	592	72	166	.280	1	54	24
OF	Willie Keeler	133	559	86	186	.333	0	38	19
OF	Jimmy Sheckard	123	486	86	129	.265	4	37	23

==== Other batters ====
Note: G = Games played; AB = At bats; R = Runs; H = Hits; Avg. = Batting average; HR = Home runs; RBI = Runs batted in; SB = Stolen bases

Player	G	AB	R	H	Avg.	HR	RBI	SB
Duke Farrell	74	264	14	64	.242	0	24	6
Ed Wheeler	30	96	4	12	.125	0	5	1
Lew Ritter	16	57	5	12	.211	0	2	0
George Hildebrand	11	41	3	9	.220	0	5	0
Rube Ward	13	31	4	9	.290	0	2	0
Tacks Latimer	8	24	0	1	.042	0	0	0
Joe Wall	5	18	0	3	.167	0	0	0
Nig Fuller	3	9	0	0	.000	0	1	0
Pat Deisel	1	3	0	2	.667	0	1	0

=== Pitching ===
==== Starting pitchers ====
Note: G = Games pitched; GS = Games started; CG = Complete games; IP = Innings pitched; W = Wins; L = Losses; ERA = Earned run average; BB = Bases on balls; SO = Strikeouts

Player	G	GS	CG	IP	W	L	ERA	BB	SO
Bill Donovan	35	33	30	297.2	17	15	2.78	111	170
Doc Newton	31	28	26	264.1	15	14	2.42	87	107
Frank Kitson	31	30	28	259.2	19	12	2.84	48	107
Jay Hughes	31	30	27	254.0	15	11	2.87	55	94
Roy Evans	13	11	11	97.1	5	6	2.68	33	35
John McMakin	4	4	4	32.0	2	2	3.09	11	6
Gene McCann	3	3	3	30.0	1	2	2.40	12	9
Ned Garvin	2	2	2	18.0	1	1	1.00	4	7

==== Relief pitchers ====
Note: G = Games pitched; IP = Innings pitched; W = Wins; L = Losses; SV = Saves; ERA = Earned run average; BB = Bases on balls; SO = Strikeouts

Player	G	IP	W	L	SV	ERA	BB	SO
Lave Winham	1	3.0	0	0	0	0.00	2	1
