= Allie Watt =

American baseball player (1899-1968)

- Second baseman
- Born: December 12, 1899; Philadelphia, Pennsylvania, U.S.
- Died: March 15, 1968 (aged 68); Norfolk, Virginia, U.S.
- Batted: Right Threw: Right

MLB debut
- October 3, 1920, for the Washington Senators

Last MLB appearance
- October 3, 1920, for the Washington Senators

MLB statistics
- Games played: 1
- At bats: 1
- Hits: 1
- Stats at Baseball Reference

Teams
- Washington Senators (1920)

Albert Bailey Watt (December 12, 1899 – March 15, 1968) was an American Major League Baseball player who played in 1920 with the Washington Senators. Watt was the brother of former Major Leaguer, Frank Watt.

He was born in Philadelphia, and died in Norfolk, Virginia.

Allie Watt was 5'8'' and 154 pounds. He had one at bat and hit a RBI in his only at bat. Because of this his slugging is 2.000.

With a double in his only turn at-bat, Watt is one of the rare Major Leaguers with a career batting average of 1.000.

Watt, who once played second base, is a real-life example of a baseball player with a surname reminiscent of Baseball Hall of Fame inductees Abbott and Costello's "Who's on First?" comedy routine, specifically the line "What's on second."
