= Frank Mahar =

American baseball player (1878–1961)

- Outfielder
- Born: December 4, 1878; Natick, Massachusetts, U.S.
- Died: December 5, 1961 (aged 83); Somerville, Massachusetts, U.S.
- Batted: Unknown Threw: Right

MLB debut
- August 29, 1902, for the Philadelphia Phillies

Last MLB appearance
- August 29, 1902, for the Philadelphia Phillies

MLB statistics
- Games played: 1
- At bats: 1
- Hits: 0
- Stats at Baseball Reference

Teams
- Philadelphia Phillies (1902)

Frank Edward Mahar (December 4, 1878 – December 5, 1961) was an American Major League Baseball outfielder who played in 1902 with the Philadelphia Phillies. Mahar played in 1 game, going hitless in one at bat.

He was born in Natick, Massachusetts and died in Somerville, Massachusetts.
