= Henry Krug =

American baseball player (1876–1908)

- Outfielder / Second baseman
- Born: December 4, 1876; San Francisco, California, U.S.
- Died: January 14, 1908 (aged 31); San Francisco, California, U.S.
- Batted: Right Threw: Right

MLB debut
- July 25, 1902, for the Philadelphia Phillies

Last MLB appearance
- September 30, 1902, for the Philadelphia Phillies

MLB statistics
- Batting average: .227
- Home runs: 0
- Runs batted in: 14
- Stats at Baseball Reference

Teams
- Philadelphia Phillies (1902)

Henry Charles Krug (December 4, 1876 – January 14, 1908) was an American professional baseball player. He played in Major League Baseball (MLB) for the 1902 Philadelphia Phillies primary as an outfielder and second baseman, while also appearing in several games as a shortstop and third baseman.

Krug's professional career spanned from 1894 to 1907, mainly in Minor League Baseball including time in the Pacific Coast League, Southern Association, and New York State League. While still an active player, Krug died in January 1908 in his hometown of San Francisco.

== See also ==
- List of baseball players who died during their careers
