= Bill Thomas (baseball) =

American baseball player (1877-1950)

- Outfielder
- Born: December 8, 1877; Norristown, Pennsylvania, US
- Died: January 14, 1950 (aged 72); Evansburg, Pennsylvania, US
- Batted: Right Threw: Right

MLB debut
- May 1, 1902, for the Philadelphia Phillies

Last MLB appearance
- September 8, 1902, for the Philadelphia Phillies

MLB statistics
- Batting average: .118
- Home runs: 0
- Runs batted in: 0
- Stats at Baseball Reference

Teams
- Philadelphia Phillies (1902)

William Miskey Thomas (December 8, 1877 – January 14, 1950) was an American Major League Baseball outfielder who played in 1902 with the Philadelphia Phillies.

Thomas was the brother of fellow Major Leaguer, Roy Thomas.

He was born in Norristown, Pennsylvania and died in Evansburg, Pennsylvania.
