= Red Long =

Canadian baseball player (1876-1929)

- Pitcher
- Born: September 28, 1876; Burlington, Ontario, Canada
- Died: August 11, 1929 (aged 52); Hamilton, Ontario, Canada
- Batted: Right Threw: Right

MLB debut
- September 11, 1902, for the Boston Beaneaters

Last MLB appearance
- September 11, 1902, for the Boston Beaneaters

MLB statistics
- Win–loss record: 0-0
- Earned run average: 1.13
- Strikeouts: 5
- Stats at Baseball Reference

Teams
- Boston Beaneaters (1902)

Nelson "Red" Long (September 28, 1876 – August 11, 1929) was a Canadian Major League Baseball pitcher. He played for the Boston Beaneaters of the National League in one game on September 11, 1902.
