= Ed Watkins =

American baseball player (1877-1933)

- Outfielder
- Born: June 21, 1877; Philadelphia, Pennsylvania, U.S.
- Died: March 29, 1933 (aged 55); Kelvin, Arizona, U.S.
- Batted: Unknown Threw: Unknown

MLB debut
- September 6, 1902, for the Philadelphia Phillies

Last MLB appearance
- September 6, 1902, for the Philadelphia Phillies

MLB statistics
- Games played: 1
- At bats: 3
- Hits: 0
- Stats at Baseball Reference

Teams
- Philadelphia Phillies (1902)

James Edward Watkins (June 21, 1877 – March 29, 1933) was an American Major League Baseball outfielder who played in 1902 with the Philadelphia Phillies.

Watkins played in 1 game, going 0–3, with a walk.

He was born in Philadelphia, Pennsylvania and died in Kelvin, Arizona.
