= 1902 Pittsburgh Pirates season =

1902 Pittsburgh Pirates
- National League champions
- League: National League
- Ballpark: Exposition Park
- City: Allegheny, Pennsylvania
- Record: 103–36 (.741)
- League place: 1st
- Owners: Barney Dreyfuss
- Managers: Fred Clarke

The 1902 Pittsburgh (Note: In the early 20th century and earlier, the name of Pittsburgh was spelled with and without the 'h'.) Pirates won a second straight National League pennant, by an overwhelming 27.5 game margin over the Brooklyn Superbas. It was the Pirates' first ever 100-win team, and it set franchise records that still stand for winning percentage (.741) and winning percentage at home (.789).

The team finished with a league-best record of 103–36.

== Background ==
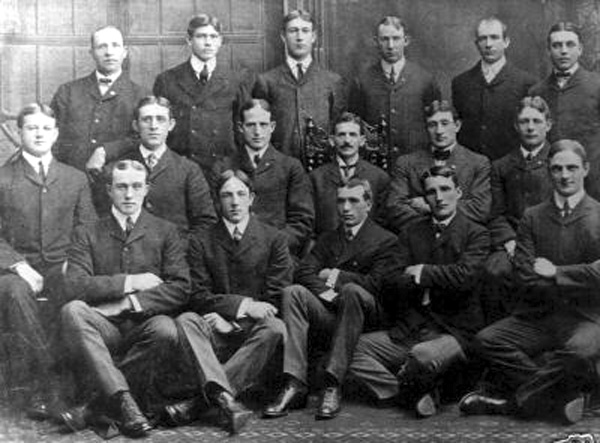
The 1902 Pittsburgh Pirates

Ginger Beaumont won the batting title with a .357 mark, and Tommy Leach led the league in home runs with six (a major league record for fewest HRs to lead the league). Honus Wagner led the league in RBI with 91, and Jack Chesbro led the league with 28 wins.

The Pirates led the league in most offensive categories, including runs scored, hits, doubles, triples, RBI, batting average, on-base percentage, and slugging percentage, and were one off the league lead in home runs. The team's 774 runs exceeded the next-highest total by 142.

The team allowed four home runs during its 1902 season, the fewest in MLB history.

== Regular season ==
=== Season standings ===
National League
| Team | W | L | Pct. | GB | Home | Road |
|---|---|---|---|---|---|---|
| Pittsburgh Pirates | 103 | 36 | .741 | — | 56‍–‍15 | 47‍–‍21 |
| Brooklyn Superbas | 75 | 63 | .543 | 27½ | 45‍–‍23 | 30‍–‍40 |
| Boston Beaneaters | 73 | 64 | .533 | 29 | 42‍–‍27 | 31‍–‍37 |
| Cincinnati Reds | 70 | 70 | .500 | 33½ | 35‍–‍35 | 35‍–‍35 |
| Chicago Orphans | 68 | 69 | .496 | 34 | 31‍–‍38 | 37‍–‍31 |
| St. Louis Cardinals | 56 | 78 | .418 | 44½ | 28‍–‍38 | 28‍–‍40 |
| Philadelphia Phillies | 56 | 81 | .409 | 46 | 29‍–‍39 | 27‍–‍42 |
| New York Giants | 48 | 88 | .353 | 53½ | 24‍–‍44 | 24‍–‍44 |

=== Record vs. opponents ===
1902 National League record Sources:
| Team | BSN | BRO | CHC | CIN | NYG | PHI | PIT | STL |
|---|---|---|---|---|---|---|---|---|
| Boston | — | 8–12 | 11–9 | 11–9 | 16–3 | 11–9–1 | 6–14–1 | 10–8–3 |
| Brooklyn | 12–8 | — | 12–8 | 12–8 | 10–10 | 13–6 | 6–14–1 | 10–9–2 |
| Chicago | 9–11 | 8–12 | — | 12–8–1 | 10–10–4 | 10–10 | 7–13 | 12–5–1 |
| Cincinnati | 9–11 | 8–12 | 8–12–1 | — | 14–6 | 13–7 | 5–15 | 13–7 |
| New York | 3–16 | 10–10 | 10–10–4 | 6–14 | — | 6–12 | 6–13–1 | 7–13 |
| Philadelphia | 9–11–1 | 6–13 | 10–10 | 7–13 | 12–6 | — | 2–18 | 10–10 |
| Pittsburgh | 14–6–1 | 14–6–1 | 13–7 | 15–5 | 13–6–1 | 18–2 | — | 16–4 |
| St. Louis | 8–10–3 | 9–10–2 | 5–12–1 | 7–13 | 13–7 | 10–10 | 4–16 | — |

=== Roster ===
1902 Pittsburgh Pirates
Roster
| Pitchers: Jack Chesbro; Harvey Cushman; Ed Doheny; Sam Leever; Warren McLaughlin; Deacon Phillippe; Ed Poole; Jesse Tannehill | Catchers: Lee Fohl; Mike Hopkins; Jack O'Connor; Ed Phelps; Harry Smith; Chief Zimmer; Infielders: Kitty Bransfield; Jimmy Burke; Wid Conroy; Tommy Leach; Claude Ritchey; Honus Wagner | Outfielders: Ginger Beaumont; Fred Clarke; Fred Crolius; Lefty Davis; George Merritt; Bill Miller; Jimmy Sebring | Manager: Fred Clarke |

== Player stats ==
| = Indicates team leader |

=== Batting ===
==== Starters by position ====
Note: Pos = Position; G = Games played; AB = At bats; H = Hits; Avg. = Batting average; HR = Home runs; RBI = Runs batted in

| Pos | Player | G | AB | H | Avg. | HR | RBI |
|---|---|---|---|---|---|---|---|
| C | Harry Smith | 50 | 185 | 35 | .189 | 0 | 12 |
| 1B | Kitty Bransfield | 102 | 413 | 126 | .305 | 0 | 69 |
| 2B | Claude Ritchey | 115 | 405 | 112 | .277 | 2 | 55 |
| SS | Wid Conroy | 99 | 365 | 89 | .244 | 1 | 47 |
| 3B | Tommy Leach | 135 | 514 | 143 | .278 | 6 | 85 |
| OF | Honus Wagner | 136 | 534 | 176 | .330 | 3 | 91 |
| OF | Fred Clarke | 113 | 459 | 145 | .316 | 2 | 53 |
| OF | Ginger Beaumont | 130 | 541 | 193 | .357 | 0 | 67 |

==== Other batters ====
Note: G = Games played; AB = At bats; H = Hits; Avg. = Batting average; HR = Home runs; RBI = Runs batted in

| Player | G | AB | H | Avg. | HR | RBI |
|---|---|---|---|---|---|---|
| Lefty Davis | 59 | 232 | 65 | .280 | 0 | 20 |
| Jimmy Burke | 60 | 203 | 60 | .296 | 0 | 26 |
| Jack O'Connor | 49 | 170 | 50 | .294 | 1 | 28 |
| Chief Zimmer | 42 | 142 | 38 | .268 | 0 | 17 |
| Jimmy Sebring | 19 | 80 | 26 | .325 | 0 | 15 |
| Ed Phelps | 18 | 61 | 13 | .213 | 0 | 6 |
| Fred Crolius | 9 | 38 | 10 | .263 | 0 | 7 |
| George Merritt | 2 | 9 | 3 | .333 | 0 | 2 |
| Bill Miller | 1 | 5 | 1 | .200 | 0 | 2 |
| Lee Fohl | 1 | 3 | 0 | .000 | 0 | 0 |
| Mike Hopkins | 1 | 2 | 2 | 1.000 | 0 | 0 |

=== Pitching ===
==== Starting pitchers ====
Note: G = Games pitched; IP = Innings pitched; W = Wins; L = Losses; ERA = Earned run average; SO = Strikeouts

| Player | G | IP | W | L | ERA | SO |
|---|---|---|---|---|---|---|
| Jack Chesbro | 35 | 286.1 | 28 | 6 | 2.17 | 136 |
| Deacon Phillippe | 31 | 272.0 | 20 | 9 | 2.05 | 122 |
| Jesse Tannehill | 26 | 231.0 | 20 | 6 | 1.95 | 100 |
| Sam Leever | 28 | 222.0 | 15 | 7 | 2.39 | 86 |
| Ed Doheny | 22 | 188.1 | 16 | 4 | 2.53 | 88 |
| Warren McLaughlin | 3 | 26.0 | 3 | 0 | 2.77 | 13 |
| Harvey Cushman | 4 | 25.2 | 0 | 4 | 7.36 | 12 |

==== Relief pitchers ====
Note: G = Games pitched; W = Wins; L = Losses; SV = Saves; ERA = Earned run average; SO = Strikeouts

| Player | G | IP | W | L | ERA | SO |
|---|---|---|---|---|---|---|
| Honus Wagner | 1 | 0 | 0 | 0 | 0.00 | 5 |
| Ed Poole | 1 | 0 | 0 | 0 | 1.13 | 2 |

== Awards and honors ==
=== League top five finishers ===
Ginger Beaumont

- NL leader in batting average (.357)
- #3 in NL in runs scored (100)
- #3 in NL in on-base percentage (.404)
- #4 in NL in stolen bases (33)

Jack Chesbro

- NL leader in wins (28)

Fred Clarke

- #2 in NL in runs scored (103)
- #3 in NL in slugging percentage (.449)
- #4 in NL in on-base percentage (.401)

Tommy Leach

- NL leader in home runs (6)
- #2 in NL in RBI (85)
- #4 in NL in runs scored (97)

Jesse Tannehill

- #3 in NL in ERA (1.95)

Honus Wagner

- NL leader in RBI (91)
- NL leader in runs scored (105)
- NL leader in stolen bases (42)
- NL leader in slugging percentage (.463)
