= Dad Hale =

American baseball player (1880-1946)

- Pitcher
- Born: February 18, 1880; Allegan, Michigan, U.S.
- Died: February 1, 1946 (aged 65); Allegan, Michigan, U.S.
- Batted: Right Threw: Right

MLB debut
- April 21, 1902, for the Boston Beaneaters

Last MLB appearance
- August 16, 1902, for the Baltimore Orioles

MLB statistics
- Win–loss record: 1-4
- Earned run average: 5.67
- Strikeouts: 17
- Stats at Baseball Reference

Teams
- Boston Beaneaters (1902); Baltimore Orioles (1902)

Ray Luther "Dad" Hale (February 18, 1880 – February 1, 1946) was an American Major League Baseball pitcher. Hale played for the Boston Beaneaters and the Baltimore Orioles in 1902. In 11 career games, he had a 1–4 record, with 7 games started and a 5.67 ERA.

Hale was born and died in Allegan, Michigan.
