= Jacob Fox (baseball) =

American baseball player (1879-1947)

- Pitcher
- Born: September 27, 1879; Scranton, Pennsylvania
- Died: August 21, 1947 (aged 67); Scranton, Pennsylvania
- Batted: Right Threw: Right

MLB debut
- September 4, 1902, for the Philadelphia Phillies

Last MLB appearance
- September 4, 1902, for the Philadelphia Phillies

MLB statistics
- Games pitched: 1
- Strikeouts: 1
- Earned run average: 18.00

Teams
- Philadelphia Phillies (1902)

Jacob Fox (born Henry Fuchs; September 27, 1879 – August 21, 1947) was a Major League Baseball pitcher.

Fox played for the Philadelphia Phillies in the 1902 season. In one career game, he had a 0-0 record with an 18.00 ERA, with 1 save.

Fox was born and died in Scranton, Pennsylvania.
