= Bob Dresser =

American baseball player (1878-1924)

- Pitcher
- Born: October 4, 1878; Newton, Massachusetts, U.S.
- Died: July 27, 1924 (aged 45); Duxbury, Massachusetts, U.S.
- Batted: Left Threw: Left

MLB debut
- August 13, 1902, for the Boston Beaneaters

Last MLB appearance
- August 13, 1902, for the Boston Beaneaters

MLB statistics
- Win–loss record: 0-1
- Earned run average: 3.00
- Strikeouts: 8
- Stats at Baseball Reference

Teams
- Boston Beaneaters (1902)

Robert Nicholson Dresser (October 4, 1878 – July 27, 1924) was an American Major League Baseball pitcher. He played for the Boston Beaneaters of the National League in one game on August 13, 1902. As the Beaneaters had a double header that day, Dresser, a left-hander, started one of the games against the Pittsburgh Pirates. He pitched a complete game in his only major league appearance, losing to the Pirates 6–1. Although Dresser gave up six runs on 12 hits, only three of the runs against him were earned. He also struck out eight batters and issued no walks in his lone performance on the mound at the major league level. At the plate, Dresser also doubled for his lone major league hit, going 1–4 in the game.
