= Bill Clay (baseball) =

American baseball player (1874–1917)

- Outfielder
- Born: November 23, 1874; Baltimore, Maryland, U.S.
- Died: October 12, 1917 (aged 42); York, Pennsylvania, U.S.
- Batted: Unknown Threw: Right

MLB debut
- August 8, 1902, for the Philadelphia Phillies

Last MLB appearance
- August 12, 1902, for the Philadelphia Phillies

MLB statistics
- At bats: 8
- RBI: 1
- Batting average: .250
- Stats at Baseball Reference

Teams
- Philadelphia Phillies (1902)

Frederick C. Clay (November 23, 1874 – October 12, 1917) was an American professional baseball player who played in three games for the Philadelphia Phillies in 1902. He scored one run and recorded one RBI on two hits compiling a career .250 batting average. He was born in Baltimore, Maryland and died at the age of 42 in York, Pennsylvania.

He began his professional career with the Meridian Silverites of the Connecticut State League in 1900. His best year in the minors was 1905, when he had a batting average of .384 in 111 games with two teams. After his appearance in the Major Leagues, he continued to play minor league baseball. His last year in the minors was 1915 with the Chambersburg Maroons, Gettysburg Patriots, Fitchburg Burghers and Worcester Busters.
