= Mike Hopkins (baseball) =

Scottish baseball player (1872–1952)

- Catcher
- Born: November 1, 1872; Glasgow, Scotland
- Died: February 5, 1952 (aged 79); Pittsburgh, Pennsylvania, U.S.
- Batted: Right Threw: Right

MLB debut
- August 24, 1902, for the Pittsburgh Pirates

Last MLB appearance
- August 24, 1902, for the Pittsburgh Pirates

MLB statistics
- Batting average: 1.000
- Home runs: 0
- Runs batted in: 0
- Stats at Baseball Reference

Teams
- Pittsburgh Pirates (1902)

Michael Joseph Hopkins (November 1, 1872 – February 5, 1952) was a Scottish-American professional baseball player, who played in one major-league game, for the 1902 Pittsburgh Pirates.

== Biography ==
Hopkins was born in 1872 in Glasgow, Scotland. Nicknamed "Skinner", he is one of only 10 players in major-league history to be a Scottish native.

Hopkins played in one game for the Pittsburgh Pirates. As catcher on August 24, 1902, he handled four chances flawlessly for a fielding percentage of 1.000; he also had one passed ball. At the plate, he went 2-for-2 with a double for a 1.000 batting average and a 1.500 slugging percentage. The game was part of a doubleheader against the Cincinnati Reds, played at the Palace of the Fans in Cincinnati.

Some of his teammates on the pennant-winning 1902 Pirates team were Hall of Famers Jack Chesbro, Fred Clarke, and Honus Wagner.

Outside of baseball, Hopkins worked for the Pennsylvania Railroad. He died in 1952 in Pittsburgh.
