= Ham Iburg =

American baseball player (1873-1945)

- Pitcher
- Born: October 30, 1873; San Francisco, California, U.S.
- Died: February 11, 1945 (aged 71); San Francisco, California, U.S.
- Batted: Right Threw: Right

MLB debut
- April 17, 1902, for the Philadelphia Phillies

Last MLB appearance
- October 3, 1902, for the Philadelphia Phillies

MLB statistics
- Win–loss record: 11–18
- Earned run average: 3.89
- Strikeouts: 106
- Stats at Baseball Reference

Teams
- Philadelphia Phillies (1902)

Herman Edward Iburg (October 30, 1873 – February 11, 1945) was an American pitcher in Major League Baseball with the Philadelphia Phillies. He stood at 5' 11", weighed 165 lbs., and batted and threw right-handed.

== Career ==
Iburg was born in San Francisco, California. He started his professional baseball career in 1896 with the California League's San Francisco Metropolitans. Over the next few years, he played with various teams in the California League and Pacific Coast League. Iburg was once told that he could name his salary if he joined a team in the Montana League, but he refused to leave the west coast.

In 1901, Iburg broke out while playing for the San Francisco Wasps. He went 37–27 that season and led the California League in wins and games pitched. That performance earned him a spot on the Philadelphia Phillies starting rotation in 1902. Iburg pitched 236 innings as an MLB rookie and went 11–18 with a 3.89 earned run average. He allowed the third-most earned runs in the National League.

After the season, Iburg went back west because he "simply preferred life on the Pacific Coast to life in the eastern major league cities." 1902 was his only season in the majors, and he set a modern NL record for most losses by a pitcher in his lone MLB season. He was long the all-time MLB leader in wins for pitchers who have a last name starting with the letter "I" (since 1900), but that record was surpassed in 1996 by Jason Isringhausen.

Iburg continued his heavy workload in the Pacific Coast League. He pitched over 420 innings in 1903, 1904, and 1905, and he won over 20 games each year, as well. In 1905, he went 22–26 with a career-low 2.04 ERA. That was his last season in professional baseball.

Iburg died in San Francisco at the age of 71.
