= Pat Deisel =

American baseball player (1876–1948)

- Catcher
- Born: April 29, 1876; Ripley, Ohio
- Died: April 17, 1948 (aged 71); Cincinnati, Ohio
- Batted: Right Threw: Right

MLB debut
- August 21, 1902, for the Brooklyn Superbas

Last MLB appearance
- September 19, 1903, for the Cincinnati Reds

MLB statistics
- Batting average: .667
- Home runs: 0
- Runs batted in: 1
- Stats at Baseball Reference

Teams
- Brooklyn Superbas (1902); Cincinnati Reds (1903)

Edward "Pat" Deisel (April 29, 1876 – April 17, 1948) was a professional baseball player who played catcher for the 1902 Brooklyn Superbas and the 1903 Cincinnati Reds. He appeared in a total of three games in the major leagues during his short career.
