= Joe Berry (catcher) =

American baseball player (1872-1961)

- Catcher
- Born: September 10, 1872; Wheeling, West Virginia, U.S.
- Died: March 13, 1961 (aged 88); Allenwood, New Jersey, U.S.
- Batted: Switch Threw: Right

MLB debut
- September 4, 1902, for the Philadelphia Phillies

Last MLB appearance
- September 4, 1902, for the Philadelphia Phillies

MLB statistics
- Batting average: .250
- Stats at Baseball Reference

Teams
- Philadelphia Phillies (1902)

Joseph Howard Berry, Sr. (September 20, 1872 – March 13, 1961) was an American professional baseball player who appeared in one Major League Baseball game with the Philadelphia Phillies in 1902. He was a switch hitter and threw right-handed.

Berry's son, Joseph Howard Berry, Jr., had a brief career with the New York Giants from 1921 to 1922.
