= Sammy Curran (baseball) =

American baseball player

- Pitcher
- Born: October 30, 1874; Dorchester, Massachusetts, U.S.
- Died: May 19, 1936 (aged 61); Dorchester, Massachusetts, U.S.
- Batted: Unknown Threw: Left

MLB debut
- August 1, 1902, for the Boston Nationals

Last MLB appearance
- August 1, 1902, for the Boston Nationals

MLB statistics
- Win–loss record: 0–0
- Earned run average: 1.35
- Strikeouts: 3
- Stats at Baseball Reference

Teams
- Boston Nationals (1902)

Simon "Sammy" Francis Curran (October 30, 1874 – May 19, 1936) was an American left-handed, Major League Baseball pitcher during the dead-ball era. He played for the Boston Nationals of the National League for one game on August 1, 1902, at the South End Grounds in Boston against the Chicago Orphans in a relief appearance, replacing Mal Eason. Curran faced 25 batters, struck out three, gave up one earned run on six hits, no walks in 6 2/3 innings for a no decision and an ERA of 1.35. In addition Curran had two plate appearances with no hits including a strikeout, thus ending his career with a .000 batting average.

Curran's professional baseball career also included time in the minor leagues playing for the Manchester Manchesters of the Class F New England League in 1899 and the Norwich Witches of the Class F Connecticut State League in 1901. In total he was recorded as playing 61 games in the minor leagues, winning 12 games and losing nine as a pitcher with Manchester. In addition his batting average was .130 in 1899 and .202 in 1901.

Curran was considered a star baseball player at Tufts University where he graduated in 1896. Tufts was also where he received a medical degree in 1900.

After his baseball career, he was a family physician and served in the Medical Service Corps during World War I, rising to the rank of major.

Curran died May 19, 1936, in Dorchester, Massachusetts and is buried at Holy Cross Cemetery and Mausoleum in Malden, Massachusetts.
