= Tom Maher (baseball) =

American baseball player

- Born: July 6, 1870; Philadelphia, Pennsylvania, U.S.
- Died: August 25, 1929 (aged 59); Philadelphia, Pennsylvania, U.S.
- Batted: Unknown Threw: Unknown

MLB debut
- April 24, 1902, for the Philadelphia Phillies

Last MLB appearance
- April 26, 1902, for the Philadelphia Phillies

MLB statistics
- Games played: 2
- At bats: 2
- Hits: 0
- Stats at Baseball Reference

Teams
- Philadelphia Phillies (1902)

Thomas Francis Maher (July 6, 1870 – August 25, 1929) was an American Major League Baseball player who played in 1902 with the Philadelphia Phillies.

Maher played in 2 games, going 0–1.

He was born and died in Philadelphia, Pennsylvania.
