= Tom Hernon =

American baseball player (1866–1902)

- Outfielder
- Born: November 4, 1866; East Bridgewater, Massachusetts, U.S.
- Died: February 4, 1902 (aged 35); New Bedford, Massachusetts, U.S.
- Batted: Right Threw: Right

MLB debut
- September 13, 1897, for the Chicago Colts

Last MLB appearance
- September 15, 1897, for the Chicago Colts

MLB statistics
- Batting average: .063
- Home runs: 0
- Runs batted in: 2
- Stats at Baseball Reference

Teams
- Chicago Colts (1897)

Thomas H. Hernon (November 4, 1866 – February 4, 1902) was an American professional baseball player. He played part of one season in Major League Baseball for the Chicago Colts (now known as the Cubs) in 1897. He was a right-handed batter and a right-handed thrower. He was 5'7½ feet tall and weighed 156 pounds.

Hernon was born in East Bridgewater, Massachusetts, and died in New Bedford, Massachusetts. He is buried in St. Mary Cemetery in New Bedford.
