= Harry Felix =

American baseball player (1875-1961)

- Pitcher / Third baseman
- Born: July 16, 1875; Brooklyn, New York, U.S.
- Died: October 17, 1961 (aged 86); Miami, Florida, U.S.
- Batted: Right Threw: Right

MLB debut
- October 5, 1901, for the New York Giants

Last MLB appearance
- July 24, 1902, for the Philadelphia Phillies

MLB statistics
- Batting average: .135
- Fielding percentage: .883
- Win–loss record: 1–3
- Earned run average: 5.60
- Stats at Baseball Reference

Teams
- New York Giants (1901); Philadelphia Phillies (1902)

Harry Francis Felix (July 16, 1875 – October 17, 1961) was an American right-handed pitcher in Major League Baseball during the 1901 and 1902 seasons. Felix made his debut for the New York Giants on October 5, 1901, pitching two innings at the end of a game against the Brooklyn Superbas. The following season, he pitched for the Philadelphia Phillies, starting on Opening Day and compiling a record of 1–3 in nine games, allowing 28 earned runs in 45 innings pitched. Felix also played in seven games at third base for the Phillies, compiling a batting average of .135 and a fielding percentage of .774 over his 16 games played. Felix played his last game on July 24, 1902, and died on October 17, 1961, in Miami, Florida.
