= Ed Gremminger =

American baseball player (1874–1942)

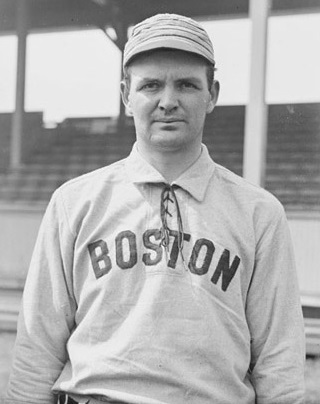
- Third baseman
- Born: March 30, 1874; Canton, Ohio, U.S.
- Died: May 26, 1942 (aged 68); Canton, Ohio, U.S.
- Batted: Right Threw: Right

MLB debut
- April 21, 1895, for the Cleveland Spiders

Last MLB appearance
- July 30, 1904, for the Detroit Tigers

MLB statistics
- Batting average: .251
- Home runs: 7
- Hits: 356
- Stats at Baseball Reference

Teams
- Cleveland Spiders (1895); Boston Beaneaters (1902–1903); Detroit Tigers (1904)

Lorenzo Edward Gremminger (March 30, 1874 – May 26, 1942), nicknamed "Battleship", was an American baseball infielder.

A native of Canton, Ohio, Gremminger played professional baseball player from 1895 to 1912, including four seasons of Major League Baseball as a third baseman for the Cleveland Spiders (1895), Boston Beaneaters (1902–1903), and Detroit Tigers (1904). While playing for Boston, he led the National League's third basemen in putouts in 1902 and 1903, in fielding percentage in 1902, in assists in 1903, and in double plays turned in 1903.

== Early life ==
Gremminger was born on March 30, 1874, in Canton, Ohio, to Michael M. Gremminger and Sarah Jean (nee Killian) Gremminger.

== Professional baseball ==
Gremminger began playing professional baseball in 1895 for the Cleveland Spiders. He made his major league debut at age 21 on April 21, 1895. He appeared in 20 games for the Spiders, all at third base, and compiled a .269 batting average with 15 RBIs in 78 at bats.

After his brief stint with the Spiders, Gremminger spent the next six years in the minor leagues with the Oil City Oilers of the Iron and Oil League (1895) and the Buffalo Bisons (1896–1899) and Rochester Bronchos (1900-1901), both of the Eastern League. In 1901, his batting average increased dramatically to .343 with a slugging percentage of .529.

On December 11, 1901, the Boston Beaneaters purchased Gremminger from Rochester, giving him a second shot at the major leagues. He appeared in 140 games as the starting third baseman for the 1902 Boston Beaneaters, compiling a .257 batting average with a .314 on-base percentage and .347 slugging percentage. His 65 RBIs ranked eighth in the National League, and his 33 extra-base hits ranked ninth. Defensively, he led the National League's third basemen with 222 putouts and a 951 fielding percentage and ranked third with 282 assists.

Gremminger returned to the Beaneaters in 1903 and again appeared in 140 games. He hit .264 with a .313 on-base percentage and .376 slugging percentage. His 56 strikeouts ranked fourth in the National League. Defensively, he led the National League's third basemen in putouts (217), assists (300), and double plays turned (20). His .935 fielding percentage ranked third among the league's third basemen.

On February 24, 1904, the Detroit Tigers purchased Gremminger from the Beaneaters. He appeared in 83 games at third base for the 1904 Tigers. His batting average dropped by 50 points to .214 in 309 at bats. He appeared in his last major league game on July 30, 1904. He was replaced at third base by Bill Coughlin who was acquired by the Tigers in late July.

In 383 major league games, Gremminger compiled a .251 batting average, .301 on-base percentage, and .340 slugging percentage, with 164 RBIs and 89 extra-base hits.

In August 1904, the Tigers sold Gremminger to the Minneapolis Millers of the American Association in exchange for cash and Minneapolis' "best player" at the end of the season. Gremminger continued playing in the minor leagues until 1912, including stints with the Millers (1904–1907), Montgomery Senators (1908–1910), and Canton Deubers/Statesman (1911–1912).

== Later years ==
Gremminger died in 1942 in Canton, Ohio.
