= Pat Carney (baseball) =

American baseball player (1876–1953)

- Right fielder
- Born: August 7, 1876; Holyoke, Massachusetts, U.S.
- Died: January 9, 1953 (aged 76); Worcester, Massachusetts, U.S.
- Batted: Left Threw: Left

MLB debut
- September 20, 1901, for the Boston Beaneaters

Last MLB appearance
- August 17, 1904, for the Boston Beaneaters

MLB statistics
- Batting average: .247
- Home runs: 3
- Runs batted in: 131
- Stats at Baseball Reference

Teams
- Boston Beaneaters (1901–04)

Patrick Joseph "Doc" Carney (August 7, 1876 – January 9, 1953 in Worcester, Massachusetts) was an American professional baseball player. He played all or part of four seasons in Major League Baseball, from 1901 until 1904, for the Boston Beaneaters, primarily as an outfielder. Carney also pitched for the Beaneaters, pitching in 16 games in 1902, 1903 and 1904, compiling a 4–10 record with an ERA of 4.69.

After his major league career, Carney went on to coach baseball at his alma mater, the College of the Holy Cross, from 1906 until 1909. He also became a general practice medical doctor and practiced in Worcester, Massachusetts.
