= Roy Thomas (outfielder) =

American baseball player (1874–1959)

- Center fielder
- Born: March 24, 1874; Norristown, Pennsylvania, U.S.
- Died: November 20, 1959 (aged 85); Norristown, Pennsylvania, U.S.
- Batted: Left Threw: Left

MLB debut
- April 14, 1899, for the Philadelphia Phillies

Last MLB appearance
- September 4, 1911, for the Philadelphia Phillies

MLB statistics
- Batting average: .290
- Home runs: 7
- Runs batted in: 299
- Stats at Baseball Reference

Teams
- Philadelphia Phillies (1899–1908); Pittsburgh Pirates (1908); Boston Doves (1909); Philadelphia Phillies (1910–1911)

Roy Allen Thomas (March 24, 1874 – November 20, 1959) was an American center fielder in Major League Baseball. From 1899 through 1911, he played for the Philadelphia Phillies (1899–1908, 1910–1911), Pittsburgh Pirates (1908) and Boston Doves (1909). Thomas batted and threw left-handed. He was born in Norristown, Pennsylvania, and graduated from the University of Pennsylvania. Thomas was the brother of fellow Major Leaguer, Bill Thomas.

According to baseball analyst Bill James, Thomas is the only major league regular to have scored three times as many runs as he drove in. In 1470 games played, Thomas compiled 1011 runs scored and 299 runs batted in, as he posted a .290 batting average with a .413 on-base average and 244 stolen bases.

During his 13-season career, Thomas was one of the most productive table-setters in the National League. His relentless patience at the plate infuriated opposing pitchers (At one point, even being punched by Bill Phillips) and prompted the NL to change its rule regarding foul balls in 1901. The new rule also was adopted by the American League two years later. He is, in fact, reported by James to hold the unofficial consecutive foul-ball record – 22, in one plate appearance.

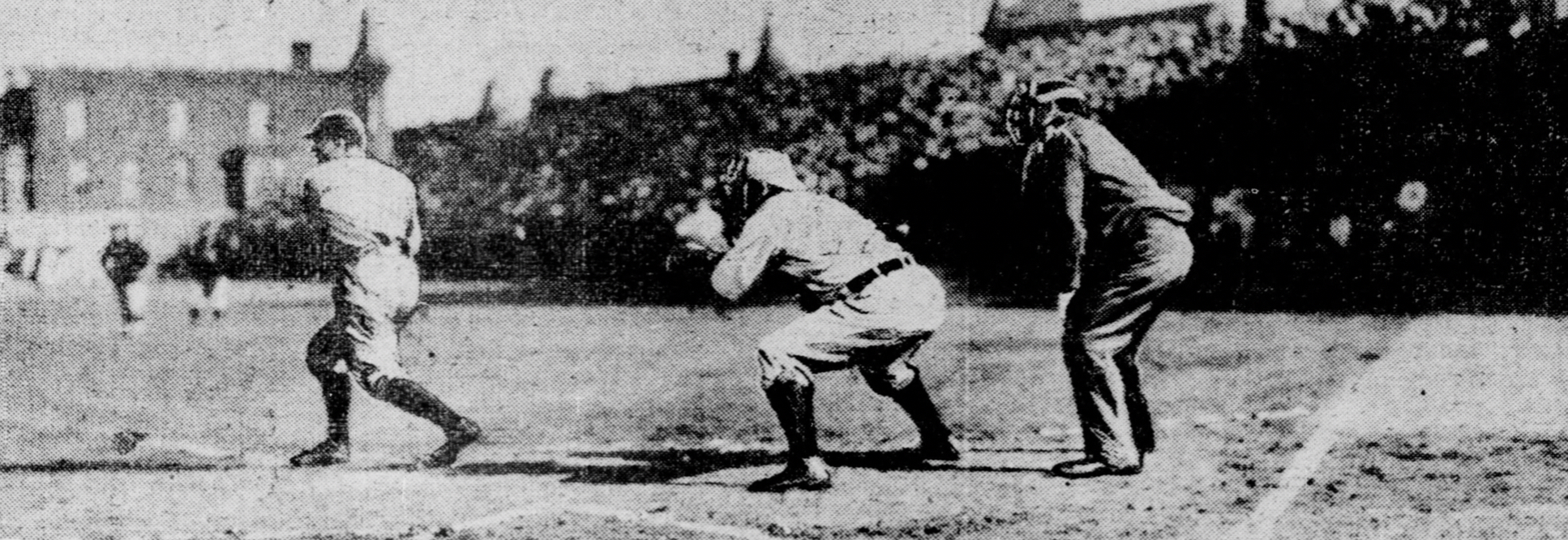
Roy Thomas, Philadelphia Phillies, bats against Philadelphia Athletics at Columbia Park on April 4, 1904

Thomas batted .325 in his rookie year with a .457 OBP via 115 walks, immediately establishing himself as the Philadelphia Phillies' leadoff hitter and center fielder. At the time foul balls were not counted as strikes, and Thomas, who became adept at fouling off good pitches, worked an astonishing number of 230 walks in his first two seasons. Ironically the rule-change had little effect on Thomas. After the new rule went into effect, he led the NL in walks six out of the next seven seasons (1901–04, 1906–07).

Thomas was sent to the Pittsburgh Pirates in the 1908 midseason. He also played for the Boston Doves in 1909, returning to the Phillies for the 1910–11 seasons. At his retirement, he held career fielding records for center fielders in putouts (NL) and fielding average (MLB). Thomas left a playing record that has endured. He ranks 20th all-time in walk percentage (.164), 29th all-time in on-base percentage (.412) and 84th all-time in walks (1,042).

Thomas became a coach with the University of Pennsylvania baseball team in 1909, and continued playing in the majors while coaching for three seasons. From 1909 to 1919, he compiled a record of 106–43–3 for a .632 winning percentage, comparable to the best college coaches of all time.

Thomas died in Norristown, Pennsylvania, at age 85, and was buried in the nearby Riverside Cemetery.

== See also ==
- List of Major League Baseball career stolen bases leaders
- List of Major League Baseball annual runs scored leaders
- List of St. Louis Cardinals coaches
