= Bill Miller (outfielder) =

German-American baseball player (1879–1957)

- Outfielder
- Born: May 23, 1879; Bad Schwalbach, Germany
- Died: September 8, 1957 (aged 78); Ashtabula, Ohio
- Batted: Left Threw: Left

MLB debut
- August 23, 1902, for the Pittsburgh Pirates

Last MLB appearance
- August 23, 1902, for the Pittsburgh Pirates

MLB statistics
- Batting average: .200
- Home runs: 0
- Runs batted in: 2
- Stats at Baseball Reference

Teams
- Pittsburgh Pirates (1902)

William Alexander Miller (May 23, 1879 – September 8, 1957) was a professional baseball player. He played in one game in Major League Baseball for the Pittsburgh Pirates as a right fielder.
