= Rube Ward =

American baseball player

- Outfielder
- Born: February 6, 1879; New Lexington, Ohio, U.S.
- Died: January 17, 1945 (aged 65); Akron, Ohio, U.S.
- Batted: Unknown Threw: Unknown

MLB debut
- April 28, 1902, for the Brooklyn Superbas

Last MLB appearance
- August 14, 1902, for the Brooklyn Superbas

MLB statistics
- Batting average: .290
- Home runs: 0
- Runs batted in: 2
- Stats at Baseball Reference

Teams
- Brooklyn Superbas (1902)

John Andrew Ward (February 6, 1879 – January 17, 1945) was an American professional baseball player who played 13 games in the outfield for the 1902 Brooklyn Superbas.
