= Kelvin, Arizona =

Unincorporated community in the state of Arizona, United States

- Unincorporated community
- Location within Arizona Location within the United States
- Coordinates: 33°06′41″N 110°58′24″W
- Country: United States
- State: Arizona
- County: Pinal
- Elevation: 1,831 ft (558 m)
- Time zone: UTC-7 (Mountain (MST))
- Area code: 520
- GNIS feature ID: 24477

Kelvin is an unincorporated community in Pinal County, Arizona, United States. Kelvin is located near the Gila River, 24.6 miles (39.6 km) east-northeast of Florence.

The community was founded on the north side of the Gila River across from the Riverside Stage Stop that sat on the south side of the Gila, where the town of Riverside still exists. The town was named Kelvin, after Kelvin Grove in Scotland, in 1900. The railroad company later founded Ray Junction immediately north of the Kelvin Bridge on account of the development of Ray, Arizona, and it was the place where the railroad branched from the main line of the Arizona Eastern Railway heading up to the Ray mine. The post office and original old west town site retained the name of Kelvin. This group of small communities are all located within a two-mile circumference from each other and many of the old foundations of Kelvin's original town site still exist. The ruins of the massive mill are still plainly visible. The ruins of the adobe post office are still partly standing near the junction of the Florence / Kelvin Highway and Ray Road.

The Kelvin Bridge and the Mineral Creek Bridge, which are listed on the National Register of Historic Places, are located near Kelvin.
