= Lefty Weinert =

American baseball player (1902–1973)

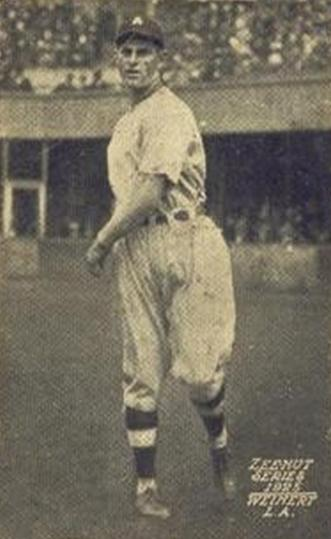
- Pitcher
- Born: April 21, 1902; Philadelphia, Pennsylvania, U.S.
- Died: April 17, 1973 (aged 70); Rockledge, Florida, U.S.
- Batted: Left Threw: Left

MLB debut
- September 24, 1919, for the Philadelphia Phillies

Last MLB appearance
- June 29, 1931, for the New York Yankees

MLB statistics
- Win–loss record: 18–33
- Earned run average: 4.59
- Strikeouts: 160
- Stats at Baseball Reference

Teams
- Philadelphia Phillies (1919–1924); Chicago Cubs (1927–1928); New York Yankees (1931)

Philip Walter "Lefty" Weinert (April 21, 1902 – April 17, 1973) was an American Major League Baseball pitcher who played from 1919 to 1931 with three teams. In 1929 he tied for 6th in wins and 4th in won-loss percentage (.692) in the Southern Association, as he was 18–8 with a 3.00 ERA for the Memphis Chickasaws. He batted and threw left-handed. Weinert was born in Philadelphia, Pennsylvania, and died in Rockledge, Florida, and was Jewish.
