= Frank Watt (baseball) =

American baseball player (1902-1956)

- Pitcher
- Born: December 15, 1902; Washington, D.C., U.S.
- Died: August 31, 1956 (aged 53); Washington, D.C., U.S.
- Batted: Right Threw: Right

MLB debut
- April 14, 1931, for the Philadelphia Phillies

Last MLB appearance
- September 27, 1931, for the Philadelphia Phillies

MLB statistics
- Win–loss record: 5-5
- Earned run average: 4.84
- Strikeouts: 25
- Stats at Baseball Reference

Teams
- Philadelphia Phillies (1931)

Frank Marion Watt (December 15, 1902 - August 31, 1956), nicknamed "Kilo", was an American professional baseball pitcher. Watt played for the Philadelphia Phillies in 1931. In 38 career games, he had a 5-5 record with a 4.84 ERA. He batted and threw right-handed.

He was the brother of fellow Major League players, Allie Watt.

Watt was born and died in Washington, D.C.
