= Bill Wolff (baseball) =

American baseball player (1876-1943)

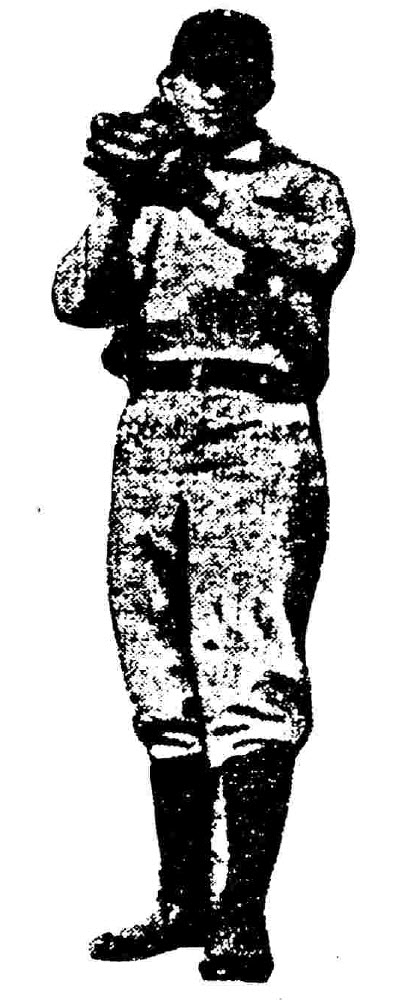
- Pitcher
- Born: January 14, 1876; Tremont, Pennsylvania
- Died: November 7, 1943 (aged 67); Philadelphia, Pennsylvania
- Batted: Unknown Threw: Unknown

MLB debut
- September 10, 1902, for the Philadelphia Phillies

Last MLB appearance
- September 10, 1902, for the Philadelphia Phillies

MLB statistics
- Win–loss record: 0-1
- Strikeouts: 3
- Earned run average: 4.00
- Stats at Baseball Reference

Teams
- Philadelphia Phillies (1902)

William Franklyn Wolff (January 14, 1876 – November 7, 1943), was a professional baseball pitcher. He pitched in one game in Major League Baseball for the Philadelphia Phillies of the National League on September 10, 1902.
