= 1902 in baseball =

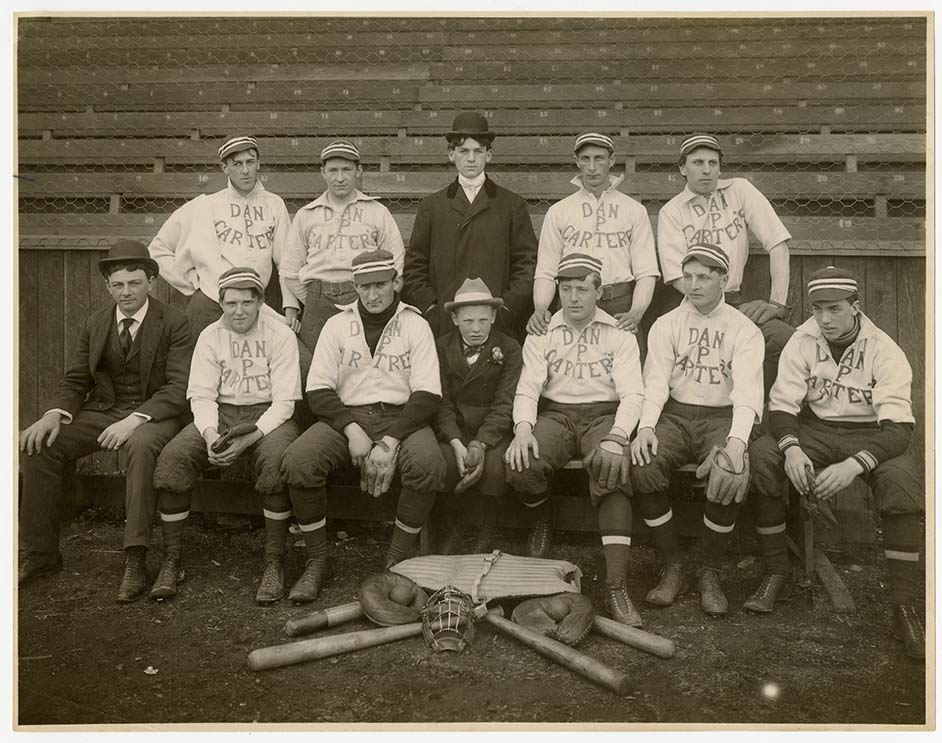

The following are the baseball events of the year 1902 throughout the world.

== Champions ==
=== Major League Baseball ===
- American League: Philadelphia Athletics
- National League: Pittsburgh Pirates

== Statistical leaders ==
Any team shown in small text indicates a previous team a player was on during the season.

	American League		National League	
Stat	Player	Total	Player	Total
AVG	Nap Lajoie (CLE/PHA)	.378	Ginger Beaumont (PIT)	.357
HR	Socks Seybold (PHA)	16	Tommy Leach (PIT)	6
RBI	Buck Freeman (BOS)	121	Honus Wagner (PIT)	91
W	Cy Young (BOS)	32	Jack Chesbro (PIT)	28
ERA	Ed Siever (DET)	1.91	Jack Taylor (CHC)	1.29
K	Rube Waddell (PHA)	210	Vic Willis (BSN)	225

== Major league baseball final standings ==
=== American League final standings ===
American League
Team	W	L	Pct.	GB	Home	Road
Philadelphia Athletics	83	53	.610	—	56‍–‍17	27‍–‍36
St. Louis Browns	78	58	.574	5	49‍–‍21	29‍–‍37
Boston Americans	77	60	.562	6½	43‍–‍27	34‍–‍33
Chicago White Stockings	74	60	.552	8	48‍–‍20	26‍–‍40
Cleveland Bronchos	69	67	.507	14	40‍–‍25	29‍–‍42
Washington Senators	61	75	.449	22	40‍–‍28	21‍–‍47
Detroit Tigers	52	83	.385	30½	34‍–‍33	18‍–‍50
Baltimore Orioles	50	88	.362	34	32‍–‍31	18‍–‍57

Locations of teams for the 1902 American League season
American League

=== National League final standings ===
National League
Team	W	L	Pct.	GB	Home	Road
Pittsburgh Pirates	103	36	.741	—	56‍–‍15	47‍–‍21
Brooklyn Superbas	75	63	.543	27½	45‍–‍23	30‍–‍40
Boston Beaneaters	73	64	.533	29	42‍–‍27	31‍–‍37
Cincinnati Reds	70	70	.500	33½	35‍–‍35	35‍–‍35
Chicago Orphans	68	69	.496	34	31‍–‍38	37‍–‍31
St. Louis Cardinals	56	78	.418	44½	28‍–‍38	28‍–‍40
Philadelphia Phillies	56	81	.409	46	29‍–‍39	27‍–‍42
New York Giants	48	88	.353	53½	24‍–‍44	24‍–‍44

Locations of teams for the 1902 National League season
National League

== Events ==
=== January–March ===
- March 12 – Mike Donlin of the Baltimore Orioles is arrested for assault. Donlin will plead guilty and serve a 6-month jail sentence.

=== April ===
- April 19 – Bob Ewing of the Cincinnati Reds, in his Major League debut, ties a National League record by walking 7 batters in one inning.
- April 26 – Addie Joss of the Cleveland Bronchos throws a one-hitter in his Major League debut.

=== May ===
- May 13 – All nine players for the Cincinnati Reds collect at least 2 hits in a 24–2 thrashing of the Philadelphia Phillies.
- May 16 – Dummy Hoy of the Cincinnati Reds bats against Dummy Taylor of the New York Giants in the first inning. It is the first time that two deaf-mutes have faced one another.
- May 24 – Bill Bradley of the Cleveland Bronchos sets an American league record by homering in his fourth consecutive game, a record not matched until Babe Ruth does it on June 25, 1918.
- May 30 – Roger Bresnahan of the Baltimore Orioles hits 2 inside-the-park home runs against the Cleveland Bronchos.

=== June ===
- June 2 – The Cleveland Bronchos commit 6 errors in one inning against the Baltimore Orioles. It will be the most errors by a team in one inning for the entire 20th century.
- June 3 – Mike O'Neill of the St. Louis Cardinals connects for the first ever pinch-hit grand slam home run.
- June 15 – Future major leaguer Nig Clarke goes 8–8, all home runs, as his Corsicana team blasts Texarkana 51–3 in a Texas League game. Corsicana collects 53 hits, including 21 homers, in playing the game in a park where right field is only 210' from home plate.
- June 30 – The Cleveland Bronchos becomes the first American League team to hit three consecutive home runs in one inning, as Nap Lajoie, Charlie Hickman and Bill Bradley connect in the sixth off St. Louis Browns pitcher Jack Harper, with all the homers landing in the left field bleachers at St. Louis. The last two come on the first pitch thrown, while Cleveland wins the game 17–2. The feat was last done in the National League on May 10, 1894.

=== July ===
- July 1 – Rube Waddell of the Philadelphia Athletics faces the minimum 27 batters in pitching a two-hit shutout against the Baltimore Orioles. Waddell strikes out the side three times in the game, once on nine pitches. Billy Gilbert, Harry Howell and Jack Cronin are the strikeout victims in all three innings.
- July 8 – John McGraw signs a contract to become the manager of the New York Giants. McGraw will remain as the Giants manager for the next 30 years, winning ten National League pennants and three World Series.
- July 8 – In his first game for the Philadelphia Athletics, Danny Murphy arrives late in the second inning and is immediately put in the game. He proceeds to go 6-for-6 at the plate, which includes a grand slam off of Cy Young, and handles 12 chances without committing an error at second base.
- July 17 – The Baltimore Orioles, due to an exodus of players to the Giants, are left with only five available players for a game against the St. Louis Browns. The Orioles are forced to forfeit the contest, and the American League takes control of the team for the remainder of the season; the Orioles ultimately fold after the season.
- July 25 – At West Side Park, Cincinnati Reds outfielder Cy Seymour sets a major-league record by hitting four sacrifice flies in a 6–1 victory over the Chicago Orphans. Seymour will be tied but never topped.

=== August ===
- August 13 – Harry Davis of the Philadelphia Athletics steals second base with teammate Dave Fultz on third in an attempt to score Fultz. When he draws no throw, Davis then steals back to first base on the next pitch. He then steals second again, this time drawing the throw, scoring Fultz.
- August 14 – Tommy Leach of the Pittsburgh Pirates hit only 63 home runs over the fence in a career of over 2,100 games. On this day, however, he does it twice against the Boston Beaneaters. Leach will go on to win the National League home run crown in 1902 with 6.
- August 18 – Hal O'Hagan, of the Rochester Broncos, turns professional baseball's first unassisted triple play against Jersey City in a minor league game.
- August 19 – Kip Selbach of the Baltimore Orioles ties a record by committing 5 errors from the outfield in one game.

=== September ===
- September 1 – The Chicago Cubs famed trio of Joe Tinker, Johnny Evers and Frank Chance appear in the team's lineup for the first time together.
- September 10 – Rube Waddell of the Philadelphia Athletics, making only six relief appearance all season, starts twice in a double-header against the Baltimore Orioles and gets the victory in both games.
- September 20 – Nixey Callahan of the Chicago White Sox pitches the first no-hitter in franchise history as he defeats the Detroit Tigers 2–0.

=== October–December ===
- October 2 – The Boston Beaneaters defeat the New York Giants 2–1 in 14 innings. The game produces 8 runners thrown out attempting to steal, 3 pick-offs, 3 double-plays and 2 runners thrown out at the plate.

== Births ==
=== January ===
- January 2 – Nick Dumovich
- January 2 – Ray Jacobs
- January 3 – Jim McLaughlin
- January 4 – Ted Odenwald
- January 6 – Bob Barnes
- January 7 – Cliff Knox
- January 7 – Al Todd
- January 14 – Smead Jolley
- January 16 – Joe Connell
- January 16 – Pip Koehler
- January 26 – Johnny Frederick
- January 27 – Ollie Tucker
- January 28 – Pat Crawford
- January 28 – Jackie Gallagher
- January 29 – Elmer Eggert

=== February ===
- February 9 – Don Hankins
- February 9 – Julie Wera
- February 12 – Kiddo Davis
- February 27 – Roy Hutson

=== March ===
- March 2 – Moe Berg
- March 4 – Emmett McCann
- March 15 – Fred Bennett
- March 16 – Jake Flowers
- March 18 – Squire Potter
- March 23 – Johnny Moore

=== April ===
- April 2 – Bill Yancey
- April 7 – Buck Redfern
- April 8 – Carl Husta
- April 13 – Ben Cantwell
- April 18 – Bob Linton
- April 21 – Lefty Weinert
- April 22 – Ray Benge
- April 26 – Steve Slayton
- April 28 – Red Lucas
- April 30 – Bill Deitrick

=== May ===
- May 2 – Freddy Sale
- May 3 – Ralph Michaels
- May 7 – Sal Gliatto
- May 9 – Wally Dashiell
- May 12 – Dutch Henry
- May 13 – Hal Neubauer
- May 16 – Watty Clark
- May 16 – Howie Fitzgerald
- May 21 – Earl Averill
- May 22 – Dick Jones
- May 22 – Al Simmons
- May 26 – Herb Thomas
- May 30 – Lou McEvoy

=== June ===
- June 5 – Charlie Gooch
- June 6 – Fresco Thompson
- June 9 – Lee Dunham
- June 11 – Ernie Nevers
- June 20 – Wayland Dean
- June 23 – Leon Pettit
- June 24 – Juan Antonio Yanes
- June 25 – Ralph Erickson
- June 30 – Hal Smith

=== July ===
- July 1 – Kent Greenfield
- July 5 – Frank Naleway
- July 7 – Art Merewether
- July 7 – Ted Radcliffe
- July 13 – Bill Lasley
- July 29 – Luther Roy

=== August ===
- August 1 – Howard Freigau
- August 2 – Joe Klinger
- August 3 – Joe Sprinz
- August 3 – Doug Taitt
- August 4 – Homer Blankenship
- August 4 – Bill Hallahan
- August 4 – Al Moore
- August 24 – Jack Blott
- August 24 – Jimmy Hudgens
- August 28 – Art Jacobs
- August 28 – Wally Roettger
- August 30 – Pete Cote

=== September ===
- September 3 – Bill Moore
- September 7 – Cleo Carlyle
- September 8 – Ernie Orsatti
- September 15 – Rap Dixon
- September 15 – Russ Young
- September 19 – Jim Begley
- September 19 – Bruce Connatser
- September 22 – Ollie Marquardt
- September 25 – Pat Malone
- September 28 – Leon Chagnon
- September 30 – Blackie Carter

=== October ===
- October 8 – Paul Schreiber
- October 9 – Kenny Hogan
- October 9 – Jimmy Welsh
- October 10 – Homer Peel
- October 12 – Stew Bolen
- October 15 – Evar Swanson
- October 18 – Charlie Berry
- October 22 – Rusty Yarnall
- October 27 – Jim Keesey

=== November ===
- November 9 – Mike Kelly
- November 11 – Ownie Carroll
- November 14 – Gil Paulsen
- November 15 – Jay Partridge
- November 19 – Joe Palmisano
- November 20 – Augie Prudhomme
- November 24 – Cloy Mattox

=== December ===
- December 1 – Red Badgro
- December 3 – Al Spohrer
- December 4 – Chuck Corgan
- December 12 – Pee-Wee Wanninger
- December 15 – Frank Watt
- December 18 – Les Burke
- December 18 – Joe Buskey
- December 20 – Carl Yowell
- December 23 – Max Rosenfeld
- December 26 – Bill Cronin

== Deaths ==
=== January–March ===
- February 1 – Bill Sharsig, 47, Co-owner, general manager, business manager and on-field manager of the American Association Philadelphia Athletics.
- February 4 – Tom Hernon, 35, outfielder for the 1897 Chicago Colts.
- February 16 – Tom O'Meara, 29, catcher and first baseman of the Cleveland Spiders from 1895 to 1896.
- March 19 – Tom Burns, 44, infielder for the Chicago White Stockings/Colts (1890–1890) and Pittsburgh Pirates, who also managed Pittsburgh (1892) and the Chicago Orphans (1898–1899).
- March 22 – Johnny Ryan, 48, baseball pioneer who played in the early years of the National League for the Philadelphia White Stockings (1873), Baltimore Canaries (1874), New Haven Elm Citys (1875), Louisville Grays (1876) and Cincinnati Reds (1877).
- March 27 – Tom Morrison, 32, infielder/outfielder who played from 1895 through 1896 for the Louisville Colonels.
- March 7 – Pud Galvin, 45, pitcher who amassed record 361 victories, including two no-hitters, primarily with Buffalo and Pittsburgh; career marks in games (697), innings (5941) and shutouts (57) were all records as well.

=== April–June ===
- April 4 – Charlie Sweeney, 38, pitcher the Providence Grays who left to play for the Union Association champs, the St. Louis Maroons. Between the two teams, he had a 41–15 win–loss record. By leaving the Grays, he left them without another starting pitcher, which allowed Charles Radbourn to win 59 games.
- April 5 – Dave Eggler, 52, center fielder for 11 seasons, including five in the short-lived National Association, who batted .272 in 576 career games.
- April 18 – George Grosart, 22, left fielder for the 1901 Boston Beaneaters.
- May 2 – Bill Greenwood, 45, second baseman for five teams from 1882 to 1890.
- June 12 – Tim Donahue, 32, catcher who played from 1891 to 1902 with the Boston Reds, Chicago Colts/Orphans and Washington Senators, hitting .236 in 466 games in part of eight seasons.
- June 23 – John Firth, 47, pitcher who played briefly for the 1884 Richmond Virginians of the American Association.

=== July–September ===
- July 15 – Pat Whitaker, 36, pitcher for the early Baltimore Orioles in 1888 and 1889.
- July 27 – Packy Dillon, catcher for the 1875 St. Louis Red Stockings.
- August 30 – Rome Chambers, 26, pitcher for the 1900 Boston Beaneaters.
- September 23 – George Prentiss, 26, pitcher for the 1901 Boston Americans and 1902 Baltimore Orioles.

=== October–December ===
- November 5 – Daisy Davis, 43, pitcher who posted a 16–21 record in 40 games for the 1884 St. Louis Browns and the 1885 Boston Beaneaters.
- November 18 – Watch Burnham, 42, National League umpire between 1883 and 1885, who called balls and strikes for a no-hitter hurled by Charles Radbourn of the Providence Grays in 1883, and later managed the 1887 Indianapolis Hoosiers.
- December 1 – Fred Dunlap, 43, second baseman who played from 1880 to 1891 for six different teams and managed three of them, who led the National League in doubles in 1880 and the Union Association in batting average, home runs, hits and runs scored during the 1884 season, while leading the St. Louis Maroons to the championship title.
- December 4 – Mike Mansell, 44, left fielder who hit .239 in 371 games for six teams from 1879 to 1884, who led the American Association in doubles and triples during the 1884 season.
- December 11 – Bill Hawke, 32, pitcher who posted a 32–31 record with the St. Louis Browns and Baltimore Orioles National Leagues teams from 1892 to 1894, including a no-hitter against the Washington Senators in 1893.
- December 16 – Frank Buttery, 51, utility who hit a .215 average in 18 games and posted a 3–2 record as a pitcher for the 1872 Middletown Mansfields of the National Association.
