= 1902 Chicago Orphans season =

1902 Chicago Orphans
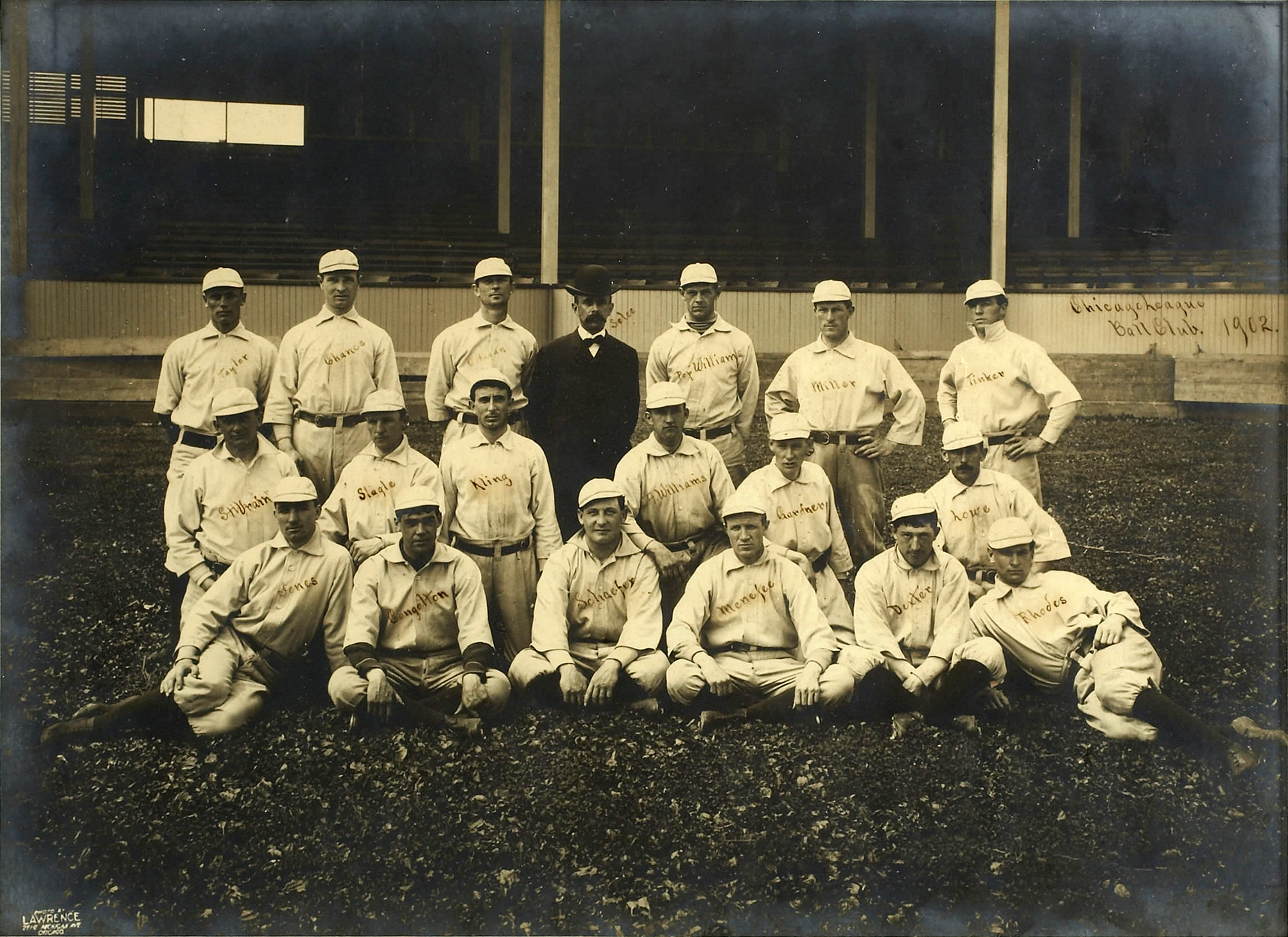
- League: National League
- Ballpark: West Side Park
- City: Chicago
- Record: 68–69 (.496)
- League place: 5th
- Owners: Albert Spalding, James Hart
- Managers: Frank Selee

The 1902 Chicago Orphans season was the 31st season of the Chicago Orphans franchise, the 27th in the National League (NL), and the tenth at West Side Park. The Orphans finished fifth in the National League with a record of 68–69–6 (.496 winning percentage).

== Regular season ==
=== Season standings ===
National League
Team	W	L	Pct.	GB	Home	Road
Pittsburgh Pirates	103	36	.741	—	56‍–‍15	47‍–‍21
Brooklyn Superbas	75	63	.543	27½	45‍–‍23	30‍–‍40
Boston Beaneaters	73	64	.533	29	42‍–‍27	31‍–‍37
Cincinnati Reds	70	70	.500	33½	35‍–‍35	35‍–‍35
Chicago Orphans	68	69	.496	34	31‍–‍38	37‍–‍31
St. Louis Cardinals	56	78	.418	44½	28‍–‍38	28‍–‍40
Philadelphia Phillies	56	81	.409	46	29‍–‍39	27‍–‍42
New York Giants	48	88	.353	53½	24‍–‍44	24‍–‍44

=== Record vs. opponents ===
1902 National League record Sources:
Team	BSN	BRO	CHC	CIN	NYG	PHI	PIT	STL
Boston	—	8–12	11–9	11–9	16–3	11–9–1	6–14–1	10–8–3
Brooklyn	12–8	—	12–8	12–8	10–10	13–6	6–14–1	10–9–2
Chicago	9–11	8–12	—	12–8–1	10–10–4	10–10	7–13	12–5–1
Cincinnati	9–11	8–12	8–12–1	—	14–6	13–7	5–15	13–7
New York	3–16	10–10	10–10–4	6–14	—	6–12	6–13–1	7–13
Philadelphia	9–11–1	6–13	10–10	7–13	12–6	—	2–18	10–10
Pittsburgh	14–6–1	14–6–1	13–7	15–5	13–6–1	18–2	—	16–4
St. Louis	8–10–3	9–10–2	5–12–1	7–13	13–7	10–10	4–16	—

=== Roster ===
1902 Chicago Orphans
Roster
Pitchers: Mal Eason; Jim Gardner; Fred Glade; Alex Hardy; Carl Lundgren; Frank Morrissey; Bob Rhoads; Jim St. Vrain; Jack Taylor; Pop Williams	Catchers: Mike Kahoe; Johnny Kling; Pete Lamer; Infielders: Frank Chance; Dad Clark; Charlie Dexter; Johnny Evers; Ed Glenn; Mike Jacobs; Bobby Lowe; Hal O'Hagan; Germany Schaefer; Sammy Strang; Joe Tinker	Outfielders: Bunk Congalton; John Dobbs; Jack Hendricks; R.E. Hillebrand; Joe Hughes; Davy Jones; Snapper Kennedy; Mike Lynch; Jock Menefee; Dusty Miller; Jim Murray; Chick Pedroes; Larry Schlafly; Jimmy Slagle; Art Williams	Manager: Frank Selee

== Player stats ==
=== Batting ===
==== Starters by position ====
Note: Pos = Position; G = Games played; AB = At bats; H = Hits; Avg. = Batting average; HR = Home runs; RBI = Runs batted in

Pos	Player	G	AB	H	Avg.	HR	RBI
C	Johnny Kling	115	436	126	.289	0	59
1B	Frank Chance	76	242	70	.289	1	31
2B	Bobby Lowe	121	480	119	.248	0	35
SS	Joe Tinker	133	501	132	.263	2	55
3B	Germany Schaefer	81	291	57	.196	0	14
OF	John Dobbs	59	235	71	.302	0	35
OF	Jimmy Slagle	117	463	146	.315	0	28
OF	Davy Jones	64	243	74	.305	0	14

==== Other batters ====
Note: G = Games played; AB = At bats; H = Hits; Avg. = Batting average; HR = Home runs; RBI = Runs batted in

Player	G	AB	H	Avg.	HR	RBI
Charlie Dexter	71	273	62	.227	2	26
Jock Menefee	65	216	50	.231	0	15
Bunk Congalton	47	188	45	.239	1	27
Dusty Miller	51	187	46	.246	0	13
Art Williams	47	167	38	.228	0	14
Hal O'Hagen	33	115	22	.191	0	10
Johnny Evers	26	90	20	.222	0	2
Jim Murray	12	47	8	.170	0	1
Dad Clark	12	43	8	.186	0	2
Larry Schlafly	10	31	10	.323	0	5
Mike Lynch	7	28	4	.143	0	0
Mike Jacobs	5	19	4	.211	0	2
Mike Kahoe	7	18	4	.222	0	2
Sammy Strang	3	11	4	.364	0	0
Pete Lamer	2	9	2	.222	0	2
Jack Hendricks	2	7	4	.571	0	0
Ed Glenn	2	7	0	.000	0	0
Chick Pedroes	2	6	0	.000	0	0
Snapper Kennedy	1	5	0	.000	0	0
R.E. Hillebrand	1	4	0	.000	0	0
Joe Hughes	1	3	0	.000	0	0

=== Pitching ===
==== Starting pitchers ====
Note: G = Games pitched; IP = Innings pitched; W = Wins; L = Losses; ERA = Earned run average; SO = Strikeouts

Player	G	IP	W	L	ERA	SO
Jack Taylor	37	333.2	23	11	1.29	88
Pop Williams	32	263.1	11	16	2.49	99
Jock Menefee	22	197.1	12	10	2.42	60
Carl Lundgren	18	160.0	9	9	1.97	68
Bob Rhoads	16	118.0	4	8	3.20	43
Jim St. Vrain	12	95.0	4	6	2.08	51
Frank Morrissey	5	40.0	1	3	2.25	13
Alex Hardy	4	35.0	2	2	3.60	12
Jim Gardner	3	25.0	1	2	2.88	6
Mal Eason	2	18.0	1	1	1.00	4
Fred Glade	1	8.0	0	1	9.00	3
