= 1902 New York Giants season =

1902 New York Giants
- League: National League
- Ballpark: Polo Grounds
- City: New York City
- Record: 48–88 (.353)
- League place: 8th
- Owners: Andrew Freedman, John T. Brush
- Managers: Horace Fogel, Heinie Smith, John McGraw

The 1902 New York Giants season was the franchise's 20th season. The team finished with a 48–88 record, in eighth and last place in the National League, 53 1/2 games behind the Pittsburgh Pirates. Their .353 winning percentage remains the worst in franchise history. At the end of September, owner Andrew Freedman left baseball, with John T. Brush taking over as majority owner and team president.

== Regular season ==
=== Season standings ===
National League
Team	W	L	Pct.	GB	Home	Road
Pittsburgh Pirates	103	36	.741	—	56‍–‍15	47‍–‍21
Brooklyn Superbas	75	63	.543	27½	45‍–‍23	30‍–‍40
Boston Beaneaters	73	64	.533	29	42‍–‍27	31‍–‍37
Cincinnati Reds	70	70	.500	33½	35‍–‍35	35‍–‍35
Chicago Orphans	68	69	.496	34	31‍–‍38	37‍–‍31
St. Louis Cardinals	56	78	.418	44½	28‍–‍38	28‍–‍40
Philadelphia Phillies	56	81	.409	46	29‍–‍39	27‍–‍42
New York Giants	48	88	.353	53½	24‍–‍44	24‍–‍44

=== Record vs. opponents ===
1902 National League record Sources:
Team	BSN	BRO	CHC	CIN	NYG	PHI	PIT	STL
Boston	—	8–12	11–9	11–9	16–3	11–9–1	6–14–1	10–8–3
Brooklyn	12–8	—	12–8	12–8	10–10	13–6	6–14–1	10–9–2
Chicago	9–11	8–12	—	12–8–1	10–10–4	10–10	7–13	12–5–1
Cincinnati	9–11	8–12	8–12–1	—	14–6	13–7	5–15	13–7
New York	3–16	10–10	10–10–4	6–14	—	6–12	6–13–1	7–13
Philadelphia	9–11–1	6–13	10–10	7–13	12–6	—	2–18	10–10
Pittsburgh	14–6–1	14–6–1	13–7	15–5	13–6–1	18–2	—	16–4
St. Louis	8–10–3	9–10–2	5–12–1	7–13	13–7	10–10	4–16	—

=== Notable transactions ===
- August 1902: Jim Jones was released by the Giants.

=== Roster ===
1902 New York Giants
Roster
Pitchers: Bob Blewett; John Burke; Jack Cronin; Roy Evans; Brickyard Kennedy; Bill Magee; Christy Mathewson; Joe McGinnity; Roscoe Miller; Tully Sparks; Dummy Taylor; Henry Thielman	Catchers: Frank Bowerman; John O'Neill; Jack Robinson; George Yeager; Infielders: Joe Bean; Jack Doyle; Billy Lauder; Dan McGann; John McGraw; Hal O'Hagan; Heinie Smith; Heinie Wagner	Outfielders: Roger Bresnahan; Steve Brodie; George Browne; Jim Callahan; Roy Clark; Jim Delahanty; Jack Dunn; Chick Hartley; Jack Hendricks; Jim Jackson; Jim Jones; Malcolm MacDonald; George Van Haltren; Joe Wall; Libe Washburn	Manager: Horace Fogel; John McGraw; Heinie Smith

== Player stats ==
=== Batting ===
==== Starters by position ====
Note: Pos = Position; G = Games played; AB = At bats; H = Hits; Avg. = Batting average; HR = Home runs; RBI = Runs batted in

Pos	Player	G	AB	H	Avg.	HR	RBI
C	Frank Bowerman	109	373	93	.249	0	27
1B	Dan McGann	61	227	68	.300	0	21
2B	Heinie Smith	140	517	129	.250	0	34
SS	Joe Bean	50	182	40	.220	0	5
3B	Billy Lauder	127	490	115	.235	0	43
OF	George Browne	53	216	69	.319	0	14
OF	Steve Brodie	110	420	118	.281	3	42
OF	Jim Jones	67	249	59	.237	0	19

==== Other batters ====
Note: G = Games played; AB = At bats; H = Hits; Avg. = Batting average; HR = Home runs; RBI = Runs batted in

Player	G	AB	H	Avg.	HR	RBI
Jack Dunn	100	342	72	.211	0	14
Jack Doyle	51	193	58	.301	0	18
Roger Bresnahan	51	178	51	.287	1	22
Jim Jackson	37	116	21	.181	0	15
George Yeager	39	108	22	.204	0	9
John McGraw	35	107	25	.234	0	5
George Van Haltren	26	96	24	.250	0	7
Hal O'Hagen	26	84	12	.143	0	8
Roy Clark	22	80	12	.150	0	3
Heinie Wagner	17	56	12	.214	0	2
Jack Hendricks	8	26	6	.231	0	0
Jim Delahanty	7	26	6	.231	0	3
Joe Wall	6	14	5	.357	0	0
John Burke	4	13	2	.154	0	0
Libe Washburn	6	9	4	.444	0	0
Henry Thielman	6	9	1	.111	0	0
Jack Robinson	4	9	0	.000	0	0
Malcolm MacDonald	2	9	3	.333	0	1
John O'Neill	2	8	0	.000	0	0
Jim Callahan	1	4	0	.000	0	0
Chick Hartley	1	4	0	.000	0	0

=== Pitching ===
==== Starting pitchers ====
Note: G = Games pitched; IP = Innings pitched; W = Wins; L = Losses; ERA = Earned run average; SO = Strikeouts

Player	G	IP	W	L	ERA	SO
Christy Mathewson	35	284.2	14	17	2.12	164
Luther Taylor	26	200.2	7	15	2.29	87
Roy Evans	23	176.0	8	13	3.17	48
Joe McGinnity	19	153.0	8	8	2.06	67
Tully Sparks	16	123.0	4	10	4.17	42
Jack Cronin	13	114.0	5	6	2.45	52
Roscoe Miller	10	72.2	1	8	4.58	15
Brickyard Kennedy	6	38.2	1	4	3.96	9
Henry Thielman	2	6.0	0	1	1.50	5

==== Other pitchers ====
Note: G = Games pitched; IP = Innings pitched; W = Wins; L = Losses; ERA = Earned run average; SO = Strikeouts

Player	G	IP	W	L	ERA	SO
Bob Blewett	5	28.0	0	2	4.82	8
Jack Dunn	3	26.2	0	3	3.71	6
John Burke	2	14.0	0	1	5.79	3
Bill Magee	2	5.0	0	0	3.60	2
