= 1907 Cincinnati Reds season =

1907 Cincinnati Reds
- League: National League
- Ballpark: Palace of the Fans
- City: Cincinnati
- Record: 66–87 (.431)
- League place: 6th
- Owners: Garry Herrmann
- Managers: Ned Hanlon

The 1907 Cincinnati Reds season was a season in American baseball. The team finished sixth in the National League with a record of 66–87, 41½ games behind the Chicago Cubs.

== Regular season ==
The Reds posted their second straight losing season in 1907. They won two more games than they had in 1906, when they finished 51½ games behind the Chicago Cubs. Cincinnati brought back manager Ned Hanlon for a second season, while the team made some trades during the off-season to continue with their rebuilding.

=== Personnel changes ===
With third baseman Jim Delahanty purchased by the St. Louis Browns, the Reds' new third baseman was 23-year-old Mike Mowrey. Mowrey had seen limited playing time with the Reds in 1905 and 1906, appearing in twenty-eight games. Shortstop Tommy Corcoran, who was with Cincinnati from 1897, was purchased by the New York Giants, leaving the Reds with 25-year-old Hans Lobert to play the position. Lobert had a solid season in 1906 with the Reds, hitting .310 in 79 games. Catcher Larry McLean, who was also twenty-five, beat out Admiral Schlei for the starting catcher position, while 27-year-old rookie Mike Mitchell won a spot in the outfield. McLean spent the 1906 season with the Portland Beavers of the Pacific Coast League, where he hit .355, while Mitchell hit .339, splitting time between the Stockton Millers of the California League, and the Beavers in the PCL.

=== Pitching ===
24-year-old pitcher Andy Coakley, who spent the previous five seasons with the Philadelphia Athletics of the American League, also joined the Reds. Coakley had gone 7–8 with a 3.14 ERA with the A's in 1906, and had his best season with Philadelphia in 1905, when he went 18–8 with a 1.84 ERA in 35 games. Another new player for the Reds was first baseman John Ganzel. Ganzel, who was thirty-three years old, had not played in the major leagues since 1904 with the New York Highlanders of the American League, where he hit .260 with six homers and 48 RBI. In 1906 with the Grand Rapids Wolverines of the Central League, Ganzel hit .323 with thirteen home runs.

=== Season summary ===
The new look Reds saw the same results though, as for the second straight year, the team had a 10–20 record after thirty games, as Cincinnati sat in sixth place, 14.5 games behind the Cubs. During a game on May 8, Big Jeff Pfeffer of the Boston Doves threw a no-hitter against the Reds.

The team played better ball over the next few weeks, going 18–14 in their next thirty-two games, however, they still sat in fifth place with a 28–34 record, 19 game behind the Cubs. A slump of 5–17 during the next twenty-two games saw the Reds sink to seventh place, 29.5 games behind the Cubs with a 33–51 record. Cincinnati then played just under .500 baseball for the rest of the year, going 33–36 in their last sixty-nine games, to finish the season with a 66–87 record, good for sixth place for the second straight season, as they were 41.5 games behind the pennant winning Cubs.

Mitchell had a solid rookie season, leading Cincinnati with a .292 batting average with a team high 163 hits. Mitchell also hit three homers, and drove in 47 runners. McLean batted .289 with no homers and 54 RBI, while Ganzel hit .254 with two home runs and a team best 64 RBI.

On the mound, Bob Ewing had a great year, despite posting a record of 17–19, as he led the staff with a 1.73 ERA in 41 games, starting 37 of them, while throwing 32 complete games. Coakley tied Ewing in wins, as he was 17–16, while posting a 2.34 ERA in 37 games.

=== Season standings ===
National League
Team	W	L	Pct.	GB	Home	Road
Chicago Cubs	107	45	.704	—	54‍–‍19	53‍–‍26
Pittsburgh Pirates	91	63	.591	17	47‍–‍29	44‍–‍34
Philadelphia Phillies	83	64	.565	21½	45‍–‍30	38‍–‍34
New York Giants	82	71	.536	25½	45‍–‍30	37‍–‍41
Brooklyn Superbas	65	83	.439	40	37‍–‍38	28‍–‍45
Cincinnati Reds	66	87	.431	41½	43‍–‍36	23‍–‍51
Boston Doves	58	90	.392	47	31‍–‍42	27‍–‍48
St. Louis Cardinals	52	101	.340	55½	31‍–‍47	21‍–‍54

=== Record vs. opponents ===
1907 National League record Sources:
Team	BSN	BRO	CHC	CIN	NYG	PHI	PIT	STL
Boston	—	12–7–2	5–17	9–13	9–13	8–11–1	9–13–1	6–16
Brooklyn	7–12–2	—	5–15–1	15–7–1	10–12–1	8–13	6–16	14–8
Chicago	17–5	15–5–1	—	17–5	16–6	14–8	12–10–1	16–6–1
Cincinnati	13–9	7–15–1	5–17	—	9–13–1	8–13	10–12–1	14–8
New York	13–9	12–10–1	6–16	13–9–1	—	11–10	10–12	17–5
Philadelphia	11–8–1	13–8	8–14	13–8	10–11	—	14–8	14–7–1
Pittsburgh	13–9–1	16–6	10–12–1	12–10–1	12–10	8–14	—	20–2
St. Louis	16–6	8–14	6–16–1	8–14	5–17	7–14–1	2–20	—

=== Roster ===
1907 Cincinnati Reds
Roster
Pitchers: Billy Campbell; Andy Coakley; Bill Essick; Bob Ewing; Charley Hall; Roy Hitt; Frank Leary; Del Mason; Cotton Minahan; Fred Smith; Bob Spade; Jake Weimer	Catchers: Pete Lamer; Bill McCarthy; Larry McLean; Admiral Schlei; Infielders: John Ganzel; Miller Huggins; Hans Lobert; Mike Mowrey	Outfielders: Chick Autry; Lefty Davis; John Kane; Art Kruger; Mike Mitchell; Mike O'Neill; Fred Odwell; Dode Paskert; Harry Wolter; Other batters: Eddie Tiemeyer	Manager: Ned Hanlon

== Player stats ==
=== Batting ===
==== Starters by position ====
Note: Pos = Position; G = Games played; AB = At bats; H = Hits; Avg. = Batting average; HR = Home runs; RBI = Runs batted in

Pos	Player	G	AB	H	Avg.	HR	RBI
C	Larry McLean	113	374	108	.289	0	54
1B	John Ganzel	145	531	135	.254	2	64
2B	Miller Huggins	156	561	139	.248	1	31
SS	Hans Lobert	148	537	132	.246	1	41
3B	Mike Mowrey	138	448	113	.252	1	44
OF	Art Kruger	100	317	74	.233	0	28
OF	Fred Odwell	94	274	74	.270	0	24
OF	Mike Mitchell	148	558	163	.292	3	47

==== Other batters ====
Note: G = Games played; AB = At bats; H = Hits; Avg. = Batting average; HR = Home runs; RBI = Runs batted in

Player	G	AB	H	Avg.	HR	RBI
Lefty Davis	73	266	61	.229	1	25
John Kane	79	262	65	.248	3	19
Admiral Schlei	84	246	67	.272	0	27
Dode Paskert	16	50	14	.280	1	8
Mike O'Neill	9	29	2	.069	0	2
Chick Autry	7	25	5	.200	0	0
Harry Wolter	4	15	2	.133	0	1
Bill McCarthy	3	8	1	.125	0	0
Pete Lamer	1	2	0	.000	0	0
Eddie Tiemeyer	1	0	0	----	0	0

=== Pitching ===
==== Starting pitchers ====
Note: G = Games pitched; IP = Innings pitched; W = Wins; L = Losses; ERA = Earned run average; SO = Strikeouts

Player	G	IP	W	L	ERA	SO
Bob Ewing	41	332.2	17	19	1.73	147
Andy Coakley	37	265.1	17	16	2.34	89
Jake Weimer	29	209.0	11	14	2.41	67
Roy Hitt	21	153.1	6	10	3.40	63
Bob Spade	3	27.0	1	2	1.00	7
Billy Campbell	3	21.0	3	0	2.14	4
Cotton Minahan	2	14.0	0	2	1.29	4

==== Other pitchers ====
Note: G = Games pitched; IP = Innings pitched; W = Wins; L = Losses; ERA = Earned run average; SO = Strikeouts

Player	G	IP	W	L	ERA	SO
Del Mason	25	146.0	5	12	3.14	45
Fred Smith	18	85.1	2	7	2.85	19
Charley Hall	11	68.0	4	2	2.51	25
Bill Essick	3	21.2	0	2	2.91	7
Frank Leary	2	8.0	0	1	1.13	4
