= Kansas City Blue Stockings =

- 1902–1903; Kansas City, Missouri

Minor league affiliations
- Class: Class A (1902–1903)
- League: Western League (1902–1903)

Major league affiliations
- Team: None

Minor league titles
- League titles (1): 1902

Team data
- Name: Kansas City Blue Stockings (1902–1903)
- Ballpark: Sportsman's Park (1902–1903)

The Kansas City Blue Stockings were a minor league baseball team based in Kansas City, Missouri. In 1902 and 1903, the Kansas City Blue Stockings played exclusively as members of the Class A level Western League, capturing the 1902 league championship. After the 1903 season, the franchise was forced to fold as the result of a territory dispute between the Western League and American Association.

The Kansas City Blue Stockings were founded to replace the Kansas City Blues franchise in the Western League.

The Blue Stockings played minor league home games at Sportsman's Park, which was built for the team before the 1902 season.

Baseball Hall of Fame member Kid Nichols was a player/manager and part–owner of the Blue Stockings.

== History ==
The Kansas City Blue Stockings were founded in 1902 to replace the Kansas City Blues in the Class A level Western League. In the era, Class A was the highest level of minor league baseball. The Kansas City Blues moved from the Western League to become members of the 1902 Class A level American Association. In 1900, the original Kansas City Blues had relocated to become the Washington Senators for the first season of the American League.

When the Kansas City Blue Stockings were formed to directly replace the Kansas City Blues in the 1902 Western Association, the combined franchise moves resulted in Kansas City having two Class A minor league baseball teams simultaneously, which proved to be tenuous.

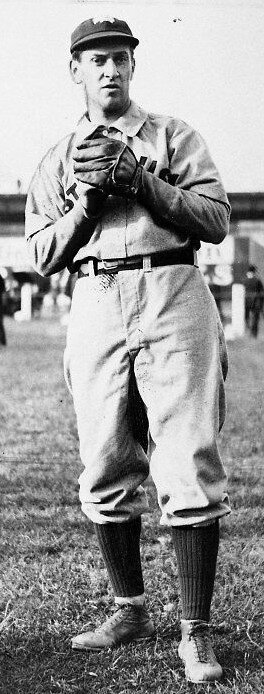
(1904) Baseball Hall of Fame member Kid Nichols. Nichols was owner/player/manager of the Blue Stockings.

The Kansas City Blue Stockings began play at their newly built Sportsman's Park. The 1902 Kansas City Blue Stockings found a player/manager/part owner in Kid Nichols, an accomplished major league pitcher. Former Kansas City Blues and Washington Senators owner/ manager Jim Manning was the other franchise owner. Nichols had begun his professional career in the Western League with the 1887 Kansas City Cowboys and remained to play for Jim Manning with 1888 Kansas City Blues. Aside from major league pitching with the Boston Beaneaters, Nichols had also coached with nearby Amherst College (1899), Yale (1900) and Brown University (1901). Nichols had received an offer from Brown to coach in 1902, but when the opportunity arose to return to Kansas City to co–own and manage the newly formed Blue Stockings, Nichols accepted and set his major league playing career aside.

In their first season of play, the Kansas City Blue Stockings won the 1902 Western League Championship. Led by player/manager Kid Nichols, the Kansas City Blue Stockings finished 1st in the league standings with a 82–54 record. In the Western League standings, Kansas City finished mere percentage points ahead of the 2nd place Omaha Indians (84–56), followed by the Milwaukee Creams (80–54), Denver Grizzlies (81–57), St. Joseph Saints (71–68), Colorado Springs Millionaires (63–75), Des Moines Midgets (54–83) and Peoria Distillers (35–103). Nichols was 27–7, with an ERA of 1.82 as a pitcher. Jake Weimer led the league with 209 Strikeouts.

The Blues pitched two no-hitters in 1902. On July 19, 1902, Norwood Gibson of Kansas City threw a no–hitter in against the Omaha Indians in a 3–2 loss. On August 25, 1902, Blues pitchers Jake Weimer and Norwood Gibson combined for a no–hitter against the St. Joseph Saints in a 3–0 10–inning victory.

After the 1902 regular seasons were completed, both Kansas City teams met in an informal "championship series," with the games hosting up to 10,000 fans. In the series, the American Association Kansas City Blues won 4 to 2 over the Western League Kansas City Blue Stockings. Each winning Blues player received about a $200.00 share.

The Kansas City Blue Stockings played their final season in 1903. Continuing play in the 1903 Western League, the Kansas City Blue Stockings finished in 3rd place, 18.0 games behind the 1st place Milwaukee Creams. The Blue Stockings finished with a record of 65–61, as player/manager Kid Nichols was 21–12 with a 2.51 ERA as a pitcher. Mike Jacobs led the league with 8 home runs.

After the 1903 season, the American Association and Western League negotiated territory rights, as both were Class A minor leagues, the highest level of minor leagues. As a result, the Kansas City Blues remained in Kansas City and the Kansas City Blue Stockings were forced to permanently fold the franchise. Relatedly, Milwaukee also had the exact situation and the Milwaukee Creams of the Western League were also forced to fold their franchise, with the Milwaukee Brewers continuing in the American Association.

After the Blue Stockings were forced to fold, Kid Nichols resumed his major career with the 1904 St. Louis Cardinals. As player/manager for the Cardinals, Nichols was 21–13 with a 2.02 ERA. Nichols would retire as a player after the 1906 season with 362 victories. Nichols was inducted into the Baseball Hall of Fame in 1949.

== The ballpark ==
The Kansas City Blue Stockings hosted minor league home games at Sportsman's Park. Sportsman's Park was built before the 1902 season, funded by Kid Nichols and longtime Kansas City Blues owner/manager Jim Manning to house the Kansas City Blue Stockings. The ballpark had a reported capacity of 3,500. Sportsman's Park opened on May 2, 1902, as the Blue Stockings hosted the Denver Grizzlies. Later known as Recreation Park, the ballpark was located at Indiana Avenue & 17th Street in Kansas City, Missouri.

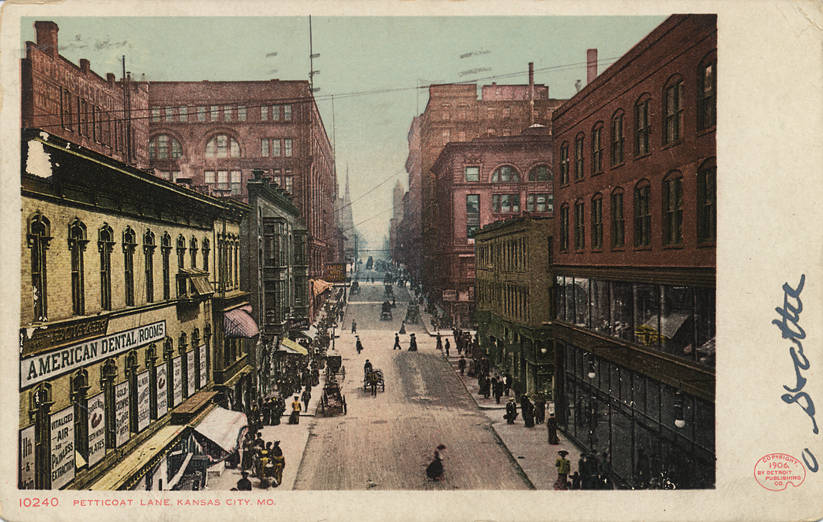
(1900) Petticoat Lane. Kansas City, Missouri

== Timeline ==
Year(s)	# Yrs.	Team	Level	League	Ballpark
1902–1903	2	Kansas City Blue Stockings	Class A	Western League	Sportsman's Park

== Year–by–year records ==
Year	Record	Finish	Manager	Playoffs/Notes
1902	82–54	1st	Kid Nichols	League champions
1903	65–61	3rd	Kid Nichols	No playoffs Held

== Notable alumni ==
- Kid Nichols (1902–1903, MGR) Inducted Baseball Hall of Fame, 1949
- Dad Clark (1902)
- Ira Davis (1902)
- Lee DeMontreville (1902)
- Norwood Gibson (1902)
- John Halla (1903)
- Roy Hartzell (1902)
- Otto Hess (1903)
- Mike Hickey (1902)
- Harry Huston (1903)
- Mike Jacobs (1903)
- Nick Kahl (1903)
- Bill Kemmer (1902)
- Fred Ketchum (1902–1903)
- Jim Manning (1902–1903, owner)
- Tom Messitt (1902–1903)
- Dusty Miller (1902)
- Larry Milton (1903)
- Rabbit Robinson (1902)
- Frank Shannon (1902)
- Irv Waldron (1902–1903)
- Bill Wilson (1902)

== See also ==
- Kansas City Blue Stockings players
- Sports in Kansas City
