= Jim Manning (baseball, born 1862) =

American baseball player, manager, and executive (1862–1929)

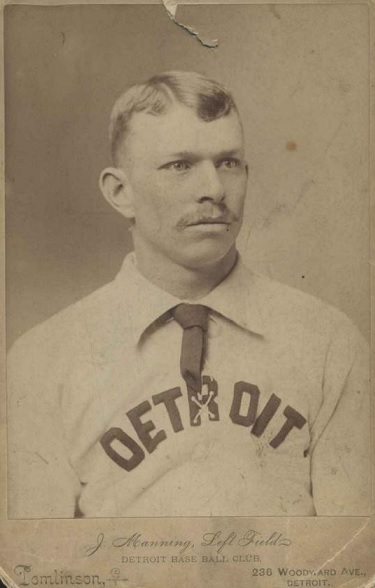
- Outfielder
- Born: January 31, 1862; Fall River, Massachusetts, U.S.
- Died: October 22, 1929 (aged 67); Edinburg, Texas, U.S.
- Batted: Switch Threw: Right

MLB debut
- May 18, 1884, for the Boston Beaneaters

Last MLB appearance
- October 13, 1889, for the Kansas City Cowboys (AA)

MLB statistics
- Batting average: .215
- Home runs: 8
- Runs batted in: 149
- Stats at Baseball Reference

Teams
- As player: Boston Beaneaters (1884–85); Detroit Wolverines (1885–87); Kansas City Cowboys (AA) (1889); As manager: Washington Senators (1901)

James Henry Manning (January 31, 1862 – October 22, 1929) was an American professional baseball player, manager, executive and team owner. He played five seasons in Major League Baseball, primarily as an outfielder (261 games), but also as a second baseman (72 games), shortstop (35 games), and third baseman (four games). He played four years in the National League with the Boston Beaneaters (1884–85) and the Detroit Wolverines (1885–87). He also played professional baseball in Kansas City, Missouri, primarily as a second baseman, from 1887 to 1892 and 1894 to 1897, including one year in the American Association with the Kansas City Cowboys.

Manning was one of the three principal organizers of the Western League in 1893 and was the owner and manager of the Kansas City Cowboys/Blues from 1894 to 1900. He was also one of the principal organizers of the American League and the first owner and manager of the Washington Senators when his Kansas City club moved to Washington, D.C. in 1901. He was also the player-manager of the Birmingham Grays in 1892, the owner, manager and second baseman of the Savannah, Georgia baseball club in 1893, and the owner and president of the Kansas City Blue Stockings club in the Western League from 1902 to 1903.

== Early years ==
Manning was born in Fall River, Massachusetts, in 1862. His parents, Thomas and Catherine Manning, were immigrants from Ireland. His father worked as a common laborer. Manning had three younger sisters, Julia, Elizabeth and Mary.

== Professional baseball player ==
=== Boston ===
Manning made his debut in professional baseball playing for the Springfield, Massachusetts, club in 1883. He made his major league debut for the Boston Beaneaters in May 1884. At age 22, he appeared in 89 games for the Beaneaters, 73 as an outfielder, nine each at second base and shortstop, and three at third base. He compiled a .241 batting average in 345 at bats, and totaled 52 runs, 83 hits and 35 RBIs in 89 games. In 1885, Manning appeared in 84 games for Boston, 83 of them as an outfielder. His batting average dropped to .206 in 306 at bats.

=== Detroit ===
In September 1885, the Detroit Wolverines purchased Manning from the Beaneaters for $500. Manning appeared in 20 games, all at shortstop, for the 1885 Wolverines. The following year, he served as a backup outfielder for the 1886 Wolverines, appearing in 25 games at the position. After batting .269 in 1885 for Detroit, his batting average dropped 83 points to .186 in 1886.

Manning began the 1887 season in Detroit, but the team was loaded with talent, and Manning faced the prospect of again being a backup player. The Sporting Life opined in February 1887, "Jimmy Manning ought not be a substitute in any nine. He is too good a ball player to be idle most of the time." In May 1887, the Wolverines sent their "extra men" (Manning and Knowlton) to the Kansas City Cowboys in order to relieve the club of salary obligations for players it did not need. Manning played in Kansas City for the next two months of the 1887 season, but Detroit reclaimed Manning in July, after an injury to second baseman Fred Dunlap. Manning appeared in only 13 games for the 1887 Wolverines, 10 in the outfield and three at shortstop, compiling a .192 batting average. In late July 1887, The Sporting News reported that Manning was "troubled with malaria" that he had contracted in Kansas City.

=== Kansas City, Part I ===
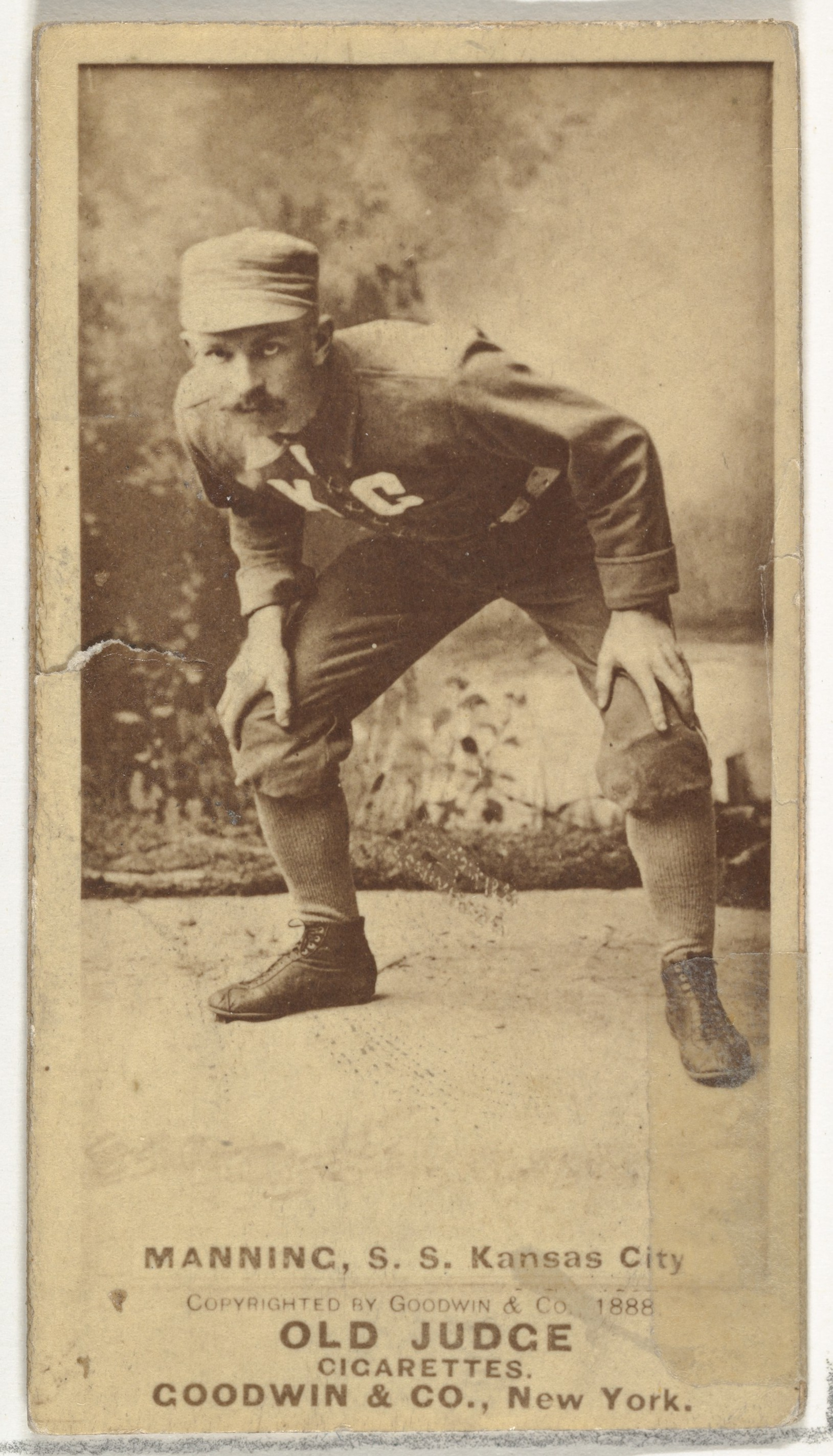
Jim Manning, 1888

Manning spent all or parts of six seasons with the Kansas City Cowboys from 1887 to 1892. He was acquired from Detroit in the middle of May 1887, and by the middle of July, Manning was referred to in The Sporting Life as "the best and most popular player that ever wore a Kansas City uniform." He was reclaimed by Detroit for 13 games in July, but then returned to Kansas City in the middle of August. Manning compiled a career high .433 batting average in 381 at bats for the 1887 Cowboys. He played at shortstop for the Cowboys in 1887 and performed well defensively, the Kansas City correspondent to The Sporting Life calling him "the greatest of shortstops at short field."

In 1888, Kansas City had two rival baseball teams, both called the Cowboys, with one playing in the American Association, and the other playing in the Western Association. Manning was player-manager of the Cowboys in the Western Association during the 1888 season. He hit .289 and stole 101 bases in 116 games.

During the 1889 season, Manning joined the Cowboys of the American Association, considered a major league. Manning appeared in 132 games, 69 in the outfield and 63 at second base, and compiled a .204 batting average in 506 at bats. According to baseball historian David Nemec, Manning's .204 batting average was the lowest recorded up to that time by a major league player with at least 500 at bats in a season. Germany Schaefer broke Manning's record in 1891 with a .201 average in 512 at bats. In fact, Manning was not the offensive liability that his batting average might suggest; he drew 54 bases on balls and was hit by pitch 13 times to boost his on-base percentage to .297, and he also stole 58 bases during the 1889 season.

During the winter of 1888–89, Manning traveled to Hawaii, Australia, Ceylon, Arabia, Egypt, Europe, and the British Isles as part of Albert Spalding's "Around the World Baseball Tour". Baseball games were held between the Chicago White Stockings and a picked team called the "All-Americans"; Manning played for the "All-Americans".

In 1890, the Cowboys left the American Association and rejoined the Western Association. In July 1890, Manning took over as the manager of the Cowboys, returning to the player-manager role he had filled in 1888. Manning had the best base-stealing record in organized baseball during the 1890 season, stealing 96 bases in only 111 games.

In 1891, Manning managed the club, played second base, and hit .299 with 10 triples and 58 stolen bases in 116 games.

In February 1892, Manning signed with Kansas City to again manage the team and play second base. The Kansas City correspondent to The Sporting Life wrote at the time: "The news that Manning is to be with us again was hailed with satisfaction by his great army of friends, who have learned to admire him as a player and a gentleman during his many years' service in Kansas City. It may be put down as certain that no club in the Western League will have a better manager or as good a second baseman as Jimmy Manning." During the first half of the 1892 season, Manning hit .303 with 30 stolen bases in 62 games.

== Baseball manager and owner ==
=== Birmingham ===
In late July 1892, Manning left Kansas City to become player-manager for the Birmingham Grays of the Southern League. He compiled a .268 batting average in 38 games for Birmingham, and assembled a team that was in competition for the Southern League pennant.

=== Savannah ===
In 1893, Manning was a player-manager and owner of the Savannah, Georgia club in the 12-team Southern Base Ball League. He played second base for the team and compiled a .290 batting average in 89 games. However, the team and the league disbanded in mid-August 1893. Despite the league's failure, the Savannah club made money and paid its bills on time, and Manning left in late August with a profit estimated at $4,000. The Savannah correspondent to The Sporting Life wrote that Manning left the city "with the well-wishes of everybody in Savannah" in appreciation for the way he conducted the club: "There was no kicking, no fighting or no tough ball playing allowed, and it was a pleasure to see the game played. . . . If ever a man deserved to make money he did. He came here a stranger to every one in the city, but by his gentlemanly conduct and courteous treatment of every one he came in contact with, he soon made a host of friends."

=== Kansas City, Part II ===
In the fall of 1893, Manning was one of the three principal organizers, along with Charlie Cushman and John S. Barnes, of the new Western League (a league that was later renamed the American League in 1900). In September 1893, he visited Kansas City to lay the groundwork for establishing a new baseball club there, including securing an option for the Exposition baseball grounds. The Kansas City Journal at the time called Manning "the most popular ball player who ever wore a Kansas City uniform." Manning told the press in Kansas City, "I spent six years here. Kansas City is like home to me ... If I put a new team here next year, as I hope to, it will be a winner, for that is what this town wants and what it demands."

In November 1893, the league was formally established with Manning as the owner of the Kansas City club. Manning expressed enthusiasm at the new league's prospects and said that the organizational meeting in Indianapolis had been "a complete and unqualified success." Manning also stated that he would staff the new Kansas City Cowboys teams largely with the players who he had managed in Savannah in 1892.

In 1894, served as the Kansas City team's owner and manager, and also played second base, compiling a .326 batting average with 43 extra base hits and 41 stolen bases.

During the 1895 season, Manning and his wife lived at the Centropolis Hotel in Kansas City, as Manning continued as owner and manager of the Kansas City Cowboys. He also appeared in 121 games as the team's second baseman and compiled a .359 batting average with 44 extra base hits and 39 stolen bases in 1895. Manning's team finished in second place in Western League in 1895. He reported that his team made profits of $18,000 in 1894 and $12,000 in 1895, the decline in 1895 resulting from "five wet Sundays and a bad fourth of July", with Sunday and holiday games generating profits of $1,000 on average.

In December 1895, Manning and Frank Selee organized a tour of baseball players to Australia for the winter of 1896–1897.

Manning continued to serve as team owner, manager and second baseman in 1896. Although he did not continue as a player after the 1897 season, he continued as the owner and manager of the Kansas City club through the 1900 season.

During Manning's seven years as manager and owner of the Kansas City Blues, the team's record was as follows:

Year	Record	Finish
1894	68-59	3rd
1895	73-52	3rd
1896	69-66	5th
1897	40-99	7th
1898	88-51	1st
1899	53-70	7th (t)
1900	69-70	5th

=== Washington ===
Manning was also one of the organizers of the American League as a competing major league. The organizational meeting was held at Chicago in late November 1900, with Manning attending as the representative of the proposed club in Washington, D.C., along with Charles Comiskey of Chicago, John McGraw of Baltimore, James D. Burns of Detroit and Henry Killilea of Milwaukee. At the meeting, it was decided that the new league would not have a team in Kansas City, and Manning was assigned responsibility for the proposed new club in Washington, D.C. Afterward, Manning stated: "I am reconciled to the idea of moving into Washington. I will take my team there bodily, will add a couple of National Leaguers and will show them that American League ball is a long way faster than they imagine."

In late 1900, Manning became president of the new American League club proposed for Washington, D.C. In December 1900, he secured a 10-year option on two ballparks in Washington and planned his move from Kansas City to Washington. In March 1901, the new team, named the Washington Senators, was incorporated by Manning, Fred Postal, Bob Needham, John J. Hogan and William F. Hart.

In 1901, Manning served as the first manager of the Senators, leading team to a 61–73 record. In November 1901, Manning sold his interest in the Senators to Fred Postal and also resigned as the team's manager. Later reports attributed Manning's departure to differences with co-owner Postal, who was not satisfied with Manning's business management, though Manning's defenders noted that Manning had "never posed as an expert book keeper, and was not originally engaged for business roles, and that point would have no bearing upon his re-engagement as team manager."

=== Kansas City, Part III ===
In January 1902, after selling his interest in the Senators, Manning and Kid Nichols became partners and co-owners in the new Kansas City Blue Stockings baseball club in the Western League. He also worked as the western agent for a new explosive. Through the 1902 and 1903 seasons, Manning served as the club's president and Nichols the manager. Manning's club faced stiff competition from the Kansas City Blues baseball club in the American Association during the 1902 and 1903 season and folded after the 1903 season due to territorial rights.

== Family and later years ==
Through his baseball career, Manning had returned home to Fall River, Massachusetts, where he worked as a druggist in a store operated by Will Smith. Smith died suddenly in September 1894, and The Sporting News wrote at the time: "For years Manager Manning has had that blessing that comes to so few -- a true friend. This friend, Mr. Will Smith, of Fall River, Mass., has been the sharer of all his hopes, his joy and his reverses. It was with him Manning made his first start in life, and every fall since he has been a devotee of the diamond he has returned home to again take up his work with Mr. Smith."

After retiring from baseball, Manning was employed in the powder business in 1906. The following year, he was reported to be "prospering in business in Kansas City."

In 1929, Manning died at age 67 in either Mercedes, Texas, or Edinburg, Texas. He was buried at the North Burial Ground in Fall River, Massachusetts.
