= Edwards (second baseman) =

American baseball player

- Second baseman
- Born: Unknown
- Died: Unknown
- Batted: Right Threw: Right

MLB debut
- September 17, 1915, for the Philadelphia Athletics

Last MLB appearance
- September 17, 1915, for the Philadelphia Athletics

MLB statistics
- Batting average: .250
- Home runs: 0
- Runs batted in: 0
- Stats at Baseball Reference

Teams
- Philadelphia Athletics (1915)

Edwards (fl. 1915) was an American professional baseball infielder. He played for the Philadelphia Athletics during the 1915 season.

Edwards was one of several players who debuted for Connie Mack's Athletics on September 17, 1915. He was described in The Philadelphia Inquirer as being "from the Chicago semi-pro ranks." He was described in the Evening Public Ledger as being from the Chicago City League. Per the Public Ledger, he was "believed" to be "a collegian playing under an assumed name" in order to preserve his amateur status.

Until October 2024, Edwards was misidentified as "Ralph Strunk Edwards." He is one of three 20th-century Major League Baseball players not to have a confirmed first name, the other two being Harrison of the 1901 Washington Senators (likely Leo J. Harrison) and R. E. Hillebrand of the 1902 Chicago Orphans.
