= Chick Autry =

Chick Autry may refer to:

- Chick Autry (first baseman) (William Askew Autry, 1885–1976), National League Baseball player 1907–1909
- Chick Autry (catcher) (Martin Gordon Autry, 1903–1950), American League Baseball player 1924–1930
