= Johnny Evers =

American baseball player and manager (1881–1947)

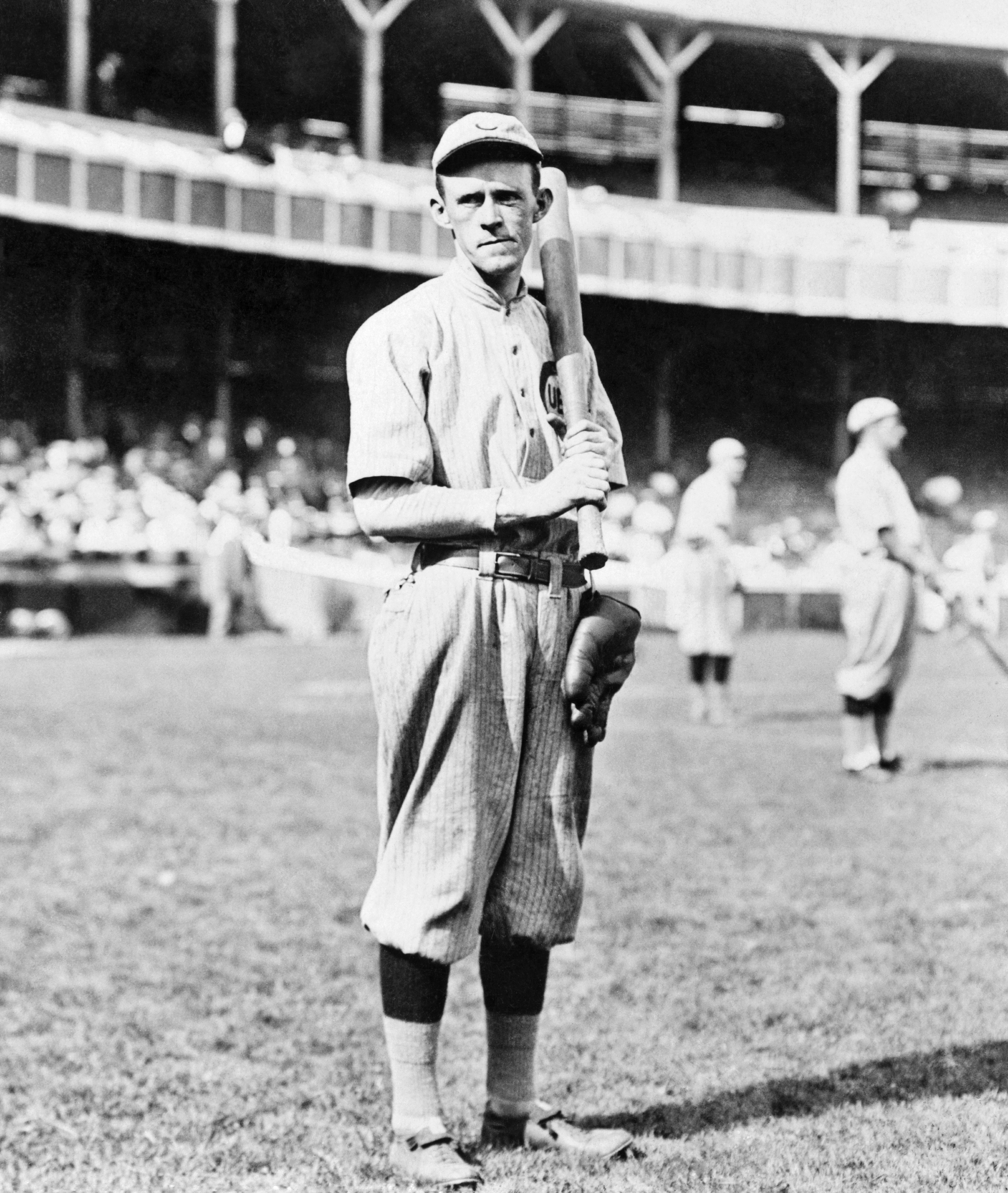
- Evers with the Chicago Cubs in 1910
- Second baseman / Manager
- Born: July 21, 1881; Troy, New York, U.S.
- Died: March 28, 1947 (aged 65); Albany, New York, U.S.
- Batted: Left Threw: Right

MLB debut
- September 1, 1902, for the Chicago Orphans

Last MLB appearance
- October 6, 1929, for the Boston Braves

MLB statistics
- Batting average: .270
- Home runs: 12
- Runs batted in: 538
- Stolen bases: 324
- Managerial record: 180–192–3
- Winning %: .484
- Stats at Baseball Reference
- Managerial record at Baseball Reference

Teams
- As player: Chicago Orphans / Cubs (1902–1913); Boston Braves (1914–1917); Philadelphia Phillies (1917); Chicago White Sox (1922); Boston Braves (1929); As manager: Chicago Cubs (1913, 1921); Chicago White Sox (1924)

Career highlights and awards
- 3× World Series champion (1907, 1908, 1914); NL MVP (1914); Chicago Cubs Hall of Fame

Member of the National

Baseball Hall of Fame
- Induction: 1946
- Election method: Old-Timers Committee

John Joseph Evers (July 21, 1881 – March 28, 1947) (Note: According to Tim Layden, Evers pronounced his name "EE-vers", not "EV-ers", as is widely known.) was an American professional baseball second baseman and manager. He played in Major League Baseball (MLB) from 1902 through 1917 for the Chicago Cubs, Boston Braves, and Philadelphia Phillies. He also appeared in one game apiece for the Chicago White Sox and Braves while managing them in 1922 and 1929, respectively.

Evers was born in Troy, New York. After playing for the local minor league baseball team for one season, Frank Selee, manager of the Cubs, purchased Evers's contract and soon made him his starting second baseman. Evers helped lead the Cubs to four National League pennants, including two World Series championships. The Cubs traded Evers to the Braves in 1914; that season, Evers led the Braves to victory in the World Series, and was named the league's Most Valuable Player.

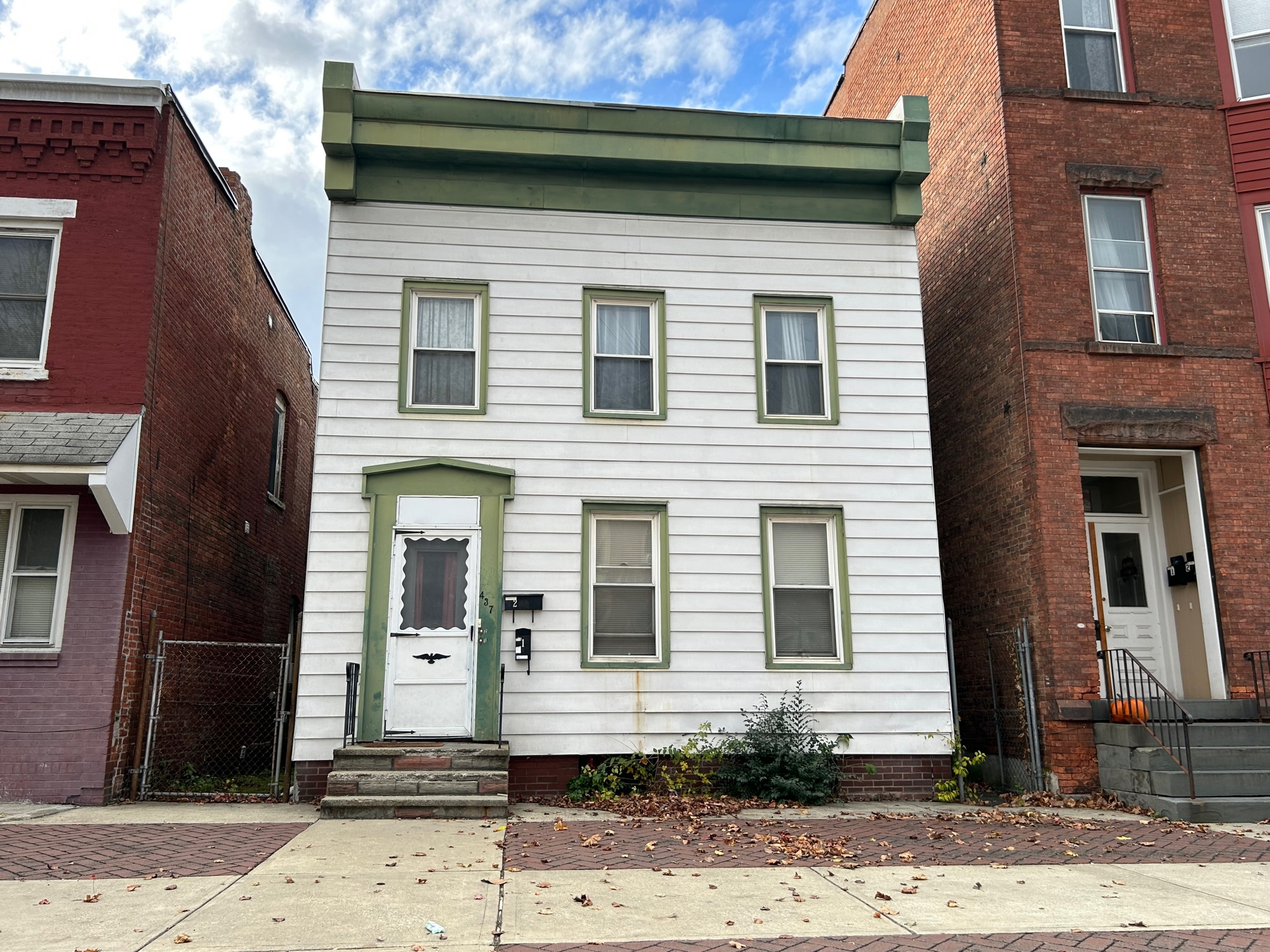
Johnny Evers boyhood home in Troy, New York.

Evers continued to play for the Braves and Phillies through 1917. He then became a coach, scout, manager, and general manager in his later career.

Known as one of the smartest ballplayers in MLB, Evers also had a surly temper that he took out on umpires. Evers was a part of a great double-play combination with Joe Tinker and Frank Chance, which was immortalized as "Tinker-to-Evers-to-Chance" in the poem "Baseball's Sad Lexicon". Evers was elected to the Baseball Hall of Fame by the Veterans Committee in 1946.

== Early life ==
Evers was born on July 21, 1881, in Troy, New York. His father worked as a saloon keeper. Many of Evers' relatives, including his father, brothers, and uncles, played baseball. Evers attended St. Joseph's Elementary School and played sandlot ball in Troy.

== Career ==
=== Minor league career ===
Evers made his professional debut in minor league baseball for the Troy Trojans of the Class-B New York State League in 1902 as a shortstop. Evers reportedly weighed less than 100 pounds (45 kg), and opposing fans thought he was a part of a comedic act. Evers reportedly weighed no more than 130 pounds (59 kg) during his career.

Evers batted .285 and led the New York State League with 10 home runs. Frank Selee, manager of the Chicago Cubs, scouted Evers's teammate, pitcher Alex Hardy. Selee, also looking for a second baseman due to an injury to starter Bobby Lowe, purchased Hardy's and Evers's contracts for $1,500 ($55,817 in current dollar terms); the Trojans were willing to sell Evers's services due to his temper.

=== Chicago Cubs ===
Evers made his MLB debut with the Cubs on September 1 at shortstop, as Selee moved Joe Tinker from shortstop to third base. Only three players in the National League (NL) were younger than Evers: Jim St. Vrain, Jimmy Sebring, and Lave Winham. Three days later, Selee returned Tinker to shortstop and assigned Evers to second base. In his month-long tryout with the Cubs, Evers batted .222 without recording an extra-base hit and played inconsistent defense. However, Lowe's injury did not properly heal by spring training in 1903, allowing Evers to win the starting job for the 1903 season. Lowe recovered during the 1903 season, but Evers' strong play made Lowe expendable; Evers finished third in the NL in fielding percentage among second basemen (.937), and finished fifth in assists (245) and putouts (306). The Cubs sold Lowe to the Pittsburgh Pirates after the season. Evers played 152 games in the 1904 season. Defensively, his 518 assists and 381 putouts led the NL, though his 54 errors led all NL second basemen.

During the 1906 season, Evers finished fifth in the NL with 49 stolen bases, and led the league with 344 putouts and led all second basemen with 44 errors. The Cubs won the NL pennant in 1906, but lost the 1906 World Series to the Chicago White Sox four games to two; Evers batted 3-for-20 (.150) in the series. During the 1907 season, Evers led the NL with 500 assists. The Cubs repeated as NL champions in 1907, and won the 1907 World Series over the Detroit Tigers, four games to none, as Evers batted 7-for-20 (.350).

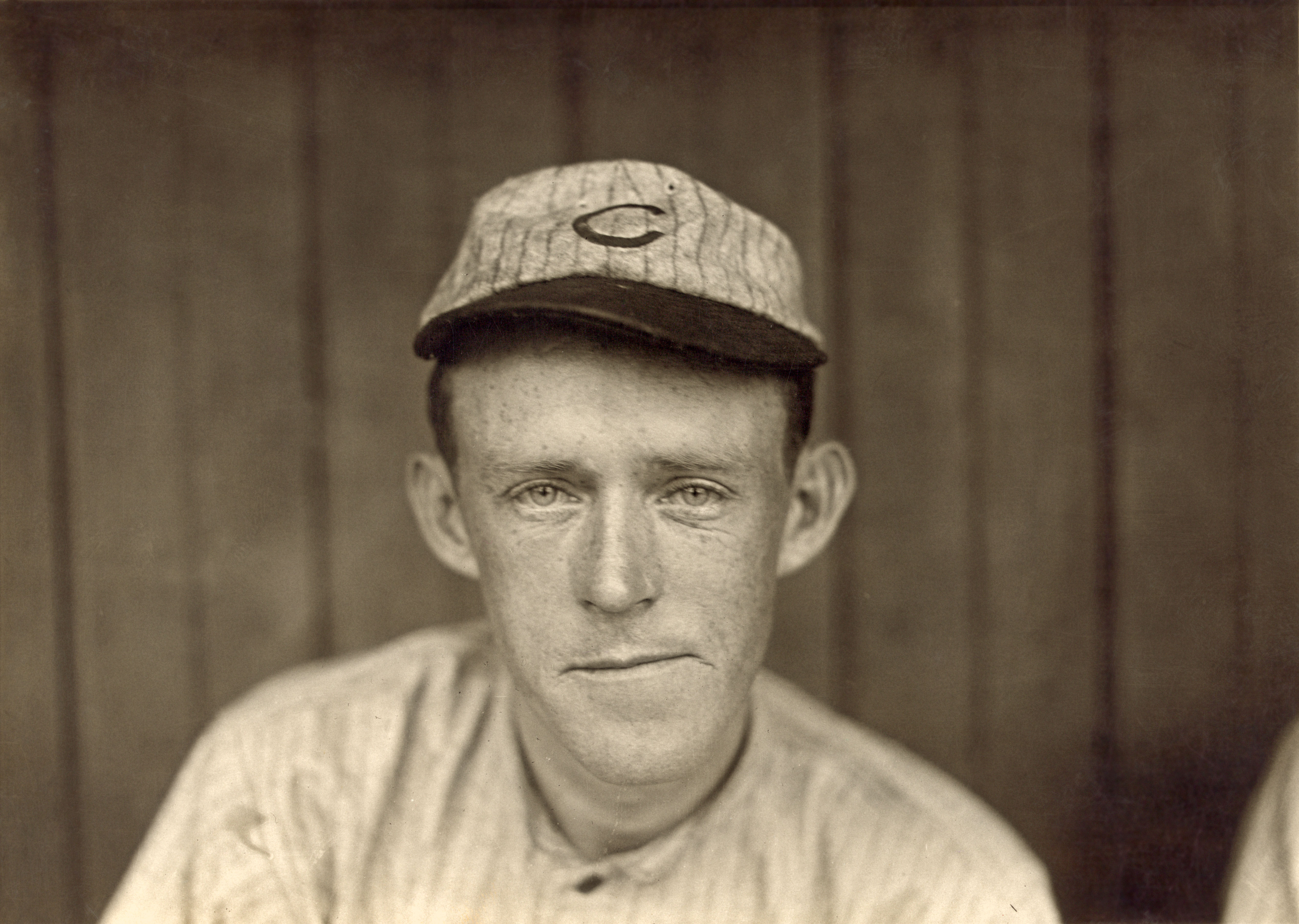
Evers with the Cubs, circa 1910

During the 1908 pennant race, Evers alerted the umpires to Fred Merkle's baserunning error in a game against the New York Giants, which became known as "Merkle's Boner". Al Bridwell hit what appeared to be the game-winning single for the Giants, while Merkle, the baserunner on first base, went to the clubhouse without touching second base. Evers called for the ball, and the umpire ruled Merkle out. NL president Harry Pulliam ruled the game a tie, with a makeup to be played. The Cubs won the makeup game, thereby winning the pennant. The Cubs then won the 1908 World Series over Detroit, four games to one, as Evers again batted 7-for-20 (.350). For the 1908 season, Evers had a .300 batting average, good for fifth in the NL, and a .402 on-base percentage, second only to Honus Wagner.

Evers drew 108 walks during the 1910 season, trailing only Miller Huggins. However, Evers missed the end of the season with a broken leg. Without Evers, the Cubs won the NL pennant, but lost the 1910 World Series to the Philadelphia Athletics, four games to one. Evers was involved in a car accident on May 20, 1910 that saw writer and friend George A. Macdonald killed when the automobile was struck by a trolley car that saw Evers see the result on Macdonald, who had his skull crushed. The sight of the accident overwhelmed Evers in grief, which Evers acknowledged in 1913 when he said he had "my first touch of nervous prostration." The financial disaster in Emerson Shoe Company, which he co-owned until it met ruin in late 1910, made matters worse. Evers agreed to manage the Navy Midshipmen, a college baseball team, in 1911, despite the opposition of Cubs' manager Frank Chance. He experienced a nervous breakdown in 1911; returning to the Cubs later in the season, he played in only 46 games that year. Evers indicated that this was a result of a business deal that cost Evers most of his savings. Evers rebounded to bat .341 in 1912, good for fourth in the NL, and he led the NL with a .431 on-base percentage. Team owner Charles W. Murphy named Evers manager in 1913, signing him to a five-year contract, succeeding Chance.

=== Boston Braves and Philadelphia Phillies ===
After the 1913 season, Evers was offered $100,000 ($3,257,576 in current dollar terms) to jump to the Federal League, but he opted to take less money to remain with the Cubs. In February 1914, after Evers signed his players to contracts, Murphy fired Evers as manager and traded him to the Boston Braves for Bill Sweeney and Hub Perdue. Murphy insisted that Evers had resigned as manager, which Evers denied. Evers insisted he was a free agent, but the league assigned him to the Braves. He signed a four-year contract at $10,000 per season ($321,429 in current dollar terms), with a $20,000 signing bonus.

During the 1914 season, the Braves fell into last place of the eight-team NL by July 4. However, the Braves came back from last place in the last ten weeks of the season to win the NL pennant. Evers' .976 fielding percentage led all NL second basemen. The Braves defeated the Philadelphia Athletics in the 1914 World Series, four games to none, as Evers batted 7-for-16 (.438). Evers won the Chalmers Award, the forerunner of the modern-day Most Valuable Player award, ahead of teammate Rabbit Maranville.

Evers was limited in 1915 by injuries, and also served suspension for arguing with umpires. After a poor season in 1916, Evers began the 1917 season with a .193 batting average. Due to Evers' declining performance, the Braves placed Evers on waivers at mid-season, and he was claimed by the Philadelphia Phillies. Evers rejected an offer to become manager of the Jersey City Skeeters of the International League that offseason. He signed with the Boston Red Sox as a player-coach for the 1918 season, but was released without playing a game for them. Not receiving another offer from an MLB team, Evers traveled to Paris as a member of the Knights of Columbus to promote baseball in France.

=== Coaching and managing career ===
In 1920, Evers was slated to become head baseball coach at Boston College, however he instead accepted a last minute offer to join the New York Giants as a coach. He managed the Cubs again in 1921, succeeding Fred Mitchell. With the team struggling, Evers was fired in August and replaced with Bill Killefer. The Cubs finished seventh out of eight in the NL that season.

Evers served as a coach for the Chicago White Sox in 1922 and 1923. He returned to second base in 1922, filling in for an injured Eddie Collins. Evers played in one game for the White Sox as Collins recovered.

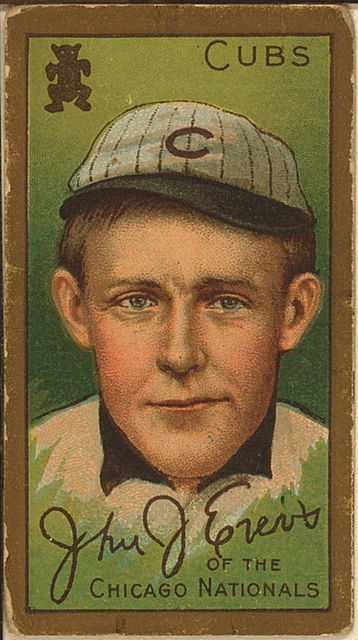
A 1911 Johnny Evers T205 Tobacco Card

Evers was named the White Sox acting manager for the 1924 season, succeeding Chance, who had been hired as manager during the offseason, was ordered home before the season began, due to poor health. However, Evers suffered from appendicitis during the season, missing time during the year, and the White Sox opened up a managerial search when Chance died in September. The White Sox replaced Evers with Collins after the season.

Evers rejoined the Braves as a scout. As Braves owner Emil Fuchs sold manager Rogers Hornsby to the Cubs and assumed managerial duties himself for the 1929 season, Fuchs hired Evers as a coach. Fuchs had no experience as a field manager, and so Evers became captain of the Braves, directing the team during the game and dealing with umpires. Evers and fellow coach Hank Gowdy played in one game in the 1929 season, coming into the bottom of the ninth inning on October 6, 1929. In the process, Evers became the oldest player in the league for the year.

Evers remained a coach for the Braves under Bill McKechnie, who succeeded Fuchs as field manager in 1930, and served in the role through 1932. He continued to scout for the Braves, and then became general manager of the Albany Senators of the New York–Pennsylvania League in 1935. He resigned from Albany at the end of the season. Over his managerial career, he posted a 180–192 record.

== Managerial record ==
Team	Year	Regular season					Postseason				
Team	Year	Games	Won	Lost	Tied	Win %	Finish	Won	Lost	Win %	Result
CHC	1913	155	88	65	2	.575	3rd in NL	–	–	–	–
CHC	1921	96	41	55	0	.427	fired	–	–	–	–
CHC total		251	129	120	2	.518		-	-	-	-
CWS (Note: One of three managers (over four different stints) for the White Sox in 1924; Evers was manager for the first 21 games, Ed Walsh was manager for the next three games, with a record of 1–2 (.333), Eddie Collins was manager for the next 27 games, going 14–13 (.519), and Evers once again served as the manager for the final 103 games. The White Sox final record for the 1924 season was 66–87–1 (.431).)	1924	21	10	11	0	.476	leave	–	–	–	–
CWS	1924	103	41	61	1	.402	8th in AL	–	–	–	–
CWS total		124	51	72	1	.415		-	-	-	-
Total		375	180	192	3	.484		-	-	-	-

== Personal ==
In January 1909, Evers married Helen Fitzgibbons. His son, John J. Evers, Jr., born later that year, served as a Lieutenant in World War II and was assigned to the Pacific Theater of Operations. During 1914, John Jr. became ill with scarlet fever and was being quarantined at home in Troy. A doctor granted Helen permission to allow their daughter Helen (then three at the time) to visit her ailing brother. Unfortunately, while John Jr. got better, Helen became ill and died weeks later. After that, Evers and his wife's uncertain marriage (made difficult because of their separated lives that saw him live in Chicago and her live in Troy) fell apart and the two essentially separated. When Helen died in 1974, she was buried with Evers in the same plot in Troy. When his son was 11 years old, Evers bought part of the Albany Senators and gave him the stock. Evers' brother, Joe Evers, and uncle, Tom Evers, also played in MLB. His great-nephew is Sports Illustrated writer Tim Layden, who wrote an article about him in 2012.

Though Evers and Tinker were part of one of the most successful double-play combinations in baseball history, the two despised each other off of the field. They went several years without speaking to each other after one argument. When Chance once named Tinker the smartest ballplayer he knew, Evers took it as a personal affront.

== Later life ==
In the 1920s, Evers settled in Troy to live with his older sister Anna Evers Kennedy. Evers operated a sporting goods store in Albany, New York in 1923. However, Evers lost his money and filed for bankruptcy in 1936. The store was passed down to Evers' descendants. He also worked as superintendent of Bleecker Stadium in Albany and spent time teaching baseball to sandlot players.

Evers suffered a stroke in August 1942, which paralyzed the right side of his body. He remained bedridden or used a wheelchair for most of the next five years. Evers died of a cerebral hemorrhage in 1947 at St. Peter's Hospital in Albany, and is buried in Saint Mary's Cemetery in Troy.

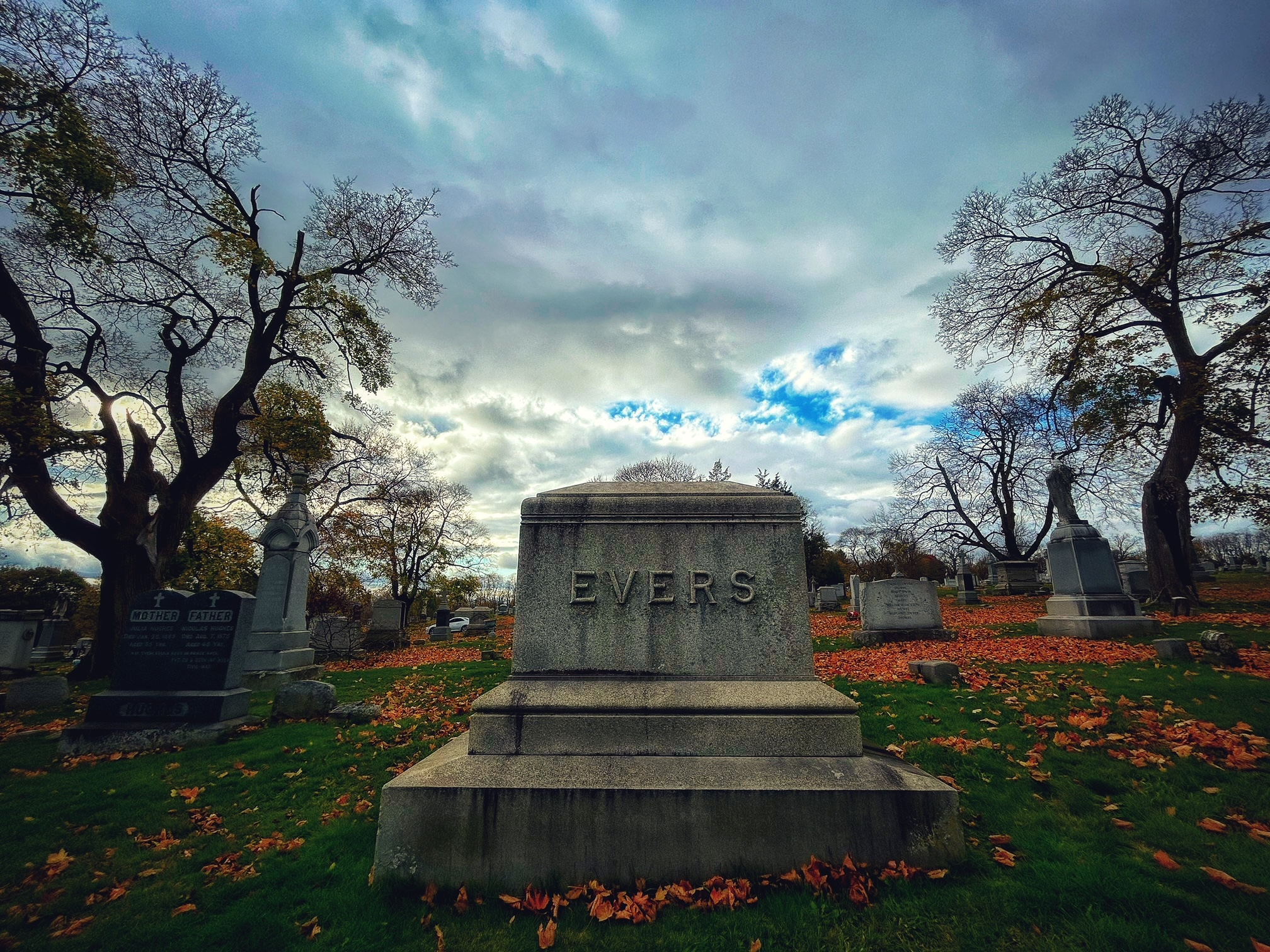
Johnny Evers gravesite at Saint Mary's Cemetery in Troy, New York.

== Legacy ==
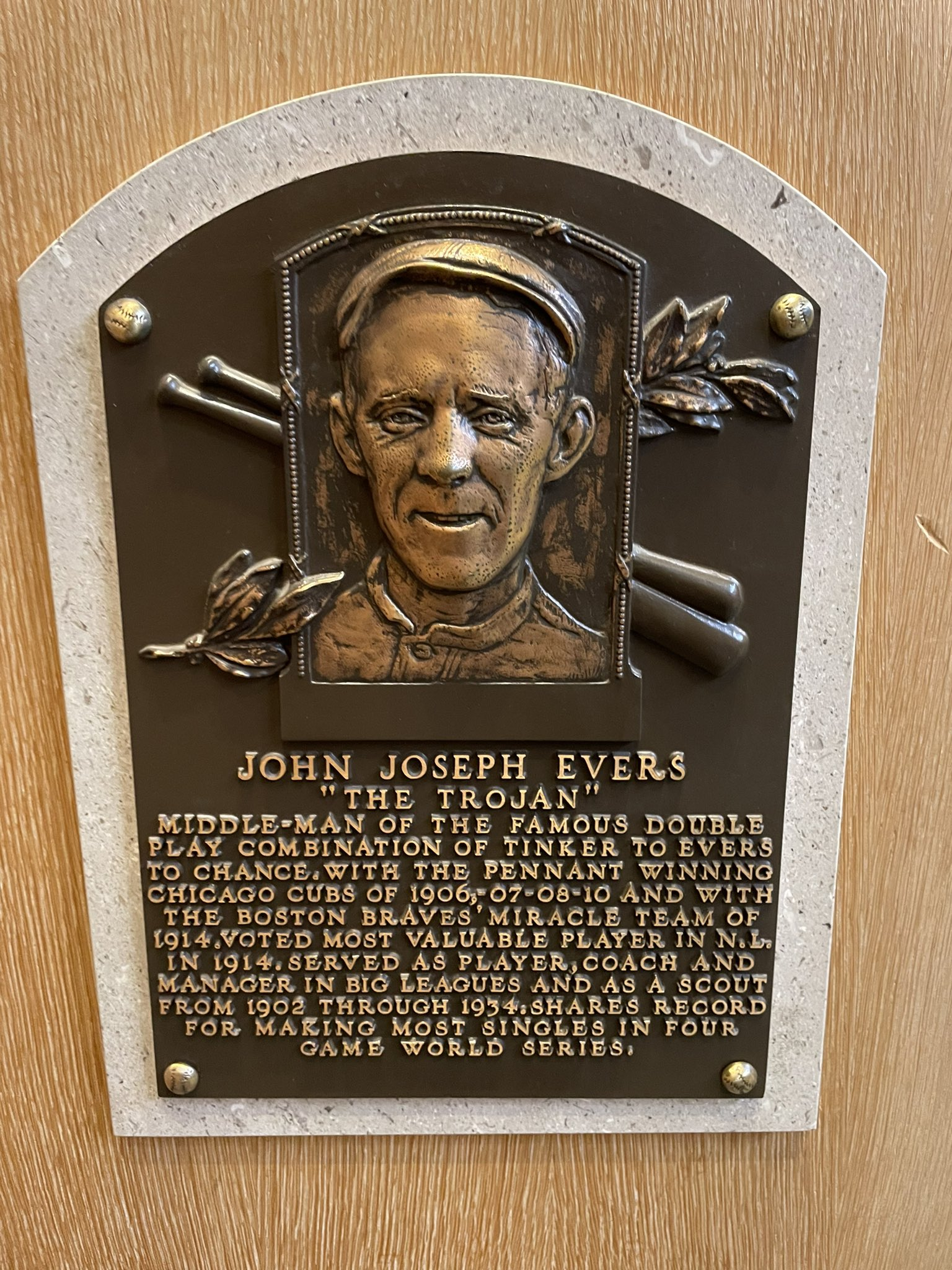
Evers' plaque of at the Baseball Hall of Fame

Evers retired in 1918, having batted .300 or higher twice in his career, stolen 324 bases and scored 919 runs. He frequently argued with umpires and received numerous suspensions during his career. His combative play and fights with umpires earned him the nickname "The Human Crab".

Evers served as the pivot man in the "Tinker-to-Evers-to-Chance" double-play combination, which inspired the classic baseball poem "Baseball's Sad Lexicon", written by New York Evening Mail newspaper columnist Franklin Pierce Adams in July 1910. Evers, Tinker, and Chance were all inducted in the Hall of Fame in the same year.

The Merkle play remains one of the most famous in baseball history. The ball used in the Merkle play was sold at an auction in the 1990s for $27,500, making it one of the four most valuable baseballs based on purchase price. Evers' role in Merkle's boner cemented his legacy as a smart ballplayer.

Evers is mentioned in the 1949 poem "Line-Up for Yesterday" by Ogden Nash:

Line-Up for Yesterday

E is for Evers,
His jaw in advance;
Never afraid
to Tinker with Chance.

— Ogden Nash, Sport magazine (January 1949)

== See also ==
- List of Major League Baseball career stolen bases leaders
- List of members of the Baseball Hall of Fame
- List of Major League Baseball player-managers
