= Leo Harrison (baseball) =

Baseball player

- Left fielder
- Batted: Unknown Threw: Unknown

MLB debut
- September 27, 1901, for the Washington Senators

Last MLB appearance
- September 27, 1901, for the Washington Senators

MLB statistics
- Games played: 1
- At bats: 2
- Hits: 0
- Stats at Baseball Reference

Teams
- Washington Senators (1901)

Harrison was a Major League Baseball left fielder who played in one game for the Washington Senators on September 27, 1901. He has tentatively been identified with Leo J. Harrison, a minor league player who played in the Southern League in the 1900s.

Harrison went hitless in two at bats, with one base on balls. His appearance did not impress either when fielding or batting, and a local newspaper's account of the game concluded of him that "If Manager Manning intended Harrison's appearance yesterday as a farewell joke, it is all right, and we will accept an apology, but if he was really serious and believed the fellow possessed the requisite qualities of a ball tosser, the local big chief is either deluding himself or else he is the victim of a gold brick enterprise."

Harrison is one of three 20th-century Major League Baseball players not to have a confirmed first name, the other two being R. E. Hillebrand of the 1902 Chicago Orphans and Edwards of the 1915 Philadelphia Athletics.
