= Chick Hartley =

American baseball player (1880-1948)

- Outfielder
- Born: August 22, 1880; Philadelphia, Pennsylvania, U.S.
- Died: July 18, 1948 (aged 67); Philadelphia, Pennsylvania, U.S.
- Batted: Right Threw: Right

MLB debut
- June 4, 1902, for the New York Giants

Last MLB appearance
- June 4, 1902, for the New York Giants

MLB statistics
- Batting average: .000
- Home runs: 0
- Runs batted in: 0
- Stats at Baseball Reference

Teams
- New York Giants (1902)

Walter Scott Hartley (August 22, 1880 – July 18, 1948) was an American outfielder in Major League Baseball who played in one game for the New York Giants in 1902.
