= Bill Kemmer =

American baseball player (1873–1945)

- Third baseman
- Born: November 15, 1873; Turbot Township, Pennsylvania, U.S.
- Died: June 8, 1945 (aged 71); Washington, D.C., U.S.
- Batted: Right Threw: Right

MLB debut
- June 3, 1895, for the Louisville Colonels

Last MLB appearance
- June 18, 1895, for the Louisville Colonels

MLB statistics
- Batting average: .184
- Home runs: 1
- Runs batted in: 3
- Stats at Baseball Reference

Teams
- Louisville Colonels (1895)

William Edward Kemmer (November 15, 1873 – June 8, 1945), nicknamed "Big Bill", was an American third baseman in Major League Baseball. He played for the Louisville Colonels in 1895 and also had a 17-year minor league career. Kenner stood at 6 ft 2 in (1.88 m) and weighed 195 lbs.

== Career ==
Kemmer was born in Turbot Township, Pennsylvania. He started his professional baseball career in 1893 in the Western Association, where he batted .328 in 15 games. Two years later, he was with Shreveport before being acquired by the Louisville Colonels to play third base. Kemmer, however, did not "fill the bill" and was eventually replaced with future Hall of Famer Jimmy Collins. In Kemmer's 11 Major League games in 1895, he went 7 for 38 (.184) at the plate.

Kemmer spent 1897 to 1899 in the Texas League. On April 18, 1898, he set a league record with 12 runs batted in during a single game. That mark was topped four years later, but it remains the second-highest total in Texas League history and the third-highest in all the minors leagues. Kemmer continued his hot-hitting in 1899, batting .331 with a league-leading 28 doubles. His 108 hits ranked second behind Lefty Houtz. That was the last season in which he would bat over .300.

Kemmer then played in Virginia for two years before moving to the Western League. He played for two Western League teams, the Kansas City Blue Stockings and St. Joseph Saints. In 1905, he played 43 games in the Pacific Coast League. His batting average was only .200, but he set another single-game league record when he had six assists as a first baseman on May 26. That PCL mark has never been surpassed as of 2010.

Kemmer played in a different minor league every year from 1906 to 1910. After batting .200 in 1910, he retired from professional baseball.

Bill Kemmer died in 1945 in Washington, D.C.
