= Chick Pedroes =

Cuban baseball player (1869–1927)

- Outfielder
- Born: October 27, 1869; Havana, Cuba
- Died: August 6, 1927 (aged 57); Chicago, Illinois, U.S.
- Batted: Unknown Threw: Unknown

MLB debut
- August 21, 1902, for the Chicago Orphans

Last MLB appearance
- August 22, 1902, for the Chicago Orphans

MLB statistics
- Batting average: .000
- Home runs: 0
- Runs batted in: 0
- Stats at Baseball Reference

Teams
- Chicago Orphans (1902)

Charles P. Pedroes (October 27, 1869 – August 6, 1927) was a Cuban Major League Baseball (MLB) outfielder in 1902. He was the first Cuban-born player in MLB history.
