= Joe Hughes (baseball) =

American baseball player (1880-1951)

- Outfielder
- Born: February 21, 1880; Pardo, Pennsylvania, U.S.
- Died: March 13, 1951 (aged 71); Cleveland, Ohio, U.S.
- Batted: Right Threw: Right

MLB debut
- August 30, 1902, for the Chicago Orphans

Last MLB appearance
- August 30, 1902, for the Chicago Orphans

MLB statistics
- Batting average: .000
- Home runs: 0
- Runs batted in: 0
- Stats at Baseball Reference

Teams
- Chicago Orphans (1902)

Joseph Thompson Hughes (February 21, 1880 – March 13, 1951) was an American Major League Baseball outfielder for the Chicago Orphans in 1902. He went to college at Geneva College. According to Sporting Life correspondent A.R. Cratty, due to injuries to the Orphans, Hughes shared time in right field during a series against the Pittsburgh Pirates with Hillebrand, who also played his only Major League game the previous day. Cratty suggested that either Hillebrand or Hughes may have been the brother-in-law of long time Major League infielder Bobby Lowe, who was playing for the Orphans that season. Further research by Hughes' SABR biographer confirmed that Hughes was the brother-in-law. Lowe had married Hughes' sister Harriett.
