= Bob Blewett =

American baseball player (1877-1958)

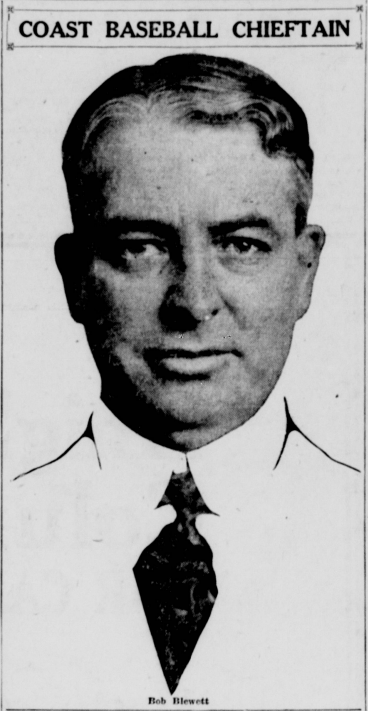
- Pitcher
- Born: June 28, 1877; Fond du Lac, Wisconsin, U.S.
- Died: March 17, 1958 (aged 80); Sedro-Woolley, Washington, U.S.
- Batted: Left Threw: Left

MLB debut
- June 17, 1902, for the New York Giants

Last MLB appearance
- July 14, 1902, for the New York Giants

MLB statistics
- Win–loss record: 0–2
- Earned run average: 4.82
- Strikeouts: 8
- Stats at Baseball Reference

Teams
- New York Giants (1902)

Bob Blewett (June 28, 1877 – March 17, 1958) was an American Major League Baseball player for the New York Giants in 1902 as a pitcher.

== Biography ==
Blewett was born Robert Lawrence Blewett on June 28, 1877, in Fond du Lac, Wisconsin. He attended Beloit College. Blewett died on March 17, 1958, in Sedro Woolley, Washington.

Blewett served as president of the Pacific Coast League, circa 1918.
