= Jim St. Vrain =

American baseball player (1871-1937)

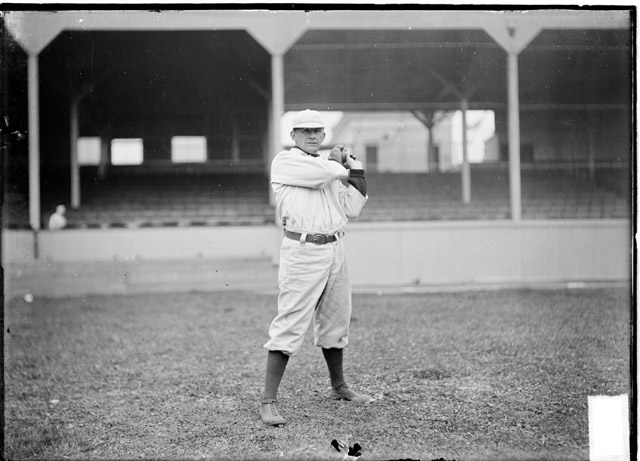
- Pitcher
- Born: June 6, 1871; Ralls County, Missouri, U.S.
- Died: June 12, 1937 (aged 66); Butte, Montana, U.S.
- Batted: Right Threw: Left

MLB debut
- April 20, 1902, for the Chicago Orphans

Last MLB appearance
- June 14, 1902, for the Chicago Orphans

MLB statistics
- Win–loss record: 4–6
- Earned run average: 2.08
- Strikeouts: 51
- Stats at Baseball Reference

Teams
- Chicago Orphans (1902)

James Marcellin St. Vrain (June 6, 1871 – June 12, 1937), a native of Ralls County, Missouri, was an American Major League Baseball (MLB) pitcher. The left-hander played for the Chicago Orphans in 1902.

St. Vrain made his major league debut in a road game against the Cincinnati Reds at the Palace of the Fans (April 20, 1902). He pitched well, but the Orphans lost 2–1. His first major league win came against the New York Giants on May 9. He pitched a 5–0 complete game shutout in front of the home crowd at West Side Park.

St. Vrain pitched well during his only season but gave up a lot of unearned runs. He is also remembered for running the wrong way on the bases; although he was a left-handed pitcher, St. Vrain batted right-handed. One day, manager Frank Selee suggested he try batting left-handed, and upon making contact with the ball, St. Vrain was confused enough to run to third base (he was thrown out at first base).

In a total of 12 games, 11 starts, 10 complete games, and 95 innings pitched, he had 51 strikeouts and only 25 walks, and gave up just 22 earned runs. Though his record was 4–6, his earned run average was a sparkling 2.08.

St. Vrain died in Butte, Montana, in 1937.
