= Fred Postal =

Baseball owner

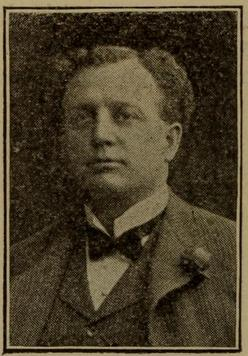
Fred Postal in 1902.

Frederick Postal was the co-owner of the Washington Senators of the American League with Ban Johnson from 1901 through 1903. In 1903, Johnson and Postal sold the Senators to Thomas C. Noyes.
