= Jim Jackson (baseball) =

American baseball player (1877-1955)

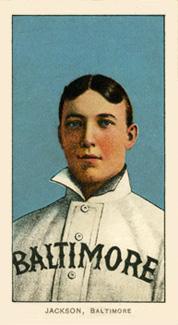
- Outfielder
- Born: November 28, 1877; Philadelphia, Pennsylvania, US
- Died: October 9, 1955 (aged 77); Philadelphia, Pennsylvania, US
- Batted: Right Threw: Right

MLB debut
- April 26, 1901, for the Baltimore Orioles

Last MLB appearance
- September 28, 1906, for the Cleveland Naps

MLB statistics
- Batting average: .235
- Runs: 159
- RBI: 132
- Stats at Baseball Reference

Teams
- Baltimore Orioles (1901); New York Giants (1902); Cleveland Naps (1905–1906)

James Benner Jackson (November 28, 1877 – October 9, 1955) was an American Major League Baseball outfielder. He played for the Baltimore Orioles, the New York Giants, and the Cleveland Naps (now known as the Cleveland Guardians) during the early 1900s. In three hundred and forty-eight career games, he had a .235 batting average with three hundred hits in 1,274 at-bats. He was right-handed.

In 1902, he was described by The Pittsburgh Press as "the brilliant center fielder of the Orioles."

== Formative years ==
Born in Philadelphia, Pennsylvania on November 28, 1877, Jackson attended the University of Pennsylvania.

== Career ==
During his three hundred and forty-eight-game career, Jackson played for multiple National League teams, including the Baltimore Orioles, the New York Giants, and the Cleveland Naps in 1901 and 1902, and again from 1905 to 1906. He batted and threw right-handed.

== Death ==
Jackson died in Philadelphia on October 9, 1955.
