= John Burke (1900s pitcher) =

American baseball player (1877-1950)

- Pitcher / Outfielder
- Born: January 27, 1877; Hazleton, Pennsylvania, U.S.
- Died: August 4, 1950 (aged 73); Jersey City, New Jersey, U.S.
- Batted: Right Threw: Right

MLB debut
- June 27, 1902, for the New York Giants

Last MLB appearance
- July 15, 1902, for the New York Giants

MLB statistics
- Win–loss record: 0–1
- Earned run average: 5.79
- Strikeouts: 3
- Stats at Baseball Reference

Teams
- New York Giants (1902)

John Patrick Burke (January 27, 1877 – August 4, 1950) was an American pitcher and outfielder in Major League Baseball. He went to St. Bonaventure University and played for the New York Giants in 1902.
