= Malcolm MacDonald (baseball) =

American baseball player (1872-1946)

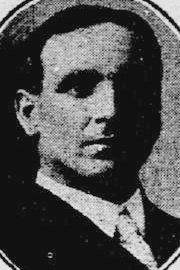
- Outfielder
- Born: January 1, 1872; Philadelphia, Pennsylvania, U.S.
- Died: June 2, 1946 (aged 74); Ocean Gate, New Jersey, U.S.
- Batted: Right Threw: Right

MLB debut
- June 2, 1902, for the New York Giants

Last MLB appearance
- June 3, 1902, for the New York Giants

MLB statistics
- Batting average: .333
- At bats: 9
- Hits: 3
- Runs batted in: 1
- Games played: 2
- Stats at Baseball Reference

Teams
- New York Giants (1902)

Malcolm MacDonald (1872-1946) was an American outfielder in Major League Baseball. He played for the New York Giants in the 1902 season.
