= Jim Callahan (baseball) =

American baseball player (1881-1968)

- Outfielder
- Born: January 12, 1881; Allegheny County, Pennsylvania, U.S.
- Died: March 9, 1968 (aged 87); Carnegie, Pennsylvania, U.S.
- Batted: Right Threw: Right

MLB debut
- May 25, 1902, for the New York Giants

Last MLB appearance
- May 25, 1902, for the New York Giants

MLB statistics
- Batting average: .000
- Home runs: 0
- Runs batted in: 0
- Stats at Baseball Reference

Teams
- New York Giants (1902)

James Timothy Callahan (January 12, 1881 – March 9, 1968) was an American outfielder in Major League Baseball. He played for the New York Giants in 1902.
