= Fred Smith (1900s pitcher) =

American baseball player (1878–1964)

- Pitcher
- Born: November 24, 1878; New Diggings, Wisconsin
- Died: February 4, 1964 (aged 85); Los Angeles, California
- Batted: Right Threw: Right

MLB debut
- June 14, 1907, for the Cincinnati Reds

Last MLB appearance
- September 21, 1907, for the Cincinnati Reds

MLB statistics
- Win–loss record: 2–7
- Earned run average: 2.85
- Strikeouts: 19
- Stats at Baseball Reference

Teams
- Cincinnati Reds (1907)

Frederick Smith (November 24, 1878 – February 4, 1964) was a professional baseball player. He was a right-handed pitcher for one season (1907) with the Cincinnati Reds.
