= Henry Thielman =

American baseball player (1880–1942)

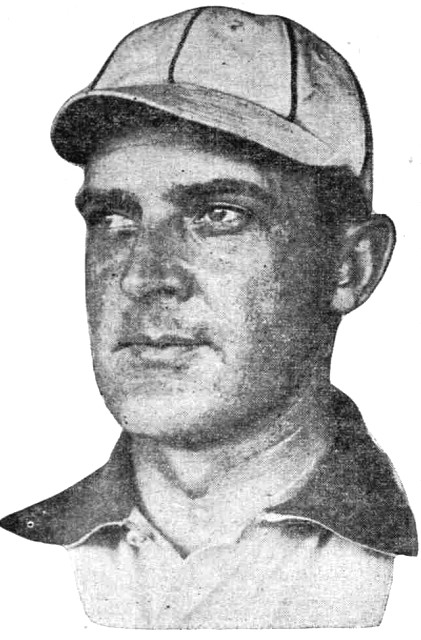
- Pitcher
- Born: October 3, 1880; St. Cloud, Minnesota, U.S.
- Died: September 2, 1942 (aged 61); New York, New York, U.S.
- Batted: Right Threw: Right

MLB debut
- April 17, 1902, for the New York Giants

Last MLB appearance
- May 15, 1903, for the Brooklyn Superbas

MLB statistics
- Win–loss record: 9–19
- Earned run average: 3.37
- Strikeouts: 64
- Stats at Baseball Reference

Teams
- New York Giants (1902); Cincinnati Reds (1902); Brooklyn Superbas (1903)

Henry Joseph Thielman (October 3, 1880 – September 2, 1942) was an American pitcher in Major League Baseball. He was born in St. Cloud, Minnesota and played baseball for local teams. He also attended the University of Notre Dame in 1900–1901 and played football there.

Thielman started his professional career in 1902 with the New York Giants. After being released in May, he finished out the season with the Cincinnati Reds, going 9-15 with a 3.24 earned run average.

Thielman was then purchased by the Brooklyn Superbas. He started out 1903 by losing his first three decisions, and he never pitched in the majors again. Thielman pitched for the Eastern League's Jersey City Skeeters from 1903–1906. After being released by Brooklyn, he went 23-5 for the Skeeters the rest of the season and led the EL in winning percentage. Jersey City cruised to the league championship. In 1903 and 1904, Thielman also coached the Manhattan Jaspers baseball team.

Thielman didn't play much after 1903, and he soon retired to become a dentist. He practiced dentistry in New York City.

Thielman's older brother, Jake Thielman, also pitched in the majors.
