= R. E. Hillebrand =

American baseball player

- Right fielder
- Born: unknown
- Died: unknown
- Batted: Unknown Threw: Unknown

MLB debut
- August 29, 1902, for the Chicago Orphans

Last MLB appearance
- August 29, 1902, for the Chicago Orphans

MLB statistics
- Games played: 1
- At bats: 4
- Hits: 0
- Stats at Baseball Reference

Teams
- Chicago Orphans (1902)

R. E. Hillebrand was an American baseball player. He played one game in Major League Baseball as a right fielder for the Chicago Orphans on August 29, 1902. He went hitless in four at bats, while scoring one run after a walk. The Chicago Inter Ocean described his debut as follows:

Manager Selee was on the mysterious lay today. In right field he had a young man who sailed under the name 'Hillebrand,' but wears a different title at home. The boy was so nervous that he could not stand still, but showed some good traits at the bat. There was nothing by which to gauge his ability as a fielder.

According to Sporting Life correspondent A.R. Cratty, due to injuries to the Orphans, Hillebrand shared time in right field during a series against the Pittsburgh Pirates with Joe Hughes, who also played his only Major League game the following day. W.A Phelon reported that after playing his one Major League game, Hillebrand was told that "while he had done no real hurt he need not stay." Cratty suggested that either Hillebrand or Hughes may have been the brother-in-law of longtime Major League infielder Bobby Lowe, who was playing for the Orphans that season.

Hillebrand is one of three 20th-century Major League Baseball players not to have a confirmed first name, the other two being Harrison of the 1901 Washington Senators (likely Leo J. Harrison) and Edwards of the 1915 Philadelphia Athletics.
