= Art Williams (outfielder) =

American baseball player (1877-1941)

- Outfielder/First baseman
- Born: August 26, 1877; Somerville, Massachusetts, U.S.
- Died: May 16, 1941 (aged 63); Arlington, Virginia, U.S.
- Batted: Left Threw: Right

MLB debut
- May 7, 1902, for the Chicago Orphans

Last MLB appearance
- September 1, 1902, for the Chicago Orphans

MLB statistics
- Batting average: .228
- Home runs: 0
- Runs batted in: 14
- Stats at Baseball Reference

Teams
- Chicago Orphans (1902)

Arthur Franklin Williams (August 26, 1877 – May 16, 1941) was an American first baseman/right fielder who played briefly for the Chicago Orphans during the 1902 season. Williams batted left-handed and threw right-handed. A native of Somerville, Massachusetts, he attended Tufts University.

In one season career, Williams was a .231 hitter (37-for-160) with 17 runs and 14 RBI in 47 games, including three doubles and nine stolen bases without home runs.

Williams died in Arlington, Virginia, at the age of 63.
