= Frank Leary =

American baseball player (1881–1907)

- Pitcher
- Born: February 26, 1881; Wayland, Massachusetts, U.S.
- Died: October 4, 1907 (aged 26); Natick, Massachusetts, U.S.
- Batted: Unknown Threw: Right

MLB debut
- April 30, 1907, for the Cincinnati Reds

Last MLB appearance
- May 5, 1907, for the Cincinnati Reds

MLB statistics
- Win–loss record: 0–1
- Earned run average: 1.13
- Strikeouts: 4
- Stats at Baseball Reference

Teams
- Cincinnati Reds (1907)

Francis Patrick Leary (February 26, 1881 – October 4, 1907) was an American pitcher in Major League Baseball. He played for the Cincinnati Reds in 1907.
