= Bill McCarthy (baseball) =

American baseball player (1886–1928)

- Catcher
- Born: February 14, 1886; Boston, Massachusetts, U.S.
- Died: February 4, 1928 (aged 41); Washington, D.C., U.S.
- Batted: Unknown Threw: Right

MLB debut
- June 5, 1905, for the Boston Beaneaters

Last MLB appearance
- September 14, 1907, for the Cincinnati Reds

MLB statistics
- Games played: 4
- At bats: 11
- Hits: 1
- Stats at Baseball Reference

Teams
- Boston Beaneaters (1905); Cincinnati Reds (1907)

William John McCarthy (February 14, 1886 – February 4, 1928) was an American professional baseball catcher. He played parts of two seasons in Major League Baseball, for the Boston Beaneaters in 1905 and the Cincinnati Reds in 1907. He attended Fordham University.
