= Jack Robinson (catcher) =

American baseball player (1880-1921)

- Catcher
- Born: July 15, 1880; Portland, Maine, U.S.
- Died: July 22, 1921 (aged 41); Macon, Georgia, U.S.
- Batted: Unknown Threw: Right

MLB debut
- September 6, 1902, for the New York Giants

Last MLB appearance
- October 3, 1902, for the New York Giants

MLB statistics
- Games played: 4
- At bats: 9
- Hits: 0
- Stats at Baseball Reference

Teams
- New York Giants (1902)

John W. Robinson (July 15, 1880 – July 22, 1921) was an American Major League Baseball player. Robinson played for the New York Giants in 1902.

Robinson attended Harvard University, where he played college baseball for the Crimson from 1899–1902.

He was born in Portland, Maine and died in Macon, Georgia.
