= Frank Selee =

American baseball manager (1859–1909)

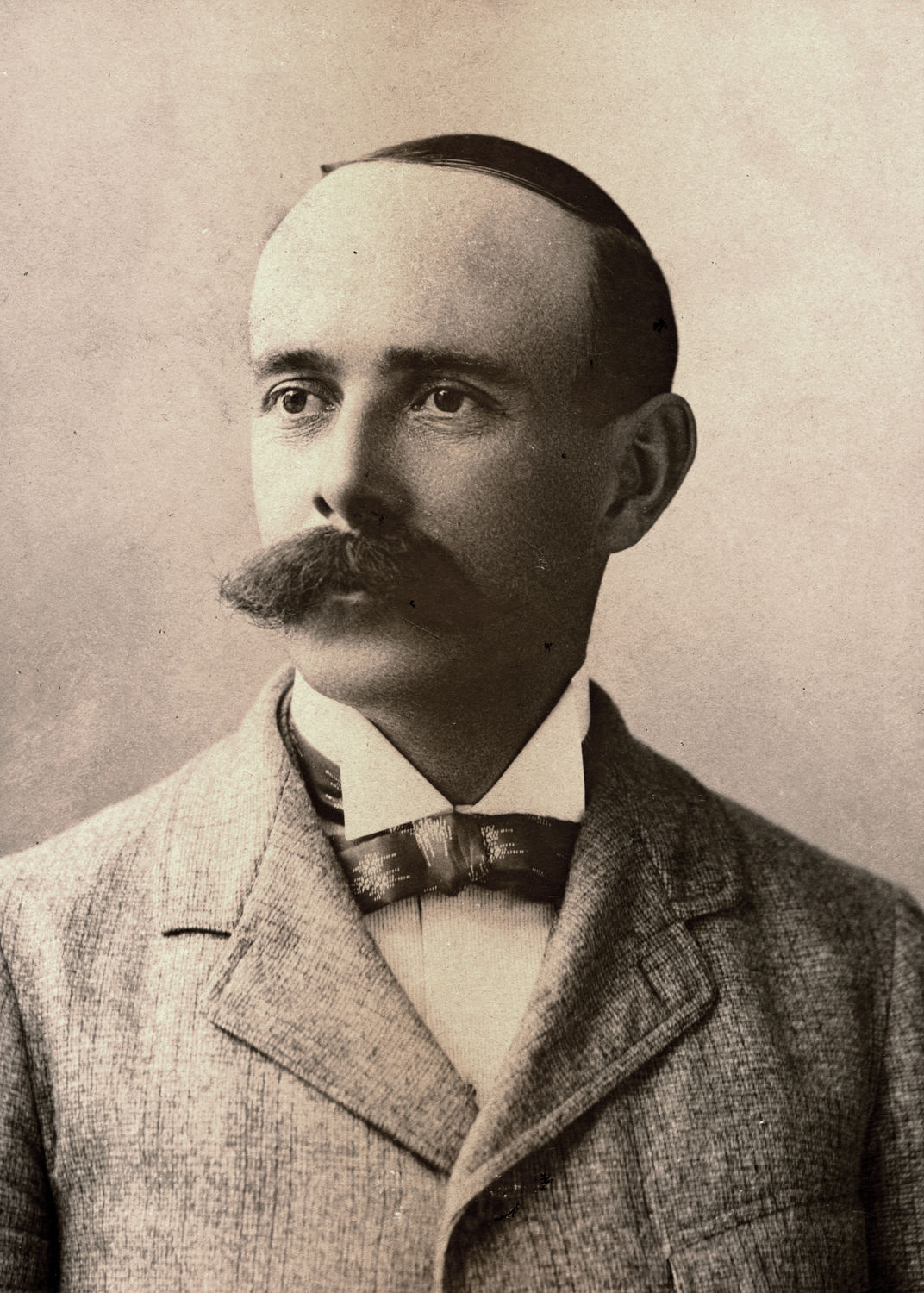
- Manager
- Born: October 26, 1859; Amherst, New Hampshire, U.S.
- Died: July 5, 1909 (aged 49); Denver, Colorado, U.S.

MLB debut
- April 19, 1890, for the Boston Beaneaters

Last MLB appearance
- June 27, 1905, for the Chicago Cubs

MLB statistics
- Games managed: 2,180
- Managerial record: 1,284–862–34
- Winning %: .598

Teams
- Boston Beaneaters (1890–1901); Chicago Orphans / Cubs (1902–1905)

Career highlights and awards
- 5× NL champion (1891–1893, 1897, 1898)

Member of the National

Baseball Hall of Fame
- Induction: 1999
- Election method: Veterans Committee

Frank Gibson Selee (October 26, 1859 – July 5, 1909) was an American Major League Baseball manager in the National League (NL). In his 16-year Major League career, he managed the Boston Beaneaters (1890–1901) and Chicago Orphans / Cubs (1902–1905), winning 1,284 games. Selee managed the Beaneaters during their 1890s run of five NL championships. His 1892 and 1898 teams each won 100 games, becoming the first teams to ever achieve the mark in baseball history (only one other team achieved the feat in the 19th century); their 102 wins in each season would not be surpassed by a National League team until 1902. After joining the Orphans, he helped build the team that would become the Cubs dynasty of the 1900s. He was elected to the National Baseball Hall of Fame in 1999.

== Early life ==
Selee was born in Amherst, New Hampshire. He was described as a "balding little man with a modest demeanor and a formidable mustache that gave his face a melancholy cast", and was shy and reticent in public. Selee left a job at a watch manufacturer in Waltham, Massachusetts, in 1884 to form a minor league team in the Massachusetts State League. In 1885 and 1886, he managed the Haverhill team in the New England League. The following year Selee managed the Oshkosh, Wisconsin based Oshkosh Indians franchise in the Northwest League, winning the league championship. In 1888 he was hired to manage at the Omaha Omahogs in the Western Association. In 1889 he led Omaha to the pennant while posting the highest team winning percentage in all of organized baseball, after signing a teenage Kid Nichols to the Omaha roster. Selee's managerial success in the minor leagues propelled him to the major leagues in 1890.

== Major league managerial career ==
=== Boston Beaneaters ===
Selee was a rare 19th century major league manager who did not double as a player or rise from the ranks of former players. His only experiences playing professional baseball were brief roster appearances with minor league teams in Waltham and Lawrence, Massachusetts, in 1884. Thereafter his only professional role was as manager.

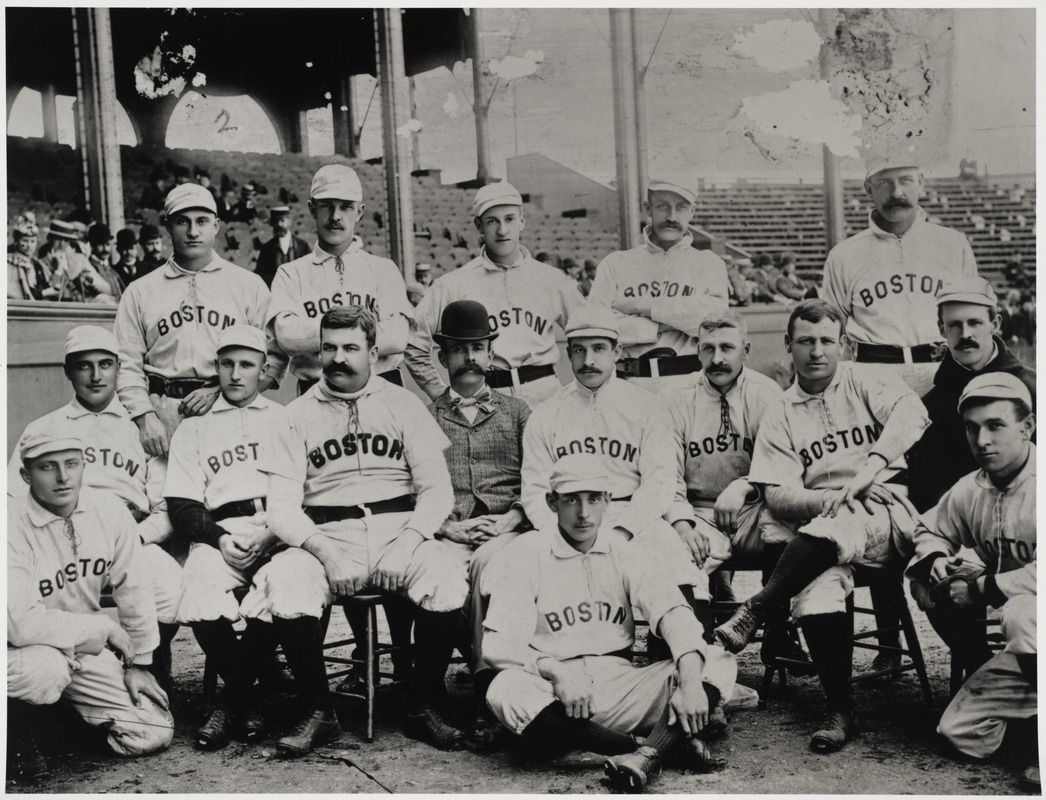
Selee (middle row, fourth from left) with the 1892 Boston Beaneaters

In Selee's first season, he signed Kid Nichols to a major league contract and the Beaneaters finished with a 76–57–1 record, 12 games behind the Brooklyn Bridegrooms. In the following year, the schedule increased to 140 games. His team finished 87–51–2, while winning the National League pennant by 3 1/2 games over the Chicago Colts, their first pennant since 1883. In 1892, the schedule increased to 150 games, while having a split season. The Beaneaters went 102–48–2 overall while winning the first half of the season, with the Cleveland Spiders winning the second half; the two teams played a "World's Championship Series" at the end of the season, with Boston winning five of the seven games played. They were the first team to ever win 100 games in a single season. In 1893, the Beaneaters went 86–43–2 while winning the league pennant for the third consecutive year, winning by five games over the Pittsburgh Pirates.

The 1894 season was a disappointment. Though the team had a winning record (83-49), they finished in third place, eight games behind the Baltimore Orioles. The following year, the team went 71–60–2 while finishing in a tie for fifth place with the Brooklyn Grooms and 16 1/2 games behind the Orioles. The team rebounded a bit the following year, finishing 74-57-1 and in fourth place, although it was 17 games back of the Orioles. The 1897 season was a return to prominence as they went 93–39–3 while winning the National League pennant by two games over the Orioles. This was their fourth league pennant. After the season, the two teams played in the Temple Cup, with Boston losing in five games. The 1898 team went 102–47–3 while winning the league pennant once again, doing so by six games over the Orioles. This was the fifth and final pennant for Selee and the Beaneaters. As it turned out, it was the peak of his tenure with the team.

The following year the team went 95–57–1, placing second behind Brooklyn. The team finished the 1900 season in fourth place with a record of 66–72–4, the first sub-.500 season under Selee's reign and the first for the team since 1886. He closed out his tenure with the Beaneaters in 1901 with a 69–69–2 record and a fifth place finish (20 1/2 games behind the Pirates). On September 20, he won his 1,000th career game, doing so in the second game of a doubleheader with the Chicago Orphans, winning 7–0. During his years with Boston, he won 1,004 games and lost 649, with 24 ties.

=== Chicago Orphans / Cubs ===
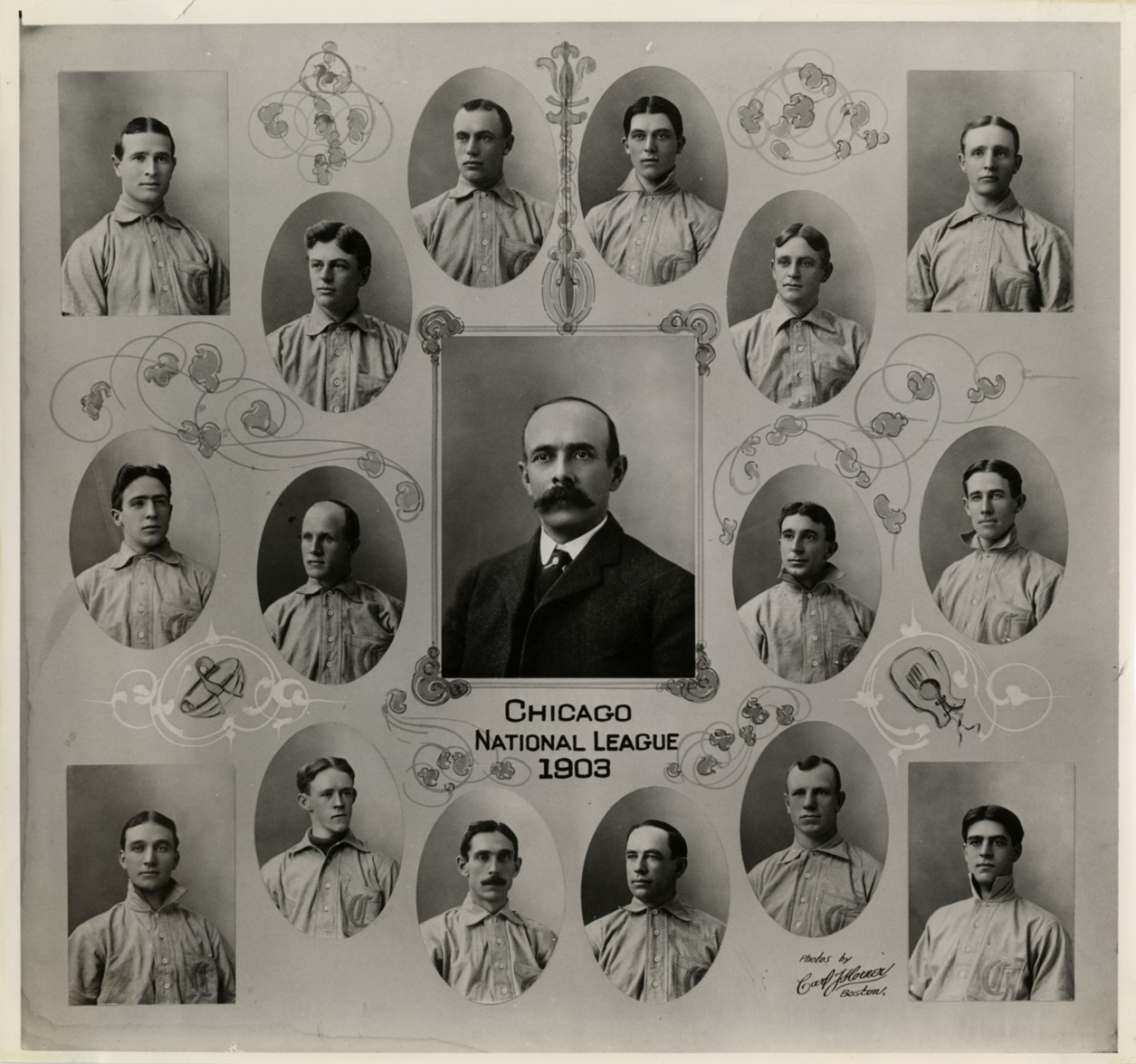
Selee (middle row, center) with the 1903 Chicago Cubs

In 1902, Selee was hired to manage the Chicago Orphans (which served as a name after the team fired famed manager Cap Anson, although they were also known as "Remnants"). Selee managed them to a 68–69–6 record, finishing in fifth place (34 games behind the Pirates), which was an improvement from the team's 53–86 record the previous year. The following year the team (in their first season referred to as "Cubs" in print) improved to an 82–56–1 record, finishing in 3rd place, eight games behind the pennant-winning Pirates. They improved to a 93–60–3 record in Selee's third season, finishing in second place, 13 games behind the New York Giants.

With the Cubs, Selee developed the famous Tinker-to-Evers-to-Chance infield combination, by converting Frank Chance from catcher to first base, Joe Tinker from third base to shortstop, and Johnny Evers from shortstop to second base. Selee also traded two players to the St. Louis Cardinals to acquire a rookie pitcher named Mordecai "Three Finger" Brown; Brown became a major factor in the Cubs' post-Selee success and went on to a Hall of Fame career.

The 1905 season was Selee's last in the majors, as he resigned in June due to illness; at the time, the Cubs had a record of 37–28, and Chance would lead them to a 92–61 record. It was the third straight season they had finished in the top three in the National League, which was the first time they had three consecutive seasons of first division finishes since the 1885–1891 seasons. Chance would lead the Cubs to four National League titles and two World Series victories during his tenure. The last Cubs' championship under Chance was in 1910; eight of the top thirteen players from the 1905 squad were major contributors on that 1910 club.

== Later life and legacy ==
Selee managed the Pueblo Indians of the minor league Western League from 1906 to 1908. The team had a losing record each year and never finished higher than fifth place. In 1909, Selee died of consumption (tuberculosis) at the age of 49 in Denver, Colorado, and was interred at Wyoming Cemetery in Melrose, Massachusetts.

In total, Selee had 1,284 victories in 2,180 games as a manager during his 16-year MLB career, with a winning percentage of .598. Twelve of his players went on to be inducted into the Baseball Hall of Fame. Selee was noted for his ability to assess and hire talented players, which helped earn him five NL titles with the Beaneaters. He repeated the feat in Chicago, where he built the basis for the Cubs' later success by signing and developing the talents of Frank Chance, Joe Tinker, and Johnny Evers, among others. Baseball historian David Nemec wrote that Selee had "a flair for bending players acquired from here, there and everywhere. [He was] a master at putting together a team better than the sum of its parts."

In 1999, Selee was elected to the Baseball Hall of Fame by the Veterans Committee for his achievements as a manager. According to his bio at the Hall of Fame, "Contrary to the rough tactics of rival clubs like the Baltimore Orioles, Selee encouraged his players to play a more civilized style. His teams surpassed brawnier opponents by hitting behind runners, employing the bunt and utilizing the double steal." Selee is one of only two people from New Hampshire to be inducted into the Hall of Fame; the other is Carlton Fisk, who was enshrined in 2000.

Selee appeared as a character in the 1991 episode "Batter Up" of the animated Back to the Future series, which involved Marty McFly and the Brown children traveling back to 1897 to help one of Marty's ancestors, a player for the Beaneaters, to improve his game. Selee was portrayed without his well-known mustache.

== Managerial record ==
Team	Year	Regular season					Postseason			
Team	Year	Games	Won	Lost	Win %	Finish	Won	Lost	Win %	Result
BOS	1890	134	76	57	.571	5th in NL	–	–	–	–
BOS	1891	140	87	51	.630	1st in NL	–	–	–	–
BOS	1892	77	50	26	.658	1st in NL	-	-	-	-
BOS	1892	75	52	22	.703	2nd in NL	5	0	1.000 (Note: Game 1 ended in a tie)	Won World Series (CLE)
BOS	1893	131	86	43	.667	1st in NL	-	-	-	-
BOS	1894	133	83	49	.629	3rd in NL	–	–	–	–
BOS	1895	133	71	60	.542	6th in NL	–	–	–	–
BOS	1896	132	74	57	.565	4th in NL	–	–	–	–
BOS	1897	135	93	39	.705	1st in NL	1	4	.200	Lost Temple Cup (BAL)
BOS	1898	152	102	47	.685	1st in NL	–	–	–	–
BOS	1899	153	95	57	.625	2nd in NL	–	–	–	–
BOS	1900	142	66	72	.478	4th in NL	–	–	–	–
BOS	1901	140	69	69	.500	5th in NL	–	–	–	–
CHC	1902	143	68	69	.496	5th in NL	–	–	–	–
CHC	1903	139	82	56	.594	3rd in NL	–	–	–	–
CHC	1904	156	93	60	.608	2nd in NL	–	–	–	–
CHC	1905	65	37	28	.569	3rd in NL	–	–	–	–
Total (Note: Selee also managed in 34 games that ended in ties)		2,180	1284	862	.598		6	4	.600	

== See also ==
- List of Major League Baseball managers with most career wins
- Honor Rolls of Baseball
