= Dusty Miller (1900s outfielder) =

American baseball player (1876-1950)

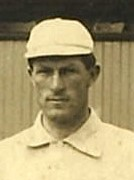
- Miller in 1902
- Left fielder
- Born: September 3, 1876; Malvern, Iowa, U.S.
- Died: April 19, 1950 (aged 73); Stockton, California, U.S.
- Batted: Left Threw: Right

MLB debut
- April 17, 1902, for the Chicago Orphans

Last MLB appearance
- July 22, 1902, for the Chicago Orphans

MLB statistics
- Batting average: .246
- Home runs: 0
- Runs batted in: 13
- Stats at Baseball Reference

Teams
- Chicago Orphans (1902)

Dakin Evans "Dusty" Miller (September 3, 1876 – April 19, 1950) was an American professional baseball player. He played 51 games in Major League Baseball for the Chicago Orphans in 1902, primarily as a left fielder.
