= Pete Lamer =

American baseball player (1873–1931)

- Catcher
- Born: December 27, 1873; New York, New York, U.S.
- Died: October 24, 1931 (aged 57); Brooklyn, New York, U.S.
- Batted: Unknown Threw: Right

MLB debut
- September 10, 1902, for the Chicago Orphans

Last MLB appearance
- August 20, 1907, for the Cincinnati Reds

MLB statistics
- Batting average: .182
- Home runs: 0
- Runs batted in: 0
- Stats at Baseball Reference

Teams
- Chicago Orphans (1902); Cincinnati Reds (1907)

Pierre Lamer (December 27, 1873 – October 24, 1931) was an American professional baseball player. He played parts of two seasons in Major League Baseball, for the Chicago Orphans in 1902 and the Cincinnati Reds in 1907, primarily as a catcher.
