= Alex Hardy =

Canadian baseball player (1877–1940)

- Pitcher
- Born: September 29, 1877; Toronto, Ontario, Canada
- Died: April 22, 1940 (aged 62); Toronto, Ontario, Canada
- Batted: Right Threw: Left

MLB debut
- September 4, 1902, for the Chicago Orphans

Last MLB appearance
- May 9, 1903, for the Chicago Cubs

MLB statistics
- Win–loss record: 3–3
- Earned run average: 4.34
- Strikeouts: 16
- Stats at Baseball Reference

Teams
- Chicago Orphans/Cubs (1902–1903)

David Alexander Hardy (September 29, 1877 – April 22, 1940) was a Canadian pitcher in Major League Baseball in the early twentieth century. He played for the Chicago Cubs of the National League in 1902 and 1903.

In July 1905, while playing for the minor league Troy Trojans, Hardy was shot in the chest in Troy, New York by a man who suspected him of having an affair with his wife. The bullet "lodged near his heart" but did not prevent him from playing in the minors until 1909.
