= Chick Autry (first baseman) =

American baseball player (1885–1976)

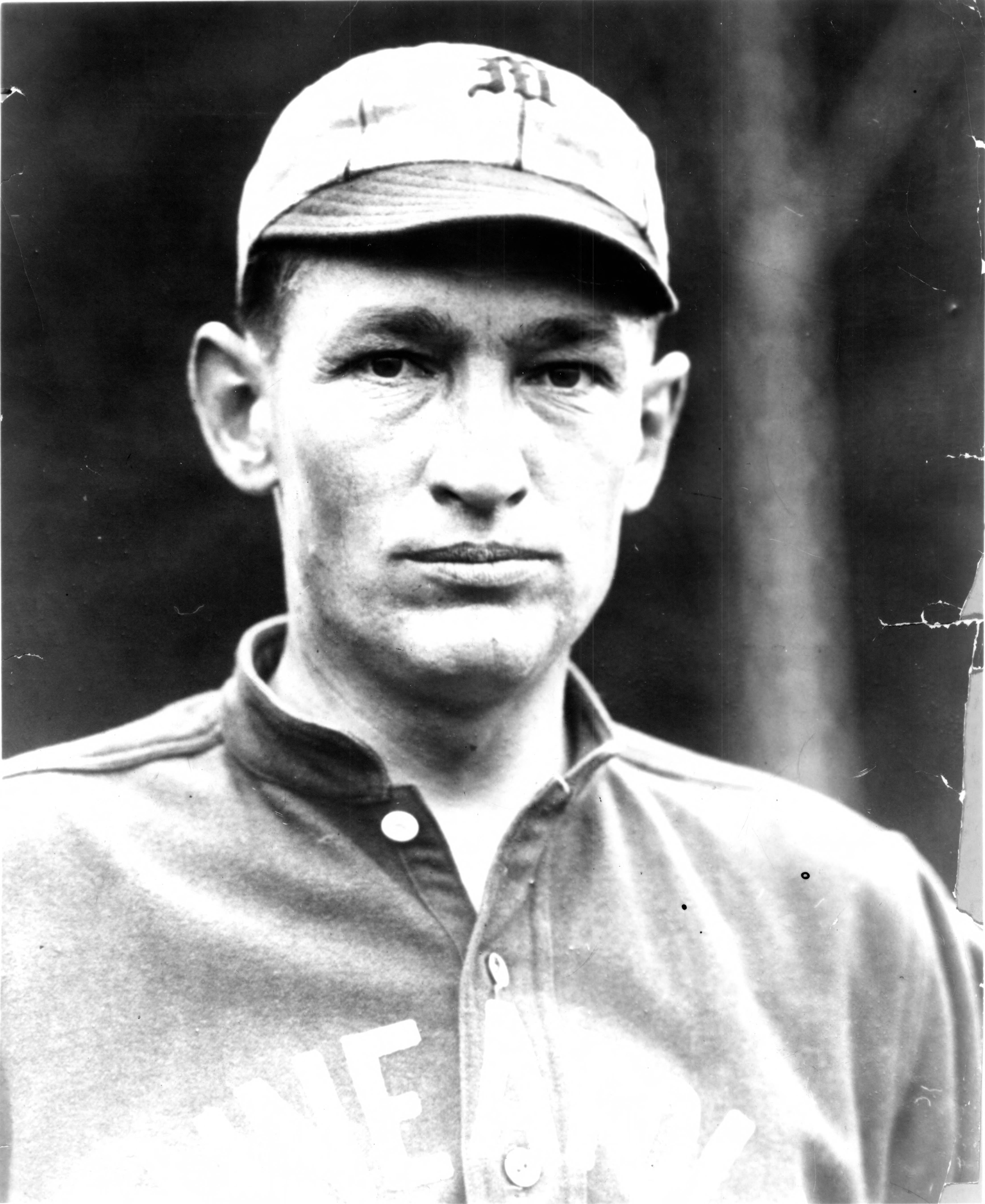
- First baseman
- Born: January 2, 1885; Humboldt, Tennessee, U.S.
- Died: January 16, 1976 (aged 91); Santa Rosa, California, U.S.
- Batted: Right Threw: Right

MLB debut
- September 18, 1907, for the Cincinnati Reds

Last MLB appearance
- October 7, 1909, for the Boston Doves

MLB statistics
- Batting average: .195
- Home runs: 0
- Runs batted in: 17
- Stats at Baseball Reference

Teams
- Cincinnati Reds (1907, 1909); Boston Doves (1909)

William Askew Autry (January 2, 1885 – January 16, 1976) was an American utility first baseman and outfielder in Major League Baseball who played in 1907 and 1909 for the Cincinnati Reds (1907) and Boston Doves (1909). Listed at 5' 11", 168 lb., Autry batted and threw left-handed. He was born in Humboldt, Tennessee.

In a two-season career, Autry was a .195 hitter (50-for-257) with 22 runs and 17 RBI in 81 games, including six doubles and six stolen bases. He did not hit a home run.

At first base, Autry posted a .989 fielding percentage with just eight errors in 701 chances. He made 12 outfield appearances at left (8) and center (4), committing one error in 31 chances for a collective .968 F%.

Autry died in Santa Rosa, California at age 91.

== Sources ==
- Career statistics from Baseball Reference · Baseball Reference (Minors) · Retrosheet · Baseball Almanac
