= Dad Clark (baseball player) =

American baseball player (1873-1956)

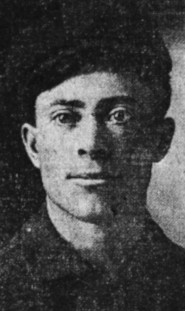
- First baseman
- Born: July 16, 1873; San Francisco, California, U.S.
- Died: July 26, 1956 (aged 83); Augusta, Maine, U.S.
- Batted: Left Threw: Left

MLB debut
- July 3, 1902, for the Chicago Orphans

Last MLB appearance
- August 28, 1902, for the Chicago Orphans

MLB statistics
- Batting average: .186
- Home runs: 0
- Runs batted in: 2
- Stats at Baseball Reference

Teams
- Chicago Cubs (1902)

Alfred Robert "Dad" Clark (July 16, 1873 – July 26, 1956) was an American professional baseball player. Clark played part of one season in Major League Baseball for the Chicago Orphans in 1902. He played in 12 games, collecting 8 hits in 43 at-bats, totaling a .186 batting average. He played for the Monmouth Browns (Illinois-Missouri (minor) League) in 1910. Along with his nickname "Dad", Clark also was known as "Fred", a shortened version of Alfred.
