= Mike Jacobs (shortstop) =

American baseball player (1876–1949)

- Shortstop
- Born: April 17, 1876; Louisville, Kentucky, U.S.
- Died: March 26, 1949 (aged 72); Louisville, Kentucky, U.S.

MLB debut
- July 16, 1902, for the Chicago Orphans

Last MLB appearance
- July 22, 1902, for the Chicago Orphans

MLB statistics
- Batting average: .211
- Home runs: 0
- Runs batted in: 2
- Stats at Baseball Reference

Teams
- Chicago Orphans (1902)

Morris Elmore "Mike" Jacobs (April 17, 1876 – March 26, 1949) was an American Major League Baseball shortstop. He played five games for the Chicago Orphans in 1902.

== Sources ==
- Career statistics from Baseball Reference · Baseball Reference (Minors) · Retrosheet · Baseball Almanac
