= List of Los Angeles Dodgers seasons =

Los Angeles Dodgers
Franchise History
- Established: 1883 (as the Brooklyn Grays)
- Major League: Major League Baseball
- Current League/Division: National League / National League West
- Seasons Played: 142 (as of the 2025 season)

Accomplishments
- World Series Titles: 9
- League Pennants: 27 (NL and AA)
- Division Titles: 23

The Los Angeles Dodgers are a Major League Baseball franchise that competes in the National League. The Dodgers have won nine World Series, 27 pennants (including one from their days in the American Association), and 23 National League West titles. Their worst season was the 1992 season, when their record was 63 wins and 99 losses. The most wins the Dodgers ever had in a season was 111, which occurred in 2022.

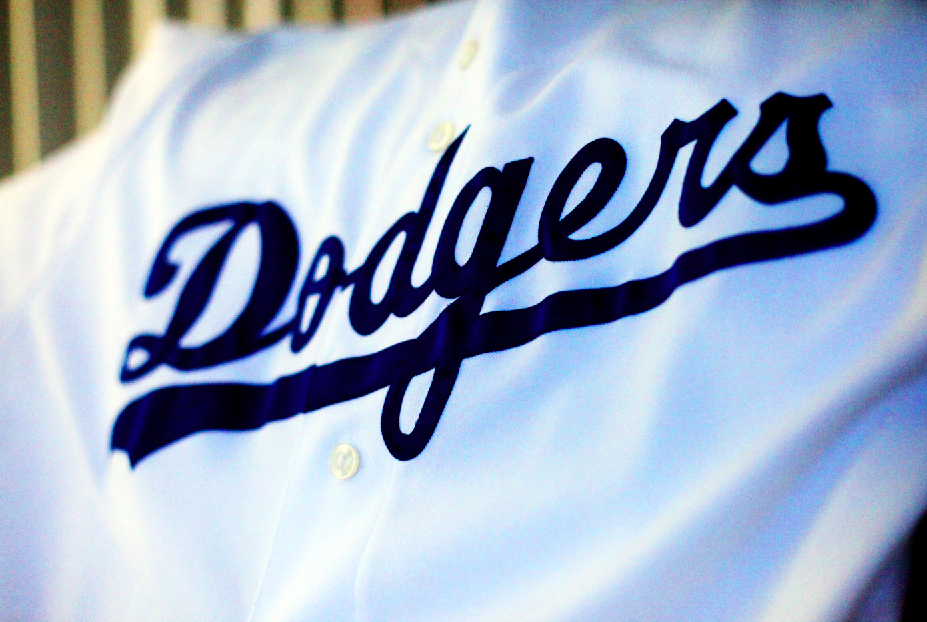
The Dodgers' home uniform with the iconic cursive font.

The Dodgers have had multiple periods of sustained excellence. The franchise’s first successful period, between 1947 (Jackie Robinson’s first season) through 1966 (Sandy Koufax's final season), featured four championships (1955, 1959, 1963, 1965), and ten World Series appearances (1947, 1949, 1952, 1953, 1955, 1959, 1963, 1965, 1966). Their next period of sustained success was from 1973–1988, which was overseen by the end of Walter Alston's managerial career (manager from 1954–1976) and of most of Tommy Lasorda's (1976–1996). During this fifteen-year period, the team won two championships (1981, 1988), five pennants (1974, 1977, 1978, 1981, 1988), and seven National League West division titles. The team's two consecutive 89-loss seasons in 1986 and 1987 were followed by an improbable World Championship in 1988; the 1988 championship was highlighted by Kirk Gibson's walk-off home run in Game 1 of the World Series, which was named the greatest moment in team history by the Los Angeles Times. Currently, the Dodgers have won three World Series titles since 2020, which includes the franchise's first back-to-back championships in 2024 and 2025, and have made the playoffs every season since 2013.

== Season-by-season records ==
Pre-World Series Champions (1884–1891) †	World Series Champions (1903–present) ‡	NL Champions (1892–present)^{[c]} *	Division champions (1969–present) ^	Wild card berth (1994–present) ¤

Season	Level	League	Division	Finish	Wins	Losses	Win%	GB	Playoffs	Awards
Brooklyn Grays
1883	N/A	IA†		1st	44	28	.611	—		
Brooklyn Atlantics
1884	MLB	AA		9th	40	64	.385	33½		
Brooklyn Grays
1885	MLB	AA		5th	53	59	.473	26		
1886	MLB	AA		3rd	76	61	.555	16		
1887	MLB	AA		6th	60	74	.448	34½		
Brooklyn Bridegrooms
1888	MLB	AA		2nd	88	52	.629	6½		
1889	MLB	AA †		1st	93	44	.679	—	Lost World Series (Giants) 6–3	
1890	MLB	NL †		1st	86	43	.667	—	Tied World Series (Colonels) 3–3–1	
Brooklyn Grooms
1891	MLB	NL		6th	61	76	.455	25½		
1892	MLB	NL		3rd	95	59	.617	9		
1893	MLB	NL		7th	65	63	.508	20½		
1894	MLB	NL		5th	70	61	.534	20½		
1895	MLB	NL		5th	71	60	.542	16½		
Brooklyn Bridegrooms
1896	MLB	NL		10th	58	73	.443	33		
1897	MLB	NL		7th	61	71	.462	32		
1898	MLB	NL		10th	54	91	.372	46		
Brooklyn Superbas
1899	MLB	NL †		1st	101	47	.682	—		
1900	MLB	NL †		1st	82	54	.603	—	Won Chronicle-Telegraph Cup (Pirates) 4–1 †	
1901	MLB	NL		3rd	79	57	.581	9½		
1902	MLB	NL		2nd	75	63	.543	27½		
1903	MLB	NL		5th	70	66	.515	19		
1904	MLB	NL		6th	56	97	.366	50		
1905	MLB	NL		8th	48	104	.316	56½		
1906	MLB	NL		5th	66	86	.434	50		
1907	MLB	NL		5th	65	83	.439	40		
1908	MLB	NL		7th	53	101	.344	46		
1909	MLB	NL		6th	55	98	.359	55½		
1910	MLB	NL		6th	64	90	.416	40		
Brooklyn Trolley Dodgers
1911	MLB	NL		7th	64	86	.427	33½		
1912	MLB	NL		7th	58	95	.379	46		
Brooklyn Dodgers
1913	MLB	NL		6th	65	84	.436	34½		Jake Daubert (MVP)
Brooklyn Robins
1914	MLB	NL		5th	75	79	.487	19½		
1915	MLB	NL		3rd	80	72	.526	10		
1916	MLB	NL *		1st	94	60	.610	—	Lost World Series (Red Sox) 4–1 *	
1917	MLB	NL		7th	70	81	.464	26½		
1918	MLB	NL		5th	57	69	.452	25½		
1919	MLB	NL		5th	69	71	.493	27		
1920	MLB	NL *		1st	93	61	.604	—	Lost World Series (Indians) 5–2 *	
1921	MLB	NL		5th	77	75	.507	16½		
1922	MLB	NL		6th	76	78	.494	17		
1923	MLB	NL		6th	76	78	.494	19½		
1924	MLB	NL		2nd	92	62	.597	1½		Dazzy Vance (MVP, TC)
1925	MLB	NL		7th	68	85	.444	27		
1926	MLB	NL		6th	71	82	.464	17½		
1927	MLB	NL		6th	65	88	.425	28½		
1928	MLB	NL		6th	77	76	.503	17½		
1929	MLB	NL		6th	70	83	.458	28½		
1930	MLB	NL		4th	86	68	.558	6		
1931	MLB	NL		4th	79	73	.520	21		
Brooklyn Dodgers
1932	MLB	NL		3rd	81	73	.526	9		
1933	MLB	NL		6th	65	88	.425	26½		
1934	MLB	NL		6th	71	81	.467	23½		
1935	MLB	NL		5th	70	83	.458	29½		
1936	MLB	NL		7th	67	87	.435	25		
1937	MLB	NL		6th	62	91	.405	33½		
1938	MLB	NL		7th	69	80	.463	18½		
1939	MLB	NL		3rd	84	69	.549	12½		
1940	MLB	NL		2nd	88	65	.575	12		
1941	MLB	NL *		1st	100	54	.649	—	Lost World Series (Yankees) 4–1 *	Dolph Camilli (MVP)
1942	MLB	NL		2nd	104	50	.675	2		
1943	MLB	NL		3rd	81	72	.529	23½		
1944	MLB	NL		7th	63	91	.409	42		
1945	MLB	NL		3rd	87	67	.565	11		
1946	MLB	NL		2nd	96	60	.615	2		
1947	MLB	NL *		1st	94	60	.610	—	Lost World Series (Yankees) 4–3 *	Jackie Robinson (ROY)
1948	MLB	NL		3rd	84	70	.545	7½		
1949	MLB	NL *		1st	97	57	.630	—	Lost World Series (Yankees) 4–1 *	Jackie Robinson (MVP); Don Newcombe (ROY)
1950	MLB	NL		2nd	89	65	.578	2		
1951	MLB	NL		2nd	97	60	.618	1		Roy Campanella (MVP)
1952	MLB	NL *		1st	96	57	.627	—	Lost World Series (Yankees) 4–3 *	Joe Black (ROY)
1953	MLB	NL *		1st	105	49	.682	—	Lost World Series (Yankees) 4–2 *	Roy Campanella (MVP); Jim Gilliam (ROY)
1954	MLB	NL		2nd	92	62	.597	5		
1955	MLB ‡	NL *		1st	98	55	.641	—	Won World Series (Yankees) 4–3 ‡	Roy Campanella (MVP); Johnny Podres (WS MVP)
1956	MLB	NL *		1st	93	61	.604	—	Lost World Series (Yankees) 4–3 *	Don Newcombe (MVP, CYA)
1957	MLB	NL		3rd	84	70	.545	11		
Los Angeles Dodgers
1958	MLB	NL		7th	71	83	.461	21		
1959	MLB ‡	NL *		1st	88	68	.564	—	Won World Series (White Sox) 4–2 ‡	Larry Sherry (WS MVP)
1960	MLB	NL		4th	82	72	.532	13		Frank Howard (ROY)
1961	MLB	NL		2nd	89	65	.578	4		
1962	MLB	NL		2nd	102	63	.618	1		Maury Wills (MVP); Don Drysdale (CYA)
1963	MLB ‡	NL *		1st	99	63	.611	—	Won World Series (Yankees) 4–0 ‡	Sandy Koufax (MVP, CYA, TC, WS MVP)
1964	MLB	NL		7th	80	82	.494	13		
1965	MLB ‡	NL *		1st	97	65	.599	—	Won World Series (Twins) 4–3 ‡	Sandy Koufax (CYA, TC, WS MVP); Jim Lefebvre (ROY)
1966	MLB	NL *		1st	95	67	.586	—	Lost World Series (Orioles) 4–0 *	Sandy Koufax (CYA, TC)
1967	MLB	NL		8th	73	89	.451	28½		
1968	MLB	NL		8th	76	86	.469	21		
1969	MLB	NL	West	4th	85	77	.525	8		Ted Sizemore (ROY)
1970	MLB	NL	West	2nd	87	74	.540	14½		
1971	MLB	NL	West	2nd	89	73	.549	1		
1972	MLB	NL	West	3rd	85	70	.548	10½		
1973	MLB	NL	West	2nd	95	66	.590	3½		
1974	MLB	NL *	West ^	1st	102	60	.630	—	Won NLCS (Pirates) 3–1; Lost World Series (Athletics) 4–1 *	Steve Garvey (MVP); Mike Marshall (CYA)
1975	MLB	NL	West	2nd	88	74	.543	20		
1976	MLB	NL	West	2nd	92	70	.568	10		
1977	MLB	NL *	West ^	1st	98	64	.605	—	Won NLCS (Phillies) 3–1; Lost World Series (Yankees) 4–2 *	
1978	MLB	NL *	West ^	1st	95	67	.586	—	Won NLCS (Phillies) 3–1; Lost World Series (Yankees) 4–2 *	
1979	MLB	NL	West	3rd	79	83	.488	11½		Rick Sutcliffe (ROY)
1980	MLB	NL	West	2nd	92	71	.564	1		Steve Howe (ROY)
1981	MLB ‡	NL *	West ^	1st	36	21	.632	—	Won NLDS (Astros) 3–2; Won NLCS (Expos) 3–2; Won World Series (Yankees) 4–2 ‡	Fernando Valenzuela (CYA, ROY); Ron Cey (co-WS MVP); Pedro Guerrero (co-WS MVP); Steve Yeager (co-WS MVP)
1981	MLB ‡	NL *	West ^	4th	27	26	.509	6	Won NLDS (Astros) 3–2; Won NLCS (Expos) 3–2; Won World Series (Yankees) 4–2 ‡	Fernando Valenzuela (CYA, ROY); Ron Cey (co-WS MVP); Pedro Guerrero (co-WS MVP); Steve Yeager (co-WS MVP)
1982	MLB	NL	West	2nd	88	74	.543	1		Steve Sax (ROY)
1983	MLB	NL	West ^	1st	91	71	.562	—	Lost NLCS (Phillies) 3–1	Tommy Lasorda (MOY)
1984	MLB	NL	West	4th	79	83	.488	13		
1985	MLB	NL	West ^	1st	95	67	.586	—	Lost NLCS (Cardinals) 4–2	
1986	MLB	NL	West	5th	73	89	.451	23		
1987	MLB	NL	West	4th	73	89	.451	17		
1988	MLB ‡	NL *	West ^	1st	94	67	.584	—	Won NLCS (Mets) 4–3; Won World Series (Athletics) 4–1 ‡	Kirk Gibson (MVP); Orel Hershiser (CYA, WS MVP); Tommy Lasorda (MOY)
1989	MLB	NL	West	4th	77	83	.481	14		
1990	MLB	NL	West	2nd	86	76	.531	5		
1991	MLB	NL	West	2nd	93	69	.574	1		
1992	MLB	NL	West	6th	63	99	.389	35		Eric Karros (ROY)
1993	MLB	NL	West	4th	81	81	.500	23		Mike Piazza (ROY)
1994	MLB	NL	West	1st	58	56	.509	—	Playoffs cancelled	Raúl Mondesí (ROY)
1995	MLB	NL	West ^	1st	78	66	.542	—	Lost NLDS (Reds) 3–0	Hideo Nomo (ROY)
1996	MLB	NL	West	2nd ¤	90	72	.556	1	Lost NLDS (Braves) 3–0	Todd Hollandsworth (ROY)
1997	MLB	NL	West	2nd	88	74	.543	2		
1998	MLB	NL	West	3rd	83	79	.512	15		
1999	MLB	NL	West	3rd	77	85	.475	23		
2000	MLB	NL	West	2nd	86	76	.531	11		
2001	MLB	NL	West	3rd	86	76	.531	6		
2002	MLB	NL	West	3rd	92	70	.568	6		
2003	MLB	NL	West	2nd	85	77	.525	15½		Éric Gagné (CYA)
2004	MLB	NL	West ^	1st	93	69	.574	—	Lost NLDS (Cardinals) 3–1	
2005	MLB	NL	West	4th	71	91	.438	11		
2006	MLB	NL	West	2nd ¤	88	74	.543	—	Lost NLDS (Mets) 3–0	
2007	MLB	NL	West	4th	82	80	.506	8		
2008	MLB	NL	West ^	1st	84	78	.519	—	Won NLDS (Cubs) 3–0; Lost NLCS (Phillies) 4–1	
2009	MLB	NL	West ^	1st	95	67	.586	—	Won NLDS (Cardinals) 3–0; Lost NLCS (Phillies) 4–1	
2010	MLB	NL	West	4th	80	82	.494	12		
2011	MLB	NL	West	3rd	82	79	.509	11½		Clayton Kershaw (CYA, TC)
2012	MLB	NL	West	2nd	86	76	.531	8		
2013	MLB	NL	West ^	1st	92	70	.568	—	Won NLDS (Braves) 3–1; Lost NLCS (Cardinals) 4–2	Clayton Kershaw (CYA)
2014	MLB	NL	West ^	1st	94	68	.580	—	Lost NLDS (Cardinals) 3–1	Clayton Kershaw (MVP, CYA)
2015	MLB	NL	West ^	1st	92	70	.568	—	Lost NLDS (Mets) 3–2	
2016	MLB	NL	West ^	1st	91	71	.562	—	Won NLDS (Nationals) 3–2; Lost NLCS (Cubs) 4–2	Corey Seager (ROY); Dave Roberts (MOY)
2017	MLB	NL *	West ^	1st	104	58	.642	—	Won NLDS (Diamondbacks) 3–0; Won NLCS (Cubs) 4–1; Lost World Series (Astros) 4–3 *	Cody Bellinger (ROY)
2018	MLB	NL *	West ^	1st	92	71	.564	—	Won NLDS (Braves) 3–1; Won NLCS (Brewers) 4–3; Lost World Series (Red Sox) 4–1 *	
2019	MLB	NL	West ^	1st	106	56	.654	—	Lost NLDS (Nationals) 3–2	Cody Bellinger (MVP)
2020	MLB ‡	NL *	West ^	1st	43	17	.717	—	Won NLWC (Brewers) 2–0; Won NLDS (Padres) 3–0; Won NLCS (Braves) 4–3; Won World Series (Rays) 4–2 ‡	Corey Seager (WS MVP)
2021	MLB	NL	West	2nd ¤	106	56	.654	1	Won NLWC (Cardinals); Won NLDS (Giants) 3–2; Lost NLCS (Braves) 4–2	
2022	MLB	NL	West ^	1st	111	51	.685	—	Lost NLDS (Padres) 3–1	
2023	MLB	NL	West ^	1st	100	62	.617	—	Lost NLDS (Diamondbacks) 3–0	
2024	MLB ‡	NL *	West ^	1st	98	64	.605	—	Won NLDS (Padres) 3–2; Won NLCS (Mets) 4–2; Won World Series (Yankees) 4–1 ‡	Shohei Ohtani (MVP); Freddie Freeman (WS MVP)
2025	MLB ‡	NL *	West ^	1st	93	69	.574	—	Won NLWC (Reds) 2–0; Won NLDS (Phillies) 3–1; Won NLCS (Brewers) 4–0; Won World Series (Blue Jays) 4–3 ‡	Shohei Ohtani (MVP); Yoshinobu Yamamoto (WS MVP)
2026	MLB	NL	West ^	1st	100	62	.617	—	Won NLDS (Braves) 3–1; Lost NLCS (Brewers) 4–0	

== All-time records ==
	Games	Wins	Losses	Win%
All-time regular season record	21,824	11,625	10,199	.533
All-time post-season record^{[b]}	317	156	161	.492
All-time regular and post-season record	22,141	11,781	10,360	.532

== Record by decade ==
The following table describes the Dodgers' MLB win–loss record by decade.

Decade	Wins	Losses	Pct
1880s	410	764	.349
1890s	722	644	.529
1900s	649	809	.445
1910s	696	787	.469
1920s	765	768	.499
1930s	734	793	.481
1940s	894	646	.581
1950s	913	630	.592
1960s	878	729	.546
1970s	910	701	.565
1980s	825	741	.527
1990s	797	757	.513
2000s	862	758	.532
2010s	919	701	.567
2020s	551	319	.633
All-time	11525	10137	.532

These statistics are from Baseball-Reference.com's Los Angeles Dodgers History & Encyclopedia, and are current as of November 1, 2025.

== Postseason record by year ==
The Dodgers have made the Major League Baseball postseason forty times in their history, the first being in 1916 and the most recent in 2026.

Postseason record by year
Year	Finish	Round	Opponent	Result		
1916	National League Champions	World Series	Boston Red Sox	Lost	1	4
1920	National League Champions	World Series	Cleveland Indians	Lost	2	5
1941	National League Champions	World Series	New York Yankees	Lost	1	4
1947	National League Champions	World Series	New York Yankees	Lost	3	4
1949	National League Champions	World Series	New York Yankees	Lost	1	4
1952	National League Champions	World Series	New York Yankees	Lost	3	4
1953	National League Champions	World Series	New York Yankees	Lost	2	4
1955	World Series Champions	World Series	New York Yankees	Won	4	3
1956	National League Champions	World Series	New York Yankees	Lost	3	4
1959	World Series Champions	World Series	Chicago White Sox	Won	4	2
1963	World Series Champions	World Series	New York Yankees	Won	4	0
1965	World Series Champions	World Series	Minnesota Twins	Won	4	3
1966	National League Champions	World Series	Baltimore Orioles	Lost	0	4
1974	National League Champions	NLCS	Pittsburgh Pirates	Won	3	1
1974	National League Champions	World Series	Oakland Athletics	Lost	1	4
1977	National League Champions	NLCS	Philadelphia Phillies	Won	3	1
1977	National League Champions	World Series	New York Yankees	Lost	2	4
1978	National League Champions	NLCS	Philadelphia Phillies	Won	3	1
1978	National League Champions	World Series	New York Yankees	Lost	2	4
1981	World Series Champions	NLDS	Houston Astros	Won	3	2
1981	World Series Champions	NLCS	Montreal Expos	Won	3	2
1981	World Series Champions	World Series	New York Yankees	Won	4	2
1983	National League West Champions	NLCS	Philadelphia Phillies	Lost	1	3
1985	National League West Champions	NLCS	St Louis Cardinals	Lost	2	4
1988	World Series Champions	NLCS	New York Mets	Won	4	3
1988	World Series Champions	World Series	Oakland Athletics	Won	4	1
1995	National League West Champions	NLDS	Cincinnati Reds	Lost	0	3
1996	National League Wild Card	NLDS	Atlanta Braves	Lost	0	3
2004	National League West Champions	NLDS	St Louis Cardinals	Lost	1	3
2006	National League Wild Card	NLDS	New York Mets	Lost	0	3
2008	National League West Champions	NLDS	Chicago Cubs	Won	3	0
2008	National League West Champions	NLCS	Philadelphia Phillies	Lost	1	4
2009	National League West Champions	NLDS	St Louis Cardinals	Won	3	0
2009	National League West Champions	NLCS	Philadelphia Phillies	Lost	1	4
2013	National League West Champions	NLDS	Atlanta Braves	Won	3	1
2013	National League West Champions	NLCS	St Louis Cardinals	Lost	2	4
2014	National League West Champions	NLDS	St Louis Cardinals	Lost	1	3
2015	National League West Champions	NLDS	New York Mets	Lost	2	3
2016	National League West Champions	NLDS	Washington Nationals	Won	3	2
2016	National League West Champions	NLCS	Chicago Cubs	Lost	2	4
2017	National League Champions	NLDS	Arizona Diamondbacks	Won	3	0
2017	National League Champions	NLCS	Chicago Cubs	Won	4	1
2017	National League Champions	World Series	Houston Astros	Lost	3	4
2018	National League Champions	NLDS	Atlanta Braves	Won	3	1
2018	National League Champions	NLCS	Milwaukee Brewers	Won	4	3
2018	National League Champions	World Series	Boston Red Sox	Lost	1	4
2019	National League West Champions	NLDS	Washington Nationals	Lost	2	3
2020	World Series Champions	NLWC	Milwaukee Brewers	Won	2	0
2020	World Series Champions	NLDS	San Diego Padres	Won	3	0
2020	World Series Champions	NLCS	Atlanta Braves	Won	4	3
2020	World Series Champions	World Series	Tampa Bay Rays	Won	4	2
2021	National League Wild Card	NLWC	St Louis Cardinals	Won	1	0
2021	National League Wild Card	NLDS	San Francisco Giants	Won	3	2
2021	National League Wild Card	NLCS	Atlanta Braves	Lost	2	4
2022	National League West Champions	NLDS	San Diego Padres	Lost	1	3
2023	National League West Champions	NLDS	Arizona Diamondbacks	Lost	0	3
2024	World Series Champions	NLDS	San Diego Padres	Won	3	2
2024	World Series Champions	NLCS	New York Mets	Won	4	2
2024	World Series Champions	World Series	New York Yankees	Won	4	1
2025	World Series Champions	NLWC	Cincinnati Reds	Won	2	0
2025	World Series Champions	NLDS	Philadelphia Phillies	Won	3	1
2025	World Series Champions	NLCS	Milwaukee Brewers	Won	4	0
2025	World Series Champions	World Series	Toronto Blue Jays	Won	4	3
2026	National League West Champions	NLDS	Atlanta Braves	Won	3	1
2026	National League West Champions	NLCS	Milwaukee Brewers	Lost	0	4
40	Totals			34-31	156	161

== Opening Day starting lineups ==
This is a chart of the Opening Day Starting Lineup for the Los Angeles Dodgers.

Opening day starting lineups

Year	Catcher	First baseman	Second baseman	Shortstop	Third baseman	Right fielder	Center fielder	Left fielder	Starting pitcher	Designated hitter
2026	Will Smith (5)	Freddie Freeman (4)	Miguel Rojas	Mookie Betts (2)	Max Muncy (5)	Kyle Tucker	Andy Pages (2)	Teoscar Hernández (2)	Yoshinobu Yamamoto (2)	Shohei Ohtani (3)
2025	Will Smith (4)	Enrique Hernández	Tommy Edman	Miguel Rojas (2)	Max Muncy (4)	Teoscar Hernández	Andy Pages	Michael Conforto	Yoshinobu Yamamoto	Shohei Ohtani (2)
2024	Will Smith (3)	Freddie Freeman (3)	Gavin Lux (3)	Mookie Betts	Max Muncy (3)	Jason Heyward	James Outman (2)	Teoscar Hernández	Tyler Glasnow	Shohei Ohtani
2023	Will Smith (2)	Freddie Freeman (2)	Miguel Vargas	Miguel Rojas	Max Muncy (2)	Mookie Betts (4)	James Outman	David Peralta	Julio Urías	J. D. Martinez
2022	Will Smith	Freddie Freeman	Gavin Lux (2)	Trea Turner	Max Muncy	Mookie Betts (3)	Cody Bellinger (3)	Chris Taylor (2)	Walker Buehler	Justin Turner
2021	Austin Barnes (3)	Max Muncy (3)	Gavin Lux	Corey Seager (6)	Justin Turner (5)	Mookie Betts (2)	Cody Bellinger (2)	Chris Taylor	Clayton Kershaw (9)	
2020	Austin Barnes (2)	Max Muncy (2)	Enrique Hernández (3)	Corey Seager (5)	Justin Turner (4)	Mookie Betts	Cody Bellinger	Joc Pederson (2)	Dustin May	A. J. Pollock
2019	Austin Barnes	Max Muncy	Enrique Hernández (2)	Corey Seager (4)	Justin Turner (3)	Cody Bellinger	A. J. Pollock	Joc Pederson	Hyun-jin Ryu	
2018	Yasmani Grandal (2)	Cody Bellinger	Enrique Hernández	Corey Seager (3)	Logan Forsythe	Yasiel Puig (5)	Chris Taylor	Matt Kemp	Clayton Kershaw (8)	
2017	Yasmani Grandal	Adrián González (5)	Logan Forsythe	Corey Seager (2)	Justin Turner (2)	Yasiel Puig (4)	Joc Pederson (3)	Andrew Toles	Clayton Kershaw (7)	
2016	A. J. Ellis (5)	Adrián González (4)	Chase Utley	Corey Seager	Justin Turner	Yasiel Puig (3)	Joc Pederson (2)	Carl Crawford (3)	Clayton Kershaw (6)	
2015	A. J. Ellis (4)	Adrián González (3)	Howie Kendrick	Jimmy Rollins	Juan Uribe (4)	Yasiel Puig (2)	Joc Pederson	Carl Crawford (2)	Clayton Kershaw (5)	
2014	A. J. Ellis (3)	Adrián González (2)	Justin Turner	Hanley Ramírez	Juan Uribe (3)	Yasiel Puig	Andre Ethier	Scott Van Slyke	Clayton Kershaw (4)	
2013	A. J. Ellis (2)	Adrián González	Mark Ellis	Justin Sellers	Luis Cruz	Andre Ethier (6)	Matt Kemp (5)	Carl Crawford	Clayton Kershaw (3)	
2012	A. J. Ellis	James Loney (5)	Mark Ellis	Dee Gordon	Juan Uribe (2)	Andre Ethier (5)	Matt Kemp (4)	Juan Rivera	Clayton Kershaw (2)	
2011	Rod Barajas	James Loney (4)	Jamey Carroll	Rafael Furcal (5)	Juan Uribe	Andre Ethier (4)	Matt Kemp (3)	Tony Gwynn Jr.	Clayton Kershaw	
2010	Russell Martin (4)	James Loney (3)	Blake DeWitt	Rafael Furcal (4)	Casey Blake (2)	Andre Ethier (3)	Matt Kemp (2)	Manny Ramirez (2)	Vicente Padilla	
2009	Russell Martin (3)	James Loney (2)	Orlando Hudson	Rafael Furcal (3)	Casey Blake	Andre Ethier (2)	Matt Kemp	Manny Ramirez	Hiroki Kuroda	
2008	Russell Martin (2)	James Loney	Jeff Kent (4)	Rafael Furcal (2)	Blake DeWitt	Matt Kemp	Andruw Jones	Andre Ethier	Brad Penny	
2007	Russell Martin	Nomar Garciaparra	Jeff Kent (3)	Ramón Martínez	Wilson Betemit	Andre Ethier	Juan Pierre	Luis Gonzalez	Derek Lowe (3)	
2006	Sandy Alomar Jr.	Olmedo Sáenz	Jeff Kent (2)	Rafael Furcal	Bill Mueller	J. D. Drew (2)	Jason Repko	José Cruz Jr.	Derek Lowe (2)	
2005	Jason Phillips	Hee-seop Choi	Jeff Kent	César Izturis (5)	José Valentín	J. D. Drew	Milton Bradley (2)	Ricky Ledée	Derek Lowe	
2004	Paul Lo Duca (3)	Shawn Green	Alex Cora	César Izturis (4)	Adrián Beltré (5)	Juan Encarnación	Milton Bradley	Dave Roberts	Hideo Nomo (2)	
2003	Paul Lo Duca (2)	Fred McGriff	Jolbert Cabrera	César Izturis (3)	Adrián Beltré (4)	Shawn Green (4)	Dave Roberts (2)	Brian Jordan (2)	Hideo Nomo	
2002	Paul Lo Duca	Eric Karros (9)	Mark Grudzielanek (3)	César Izturis (2)	Adrián Beltré (3)	Shawn Green (3)	Dave Roberts	Brian Jordan	Kevin Brown (3)	
2001	Chad Kreuter	Eric Karros (8)	Mark Grudzielanek (2)	César Izturis	Chris Donnels	Shawn Green (2)	Tom Goodwin	Gary Sheffield (3)	Chan Ho Park	
2000	Todd Hundley (2)	Eric Karros (7)	Mark Grudzielanek	Kevin Elster	Adrián Beltré (2)	Shawn Green	Devon White	Gary Sheffield (2)	Kevin Brown (2)	
1999	Todd Hundley	Eric Karros (6)	Eric Young (2)	Mark Grudzielanek	Adrián Beltré	Raúl Mondesí (5)	Devon White	Gary Sheffield	Kevin Brown	
1998	Mike Piazza (6)	Paul Konerko	Eric Young	José Vizcaíno	Todd Zeile (2)	Raúl Mondesí (4)	Trenidad Hubbard	Todd Hollandsworth (3)	Ramón Martínez (5)	
1997	Mike Piazza (5)	Eric Karros (5)	Wilton Guerrero	Greg Gagne (2)	Todd Zeile	Raúl Mondesí (3)	Brett Butler (6)	Todd Hollandsworth (2)	Ramón Martínez (4)	
1996	Mike Piazza (4)	Eric Karros (4)	Delino DeShields (3)	Greg Gagne	Mike Blowers	Raúl Mondesí (2)	Brett Butler (5)	Todd Hollandsworth	Ramón Martínez (3)	
1995	Mike Piazza (3)	Eric Karros (3)	Delino DeShields (2)	José Offerman (4)	Dave Hansen	Henry Rodríguez	Raúl Mondesí	Billy Ashley	Ramón Martínez (2)	
1994	Mike Piazza (2)	Eric Karros (2)	Delino DeShields	José Offerman (3)	Tim Wallach (2)	Raúl Mondesí	Brett Butler (4)	Henry Rodríguez	Orel Hershiser (4)	
1993	Mike Piazza	Eric Karros	Jody Reed	José Offerman (2)	Tim Wallach	Darryl Strawberry (3)	Brett Butler (3)	Eric Davis (2)	Orel Hershiser (3)	
1992	Mike Scioscia (10)	Kal Daniels	Juan Samuel (2)	José Offerman	Lenny Harris (2)	Darryl Strawberry (2)	Brett Butler (2)	Eric Davis	Ramón Martínez	
1991	Mike Scioscia (9)	Eddie Murray (3)	Juan Samuel	Alfredo Griffin (4)	Lenny Harris	Darryl Strawberry	Brett Butler	Kal Daniels (2)	Tim Belcher (2)	
1990	Mike Scioscia (8)	Eddie Murray (2)	Willie Randolph (2)	Alfredo Griffin (3)	Jeff Hamilton (2)	Hubie Brooks	Juan Samuel	Kal Daniels	Orel Hershiser (2)	
1989	Mike Scioscia (7)	Eddie Murray	Willie Randolph	Alfredo Griffin (2)	Jeff Hamilton	Mike Marshall (5)	John Shelby (2)	Kirk Gibson (2)	Tim Belcher	
1988	Mike Scioscia (6)	Mike Marshall	Steve Sax (6)	Alfredo Griffin	Pedro Guerrero (3)	Mike Davis	John Shelby	Kirk Gibson	Fernando Valenzuela (6)	
1987	Mike Scioscia (5)	Franklin Stubbs	Steve Sax (5)	Mariano Duncan (2)	Bill Madlock (2)	Mike Marshall (4)	Mike Ramsey	Ken Landreaux	Orel Hershiser	
1986	Mike Scioscia (4)	Greg Brock (2)	Steve Sax (4)	Mariano Duncan	Bill Madlock	Mike Marshall (3)	Ken Landreaux (6)	Franklin Stubbs	Fernando Valenzuela (5)	
1985	Mike Scioscia (3)	Sid Bream	Mariano Duncan	Dave Anderson	Pedro Guerrero (2)	Mike Marshall (2)	Ken Landreaux (5)	Al Oliver	Fernando Valenzuela (4)	
1984	Mike Scioscia (2)	Pedro Guerrero	Steve Sax (3)	Bill Russell (11)	Germán Rivera	Candy Maldonado	Ken Landreaux (4)	Mike Marshall	Fernando Valenzuela (3)	
1983	Steve Yeager (8)	Greg Brock	Steve Sax (2)	Bill Russell (10)	Pedro Guerrero	Mike Marshall	Ken Landreaux (3)	Dusty Baker (7)	Fernando Valenzuela (2)	
1982	Steve Yeager (7)	Steve Garvey (8)	Steve Sax	Bill Russell (9)	Ron Cey (9)	Pedro Guerrero (2)	Ken Landreaux (2)	Dusty Baker (6)	Jerry Reuss	
1981	Mike Scioscia	Steve Garvey (7)	Davey Lopes (7)	Bill Russell (8)	Ron Cey (8)	Pedro Guerrero	Ken Landreaux	Dusty Baker (5)	Fernando Valenzuela	
1980	Steve Yeager (6)	Steve Garvey (6)	Davey Lopes (6)	Derrel Thomas	Ron Cey (7)	Reggie Smith (4)	Rudy Law	Dusty Baker (4)	Burt Hooton (2)	
1979	Steve Yeager (5)	Steve Garvey (5)	Davey Lopes (5)	Bill Russell (7)	Ron Cey (6)	Reggie Smith (3)	Rick Monday (3)	Dusty Baker (3)	Burt Hooton	
1978	Steve Yeager (4)	Steve Garvey (4)	Davey Lopes (4)	Bill Russell (6)	Ron Cey (5)	Reggie Smith (2)	Rick Monday (2)	Dusty Baker (2)	Don Sutton (7)	
1977	Steve Yeager (3)	Steve Garvey (3)	Davey Lopes (3)	Bill Russell (5)	Ron Cey (4)	Reggie Smith	Rick Monday	Dusty Baker	Don Sutton (6)	
1976	Steve Yeager (2)	Steve Garvey (2)	Ted Sizemore (2)	Bill Russell (4)	Ron Cey (3)	Joe Ferguson (2)	Dusty Baker	Bill Buckner (3)	Don Sutton (5)	
1975	Steve Yeager	Steve Garvey	Davey Lopes (2)	Bill Russell (3)	Ron Cey (2)	Joe Ferguson	Jimmy Wynn (2)	Bill Buckner (2)	Don Sutton (4)	
1974	Joe Ferguson (2)	Bill Buckner (3)	Davey Lopes	Bill Russell (2)	Ron Cey	Willie Crawford (3)	Jimmy Wynn	Von Joshua	Don Sutton (3)	
1973	Joe Ferguson	Bill Buckner (2)	Lee Lacy	Bill Russell	Ken McMullen	Willie Crawford (2)	Willie Davis (11)	Manny Mota	Don Sutton (2)	
1972	Duke Sims (2)	Bill Buckner	Jim Lefebvre (2)	Maury Wills (10)	Billy Grabarkewitz	Frank Robinson	Willie Davis (10)	Willie Crawford	Don Sutton	
1971	Duke Sims	Wes Parker (5)	Bill Russell	Maury Wills (9)	Steve Garvey (2)	Bill Buckner	Willie Davis (9)	Dick Allen	Bill Singer	
1970	Tom Haller (3)	Wes Parker (4)	Ted Sizemore	Maury Wills (8)	Steve Garvey	Willie Crawford	Willie Davis (8)	Bill Buckner	Claude Osteen (3)	
1969	Tom Haller (2)	Ron Fairly (4)	Jim Lefebvre	Ted Sizemore	Bill Sudakis	Len Gabrielson	Willie Crawford	Andy Kosco	Don Drysdale (7)	
1968	Tom Haller	Wes Parker (3)	Paul Popovich	Zoilo Versalles	Bob Bailey	Ron Fairly (5)	Willie Davis (7)	Al Ferrara	Claude Osteen (2)	
1967	John Roseboro (9)	Ron Fairly (3)	Ron Hunt	Gene Michael	Jim Lefebvre (2)	Lou Johnson	Wes Parker	Bob Bailey	Bob Miller	
1966	John Roseboro (8)	Wes Parker (2)	Nate Oliver (2)	Maury Wills (7)	Jim Lefebvre	Ron Fairly (4)	Willie Davis (6)	Lou Johnson	Claude Osteen	
1965	John Roseboro (7)	Wes Parker	Jim Lefebvre	Maury Wills (6)	John Kennedy	Ron Fairly (3)	Willie Davis (5)	Tommy Davis (3)	Don Drysdale (6)	
1964	John Roseboro (6)	Ron Fairly (2)	Jim Gilliam (6)	Maury Wills (5)	Johnny Werhas	Frank Howard	Willie Davis (4)	Tommy Davis (2)	Sandy Koufax	
1963	John Roseboro (5)	Bill Skowron	Nate Oliver	Maury Wills (4)	Ken McMullen	Ron Fairly (2)	Willie Davis (3)	Tommy Davis	Don Drysdale (5)	
1962	John Roseboro (4)	Ron Fairly	Jim Gilliam (5)	Maury Wills (3)	Daryl Spencer	Duke Snider (3)	Willie Davis (2)	Wally Moon (4)	Johnny Podres	
1961	John Roseboro (3)	Norm Larker	Charlie Neal (5)	Maury Wills (2)	Tommy Davis	Duke Snider (2)	Willie Davis	Wally Moon (3)	Don Drysdale (4)	
1960	John Roseboro (2)	Gil Hodges (12)	Charlie Neal (4)	Maury Wills	Jim Gilliam	Duke Snider	Don Demeter	Wally Moon (2)	Don Drysdale (3)	
1959	John Roseboro	Gil Hodges (11)	Charlie Neal (3)	Don Zimmer (2)	Jim Baxes	Ron Fairly	Duke Snider (10)	Wally Moon	Don Drysdale (2)	
1958	Rube Walker	Gil Hodges (10)	Charlie Neal (2)	Pee Wee Reese (14)	Dick Gray	Carl Furillo (10)	Gino Cimoli	Duke Snider	Don Drysdale	
1957	Roy Campanella (9)	Gil Hodges (9)	Jim Gilliam (4)	Don Zimmer	Randy Jackson	Carl Furillo (9)	Duke Snider (9)	Gino Cimoli	Don Newcombe (3)	
1956	Roy Campanella (8)	Gil Hodges (8)	Charlie Neal	Pee Wee Reese (13)	Jackie Robinson (3)	Carl Furillo (8)	Duke Snider (8)	Jim Gilliam	Don Newcombe (2)	
1955	Roy Campanella (7)	Gil Hodges (7)	Jim Gilliam (3)	Pee Wee Reese (12)	Jackie Robinson (2)	Carl Furillo (7)	Duke Snider (7)	Sandy Amorós	Carl Erskine (4)	
1954	Roy Campanella (6)	Gil Hodges (6)	Jim Gilliam (2)	Pee Wee Reese (11)	Billy Cox (4)	Carl Furillo (6)	Duke Snider (6)	Jackie Robinson	Carl Erskine (3)	
1953	Roy Campanella (5)	Gil Hodges (5)	Jim Gilliam	Pee Wee Reese (10)	Jackie Robinson	Carl Furillo (5)	Duke Snider (5)	Don Thompson	Carl Erskine (2)	
1952	Roy Campanella (4)	Gil Hodges (4)	Jackie Robinson (5)	Pee Wee Reese (9)	Billy Cox (3)	Carl Furillo (4)	Duke Snider (4)	Andy Pafko	Preacher Roe	
1951	Roy Campanella (3)	Gil Hodges (3)	Jackie Robinson (4)	Pee Wee Reese (8)	Rocky Bridges	Carl Furillo (3)	Duke Snider (3)	Don Thompson	Carl Erskine	
1950	Roy Campanella (2)	Gil Hodges (2)	Jackie Robinson (3)	Pee Wee Reese (7)	Bobby Morgan	Carl Furillo (2)	Duke Snider (2)	George Shuba	Don Newcombe	
1949	Roy Campanella	Gil Hodges	Jackie Robinson (2)	Pee Wee Reese (6)	Billy Cox (2)	Carl Furillo	Duke Snider	Cal Abrams	Joe Hatten (2)	
1948	Gil Hodges	Preston Ward	Jackie Robinson	Pee Wee Reese (5)	Billy Cox	Dick Whitman	Carl Furillo (2)	Arky Vaughan	Rex Barney	
1947	Bruce Edwards	Jackie Robinson	Eddie Stanky	Pee Wee Reese (4)	Spider Jorgensen	Dixie Walker (5)	Pete Reiser	Gene Hermanski	Joe Hatten	
1946	Ferrell Anderson	Jack Graham	Billy Herman (2)	Pee Wee Reese (3)	Lew Riggs	Gene Hermanski	Carl Furillo	Dick Whitman	Hal Gregg (2)	
1945	Mickey Owen (5)	Augie Galan	Leo Durocher	Mike Sandlock	Bill Hart	Dixie Walker (4)	Luis Olmo	Frenchy Bordagaray	Curt Davis (2)	
1944	Mickey Owen (4)	Howie Schultz	Luis Olmo	Gene Mauch	Gil English	Dixie Walker (3)	Frenchy Bordagaray	Augie Galan	Hal Gregg	
1943	Mickey Owen (3)	Dolph Camilli (6)	Al Glossop	Arky Vaughan	Billy Herman	Dixie Walker (2)	Pete Reiser	Joe Medwick (3)	Ed Head	
1942	Mickey Owen (2)	Dolph Camilli (5)	Billy Herman	Pee Wee Reese (2)	Arky Vaughan	Dixie Walker	Augie Galan	Joe Medwick (2)	Curt Davis	
1941	Mickey Owen	Dolph Camilli (4)	Alex Kampouris	Pee Wee Reese	Cookie Lavagetto (4)	Paul Waner	Dixie Walker	Joe Medwick	Whit Wyatt (2)	
1940	Babe Phelps (3)	Dolph Camilli (3)	Pete Coscarart (2)	Leo Durocher (3)	Cookie Lavagetto (3)	Roy Cullenbine	Charlie Gilbert	Joe Vosmik	Whit Wyatt	
1939	Babe Phelps (2)	Dolph Camilli (2)	Pete Coscarart	Leo Durocher (2)	Cookie Lavagetto (2)	Gene Moore	Goody Rosen (2)	Fred Sington	Red Evans	
1938	Paul Chervinko	Dolph Camilli	Johnny Hudson	Leo Durocher	Cookie Lavagetto	Kiki Cuyler	Goody Rosen	Ernie Koy	Van Mungo (4)	
1937	Babe Phelps	Buddy Hassett (2)	Cookie Lavagetto	Woody English	Jim Bucher (2)	Heinie Manush	Eddie Wilson	Tom Winsett	Van Mungo (3)	
1936	Ray Berres	Buddy Hassett	Lonny Frey	Jimmy Jordan	Jim Bucher	Ox Eckhardt	Johnny Cooney	Freddie Lindstrom	George Earnshaw	
1935	Al López (5)	Sam Leslie (2)	Tony Cuccinello (4)	Lonny Frey	Joe Stripp (4)	Buzz Boyle	Len Koenecke	Danny Taylor	Van Mungo (2)	
1934	Al López (4)	Sam Leslie	Tony Cuccinello (3)	Jimmy Jordan	Joe Stripp (3)	Johnny Frederick (3)	Danny Taylor (2)	Hack Wilson	Van Mungo	
1933	Al López (3)	Joe Judge	Tony Cuccinello (2)	Jake Flowers	Joe Stripp (2)	Johnny Frederick (2)	Danny Taylor	Lefty O'Doul (2)	Watty Clark (3)	
1932	Al López (2)	High Pockets Kelly	Tony Cuccinello	Glenn Wright (3)	Joe Stripp	Johnny Frederick	Hack Wilson	Alta Cohen	Waite Hoyt	
1931	Al López	Del Bissonette (4)	Neal Finn	Glenn Wright (2)	Wally Gilbert (2)	Babe Herman (3)	Johnny Frederick (3)	Lefty O'Doul	Jack Quinn	
1930	Val Picinich	Del Bissonette (3)	Jake Flowers (2)	Glenn Wright	Wally Gilbert	Babe Herman (2)	Johnny Frederick (2)	Harvey Hendrick	Watty Clark (2)	
1929	Hank DeBerry (6)	Del Bissonette (2)	Jake Flowers	Dave Bancroft (2)	Harvey Hendrick	Babe Herman	Johnny Frederick	Nick Cullop	Watty Clark	
1928	Charlie Hargreaves	Del Bissonette	Harry Riconda	Dave Bancroft	Howard Freigau	Max Carey	Ty Tyson	Harvey Hendrick	Jesse Petty (3)	
1927	Butch Henline	Babe Herman	Jay Partridge	Johnny Butler	Bob Barrett	Harvey Hendrick	Max Carey	Jigger Statz	Jesse Petty (2)	
1926	Hank DeBerry (5)	Jack Fournier (3)	Milt Stock	Rabbit Maranville	William Marriott	Dick Cox	Gus Felix	Zack Wheat (16)	Jesse Petty	
1925	Hank DeBerry (4)	Jack Fournier (2)	Andy High	Johnny Mitchell	Milt Stock	Jimmy Johnston	Eddie Brown	Zack Wheat (15)	Dazzy Vance	
1924	Hank DeBerry (3)	Jack Fournier	Joe Klugmann	Binky Jones	Jimmy Johnston (4)	Tommy Griffith (2)	Bernie Neis	Zack Wheat (14)	Dutch Ruether (3)	
1923	Hank DeBerry (2)	Dutch Schliebner	Ivy Olson (3)	Jimmy Johnston	Andy High	Tommy Griffith	Turner Barber	Zack Wheat (13)	Dutch Ruether (2)	
1922	Hank DeBerry	Ray Schmandt	Ivy Olson (2)	Andy High	Jimmy Johnston (3)	Bernie Neis	Hy Myers (8)	Zack Wheat (12)	Dutch Ruether	
1921	Ernie Krueger (3)	Ed Konetchy (2)	Pete Kilduff	Ivy Olson (2)	Jimmy Johnston (2)	Tommy Griffith	Hy Myers (7)	Zack Wheat (11)	Leon Cadore (3)	
1920	Ernie Krueger (2)	Ed Konetchy	Ivy Olson	Chuck Ward	Jimmy Johnston	Bernie Neis	Hy Myers (6)	Zack Wheat (10)	Leon Cadore (2)	
1919	Ernie Krueger	Jimmy Johnston	Lew Malone	Ivy Olson (2)	Ollie O'Mara (2)	Tommy Griffith	Hy Myers (5)	Zack Wheat (9)	Leon Cadore	
1918	Otto Miller (4)	Jake Daubert (8)	Ray Schmandt	Ivy Olson	Ollie O'Mara	Jim Hickman	Hy Myers (4)	Jimmy Johnston	Rube Marquard	
1917	Chief Meyers	Jake Daubert (7)	George Cutshaw (5)	Bunny Fabrique	Ivy Olson	Casey Stengel (5)	Hy Myers (3)	Zack Wheat (8)	Wheezer Dell	
1916	Otto Miller (3)	Jake Daubert (6)	George Cutshaw (4)	Ollie O'Mara (2)	Gus Getz	Casey Stengel (4)	Hy Myers (2)	Zack Wheat (7)	Larry Cheney	
1915	Lew McCarty	John Hummel	George Cutshaw (3)	Ollie O'Mara	Joe Schultz	Casey Stengel (3)	Hy Myers	Zack Wheat (6)	Jeff Pfeffer	
1914	Otto Miller (2)	Jake Daubert (5)	George Cutshaw (2)	Dick Egan	Red Smith (3)	Casey Stengel (2)	Jack Dalton	Zack Wheat (5)	Ed Reulbach	
1913	Otto Miller	Jake Daubert (4)	George Cutshaw	Bob Fisher	Red Smith (2)	Benny Meyer	Casey Stengel	Zack Wheat (4)	Nap Rucker (4)	
1912	Ed Phelps	Jake Daubert (3)	John Hummel (3)	Dolly Stark	Red Smith	Herbie Moran	Hub Northen	Zack Wheat (3)	Nap Rucker (3)	
1911	Bill Bergen (4)	Jake Daubert (2)	John Hummel (2)	Bert Tooley	Eddie Zimmerman	Bob Coulson	Bill Davidson	Zack Wheat (2)	Cy Barger	
1910	Bill Bergen (3)	Jake Daubert	John Hummel	Tommy McMillan	Ed Lennox (2)	Harry Lumley (7)	Al Burch	Zack Wheat	Nap Rucker (2)	
1909	Bill Bergen (2)	Tim Jordan (3)	Whitey Alperman (2)	John Hummel	Ed Lennox	Harry Lumley (6)	Jimmy Sebring	Al Burch	Kaiser Wilhelm	
1908	Lew Ritter (2)	Tim Jordan (2)	Harry Pattee	Phil Lewis (4)	Whitey Alperman	Harry Lumley (5)	Billy Maloney (3)	John Hummel	Nap Rucker	
1907	John Butler	Tim Jordan	Whitey Alperman	Phil Lewis (3)	Doc Casey (2)	Harry Lumley (4)	Billy Maloney (2)	Emil Batch	Elmer Stricklett	
1906	Bill Bergen	Doc Gessler	John Hummel	Phil Lewis (2)	Doc Casey	Harry Lumley (3)	Billy Maloney	Jack McCarthy	Harry McIntire	
1905	Lew Ritter	Ed MacGamwell	Red Owens	Phil Lewis	Emil Batch	Harry Lumley (2)	John Dobbs (2)	Jimmy Sheckard (3)	Oscar Jones (2)	
1904	Fred Jacklitsch	Jack Doyle (2)	Sammy Strang	Charlie Babb	Mike McCormack	Harry Lumley	John Dobbs	Jimmy Sheckard (2)	Oscar Jones	
1903	Hughie Hearne	Jack Doyle	Tim Flood (2)	Bill Dahlen (3)	Sammy Strang	Judge McCredie	Ed Householder	Jimmy Sheckard	Henry Schmidt	
1902	Duke Farrell	Tom McCreery	Tim Flood	Bill Dahlen (2)	Charlie Irwin	Willie Keeler (2)	Cozy Dolan	George Hildebrand	Bill Donovan (2)	
1901	Deacon McGuire	Joe Kelley	Tom Daly	Bill Dahlen	Jimmy Sheckard	Willie Keeler	Tom McCreery	Lefty Davis	Bill Donovan	
