= 1907 Brooklyn Superbas season =

1907 Brooklyn Superbas
- League: National League
- Ballpark: Washington Park
- City: Brooklyn, New York
- Record: 65–83 (.439)
- League place: 5th
- Owners: Charles Ebbets, Henry Medicus
- President: Charles Ebbets
- Managers: Patsy Donovan

The 1907 Brooklyn Superbas finished in fifth place, with another losing season.

== Regular season ==
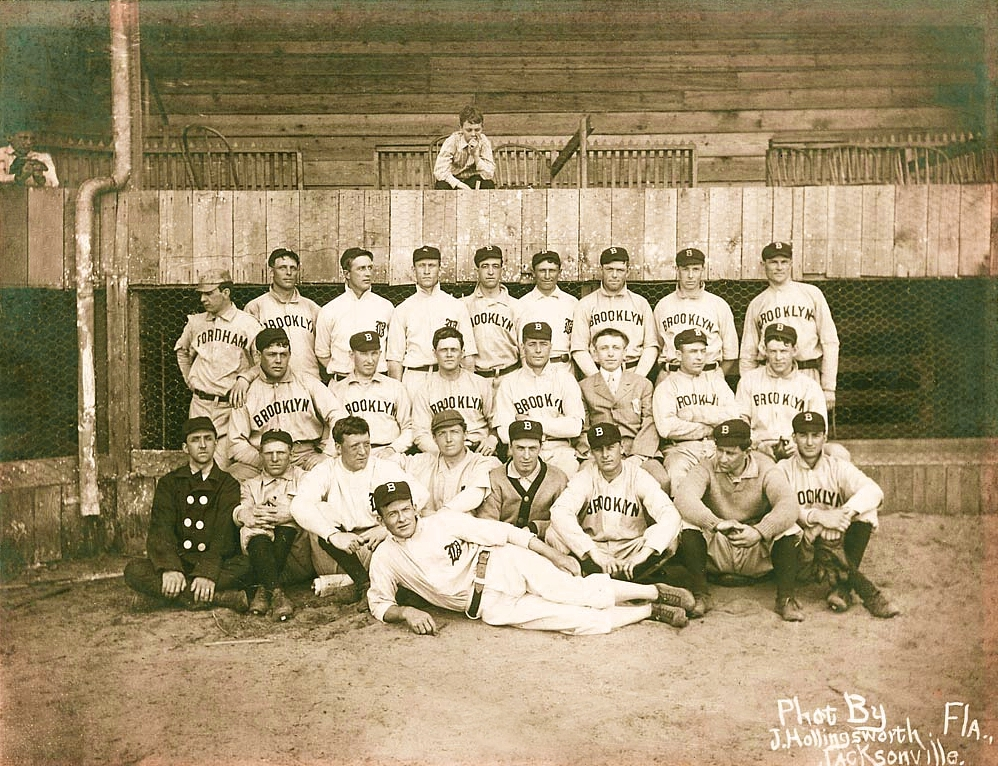

=== Season standings ===
National League
Team	W	L	Pct.	GB	Home	Road
Chicago Cubs	107	45	.704	—	54‍–‍19	53‍–‍26
Pittsburgh Pirates	91	63	.591	17	47‍–‍29	44‍–‍34
Philadelphia Phillies	83	64	.565	21½	45‍–‍30	38‍–‍34
New York Giants	82	71	.536	25½	45‍–‍30	37‍–‍41
Brooklyn Superbas	65	83	.439	40	37‍–‍38	28‍–‍45
Cincinnati Reds	66	87	.431	41½	43‍–‍36	23‍–‍51
Boston Doves	58	90	.392	47	31‍–‍42	27‍–‍48
St. Louis Cardinals	52	101	.340	55½	31‍–‍47	21‍–‍54

=== Record vs. opponents ===
1907 National League record Sources:
Team	BSN	BRO	CHC	CIN	NYG	PHI	PIT	STL
Boston	—	12–7–2	5–17	9–13	9–13	8–11–1	9–13–1	6–16
Brooklyn	7–12–2	—	5–15–1	15–7–1	10–12–1	8–13	6–16	14–8
Chicago	17–5	15–5–1	—	17–5	16–6	14–8	12–10–1	16–6–1
Cincinnati	13–9	7–15–1	5–17	—	9–13–1	8–13	10–12–1	14–8
New York	13–9	12–10–1	6–16	13–9–1	—	11–10	10–12	17–5
Philadelphia	11–8–1	13–8	8–14	13–8	10–11	—	14–8	14–7–1
Pittsburgh	13–9–1	16–6	10–12–1	12–10–1	12–10	8–14	—	20–2
St. Louis	16–6	8–14	6–16–1	8–14	5–17	7–14–1	2–20	—

=== Notable transactions ===
- July 5, 1907: Al Burch was purchased by the Superbas from the St. Louis Cardinals.

=== Roster ===
1907 Brooklyn Superbas
Roster
Pitchers: George Bell; Weldon Henley; Harry McIntire; Jim Pastorius; Nap Rucker; Doc Scanlan; Elmer Stricklett; Jesse Whiting	Catchers: Bill Bergen; John Butler; Jerry Hurley; Lew Ritter; Infielders: Whitey Alperman; Doc Casey; John Hummel; Phil Lewis; Tim Jordan	Outfielders: Emil Batch; Al Burch; Patsy Donovan; Harry Lumley; Billy Maloney; Jack McCarthy; Ed McLane	Manager: Patsy Donovan

== Player stats ==
=== Batting ===
==== Starters by position ====
Note: Pos = Position; G = Games played; AB = At bats; H = Hits; Avg. = Batting average; HR = Home runs; RBI = Runs batted in

Pos	Player	G	AB	H	Avg.	HR	RBI
C	Lew Ritter	93	271	55	.203	0	17
1B	Tim Jordan	147	485	133	.274	4	53
2B	Whitey Alperman	141	558	130	.233	2	39
3B	Doc Casey	141	527	122	.231	0	19
SS	Phil Lewis	136	475	118	.248	0	30
OF	Billy Maloney	144	502	115	.229	0	32
OF	Harry Lumley	127	454	121	.267	9	66
OF	Emil Batch	116	388	96	.247	0	31

==== Other batters ====
Note: G = Games played; AB = At bats; H = Hits; Avg. = Batting average; HR = Home runs; RBI = Runs batted in

Player	G	AB	H	Avg.	HR	RBI
John Hummel	107	342	80	.234	3	31
Bill Bergen	51	138	22	.159	0	14
Al Burch	40	120	35	.292	0	12
Jack McCarthy	25	91	20	.220	0	8
John Butler	30	79	10	.127	0	2
Jerry Hurley	1	2	0	.000	0	0
Ed McLane	1	2	0	.000	0	0
Patsy Donovan	1	1	0	.000	0	0

=== Pitching ===
==== Starting pitchers ====
Note: G = Games pitched; IP = Innings pitched; W = Wins; L = Losses; ERA = Earned run average; SO = Strikeouts

Player	G	IP	W	L	ERA	SO
Nap Rucker	37	275.1	15	13	2.06	131
George Bell	35	263.2	8	16	2.25	88
Elmer Stricklett	29	229.2	12	14	2.27	69
Jim Pastorius	28	222.0	16	12	2.35	70
Harry McIntire	28	199.2	7	15	2.39	49
Doc Scanlan	17	107.0	6	8	3.20	59
Weldon Henley	7	56.0	1	5	3.05	11

==== Relief pitchers ====
Note: G = Games pitched; W = Wins; L = Losses; SV = Saves; ERA = Earned run average; SO = Strikeouts

Player	G	W	L	SV	ERA	SO
Jesse Whiting	1	0	0	0	12.00	2
