= 1906 Brooklyn Superbas season =

1906 Brooklyn Superbas
- League: National League
- Ballpark: Washington Park
- City: Brooklyn, New York
- Record: 66–86 (.434)
- League place: 5th
- Owners: Charles Ebbets, Ferdinand Abell, Ned Hanlon, Henry Medicus
- President: Charles Ebbets
- Managers: Patsy Donovan

The 1906 Brooklyn Superbas saw Patsy Donovan take over as the team's manager. However, another poor season led to a fifth-place finish.

== Offseason ==
- December 1905: Mike O'Neill was purchased by the Superbas from the St. Louis Cardinals.
- December 15, 1905: Jimmy Sheckard was traded by the Superbas to the Chicago Cubs for Billy Maloney, Jack McCarthy, Doc Casey, Buttons Briggs and cash.

== Regular season ==
=== Season standings ===
National League
| Team | W | L | Pct. | GB | Home | Road |
|---|---|---|---|---|---|---|
| Chicago Cubs | 116 | 36 | .763 | — | 56‍–‍21 | 60‍–‍15 |
| New York Giants | 96 | 56 | .632 | 20 | 51‍–‍24 | 45‍–‍32 |
| Pittsburgh Pirates | 93 | 60 | .608 | 23½ | 49‍–‍27 | 44‍–‍33 |
| Philadelphia Phillies | 71 | 82 | .464 | 45½ | 37‍–‍40 | 34‍–‍42 |
| Brooklyn Superbas | 66 | 86 | .434 | 50 | 31‍–‍44 | 35‍–‍42 |
| Cincinnati Reds | 64 | 87 | .424 | 51½ | 36‍–‍40 | 28‍–‍47 |
| St. Louis Cardinals | 52 | 98 | .347 | 63 | 28‍–‍48 | 24‍–‍50 |
| Boston Beaneaters | 49 | 102 | .325 | 66½ | 28‍–‍47 | 21‍–‍55 |

=== Record vs. opponents ===
1906 National League record Sources:
| Team | BSN | BRO | CHC | CIN | NYG | PHI | PIT | STL |
|---|---|---|---|---|---|---|---|---|
| Boston | — | 9–13 | 5–17 | 11–10–1 | 6–15 | 6–16 | 3–19 | 9–12 |
| Brooklyn | 13–9 | — | 6–16 | 8–14 | 9–13 | 8–13 | 9–13 | 13–8–1 |
| Chicago | 17–5 | 16–6 | — | 18–4 | 15–7–1 | 19–3–1 | 16–5 | 15–6–1 |
| Cincinnati | 10–11–1 | 14–8 | 4–18 | — | 5–16 | 11–11 | 8–14–1 | 12–9–2 |
| New York | 15–6 | 13–9 | 7–15–1 | 16–5 | — | 15–7 | 11–11 | 19–3 |
| Philadelphia | 16–6 | 13–8 | 3–19–1 | 11–11 | 7–15 | — | 8–14 | 13–9 |
| Pittsburgh | 19–3 | 13–9 | 5–16 | 14–8–1 | 11–11 | 14–8 | — | 17–5 |
| St. Louis | 12–9 | 8–13–1 | 6–15–1 | 9–12–2 | 3–19 | 9–13 | 5–17 | — |

=== Notable transactions ===
- April 28: Doc Gessler was traded by the Superbas to the Chicago Cubs for Hub Knolls.

=== Roster ===
1906 Brooklyn Superbas
Roster
| Pitchers: Jack Doscher; Mal Eason; Hub Knolls; Chappie McFarland; Harry McIntire; Jim Pastorius; Doc Scanlan; Elmer Stricklett; Jesse Whiting | Catchers: Bill Bergen; John Butler; Lew Ritter; Infielders: Whitey Alperman; Doc Casey; Doc Gessler; John Hummel; Tim Jordan; Phil Lewis | Outfielders: Emil Batch; Patsy Donovan; Harry Lumley; Billy Maloney; Jack McCarthy; Phil Reardon | Manager: Patsy Donovan |

== Player stats ==
=== Batting ===
==== Starters by position ====
Note: Pos = Position; G = Games played; AB = At bats; H = Hits; Avg. = Batting average; HR = Home runs; RBI = Runs batted in

| Pos | Player | G | AB | H | Avg. | HR | RBI |
|---|---|---|---|---|---|---|---|
| C | Bill Bergen | 103 | 353 | 56 | .159 | 0 | 19 |
| 1B | Tim Jordan | 129 | 450 | 118 | .262 | 12 | 78 |
| 2B | Whitey Alperman | 128 | 441 | 111 | .252 | 3 | 46 |
| 3B | Doc Casey | 149 | 571 | 133 | .233 | 0 | 34 |
| SS | Phil Lewis | 136 | 452 | 110 | .243 | 0 | 37 |
| OF | Jack McCarthy | 91 | 322 | 98 | .304 | 0 | 35 |
| OF | Harry Lumley | 133 | 484 | 157 | .324 | 9 | 61 |
| OF | Billy Maloney | 151 | 566 | 125 | .221 | 0 | 32 |

==== Other batters ====
Note: G = Games played; AB = At bats; H = Hits; Avg. = Batting average; HR = Home runs; RBI = Runs batted in

| Player | G | AB | H | Avg. | HR | RBI |
|---|---|---|---|---|---|---|
| John Hummel | 97 | 286 | 57 | .199 | 1 | 21 |
| Lew Ritter | 73 | 226 | 47 | .208 | 0 | 15 |
| Emil Batch | 59 | 203 | 52 | .256 | 0 | 11 |
| Doc Gessler | 9 | 33 | 8 | .242 | 0 | 4 |
| Patsy Donovan | 7 | 21 | 5 | .238 | 0 | 0 |
| Phil Reardon | 5 | 14 | 1 | .071 | 0 | 0 |
| John Butler | 1 | 0 | 0 | ---- | 0 | 0 |

=== Pitching ===
==== Starting pitchers ====
Note: G = Games pitched; IP = Innings pitched; W = Wins; L = Losses; ERA = Earned run average; SO = Strikeouts

| Player | G | IP | W | L | ERA | SO |
|---|---|---|---|---|---|---|
| Elmer Stricklett | 41 | 291.2 | 14 | 18 | 2.72 | 88 |
| Doc Scanlan | 38 | 288.0 | 18 | 13 | 3.19 | 120 |
| Harry McIntire | 39 | 276.0 | 13 | 21 | 2.97 | 121 |
| Mal Eason | 34 | 227.0 | 10 | 17 | 3.25 | 64 |
| Jim Pastorius | 29 | 211.2 | 10 | 14 | 3.61 | 58 |
| Chappie McFarland | 1 | 9.0 | 0 | 1 | 8.00 | 5 |

==== Other pitchers ====
Note: G = Games pitched; IP = Innings pitched; W = Wins; L = Losses; ERA = Earned run average; SO = Strikeouts

| Player | G | IP | W | L | ERA | SO |
|---|---|---|---|---|---|---|
| Jesse Whiting | 3 | 24.2 | 1 | 1 | 2.92 | 7 |
| Jack Doscher | 2 | 14.0 | 0 | 1 | 1.29 | 10 |

==== Relief pitchers ====
Note: G = Games pitched; W = Wins; L = Losses; SV = Saves; ERA = Earned run average; SO = Strikeouts

| Player | G | W | L | SV | ERA | SO |
|---|---|---|---|---|---|---|
| Hub Knolls | 2 | 0 | 0 | 0 | 4.05 | 3 |
