= 1908 Brooklyn Superbas season =

1908 Brooklyn Superbas
- League: National League
- Ballpark: Washington Park
- City: Brooklyn, New York
- Record: 53–101 (.344)
- League place: 7th
- Owners: Charles Ebbets, Henry Medicus
- President: Charles Ebbets
- Managers: Patsy Donovan

The 1908 Brooklyn Superbas suffered through another poor season, finishing in seventh place. After the season, manager Patsy Donovan was fired. The club set a Major League record for the fewest doubles by a team in a season, with only 110, which still stands. The Superbas hit only .213 as a team, second lowest in the modern era after the 1910 Chicago White Sox. No regulars hit .250, Tim Jordan led the team with a .247 batting average.

== Offseason ==
- December 17, 1907: Tommy Sheehan was purchased by the Superbas from the Pittsburgh Pirates.

== Regular season ==
=== Season standings ===
National League
Team	W	L	Pct.	GB	Home	Road
Chicago Cubs	99	55	.643	—	47‍–‍30	52‍–‍25
New York Giants	98	56	.636	1	52‍–‍25	46‍–‍31
Pittsburgh Pirates	98	56	.636	1	42‍–‍35	56‍–‍21
Philadelphia Phillies	83	71	.539	16	43‍–‍34	40‍–‍37
Cincinnati Reds	73	81	.474	26	40‍–‍37	33‍–‍44
Boston Doves	63	91	.409	36	35‍–‍42	28‍–‍49
Brooklyn Superbas	53	101	.344	46	27‍–‍50	26‍–‍51
St. Louis Cardinals	49	105	.318	50	28‍–‍49	21‍–‍56

=== Record vs. opponents ===
1908 National League record Sources:
Team	BSN	BRO	CHC	CIN	NYG	PHI	PIT	STL
Boston	—	12–10	6–16–2	8–14	6–16	10–12	7–15	14–8
Brooklyn	10–12	—	4–18	6–16	6–16	5–17	9–13	13–9
Chicago	16–6–2	18–4	—	16–6	11–11–1	9–13–1	10–12	19–3
Cincinnati	14–8	16–6	6–16	—	8–14–1	10–12	8–14	11–11
New York	16–6	16–6	11–11–1	14–8–1	—	16–6	11–11–1	14–8
Philadelphia	12–10	17–5	13–9–1	12–10	6–16	—	9–13	14–8
Pittsburgh	15–7	13–9	12–10	14–8	11–11–1	13–9	—	20–2
St. Louis	8–14	9–13	3–19	11–11	8–14	8–14	2–20	—

=== Roster ===
1908 Brooklyn Superbas
Roster
Pitchers: George Bell; Pembroke Finlayson; Jim Holmes; Abe Kruger; Harry McIntire; Jim Pastorius; Nap Rucker; Kaiser Wilhelm	Catchers: Bill Bergen; Joe Dunn; Alex Farmer; Lew Ritter; Infielders: Whitey Alperman; Tim Jordan; Phil Lewis; Tommy McMillan; Simmy Murch; Harry Pattee; Tommy Sheehan	Outfielders: Al Burch; Tom Catterson; John Hummel; Harry Lumley; Billy Maloney	Manager: Patsy Donovan

== Player stats ==
=== Batting ===
==== Starters by position ====
Note: Pos = Position; G = Games played; AB = At bats; H = Hits; Avg. = Batting average; HR = Home runs; RBI = Runs batted in

Pos	Player	G	AB	H	Avg.	HR	RBI
C	Bill Bergen	99	302	53	.175	0	15
1B	Tim Jordan	148	515	127	.247	12	60
2B	Harry Pattee	80	264	57	.216	0	9
3B	Tommy Sheehan	146	468	100	.214	0	29
SS	Phil Lewis	118	415	91	.219	1	30
OF	Al Burch	123	456	111	.243	2	18
OF	Harry Lumley	127	440	95	.216	4	39
OF	Billy Maloney	113	359	70	.195	3	17

==== Other batters ====
Note: G = Games played; AB = At bats; H = Hits; Avg. = Batting average; HR = Home runs; RBI = Runs batted in

Player	G	AB	H	Avg.	HR	RBI
John Hummel	154	594	143	.241	4	41
Whitey Alperman	70	213	42	.197	1	15
Tommy McMillan	43	147	35	.238	0	3
Lew Ritter	38	99	19	.192	0	2
Tom Catterson	19	68	13	.191	1	2
Joe Dunn	20	64	11	.172	0	5
Alex Farmer	12	30	5	.167	0	2
Simmy Murch	6	11	2	.182	0	0

=== Pitching ===
==== Starting pitchers ====
Note: G = Games pitched; IP = Innings pitched; W = Wins; L = Losses; ERA = Earned run average; SO = Strikeouts

Player	G	IP	W	L	ERA	SO
Nap Rucker	42	333.1	17	19	2.08	199
Kaiser Wilhelm	42	332.0	16	22	1.87	99
Harry McIntire	40	288.0	11	20	2.69	108
Jim Pastorius	28	213.2	4	20	2.44	54
George Bell	29	155.1	4	15	3.59	63

==== Other pitchers ====
Note: G = Games pitched; IP = Innings pitched; W = Wins; L = Losses; ERA = Earned run average; SO = Strikeouts

Player	G	IP	W	L	ERA	SO
Abe Kruger	2	6.1	0	1	4.26	2

==== Relief pitchers ====
Note: G = Games pitched; W = Wins; L = Losses; SV = Saves; ERA = Earned run average; SO = Strikeouts

Player	G	W	L	SV	ERA	SO
Jim Holmes	13	1	4	0	3.38	10
Pembroke Finlayson	1	0	0	0	135.00	0
