= 1909 Brooklyn Superbas season =

1909 Brooklyn Superbas
- League: National League
- Ballpark: Washington Park
- City: Brooklyn, New York
- Record: 55–98 (.359)
- League place: 6th
- Owners: Charles Ebbets, Henry Medicus
- President: Charles Ebbets
- Managers: Harry Lumley

The 1909 Brooklyn Superbas handed the manager's job over to outfielder Harry Lumley. However, the team finished in sixth place again and Lumley's playing stats took a tumble as he tried to do both jobs. He was replaced as manager after the season and traded as a player halfway through the next season.

== Offseason ==
- February 18, 1909: Doc Marshall was purchased by the Superbas from the Chicago Cubs

== Regular season ==
=== Season standings ===
National League
Team	W	L	Pct.	GB	Home	Road
Pittsburgh Pirates	110	42	.724	—	56‍–‍21	54‍–‍21
Chicago Cubs	104	49	.680	6½	47‍–‍29	57‍–‍20
New York Giants	92	61	.601	18½	44‍–‍33	48‍–‍28
Cincinnati Reds	77	76	.503	33½	39‍–‍38	38‍–‍38
Philadelphia Phillies	74	79	.484	36½	40‍–‍37	34‍–‍42
Brooklyn Superbas	55	98	.359	55½	34‍–‍45	21‍–‍53
St. Louis Cardinals	54	98	.355	56	26‍–‍48	28‍–‍50
Boston Doves	45	108	.294	65½	27‍–‍47	18‍–‍61

=== Record vs. opponents ===
1909 National League record Sources:
Team	BSN	BRO	CHC	CIN	NYG	PHI	PIT	STL
Boston	—	11–11	1–21	5–17	8–14–2	10–12	1–20	9–13
Brooklyn	11–11	—	5–16	5–17–1	7–15	11–11	4–18	12–10–1
Chicago	21–1	16–5	—	16–6	11–11–1	16–6	9–13	15–7–1
Cincinnati	17–5	17–5–1	6–16	—	9–13–1	9–12–1	7–15–1	12–10
New York	14–8–2	15–7	11–11–1	13–9–1	—	12–10	11–11–1	16–5
Philadelphia	12–10	11–11	6–16	12–9–1	10–12	—	7–15	16–6
Pittsburgh	20–1	18–4	13–9	15–7–1	11–11–1	15–7	—	18–3
St. Louis	13–9	10–12–1	7–15–1	10–12	5–16	6–16	3–18	—

=== Roster ===
1909 Brooklyn Superbas
Roster
Pitchers: George Bell; Eddie Dent; Pembroke Finlayson; Sam Fletcher; George Hunter; Elmer Knetzer; Harry McIntire; Jim Pastorius; Nap Rucker; Doc Scanlan; Kaiser Wilhelm	Catchers: Bill Bergen; Joe Dunn; Doc Marshall; Infielders: Whitey Alperman; John Hummel; Tim Jordan; Ed Lennox; Pryor McElveen; Tommy McMillan; Leo Meyer; Harry Redmond	Outfielders: Al Burch; Tom Catterson; Wally Clement; Red Downey; Jul Kustus; Harry Lumley; Hy Myers; Jimmy Sebring; Zack Wheat	Manager: Harry Lumley

== Player stats ==
=== Batting ===
==== Starters by position ====
Note: Pos = Position; G = Games played; AB = At bats; H = Hits; Avg. = Batting average; HR = Home runs; RBI = Runs batted in

Pos	Player	G	AB	H	Avg.	HR	RBI
C	Bill Bergen	112	346	48	.139	1	15
1B	Tim Jordan	103	330	90	.273	3	36
2B	Whitey Alperman	111	420	104	.248	1	41
3B	Ed Lennox	126	435	114	.262	2	44
SS	Tommy McMillan	108	373	79	.212	0	24
OF	Al Burch	152	601	163	.271	1	30
OF	Wally Clement	92	340	88	.259	0	17
OF	Harry Lumley	55	172	43	.250	0	14

==== Other batters ====
Note: G = Games played; AB = At bats; H = Hits; Avg. = Batting average; HR = Home runs; RBI = Runs batted in

Player	G	AB	H	Avg.	HR	RBI
John Hummel	146	542	152	.280	4	52
Pryor McElveen	81	258	51	.198	3	25
Jul Kustus	53	173	25	.145	1	11
Doc Marshall	50	149	30	.201	0	10
George Hunter	44	123	28	.228	0	8
Zack Wheat	26	102	31	.304	0	4
Jimmy Sebring	25	81	8	.099	0	5
Red Downey	19	78	20	.256	0	8
Joe Dunn	10	25	4	.160	0	2
Leo Meyer	7	23	3	.130	0	0
Hy Myers	6	22	5	.227	0	6
Harry Redmond	6	19	0	.000	0	1
Tom Catterson	9	18	4	.222	0	1

=== Pitching ===
==== Starting pitchers ====
Note: G = Games pitched; IP = Innings pitched; W = Wins; L = Losses; ERA = Earned run average; SO = Strikeouts

Player	G	IP	W	L	ERA	SO
Nap Rucker	38	309.1	13	19	2.24	201
George Bell	33	256.0	16	15	2.71	95
Harry McIntire	32	228.0	7	17	3.63	84
Kaiser Wilhelm	22	163.0	3	13	3.26	45
Doc Scanlan	19	141.1	8	7	2.93	72
George Hunter	16	113.1	4	10	2.46	43
Jim Pastorius	12	79.2	1	9	5.76	23
Eddie Dent	6	42.0	2	4	4.29	17
Elmer Knetzer	5	35.2	1	3	3.03	7
Sam Fletcher	1	9.0	0	1	8.00	5

==== Relief pitchers ====
Note: G = Games pitched; W = Wins; L = Losses; SV = Saves; ERA = Earned run average; SO = Strikeouts

Player	G	W	L	SV	ERA	SO
Pembroke Finlayson	1	0	0	0	5.14	2
