= Alex Farmer =

Alex Farmer may refer to:

- Alex Farmer (bishop) (born 1966), American Anglican bishop
- Alex Farmer (baseball) (1877–1920), American professional baseball player

== See also ==
- Alec Farmer
