= William Bergen =

William Bergen may refer to:

- William M. Bergen (1862–1934), American politician
- Bill Bergen (1878–1943), American baseball player
