= Red Downey =

American baseball player (1889–1949)

- Outfielder
- Born: February 6, 1889; Aurora, Indiana, U.S.
- Died: July 10, 1949 (aged 60); Detroit, Michigan, U.S.
- Batted: Left Threw: Left

MLB debut
- September 14, 1909, for the Brooklyn Superbas

Last MLB appearance
- October 7, 1909, for the Brooklyn Superbas

MLB statistics
- Batting average: .256
- Home runs: 0
- Runs batted in: 8
- Stats at Baseball Reference

Teams
- Brooklyn Superbas (1909)

Alexander Cummings Downey (February 6, 1889 – July 10, 1949) was an American outfielder in Major League Baseball who played for the Brooklyn Superbas in its 1909 season. He attended Georgetown University.
