= Patsy Donovan =

American baseball player and manager (1865–1953)

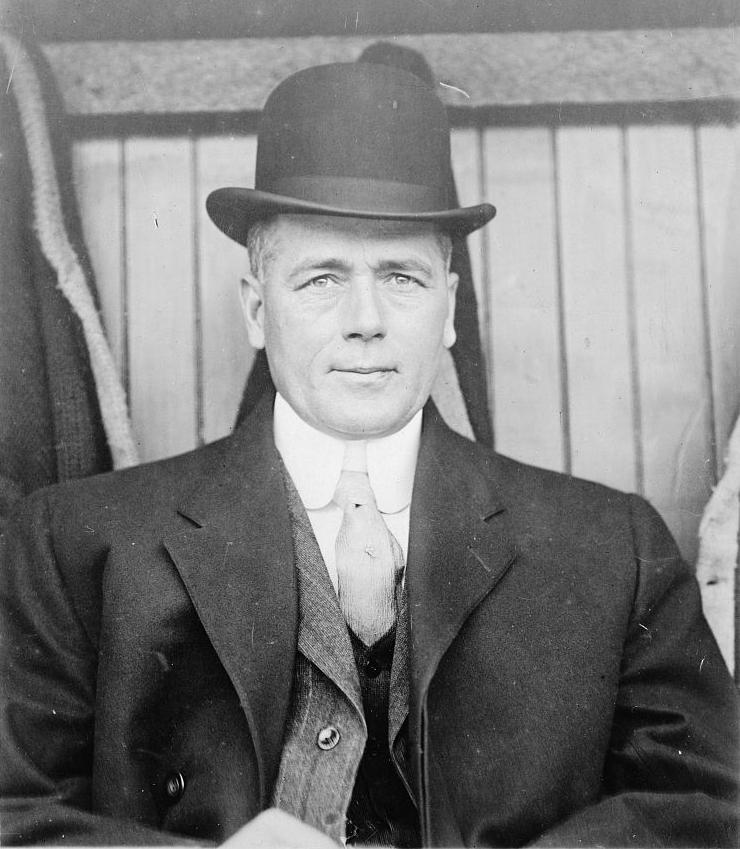
- Donovan in 1910
- Right fielder / Manager
- Born: March 16, 1865; Queenstown, Ireland
- Died: December 25, 1953 (aged 88); Lawrence, Massachusetts, U.S.
- Batted: Left Threw: Left

MLB debut
- April 19, 1890, for the Boston Beaneaters

Last MLB appearance
- October 5, 1907, for the Brooklyn Superbas

MLB statistics
- Batting average: .301
- Hits: 2,256
- Home runs: 16
- Runs batted in: 738
- Stolen bases: 518
- Managerial record: 684–879
- Stats at Baseball Reference

Teams
- As player: Boston Beaneaters (1890); Brooklyn Bridegrooms (1890); Louisville Colonels (1891); Washington Statesmen / Senators (1891–1892); Pittsburgh Pirates (1892–1899); St. Louis Cardinals (1900–1903); Washington Senators (1904); Brooklyn Superbas (1906–1907); As manager: Pittsburgh Pirates (1897, 1899); St. Louis Cardinals (1901–1903); Washington Senators (1904); Brooklyn Superbas (1906–1908); Boston Red Sox (1910–1911)

Career highlights and awards
- NL stolen base leader (1900)

Patrick Joseph "Patsy" Donovan (March 16, 1865 – December 25, 1953) was an American professional baseball right fielder and manager in Major League Baseball who played for several teams from 1890 to 1907, most notably the Pittsburgh Pirates. Donovan started his career with Boston in 1890 but shuffled over to Brooklyn before the season ended, which saw him win the National League pennant. He played for Louisville and Washington of the American Association for a season each before he found himself with the Pirates in 1892, where he would play for the next seven years. In his first full season with the team, he had his first .300 season as a National League player, batting .317 with 46 stolen bases and 158 hits in 113 games. He batted .300 in each of the next five seasons with Pittsburgh before his tenure ended in 1899. He joined St. Louis in 1900 and played the next four seasons for the team, which saw him bat .300 three straight times and lead the NL in stolen bases with 45 in 1900. He played a season in Washington before sitting out 1905; he played eight combined games in 1906 and 1907 with Brooklyn to end his career.

He batted .301 lifetime and set a major league record for career games in right field, as well as retiring among the career leaders in total games (5th, 1813), assists (9th, 264) and double plays (5th, 69) as an outfielder. Donovan batted and threw left-handed.

== Early years ==
Born in Queenstown, County Cork, Donovan established himself as the most successful Irish-born major leaguer. He broke into organized baseball in 1886 with the Lawrence, Massachusetts team in the New England League.

== Minor league career ==
In 1888 and 1889, Donovan played outfield for the London Tecumsehs of the International Association at Tecumseh Park (today's Labatt Park) in London, Ontario, Canada, where, in his first season in 1888, he led the league in batting with a .359 batting average (according to the Donovan family Web site; however, the London Tecumsehs' official scorer C. J. Moorehead, in a 1903 copy of The London Advertiser, cited Donovan's 1888 batting average as .398), had 201 hits, scored 103 runs and stole 80 bases. His second season with the Tecumsehs was less successful due to a leg injury.

== Major league career ==
In 1890 he made his major league debut in the National League (NL) with the Boston Beaneaters, and moved to the Brooklyn Bridegrooms in midseason; it would be the only time in his career he played for a league champion.

In 1891 he played in the American Association (AA) for the Louisville Colonels and Washington Statesmen; he then returned to the NL in 1892, first with the Senators (the former Statesmen, who had joined the NL in a league merger) before going to the Pirates for most of the year.

Donovan starred with the Pirates from 1893 through 1899, notching six consecutive seasons batting .300 and serving as player-manager in 1897 and 1899. The team was sold late in 1899, during a time when the league was contracting from twelve teams to eight; new owner Barney Dreyfuss brought in Fred Clarke to be manager, with Donovan being sent to the Cardinals. He played for St. Louis from 1900–1903, sharing the league lead in stolen bases (45) in his first season, also managing the team in his last three seasons with them.

By the end of the 1903 season he ranked among the NL's top ten career leaders in hits and at bats, though he would drop from among the leaders before his playing career ended. His 64 career double plays in the NL ranked one behind Jimmy Ryan's league record. He then served as player-manager for the American League's Washington Senators in 1904, his last season as a regular.

In 1903, he broke Sam Thompson's major league record of 1401 games in right field; however, Willie Keeler passed him in 1906, before Donovan played his last several games and retired with a total of 1620. In 1906, he became manager of the Brooklyn Superbas, and made his last few playing appearances that year, along with one more game at the end of the 1907 season.

In a 17-season playing career, Donovan had 2256 hits, 1321 runs, 16 home runs and 738 runs batted in in 1824 games, along with 208 doubles and 75 triples. Donovan was one of 32 players with 2,000 career hits when he retired. Donovan collected 518 total stolen bases: 302 stolen bases happened from 1890 to 1897, and 216 occurred after the statistic was revised to its modern definition in 1898.

== Post-playing career ==
Donovan joined the Boston Red Sox as a scout in 1909, and managed the team in 1910 and 1911. As a major league manager, he compiled a 684–879 record (.438) in 11 seasons. He was also instrumental in bringing Babe Ruth to the Sox in 1914 through his acquaintance with one of the Xaverian Brothers who coached Ruth at a Baltimore orphans' home. Later he went to the International League, where he led Buffalo to pennants in 1915 and 1916, and also managed Jersey City in 1921–22 and 1925–26.

In 1929 and 1930, Donovan managed the Orleans town team in the Cape Cod Baseball League. In 1930 one of his charges at Orleans was future New York Yankees legend Red Rolfe.

In a 1930 old-timers' game at Braves Field in Boston, Donovan had a pinch hit single, at the age of 65. He finished out his career coaching High School baseball at Phillips Academy in Andover, where he coached the future 41st President, George H. W. Bush. Donovan died at the age of 88 in Lawrence, Massachusetts, on Christmas Day 1953, and is interred at St. Mary Cemetery in Lawrence.

== Honors ==
In the Irish Baseball League, the annual award for best batter is named "The Patsy Donovan Batting Champion Award". In 2023, Donovan was inducted into the "Irish American Hall of Fame" in Chicago, some seventy years after his death.

== Managerial record ==
| Team | Year | Regular season | | | | | Postseason | | | |
| Team | Year | Games | Won | Lost | Win % | Finish | Won | Lost | Win % | Result |
|---|---|---|---|---|---|---|---|---|---|---|
| PIT | 1897 | 131 | 60 | 71 | .458 | 8th in NL | – | – | – | – |
| PIT | 1899 | 127 | 69 | 58 | .543 | 7th in NL | – | – | – | – |
| PIT total | | 258 | 129 | 129 | .500 | | 0 | 0 | – | |
| STL | 1901 | 140 | 76 | 64 | .543 | 4th in NL | – | – | – | – |
| STL | 1902 | 134 | 56 | 78 | .418 | 6th in NL | – | – | – | – |
| STL | 1903 | 137 | 43 | 94 | .314 | 8th in NL | – | – | – | – |
| STL total | | 411 | 175 | 236 | .426 | | 0 | 0 | – | |
| WSH | 1904 | 134 | 37 | 97 | .276 | 8th in AL | – | – | – | – |
| WSH total | | 134 | 37 | 97 | .276 | | 0 | 0 | – | |
| BKN | 1906 | 152 | 66 | 86 | .434 | 5th in NL | – | – | – | – |
| BKN | 1907 | 148 | 65 | 83 | .439 | 5th in NL | – | – | – | – |
| BKN | 1908 | 154 | 53 | 101 | .344 | 7th in NL | – | – | – | – |
| BKN total | | 454 | 184 | 270 | .405 | | 0 | 0 | – | |
| BOS | 1910 | 153 | 81 | 72 | .529 | 4th in AL | – | – | – | – |
| BOS | 1911 | 153 | 78 | 75 | .510 | 5th in AL | – | – | – | – |
| BOS total | | 306 | 159 | 147 | .520 | | 0 | 0 | – | |
| Total | | 1563 | 684 | 879 | .438 | | 0 | 0 | – | |

== See also ==
- List of Major League Baseball career hits leaders
- List of Major League Baseball career runs scored leaders
- List of Major League Baseball career stolen bases leaders
- List of Major League Baseball annual stolen base leaders
- List of Major League Baseball player-managers
- List of players from Ireland in Major League Baseball
