= Ed McLane =

American baseball player (1881-1975)

- Outfielder
- Born: August 20, 1881; Weston, Massachusetts, U.S.
- Died: August 21, 1975 (aged 94); Baltimore, Maryland, U.S.
- Batted: Right Threw: Unknown

MLB debut
- October 5, 1907, for the Brooklyn Superbas

Last MLB appearance
- October 5, 1907, for the Brooklyn Superbas

MLB statistics
- Batting average: .000
- Home runs: 0
- Runs batted in: 0
- Stats at Baseball Reference

Teams
- Brooklyn Superbas (1907)

Edward Cameron McLane (August 20, 1881 in Weston, Massachusetts – August 21, 1975 in Baltimore, Maryland), was an American professional baseball player who played outfield in one game for the 1907 Brooklyn Superbas. He attended Fordham University as well as the Maryland Agricultural College.

McLane starred for Fordham's baseball team as both a pitcher and outfielder, while also playing guard on the school's football team. He achieved a notable success on the diamond against Yale University on March 25, 1904. Stepping in at the last minute when Fordham's scheduled starting pitcher was incapacitated, he led his school to a 6–3 victory, the results of which were subsequently painted on the wall of the stadium. He received offers from several professional clubs during his college career, but elected to remain in school.

McLane's sole major league appearance was in the second game of a doubleheader and the last game of the season for fifth-place Brooklyn. The Superbas were playing the Boston Doves in Boston. Brooklyn lost the first game 6 to 5. In the second game, Brooklyn's pitcher, Doc Scanlan, faced Boston's rookie Sam Frock. According to The New York Times, "The second game rapidly degenerated into a farce, the Brooklyn players putting up a loose game in the field and at bat." Scanlon lasted only 1/3 inning, giving up 3 walks and 1 hit. George Bell replaced him and did not fare much better; over the first three innings, the Superbas gave up 11 runs without scoring any. With the score 11 to 0, the game was called "by agreement" after the top of the seventh inning.

Along with fellow major league player Jack Coffey, McLane was one of the top two candidates for the job as Fordham's baseball coach in 1910. The school announced on February 13 of that year, however, that they had selected Coffey over McLane, who at that time was an outfielder for Brockton of the New England League.
