= Jul Kustus =

American baseball player (1882–1916)

- Outfielder
- Born: September 5, 1882; Detroit, Michigan, U.S.
- Died: April 27, 1916 (aged 33); Eloise, Michigan, U.S.
- Batted: Right Threw: Right

MLB debut
- April 17, 1909, for the Brooklyn Superbas

Last MLB appearance
- July 10, 1909, for the Brooklyn Superbas

MLB statistics
- Batting average: .145
- Home runs: 1
- Runs batted in: 11
- Stats at Baseball Reference

Teams
- Brooklyn Superbas (1909)

Joseph Julius Kustus (September 5, 1882 – April 27, 1916) was an American professional baseball outfielder for the 1909 Brooklyn Superbas. Tuberculosis forced his early retirement from the game, and contributed to his death at the age of 33.

Kustus was the son of Anthony Kustus and Elizabeth Flemming Ponke. They were married September 16, 1877 in St. Albertus Church in Detroit. Jul was a baseball player who played outfield for various amateur teams in Detroit beginning around 1901. Some of the teams were Selling and May, Hillsides, the C.C. Wormer Machinery Co., and Bynum and Co. These teams would compete in tournaments for cash prizes. He played professional baseball for the 1909 Brooklyn Superbas who later became the Brooklyn Dodgers. He had a short career as a professional baseball player because he debuted April 17, 1909 and his last game was July 10, 1909. He came back to Detroit where he played amateur baseball again until 1914.

Joseph "Jul" died in the Eloise Sanitarium in Nankin Township, Michigan April 27, 1916 of pulmonary tuberculosis. He had been a patient there for only 16 days. Many patients in the end stages of tuberculosis were admitted to the sanitarium because it was the only option available to them. Joseph was admitted April 11, 1916 and was only 33 years 7 months and 22 days old when he died. His occupation is listed as a laborer in the Eloise death ledger book.

He never married but had a relationship with a woman named Rose Ann Zimmeth and they were business partners in a Detroit grocery. The grocery located at 1249 Mack Ave. was called the J.R. Grocery. He was survived by a brother August who also died of tuberculosis in 1917 and two sisters Mrs. Julia Sabatini and Mrs. C. French, and two half-sisters Annie Lukaszek and Elizabeth Kozlowski.

Some baseball web sites list his burial place as Detroit Memorial Park West in Redford, Michigan, but Jul is buried in Sacred Heart of St. Mary Cemetery (also known as Greenwood) in Detroit near his brother's grave. His grave marker was deteriorated and mostly unreadable when it was examined in the 1990s. Over the years a sycamore tree has grown around and right through his headstone damaging it into pieces, leaving only the base which is now embedded into the tree.
