= Harry Redmond (baseball) =

American baseball player (1887-1960)

- Second baseman
- Born: September 13, 1887; Cleveland, Ohio, U.S.
- Died: July 10, 1960 (aged 72); Cleveland, Ohio, U.S.
- Batted: Right Threw: Right

MLB debut
- September 7, 1909, for the Brooklyn Superbas

Last MLB appearance
- September 14, 1909, for the Brooklyn Superbas

MLB statistics
- Batting average: .000
- Home runs: 0
- Runs batted in: 1
- Stats at Baseball Reference

Teams
- Brooklyn Superbas (1909)

Harry John Redmond (September 13, 1887 in Cleveland, Ohio – July 10, 1960 in Cleveland, Ohio), was an American professional baseball player who played second base for the 1909 Brooklyn Superbas. He holds the record for most career plate appearances without reaching base, at 21.
