= Abe Kruger =

American baseball player (1885-1962)

- Pitcher
- Born: February 14, 1885; Morris Run, Pennsylvania
- Died: July 4, 1962 (aged 77); Elmira, New York
- Batted: Right Threw: Right

MLB debut
- October 6, 1908, for the Brooklyn Superbas

Last MLB appearance
- October 7, 1908, for the Brooklyn Superbas

MLB statistics
- Win–loss record: 0–1
- Earned run average: 4.26
- Strikeouts: 2
- Stats at Baseball Reference

Teams
- Brooklyn Superbas (1908)

Abraham Kruger (February 14, 1885 – July 4, 1962) was an American pitcher in Major League Baseball. He appeared in two games for the 1908 Brooklyn Superbas, starting one game and finishing with a 0-1 record in 6.1 innings of work.
