= Phil Reardon =

American baseball player (1883-1920)

- Outfielder
- Born: October 3, 1883; Brooklyn, New York
- Died: September 28, 1920 (aged 36); Brooklyn, New York
- Batted: Right Threw: Right

MLB debut
- September 13, 1906, for the Brooklyn Superbas

Last MLB appearance
- September 20, 1906, for the Brooklyn Superbas

MLB statistics
- Batting average: .071
- Home runs: 0
- Runs batted in: 0
- Stats at Baseball Reference

Teams
- Brooklyn Superbas (1906)

Philip Michael Reardon (October 3, 1883 – September 28, 1920) was a professional baseball player who played outfield in five games for the 1906 Brooklyn Superbas.
