= Hub Knolls =

American baseball player (1883–1946)

- Pitcher
- Born: December 18, 1883; Valparaiso, Indiana, U.S.
- Died: July 1, 1946 (aged 62); Chicago, Illinois, U.S.
- Batted: Unknown Threw: Right

MLB debut
- May 1, 1906, for the Brooklyn Superbas

Last MLB appearance
- May 6, 1906, for the Brooklyn Superbas

MLB statistics
- Win–loss record: 0–0
- Earned run average: 4.05
- Strikeouts: 3
- Stats at Baseball Reference

Teams
- Brooklyn Superbas (1906)

Oscar Edward "Hub" Knolls (December 18, 1883 – July 1, 1946) was an American pitcher in Major League Baseball. He pitched in two games for the 1906 Brooklyn Superbas.

A double in his only at-bat left Knolls with a rare MLB career batting average of 1.000.
