= Jesse Whiting =

American baseball player (1879-1937)

- Pitcher
- Born: May 30, 1879; Philadelphia, Pennsylvania, U.S.
- Died: October 28, 1937 (aged 58); Philadelphia, Pennsylvania, U.S.
- Batted: Unknown Threw: Unknown

MLB debut
- September 27, 1902, for the Philadelphia Phillies

Last MLB appearance
- April 29, 1907, for the Brooklyn Superbas

MLB statistics
- Win–loss record: 1–2
- Earned run average: 4.17
- Strikeouts: 9
- Stats at Baseball Reference

Teams
- Philadelphia Phillies (1902); Brooklyn Superbas (1906–1907)

Jesse Way Whiting (May 30, 1879 – October 28, 1937) was an American pitcher in Major League Baseball. He pitched from 1902 to 1907.
