= Alex Farmer (baseball) =

American baseball player (1877-1920)

- Catcher
- Born: May 9, 1877; New York City, U.S.
- Died: March 5, 1920 (aged 42); The Bronx, New York, U.S.
- Batted: Right Threw: Right

MLB debut
- September 1, 1908, for the Brooklyn Superbas

Last MLB appearance
- September 29, 1908, for the Brooklyn Superbas

MLB statistics
- Batting average: .167
- Home runs: 0
- Runs batted in: 2
- Stats at Baseball Reference

Teams
- Brooklyn Superbas (1908)

Alexander Johnson Farmer (May 9, 1877 – March 5, 1920) was an American professional baseball player who played catcher for the Brooklyn Superbas during the 1908 season, appearing in twelve games with a .167 batting average.
