= Hy Myers =

American baseball player (1889–1965)

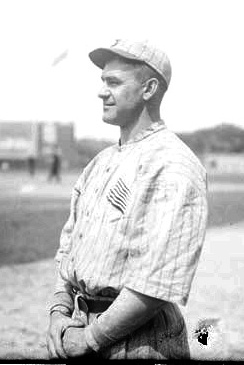
- Center fielder
- Born: April 27, 1889; East Liverpool, Ohio, U.S.
- Died: May 1, 1965 (aged 76); Minerva, Ohio, U.S.
- Batted: Right Threw: Right

MLB debut
- August 30, 1909, for the Brooklyn Superbas

Last MLB appearance
- May 3, 1925, for the St. Louis Cardinals

MLB statistics
- Batting average: .281
- Home runs: 32
- Runs batted in: 559
- Stats at Baseball Reference

Teams
- Brooklyn Superbas/Dodgers/Robins (1909, 1911, 1914–1922); St. Louis Cardinals (1923–1925); Cincinnati Reds (1925)

Career highlights and awards
- NL RBI leader (1919)

Henry Harrison "Hy" Myers (April 27, 1889 – May 1, 1965) was a professional baseball player. He was an outfielder over all or part of 14 seasons (1909–1925) with the Brooklyn Superbas/Robins, St. Louis Cardinals, and Cincinnati Reds.

In 1919 he led the National League in RBIs (73), triples (14), slugging (.436) and total bases (223). He appeared in 154 games the next year for the pennant-winning Robins, again leading the league in triples (22). He participated in the 1916 and 1920 World Series for Brooklyn, losing both times and hitting only .208 (10-48).

In a 14-year career, Myers was a .281 hitter (1380-4910) with 32 home runs, 555 runs, 179 doubles, 100 triples and 559 RBI in 1,310 games played. As a member of the Dodgers he had four 5-hit games.

He was born in 1889 in East Liverpool, Ohio, and died on May 1, 1965, in Minerva, Ohio, at the age of 76. He was buried in Grove Hill Cemetery in Hanoverton, Ohio.

== See also ==
- List of Major League Baseball career triples leaders
- List of Major League Baseball annual runs batted in leaders
- List of Major League Baseball annual triples leaders
