= Tom Catterson =

American baseball player

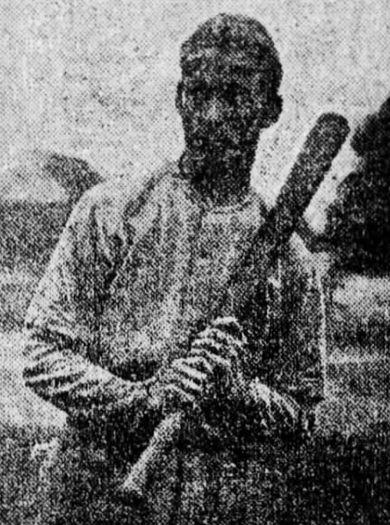
- Outfielder
- Born: August 25, 1884; Warwick, Rhode Island, U.S.
- Died: February 5, 1920 (aged 35); Portland, Maine, U.S.
- Batted: Left Threw: Left

MLB debut
- September 19, 1908, for the Brooklyn Superbas

Last MLB appearance
- May 24, 1909, for the Brooklyn Superbas

MLB statistics
- Batting average: .198
- Home runs: 1
- Runs batted in: 3
- Stats at Baseball Reference

Teams
- Brooklyn Superbas (1908–1909)

Thomas Henry Catterson (August 25, 1884 – February 5, 1920) was an American professional baseball player "TomCat" who played outfield from 1908 to 1909 for the Brooklyn Superbas. He graduated in 1905 with a business degree from Villanova University and was their star pitcher, having gained fame in defeating Georgetown University in a key playoff game in 1905. His wife Mary Conroy Catterson was from the "Giant Conroy" family so famous in Maine sports.

He died from flu at his home in Portland, Maine on February 5, 1920.
