= Doc Casey =

American baseball player (1870–1936)

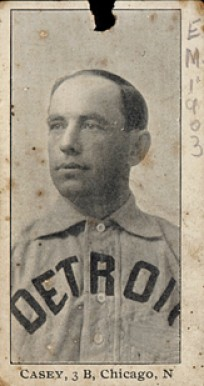
- Third baseman
- Born: March 15, 1870; Lawrence, Massachusetts, U.S.
- Died: December 31, 1936 (aged 66); Detroit, Michigan, U.S.
- Batted: Switch Threw: Right

MLB debut
- September 14, 1898, for the Washington Senators

Last MLB appearance
- October 5, 1907, for the Brooklyn Superbas

MLB statistics
- Batting average: .258
- Home runs: 9
- Runs batted in: 354
- Stats at Baseball Reference

Teams
- Washington Senators (1898–1899); Brooklyn Superbas (1899–1900); Detroit Tigers (1901–1902); Chicago Cubs (1903–1905); Brooklyn Superbas (1906–1907)

James Patrick Casey (March 15, 1870 – December 31, 1936) was an American professional baseball third baseman. He played ten seasons in Major League Baseball (MLB) between 1898 and 1907 for the Washington Senators, Brooklyn Superbas, Detroit Tigers, and Chicago Cubs.

== Early years ==
Casey was born in Lawrence, Massachusetts, in 1870. He studied dentistry at Baltimore Medical College, but left to play baseball in 1892 for the Pawtucket baseball team in the New England League. Casey reportedly earned the nickname "Doc" because he sometimes used his knowledge of dentistry to assist fellow baseball players with their teeth.

From 1893 to 1894, Casey attended Maryland Agricultural College and played on its baseball team. He also continued to play baseball in the New England League, for Lawrence, Massachusetts in 1893 and Portland, Maine in 1894.

== Professional baseball career ==
=== Toronto Canucks ===
From 1894 to 1898, Casey played for the Toronto Canucks in the Eastern League. In 1898, he compiled a .328 batting average with 66 stolen bases, 41 extra base hits, and 123 runs scored in 122 games for Toronto.

=== Washington Senators ===
Casey made his major league debut with the Washington Senators in September 1898. He appeared in 28 games for the Senators in 1898, principally as a third baseman, and compiled a .277 batting average with 15 stolen bases. The Senators finished in 11th place in 1898 with a 51–101 record.

=== Brooklyn Superbas ===
In April 1899, Casey was traded from Washington, one of the worst teams in the National League, to the Brooklyn Superbas, one of the best teams in the league.

Early in the season, Casey drew attention for his defensive play at third base. Casey appeared in 143 games and stole 27 bases and helped lead the 1899 Brooklyn club to the National League championship and a 101–47 record. Casey ranked second among National League third basemen in 1899 with 23 double plays turned. The 1899 Superbas had the two shortest players in the National League in Casey (5', 6") and Wee Willie Keeler (5', 4").

Casey appeared in only one game for Brooklyn in 1900. In May 1900, Sporting Life reported that Casey had been "loaned" by the Brooklyn club to the Detroit Tigers of the newly formed American League. Sporting Life reported on the reaction to Casey's departure: "Brooklyn cranks will be sorry to see the little fellow depart, for he came to this city when the club was in a bad way, and did a great deal to bring the championship to the nine, when it looked for a time as if it might not be won because of the injuries to players. With [Lave] Cross on the team there was no place for Casey as a matter of course. He will be better off with something to do every day than he possibly could be sitting on the bench all the time. He isn't the kind of ball player who cares to ornament the bench."

=== Detroit Tigers ===
Casey became the Tigers starting third baseman in 1900, appearing in 115 games for the club. In October 1900, Sporting Life selected Casey as the best fielding third baseman in the American League.

Casey remained with the Tigers in 1901 and 1902, the team's first two seasons as a major league club. In 1901, Casey led the American League in both double plays turned by a third baseman (25) and in errors by a third baseman (58). He also ranked second in the American League in 1901 with a career high 324 assists at third base and ninth in the league with 34 stolen bases.

=== Chicago Cubs ===
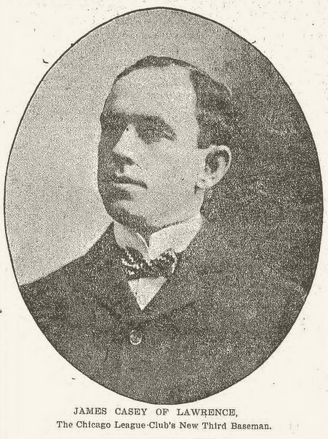
Casey in 1903

Prior to the start of the 1903 season, Casey jumped from the Tigers to the Chicago Cubs. He was the Cubs starting third baseman from 1903 to 1905. During Casey's three years with the Cubs, he was the fourth member of the infield that included Tinker to Evers to Chance. The Cubs finished in third, second, and third place in the National League from 1903 to 1905. In 1905, he led all National League third basemen with a .949 fielding percentage. He also had the seventh highest defensive Wins Above Replacement rating among all position players – higher even than Evers and Chance.

=== Brooklyn Superbas (second stint) ===
In December 1905, Casey was traded by the Cubs to the Brooklyn Superbas in a deal that sent outfielder Jimmy Sheckard to the Cubs. Sheckard was a starter for Cubs teams that won three consecutive pennants from 1906 to 1908. Casey, on the other hand, joined a team that had finished in eighth place in 1905. Casey became Brooklyn's starting third baseman in both 1906 and 1907. During the 1907 season, despite being one of the oldest players in the National League, Casey continued to perform well defensively, compiling the second highest fielding percentage (.955) among the league's third basemen. He also compiled a career high 176 putouts at third base in 1907 – the third highest total by any National League third baseman that year. Casey appeared in his last major league game on October 5, 1907.

=== Major league career statistics ===
In his 10-year major league career, Casey compiled 1,312 putouts at third base, a figure which, at the time of his retirement, ranked 10th in major league history (the only third basemen with more putouts at the time Casey retired were Jimmy Collins (14 seasons), Lave Cross (21 season), Billy Nash (15 seasons), Arlie Latham (17 season), Billy Shindle (13 seasons), Jerry Denny (13 seasons), Denny Lyons (13 seasons), Hick Carpenter (12 seasons), and George Pinkney (10 seasons)). He also had 2,184 assists and 325 errors at third base, a career batting average of .258 with 9 home runs, 354 RBI and 191 stolen bases.

=== Montreal Royals ===
After the 1907 season, Brooklyn sold Casey to the Jersey City Club, which in turn sold him to the Montreal Royals of the Eastern League. He served as the Royals manager in 1908 and 1909 and also appeared in 251 games as a player.

== Later years ==
In 1910, he worked as a scout for the Detroit Tigers. In November 1910, Casey was hired to manage the Fort Wayne Brakies in the Central League for the 1911 season.

After retiring from baseball, Casey maintained a dentistry practice in Detroit. He later purchased a drug store in Detroit (at the corner of Woodward Avenue and Adelaide Street). Casey's drug store reportedly "became known to thousands of fans as headquarters of the city's Winter Stove League." He also worked in later years as a city permit inspector and a guard at the municipal court in Detroit.

On New Year's Eve 1936, Casey died in Detroit at the age of 66. He suffered a stroke and had been in ill health thereafter. He was interred at the Mount Olivet Cemetery in Detroit.
