= Elmer Stricklett =

American baseball player (1876–1964)

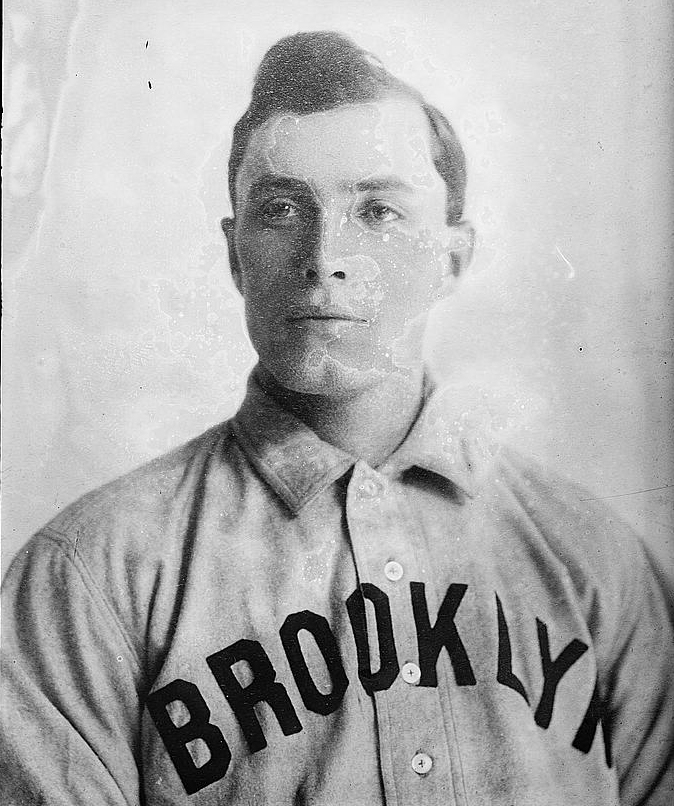
- Pitcher
- Born: August 29, 1876; Glasco, Kansas, U.S.
- Died: June 7, 1964 (aged 87); Santa Cruz, California, U.S.
- Batted: Right Threw: Right

MLB debut
- April 22, 1904, for the Chicago White Sox

Last MLB appearance
- September 24, 1907, for the Brooklyn Superbas

MLB statistics
- Win–loss record: 35–51
- Earned run average: 2.84
- Strikeouts: 237
- Stats at Baseball Reference

Teams
- Chicago White Sox (1904); Brooklyn Superbas (1905–1907)

Elmer Griffin Stricklett (August 29, 1876 – June 7, 1964) was an American professional baseball pitcher. He pitched in Major League Baseball for the Chicago White Sox and Brooklyn Superbas from 1904 through 1907. Including his time in minor league baseball, Stricklett pitched professionally from 1897 through 1912.

Stricklett is considered one of the pioneers of the spitball. He learned the pitch while playing in the minor leagues. He later taught the spitball to Ed Walsh and Jack Chesbro, both of whom were elected to the National Baseball Hall of Fame.

== Career ==
Stricklett attended Santa Clara University, where he played college baseball for the Santa Clara Broncos baseball team. He began his professional career in minor league baseball with the Topeka Colts of the Kansas State League in 1897. In 1898, he pitched for the Salina Blues and Atchison Huskers of the Kansas State League, before joining the Dallas Colts of the Class-C Texas League later that year. He pitched for the Rock Island Islanders of the Class-B Western Association and Kansas City Blues of the Class-A Western League in 1899. Despite pitching to a 14–1 win–loss record in 1899, Kansas City released Stricklett to the Wheeling Stogies of the Class-B Interstate League in 1900.

Stricklett split the 1900 season with Wheeling and the Toledo Mud Hens, also of the Interstate League, pitching to a 13–8 record. In 1901, Stricklett pitched for the Toledo Swamp Angels of the Western Association and Sacramento Senators of the California League, compiling a 27–22 record. In 1902, he pitched for the Newark Sailors of the Class-A Eastern League and the Sacramento Gilt Edges of the California League, finishing the season with a 23–22 record. While pitching for Sacramento, Stricklett mastered the spitball. In 1903, Stricklett pitched for Los Angeles and the Seattle Chinooks of the Pacific National League, going 24-8.

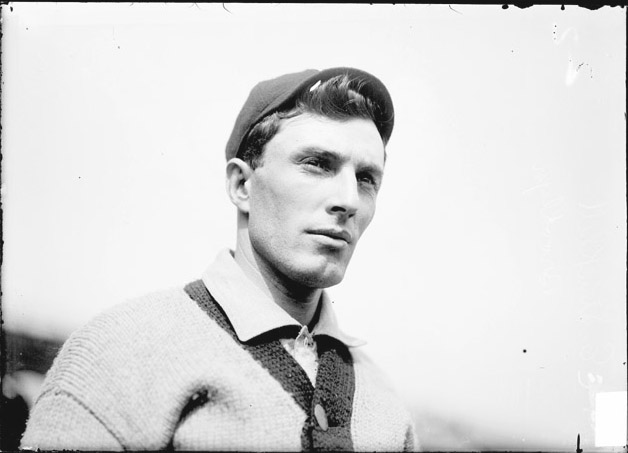
Stricklett with the Superbas in 1905

The Chicago White Sox of the American League (AL) invited Stricklett to spring training in 1904, where he roomed with Ed Walsh. Stricklett taught Walsh the spitball. After pitching in one game for the White Sox, allowing eight earned runs in seven IP, he received his release, and pitched for the Milwaukee Brewers of the Class-A American Association for the remainder of the season, where he pitched to a 24-11 record in 267 innings pitched (IP). The Boston Americans of the AL purchased the rights to Stricklett in August 1904, but allowed him to remain in Milwaukee.

The Brooklyn Superbas of the National League (NL) chose Stricklett from Milwaukee after the 1904 season in the Rule 5 draft. He debuted with the Superbas in the 1905 season, pitching to a 9–18 record and a 3.34 earned run average (ERA) in 237 1/3 IP. His 18 losses were ninth most in the league. Among NL pitchers, only Stricklett and Deacon Phillippe allowed no home runs that season. In 1906, Stricklett went 14–18 with a 2.72 ERA in 291 2/3 IP, the ninth most losses and IP in the NL that season. He appeared in 41 games, tied for fifth in the NL with Vic Willis and Jake Weimer, and his 28 complete games and five shutouts were both tied for tenth most in the NL. However, he also allowed 88 earned runs, sixth most in the league.

Stricklett pitched on Opening Day for the Superbas in 1907, a game the Superbas lost. That year, Stricklett had a 12–14 record and a 2.27 ERA in 229 2/3 IP. His 25 complete games were eighth best in the NL, while his four shutouts tied for tenth. In four MLB seasons, Stricklett went 35–51 with a 2.84 ERA and 10 shutouts.

After the 1907 season, Stricklett returned to the California League to pitch for the San Jose Prune Prickers and Sacramento Sacts, and refused to report to Brooklyn in 1908 as his wife wanted him to remain closer to their California home. As the California League was not recognized in organized baseball at this time, Stricklett was banned by MLB for four years. Though he applied for reinstatement, his banishment was upheld. Stricklett continued to pitch for San Jose through 1910, pitching to a 23-12 record in 1909 and a 19-14 record in 1910.

After the 1910 season, Stricklett he retired from baseball. However, he applied for reinstatement in 1912, which was granted by the National Baseball Commission. Stricklett was fined $100 ($3,336 in current dollar terms) for playing outside organized baseball for the previous three years. The Superbas sold his rights to the Binghamton Bingoes of the New York State League, and he pitched for the team. In minor league baseball, Stricklett won 20 games in a season at least five times, compiling a 169-99 record across nine seasons.

=== Spitball ===
Stricklett denied inventing the spitball, though he claimed to be the first pitcher to master the spitball and to feature it exclusively. To achieve the pitch, he would moisten the ball with a spot the size of two of his fingers. The pitch would act "exactly the same way as reverse English does on a billiard ball".

Stricklett learned the spitball from minor league teammate George Hildebrand in 1902, who learned about it from Frank Corridon. Stricklett played an important role in popularizing the spitball. Stricklett taught the spitball to Jack Chesbro, who saw him use the pitch while pitching in minor league baseball. Though Chesbro had experimented with the pitch in the minor leagues, Stricklett showed him how to master it in 1904. Stricklett taught it to Ed Walsh while they roomed together with the White Sox.

== Later life ==
Stricklett retired to Mountain View, California, where he grew apricots on a ranch. He died in Santa Cruz, California, at the age of 87. In 2018, it was announced that he would be inducted into the Kansas Baseball Hall of Fame on Saturday, January 26, 2019.

Stricklett was interred at Alta Mesa Memorial Park.

== See also ==
- List of Brooklyn Dodgers Opening Day starting pitchers
- List of Santa Clara University people

Sporting positions
| Preceded by Harry McIntire | Brooklyn Superbas Opening Day Starting pitcher 1907 | Succeeded by Nap Rucker |
