= Emil Batch =

American baseball player (1880-1926)

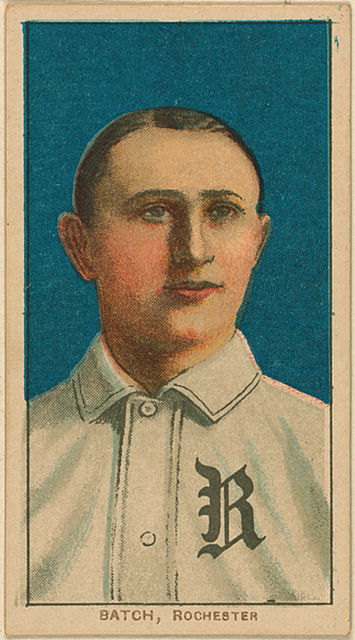
- Third baseman / Outfielder
- Born: January 21, 1880; Brooklyn, New York, U.S.
- Died: August 23, 1926 (aged 46); Brooklyn, New York, U.S.
- Batted: Right Threw: Right

MLB debut
- September 13, 1904, for the Brooklyn Superbas

Last MLB appearance
- October 5, 1907, for the Brooklyn Superbas

MLB statistics
- Batting average: .251
- Home runs: 7
- Runs batted in: 98
- Stats at Baseball Reference

Teams
- Brooklyn Superbas (1904–1907)

Emil Batch (January 21, 1880 – August 23, 1926) was an American professional baseball player who played third base and outfielder from 1904 to 1907 for the Brooklyn Superbas.
