= John Butler (baseball) =

American baseball player (1879–1950)

- Catcher
- Born: July 26, 1879; Boston, Massachusetts, U.S.
- Died: February 2, 1950 (aged 70); Boston, Massachusetts, U.S.
- Batted: Right Threw: Right

MLB debut
- September 28, 1901, for the Milwaukee Brewers

Last MLB appearance
- June 14, 1907, for the Brooklyn Superbas

MLB statistics
- Batting average: .134
- Home runs: 0
- Runs batted in: 3
- Stats at Baseball Reference

Teams
- Milwaukee Brewers (1901); St. Louis Cardinals (1904); Brooklyn Superbas (1906–1907)

John Albert Butler (a.k.a. Frederick King) (July 26, 1879 – February 2, 1950) was an American professional baseball player who played catcher from 1901 to 1907. He attended Fordham University and was later a coach for the Chicago White Sox.
