= Jack McCarthy (baseball) =

American baseball player (1869–1948)

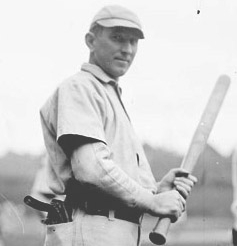
- Outfielder
- Born: March 26, 1869; Hardwick, Massachusetts, U.S.
- Died: February 1, 1948 (aged 78); Chicago, Illinois, U.S.
- Batted: Left Threw: Left

MLB debut
- August 3, 1893, for the Cincinnati Reds

Last MLB appearance
- May 25, 1907, for the Brooklyn Superbas

MLB statistics
- Batting average: .287
- Hits: 1,205
- Home runs: 8
- Stats at Baseball Reference

Teams
- Cincinnati Reds (1893–1894); Pittsburgh Pirates (1898–1899); Chicago Orphans (1900); Cleveland Blues / Bronchos / Naps (1901–1903); Chicago Cubs (1903–1905); Brooklyn Superbas (1906–1907)

John Arthur McCarthy (March 26, 1869 – February 1, 1948) was an American professional baseball outfielder. He played in Major League Baseball for the Cincinnati Reds, Pittsburgh Pirates, Chicago Orphans, Cleveland Blues / Bronchos / Naps, Chicago Cubs and Brooklyn Superbas. In 1092 games spanning over 12 seasons, McCarthy recorded a .287 batting average with 551 runs, 171 doubles, 66 triples, 8 home runs, 476 RBI and 145 stolen bases. He ended his career with a .947 fielding percentage.

His last home run was hit in 1899, and from 1900 to the present no one has had more at-bats without a home run: 2,736. In 1904, McCarthy suffered an unusual injury when he tripped over the broom used by the umpire to clean home plate, and injured his ankle. Soon afterwards, a rule specified that umpires would clean home plate with a whisk broom and store it in their pocket when not in use. On April 26, 1905, McCarthy is the first fielder to throw out three base runners at home plate, achieving the feat against the Pittsburgh Pirates.

He attended Holy Cross College before joining the major leagues. In 1899, he married Jessie Halpin. After his playing days, he remained in baseball for a time as a minor league manager, then took other jobs, being listed in 1930 as a clerk in a Chicago probate court.
