= Billy Maloney =

American baseball player (1878–1960)

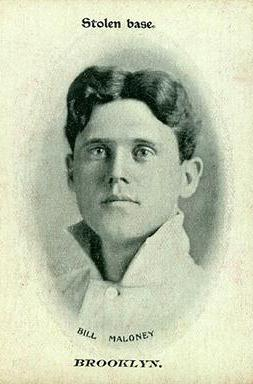
- Outfielder
- Born: June 5, 1878; Lewiston, Maine, U.S.
- Died: September 2, 1960 (aged 82); Breckenridge, Texas, U.S.
- Batted: Left Threw: Right

MLB debut
- May 2, 1901, for the Milwaukee Brewers

Last MLB appearance
- October 6, 1908, for the Brooklyn Superbas

MLB statistics
- Batting average: .236
- Home runs: 6
- Runs batted in: 177
- Stats at Baseball Reference

Teams
- Milwaukee Brewers / St. Louis Browns (1901–1902); Cincinnati Reds (1902); Chicago Cubs (1905); Brooklyn Superbas (1906–1908)

Career highlights and awards
- NL stolen base leader (1905)

William Alphonse Maloney (June 5, 1878 – September 2, 1960) was an American professional baseball outfielder. He played in Major League Baseball (MLB) for the Milwaukee Brewers / Browns, Cincinnati Reds, Chicago Cubs, and Brooklyn Superbas between 1901 and 1908.

Maloney led the National League in stolen bases (59) in 1905. In six seasons, he played in 696 games and had 2,476 at-bats, 585 hits, 294 runs, 177 runs batted in, 155 stolen bases, and a .236 batting average.

An alumnus of Georgetown University, he died in Breckenridge, Texas at the age of 82.

== See also ==
- List of Major League Baseball annual stolen base leaders
