= Phil Lewis (baseball) =

American baseball player (1883-1959)

Phil Marty
- Shortstop
- Born: October 7, 1883; Pittsburgh, Pennsylvania, U.S.
- Died: August 8, 1959 (aged 75); Port Wentworth, Georgia, U.S.
- Batted: Right Threw: Right

MLB debut
- April 14, 1905, for the Brooklyn Superbas

Last MLB appearance
- September 29, 1908, for the Brooklyn Superbas

MLB statistics
- Batting average: .242
- Home runs: 4
- Runs batted in: 130
- Stats at Baseball Reference

Teams
- Brooklyn Superbas (1905–1908)

Philip Lewis (October 7, 1883 in Pittsburgh, Pennsylvania – August 8, 1959 in Port Wentworth, Georgia), was an American professional baseball player who played shortstop from 1905 to 1908 for the Brooklyn Superbas. He attended Cornell University and served in World War I.
