= Al Burch =

American baseball player (1883–1926)

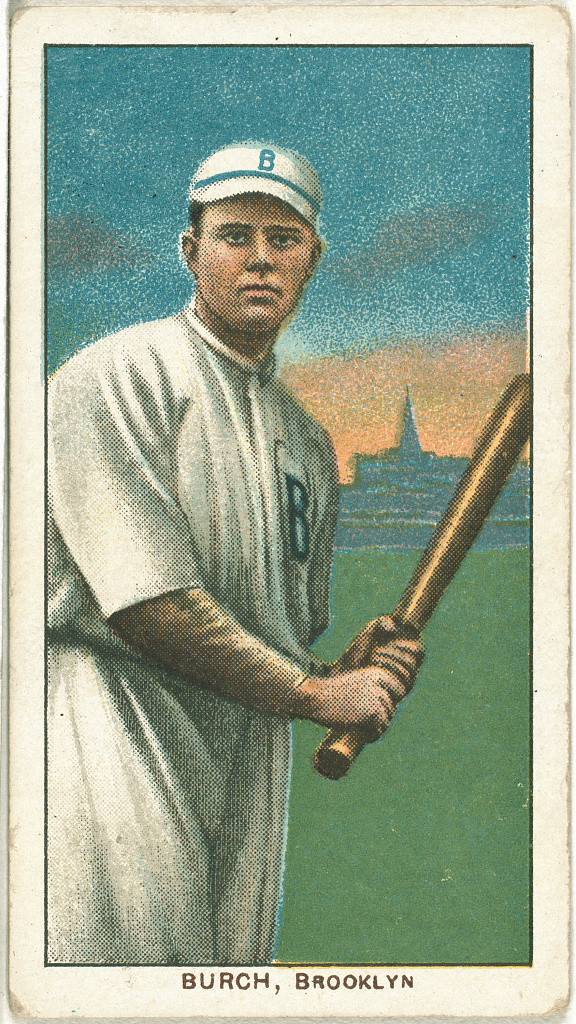
- Burch depicted on a T206 tobacco card
- Outfielder
- Born: October 7, 1883; Albany, New York, U.S.
- Died: October 5, 1926 (aged 42); Brooklyn, New York, U.S.
- Batted: Left Threw: Right

MLB debut
- June 19, 1906, for the St. Louis Cardinals

Last MLB appearance
- July 30, 1911, for the Brooklyn Dodgers

MLB statistics
- Batting average: .254
- Home runs: 4
- Runs batted in: 103
- Stats at Baseball Reference

Teams
- St. Louis Cardinals (1906–1907); Brooklyn Superbas/Dodgers (1907–1911)

Albert William Burch (October 7, 1883 – October 5, 1926) was an American professional baseball player who played outfield from 1906 to 1911 for the St. Louis Cardinals and the Brooklyn Dodgers.

In 611 games over six seasons, Burch posted a .254 batting average (554-for-2185) with 254 runs, 48 doubles, 20 triples, 4 home runs, 103 RBIs, 96 stolen bases, 186 bases on balls, .312 on-base percentage and .299 slugging percentage. He finished his career with a .953 fielding percentage playing at all three outfield positions and first and second base.
