= Doc Scanlan =

American baseball player (1881–1949)

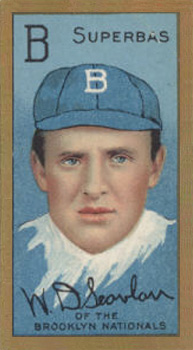
- Pitcher
- Born: March 7, 1881; Syracuse, New York, U.S.
- Died: May 29, 1949 (aged 68); Brooklyn, New York, U.S.
- Batted: Left Threw: Right

MLB debut
- September 24, 1903, for the Pittsburgh Pirates

Last MLB appearance
- September 1, 1911, for the Brooklyn Dodgers

MLB statistics
- Win–loss record: 65–71
- Earned run average: 3.00
- Strikeouts: 584
- Stats at Baseball Reference

Teams
- Pittsburgh Pirates (1903–1904); Brooklyn Superbas/Dodgers (1904–1907, 1909–1911)

William Dennis Scanlan (March 7, 1881 – May 29, 1949) was an American pitcher in Major League Baseball. Scanlan pitched from 1903 to 1911 with the Pittsburgh Pirates and Brooklyn Dodgers.
