= Jim Pastorius =

American baseball player (1881–1941)

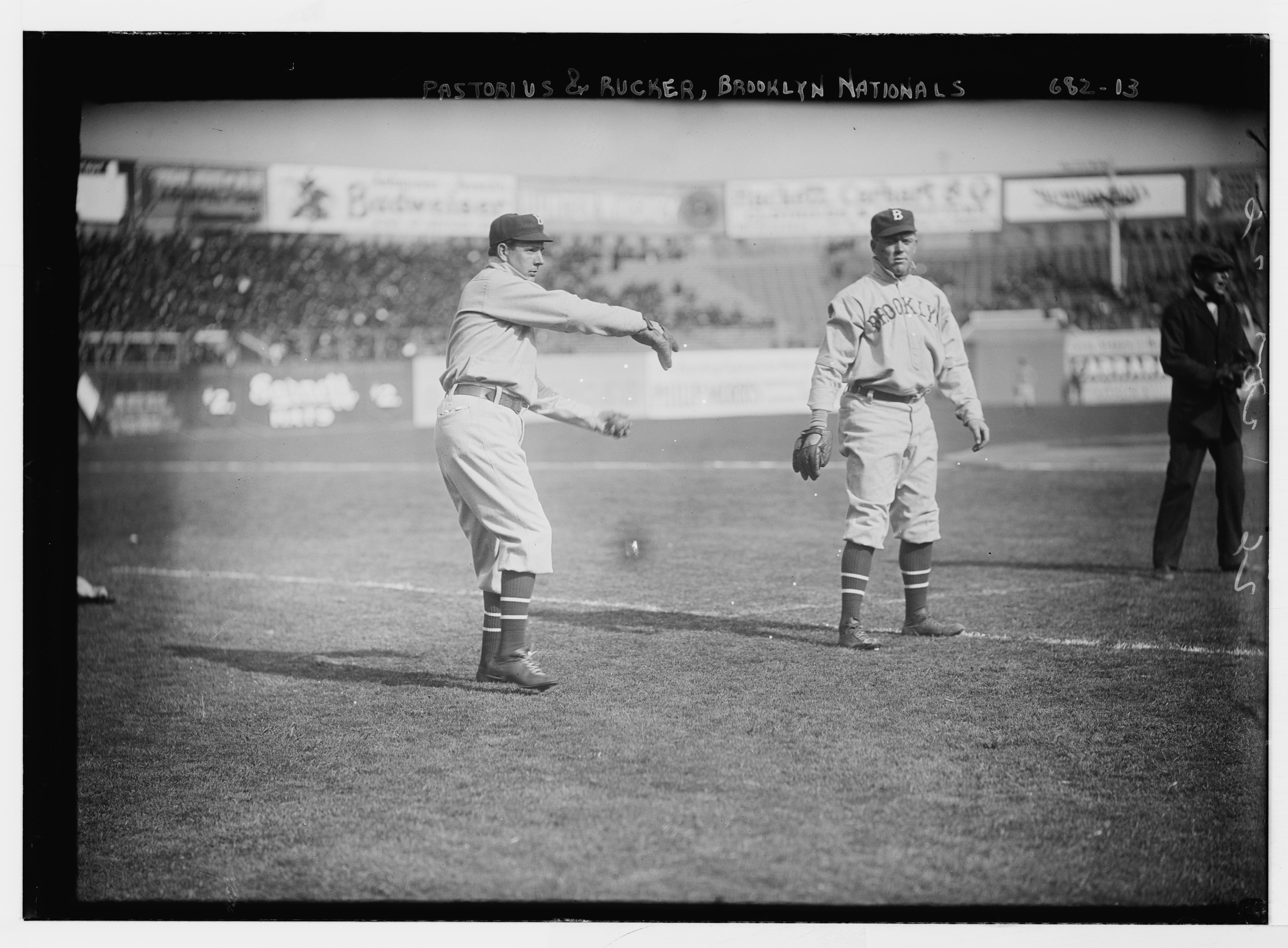
- Pitcher
- Born: July 12, 1881; Pittsburgh, Pennsylvania, US
- Died: May 10, 1941 (aged 59); Pittsburgh, Pennsylvania, US
- Batted: Left Threw: Left

MLB debut
- April 15, 1906, for the Brooklyn Superbas

Last MLB appearance
- August 23, 1909, for the Brooklyn Superbas

MLB statistics
- Win–loss record: 31–55
- Earned run average: 3.12
- Strikeouts: 205
- Stats at Baseball Reference

Teams
- Brooklyn Superbas (1906–1909)

James Washington "Sunny Jim" Pastorius (July 12, 1881 in Pittsburgh, Pennsylvania – May 10, 1941 in Pittsburgh, Pennsylvania) was a pitcher in Major League Baseball. He pitched from 1906 to 1909 for the Brooklyn Superbas.
