= Lew Ritter =

American baseball player (1875-1952)

- Catcher
- Born: September 7, 1875; Liverpool, Pennsylvania, U.S.
- Died: May 27, 1952 (aged 76); Harrisburg, Pennsylvania, U.S.
- Batted: Right Threw: Right

MLB debut
- September 10, 1902, for the Brooklyn Superbas

Last MLB appearance
- August 29, 1908, for the Brooklyn Superbas

MLB statistics
- Batting average: .219
- Home runs: 1
- Runs batted in: 120
- Stats at Baseball Reference

Teams
- Brooklyn Superbas (1902–1908)

Lewis Elmer Ritter (September 7, 1875 – May 27, 1952) was an American Major League Baseball catcher who played for the Brooklyn Superbas from 1902 to 1908.
