= John Hummel =

American baseball player (1883-1959)

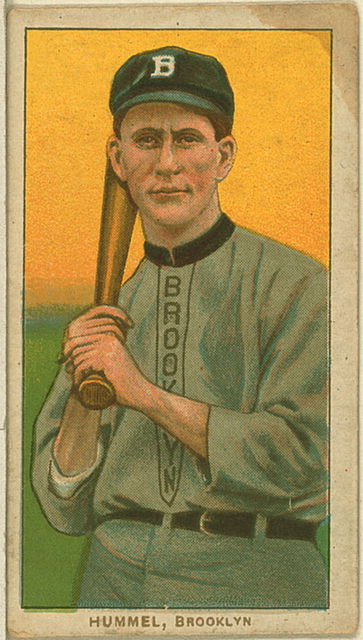
- Second baseman / Outfielder / First baseman
- Born: April 4, 1883; Bloomsburg, Pennsylvania, U.S.
- Died: May 18, 1959 (aged 76); Springfield, Massachusetts, U.S.
- Batted: Right Threw: Right

MLB debut
- September 12, 1905, for the Brooklyn Superbas

Last MLB appearance
- September 2, 1918, for the New York Yankees

MLB statistics
- Batting average: .254
- Home runs: 29
- Runs batted in: 394
- Stats at Baseball Reference

Teams
- Brooklyn Superbas/Dodgers/Robins (1905–1915); New York Yankees (1918)

John Edwin Hummel (April 4, 1883 – May 18, 1959), born in Bloomsburg, Pennsylvania, was an American utility player for the Brooklyn Superbas/Brooklyn Dodgers/Brooklyn Robins (1905–15) and New York Yankees (1918). He attended college at Bloomsburg University of Pennsylvania.

In 1161 games over 12 seasons, Hummel posted a .254 batting average (991-for-3906) with 421 runs, 128 doubles, 84 triples, 29 home runs, 394 RBIs, 119 stolen bases, 346 bases on balls, .316 on-base percentage and .352 slugging percentage. He finished his career with a .969 fielding percentage playing at all three outfield positions and first base, second base and shortstop.

After baseball, Hummel worked for the Diamond Match Company in Springfield, Massachusetts from 1931 to 1957, where he also managed a semi-professional baseball team for the company. Hummel died at Mercy Hospital in Springfield on May 18, 1953.

== Sources ==
- Career statistics from Baseball Reference · Baseball Reference (Minors) · Retrosheet · Baseball Almanac
