= Tim Jordan (baseball) =

American baseball player (1879–1949)

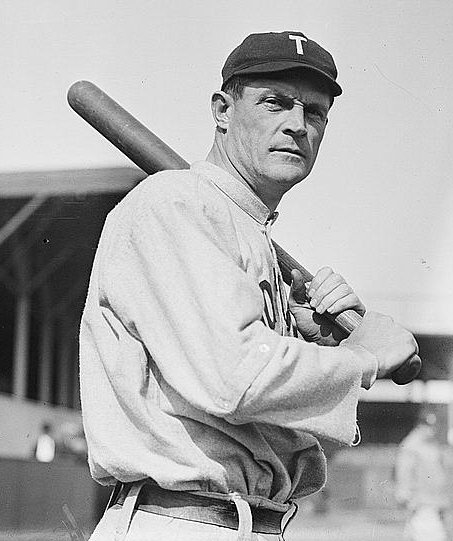
- First baseman
- Born: February 14, 1879; New York City, U.S.
- Died: September 13, 1949 (aged 70); Bronx, New York, U.S.
- Batted: Left Threw: Right

MLB debut
- August 10, 1901, for the Washington Senators

Last MLB appearance
- May 2, 1910, for the Brooklyn Superbas

MLB statistics
- Batting average: .261
- Home runs: 32
- Runs batted in: 232
- Stats at Baseball Reference

Teams
- Washington Senators (1901); New York Highlanders (1903); Brooklyn Superbas (1906–1910)

Career highlights and awards
- 2× NL home run leader (1906, 1908)

Timothy Joseph Jordan (February 14, 1879 – September 13, 1949) was a professional baseball player. He was a first baseman over parts of seven seasons with the Washington Senators, New York Highlanders and Brooklyn Superbas. He led the National League and tied for the major league lead in home runs in 1906, becoming the first rookie with a share of the major league home run crown (later joined by Mark McGwire in 1987 and Pete Alonso in 2019) with Brooklyn, and won the NL home run title again in 1908.

Jordan also created and marketed a baseball-themed card game, the "T.J. Jordan In Door Card Game". He was born and later died at the age of 70 in New York City.

== See also ==
- List of Major League Baseball annual home run leaders
