= Harry Lumley (baseball) =

American baseball player and manager (1880-1938)

- Right fielder
- Born: September 29, 1880; Forest City, Pennsylvania, U.S.
- Died: May 22, 1938 (aged 57); Binghamton, New York, U.S.
- Batted: Left Threw: Left

MLB debut
- April 14, 1904, for the Brooklyn Superbas

Last MLB appearance
- May 19, 1910, for the Brooklyn Superbas

MLB statistics
- Batting average: .274
- Home runs: 38
- Runs batted in: 305
- Stats at Baseball Reference

Teams
- As player: Brooklyn Superbas (1904–1910); As manager: Brooklyn Superbas (1909)

Career highlights and awards
- NL home run leader (1904)

Harry Garfield Lumley (September 29, 1880 – May 22, 1938) was an American right fielder and manager in Major League Baseball. He spent his entire career with the Brooklyn Superbas in the National League.

== Career ==
Lumley was born in Forest City, Pennsylvania, in 1880. In 1901, he started his professional baseball career with Rome of the New York State League. He batted .350. The following season, he played for St. Paul of the American Association and led the league with 18 home runs. In 1903, Lumley joined Seattle of the Pacific Coast League and led the league with a .387 batting average. After the season, he was drafted by the Superbas.

In Lumley's first major league season, he batted .279 for Brooklyn and led the NL with nine home runs and 18 triples. Since then, only one other first-year player (Ralph Kiner in 1946) has led his league in home runs.

He then batted .293 in 1905. In 1906, he batted .324 with nine home runs and 12 triples. In 1907, he batted .267 with nine home runs. Suffering from an ankle injury, Lumley struggled in 1908 and finished with a batting average of .216. He was named Brooklyn's manager for 1909. That year, he appeared in 55 games as a player and batted .250 with no home runs. The Superbas had a record of 55–98, and Lumley was replaced as manager before the 1910 season. He appeared in eight games in 1910 before being released.

In 730 games over seven seasons, Lumley posted a .274 batting average (728-for-2653) with 300 runs, 109 doubles, 66 triples, 38 home runs, 305 RBI, 110 stolen bases, 204 bases on balls, .328 on-base percentage and .408 slugging percentage. He finished his career with a .946 fielding percentage as a right fielder.

After his MLB career ended, Lumley operated a tavern. He died in Binghamton, New York, in 1938.

== See also ==
- List of Major League Baseball annual home run leaders
- List of Major League Baseball annual triples leaders
- List of Major League Baseball player-managers
