= Harry McIntire =

American baseball player (1879–1949)

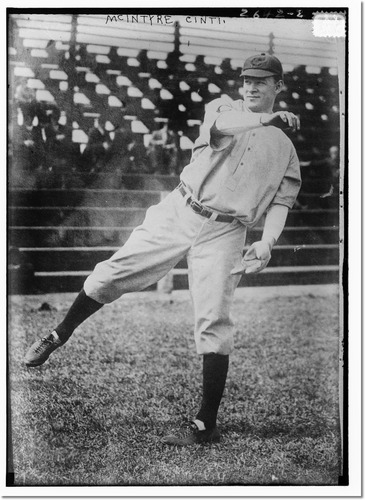
- Pitcher
- Born: January 11, 1879; Dayton, Ohio, U.S.
- Died: January 9, 1949 (aged 69); Daytona Beach, Florida, U.S.
- Batted: Right Threw: Right

MLB debut
- April 14, 1905, for the Brooklyn Superbas

Last MLB appearance
- April 22, 1913, for the Cincinnati Reds

MLB statistics
- Win–loss record: 71–117
- Earned run average: 3.22
- Strikeouts: 626
- Stats at Baseball Reference

Teams
- Brooklyn Superbas (1905–1909); Chicago Cubs (1910–1912); Cincinnati Reds (1913)

John Reid McIntire (January 11, 1879 – January 9, 1949) was an American pitcher for the Brooklyn Superbas (1905–1909), Chicago Cubs (1910–1912) and Cincinnati Reds (1913).

He helped the Cubs win the 1910 National League Pennant.

McIntire led the National League in Hits Allowed (340), Earned Runs Allowed (127) and Hit Batsmen (20) in 1905. He also led the league in Hits Batsmen in 1908 (20) and 1909 (21).

In 9 seasons he had a 71–117 Win–loss record, 237 Games, 188 Games Started, 140 Complete Games, 17 Shutouts, 40 Games Finished, 7 Saves, 1,650 Innings Pitched, 1,555 Hits Allowed, 778 Runs Allowed, 590 Earned Runs Allowed, 34 Home Runs Allowed, 539 Walks Allowed, 626 Strikeouts, 96 Hit Batsmen, 14 Wild Pitches, 6,753 Batters Faced and 3.22 ERA.

McIntire was good with the bat, posting a .218 batting average (134-for-615) scoring 54 runs, 2 home runs, 39 RBIs and drawing 29 bases on balls in his nine-year major league career.

McIntire died in Daytona Beach, Florida at the age of 69.

== See also ==
- List of Major League Baseball career hit batsmen leaders

== Sources ==
- Career statistics from Baseball Reference · Retrosheet · Baseball Almanac

Preceded by Oscar Jones	Brooklyn Superbas Opening Day; Starting pitcher 1906	Succeeded by Elmer Stricklett
