= Whitey Alperman =

American baseball player

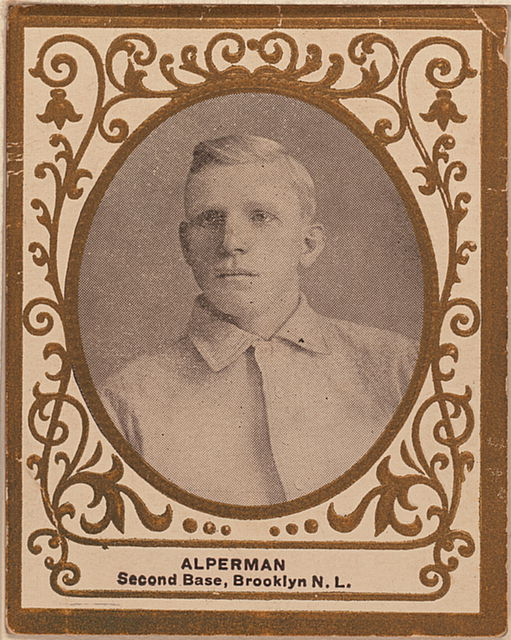
- Second baseman
- Born: November 11, 1879; Etna, Pennsylvania, U.S.
- Died: December 25, 1942 (aged 63); Pittsburgh, Pennsylvania, U.S.
- Batted: Right Threw: Right

MLB debut
- April 13, 1906, for the Brooklyn Superbas

Last MLB appearance
- October 2, 1909, for the Brooklyn Superbas

MLB statistics
- Batting average: .237
- Home runs: 7
- Runs batted in: 141
- Stats at Baseball Reference

Teams
- Brooklyn Superbas (1906–1909)

Charles Augustus "Whitey" Alperman (November 11, 1879 – December 25, 1942) was an American Major League Baseball (MLB) second baseman who played for the Brooklyn Superbas from 1906 to 1909. In 1907, he tied for the league lead in triples. He was also in the top three in hit by pitch in 1906 and 1907. In 1909, he batted 442 times, while only receiving two walks, which is the lowest single-season walk ratio recorded in the twentieth century, of players with 300 or more plate appearances.

Whitey maintained a home in his birth town of Etna his entire life, and also managed the Etna Elks baseball team.

Alperman died at the age of 63 in Pittsburgh, Pennsylvania, and was buried at the Mount Royal Cemetery in Glenshaw, Pennsylvania.

== See also ==
- List of Major League Baseball annual triples leaders
