= Bill Bergen =

American baseball player (1878–1943)

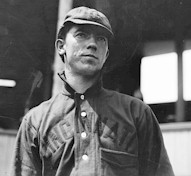
- Bergen in 1903 with Cincinnati Reds
- Catcher
- Born: June 13, 1878; North Brookfield, Massachusetts, U.S.
- Died: December 19, 1943 (aged 65); Worcester, Massachusetts, U.S.
- Batted: Right Threw: Right

MLB debut
- May 6, 1901, for the Cincinnati Reds

Last MLB appearance
- September 20, 1911, for the Brooklyn Dodgers

MLB statistics
- Batting average: .170
- Home runs: 2
- Runs batted in: 193
- Stats at Baseball Reference

Teams
- Cincinnati Reds (1901–1903); Brooklyn Superbas/Dodgers (1904–1911)

William Aloysius Bergen (June 13, 1878 – December 19, 1943) was an American professional baseball catcher. He played eleven seasons in Major League Baseball (MLB) from 1901 to 1911 for the Cincinnati Reds and Brooklyn Superbas/Dodgers. He was one of the worst-hitting position players in the history of the Major Leagues, but was also one of the best defensive catchers of all time. His −6.9 career WAR (according to Baseball Reference) is the second-worst among position players in MLB history.

== At the plate ==
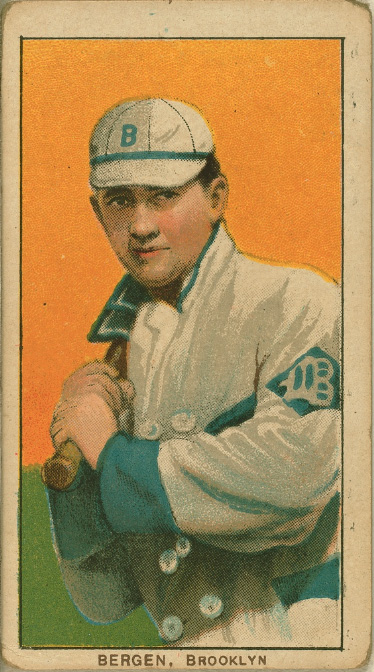
Bill Bergen baseball card, ca. 1909–1911, published by American Tobacco Company

Bergen was a fine defensive catcher whose dubious claim to fame was his offensive ineptitude. No one played in the major leagues as long as Bill Bergen and hit so poorly. Bergen had 3,028 career at-bats, during which he compiled a batting average of .170 (516/3028), a record low for players with more than 2,500 plate appearances. Pitchers are traditionally the weakest-hitting player in the lineup, yet three hurlers with more than 2,500 plate appearances accrued higher career batting averages than Bergen: Pud Galvin with .201, Bobby Mathews with .203, and Cy Young with .210. Among position players (non-pitchers), the next lowest career batting average is Billy Sullivan with .213 (a remarkable .043 differential). Bergen's career on-base percentage (OBP) was .194—he is the only player with at least 500 at-bats who tallied an OBP under .200. During five of his major league seasons, both his OBP and slugging percentage were under .200. He hit only two home runs in his career—and both were inside-the-park. In 1909, Bergen hit .139, the lowest average in history for a player with the minimum number of plate appearances to qualify for the batting title. From 1904 to 1911, Dodger pitchers as a group outhit Bergen, .169 to .162.

Per 150 games played (extended to an average MLB season), Bergen averaged only 11 extra-base hits and 15 walks. Throughout his 3,229 career plate appearances, Bergen was never hit by a pitch, a major league record that stood for over 85 years until broken by Mark Lemke in 1997.

In 1909, Bergen set another record for futility with a span of 45 consecutive at-bats without a base hit, which at the time was the longest streak ever by a position player (non-pitcher). The record stood for 102 years, and was broken in 2011 by Eugenio Vélez, who also played for the Dodgers. Baseball historian Craig Wright wrote, "Forgotten today is how close Bergen came to extending his record. He ended his streak with what was described as a 'lucky hit,' an infield hit he beat out after his grounder 'caromed off [pitcher Ed Reulbach]'s glove."

== Behind the plate ==
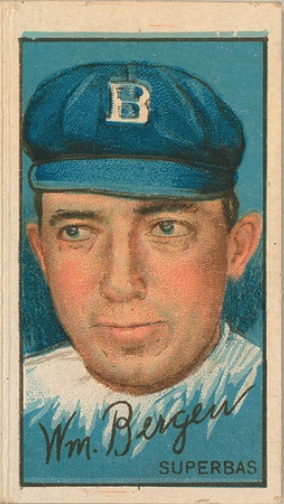
William Bergen, Brooklyn Superbas (Dodgers), baseball card portrait issued by American Tobacco Company, 1912

Despite his lack of batting skills, Bergen remained an active major leaguer for so long because he played in an era when pitching dominated and he was a first-rate defensive catcher. In 1908, The Sporting News called him one of the best catchers in the game. Charles Faber, in his book Baseball Ratings, called Bergen the third-best defensive catcher in history, behind Gabby Hartnett and Pop Snyder, and ahead of Johnny Edwards and Roy Campanella. Total Baseball ranks Bergen the fifth-best defensive catcher of all-time. By the measure of win shares, Bergen was the second best defensive catcher in the majors during his career, trailing only Ossee Schreckengost of the Philadelphia Athletics.

Bergen ranks ninth on the all-time list for assists by a catcher with 1,444, despite never being a full-time player. His .989 fielding percentage in 1908 set a record (since broken) for catchers. On August 23, 1909, he threw out six St. Louis Cardinals who attempted to steal bases, which tied the record. (Bergen's record was in question for years due to inconsistent contemporary reporting, but is now acknowledged to be six.) That year Bergen threw out 138 attempted steals in only 112 games behind the plate. His career percentage for throwing out base-stealers was 47.3%, as compared to a league average of 45% in that timeframe. He led the league in Caught Steals in 1906 and 1909.

Bergen tallied 100 assists as a catcher in nine seasons (in seven of which he caught less than 100 games), leading the league in 1904, 1906, and 1909. By comparison, the following Hall of Fame catchers reached 100 assists in a season the following number of times (despite in most cases playing far more games each season than Bergen): Johnny Bench (1); Yogi Berra (0); Mickey Cochrane (0); Ray Schalk (10); Roger Bresnahan (6); Roy Campanella (0); Gary Carter (4); Bill Dickey (4); Carlton Fisk (0); Gabby Hartnett (2); Ernie Lombardi (0); Rick Ferrell (0); and Buck Ewing (4).

Most of the teams for which Bergen played were not very good, which could partly explain his being retained on rosters year after year. The Dodgers had a losing record every year Bergen was on the team, including a dismal 48–104 record in 1905. (The 1903 Cincinnati Reds were the only team he played on that finished with a winning record.) After he was released from the big leagues, Bergen played in the minor leagues until 1914. He coached and managed in minor league ball until 1920, at which point he retired from the game.

== Personal life ==
Bergen died in Worcester, Massachusetts, on December 19, 1943, of heart disease. He is buried at St. John Cemetery, in Worcester.

His brother, Marty Bergen, was a big-league catcher for the Boston Beaneaters, and suffered from severe mental illness. Marty Bergen brutally murdered his family and committed suicide in 1900.

== See also ==
- Dead-ball era
- Batting average
- On-base percentage
- Mendoza Line
