= 1906 St. Louis Cardinals season =

Major League Baseball season

1906 St. Louis Cardinals
- League: National League
- Ballpark: League Park
- City: St. Louis, Missouri
- Record: 52–98 (.347)
- League place: 7th
- Owners: Frank Robison and Stanley Robison
- Managers: John McCloskey

The 1906 St. Louis Cardinals season was the team's 25th season in St. Louis, Missouri and the 15th season in the National League. The Cardinals went 52–98 during the season and finished seventh in the National League.

== Regular season ==
=== Season standings ===
National League
Team	W	L	Pct.	GB	Home	Road
Chicago Cubs	116	36	.763	—	56‍–‍21	60‍–‍15
New York Giants	96	56	.632	20	51‍–‍24	45‍–‍32
Pittsburgh Pirates	93	60	.608	23½	49‍–‍27	44‍–‍33
Philadelphia Phillies	71	82	.464	45½	37‍–‍40	34‍–‍42
Brooklyn Superbas	66	86	.434	50	31‍–‍44	35‍–‍42
Cincinnati Reds	64	87	.424	51½	36‍–‍40	28‍–‍47
St. Louis Cardinals	52	98	.347	63	28‍–‍48	24‍–‍50
Boston Beaneaters	49	102	.325	66½	28‍–‍47	21‍–‍55

=== Record vs. opponents ===
1906 National League record Sources:
Team	BSN	BRO	CHC	CIN	NYG	PHI	PIT	STL
Boston	—	9–13	5–17	11–10–1	6–15	6–16	3–19	9–12
Brooklyn	13–9	—	6–16	8–14	9–13	8–13	9–13	13–8–1
Chicago	17–5	16–6	—	18–4	15–7–1	19–3–1	16–5	15–6–1
Cincinnati	10–11–1	14–8	4–18	—	5–16	11–11	8–14–1	12–9–2
New York	15–6	13–9	7–15–1	16–5	—	15–7	11–11	19–3
Philadelphia	16–6	13–8	3–19–1	11–11	7–15	—	8–14	13–9
Pittsburgh	19–3	13–9	5–16	14–8–1	11–11	14–8	—	17–5
St. Louis	12–9	8–13–1	6–15–1	9–12–2	3–19	9–13	5–17	—

=== Notable transactions ===
- July 13, 1906: Spike Shannon was traded by the Cardinals to the New York Giants for Doc Marshall and Sam Mertes.

=== Roster ===
1906 St. Louis Cardinals
Roster
Pitchers: Babe Adams; Fred Beebe; Buster Brown; Carl Druhot; Wish Egan; Art Fromme; Irv Higginbotham; Ed Karger; Chappie McFarland; Stoney McGlynn; Ambrose Puttmann; Charlie Rhodes; Jack Taylor; Jake Thielman; Gus Thompson	Catchers: Mike Grady; Ducky Holmes; Doc Marshall; Joe McCarthy; Pete Noonan; Tommy Raub; Jack Slattery; Infielders: Harry Arndt; Jake Beckley; Pug Bennett; Forrest Crawford; Art Hoelskoetter; Ed Holly; George McBride; Bill Phyle; Eddie Zimmerman	Outfielders: Shad Barry; Al Burch; Rube DeGroff; Jack Himes; Joe Marshall; Sam Mertes; Red Murray; Tom O'Hara; Spike Shannon; Homer Smoot	Manager: John McCloskey

== Player stats ==
=== Batting ===
==== Starters by position ====
Note: Pos = Position; G = Games played; AB = At bats; H = Hits; Avg. = Batting average; HR = Home runs; RBI = Runs batted in

Pos	Player	G	AB	H	Avg.	HR	RBI
C	Mike Grady	97	280	70	.250	2	27
1B	Jake Beckley	87	320	79	.247	0	44
2B	Pug Bennett	153	595	156	.262	1	34
SS	George McBride	90	313	53	.169	0	13
3B	Harry Arndt	69	256	69	.270	2	26
OF	Al Burch	91	335	89	.266	0	11
OF	Homer Smoot	86	343	85	.248	0	31
OF	Spike Shannon	80	302	78	.258	0	25

==== Other batters ====
Note: G = Games played; AB = At bats; H = Hits; Avg. = Batting average; HR = Home runs; RBI = Runs batted in

Player	G	AB	H	Avg.	HR	RBI
Art Hoelskoetter	94	317	71	.224	0	14
Shad Barry	62	237	59	.249	0	12
Sam Mertes	53	191	47	.246	0	19
Jack Himes	40	155	42	.271	0	14
Forrest Crawford	45	145	30	.207	0	11
Red Murray	46	144	37	.257	1	16
Pete Noonan	44	125	21	.168	1	9
Doc Marshall	39	123	34	.276	0	10
Joe Marshall	33	95	15	.158	0	7
Tommy Raub	24	78	22	.282	0	2
Bill Phyle	22	73	13	.178	0	4
Tom O'Hara	14	53	16	.302	0	0
Joe McCarthy	15	37	9	.243	0	2
Ed Holly	10	34	2	.059	0	7
Ducky Holmes	9	27	5	.185	0	2
Eddie Zimmerman	5	14	3	.214	0	1
Jack Slattery	3	7	2	.286	0	0
Rube DeGroff	1	4	0	.000	0	0

=== Pitching ===
==== Starting pitchers ====
Note: G = Games pitched; IP = Innings pitched; W = Wins; L = Losses; ERA = Earned run average; SO = Strikeouts

Player	G	IP	W	L	ERA	SO
Buster Brown	32	238.1	8	16	2.64	109
Ed Karger	25	191.2	5	16	2.72	73
Fred Beebe	20	160.2	9	9	3.02	116
Jack Taylor	17	155.0	8	9	2.15	27
Carl Druhot	15	130.1	6	7	2.42	45
Gus Thompson	17	103.0	2	11	4.28	36
Wish Egan	16	86.1	2	9	4.59	23
Stoney McGlynn	6	48.0	2	2	2.44	25
Irv Higginbotham	7	47.1	1	4	3.23	14
Art Fromme	3	25.0	1	2	1.44	11
Ambrose Puttmann	4	18.2	2	2	5.30	12
Jake Thielman	1	5.0	0	1	3.60	0
Babe Adams	1	4.0	0	1	13.50	0

==== Other pitchers ====
Note: G = Games pitched; IP = Innings pitched; W = Wins; L = Losses; ERA = Earned run average; SO = Strikeouts

Player	G	IP	W	L	ERA	SO
Art Hoelskoetter	12	58.1	1	4	4.63	20
Charlie Rhodes	9	45.0	3	4	3.40	32
Chappie McFarland	6	37.1	2	1	1.93	16
