= 1906 Cincinnati Reds season =

1906 Cincinnati Reds
- League: National League
- Ballpark: Palace of the Fans
- City: Cincinnati, Ohio
- Owners: Garry Herrmann
- Managers: Ned Hanlon

The 1906 Cincinnati Reds season was a season in American baseball. The team finished sixth in the National League with a record of 64–87, 51½ games behind the Chicago Cubs.

== Regular season ==
The Reds were coming off their fourth consecutive winning season in 1905, as they had a 79–74 record, however, the team finished in fifth place, twenty-six games behind the pennant winning New York Giants.

Cincinnati made a number of moves in the off-season, including replacing Joe Kelley as manager with Ned Hanlon. Kelley would remain with the Reds as an outfielder. Hanlon had previously managed the Brooklyn Superbas from 1899 to 1905, leading them to the National League pennant in 1899 and 1900. Hanlon also managed the Baltimore Orioles from 1892 to 1898, leading them to three straight NL pennants from 1894 to 1896.

The Reds traded away third baseman Harry Steinfeldt to the Chicago Cubs for pitcher Jake Weimer. Weimer had a record of 18–12 with a 2.26 ERA in 33 games with the Cubs in 1905 after recording two straight twenty win seasons in 1903 and 1904. The team also traded away infielder Al Bridwell to the Boston Beaneaters for third baseman Jim Delahanty and pitcher Chick Fraser. Delahanty hit .255 with five homers and 55 RBI with Boston in 1905, while Fraser had a 14–21 record with a 3.28 ERA in his only season with the Beaneaters.

The team had a poor start to the season, as Cincinnati had a 10–20 record after thirty games, sitting in seventh place, 11.5 games behind the Chicago Cubs. A six-game winning streak brought the Reds up to fifth place, however, a 2–11 skid in their next thirteen games dropped Cincinnati back to seventh place, 15.5 games behind the Cubs. As Cincinnati was dropping out of the pennant race, the team made some trades, dealing pitcher Orval Overall to the Cubs for pitcher Bob Wicker and $2,000, trading outfielder Cy Seymour to the Giants for $12,000, and trading away infielder Shad Barry and pitcher Carl Druhot for outfielder Homer Smoot. Cincinnati finished the season with a 64–87 record, their first losing season since 1901, finishing 51.5 games behind first place Chicago.

Miller Huggins had another solid season at second base, leading the team with a .292 batting average, 159 hits and 81 runs. Catcher Admiral Schlei had a break out season, hitting .245 with a team high four homers and 54 RBI.

On the mound, Jake Weimer anchored the staff, going 20–14 with a 2.22 ERA in 41 games, starting 39 of them. Bob Ewing went 13–14 with a 2.38 ERA in 33 games, striking out a team high 145 batters.

=== Season standings ===
National League
Team	W	L	Pct.	GB	Home	Road
Chicago Cubs	116	36	.763	—	56‍–‍21	60‍–‍15
New York Giants	96	56	.632	20	51‍–‍24	45‍–‍32
Pittsburgh Pirates	93	60	.608	23½	49‍–‍27	44‍–‍33
Philadelphia Phillies	71	82	.464	45½	37‍–‍40	34‍–‍42
Brooklyn Superbas	66	86	.434	50	31‍–‍44	35‍–‍42
Cincinnati Reds	64	87	.424	51½	36‍–‍40	28‍–‍47
St. Louis Cardinals	52	98	.347	63	28‍–‍48	24‍–‍50
Boston Beaneaters	49	102	.325	66½	28‍–‍47	21‍–‍55

=== Record vs. opponents ===
1906 National League record Sources:
Team	BSN	BRO	CHC	CIN	NYG	PHI	PIT	STL
Boston	—	9–13	5–17	11–10–1	6–15	6–16	3–19	9–12
Brooklyn	13–9	—	6–16	8–14	9–13	8–13	9–13	13–8–1
Chicago	17–5	16–6	—	18–4	15–7–1	19–3–1	16–5	15–6–1
Cincinnati	10–11–1	14–8	4–18	—	5–16	11–11	8–14–1	12–9–2
New York	15–6	13–9	7–15–1	16–5	—	15–7	11–11	19–3
Philadelphia	16–6	13–8	3–19–1	11–11	7–15	—	8–14	13–9
Pittsburgh	19–3	13–9	5–16	14–8–1	11–11	14–8	—	17–5
St. Louis	12–9	8–13–1	6–15–1	9–12–2	3–19	9–13	5–17	—

=== Roster ===
1906 Cincinnati Reds
Roster
Pitchers: Charlie Chech; Gus Dorner; Carl Druhot; Bill Essick; Bob Ewing; Chick Fraser; Leo Hafford; Charley Hall; Jack Harper; Del Mason; Orval Overall; Jake Weimer; Bob Wicker	Catchers: Paddy Livingston; Larry McLean; Ed Phelps; Admiral Schlei; Oscar Stanage; Infielders: Shad Barry; Charlie Carr; Tommy Corcoran; Snake Deal; Jim Delahanty; Miller Huggins; Hans Lobert; Mike Mowrey; Eddie Tiemeyer	Outfielders: Jimmy Barrett; Bill Hinchman; Frank Jude; Joe Kelley; Fred Odwell; Cy Seymour; Johnny Siegle; Homer Smoot	Manager: Ned Hanlon

== Player stats ==
=== Batting ===
==== Starters by position ====
Note: Pos = Position; G = Games played; AB = At bats; H = Hits; Avg. = Batting average; HR = Home runs; RBI = Runs batted in

Pos	Player	G	AB	H	Avg.	HR	RBI
C	Admiral Schlei	116	388	95	.245	4	54
1B	Snake Deal	65	231	48	.208	0	21
2B	Miller Huggins	146	545	159	.292	0	26
SS	Tommy Corcoran	117	430	89	.207	1	33
3B	Jim Delahanty	115	379	106	.280	1	39
OF	Cy Seymour	79	307	79	.257	4	38
OF	Frank Jude	80	308	64	.208	1	31
OF	Joe Kelley	129	465	106	.228	1	53

==== Other batters ====
Note: G = Games played; AB = At bats; H = Hits; Avg. = Batting average; HR = Home runs; RBI = Runs batted in

Player	G	AB	H	Avg.	HR	RBI
Shad Barry	73	279	80	.287	1	33
Hans Lobert	79	268	83	.310	0	19
Homer Smoot	60	220	57	.259	1	17
Fred Odwell	58	202	45	.223	0	21
Paddy Livingston	50	139	22	.158	0	8
Charlie Carr	22	94	18	.191	0	10
Johnny Siegle	21	68	8	.118	0	7
Bill Hinchman	18	54	11	.204	0	1
Mike Mowrey	21	53	17	.321	0	6
Ed Phelps	12	40	11	.275	1	5
Larry McLean	12	35	7	.200	0	2
Jimmy Barrett	5	12	0	.000	0	0
Eddie Tiemeyer	5	11	2	.182	0	0
Oscar Stanage	1	1	0	.000	0	0

=== Pitching ===
==== Starting pitchers ====
Note: G = Games pitched; IP = Innings pitched; W = Wins; L = Losses; ERA = Earned run average; SO = Strikeouts

Player	G	IP	W	L	ERA	SO
Jake Weimer	41	304.2	20	14	2.22	141
Bob Ewing	33	287.2	13	14	2.38	145
Chick Fraser	31	236.0	10	20	2.67	58
Bob Wicker	20	150.0	6	11	2.70	69
Orval Overall	13	82.1	4	5	4.26	33
Jack Harper	5	36.2	1	4	4.17	10
Carl Druhot	4	25.0	2	2	4.32	14

==== Other pitchers ====
Note: G = Games pitched; IP = Innings pitched; W = Wins; L = Losses; ERA = Earned run average; SO = Strikeouts

Player	G	IP	W	L	ERA	SO
Charley Hall	14	95.0	4	8	3.32	49
Charlie Chech	11	66.0	1	4	2.32	17
Bill Essick	6	39.1	2	2	2.97	16
Leo Hafford	3	19.0	1	1	0.95	5
Gus Dorner	2	15.0	0	1	1.20	5
Del Mason	2	12.0	0	1	4.50	4

==== Relief pitchers ====
Note: G = Games pitched; W = Wins; L = Losses; SV = Saves; ERA = Earned run average; SO = Strikeouts

Player	G	W	L	SV	ERA	SO
Eddie Tiemeyer	1	0	0	0	0.00	1
