= 1906 Chicago Cubs season =

1906 Chicago Cubs
- National League champions
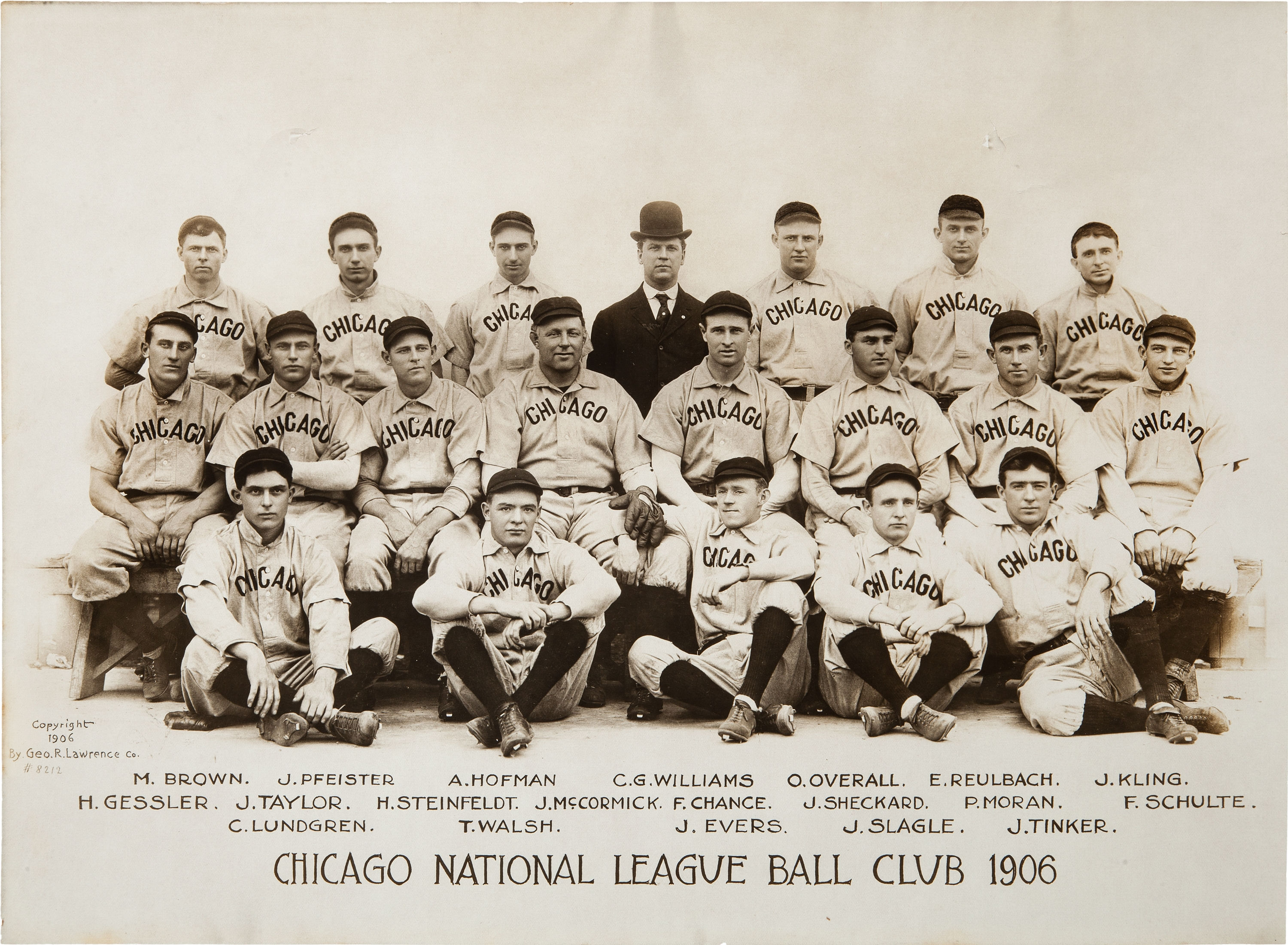
- League: National League
- Ballpark: West Side Park
- City: Chicago, Illinois
- Record: 116–36 (.763)
- League place: 1st
- Owners: Charles Murphy
- Managers: Frank Chance

The 1906 Chicago Cubs season was the 35th season of the Chicago Cubs franchise, the 31st in the National League and the 14th at West Side Park. Skippered by player-manager Frank Chance, the Cubs won the National League pennant with a record of 116–36, a full 20 games ahead of the second-place New York Giants. The team's .763 winning percentage, with two ties in their 154-game season, is the highest in modern MLB history. The 2001 Seattle Mariners also won 116 games, but they did that in 162 games, resulting in a .716 winning percentage.

The 1906 Cubs are often considered the greatest MLB team to not win the World Series. In a major upset, the Cubs were beaten by their crosstown counterparts Chicago White Sox in that year's World Series.

== Regular season ==
Led by new manager Frank Chance, the Cubs dominated the NL. They led the league in both runs scored and fewest runs allowed by large margins. Their record of 116 wins has never been beaten, although it was tied by the 2001 Seattle Mariners (who played a longer 162-game season).

The team included four future Hall of Famers: manager and first baseman Chance, second baseman Johnny Evers, shortstop Joe Tinker, and pitcher Mordecai Brown. Brown finished second in the NL in wins to Joe McGinnity, but his 1.04 ERA set a major league record. Although the record was broken by Dutch Leonard in 1914, Brown's mark still stands as the National League record.

The pitching staff led the majors with a team earned run average of 1.75. Six members of the pitching staff had double digit victories – Mordecai Brown (26), Jack Pfiester (20), Ed Reulbach (19), Carl Lundgren (17), Orval Overall (12), and Jack Taylor (12). In addition, Mordecai Brown set a major league record with the lowest earned run average attained with at least 250 innings pitched (1.04). The offensive star was third baseman Harry Steinfeldt, who led the NL in both hits and RBI.

The team's .763 winning percentage also set a modern-era record, and was the best overall since 1885. However, it set neither a National League record nor even a franchise record, as the 19th-century White Stockings finished with better records on three occasions (1876, 1880, and 1885). The all-time major league record belongs to the 1884 St. Louis Maroons of the Union Association at .832.

On August 9, Jack Taylor threw the last of a major league record 187 consecutive complete games that he pitched (not counting appearances as a relief pitcher), a streak that began in 1901 when Taylor was pitching for the Chicago Orphans. Taylor had been re-acquired from the St. Louis Cardinals on July 1, having been traded to the Cards after the 1903 season.

=== Season standings ===
National League
Team	W	L	Pct.	GB	Home	Road
Chicago Cubs	116	36	.763	—	56‍–‍21	60‍–‍15
New York Giants	96	56	.632	20	51‍–‍24	45‍–‍32
Pittsburgh Pirates	93	60	.608	23½	49‍–‍27	44‍–‍33
Philadelphia Phillies	71	82	.464	45½	37‍–‍40	34‍–‍42
Brooklyn Superbas	66	86	.434	50	31‍–‍44	35‍–‍42
Cincinnati Reds	64	87	.424	51½	36‍–‍40	28‍–‍47
St. Louis Cardinals	52	98	.347	63	28‍–‍48	24‍–‍50
Boston Beaneaters	49	102	.325	66½	28‍–‍47	21‍–‍55

=== Record vs. opponents ===
1906 National League record Sources:
Team	BSN	BRO	CHC	CIN	NYG	PHI	PIT	STL
Boston	—	9–13	5–17	11–10–1	6–15	6–16	3–19	9–12
Brooklyn	13–9	—	6–16	8–14	9–13	8–13	9–13	13–8–1
Chicago	17–5	16–6	—	18–4	15–7–1	19–3–1	16–5	15–6–1
Cincinnati	10–11–1	14–8	4–18	—	5–16	11–11	8–14–1	12–9–2
New York	15–6	13–9	7–15–1	16–5	—	15–7	11–11	19–3
Philadelphia	16–6	13–8	3–19–1	11–11	7–15	—	8–14	13–9
Pittsburgh	19–3	13–9	5–16	14–8–1	11–11	14–8	—	17–5
St. Louis	12–9	8–13–1	6–15–1	9–12–2	3–19	9–13	5–17	—

=== Roster ===
1906 Chicago Cubs
Roster
Pitchers: Fred Beebe; Mordecai Brown; Jack Harper; Carl Lundgren; Orval Overall; Jack Pfiester; Ed Reulbach; Jack Taylor; Bob Wicker	Catchers: Johnny Kling; Pat Moran; Tom Walsh; Infielders: Frank Chance; Johnny Evers; Pete Noonan; Harry Steinfeldt; Joe Tinker	Outfielders: Doc Gessler; Solly Hofman; Wildfire Schulte; Jimmy Sheckard; Jimmy Slagle; Other batters: Bull Smith	Manager: Frank Chance

== Player stats ==
= Indicates team leader

=== Batting ===
==== Starters by position ====
Note: Pos = Position; G = Games played; AB = At bats; H = Hits; Avg. = Batting average; HR = Home runs; RBI = Runs batted in

Pos	Player	G	AB	H	Avg.	HR	RBI
C	Johnny Kling	107	343	107	.312	2	46
1B	Frank Chance	136	474	151	.319	3	71
2B	Johnny Evers	154	533	136	.255	1	51
SS	Joe Tinker	148	523	122	.233	1	64
3B	Harry Steinfeldt	151	539	176	.327	3	83
OF	Jimmy Sheckard	149	549	144	.262	1	45
OF	Frank Schulte	146	563	158	.281	7	60
OF	Jimmy Slagle	127	498	119	.239	0	33

==== Other batters ====
Note: G = Games played; AB = At bats; H = Hits; Avg. = Batting average; HR = Home runs; RBI = Runs batted in

Player	G	AB	H	Avg.	HR	RBI
Pat Moran	70	226	57	.252	0	35
Solly Hofman	64	195	50	.256	2	20
Doc Gessler	34	83	21	.253	0	10
Pete Noonan	5	3	1	.333	0	0
Tom Walsh	2	1	0	.000	0	0
Bull Smith	1	1	0	.000	0	0

=== Pitching ===
==== Starting pitchers ====
Note: G = Games pitched; IP = Innings pitched; W = Wins; L = Losses; ERA = Earned run average; SO = Strikeouts

Player	G	IP	W	L	ERA	SO
Mordecai Brown	36	277.1	26	6	1.04	144
Jack Pfiester	31	250.2	20	8	1.51	153
Ed Reulbach	33	218.0	19	4	1.65	94
Carl Lundgren	27	207.2	17	6	2.21	103
Jack Taylor	17	147.1	12	3	1.83	34
Orval Overall	18	144.0	12	3	1.88	94
Bob Wicker	10	72.1	3	5	2.99	25
Jack Harper	1	1.0	0	0	0.00	0

==== Other pitchers ====
Note: G = Games pitched; IP = Innings pitched; W = Wins; L = Losses; ERA = Earned run average; SO = Strikeouts

Player	G	IP	W	L	ERA	SO
Fred Beebe	14	70.0	6	1	2.70	55

== 1906 World Series ==
AL Chicago White Sox (4) vs NL Chicago Cubs (2)

Game	Score	Date	Location	Attendance
1	White Sox – 2, Cubs – 1	October 9	West Side Park	12,693
2	Cubs – 7, White Sox – 1	October 10	South Side Park	12,595
3	White Sox – 3, Cubs – 0	October 11	West Side Park	13,667
4	Cubs – 1, White Sox – 0	October 12	South Side Park	18,385
5	White Sox – 8, Cubs – 6	October 13	West Side Park	23,257
6	Cubs – 3, White Sox – 8	October 14	South Side Park	19,249

== Awards and honors ==
- Highest team winning percentage in one season in the modern era (.763)
- Chicago Cubs pitching staff led the majors with a team earned run average of 1.76.
- Mordecai Brown, major league record, lowest earned run average with at least 250 innings pitched (1.04)
