= 1907 New York Giants season =

1907 New York Giants
- League: National League
- Ballpark: Polo Grounds
- City: New York City
- Record: 82–71 (.536)
- League place: 4th
- Owners: John T. Brush
- Managers: John McGraw

The 1907 New York Giants season was the franchise's 25th season. The team finished in fourth place in the National League with an 82–71 record, 25½ games behind the Chicago Cubs.

== Regular season ==
=== Season standings ===
National League
Team	W	L	Pct.	GB	Home	Road
Chicago Cubs	107	45	.704	—	54‍–‍19	53‍–‍26
Pittsburgh Pirates	91	63	.591	17	47‍–‍29	44‍–‍34
Philadelphia Phillies	83	64	.565	21½	45‍–‍30	38‍–‍34
New York Giants	82	71	.536	25½	45‍–‍30	37‍–‍41
Brooklyn Superbas	65	83	.439	40	37‍–‍38	28‍–‍45
Cincinnati Reds	66	87	.431	41½	43‍–‍36	23‍–‍51
Boston Doves	58	90	.392	47	31‍–‍42	27‍–‍48
St. Louis Cardinals	52	101	.340	55½	31‍–‍47	21‍–‍54

=== Record vs. opponents ===
1907 National League record Sources:
Team	BSN	BRO	CHC	CIN	NYG	PHI	PIT	STL
Boston	—	12–7–2	5–17	9–13	9–13	8–11–1	9–13–1	6–16
Brooklyn	7–12–2	—	5–15–1	15–7–1	10–12–1	8–13	6–16	14–8
Chicago	17–5	15–5–1	—	17–5	16–6	14–8	12–10–1	16–6–1
Cincinnati	13–9	7–15–1	5–17	—	9–13–1	8–13	10–12–1	14–8
New York	13–9	12–10–1	6–16	13–9–1	—	11–10	10–12	17–5
Philadelphia	11–8–1	13–8	8–14	13–8	10–11	—	14–8	14–7–1
Pittsburgh	13–9–1	16–6	10–12–1	12–10–1	12–10	8–14	—	20–2
St. Louis	16–6	8–14	6–16–1	8–14	5–17	7–14–1	2–20	—

=== Roster ===
1907 New York Giants
Roster
Pitchers: Red Ames; Roy Beecher; George Ferguson; Mike Lynch; Christy Mathewson; Henry Mathewson; Joe McGinnity; Dummy Taylor; Hooks Wiltse	Catchers: Frank Bowerman; Roger Bresnahan; Harry Curtis; Matty Fitzgerald; Infielders: Tommy Corcoran; Bill Dahlen; Art Devlin; Larry Doyle; Jack Hannifin; Dan McGann; Fred Merkle; Monte Pfyl; Danny Shay	Outfielders: George Browne; Cy Seymour; Spike Shannon; Sammy Strang; Ham Wade	Manager: John McGraw

== Player stats ==
=== Batting ===
==== Starters by position ====
Note: Pos = Position; G = Games played; AB = At bats; H = Hits; Avg. = Batting average; HR = Home runs; RBI = Runs batted in

Pos	Player	G	AB	H	Avg.	HR	RBI
C	Roger Bresnahan	110	328	83	.253	4	38
1B	Dan McGann	81	262	78	.298	2	36
2B	Larry Doyle	69	227	59	.260	0	16
3B	Art Devlin	143	491	136	.277	1	54
SS	Bill Dahlen	143	464	96	.207	0	34
OF	Cy Seymour	131	473	139	.294	3	75
OF	George Browne	127	458	119	.260	5	37
OF	Spike Shannon	155	585	155	.265	1	33

==== Other batters ====
Note: G = Games played; AB = At bats; H = Hits; Avg. = Batting average; HR = Home runs; RBI = Runs batted in

Player	G	AB	H	Avg.	HR	RBI
Frank Bowerman	96	311	81	.260	0	32
Sammy Strang	123	306	77	.252	4	30
Tommy Corcoran	62	226	60	.265	0	24
Jack Hannifin	56	149	34	.228	1	15
Danny Shay	35	79	15	.190	1	6
Fred Merkle	15	47	12	.255	0	5
Matty Fitzgerald	7	15	2	.133	0	1
Harry Curtis	6	9	2	.222	0	1
Monte Pfyl	1	0	0	----	0	0
Ham Wade	1	0	0	----	0	0
John McGraw	1	0	0	----	0	0

=== Pitching ===
==== Starting pitchers ====
Note: G = Games pitched; IP = Innings pitched; W = Wins; L = Losses; ERA = Earned run average; SO = Strikeouts

Player	G	IP	W	L	ERA	SO
Christy Mathewson	41	315.0	24	12	2.00	178
Joe McGinnity	47	310.1	18	18	3.16	120
Red Ames	39	233.1	10	12	2.16	146
Dummy Taylor	28	171.0	11	7	2.42	56
Mike Lynch	12	72.0	3	6	3.38	34
Roy Beecher	2	14.0	0	2	2.57	5

==== Other pitchers ====
Note: G = Games pitched; IP = Innings pitched; W = Wins; L = Losses; ERA = Earned run average; SO = Strikeouts

Player	G	IP	W	L	ERA	SO
Hooks Wiltse	33	190.1	13	12	2.18	79
George Ferguson	15	64.0	3	2	2.11	37

==== Relief pitchers ====
Note: G = Games pitched; W = Wins; L = Losses; SV = Saves; ERA = Earned run average; SO = Strikeouts

Player	G	W	L	SV	ERA	SO
Henry Mathewson	1	0	0	1	0.00	0

== Awards and honors ==
=== League top five finishers ===
- Red Ames: #3 strikeouts (146)
- Art Devlin: #5 stolen bases (38)
- Christy Mathewson: #1 wins (24)
- Christy Mathewson: #1 strikeouts (178)
- Christy Mathewson: #1 shutouts (8)
- Spike Shannon: #1 runs scored (104)
- Sammy Strang: #4 on-base percentage (.388)
