= List of Major League Baseball career FIP leaders =

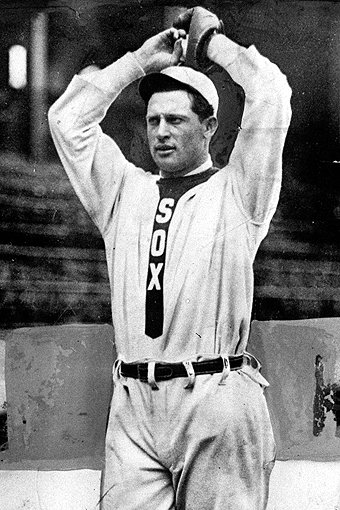
Ed Walsh, the career leader in fielding independent pitching.

In baseball statistics, fielding independent pitching (FIP) is the measure of a pitcher's effectiveness based only on statistics that do not involve fielders (except the catcher). These include home runs allowed, strikeouts, hit batters, walks, and, more recently, fly ball percentage, ground ball percentage, and (to a much lesser extent) line drive percentage. It is considered to be a more accurate reflection of a pitcher's performance than earned run average.

This is a list of the top 100 leaders in career FIP, who have thrown at least 1,000 innings.

Hall of Fame pitcher Ed Walsh holds the major league record for lowest career FIP, with 2.018.

== Key ==
**Rank**	Rank amongst leaders in career earned run average. A blank field indicates a tie.
**Player**	Name of player.
**FIP**	Total career fielding independent pitching.
*	Denotes elected to National Baseball Hall of Fame.
**Bold**	Denotes an active player. (Note: A player is considered inactive if he has announced his retirement or not played for a full season.)

== List ==
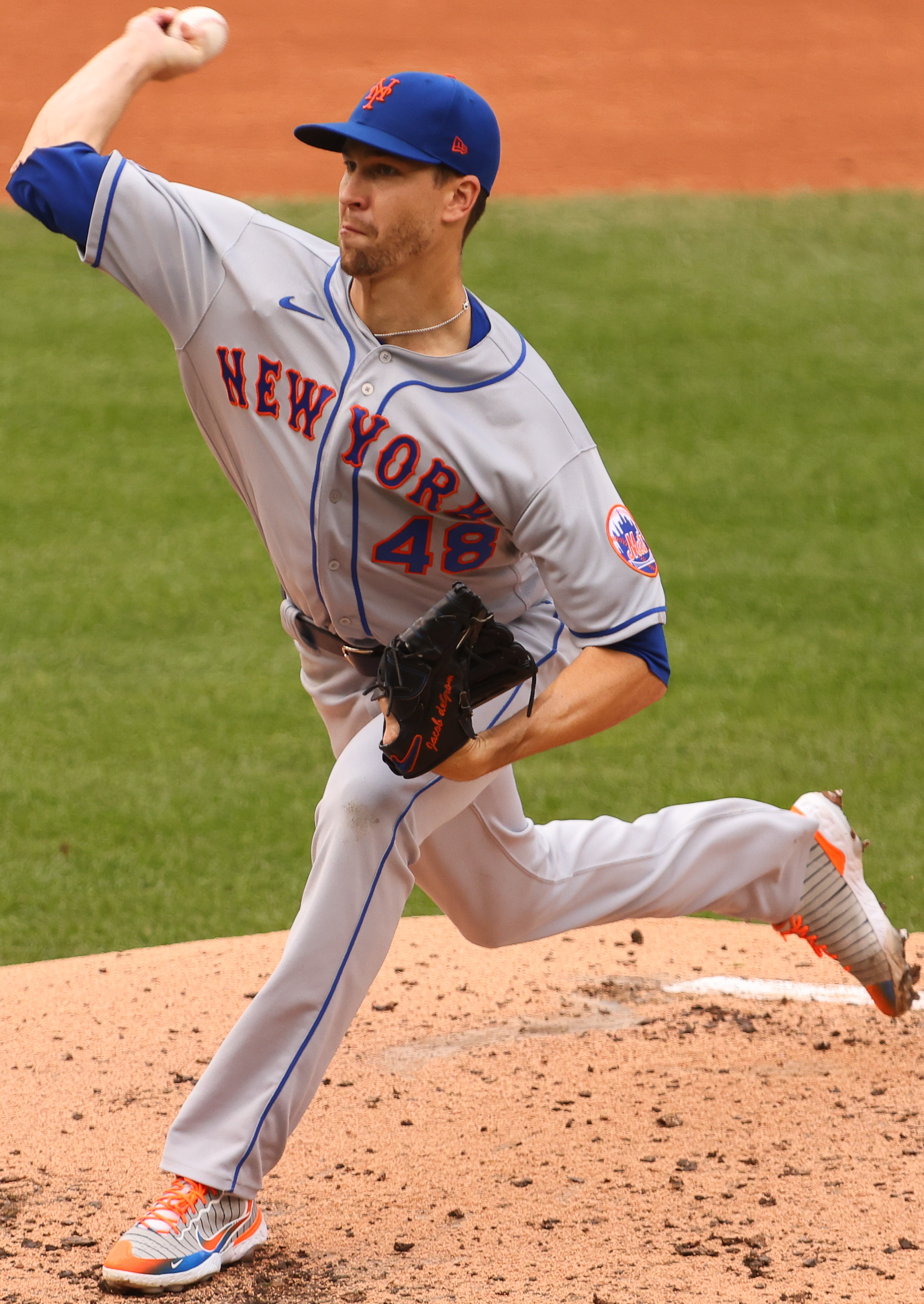
Jacob deGrom, the active leader in career FIP and tied for 57th all-time.

- Stats updated as of September 25, 2026.

Rank	Player	FIP
1	Ed Walsh*	2.018
2	Rube Waddell*	2.033
3	Satchel Paige*	2.188
4	Addie Joss*	2.188
5	Smoky Joe Wood	2.256
6	Christy Mathewson*	2.263
7	Chief Bender*	2.294
8	Jack Pfiester	2.322
9	Jim Devlin	2.325
10	Tommy Bond	2.337
11	Reb Russell	2.357
12	Walter Johnson*	2.377
13	Orval Overall	2.385
14	Mordecai Brown*	2.414
15	John Montgomery Ward*	2.427
16	Fred Glade	2.445
17	Eddie Plank*	2.448
18	Cy Falkenberg	2.492
19	Dick Rudolph	2.509
20	Doc White	2.511
21	Terry Larkin	2.517
22	Frank Smith	2.524
23	Joe Lake	2.530
24	Irv Young	2.536
25	Red Ames	2.537
26	Ray Collins	2.539
27	Eddie Cicotte	2.543
28	Bob Ewing	2.553
29	Nick Altrock	2.556
30	Charlie Smith	2.558
31	Hooks Wiltse	2.559
32	Andy Coakley	2.583
33	George McQuillan	2.584
34	George Bradley	2.592
35	Deacon Phillippe	2.595
36	Nap Rucker	2.597
37	Hippo Vaughn	2.626
38	Jim Scott	2.628
39	Joe Benz	2.634
40	Ed Karger	2.646
41	George Bell	2.649
42	Noodles Hahn	2.654
43	Candy Cummings*	2.661
44	Doc Ayers	2.670
45	Jack Chesbro*	2.674
46	Frank Corridon	2.684
47	Sandy Koufax*	2.687
48	Dave Davenport	2.700
49	Harry Coveleski	2.702
	Bobby Mathews	2.702

Rank	Player	FIP
51	Frank Owen	2.704
	Al Spalding	2.704
53	Willie Mitchell	2.710
54	Bob Wicker	2.712
55	Lee Richmond	2.725
56	Cherokee Fisher	2.729
57	**Jacob deGrom**	2.746
	Jim Whitney	2.746
59	Babe Adams	2.747
60	Al Demaree	2.749
	Claude Hendrix	2.749
62	Sam Weaver	2.752
62	Bob Veale	2.759
64	Mariano Rivera*	2.764
65	Bill Donovan	2.766
66	Nick Cullop	2.770
67	Harry Howell	2.787
68	Johnny Lush	2.791
69	Jeff Tesreau	2.792
70	Gene Packard	2.794
71	Fred Beebe	2.801
	Ed Killian	2.801
73	Babe Ruth*	2.806
74	Jake Weimer	2.814
75	George Winter	2.816
76	Ed Siever	2.819
77	Bob Groom	2.826
78	Barney Pelty	2.827
79	**Chris Sale**	2.837
80	Russ Ford	2.838
81	Sam Leever	2.840
82	George Zettlein	2.842
83	Dutch Leonard	2.843
84	Ed Reulbach	2.844
	Cy Young*	2.844
86	Tom Hughes	2.845
87	Toad Ramsey	2.853
88	Clayton Kershaw	2.855
	Pat Ragan	2.855
90	Howie Camnitz	2.857
	J. R. Richard	2.857
92	Carl Weilman	2.860
93	Jesse Tannehill	2.863
94	Slim Sallee	2.871
95	Jim McCormick	2.875
96	Bill Bernhard	2.877
	Bob Rhoads	2.877
98	Ray Fisher	2.882
99	Bob Gibson*	2.881
100	Roy Patterson	2.895
