= 1906 New York Giants season =

1906 New York Giants
- League: National League
- Ballpark: Polo Grounds
- City: New York City
- Record: 96–56 (.632)
- League place: 2nd
- Owners: John T. Brush
- Managers: John McGraw

The 1906 New York Giants season was the franchise's 24th season. The team finished in second place in the National League with a 96–56 record, 20 games behind the Chicago Cubs.

== Regular season ==
=== Season standings ===
National League
| Team | W | L | Pct. | GB | Home | Road |
|---|---|---|---|---|---|---|
| Chicago Cubs | 116 | 36 | .763 | — | 56‍–‍21 | 60‍–‍15 |
| New York Giants | 96 | 56 | .632 | 20 | 51‍–‍24 | 45‍–‍32 |
| Pittsburgh Pirates | 93 | 60 | .608 | 23½ | 49‍–‍27 | 44‍–‍33 |
| Philadelphia Phillies | 71 | 82 | .464 | 45½ | 37‍–‍40 | 34‍–‍42 |
| Brooklyn Superbas | 66 | 86 | .434 | 50 | 31‍–‍44 | 35‍–‍42 |
| Cincinnati Reds | 64 | 87 | .424 | 51½ | 36‍–‍40 | 28‍–‍47 |
| St. Louis Cardinals | 52 | 98 | .347 | 63 | 28‍–‍48 | 24‍–‍50 |
| Boston Beaneaters | 49 | 102 | .325 | 66½ | 28‍–‍47 | 21‍–‍55 |

=== Record vs. opponents ===
1906 National League record Sources:
| Team | BSN | BRO | CHC | CIN | NYG | PHI | PIT | STL |
|---|---|---|---|---|---|---|---|---|
| Boston | — | 9–13 | 5–17 | 11–10–1 | 6–15 | 6–16 | 3–19 | 9–12 |
| Brooklyn | 13–9 | — | 6–16 | 8–14 | 9–13 | 8–13 | 9–13 | 13–8–1 |
| Chicago | 17–5 | 16–6 | — | 18–4 | 15–7–1 | 19–3–1 | 16–5 | 15–6–1 |
| Cincinnati | 10–11–1 | 14–8 | 4–18 | — | 5–16 | 11–11 | 8–14–1 | 12–9–2 |
| New York | 15–6 | 13–9 | 7–15–1 | 16–5 | — | 15–7 | 11–11 | 19–3 |
| Philadelphia | 16–6 | 13–8 | 3–19–1 | 11–11 | 7–15 | — | 8–14 | 13–9 |
| Pittsburgh | 19–3 | 13–9 | 5–16 | 14–8–1 | 11–11 | 14–8 | — | 17–5 |
| St. Louis | 12–9 | 8–13–1 | 6–15–1 | 9–12–2 | 3–19 | 9–13 | 5–17 | — |

=== Notable transactions ===
- July 13, 1906: Doc Marshall and Sam Mertes were traded by the Giants to the St. Louis Cardinals for Spike Shannon.

=== Roster ===
1906 New York Giants
Roster
| Pitchers: Red Ames; Cecil Ferguson; Christy Mathewson; Henry Mathewson; Joe McGinnity; Dummy Taylor; Hooks Wiltse; Catchers: Frank Bowerman; Roger Bresnahan; Matty Fitzgerald; Aleck Smith | Infielders: Bill Dahlen; Art Devlin; Billy Gilbert; Jack Hannifin; Dan McGann; John McGraw; Sammy Strang | Outfielders: George Browne; Frank Burke; Mike Donlin; Doc Marshall; Sam Mertes; Cy Seymour; Spike Shannon | Manager: John McGraw |

== Player stats ==
=== Batting ===
==== Starters by position ====
Note: Pos = Position; G = Games played; AB = At bats; H = Hits; Avg. = Batting average; HR = Home runs; RBI = Runs batted in

| Pos | Player | G | AB | H | Avg. | HR | RBI |
|---|---|---|---|---|---|---|---|
| C | Roger Bresnahan | 124 | 405 | 114 | .281 | 0 | 43 |
| 1B | Dan McGann | 134 | 451 | 107 | .237 | 0 | 37 |
| 2B | Billy Gilbert | 104 | 307 | 71 | .231 | 0 | 27 |
| SS | Bill Dahlen | 143 | 471 | 113 | .240 | 1 | 49 |
| 3B | Art Devlin | 148 | 498 | 149 | .299 | 2 | 65 |
| OF | George Browne | 122 | 477 | 126 | .264 | 0 | 38 |
| OF | Spike Shannon | 76 | 287 | 73 | .254 | 0 | 25 |
| OF | Sam Mertes | 71 | 253 | 60 | .237 | 1 | 33 |

==== Other batters ====
Note: G = Games played; AB = At bats; H = Hits; Avg. = Batting average; HR = Home runs; RBI = Runs batted in

| Player | G | AB | H | Avg. | HR | RBI |
|---|---|---|---|---|---|---|
| Sammy Strang | 113 | 313 | 100 | .319 | 4 | 49 |
| Frank Bowerman | 92 | 285 | 65 | .228 | 1 | 42 |
| Cy Seymour | 72 | 269 | 86 | .320 | 4 | 42 |
| Mike Donlin | 37 | 121 | 38 | .314 | 1 | 14 |
| Doc Marshall | 38 | 102 | 17 | .167 | 0 | 7 |
| Jack Hannifin | 10 | 30 | 6 | .200 | 0 | 3 |
| Aleck Smith | 16 | 28 | 5 | .179 | 0 | 2 |
| Frank Burke | 8 | 9 | 3 | .333 | 0 | 1 |
| Matty Fitzgerald | 4 | 6 | 4 | .667 | 0 | 2 |
| John McGraw | 4 | 2 | 0 | .000 | 0 | 0 |

=== Pitching ===
==== Starting pitchers ====
Note: G = Games pitched; IP = Innings pitched; W = Wins; L = Losses; ERA = Earned run average; SO = Strikeouts

| Player | G | IP | W | L | ERA | SO |
|---|---|---|---|---|---|---|
| Joe McGinnity | 45 | 339.2 | 27 | 12 | 2.25 | 105 |
| Christy Mathewson | 38 | 266.2 | 22 | 12 | 2.97 | 128 |
| Hooks Wiltse | 38 | 249.1 | 16 | 11 | 2.27 | 125 |
| Dummy Taylor | 31 | 213.0 | 17 | 9 | 2.20 | 91 |
| Red Ames | 31 | 203.1 | 12 | 10 | 2.66 | 156 |

==== Other pitchers ====
Note: G = Games pitched; IP = Innings pitched; W = Wins; L = Losses; ERA = Earned run average; SO = Strikeouts

| Player | G | IP | W | L | ERA | SO |
|---|---|---|---|---|---|---|
| Henry Mathewson | 2 | 10.0 | 0 | 1 | 5.40 | 2 |

==== Relief pitchers ====
Note: G = Games pitched; W = Wins; L = Losses; SV = Saves; ERA = Earned run average; SO = Strikeouts

| Player | G | W | L | SV | ERA | SO |
|---|---|---|---|---|---|---|
| George Ferguson | 22 | 2 | 0 | 7 | 2.58 | 32 |

== Awards and honors ==
=== League top five finishers ===
Red Ames

- #3 in NL in strikeouts (156)

Roger Bresnahan

- #2 in NL in on-base percentage (.419)

Art Devlin

- #3 in NL in stolen bases (54)

Joe McGinnity

- MLB leader in wins (27)

Sammy Strang

- MLB leader in on-base percentage (.423)
- #3 in NL in slugging percentage (.434)
