= 1906 Pittsburgh Pirates season =

1906 Pittsburgh Pirates
- League: National League
- Ballpark: Exposition Park
- City: Allegheny, Pennsylvania
- Owners: Barney Dreyfuss
- Managers: Fred Clarke

The 1906 Pittsburgh (Note: In the early 20th century and earlier, the name of Pittsburgh was spelled with and without the final 'h'.) Pirates season was the 25th season of the Pittsburgh Pirates franchise; the 20th in the National League. The Pirates finished third in the league standings with a record of 93–60.

== Regular season ==
=== Season standings ===
National League
Team	W	L	Pct.	GB	Home	Road
Chicago Cubs	116	36	.763	—	56‍–‍21	60‍–‍15
New York Giants	96	56	.632	20	51‍–‍24	45‍–‍32
Pittsburgh Pirates	93	60	.608	23½	49‍–‍27	44‍–‍33
Philadelphia Phillies	71	82	.464	45½	37‍–‍40	34‍–‍42
Brooklyn Superbas	66	86	.434	50	31‍–‍44	35‍–‍42
Cincinnati Reds	64	87	.424	51½	36‍–‍40	28‍–‍47
St. Louis Cardinals	52	98	.347	63	28‍–‍48	24‍–‍50
Boston Beaneaters	49	102	.325	66½	28‍–‍47	21‍–‍55

=== Record vs. opponents ===
1906 National League record Sources:
Team	BSN	BRO	CHC	CIN	NYG	PHI	PIT	STL
Boston	—	9–13	5–17	11–10–1	6–15	6–16	3–19	9–12
Brooklyn	13–9	—	6–16	8–14	9–13	8–13	9–13	13–8–1
Chicago	17–5	16–6	—	18–4	15–7–1	19–3–1	16–5	15–6–1
Cincinnati	10–11–1	14–8	4–18	—	5–16	11–11	8–14–1	12–9–2
New York	15–6	13–9	7–15–1	16–5	—	15–7	11–11	19–3
Philadelphia	16–6	13–8	3–19–1	11–11	7–15	—	8–14	13–9
Pittsburgh	19–3	13–9	5–16	14–8–1	11–11	14–8	—	17–5
St. Louis	12–9	8–13–1	6–15–1	9–12–2	3–19	9–13	5–17	—

=== Roster ===
1906 Pittsburgh Pirates
Roster
Pitchers: King Brady; Howie Camnitz; Charlie Case; Homer Hillebrand; Ed Karger; Sam Leever; Lefty Leifield; Mike Lynch; Lou Manske; Bert Maxwell; Chappie McFarland; Irish McIlveen; Deacon Phillippe; Vic Willis	Catchers: Fred Carisch; George Gibson; Heinie Peitz; Ed Phelps; Harry Smith; Infielders: Bill Abstein; Tommy Leach; Jim Nealon; Claude Ritchey; Tommy Sheehan; Alan Storke; Honus Wagner	Outfielders: Ginger Beaumont; Fred Clarke; Otis Clymer; Bob Ganley; Bill Hallman; Dutch Meier	Manager: Fred Clarke

== Player stats ==
=== Batting ===
==== Starters by position ====
Note: Pos = Position; G = Games played; AB = At bats; H = Hits; Avg. = Batting average; HR = Home runs; RBI = Runs batted in

Pos	Player	G	AB	H	Avg.	HR	RBI
C	George Gibson	81	259	46	.178	0	20
1B	Joe Nealon	154	556	142	.255	3	83
2B	Claude Ritchey	152	484	130	.269	1	62
SS	Honus Wagner	142	516	175	.339	2	71
3B	Tommy Sheehan	95	315	76	.241	1	34
OF	Fred Clarke	118	417	129	.309	1	39
OF	Ginger Beaumont	80	310	82	.265	2	32
OF	Bob Ganley	137	511	132	.258	0	31

==== Other batters ====
Note: G = Games played; AB = At bats; H = Hits; Avg. = Batting average; HR = Home runs; RBI = Runs batted in

Player	G	AB	H	Avg.	HR	RBI
Tommy Leach	133	476	136	.286	1	39
Dutch Meier	82	273	70	.256	0	16
Heinie Peitz	40	125	30	.240	0	20
Ed Phelps	43	118	28	.237	0	12
Bill Hallman	23	89	24	.270	1	6
Otis Clymer	11	45	11	.244	0	1
Bill Abstein	8	20	4	.200	0	3
Alan Storke	5	12	3	.250	0	1
Fred Carisch	4	12	1	.083	0	0
Harry Smith	1	1	0	.000	0	0

=== Pitching ===
==== Starting pitchers ====
Note: G = Games pitched; IP = Innings pitched; W = Wins; L = Losses; ERA = Earned run average; SO = Strikeouts

Player	G	IP	W	L	ERA	SO
Vic Willis	41	322.0	23	13	1.73	124
Sam Leever	36	260.1	22	7	2.32	76
Lefty Leifield	37	255.2	18	13	1.87	111
Deacon Phillippe	33	218.2	15	10	2.47	90
Mike Lynch	18	119.0	6	5	2.42	48
Bert Maxwell	1	8.0	0	1	5.63	1

==== Other pitchers ====
Note: G = Games pitched; IP = Innings pitched; W = Wins; L = Losses; ERA = Earned run average; SO = Strikeouts

Player	G	IP	W	L	ERA	SO
Homer Hillebrand	7	53.0	3	2	2.21	32
Chappie McFarland	6	35.1	1	3	2.55	11
Ed Karger	6	28.0	2	3	1.93	8
King Brady	3	23.0	1	1	2.35	14
Charlie Case	2	11.0	1	1	5.73	3
Howie Camnitz	2	9.0	1	0	2.00	5
Lou Manske	2	8.0	0	0	5.63	6
Irish McIlveen	2	7.0	0	1	7.71	3
