= List of Major League Baseball single-inning strikeout leaders =

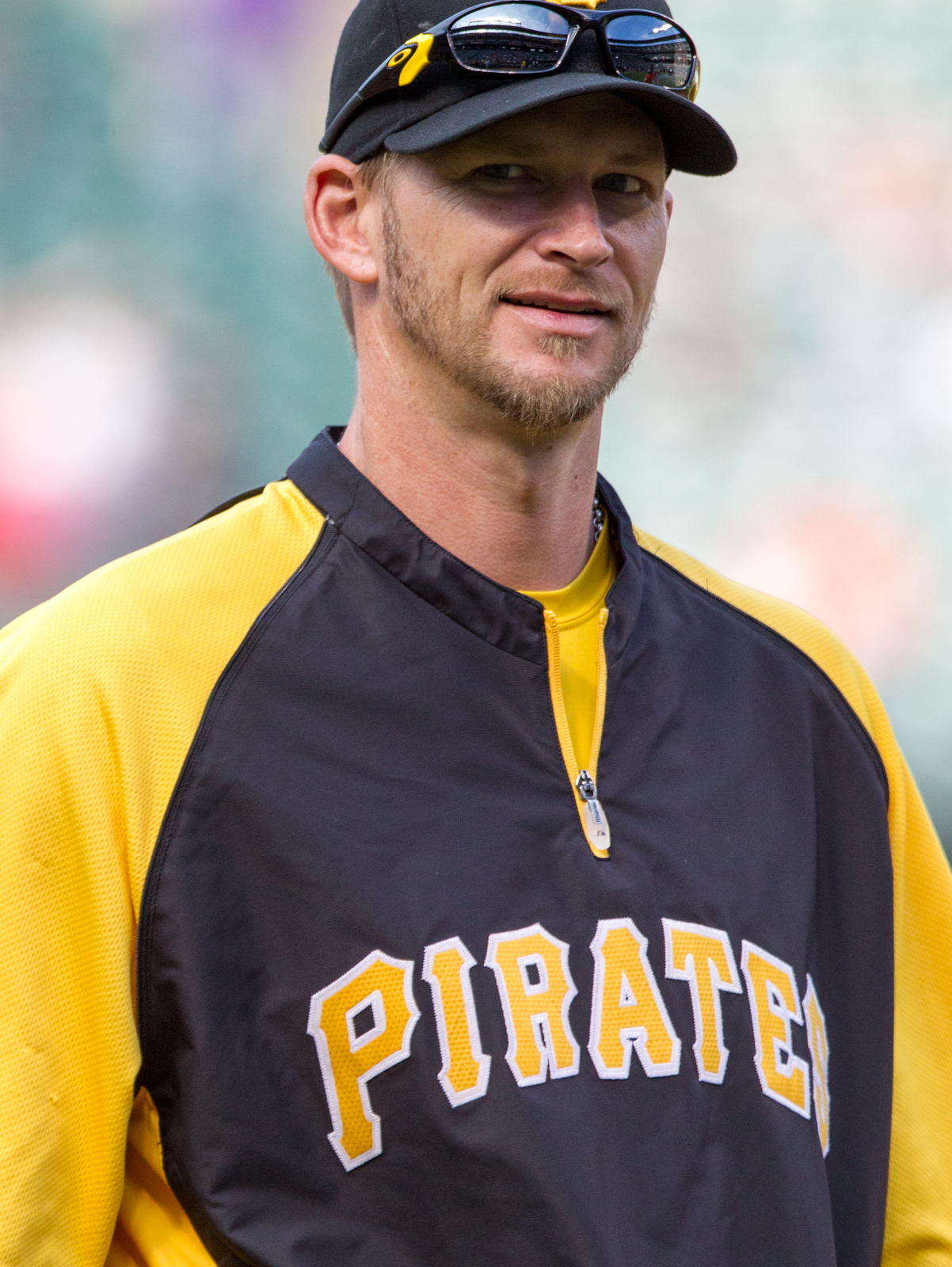
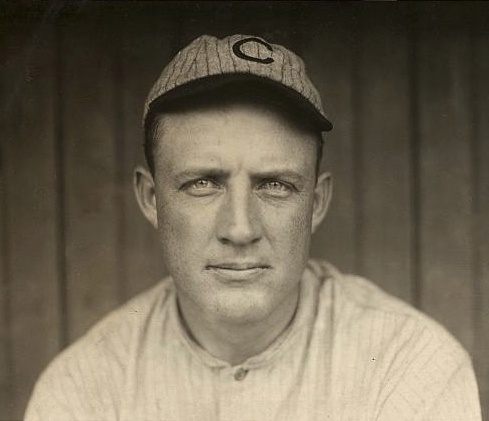
A. J. Burnett (left) is one of five pitchers to strike out four batters in one inning on multiple occasions, while Orval Overall (right) is the only pitcher to do so in the World Series.

In baseball, a strikeout occurs when a pitcher throws three strikes to a batter during his time at bat. Under Rules 6.05 and 6.09 of the Official Rules of Major League Baseball, a batter becomes a runner when a third strike is not caught by the catcher with no runner on first base or when there are two outs. The strikeout is recorded, but the batter-runner must be tagged or forced out in order for the defensive team to register the out. If the struck-out batter-runner reaches base and no out is recorded, it becomes possible for a pitcher to record more than three strikeouts in an inning.

As a result of this rule, 100 different pitchers have struck out four batters in a half-inning of a Major League Baseball (MLB) game, the most recent being Mason Miller of the San Diego Padres on May 9, 2026. Five players – Chuck Finley, A. J. Burnett, Zack Greinke, Craig Kimbrel, and Tyler Glasnow – have accomplished the feat more than once in their career; no player has ever struck out more than four batters in an inning.

Ed Crane was the first player to strike out four batters in one inning, doing so in the fifth inning for the New York Giants against the Chicago White Stockings on October 4, 1888. It was a relatively rare feat before 1960, with no occurrences at all between June 11, 1916 and May 27, 1956 — nearly 40 years. Since 1990 it has become much more common, with multiple occurrences in most years; the most in one season was in 2012, with eight. It has never happened twice in a game, though on two occasions (October 4, 2009 and September 20, 2012) it happened in two different games on the same day.

Out of the 100 pitchers who have accomplished the feat, 75 were right-handed and 25 were left-handed. Finley is the only pitcher to achieve the feat twice in a single season, and the only one to do it on three occasions (and all within a one-year span). Pete Richert struck out four batters in the third inning of his first major league game, becoming the only player to attain the milestone in his debut. Orval Overall is the sole player to strike out four batters in one inning in the World Series.

Of the players eligible for the Baseball Hall of Fame who have struck out four batters in an inning, four have been elected: Don Drysdale, Bob Gibson, Walter Johnson, and Phil Niekro. Players are eligible for the Hall of Fame if they have played in at least 10 major league seasons, and have either been retired for five seasons or dead for at least six months.

== Players ==
Key
Pitcher (X)	Name of the pitcher and number of four strikeout innings they had pitched at that point
Date	Date of the game
Team	The player's team at the time of the game
Opposing team	The team against whom the pitcher struck out four batters in one inning
Inning	The inning in which the pitcher struck out four batters
Batters faced (X)	The four batters who were struck out and number of four strikeout innings they had batted in at that point
Box	Box score with play by play (if available)
º	Indicates that the pitcher struck out all four batters consecutively
§	Denotes the batter(s) who reached base
¤	Pitched during no-hitter
†	Elected to the Baseball Hall of Fame
‡	Player is active (Note: A player is considered inactive if he has announced his retirement or not played for a full season.) (Note: The Baseball Almanac general reference below links to the profiles of each player, where their active status can be verified.)

MLB pitchers who have struck out four batters in one inning
Pitcher	Date	Team	Opposing team	Inning	Batters faced	Box
Ed Crane^{º}	October 4, 1888	New York Giants	Chicago White Stockings	5th	Fred Pfeffer, Ned Williamson, Tom Burns^{§}, John Tener	n/a
Doc White	July 21, 1902	Philadelphia Phillies	Brooklyn Superbas	5th	Jimmy Sheckard, Bill Dahlen, Charlie Irwin, Ed Wheeler (Note: Order unknown)	
Hooks Wiltse^{º}	May 15, 1906	New York Giants	Cincinnati Reds	5th	Jim Delahanty^{§}, Tommy Corcoran, Admiral Schlei, Chick Fraser	
Orval Overall	October 14, 1908	Chicago Cubs	Detroit Tigers	1st	Charley O'Leary, Ty Cobb, Claude Rossman^{§}, Germany Schaefer	
Walter Johnson^{†}	April 15, 1911	Washington Senators	Boston Red Sox	5th	Ray Collins, Larry Gardner^{§}, Harry Hooper, Duffy Lewis	
Guy Morton	June 11, 1916	Cleveland Indians	Philadelphia Athletics	6th	Whitey Witt^{§}, Charlie Pick, Nap Lajoie, Stuffy McInnis	
Jim Davis^{º}	May 27, 1956	Chicago Cubs	St. Louis Cardinals	6th	Hal Smith, Jackie Brandt, Lindy McDaniel^{§}, Don Blasingame	
Joe Nuxhall	August 11, 1959	Cincinnati Redlegs	Milwaukee Braves	6th	Eddie Mathews, Joe Adcock, Del Crandall^{§}, Johnny Logan	
Ryne Duren	May 18, 1961	Los Angeles Angels	Chicago White Sox	7th	Minnie Miñoso, Roy Sievers^{§}, J. C. Martin, Sammy Esposito	
Pete Richert^{º}	April 12, 1962	Los Angeles Dodgers	Cincinnati Reds	3rd	Frank Robinson, Gordy Coleman^{§}, Wally Post, Johnny Edwards	
Lee Stange	September 2, 1964	Cleveland Indians	Washington Senators	7th	Don Lock^{§}, Willie Kirkland, Don Zimmer, John Kennedy	
Don Drysdale^{º}^{†}	April 17, 1965	Los Angeles Dodgers	Philadelphia Phillies	2nd	Wes Covington^{§}, Tony González, Dick Stuart, Clay Dalrymple	
Bob Gibson^{†}	June 7, 1966	St. Louis Cardinals	Pittsburgh Pirates	4th	Jerry Lynch, Jim Pagliaroni, Bill Mazeroski^{§}, Don Cardwell	
Mike Cuellar^{º}	May 29, 1970	Baltimore Orioles	California Angels	4th	Alex Johnson^{§}, Ken McMullen, Tommie Reynolds, Jim Spencer	
Bill Bonham^{º}	July 31, 1974	Chicago Cubs	Montreal Expos	2nd	Mike Torrez^{§}, Ron Hunt, Tim Foli, Willie Davis	
Phil Niekro^{†}	July 29, 1977	Atlanta Braves	Pittsburgh Pirates	6th	Dave Parker, Bill Robinson, Rennie Stennett^{§}, Omar Moreno	
Mike Paxton^{º}	July 21, 1978	Cleveland Indians	Seattle Mariners	5th	Dan Meyer^{§}, Bruce Bochte, Tom Paciorek, Bill Stein	
Mario Soto^{º}	May 17, 1984	Cincinnati Reds	Chicago Cubs	3rd	Tom Veryzer, Dick Ruthven, Bob Dernier^{§}, Ryne Sandberg	
Mike Scott	September 3, 1986	Houston Astros	Chicago Cubs	5th	Chris Speier^{§}, Chico Walker, Dave Martinez, Ryne Sandberg (2)	
Bobby Witt^{º}	August 2, 1987	Texas Rangers	Baltimore Orioles	2nd	Ray Knight, Terry Kennedy^{§}, Mike Young, Ken Gerhart	
Charlie Hough	July 4, 1988	Texas Rangers	New York Yankees	1st	Claudell Washington^{§}, Jack Clark, Dave Winfield, Mike Pagliarulo	
Paul Assenmacher	August 22, 1989	Atlanta Braves	St. Louis Cardinals	5th	Terry Pendleton, Milt Thompson, Tony Peña^{§}, Ted Power	
Tim Birtsas	June 4, 1990	Cincinnati Reds	San Francisco Giants	7th	Greg Litton, Will Clark, Matt Williams^{§}, Gary Carter	
Matt Young	September 9, 1990	Seattle Mariners	Boston Red Sox	1st	Jody Reed, Carlos Quintana, Wade Boggs^{§}, Mike Greenwell	
Paul Shuey	May 14, 1994	Cleveland Indians	Detroit Tigers	9th	Chad Kreuter, Chris Gomez, Travis Fryman^{§}, Cecil Fielder	
Mark Wohlers^{º}	June 7, 1995	Atlanta Braves	Chicago Cubs	9th	Kevin Roberson, Rick Wilkins, Shawon Dunston^{§}, Sammy Sosa	
Bruce Ruffin	July 25, 1996	Colorado Rockies	Chicago Cubs	9th	Sammy Sosa (2), Scott Servais^{§}, Leo Gómez, Brian McRae	
Kevin Appier^{º}	September 3, 1996	Kansas City Royals	Toronto Blue Jays	4th	Ed Sprague Jr., Carlos Delgado^{§}, Charlie O'Brien, Alex Gonzalez	
Derek Wallace	September 13, 1996	New York Mets	Atlanta Braves	9th	Terry Pendleton^{§} (2), Chipper Jones, Ryan Klesko, Mike Mordecai	
Wilson Álvarez^{º}	July 21, 1997	Chicago White Sox	Detroit Tigers	7th	Tony Clark, Phil Nevin^{§}, Melvin Nieves, Orlando Miller	
Blake Stein	July 27, 1998	Oakland Athletics	Tampa Bay Devil Rays	4th	Bubba Trammell, Rich Butler, Mike DiFelice^{§}, Kevin Stocker	
Kirt Ojala^{º}	September 16, 1998	Florida Marlins	Montreal Expos	4th	Fernando Seguignol, Vladimir Guerrero^{§}, Shane Andrews, Brad Fullmer	
Archie Corbin	April 28, 1999	Florida Marlins	Chicago Cubs	7th	Benito Santiago, Tyler Houston^{§}, Steve Trachsel, Mickey Morandini	
Chuck Finley	May 12, 1999	Anaheim Angels	New York Yankees	3rd	Scott Brosius, Chuck Knoblauch, Derek Jeter^{§}, Paul O'Neill	
Jerry Spradlin	July 22, 1999	San Francisco Giants	San Diego Padres	7th	George Arias, Damian Jackson, Carlos Baerga^{§}, Quilvio Veras	
Tim Wakefield	August 10, 1999	Boston Red Sox	Kansas City Royals	9th	Chad Kreuter, Scott Pose, Johnny Damon^{§}, Carlos Beltrán	
Chuck Finley^{º} (2)	August 15, 1999	Anaheim Angels	Detroit Tigers	1st	Deivi Cruz, Juan Encarnación, Dean Palmer^{§}, Tony Clark	
Steve Kline^{º}	August 17, 1999	Montreal Expos	San Francisco Giants	7th	Brent Mayne, Shawn Estes^{§}, Marvin Benard, Ramón Martínez	
Chuck Finley (3)	April 16, 2000	Cleveland Indians	Texas Rangers	3rd	Tom Evans, Royce Clayton, Chad Curtis^{§}, Rafael Palmeiro	
Erik Hiljus	June 30, 2001	Oakland Athletics	Texas Rangers	7th	Bo Porter, Michael Young^{§}, Bill Haselman, Scott Sheldon	
Frank Rodriguez	July 22, 2001	Cincinnati Reds	Florida Marlins	7th	Charles Johnson, Dave Berg, Ryan Thompson^{§}, Mike Lowell	
A. J. Burnett	July 5, 2002	Florida Marlins	New York Mets	1st	Mike Piazza, Mo Vaughn, Timo Pérez^{§}, Roger Cedeño	
Kerry Wood^{º}	September 2, 2002	Chicago Cubs	Milwaukee Brewers	4th	Bill Hall^{§}, Ryan Thompson (2), Paul Bako^{§}, Andrew Lorraine	
Kazuhiro Sasaki^{º}	April 4, 2003	Seattle Mariners	Texas Rangers	9th	Todd Greene, Carl Everett^{§}, Michael Young (2), Mike Lamb	
Darren Dreifort	May 22, 2003	Los Angeles Dodgers	Colorado Rockies	2nd	Bobby Estalella, Brent Butler, Aaron Cook^{§}, Greg Norton	
Octavio Dotel^{¤º}	June 11, 2003	Houston Astros	New York Yankees	8th	Juan Rivera, Alfonso Soriano^{§}, Derek Jeter (2), Jason Giambi	
Brad Lidge	June 13, 2004	Houston Astros	Milwaukee Brewers	7th	Geoff Jenkins^{§}, Keith Ginter, Ben Grieve, Chad Moeller	
Mike Stanton	August 3, 2004	New York Mets	Milwaukee Brewers	8th	Gary Bennett, Scott Podsednik^{§}, Trent Durrington, Wes Helms	
Jon Rauch	April 26, 2006	Washington Nationals	Cincinnati Reds	8th	David Ross, Bronson Arroyo, Felipe López^{§}, Adam Dunn	
Brad Penny	September 23, 2006	Los Angeles Dodgers	Arizona Diamondbacks	2nd	Chad Tracy^{§}, Stephen Drew, Miguel Batista, Eric Byrnes	
Scott Baker^{º}	June 15, 2008	Minnesota Twins	Milwaukee Brewers	3rd	Ryan Braun, Prince Fielder^{§}, Russell Branyan, Mike Cameron	
Scot Shields	June 21, 2008	Los Angeles Angels	Philadelphia Phillies	8th	Greg Dobbs, Jimmy Rollins, Shane Victorino^{§}, Ryan Howard	
Ryan Dempster	October 4, 2009	Chicago Cubs	Arizona Diamondbacks	5th	Stephen Drew (2), Gerardo Parra^{§}, Justin Upton, Mark Reynolds	
Luke Gregerson	October 4, 2009	San Diego Padres	San Francisco Giants	7th	Randy Winn, Eugenio Vélez^{§}, Andrés Torres, Juan Uribe	
Félix Hernández^{º}	June 3, 2010	Seattle Mariners	Minnesota Twins	8th	Denard Span, Matt Tolbert, Joe Mauer^{§}, Justin Morneau	
Manny Parra	June 6, 2010	Milwaukee Brewers	St. Louis Cardinals	4th	Albert Pujols, Ryan Ludwick, Yadier Molina^{§}, Colby Rasmus	
A. J. Burnett^{º} (2)	June 24, 2011	New York Yankees	Colorado Rockies	6th	Chris Iannetta, Carlos González, Chris Nelson^{§}, Todd Helton	
Justin Masterson^{º}	August 4, 2011	Cleveland Indians	Boston Red Sox	2nd	Josh Reddick^{§}, Jason Varitek, Marco Scutaro, Jacoby Ellsbury	
Jeremy Hellickson^{º}	August 25, 2011	Tampa Bay Rays	Detroit Tigers	3rd	Austin Jackson^{§}, Ramón Santiago, Delmon Young, Víctor Martínez	
Yovani Gallardo^{º}	September 17, 2011	Milwaukee Brewers	Cincinnati Reds	5th	Devin Mesoraco, Edinson Vólquez, Brandon Phillips^{§}, Édgar Rentería	
Bud Norris	April 24, 2012	Houston Astros	Milwaukee Brewers	3rd	Travis Ishikawa^{§}, Randy Wolf, Rickie Weeks, Ryan Braun (2)	
Ryan Cook^{º}	April 27, 2012	Oakland Athletics	Baltimore Orioles	8th	J. J. Hardy, Nick Markakis, Adam Jones^{§}, Matt Wieters	
Francisco Liriano^{º}	June 5, 2012	Minnesota Twins	Kansas City Royals	4th	Mike Moustakas, Jeff Francoeur^{§}, Eric Hosmer, Brayan Peña	
Steve Delabar^{º}	August 13, 2012	Toronto Blue Jays	Chicago White Sox	10th	Dayán Viciedo, Tyler Flowers^{§}, Gordon Beckham, Alejandro De Aza	
Jason Berken^{º}	September 20, 2012	Chicago Cubs	Cincinnati Reds	2nd	Denis Phipps, Ryan Hanigan^{§}, Didi Gregorius, Johnny Cueto	
Phil Hughes^{º}	September 20, 2012	New York Yankees	Toronto Blue Jays	4th	J. P. Arencibia, Adeiny Hechavarria^{§}, Anthony Gose, Brett Lawrie	
Zack Greinke^{º}	September 25, 2012	Los Angeles Angels	Seattle Mariners	4th	John Jaso, Eric Thames, Trayvon Robinson^{§}, Brendan Ryan	
Craig Kimbrel^{º}^{‡}	September 26, 2012	Atlanta Braves	Miami Marlins	9th	Greg Dobbs (2), Donovan Solano^{§}, John Buck, Gil Velazquez	
Tony Cingrani	April 28, 2013	Cincinnati Reds	Washington Nationals	4th	Denard Span^{§} (2), Bryce Harper, Ian Desmond, Adam LaRoche	
Alex Cobb^{º}	May 10, 2013	Tampa Bay Rays	San Diego Padres	3rd	Will Venable^{§}, Chase Headley, Carlos Quentin, Yonder Alonso	
Aníbal Sánchez	October 12, 2013	Detroit Tigers	Boston Red Sox	1st	Jacoby Ellsbury (2), Shane Victorino^{§} (2), David Ortiz, Mike Napoli	
Zack Greinke^{º} (2)	July 25, 2014	Los Angeles Dodgers	San Francisco Giants	3rd	Héctor Sánchez, Tim Lincecum, Hunter Pence^{§}, Gregor Blanco	
Justin Grimm	August 29, 2014	Chicago Cubs	St. Louis Cardinals	9th	Oscar Taveras, Daniel Descalso^{§}, Matt Carpenter, Kolten Wong	
Óliver Pérez^{º}	September 20, 2014	Arizona Diamondbacks	Colorado Rockies	7th	Justin Morneau^{§}, Corey Dickerson, Michael McKenry, Matt McBride	
Kenley Jansen^{º}^{‡}	May 15, 2015	Los Angeles Dodgers	Colorado Rockies	8th	Carlos González^{§} (2), Nick Hundley, Drew Stubbs, DJ LeMahieu	
Sergio Santos	May 16, 2015	Los Angeles Dodgers	Colorado Rockies	8th	DJ LeMahieu^{§} (2), Drew Stubbs (2), Wilin Rosario, Michael McKenry (2)	
Will Smith^{º}	October 4, 2015	Milwaukee Brewers	Chicago Cubs	9th	Miguel Montero, Addison Russell^{§}, Javier Báez, Austin Jackson (2)	
Tyler Duffey	May 8, 2016	Minnesota Twins	Chicago White Sox	7th	Brett Lawrie (2), Avisaíl García, Dioner Navarro^{§}, Austin Jackson (3)	
Julio Teherán	May 24, 2016	Atlanta Braves	Milwaukee Brewers	2nd	Jonathan Lucroy, Chris Carter, Kirk Nieuwenhuis^{§}, Ramón Flores	
Ken Giles	August 7, 2016	Houston Astros	Texas Rangers	9th	Nomar Mazara^{§}, Shin-Soo Choo, Ian Desmond (2), Jurickson Profar	
Jake Thompson	August 12, 2016	Philadelphia Phillies	Colorado Rockies	2nd	David Dahl^{§}, Ben Paulsen, Daniel Descalso (2), Jon Gray	
James Paxton	September 6, 2016	Seattle Mariners	Texas Rangers	1st	Delino DeShields Jr., Ian Desmond^{§} (3), Jonathan Lucroy (2), Elvis Andrus	
Jon Gray^{º}^{‡}	September 17, 2016	Colorado Rockies	San Diego Padres	2nd	Ryan Schimpf, Jon Jay^{§}, Oswaldo Arcia, Derek Norris	
Nate Karns	May 3, 2017	Kansas City Royals	Chicago White Sox	6th	Matt Davidson, Tim Anderson, Yolmer Sánchez^{§}, Jose Abreu	
Craig Kimbrel^{‡} (2)	May 25, 2017	Boston Red Sox	Texas Rangers	9th	Nomar Mazara^{§} (2), Jonathan Lucroy (3), Rougned Odor, Mike Napoli (2)	
Mike Bolsinger^{º}	July 18, 2017	Toronto Blue Jays	Boston Red Sox	13th	Mitch Moreland, Jackie Bradley Jr.^{§}, Christian Vázquez, Deven Marrero	
Zack Godley	August 13, 2017	Arizona Diamondbacks	Chicago Cubs	1st	Jon Jay (2), Tommy La Stella, Victor Caratini^{§}, Kyle Schwarber	
Zach Duke	March 29, 2018	Minnesota Twins	Baltimore Orioles	7th	Trey Mancini^{§}, Tim Beckham, Craig Gentry, Chris Davis	
Ryan Dull	April 17, 2018	Oakland Athletics	Chicago White Sox	8th	Omar Narvaez^{§}, Avisail Garcia (2), Jose Abreu (2), Matt Davidson (2)	
Miguel Díaz	July 8, 2018	San Diego Padres	Arizona Diamondbacks	11th	Ketel Marte, Jake Lamb, Chris Owings^{§}, Jon Jay (3)	
German Marquez^{‡}	October 1, 2018	Colorado Rockies	Los Angeles Dodgers	4th	Max Muncy^{§}, Manny Machado, Yasmani Grandal, Walker Buehler	
Luke Bard	April 22, 2019	Los Angeles Angels	New York Yankees	14th	Gleyber Torres^{§}, Clint Frazier, Mike Tauchman, Kyle Higashioka	
Tyler Glasnow^{‡}	April 23, 2021	Tampa Bay Rays	Toronto Blue Jays	1st	Cavan Biggio, Bo Bichette, Lourdes Gurriel Jr.^{§}, Danny Jansen	
Lance McCullers Jr.^{‡}	May 22, 2021	Houston Astros	Texas Rangers	1st	Nate Lowe, Adolis Garcia, Joey Gallo^{§}, Khris Davis	
Clayton Kershaw^{º}	June 11, 2021	Los Angeles Dodgers	Texas Rangers	4th	Eli White, Adolis Garcia^{§} (2), Joey Gallo (2), Nick Solak	
Jonathan Loáisiga^{º}^{‡}	June 25, 2021	New York Yankees	Boston Red Sox	7th	Michael Chavis^{§}, Alex Verdugo, J.D. Martinez, Xander Bogaerts	
Domingo Germán^{º}	July 25, 2021	New York Yankees	Boston Red Sox	7th	Jarren Duran, Xander Bogaerts^{§} (2), Rafael Devers, J.D. Martinez (2)	
Craig Stammen	September 24, 2021	San Diego Padres	Atlanta Braves	6th	Ozzie Albies^{§}, Austin Riley, Eddie Rosario, Dansby Swanson	
Michael Rucker^{‡}	April 30, 2022	Chicago Cubs	Milwaukee Brewers	5th	Keston Hiura, Lorenzo Cain, Alex Jackson^{§}, Andrew McCutchen	
Chris Martin^{º}^{‡}	August 15, 2022	Los Angeles Dodgers	Milwaukee Brewers	6th	Andrew McCutchen^{§} (2), Kolten Wong (2), Hunter Renfroe, Rowdy Tellez	
Tyler Glasnow^{‡} (2)	July 7, 2023	Tampa Bay Rays	Atlanta Braves	2nd	Matt Olson, Sean Murphy, Marcell Ozuna^{§}, Eddie Rosario (2)	
Steven Matz^{‡}	June 19, 2025	St. Louis Cardinals	Chicago White Sox	6th	Lenyn Sosa^{§}, Austin Slater, Mike Tauchman, Chase Meidroth	
Aroldis Chapman^{º}^{‡}	September 7, 2025	Boston Red Sox	Arizona Diamondbacks	9th	Blaze Alexander, Ildemaro Vargas^{§}, Tyler Locklear, Jordan Lawlar	
Jeff Hoffman^{‡}	March 27, 2026	Toronto Blue Jays	Athletics	9th	Nick Kurtz, Tyler Soderstrom^{§}, Brent Rooker, Jacob Wilson	
Mason Miller^{‡}	May 9, 2026	San Diego Padres	St. Louis Cardinals	9th	Masyn Winn, Thomas Saggese, Yohel Pozo^{§}, JJ Wetherholt	

== See also ==
- List of Major League Baseball pitchers who have struck out three batters on nine pitches
