= Harry Curtis (baseball) =

American baseball player (1883-1951)

- Catcher
- Born: February 19, 1883; Portland, Maine, U.S.
- Died: August 1, 1951 (aged 68); Evanston, Illinois, U.S.
- Batted: Unknown Threw: Right

MLB debut
- August 28, 1907, for the New York Giants

Last MLB appearance
- October 5, 1907, for the New York Giants
- Stats at Baseball Reference

Teams
- New York Giants (1907)

Harry Albert Curtis (February 19, 1883 – August 1, 1951) was an American catcher in Major League Baseball who played briefly for the New York Giants during the 1907 season. He threw right-handed (batting side unknown). A native of Portland, Maine, he attended University of Notre Dame and Syracuse University.

Little is known about this player on a Giants uniform. Curtis was 23 years old when he entered the majors on September 27, 1899, appearing in 11 games as a backup for the team's regular catcher Roger Bresnahan. Parker posted a .222 batting average (2-for-9) with two runs, one RBI, two stolen bases, and a .364 on-base percentage. He played his final game on October 5, and never appeared in a major-league game again.

In 1908, Curtis served as the first bench coach of the Notre Dame Fighting Irish baseball team.

Curtis died in Evanston, Illinois, at the age of 68.

== See also ==
- 1907 New York Giants season
