= Ball Bluff, Minnesota =

Unincorporated community in Minnesota, US

Ball Bluff
- Unincorporated community
- Location within Minnesota Location within the United States
- Coordinates: 46°57′17″N 93°16′24″W
- Country: United States
- State: Minnesota
- County: Aitkin
- Township: Ball Bluff Township
- Elevation: 1,250 ft (380 m)
- Time zone: UTC-6 (Central (CST))
  - Summer (DST): UTC-5 (CDT)
- ZIP code: 55752, 55784, 56469, and 55760
- Area code: 218
- GNIS feature ID: 654582

Ball Bluff is an unincorporated community in Ball Bluff Township, Aitkin County, Minnesota, United States. The community is located between Jacobson and McGregor along State Highway 65 (MN 65). The Mississippi River flows nearby.

Nearby places include Jacobson, Swan River, Libby, and Palisade. Ball Bluff is 10 miles south of Swan River, and 26 miles north of McGregor.

The center of Ball Bluff is generally considered at the junction of Highway 65 and 650th Lane / Carmel Church Road. The community is located within the Savanna State Forest in the northeast portion of Aitkin County.
