= Jack Taylor (1900s pitcher) =

American baseball player (1873–1938)

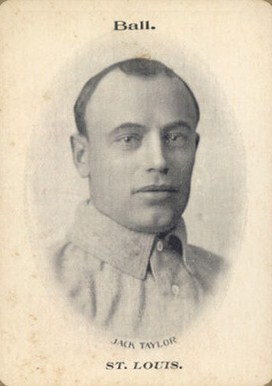
- Pitcher
- Born: January 14, 1874; New Straitsville, Ohio, U.S.
- Died: March 4, 1938 (aged 64); Columbus, Ohio, U.S.
- Batted: Right Threw: Right

MLB debut
- September 25, 1898, for the Chicago Orphans

Last MLB appearance
- September 7, 1907, for the Chicago Cubs

MLB statistics
- Win–loss record: 152–139
- Earned run average: 2.65
- Strikeouts: 662
- Stats at Baseball Reference

Teams
- Chicago Orphans/Cubs (1898–1903); St. Louis Cardinals (1904–1906); Chicago Cubs (1906–1907)

Career highlights and awards
- MLB record 187 consecutive complete games; World Series champion (1907); NL ERA leader (1902)

John W. Taylor (January 14, 1874 – March 4, 1938) was an American right-handed pitcher in Major League Baseball for the Chicago Cubs and St. Louis Cardinals.

== Career ==
He made his major league debut with the Cubs on September 25, 1898. His best years as a pitcher were 1900 (2.55 earned run average), 1902 (1.33 ERA with 7 shutouts; #1 in the league), 1903 (2.45 ERA), and 1906 (1.99 ERA). He recorded a career 2.65 ERA.

In 1904, Taylor set a major league record by pitching 39 consecutive complete games. Taylor actually threw 187 consecutive complete games between June 1901 and August 1906, but this streak was interrupted by 15 additional relief appearances. Thus Taylor appeared in 202 consecutive games without being relieved himself.

Taylor and fellow Cub Larry McLean were traded to the St. Louis Cardinals in return for Mordecai Brown and Jack O'Neill in December 1903; he was then traded back to Chicago in July 1906 (in return for Fred Beebe and Pete Noonan).

Thus he was part of the great 1906 Cubs; that year the ERA for the entire pitching staff was 1.76. He also contributed to the World Series-winning season in 1907.

Taylor was an above-average hitting pitcher in his major-league career, posting a .222 batting average (236-for-1063) with 110 runs, 2 home runs and 88 RBI. He also drew 66 bases on balls.

Taylor died in Columbus, Ohio at the age of 64.

== See also ==
- Complete game records
- Jack Taylor (1890s pitcher)
- List of Major League Baseball annual ERA leaders
- List of Major League Baseball career hit batsmen leaders
- List of Major League Baseball individual streaks
- List of St. Louis Cardinals team records

== Sources ==
- Pietrusza, David; Silverman, Matthew; Gershman, Michael, eds. (2000). Baseball:The Biographical Encyclopedia. Sports Illustrated. pp. 1112–1113. ISBN 1-892129-34-5.
