= Homer Smoot =

American baseball player (1878–1928)

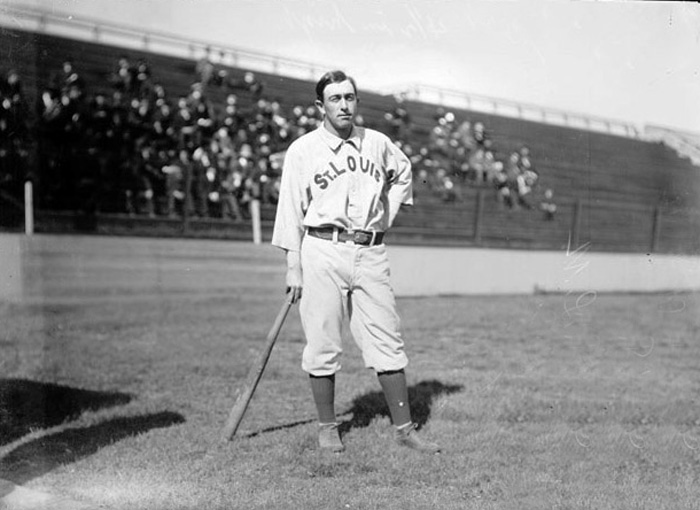
- Center fielder
- Born: March 23, 1878; Galestown, Maryland, U.S.
- Died: March 25, 1928 (aged 50); Salisbury, Maryland, U.S.
- Batted: Left Threw: Right

MLB debut
- April 17, 1902, for the St. Louis Cardinals

Last MLB appearance
- October 7, 1906, for the Cincinnati Reds

MLB statistics
- Batting average: .290
- Home runs: 15
- Runs batted in: 269
- Stats at Baseball Reference

Teams
- St. Louis Cardinals (1902–1906); Cincinnati Reds (1906)

Career highlights and awards
- Hit two inside the park home runs in one game

Homer Vernon Smoot (March 23, 1878 – March 25, 1928), nicknamed "Doc", was an American professional baseball player. He played five seasons in Major League Baseball, for the St. Louis Cardinals and Cincinnati Reds, from 1902 until 1906, primarily as a center fielder. He threw right-handed but batted left-handed.

== Early life ==
Born in Galestown, Maryland, Smoot was the eldest of the three children of Luke Smoot and Rebecca Wheatley-Smoot. He attended elementary school with Geneva Gordy, who became his wife in 1901. He attended prep school at Wesley Collegiate Academy in Dover, Delaware. He and his wife Geneva had five children – two boys and three girls.

Smoot attended Washington College in Chestertown, Maryland, where he played both football and baseball. While playing college baseball, he also played semi-professional baseball for multiple teams.

== Professional career ==
He signed his first professional contract in 1900, with the Allentown Peanuts of the Atlantic League. After the Atlantic League folded shortly after his signing, he signed with the Worcester Farmers of the Eastern League. He played the rest of the season with the Farmers, except for a ten-day period in which he played for the Providence Clamdiggers.

He again played for Worcester in 1901, hitting .356. Following that season, he was signed by the Cardinals. He made his major league debut on April 17, 1902, at the age of 24. Smoot and teammate George Barclay were the team's power hitters in 1902, hitting three home runs each, combining for six of the team's ten home runs. According to the Society for American Baseball Research, Smoot was the best rookie in 1902. Smoot is also one of the few players to hit two inside-the-park home runs in a single game, which he did on April 25.

Although 1903 was not nearly as successful for Smoot as 1902 was, he was still the team's main power hitter, belting four of the team's eight home runs. He also hit a fine .296 that season.

In 1904, Smoot's batting average dropped to .281, but he also had career highs of 23 doubles and 66 runs batted in. His 23 stolen bases and 37 walks were also career highs. He was not the team leader in home runs in 1904-in fact, his three home runs trailed behind two players, Dave Brain (seven) and Mike Grady (five).

1905 was perhaps Smoot's best season. Not only did he tie his career high in home runs with four (which tied with Grady for the team lead), he also had career highs in runs (73) and triples (16). His .311 average, which also tied a career high, led the team and was seventh highest in the league.

1906 saw Smoot's career take a rapid turn for the worse. He started the season with the Cardinals, hitting only .248 with them. That prompted a midseason trade with the Reds, who sent Shad Barry in return for Smoot. Although his average rose while with the Reds-he hit .259 with them-that could not save his season or his career. After hitting only .252 combined that season, his major league career was over. He played his final major league game on October 7. After the 1906 season, his contract was sold to the Toledo Mud Hens of the American Association.

Multiple explanations have been posed to explain the quick decline in production and from Smoot, and the quick end to his career. One claim is his eyesight became poor, although his obituary says his eyesight remained "undimmed". His obituary says he was slowed by muscular rheumatism. Luck may have also played a factor, and Smoot was just unlucky and didn't get the chance to play in the majors again.

Smoot played three years with Toledo, hitting .312 in 1907, .301 in 1908 and .270 in 1909. He played with the Louisville Colonels and Kansas City Blues-both in the American Association-in 1910, hitting .236 combined.

He started 1911 with the Blues, hitting .379 with them before his contract was sold to the Wilkes-Barre Barons of the New York State League. He won his only pro pennant in 1911.

He was an assistant manager and weekend player in 1912 for Wilkes-Barre, but the rheumatism got so bad he had to finish his playing days.

Smoot is the only player ever to have at least 500 at-bats in a season while playing in as many as five seasons. A .953 fielder, he hit .290 with 15 home runs and 269 RBI in his career. With 601 singles, 102 doubles, 45 triples, and 15 home runs for a career, he retired with exactly 1,000 total bases.

== Post-playing career ==
After his playing days, he became head coach at Washington College for a year. He spent ten years as a chicken farmer and operating a feed business before getting the chance to be involved in professional sports again. In 1925, he was manager of the Salisbury Indians of the Eastern Shore Baseball League. After only one year there, he returned to his feed business.

His son, Roger Smoot, signed a professional contract with the Cardinals in 1927. He died at age 50 in Salisbury, Maryland from spinal meningitis. He was inducted into Washington College's Athletic Hall of Fame in 1992.

He is buried in Galestown Cemetery in Galestown, Maryland.
