= Frank Jude =

American baseball player (1884–1961)

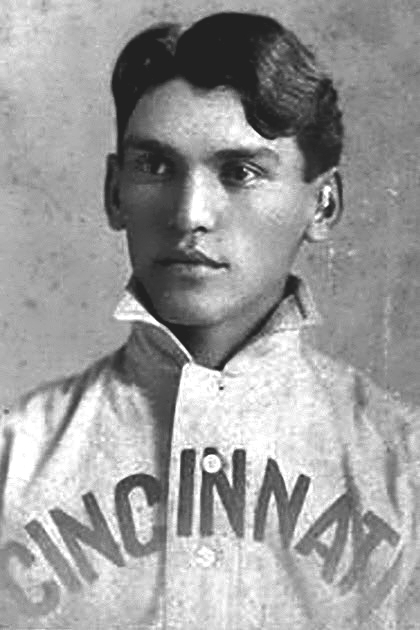
- Outfielder
- Born: November 11, 1884; Libby, Minnesota, U.S.
- Died: May 4, 1961 (aged 76); Brownsville, Texas, U.S.
- Batted: Right Threw: Right

MLB debut
- July 9, 1906, for the Cincinnati Reds

Last MLB appearance
- October 7, 1906, for the Cincinnati Reds

MLB statistics
- Batting average: .208
- Home runs: 1
- Runs batted in: 31
- Stats at Baseball Reference

Teams
- Cincinnati Reds (1906)

Frank Jude (Ojibwe: Gay-Bay-Aush; November 11, 1884 – May 4, 1961) was an American professional baseball player, who played as an outfielder in Major League Baseball. He played for the Cincinnati Reds in 1906.

== Background ==
Born in Libby, Minnesota on November 11, 1884, Frank Donald Jude had a European-American father and an Ojibwe mother. His Ojibwe name was Gay-Bay-Aush. He attended Carlisle Indian Industrial School, a Native American boarding school in Carlisle, Pennsylvania.
