= Sam Mertes =

American baseball player (1872–1945)

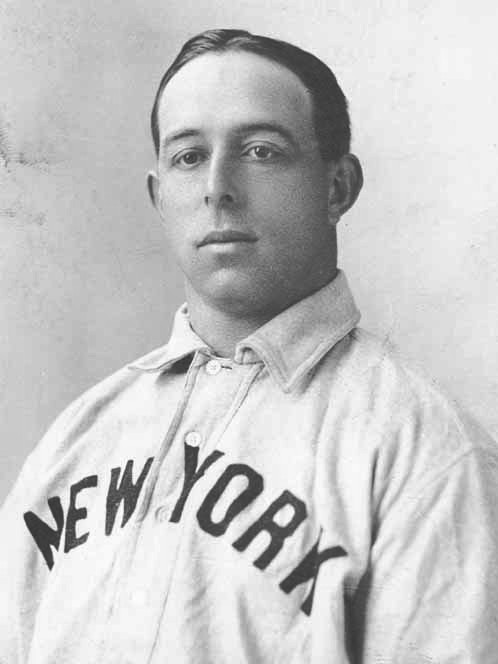
- Outfielder
- Born: August 6, 1872; San Francisco, California, U.S.
- Died: March 11, 1945 (aged 72); Villa Grande, California, U.S.
- Batted: Right Threw: Right

MLB debut
- June 30, 1896, for the Philadelphia Phillies

Last MLB appearance
- September 15, 1906, for the St. Louis Cardinals

MLB statistics
- Batting average: .279
- Home runs: 40
- Runs batted in: 721
- Stolen bases: 396
- Stats at Baseball Reference

Teams
- Philadelphia Phillies (1896); Chicago Orphans (1898–1900); Chicago White Sox (1901–1902); New York Giants (1903–1906); St. Louis Cardinals (1906)

Career highlights and awards
- World Series champion (1905); NL RBI leader (1903)

Samuel Blair Mertes (August 6, 1872 – March 11, 1945) was an American professional baseball player. He was an outfielder over parts of 10 seasons (1896–1906) with the Philadelphia Phillies, Chicago Orphans, Chicago White Sox, New York Giants, and St. Louis Cardinals. Mertes led the National League in doubles and RBIs in 1903 while playing for New York. He was born in San Francisco, California, and died in Villa Grande, California, at the age of 72.

In 10 seasons, Mertes batted .279 (1227-4405) with 40 home runs and 721 RBI. He stole 396 bases in his career. Mertes' on-base percentage was .346 and his slugging percentage was .398. He had 100+ RBI seasons in 1903 and 1905.

Harpo Marx considered Mertes his favorite player, claiming he was the only member of the Giants he could see from his limited view outside the stadium on Coogan's Bluff.

He was a Freemason and a member of Richmond Lodge No. 375, F.&A.M., in San Francisco. After being traded to St. Louis, he said that he had trouble getting along with his teammates on the New York Giants because he was a Mason and many of them were Irish Catholics.

== See also ==
- List of Major League Baseball career triples leaders
- List of Major League Baseball career stolen bases leaders
- List of Major League Baseball annual runs batted in leaders
- List of Major League Baseball annual doubles leaders
- List of Major League Baseball players to hit for the cycle

Achievements
Preceded by Duff Cooley	Hitting for the cycle October 4, 1904	Succeeded by Johnny Bates
