= Dutch Meier =

American baseball player (1879–1948)

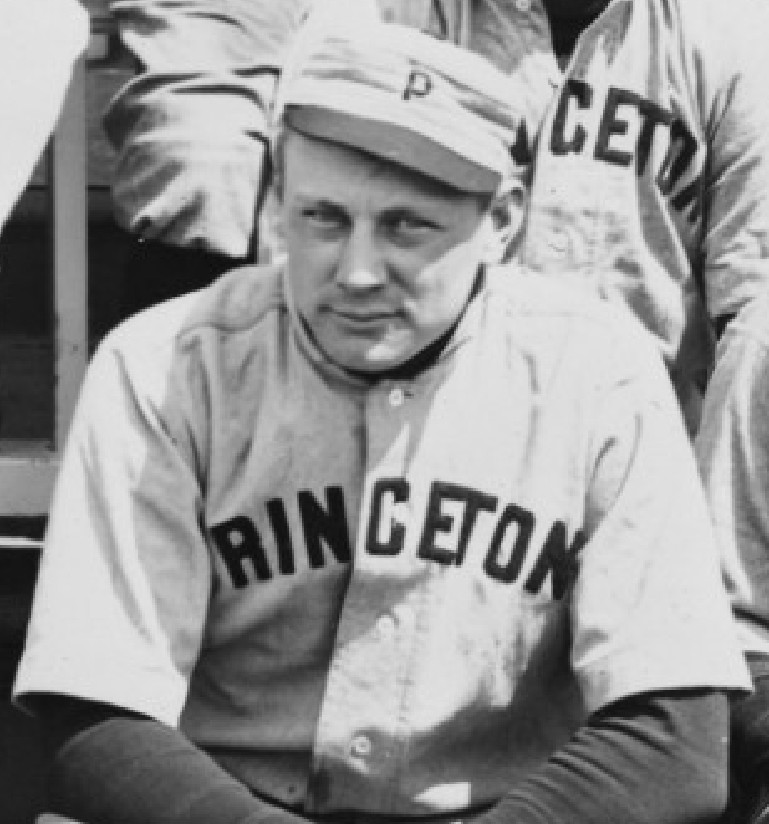
- Outfielder/Shortstop
- Born: March 30, 1879; St. Louis, Missouri, U.S.
- Died: March 23, 1948 (aged 68); Chicago, Illinois, U.S.
- Batted: Right Threw: Right

MLB debut
- April 19, 1906, for the Pittsburgh Pirates

Last MLB appearance
- October 7, 1906, for the Pittsburgh Pirates

MLB statistics
- Batting average: .256
- Home runs: 0
- Hits: 70
- Runs batted in: 16
- Stats at Baseball Reference

Teams
- Pittsburgh Pirates (1906)

Arthur Ernst "Dutch" Meier (March 30, 1879 – March 23, 1948) was a professional baseball player who played for the Pittsburgh Pirates of Major League Baseball in 1906.

Meier played college baseball at Princeton University.

== Sources ==
- Career statistics from Baseball Reference
