= Galestown Cemetery =

Cemetery in Dorchester County, Maryland, US

Coordinates: 38°33′36″N 75°42′55″W

Galestown Cemetery is a cemetery located in Galestown, Maryland. One person of note interred there is Homer Smoot, a one-time professional baseball player.[1]
