= Eddie Tiemeyer =

American baseball player (1885–1946)

- Third baseman / First baseman / Pitcher
- Born: May 9, 1885; Cincinnati, Ohio, US
- Died: September 27, 1946 (aged 61); Cincinnati, Ohio, US
- Batted: Right Threw: Right

MLB debut
- August 19, 1906, for the Cincinnati Reds

Last MLB appearance
- October 1, 1909, for the New York Highlanders

MLB statistics
- Batting average: .263
- Home runs: 0
- Runs batted in: 0
- Earned run average: 0.00
- Stats at Baseball Reference

Teams
- Cincinnati Reds (1906–1907); New York Highlanders (1909)

Edward Carl Tiemeyer (May 9, 1885 – September 27, 1946) was an American Major League Baseball first baseman. He was born on May 9, 1885, in Cincinnati. In 1906–1907, Tiemeyer played for the Cincinnati Reds and in 1909 he played for the New York Highlanders. In his career, Eddie played in 9 games with 5 hits in 19 at-bats. He died on September 27, 1946, in his home town of Cincinnati.
