= Ham Wade =

American baseball player (1879-1968)

- Left fielder
- Born: December 20, 1879; Spring City, Pennsylvania, U.S.
- Died: September 9, 1968 (aged 88); Riverside, New Jersey, U.S.
- Batted: Right Threw: Right

MLB debut
- September 9, 1907, for the New York Giants

Last MLB appearance
- September 9, 1907, for the New York Giants

MLB statistics
- Games played: 1
- On-base percentage: 1.000
- Hit by Pitch: 1
- Stats at Baseball Reference

Teams
- New York Giants (1907)

Abraham Lincoln "Ham" Wade (December 20, 1879 – July 21, 1968) was an American Major League Baseball player. Wade played in one game in the 1907 season with the New York Giants. He was hit by a pitch in his only plate appearance, giving him a perfect OBP of 1.000, and made two putouts as an outfielder, giving him a perfect fielding percentage of 1.000. As of the end of the 2025 season, 5 other players have been hit by a pitch in their only Major League plate appearance: Charlie Faust in 1911, Harvey Grubb in 1912, Cy Malis in 1934, Fred Van Dusen in 1955, and John Rheinecker in 2006.

Wade was born in Spring City, Pennsylvania, and died in Riverside, New Jersey.
