= Alan Storke =

American baseball player (1884–1910)

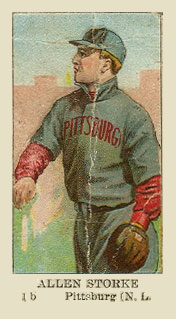
- Infielder
- Born: September 27, 1884; Auburn, New York, U.S.
- Died: March 18, 1910 (aged 25); Newton, Massachusetts, U.S.
- Batted: Right Threw: Right

MLB debut
- September 24, 1906, for the Pittsburgh Pirates

Last MLB appearance
- October 6, 1909, for the St. Louis Cardinals

MLB statistics
- Batting average: .261
- Home runs: 2
- Runs batted in: 74
- Stats at Baseball Reference

Teams
- Pittsburgh Pirates (1906–1909); St. Louis Cardinals (1909)

Alan Marshall Storke (September 27, 1884 – March 18, 1910) was an American professional baseball infielder in Major League Baseball from 1906 through 1909. He played for the St. Louis Cardinals and Pittsburgh Pirates.

Storke died of general streptococcus due to empyema before the 1910 season.

== See also ==
- List of baseball players who died during their careers
