= Forrest Crawford =

American baseball player (1881–1908)

- Shortstop
- Born: May 10, 1881; Rockdale, Texas, U.S.
- Died: March 27, 1908 (aged 26); Austin, Texas, U.S.
- Batted: Left Threw: Right

MLB debut
- July 30, 1906, for the St. Louis Cardinals

Last MLB appearance
- May 17, 1907, for the St. Louis Cardinals

MLB statistics
- Batting average: .210
- Home runs: 0
- Runs batted in: 14
- Stats at Baseball Reference

Teams
- St. Louis Cardinals (1906–1907)

Forrest A. Crawford (May 10, 1881 – March 27, 1908) was an American professional baseball player. He played as a shortstop for the St. Louis Cardinals of the National League during 1906 and 1907.

Crawford suffered a hip injury as a child as a result of a fall down an elevator shaft. The injury did not affect his playing career until before the 1908 season when it became inflamed while he was training at home. Crawford underwent surgery on the hip in March 1908 and died a few days later as a result of complications thereof. He left a widow and daughter.

== See also ==
- List of baseball players who died during their careers
