= Snake Deal =

American baseball player (1879–1944)

- First baseman
- Born: January 21, 1879; Lancaster, Pennsylvania, U.S.
- Died: May 9, 1944 (aged 65); Harrisburg, Pennsylvania, U.S.
- Batted: Right Threw: Right

MLB debut
- July 9, 1906, for the Cincinnati Reds

Last MLB appearance
- October 7, 1906, for the Cincinnati Reds

MLB statistics
- Batting average: .208
- Home runs: 0
- Runs batted in: 21
- Stats at Baseball Reference

Teams
- Cincinnati Reds (1906)

John Wesley "Snake" Deal (January 21, 1879 – May 9, 1944) was an American Major League Baseball (MLB) first baseman and professional basketball player. He played half of one season for the Cincinnati Reds in 1906.

He also played professional basketball as a guard from 1899 to 1919 for various Pennsylvania teams in different leagues. Deal was considered one of the first and best players in the National Basketball League (NBL), the first professional basketball league ever formed. In 1904, he played for the Germantown Pros in matchups against teams like Allentown YMCA; during this period, he was also noted as the captain of the famous Camden team. He is the earliest recorded player to make use of the jump shot.
