= Monty Pfyl =

American baseball player (1886-1945)

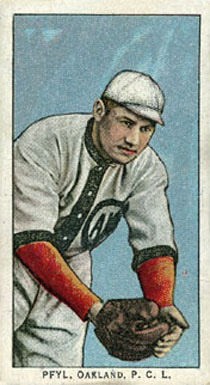
- First baseman
- Born: May 11, 1886; St. Louis, Missouri, U.S.
- Died: October 18, 1945 (aged 59); San Francisco, California, U.S.
- Batted: Left Threw: Left

MLB debut
- July 30, 1907, for the New York Giants

Last MLB appearance
- July 30, 1907, for the New York Giants

MLB statistics
- Games played: 1
- Sacrifice hits: 1
- Stats at Baseball Reference

Teams
- New York Giants (1907)

Meinhard Charles "Monty" Pfyl (May 11, 1886 – October 18, 1945) was an American Major League Baseball first baseman. He played one game for the New York Giants in 1907. In his lone career plate appearance, Pfyl was credited with a sacrifice hit.

== Sources ==
- Career statistics from Baseball Reference · Baseball Reference (Minors) · Retrosheet · Baseball Almanac, Retrosheet
