= Lou Manske =

American baseball player (1884–1963)

- Pitcher
- Born: July 4, 1884; Milwaukee, Wisconsin
- Died: April 27, 1963 (aged 78); Milwaukee, Wisconsin
- Batted: Left Threw: Left

MLB debut
- August 31, 1906, for the Pittsburgh Pirates

Last MLB appearance
- September 7, 1906, for the Pittsburgh Pirates

MLB statistics
- Win–loss record: 0–0
- Earned run average: 5.63
- Strikeouts: 6

Teams
- Pittsburgh Pirates (1906)

Louis Hugo Manske (July 4, 1884 – April 27, 1963) was a pitcher in Major League Baseball.

Manske started his professional baseball career in 1904. From 1905 to 1906, he was a starter for Des Moines of the Western League. He went 20–16 in 1905, and Des Moines won the pennant. The following season, he was 23–10 when he was purchased by the Pittsburgh Pirates in August. He appeared in two major league games for them.

In 1907, Manske was sent down to the American Association. His career ended in 1910.
