= Villa Grande, California =

Unincorporated community in California, United States

- Unincorporated community
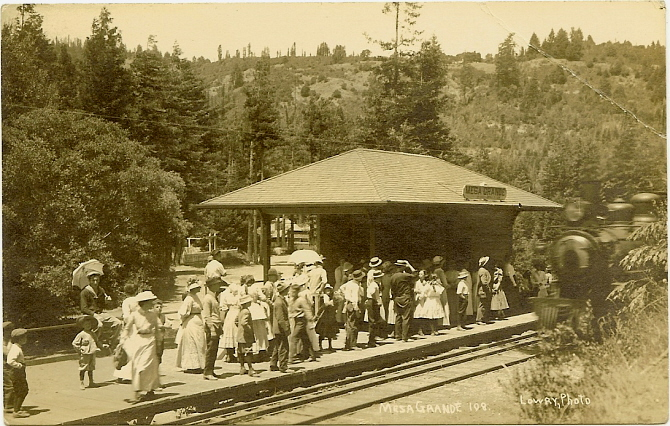
- The historical Mesa Grande station on the Northwestern Pacific Railroad, ca. 1910

- Location within California Location within the United States
- Coordinates: 38°28′23″N 123°01′32″W
- Country: United States
- State: California
- County: Sonoma
- Elevation: 52 ft (16 m)
- Time zone: UTC-8 (Pacific (PST))
  - Summer (DST): UTC-7 (PDT)
- ZIP code: 95486
- Area code: 707
- GNIS feature ID: 1656388

Villa Grande, originally named Mesa Grande is an unincorporated community in Sonoma County, California, United States. Villa Grande is located on the Russian River, 2.5 miles (4.0 km) southwest of Guerneville. Villa Grande has a post office (95486) which was established in 1921.
