= Irv Higginbotham =

American baseball player (1882–1959)

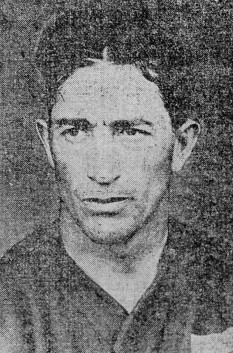
- Higginbotham in 1916
- Pitcher
- Born: April 26, 1882; Blyburg, Nebraska, U.S.
- Died: June 13, 1959 (aged 77); Seattle, Washington, U.S.
- Batted: Right Threw: Right

MLB debut
- August 11, 1906, for the St. Louis Cardinals

Last MLB appearance
- September 11, 1909, for the Chicago Cubs

MLB statistics
- Win–loss record: 10–14
- Earned run average: 2.81
- Strikeouts: 86
- Stats at Baseball Reference

Teams
- St. Louis Cardinals (1906, 1908–1909); Chicago Cubs (1909)

Irving Clinton Higginbotham (April 26, 1882 – June 13, 1959) was an American professional baseball pitcher in Major League Baseball (MLB) from 1906 to 1909. He played for the St. Louis Cardinals and Chicago Cubs.

Higginbotham was born on April 26, 1881, in Blyburg, Nebraska. He made his MLB debut on August 11, 1906, with the St. Louis Cardinals. His professional baseball career ended in 1909. He played for the Monmouth Browns (Illinois-Missouri (minor) League) in 1910.

Later in life, he worked as a painter; he was a member of Painter Union 300 in Seattle. Higginbotham died of a heart ailment in Seattle, Washington on June 13, 1959, and was buried in Acacia Memorial Park in King County, Washington.
