= Tom O'Hara (baseball) =

American baseball player (1880–1954)

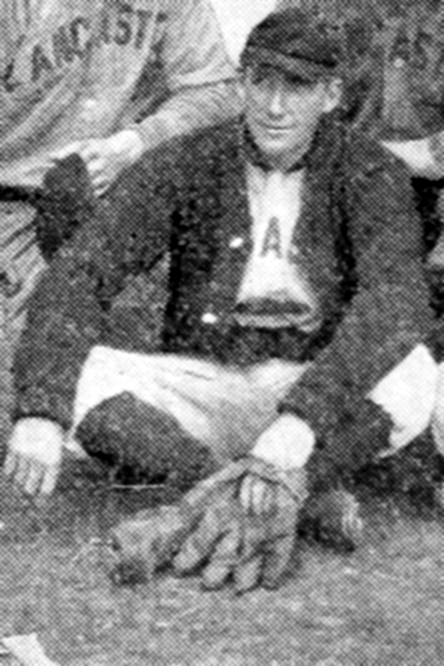
- Outfielder
- Born: July 13, 1880; Waverly, New York, U.S.
- Died: June 8, 1954 (aged 73); Denver, Colorado, U.S.
- Batted: Unknown Threw: Unknown

MLB debut
- September 19, 1906, for the St. Louis Cardinals

Last MLB appearance
- July 4, 1907, for the St. Louis Cardinals

MLB statistics
- Batting average: .252
- Home runs: 0
- Runs batted in: 5
- Stats at Baseball Reference

Teams
- St. Louis Cardinals (1906–1907)

Thomas Francis O'Hara (July 13, 1880 – June 8, 1954) was an American outfielder in Major League Baseball. He played for the St. Louis Cardinals.
