= Galestown, Maryland =

- Town
- Location of Galestown, Maryland
- Coordinates: 38°34′0″N 75°42′56″W
- Country: United States
- State: Maryland
- County: Dorchester
- Incorporated: 1951

Area
  - Total: 0.25 sq mi (0.66 km^{2})
  - Land: 0.24 sq mi (0.61 km^{2})
  - Water: 0.019 sq mi (0.05 km^{2})
- Elevation: 13 ft (4 m)

Population (2020)
  - Total: 111
  - Density: 473.0/sq mi (182.63/km^{2})
- Time zone: UTC-5 (Eastern (EST))
  - Summer (DST): UTC-4 (EDT)
- ZIP code: 21659
- Area codes: 410, 443, and 667
- FIPS code: 24-31250
- GNIS feature ID: 0590271
- Website: https://www.galestown.com/

Galestown is a town in Dorchester County, Maryland, United States. As of the 2020 census, Galestown had a population of 111.

== Geography ==
Galestown is located at 38°34′0″N 75°42′56″W (38.566532, -75.715626).

According to the United States Census Bureau, the town has a total area of 0.26 square miles (0.67 km^{2}), of which 0.24 square miles (0.62 km^{2}) is land and 0.02 square miles (0.05 km^{2}) is water.

== Demographics ==
Historical population
Census	Pop.	Note	%±
1960	151		—
1970	123		−18.5%
1980	142		15.4%
1990	123		−13.4%
2000	101		−17.9%
2010	138		36.6%
2020	111		−19.6%
U.S. Decennial Census

=== 2010 census ===
As of the 2010 census, there were 138 people, 49 households, and 31 families living in the town. The population density was 575.0 inhabitants per square mile (222.0/km^{2}). There were 57 housing units at an average density of 237.5 per square mile (91.7/km^{2}). The racial makeup of the town was 84.8% White, 13.8% African American, and 1.4% from two or more races. Hispanic or Latino of any race were 0.7% of the population.

There were 49 households, of which 38.8% had children under the age of 18 living with them, 36.7% were married couples living together, 20.4% had a female householder with no husband present, 6.1% had a male householder with no wife present, and 36.7% were non-families. 30.6% of all households were made up of individuals, and 16.4% had someone living alone who was 65 years of age or older. The average household size was 2.82 and the average family size was 3.55.

The median age in the town was 33.5 years. 29.7% of residents were under the age of 18; 11.6% were between the ages of 18 and 24; 18% were from 25 to 44; 26.1% were from 45 to 64; and 14.5% were 65 years of age or older. The gender makeup of the town was 46.4% male and 53.6% female.

=== 2000 census ===
As of the census of 2000, there were 101 people, 43 households, and 31 families living in the town. The population density was 476.7 people per square mile (185.7/km^{2}). There were 51 housing units at an average density of 240.7 per square mile (92.9/km^{2}). The racial makeup of the town was 100.00% White. Hispanic or Latino of any race were 0.99% of the population.

There were 43 households, out of which 25.6% had children under the age of 18 living with them, 60.5% were married couples living together, 14.0% had a female householder with no husband present, and 25.6% were non-families. 23.3% of all households were made up of individuals, and 11.6% had someone living alone who was 65 years of age or older. The average household size was 2.35 and the average family size was 2.78.

In the town, the population was spread out, with 24.8% under the age of 18, 5.9% from 18 to 24, 20.8% from 25 to 44, 30.7% from 45 to 64, and 17.8% who were 65 years of age or older. The median age was 42 years. For every 100 females there were 94.2 males. For every 100 females age 18 and over, there were 81.0 males.

The median income for a household in the town was $31,250, and the median income for a family was $37,917. Males had a median income of $24,375 versus $40,250 for females. The per capita income for the town was $18,828. There were no families and 3.3% of the population living below the poverty line, including no under eighteens and 15.4% of those over 64.
