= Tom Walsh (baseball) =

American baseball player (1885–1963)

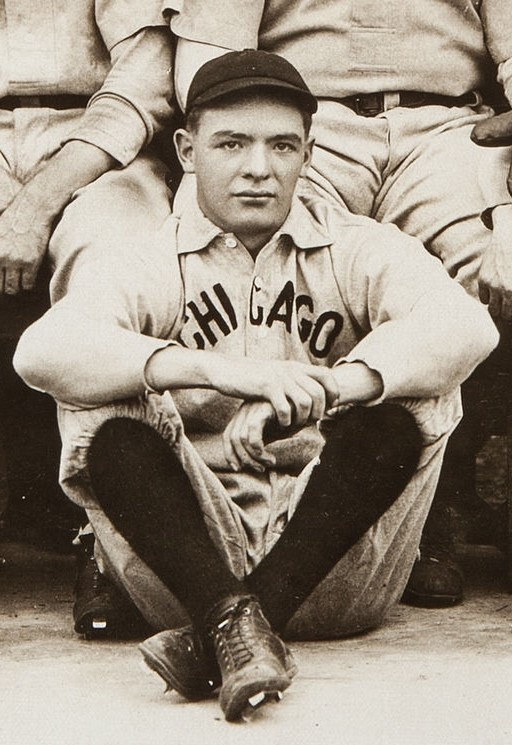
- Walsh in 1906
- Catcher
- Born: February 28, 1885; Davenport, Iowa
- Died: March 16, 1963 (aged 78); Naples, Florida
- Batted: Right Threw: Right

MLB debut
- August 15, 1906, for the Chicago Cubs

Last MLB appearance
- September 26, 1906, for the Chicago Cubs

MLB statistics
- Batting average: .000
- Home runs: 0
- Runs batted in: 0
- Stats at Baseball Reference

Teams
- Chicago Cubs (1906)

Thomas Joseph Walsh (February 28, 1885 – March 16, 1963) was an American Major League Baseball player. He was a catcher who played for the Chicago Cubs in the 1906 season. He was born on February 28, 1885, in Davenport, Iowa. Walsh played two games in his major league career, striking out in his only plate appearance, for a batting average of .000. He was also on the Cubs' 1907 roster and eligible to play in both the 1906 and 1907 World Series, but did not appear in either one.

Walsh died on March 16, 1963, in Naples, Florida.
