= Henry Mathewson =

American baseball player (1886–1917)

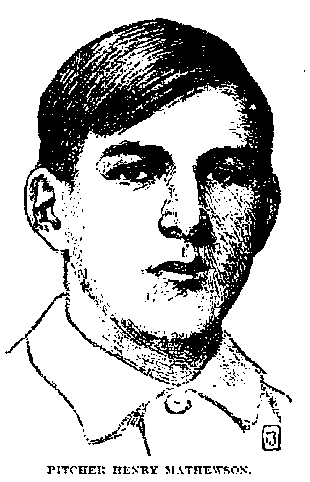
- Pitcher
- Born: December 24, 1886; Factoryville, Pennsylvania, U.S.
- Died: July 1, 1917 (aged 30); Factoryville, Pennsylvania, U.S.
- Batted: Right Threw: Right

MLB debut
- September 28, 1906, for the New York Giants

Last MLB appearance
- May 4, 1907, for the New York Giants

MLB statistics
- Innings pitched: 11
- Earned run average: 4.91
- Saves: 2
- Stats at Baseball Reference

Teams
- New York Giants (1906–07)

Henry Mathewson (December 24, 1886 – July 1, 1917) was an American professional baseball player who appeared in a total of three games with the National League's New York Giants in the 1906 and 1907 seasons. He was a younger brother of Hall of Famer Christy Mathewson. His career was primarily spent pitching semi-professional baseball until his death at the age of 30.

== Early life ==
Henry Mathewson was born on December 24, 1886, as the fourth of six children. Henry was the third of four Mathewson brothers, after older brothers Christy and Cyril (who died as an infant), and before younger brother Nicholas. His father, Gilbert, was a postmaster for the United States Senate, and his mother, Minerva, was a leader of the local Woman's Christian Temperance Union. Minerva was said to be responsible for teaching her sons to throw.

== Major league career ==
Henry was first offered a professional contract by the Chicago Cubs during the spring of 1906; he turned down their offer so that he could join Christy with the New York Giants; by that time, the elder Mathewson had established himself as a star by winning the pitching Triple Crown in 1905. Due to Christy's fame, Henry Mathewson was much written about in the press as the "next Matty" throughout his career.

Despite the hype, Henry did not pitch well in exhibition games. Ultimately, he spent much of 1906 pitching in semi-professional leagues. When his semi-pro season ended in September, Henry was brought up to the major league roster. At nineteen years of age, he was the youngest player in the National League at that time.

Henry's debut in 1906, on September 28, saw him replace his brother, Christy, to finish an 8-2 Giants victory against the St. Louis Cardinals. Henry faced five batters in his inning of work and did not allow a walk or a hit; he was, however, responsible for allowing a run during his time on the mound. He was retroactively credited with a save for his efforts.

On October 5, the final day of the regular season, Henry was given a start against the last place Boston Beaneaters. Facing Big Jeff Pfeffer, Mathewson gave up one run over the first six innings, matching Pfeffer, but struggled over the next three by giving up six runs and lost 7-1. Despite giving up only six hits, compared to Pfeffer's nine, he had major control issues, allowing fourteen walks and also hitting a batter. No National League pitcher has allowed more walks in a single game since 1906. (Note: Two American League pitchers, Boardwalk Brown in 1913 and Bruno Haas in 1915, gave up more in a nine-inning game. Two others from the American League, Skipper Friday in 1923 and Tommy Byrne in 1951 allowed at least fourteen walks in an extra-inning game.)

Manager John McGraw retained Henry for the 1907 season, but his time with the club was short-lived. Appearing on the roster for the first weeks of the year, he made only a single appearance with the big league club. The appearance came on May 4 against the Brooklyn Superbas, where he was called upon to pitch the ninth inning of a game started by Hooks Wiltse, who had limited Brooklyn to two hits. Mathewson allowed a hit and threw a wild pitch, but finished the shutout for the Giants; Mathewson again earned a save for his outing. Eleven days later, the Giants sent Henry to the Wilmington Peaches of the Tri-State League.

== Later life ==
Henry's only documented appearances in the minors, following his time with Wilmington in 1907 (along with a brief stint with the Pottsville team in the unclassified Atlantic League), came in 1909. That year, he split time with two teams, the Columbus Foxes and Savannah Indians of the South Atlantic League, appearing in fourteen games overall. He is documented as having seven hits in forty at-bats combined between the two teams. The younger Mathewson mostly pitched semi-pro baseball after his National League experience until 1915, briefly abandoning pitching in favor of becoming an outfielder for a period of time, and also played on indoor baseball teams during several off-seasons.

In 1916, the younger Mathewson contracted tuberculosis. After a year, Henry died from the disease on June 30, 1917.
