= Matty Fitzgerald =

American baseball player (1880-1949)

- Catcher
- Born: August 31, 1880; Albany, New York, U.S.
- Died: September 22, 1949 (aged 69); Albany, New York, U.S.
- Batted: Right Threw: Right

MLB debut
- September 15, 1906, for the New York Giants

Last MLB appearance
- July 11, 1907, for the New York Giants

MLB statistics
- Batting average: .286
- Home runs: 0
- Runs batted in: 3
- Stats at Baseball Reference

Teams
- New York Giants (1906–1907)

Matthew William Fitzgerald (August 31, 1880 – September 22, 1949) was an American right-handed Major League Baseball player for the New York Giants in 1906 and 1907.

He played most of the 1906 season with the Utica Pent-Ups, hitting .212 in 193 at-bats. On September 15 of that year, he made his big league debut. In his first stint in the majors, he hit .667, collecting four hits in six at-bats and driving in two runs.

In the big leagues in 1907, he had two hits in 15 at-bats for a .133 batting average. He played his final big league game on July 11 of that season. Although his major league career was over, however, his professional career was not. He played 19 games with the Jersey City Skeeters in 1907, hitting .232 in 56 at-bats. With the Skeeters in 1908, he hit .243 in 73 games.

He played for the Providence Grays from 1909 to 1911. In 1909, he hit .223 in 84 games. He hit .236 in 95 games in 1910 and in 1911 he hit .226 in 27 games.

After spending three years in Providence, Fitzgerald spent the rest of his minor league career – which ended in 1915 – with the Troy Trojans. He hit .241 in 96 games in 1912, and in 1913 he hit .210 in 66 games. In 1914, he hit .240 in 73 games and in 1915 he hit .230 in 93 games.

Overall, Fitzgerald hit .286 in 21 big league at-bats. In 10 minor league seasons, he hit .231.

== Post-baseball career ==
Fitzgerald was a member of the first Albany Twilight League commission.

Following his death, he was interred at St. Agnes Cemetery in Menands, New York.
