= Carl Druhot =

American baseball player (1882–1918)

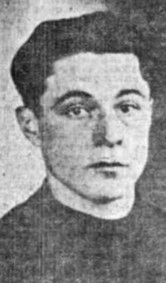
- Pitcher
- Born: September 4, 1882; Archbold, Ohio, U.S.
- Died: February 5, 1918 (aged 35); Portland, Oregon, U.S.
- Batted: Left Threw: Left

MLB debut
- April 18, 1906, for the Cincinnati Reds

Last MLB appearance
- April 22, 1907, for the St. Louis Cardinals

MLB statistics
- Win–loss record: 8–10
- Earned run average: 3.08
- Strikeouts: 60
- Stats at Baseball Reference

Teams
- Cincinnati Reds (1906); St. Louis Cardinals (1906–1907)

Carl A. "Collie" Druhot (September 4, 1882 – February 5, 1918) was an American Major League Baseball pitcher who played for the Cincinnati Reds in 1906 and the St. Louis Cardinals in 1906 and 1907.
