= Admiral Schlei =

American baseball player (1878–1958)

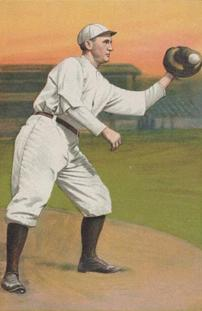
- Catcher
- Born: January 12, 1878; Cincinnati, Ohio, U.S.
- Died: January 24, 1958 (aged 80); Huntington, West Virginia, U.S.
- Batted: Right Threw: Right

MLB debut
- April 24, 1904, for the Cincinnati Reds

Last MLB appearance
- April 24, 1911, for the New York Giants

MLB statistics
- Batting average: .237
- Home runs: 6
- Runs batted in: 209
- Stats at Baseball Reference

Teams
- Cincinnati Reds (1904–1908); New York Giants (1909–1911)

George Henry "Admiral" Schlei (January 12, 1878 - January 24, 1958) was an American Major League Baseball catcher. He played all or part of eight seasons in the majors, between 1904 and 1911, for the Cincinnati Reds and New York Giants. He was a starting catcher from the 1904 to the 1909 season. He was the first Reds catcher to wear shin guards.

Schlei attended St. Xavier High School in Cincinnati.
