= Doc Marshall (catcher) =

American baseball player (1875–1959)

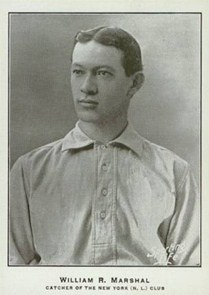
- Catcher
- Born: September 22, 1875; Butler, Pennsylvania, US
- Died: December 11, 1959 (aged 84); Clinton, Illinois, US
- Batted: Right Threw: Right

MLB debut
- April 15, 1904, for the Philadelphia Phillies

Last MLB appearance
- October 7, 1909, for the Brooklyn Superbas

MLB statistics
- Batting average: .210
- Home runs: 2
- Runs batted in: 54
- Stats at Baseball Reference

Teams
- Philadelphia Phillies (1904); New York Giants (1904); Boston Beaneaters (1904); New York Giants (1906); St. Louis Cardinals (1906–1908); Chicago Cubs (1908); Brooklyn Superbas (1909)

William Riddle Marshall (September 22, 1875 – December 11, 1959) was an American professional baseball player who played catcher for several National League clubs from 1904 to 1909. He briefly managed the Chicago Whales during the inaugural Federal League season. After his baseball career, Marshall practiced medicine in rural Illinois for 45 years.

== Formative years ==
Marshall attended college at Grove City College, Slippery Rock University, the University of Pennsylvania and the Chicago College of Medicine and Surgery.

He married Sadie Osborne on November 10, 1898. William and Sadie Marshall were listed in June 1900 as living with their infant daughter Hilda in Homestead, Pennsylvania. Marshall's occupation was listed as "Clerk." Hilda apparently died in infancy: there is no record of her later life, and she is not mentioned in either one of her parents' obituaries.

== Career ==
Marshall began his professional career relatively late in life, at the age of 27 in 1903, with the Des Moines Undertakers of the Western League, after working as a schoolteacher and a clerk. His wife Sadie died in Des Moines during the baseball season.

He made it to the major leagues in 1904, and bounced around the National League during his first season. He made his debut on April 15, 1904 (the second game of the season) for the Philadelphia Phillies. He stayed on their roster for two months, and then played one game in July for the New York Giants. He then played eleven games for the Boston Beaneaters in August before finishing up the season with the Giants. The Giants won the National League pennant that season but no World Series was played.

He spent 1905 in the top level of the minor leagues, with the Minneapolis Millers of the American Association, before returning to the National League in 1906, first with the Giants and then with the Saint Louis Cardinals.

In 1907, while playing for the Cardinals, he led all catchers in assists and errors. He also led the league in runners caught stealing.

During the 1908 season, the last-place Cardinals sold him to the league-leading Chicago Cubs. He was included on the Cubs' 22-man roster for the 1908 World Series but he did not play. The Cubs beat the Detroit Tigers 4 games to 1. The next season, the Cubs sold Marshall to the Brooklyn Superbas, where he served as the backup catcher to Bill Bergen. Bergen set a post-1900 record for futility at the plate by a regular position player which still stands, batting .139 in 112 games. Marshall hit somewhat better in his 50 games, batting .201. This proved to be Marshall's last major league season, although he played four more seasons in the minors.

On October 9, 1909 (two days after his last major league game), Marshall married Alma Bradley, who was from Philadelphia.

He also played with the Des Moines Undertakers of the Western League and the Milwaukee Brewers and St. Paul Saints of the American Association.

During his baseball career, in both the minor and major leagues, Marshall studied medicine part-time, earning his doctorate in 1909. In 1913, after retiring from baseball at the age of 37, he bought the practice of a local doctor in the small town of Clinton, Illinois. He served patients in rural east-central Illinois for 45 years from 1914 to 1959. His brother Dr. E.H. Marshall was his business and professional partner.
