= Ed Karger =

American baseball player (1883–1957)

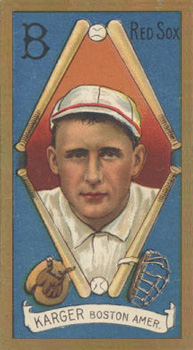
- Pitcher
- Born: May 6, 1883; San Angelo, Texas, U.S.
- Died: September 9, 1957 (aged 74); Delta, Colorado, U.S.
- Batted: Left Threw: Left

MLB debut
- April 15, 1906, for the Pittsburgh Pirates

Last MLB appearance
- September 4, 1911, for the Boston Red Sox

MLB statistics
- Win–loss record: 48–67
- Earned run average: 2.79
- Strikeouts: 415
- Stats at Baseball Reference

Teams
- Pittsburgh Pirates (1906); St. Louis Cardinals (1906–1908); Cincinnati Reds (1909); Boston Red Sox (1909–1911)

Edwin Karger (May 6, 1883 – September 9, 1957) was an American pitcher in Major League Baseball from 1906 to 1911. He played for the Pittsburgh Pirates, St. Louis Cardinals, Cincinnati Reds, and Boston Red Sox. Karger finished his career with a 48–67 win–loss record and a 2.79 earned run average. As a hitter, he was better than average for a pitcher, posting a .220 batting average (88-for-400) with 6 home runs and 35 RBI.

On August 11, 1907, in a game against the Boston Doves, Karger was given credit for a seven inning perfect game.

Karger lived in Alaska in the early 1940s.

== See also ==
- List of St. Louis Cardinals team records
