= Bob Wicker =

American baseball player (1877–1955)

- Pitcher
- Born: May 24, 1878; Bedford, Indiana, U.S.
- Died: January 22, 1955 (aged 76); Evanston, Illinois, U.S.
- Batted: Right Threw: Right

MLB debut
- July 22, 1901, for the St. Louis Cardinals

Last MLB appearance
- September 21, 1906, for the Cincinnati Reds

MLB statistics
- Win–loss record: 64–52
- Earned run average: 2.73
- Strikeouts: 472
- Stats at Baseball Reference

Teams
- St. Louis Cardinals (1901–1903); Chicago Cubs (1903–1906); Cincinnati Reds (1906)

Robert Kitridge Wicker (May 25, 1877 – January 22, 1955) was an American professional baseball player who was a pitcher in the Major Leagues from 1901 to 1906. He would play for the St. Louis Cardinals, Chicago Cubs, and Cincinnati Reds.

Wicker started his professional career in 1900. With Dayton of the Interstate League, he went 21–9. He joined the Cardinals the following season. In early 1903, he was traded to the Cubs, where he won 20 games for the only time in the majors.

Wicker continued to pitch well for the next two years. However, he started off slow in 1906 and was traded to the Reds, thus missing out on the Cubs' pennant win. Wicker then pitched in the minor leagues from 1907 to 1909 before retiring.
