= Pete Noonan =

American baseball player (1881–1965)

- Infielder
- Born: November 24, 1881; West Stockbridge, Massachusetts, U.S.
- Died: February 11, 1965 (aged 83); Great Barrington, Massachusetts, U.S.
- Batted: Right Threw: Right

MLB debut
- June 20, 1904, for the Philadelphia Athletics

Last MLB appearance
- October 6, 1907, for the St. Louis Cardinals

MLB statistics
- Batting average: .205
- Home runs: 4
- Runs batted in: 38
- Stats at Baseball Reference

Teams
- Philadelphia Athletics (1904); Chicago Cubs (1906); St. Louis Cardinals (1906–1907)

Peter John Noonan (November 24, 1881 – February 11, 1965) was an American professional baseball infielder. He played in Major League Baseball (MLB) for the Philadelphia Athletics (1904), Chicago Cubs (1906), and St. Louis Cardinals (1906-1907). He was the head coach of the Wesleyan University baseball team in 1913 and the Manhattan Jaspers baseball team in 1930.
