= Orval Overall =

American baseball player (1881–1947)

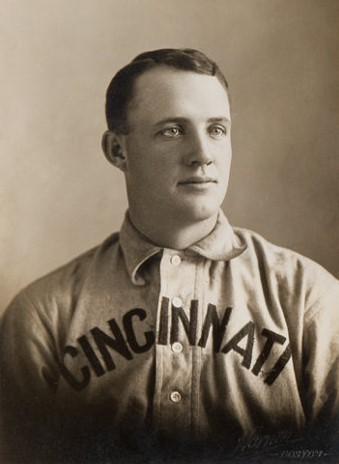
- Pitcher
- Born: February 2, 1881; Farmersville, California, U.S.
- Died: July 14, 1947 (aged 66); Fresno, California, U.S.
- Batted: Both Threw: Right

MLB debut
- April 16, 1905, for the Cincinnati Reds

Last MLB appearance
- July 29, 1913, for the Chicago Cubs

MLB statistics
- Win–loss record: 108–71
- Earned run average: 2.23
- Strikeouts: 935
- Stats at Baseball Reference

Teams
- Cincinnati Reds (1905–1906); Chicago Cubs (1906–1910, 1913)

Career highlights and awards
- 2× World Series champion (1907, 1908); NL strikeout leader (1909); Chicago Cubs Hall of Fame

Orval Overall (February 2, 1881 – July 14, 1947) was an American pitcher in Major League Baseball. He was a member of the Chicago Cubs dynasty of the early 1900s, making eight appearances for the Cubs in the World Series, including five as the starting pitcher (winning three with a tie and a loss).

== Biography ==
Overall was born in Farmersville, California. He attended the University of California, Berkeley, where he was a member of Sigma Nu, serving as director of new member (“pledge”) education, as well as captain of the football team. He was named an All-American in football.

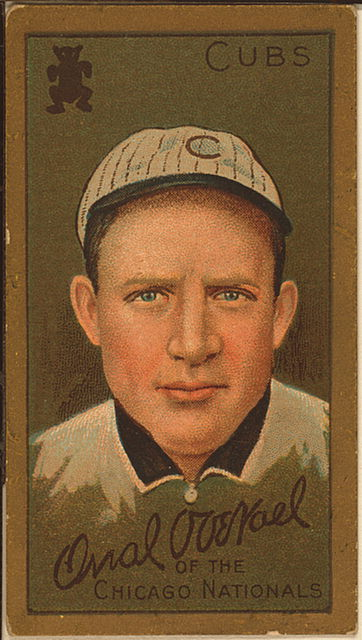
1911 baseball card of Overall

Overall started his professional baseball career in 1904. With the Pacific Coast League's Tacoma Tigers, he pitched 510.2 innings, going 32–25 with a 2.78 earned run average. He was drafted by the Cincinnati Reds in September. In 1905, his rookie season, he was the ace of the Reds pitching staff and won 18 games. He struggled early in 1906, though, and was traded to the Chicago Cubs. In 18 games for Chicago, Overall went 12–3 with a 1.88 ERA. The 1906 Cubs set a major league record for wins in a season and won the National League pennant before losing a crosstown World Series to the White Sox in a major upset.

Overall pitched even better in 1907. He went 23–7 with eight shutouts and a 1.68 ERA. He also won a game in the 1907 World Series, and the Cubs won their first title. In 1908, Overall "slumped" to just 15 wins but also won twice in the 1908 World Series as Chicago repeated as champions. In that Series, Overall set a Cubs record for most strikeouts in a World Series game by a single pitcher (10), which still stands. In the series-clinching game, he shut out the Detroit Tigers on three hits. In the first inning of that game, he became the only pitcher to strike out four hitters in one inning in a World Series game, and the last to do it in a playoff game until 2013. In 1909, he won 20 games and set a career-low in ERA (1.42). He also led the NL in strikeouts, with 205.

Overall retired after the 1910 season. He made a brief comeback in 1913. In total, he played seven years in the major leagues, compiling a record of 108–71 with a 2.23 lifetime ERA. He was the vice-president and manager of a bank after his baseball career ended.

Overall died at the age of 66 in Fresno, California, and was buried at the Inglewood Park Cemetery in Inglewood, California.

== See also ==
- List of Major League Baseball career ERA leaders
- List of Major League Baseball career WHIP leaders
- List of Major League Baseball annual strikeout leaders
- List of Major League Baseball annual shutout leaders
- List of Major League Baseball single-inning strikeout leaders
