= Fred Beebe =

American baseball player (1879–1957)

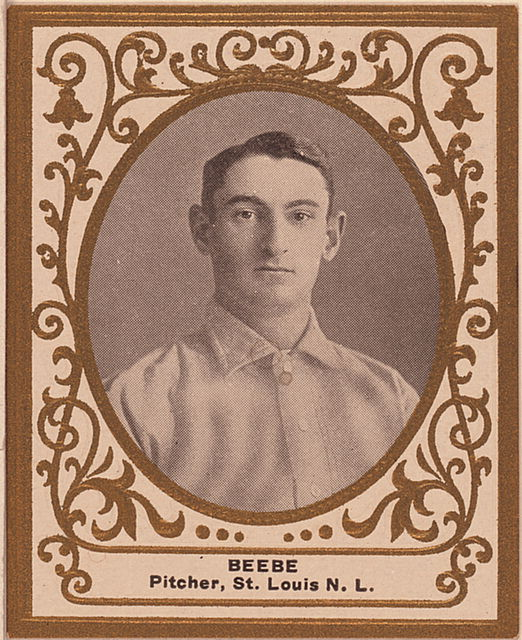
- Pitcher
- Born: December 31, 1879; Lincoln, Nebraska, U.S.
- Died: October 30, 1957 (aged 77); Elgin, Illinois, U.S.
- Batted: Right Threw: Right

MLB debut
- April 17, 1906, for the Chicago Cubs

Last MLB appearance
- September 30, 1916, for the Cleveland Indians

MLB statistics
- Win–loss record: 62–83
- Earned run average: 2.86
- Strikeouts: 634
- Stats at Baseball Reference

Teams
- Chicago Cubs (1906); St. Louis Cardinals (1906–1909); Cincinnati Reds (1910); Philadelphia Phillies (1911); Cleveland Indians (1916)

Career highlights and awards
- NL strikeout leader (1906)

Frederick Leonard Beebe (December 31, 1879 – October 30, 1957) was an American professional baseball player. He played for the Chicago Cubs, St. Louis Cardinals, Cincinnati Reds, Philadelphia Phillies and Cleveland Indians.

== Biography ==
Beebe played baseball for the Hyde Park High School in Chicago and the University of Illinois.

Beebe made his professional debut on April 17, 1906, and played Major League Baseball from 1906 to 1916. In his rookie year, Beebe led the Major Leagues with 171 strikeouts. His career record was 62–83.

After leaving the league, he served as the head coach of the Indiana Hoosiers college baseball team.

== See also ==
- List of Major League Baseball annual strikeout leaders
- List of St. Louis Cardinals team records
