= List of World Series starting pitchers =

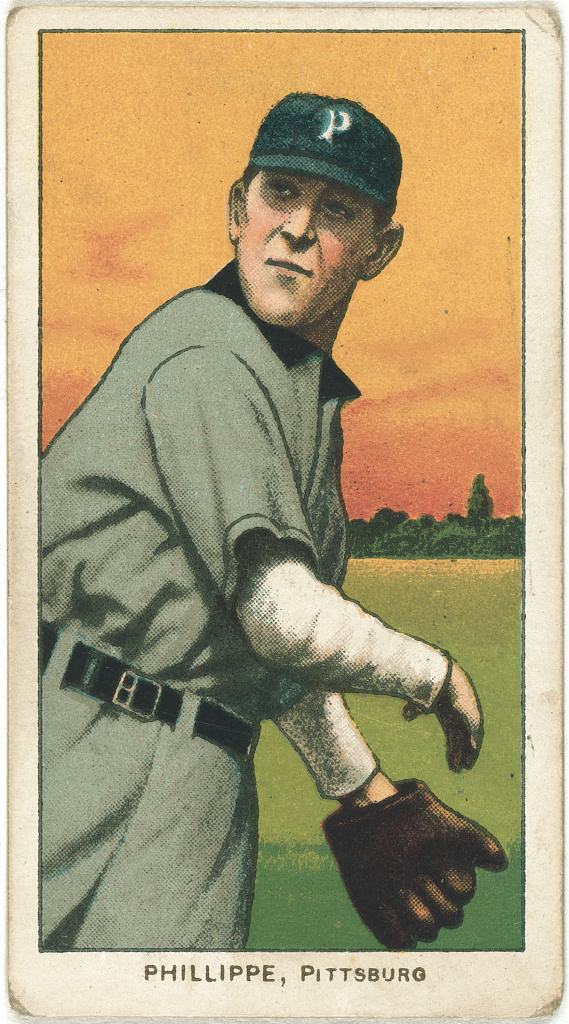
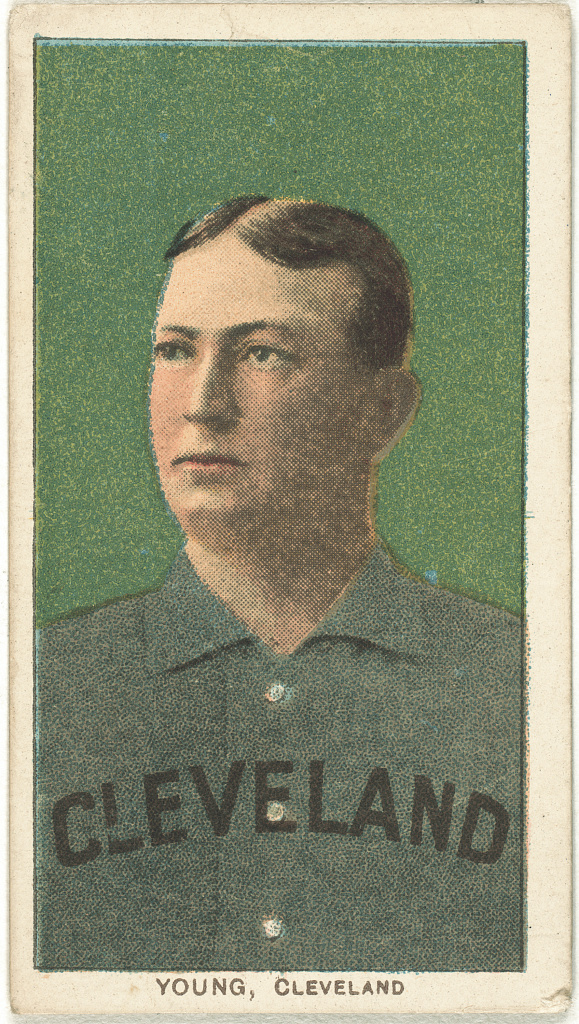
Deacon Phillippe (left) and Cy Young (right) started in the first World Series game.

The following is a chronological list of the starting pitchers for each World Series game contested in Major League Baseball.

Each pitcher's win–loss record for World Series starts, cumulative through the game in question, is listed when the starting pitcher received a win or loss. The absence of a win or loss indicates a no decision. Wins or losses a pitcher received in relief appearances are not included here.

The leader for World Series starts in a career is Whitey Ford, with 22 between 1950 and 1964, all for the New York Yankees. Ford is the leader both in World Series wins by a starting pitcher, with 10, and World Series losses by a starting pitcher, with eight. Christy Mathewson is the career leader in World Series complete games, with 10 during 1905–1913, all for the New York Giants. While complete games were once common in the World Series (the first edition without a complete game was 1959) the most recent World Series complete game win was thrown by Yoshinobu Yamamoto for the Los Angeles Dodgers in 2025. The most recent World Series complete game loss was thrown by Tom Glavine for the Atlanta Braves in 1992.

The record for the most innings pitched in a single World Series start is 14, held by Babe Ruth who won an extra innings complete game for the Boston Red Sox in the 1916 World Series. Facing 48 batters, Ruth allowed one run on six hits while walking three and striking out four. Several starting pitchers have been credited with zero innings pitched, by not recording an out, the most recent being Bob Welch for the Los Angeles Dodgers in the 1981 World Series. Welch faced only four batters, allowing three hits and a walk, and was charged with two runs; his team ultimately won the game.

== List ==
Key
Starting pitcher	The name of the starting pitcher, and if that pitcher was credited with a win or loss (W or L, respectively). The lack of a W or L means the pitcher received a no decision. If the pitcher was credited with a win or loss, it is followed by that pitcher's overall win–loss record in World Series starts, to that point in time. Note: Wins or losses that a pitcher may have received in World Series appearances as a relief pitcher are not including in this table. (Note: For example, Catfish Hunter compiled a 4–3 win–loss record in World Series starts, as noted in the table. He also earned a World Series win in relief, coming in Game 7 of the 1972 World Series, which is not reflected in the table.)
IP	Innings pitched by the starting pitcher; .1 indicates 1/3 of an inning and .2 indicates 2/3 of an inning; A figure in **bold italics** designates a complete game
‡	Denotes a member of the Baseball Hall of Fame

=== 1900s ===
World Series	Game	Game date	Visiting starting pitcher	IP	Home starting pitcher	IP
1903 World Series	Game 1	October 1	Deacon Phillippe, PIT (W, 1–0)	**9**	Cy Young‡, BOS (L, 0–1)	**9**
1903 World Series	Game 2	October 2	Sam Leever, PIT (L, 0–1)	1	Bill Dinneen, BOS (W, 1–0)	**9**
1903 World Series	Game 3	October 3	Deacon Phillippe, PIT (W, 2–0)	**9**	Long Tom Hughes, BOS (L, 0–1)	2
1903 World Series	Game 4	October 6	Bill Dinneen, BOS (L, 1–1)	**8**	Deacon Phillippe, PIT (W, 3–0)	**9**
1903 World Series	Game 5	October 7	Cy Young‡, BOS (W, 1–1)	**9**	Brickyard Kennedy, PIT (L, 0–1)	7
1903 World Series	Game 6	October 8	Bill Dinneen, BOS (W, 2–1)	**9**	Sam Leever, PIT (L, 0–2)	**9**
1903 World Series	Game 7	October 10	Cy Young‡, BOS (W, 2–1)	**9**	Deacon Phillippe, PIT (L, 3–1)	**9**
1903 World Series	Game 8	October 13	Deacon Phillippe, PIT (L, 3–2)	**8**	Bill Dinneen, BOS (W, 3–1)	**9**
1904 World Series			not played			
1905 World Series	Game 1	October 9	Christy Mathewson‡, NYG (W, 1–0)	**9**	Eddie Plank‡, PHA (L, 0–1)	**9**
1905 World Series	Game 2	October 10	Chief Bender‡, PHA (W, 1–0)	**9**	Joe McGinnity‡, NYG (L, 0–1)	8
1905 World Series	Game 3	October 12	Christy Mathewson‡, NYG (W, 2–0)	**9**	Andy Coakley, PHA (L, 0–1)	**9**
1905 World Series	Game 4	October 13	Eddie Plank‡, PHA (L, 0–2)	**8**	Joe McGinnity‡, NYG (W, 1–1)	**9**
1905 World Series	Game 5	October 14	Chief Bender‡, PHA (L, 1–1)	**8**	Christy Mathewson‡, NYG (W, 3–0)	**9**
1906 World Series	Game 1	October 9	Nick Altrock, CWS (W, 1–0)	**9**	Mordecai Brown‡, CHC (L, 0–1)	**9**
1906 World Series	Game 2	October 10	Ed Reulbach, CHC (W, 1–0)	**9**	Doc White, CWS (L, 0–1)	3
1906 World Series	Game 3	October 11	Ed Walsh‡, CWS (W, 1–0)	**9**	Jack Pfiester, CHC (L, 0–1)	**9**
1906 World Series	Game 4	October 12	Mordecai Brown‡, CHC (W, 1–1)	**9**	Nick Altrock, CWS (L, 1–1)	**9**
1906 World Series	Game 5	October 13	Ed Walsh‡, CWS (W, 2–0)	6	Ed Reulbach, CHC	2
1906 World Series	Game 6	October 14	Mordecai Brown‡, CHC (L, 1–2)	1.2	Doc White, CWS (W, 1–1)	**9**
1907 World Series	Game 1	October 8	Wild Bill Donovan, DET	**12**	Orval Overall, CHC	9
1907 World Series	Game 2	October 9	George Mullin, DET (L, 0–1)	**8**	Jack Pfiester, CHC (W, 1–1)	**9**
1907 World Series	Game 3	October 10	Ed Siever, DET (L, 0–1)	4	Ed Reulbach, CHC (W, 2–0)	**9**
1907 World Series	Game 4	October 11	Orval Overall, CHC (W, 1–0)	**9**	Wild Bill Donovan, DET (L, 0–1)	**9**
1907 World Series	Game 5	October 12	Mordecai Brown‡, CHC (W, 2–2)	**9**	George Mullin, DET (L, 0–2)	**9**
1908 World Series	Game 1	October 10	Ed Reulbach, CHC	6.2	Ed Killian, DET	2.1
1908 World Series	Game 2	October 11	Wild Bill Donovan, DET (L, 0–2)	**8**	Orval Overall, CHC (W, 2–0)	**9**
1908 World Series	Game 3	October 12	George Mullin, DET (W, 1–2)	**9**	Jack Pfiester, CHC (L, 1–2)	8
1908 World Series	Game 4	October 13	Mordecai Brown‡, CHC (W, 3–2)	**9**	Ed Summers, DET (L, 0–1)	8
1908 World Series	Game 5	October 14	Orval Overall, CHC (W, 3–0)	**9**	Wild Bill Donovan, DET (L, 0–3)	**9**
1909 World Series	Game 1	October 8	George Mullin, DET (L, 1–3)	**8**	Babe Adams, PIT (W, 1–0)	**9**
1909 World Series	Game 2	October 9	Wild Bill Donovan, DET (W, 1–3)	**9**	Howie Camnitz, PIT (L, 0–1)	2.1
1909 World Series	Game 3	October 11	Nick Maddox, PIT (W, 1–0)	**9**	Ed Summers, DET (L, 0–2)	0.1
1909 World Series	Game 4	October 12	Lefty Leifield, PIT (L, 0–1)	4	George Mullin, DET (W, 2–3)	**9**
1909 World Series	Game 5	October 13	Ed Summers, DET (L, 0–3)	7	Babe Adams, PIT (W, 2–0)	**9**
1909 World Series	Game 6	October 14	Vic Willis‡, PIT (L, 0–1)	5	George Mullin, DET (W, 3–3)	**9**
1909 World Series	Game 7	October 16	Babe Adams, PIT (W, 3–0)	**9**	Wild Bill Donovan, DET (L, 1–4)	3

=== 1910s ===
World Series	Game	Game date	Visiting starting pitcher	IP	Home starting pitcher	IP
1910 World Series	Game 1	October 17	Orval Overall, CHC (L, 3–1)	3	Chief Bender‡, PHA (W, 2–1)	**9**
1910 World Series	Game 2	October 18	Mordecai Brown‡, CHC (L, 3–3)	7	Jack Coombs, PHA (W, 1–0)	**9**
1910 World Series	Game 3	October 20	Jack Coombs, PHA (W, 2–0)	**9**	Ed Reulbach, CHC	2
1910 World Series	Game 4	October 22	Chief Bender‡, PHA (L, 2–2)	**9.2**	King Cole, CHC	8
1910 World Series	Game 5	October 23	Jack Coombs, PHA (W, 3–0)	**9**	Mordecai Brown‡, CHC (L, 3–4)	**9**
1911 World Series	Game 1	October 14	Chief Bender‡, PHA (L, 2–3)	**8**	Christy Mathewson‡, NYG (W, 4–0)	**9**
1911 World Series	Game 2	October 16	Rube Marquard‡, NYG, (L, 0–1)	7	Eddie Plank‡, PHA (W, 1–2)	**9**
1911 World Series	Game 3	October 17	Jack Coombs, PHA (W, 4–0)	**11**	Christy Mathewson‡, NYG (L, 4–1)	**11**
1911 World Series	Game 4	October 24	Christy Mathewson‡, NYG (L, 4–2)	7	Chief Bender‡, PHA (W, 3–3)	**9**
1911 World Series	Game 5	October 25	Jack Coombs, PHA	8	Rube Marquard‡, NYG	3
1911 World Series	Game 6	October 26	Red Ames, NYG (L, 0–1)	4	Chief Bender‡, PHA (W, 4–3)	**9**
1912 World Series	Game 1	October 8	Smoky Joe Wood, BOS (W, 1–0)	**9**	Jeff Tesreau, NYG (L, 0–1)	7
1912 World Series	Game 2	October 9	Christy Mathewson‡, NYG	**11**	Ray Collins, BOS	7.1
1912 World Series	Game 3	October 10	Rube Marquard‡, NYG, (W, 1–1)	**9**	Buck O'Brien, BOS (L, 0–1)	8
1912 World Series	Game 4	October 11	Smoky Joe Wood, BOS (W, 2–0)	**9**	Jeff Tesreau, NYG (L, 0–2)	7
1912 World Series	Game 5	October 11	Christy Mathewson‡, NYG (L, 4–3)	**8**	Hugh Bedient, BOS (W, 1–0)	**9**
1912 World Series	Game 6	October 14	Buck O'Brien, BOS (L, 0–2)	1	Rube Marquard‡, NYG, (W, 2–1)	**9**
1912 World Series	Game 7	October 15	Jeff Tesreau, NYG (W, 1–2)	**9**	Smoky Joe Wood, BOS (L, 2–1)	1
1912 World Series	Game 8	October 16	Christy Mathewson‡, NYG (L, 4–4)	**9.2**	Hugh Bedient, BOS	7
1913 World Series	Game 1	October 7	Chief Bender‡, PHA (W, 5–3)	**9**	Rube Marquard‡, NYG, (L, 2–2)	5
1913 World Series	Game 2	October 8	Christy Mathewson‡, NYG (W, 5–4)	**10**	Eddie Plank‡, PHA (L, 1–3)	**10**
1913 World Series	Game 3	October 9	Bullet Joe Bush, PHA (W, 1–0)	**9**	Jeff Tesreau, NYG (L, 1–3)	6.1
1913 World Series	Game 4	October 10	Al Demaree, NYG (L, 0–1)	4	Chief Bender‡, PHA (W, 6–3)	**9**
1913 World Series	Game 5	October 11	Eddie Plank‡, PHA (W, 2–3)	**9**	Christy Mathewson‡, NYG (L, 5–5)	**9**
1914 World Series	Game 1	October 9	Dick Rudolph, BSN (W, 1–0)	**9**	Chief Bender‡, PHA (L, 6–4)	5.1
1914 World Series	Game 2	October 10	Seattle Bill James, BSN (W, 1–0)	**9**	Eddie Plank‡, PHA (L, 2–4)	**9**
1914 World Series	Game 3	October 12	Bullet Joe Bush, PHA (L, 1–1)	**11**	Lefty Tyler, BSN	10
1914 World Series	Game 4	October 13	Bob Shawkey, PHA (L, 0–1)	5	Dick Rudolph, BSN (W, 2–0)	**9**
1915 World Series	Game 1	October 8	Ernie Shore, BOS (L, 0–1)	**8**	Pete Alexander‡, PHI (W, 1–0)	**9**
1915 World Series	Game 2	October 9	Rube Foster, BOS (W, 1–0)	**9**	Erskine Mayer, PHI (L, 0–1)	**9**
1915 World Series	Game 3	October 11	Pete Alexander‡, PHI (L, 1–1)	**8.2**	Dutch Leonard, BOS (W, 1–0)	**9**
1915 World Series	Game 4	October 12	George Chalmers, PHI (L, 0–1)	**8**	Ernie Shore, BOS (W, 1–1)	**9**
1915 World Series	Game 5	October 13	Rube Foster, BOS (W, 2–0)	**9**	Erskine Mayer, PHI	2.1
1916 World Series	Game 1	October 7	Rube Marquard‡, BKN (L, 2–3)	7	Ernie Shore, BOS (W, 2–1)	8.2
1916 World Series	Game 2	October 9	Sherry Smith, BKN (L, 0–1)	**13.1**	Babe Ruth‡, BOS (W, 1–0)	**14**
1916 World Series	Game 3	October 10	Carl Mays, BOS (L, 0–1)	5	Jack Coombs, BKN (W, 5–0)	6.1
1916 World Series	Game 4	October 11	Dutch Leonard, BOS (W, 2–0)	**9**	Rube Marquard‡, BKN (L, 2–4)	4
1916 World Series	Game 5	October 12	Jeff Pfeffer, BKN (L, 0–1)	7	Ernie Shore, BOS (W, 3–1)	**9**
1917 World Series	Game 1	October 6	Slim Sallee, NYG (L, 0–1)	**8**	Eddie Cicotte, CWS (W, 1–0)	**9**
1917 World Series	Game 2	October 7	Ferdie Schupp, NYG	1.1	Red Faber‡, CWS (W, 1–0)	**9**
1917 World Series	Game 3	October 10	Eddie Cicotte, CWS (L, 1–1)	**8**	Rube Benton, NYG (W, 1–0)	**9**
1917 World Series	Game 4	October 11	Red Faber‡, CWS (L, 1–1)	7	Ferdie Schupp, NYG (W, 1–0)	**9**
1917 World Series	Game 5	October 13	Slim Sallee, NYG (L, 0–2)	7.1	Reb Russell, CWS	0
1917 World Series	Game 6	October 15	Red Faber‡, CWS (W, 2–1)	**9**	Rube Benton, NYG (L, 1–1)	5
1918 World Series	Game 1	September 5	Babe Ruth‡, BOS (W, 2–0)	**9**	Hippo Vaughn, CHC (L, 0–1)	**9**
1918 World Series	Game 2	September 6	Bullet Joe Bush, BOS (L, 1–2)	**8**	Lefty Tyler, CHC (W, 1–0)	**9**
1918 World Series	Game 3	September 7	Carl Mays, BOS (W, 1–1)	**9**	Hippo Vaughn, CHC (L, 0–2)	**9**
1918 World Series	Game 4	September 9	Lefty Tyler, CHC	7	Babe Ruth‡, BOS (W, 3–0)	8
1918 World Series	Game 5	September 10	Hippo Vaughn, CHC (W, 1–2)	**9**	Sad Sam Jones, BOS (L, 0–1)	**9**
1918 World Series	Game 6	September 11	Lefty Tyler, CHC (L, 1–1)	7	Carl Mays, BOS (W, 2–1)	**9**
1919 World Series	Game 1	October 1	Eddie Cicotte, CWS (L, 1–2)	3.2	Dutch Ruether, CIN (W, 1–0)	**9**
1919 World Series	Game 2	October 2	Lefty Williams, CWS (L, 0–1)	**8**	Slim Sallee, CIN (W, 1–2)	**9**
1919 World Series	Game 3	October 3	Ray Fisher, CIN	7	Dickey Kerr, CWS (W, 1–0)	**9**
1919 World Series	Game 4	October 4	Jimmy Ring, CIN (W, 1–0)	**9**	Eddie Cicotte, CWS (L, 1–3)	**9**
1919 World Series	Game 5	October 6	Hod Eller, CIN (W, 1–0)	**9**	Lefty Williams, CWS (L, 0–2)	8
1919 World Series	Game 6	October 7	Dickey Kerr, CWS (W, 2–0)	**10**	Dutch Ruether, CIN	5
1919 World Series	Game 7	October 8	Eddie Cicotte, CWS (W, 2–3)	**9**	Slim Sallee, CIN (L, 1–3)	4.1
1919 World Series	Game 8	October 9	Hod Eller, CIN (W, 2–0)	**9**	Lefty Williams, CWS (L, 0–3)	0.1

=== 1920s ===
World Series	Game	Game date	Visiting starting pitcher	IP	Home starting pitcher	IP
1920 World Series	Game 1	October 5	Stan Coveleski‡, CLE (W, 1–0)	**9**	Rube Marquard‡, BKN (L, 2–5)	6
1920 World Series	Game 2	October 6	Jim Bagby, CLE (L, 0–1)	6	Burleigh Grimes‡, BKN (W, 1–0)	**9**
1920 World Series	Game 3	October 7	Ray Caldwell, CLE (L, 0–1)	0.1	Sherry Smith, BKN (W, 1–1)	**9**
1920 World Series	Game 4	October 9	Stan Coveleski‡, CLE (W, 2–0)	**9**	Leon Cadore, BKN (L, 0–1)	1
1920 World Series	Game 5	October 10	Burleigh Grimes‡, BKN (L, 1–1)	3.1	Jim Bagby, CLE (W, 1–1)	**9**
1920 World Series	Game 6	October 11	Sherry Smith, BKN (L, 1–2)	**8**	Duster Mails, CLE (W, 1–0)	**9**
1920 World Series	Game 7	October 12	Burleigh Grimes‡, BKN (L, 1–2)	7	Stan Coveleski‡, CLE (W, 3–0)	**9**
1921 World Series	Game 1	October 5	Carl Mays, NYY (W, 2–1)	**9**	Phil Douglas, NYG (L, 0–1)	8
1921 World Series	Game 2	October 6	Art Nehf, NYG (L, 0–1)	**8**	Waite Hoyt‡, NYY (W, 1–0)	**9**
1921 World Series	Game 3	October 7	Bob Shawkey, NYY	2.1	Fred Toney, NYG	2
1921 World Series	Game 4	October 9	Phil Douglas, NYG (W, 1–1)	**9**	Carl Mays, NYY (L, 2–2)	**9**
1921 World Series	Game 5	October 10	Waite Hoyt‡, NYY (W, 2–0)	**9**	Art Nehf, NYG (L, 0–2)	**9**
1921 World Series	Game 6	October 11	Fred Toney, NYG	0.2	Harry Harper, NYY	1.1
1921 World Series	Game 7	October 12	Carl Mays, NYY (L, 2–3)	**8**	Phil Douglas, NYG (W, 2–1)	**9**
1921 World Series	Game 8	October 13	Art Nehf, NYG (W, 1–2)	**9**	Waite Hoyt‡, NYY (L, 2–1)	**9**
1922 World Series	Game 1	October 4	Bullet Joe Bush, NYY (L, 1–3)	7	Art Nehf, NYG	7
1922 World Series	Game 2	October 5	Jesse Barnes, NYG	**10**	Bob Shawkey, NYY	**10**
1922 World Series	Game 3	October 6	Waite Hoyt‡, NYY (L, 2–2)	7	Jack Scott, NYG (W, 1–0)	**9**
1922 World Series	Game 4	October 7	Hugh McQuillan, NYG (W, 1–0)	**9**	Carl Mays, NYY (L, 2–4)	8
1922 World Series	Game 5	October 8	Bullet Joe Bush, NYY (L, 1–4)	**8**	Art Nehf, NYG (W, 2–2)	**9**
1923 World Series	Game 1	October 10	Mule Watson, NYG	2	Waite Hoyt‡, NYY	2.1
1923 World Series	Game 2	October 11	Herb Pennock‡, NYY (W, 1–0)	**9**	Hugh McQuillan, NYG (L, 1–1)	3.2
1923 World Series	Game 3	October 12	Art Nehf, NYG (W, 3–2)	**9**	Sad Sam Jones, NYY (L, 0–2)	8
1923 World Series	Game 4	October 13	Bob Shawkey, NYY (W, 1–1)	7.2	Jack Scott, NYG (L, 1–1)	1
1923 World Series	Game 5	October 14	Jack Bentley, NYG (L, 0–1)	1.1	Bullet Joe Bush, NYY (W, 2–4)	**9**
1923 World Series	Game 6	October 15	Herb Pennock‡, NYY (W, 2–0)	**9**	Art Nehf, NYG (L, 3–3)	7.1
1924 World Series	Game 1	October 4	Art Nehf, NYG (W, 4–3)	**12**	Walter Johnson‡, WAS (L, 0–1)	**12**
1924 World Series	Game 2	October 5	Jack Bentley, NYG (L, 0–2)	**8.1**	Tom Zachary, WAS (W, 1–0)	8.2
1924 World Series	Game 3	October 6	Firpo Marberry, WAS (L, 0–1)	3	Hugh McQuillan, NYG (W, 2–1)	3.2
1924 World Series	Game 4	October 7	George Mogridge, WAS (W, 1–0)	7.1	Virgil Barnes, NYG (L, 0–1)	5
1924 World Series	Game 5	October 8	Walter Johnson‡, WAS (L, 0–2)	**8**	Jack Bentley, NYG (W, 1–2)	7.1
1924 World Series	Game 6	October 9	Art Nehf, NYG (L, 4–4)	7	Tom Zachary, WAS (W, 2–0)	**9**
1924 World Series	Game 7	October 9	Virgil Barnes, NYG	7.2	Curly Ogden, WAS	0.1
1925 World Series	Game 1	October 7	Walter Johnson‡, WAS (W, 1–2)	**9**	Lee Meadows, PIT (L, 0–1)	8
1925 World Series	Game 2	October 8	Stan Coveleski‡, WAS (L, 3–1)	**8**	Vic Aldridge, PIT (W, 1–0)	**9**
1925 World Series	Game 3	October 10	Ray Kremer, PIT (L, 0–1)	**8**	Alex Ferguson, WAS (W, 1–0)	7
1925 World Series	Game 4	October 11	Emil Yde, PIT (L, 0–1)	2.1	Walter Johnson‡, WAS (W, 2–2)	**9**
1925 World Series	Game 5	October 12	Vic Aldridge, PIT (W, 2–0)	**9**	Stan Coveleski‡, WAS (L, 3–2)	6.1
1925 World Series	Game 6	October 13	Alex Ferguson, WAS (L, 1–1)	7	Ray Kremer, PIT (W, 1–1)	**9**
1925 World Series	Game 7	October 15	Walter Johnson‡, WAS (L, 2–3)	**8**	Vic Aldridge, PIT	0.1
1926 World Series	Game 1	October 2	Bill Sherdel, STL (L, 0–1)	7	Herb Pennock‡, NYY (W, 3–0)	**9**
1926 World Series	Game 2	October 3	Pete Alexander‡, STL (W, 2–1)	**9**	Urban Shocker, NYY (L, 0–1)	7
1926 World Series	Game 3	October 5	Dutch Ruether, NY (L, 0–1)	4.1	Jesse Haines‡, STL (W, 1–0)	**9**
1926 World Series	Game 4	October 6	Waite Hoyt‡, NYY (W, 3–2)	**9**	Flint Rhem, STL	4
1926 World Series	Game 5	October 7	Herb Pennock‡, NYY (W, 4–0)	**10**	Bill Sherdel, STL (L, 0–2)	**10**
1926 World Series	Game 6	October 9	Pete Alexander‡, STL (W, 3–1)	**9**	Bob Shawkey, NYY (L, 1–2)	6.1
1926 World Series	Game 7	October 10	Jesse Haines‡, STL (W, 2–0)	6.2	Waite Hoyt‡, NYY (L, 3–3)	6
1927 World Series	Game 1	October 5	Waite Hoyt‡, NYY (W, 4–3)	7.1	Ray Kremer, PIT (L, 1–2)	5
1927 World Series	Game 2	October 6	George Pipgras, NYY (W, 1–0)	**9**	Vic Aldridge, PIT (L, 2–1)	7.1
1927 World Series	Game 3	October 7	Lee Meadows, PIT (L, 0–2)	6.1	Herb Pennock‡, NYY (W, 5–0)	**9**
1927 World Series	Game 4	October 8	Carmen Hill, PIT	6	Wilcy Moore, NYY (W, 1–0)	**9**
1928 World Series	Game 1	October 4	Bill Sherdel, STL (L, 0–3)	7	Waite Hoyt‡, NYY (W, 5–3)	**9**
1928 World Series	Game 2	October 5	Pete Alexander‡, STL (L, 3–2)	2.1	George Pipgras, NYY (W, 2–0)	**9**
1928 World Series	Game 3	October 7	Tom Zachary, NYY (W, 3–0)	**9**	Jesse Haines‡, STL (L, 2–1)	6
1928 World Series	Game 4	October 9	Waite Hoyt‡, NYY (W, 6–3)	**9**	Bill Sherdel, STL (L, 0–4)	6.1
1929 World Series	Game 1	October 8	Howard Ehmke, PHA (W, 1–0)	**9**	Charley Root, CHC (L, 0–1)	7
1929 World Series	Game 2	October 9	George Earnshaw, PHA (W, 1–0)	4.2	Pat Malone, CHC (L, 0–1)	3.2
1929 World Series	Game 3	October 11	Guy Bush, CHC (W, 1–0)	**9**	George Earnshaw, PHA (L, 1–1)	**9**
1929 World Series	Game 4	October 12	Charley Root, CHC	6.1	Jack Quinn, PHA	5
1929 World Series	Game 5	October 14	Pat Malone, CHC (L, 0–2)	**8.2**	Howard Ehmke, PHA	3.2

=== 1930s ===
World Series	Game	Game date	Visiting starting pitcher	IP	Home starting pitcher	IP
1930 World Series	Game 1	October 1	Burleigh Grimes‡, STL (L, 1–3)	**8**	Lefty Grove‡, PHA (W, 1–0)	**9**
1930 World Series	Game 2	October 2	Flint Rhem, STL (L, 0–1)	3.1	George Earnshaw, PHA (W, 2–1)	**9**
1930 World Series	Game 3	October 4	Rube Walberg, PHA (L, 0–1)	4.2	Bill Hallahan, STL (W, 1–0)	**9**
1930 World Series	Game 4	October 5	Lefty Grove‡, PHA (L, 1–1)	**8**	Jesse Haines‡, STL (W, 3–1)	**9**
1930 World Series	Game 5	October 6	George Earnshaw, PHA	7	Burleigh Grimes‡, STL (L, 1–4)	**9**
1930 World Series	Game 6	October 8	Bill Hallahan, STL (L, 1–1)	2	George Earnshaw, PHA (W, 3–1)	**9**
1931 World Series	Game 1	October 1	Lefty Grove‡, PHA (W, 2–1)	**9**	Paul Derringer, STL (L, 0–1)	7
1931 World Series	Game 2	October 2	George Earnshaw, PHA (L, 3–2)	**8**	Bill Hallahan, STL (W, 2–1)	**9**
1931 World Series	Game 3	October 5	Burleigh Grimes‡, STL (W, 2–4)	**9**	Lefty Grove‡, PHA (L, 2–2)	8
1931 World Series	Game 4	October 6	Syl Johnson, STL (L, 0–1)	5.2	George Earnshaw, PHA (W, 4–2)	**9**
1931 World Series	Game 5	October 7	Bill Hallahan, STL (W, 3–1)	**9**	Waite Hoyt‡, PHA (L, 6–4)	6
1931 World Series	Game 6	October 9	Lefty Grove‡, PHA (W, 3–2)	**9**	Paul Derringer, STL (L, 0–2)	4.2
1931 World Series	Game 7	October 10	George Earnshaw, PHA (L, 4–3)	7	Burleigh Grimes‡, STL (W, 3–4)	**9**
1932 World Series	Game 1	September 28	Guy Bush, CHC (L, 0–1)	5.1	Red Ruffing‡, NYY (W, 1–0)	**9**
1932 World Series	Game 2	September 29	Lon Warneke, CHC (L, 0–1)	**9**	Lefty Gomez‡, NYY (W, 1–0)	**9**
1932 World Series	Game 3	October 1	George Pipgras, NYY (W, 3–0)	8	Charley Root, CHC (L, 0–2)	4.1
1932 World Series	Game 4	October 2	Johnny Allen, NYY	0.2	Guy Bush, CHC	0.1
1933 World Series	Game 1	October 3	Lefty Stewart, WAS (L, 0–1)	2	Carl Hubbell‡, NYG (W, 1–0)	**9**
1933 World Series	Game 2	October 4	Alvin Crowder, WAS (L, 0–1)	5.2	Hal Schumacher, NYG (W, 1–0)	**9**
1933 World Series	Game 3	October 5	Freddie Fitzsimmons, NYG (L, 0–1)	7	Earl Whitehill, WAS (W, 1–0)	**9**
1933 World Series	Game 4	October 6	Carl Hubbell‡, NYG (W, 2–0)	**11**	Monte Weaver, WAS (L, 0–1)	10.1
1933 World Series	Game 5	October 7	Hal Schumacher, NYG	5.2	Alvin Crowder, WAS	5.1
1934 World Series	Game 1	October 3	Dizzy Dean‡, STL (W, 1–0)	**9**	Alvin Crowder, DET (L, 0–2)	5
1934 World Series	Game 2	October 4	Bill Hallahan, STL	8.1	Schoolboy Rowe, DET (W, 1–0)	**12**
1934 World Series	Game 3	October 5	Tommy Bridges, DET (L, 0–1)	4	Paul Dean, STL (W, 1–0)	**9**
1934 World Series	Game 4	October 6	Elden Auker, DET (W, 1–0)	**9**	Tex Carleton, STL	2.2
1934 World Series	Game 5	October 7	Tommy Bridges, DET (W, 1–1)	**9**	Dizzy Dean‡, STL (L, 1–1)	8
1934 World Series	Game 6	October 8	Paul Dean, STL (W, 2–0)	**9**	Schoolboy Rowe, DET (L, 1–1)	**9**
1934 World Series	Game 7	October 9	Dizzy Dean‡, STL (W, 2–1)	**9**	Elden Auker, DET (L, 1–1)	2.1
1935 World Series	Game 1	October 2	Lon Warneke, CHC (W, 1–1)	**9**	Schoolboy Rowe, DET (L, 1–2)	**9**
1935 World Series	Game 2	October 3	Charley Root, CHC (L, 0–3)	0	Tommy Bridges, DET (W, 2–1)	**9**
1935 World Series	Game 3	October 4	Elden Auker, DET	6	Bill Lee, CHC	7.1
1935 World Series	Game 4	October 4	Alvin Crowder, DET (W, 1–2)	**9**	Tex Carleton, CHC (L, 0–1)	7
1935 World Series	Game 5	October 5	Schoolboy Rowe, DET (L, 1–3)	**9**	Lon Warneke, CHC (W, 2–1)	6
1935 World Series	Game 6	October 7	Larry French, CHC (L, 0–1)	**8.2**	Tommy Bridges, DET (W, 3–1)	**9**
1936 World Series	Game 1	September 30	Red Ruffing‡, NYY (L, 1–1)	**8**	Carl Hubbell‡, NYG (W, 3–0)	**9**
1936 World Series	Game 2	October 2	Lefty Gomez‡, NYY (W, 2–0)	**9**	Hal Schumacher, NYG (L, 1–1)	2
1936 World Series	Game 3	October 3	Freddie Fitzsimmons, NYG (L, 0–2)	**8**	Bump Hadley, NYY (W, 1–0)	8
1936 World Series	Game 4	October 4	Carl Hubbell‡, NYG (L, 3–1)	7	Monte Pearson, NYY (W, 1–0)	**9**
1936 World Series	Game 5	October 5	Hal Schumacher, NYG (W, 2–1)	**10**	Red Ruffing‡, NYY	6
1936 World Series	Game 6	October 6	Lefty Gomez‡, NYY (W, 3–0)	6.1	Freddie Fitzsimmons, NYG (L, 0–3)	3.2
1937 World Series	Game 1	October 6	Carl Hubbell‡, NYG (L, 3–2)	5.1	Lefty Gomez‡, NYY (W, 4–0)	**9**
1937 World Series	Game 2	October 7	Cliff Melton, NYG (L, 0–1)	4	Red Ruffing‡, NYY (W, 2–1)	**9**
1937 World Series	Game 3	October 8	Monte Pearson, NYY (W, 2–0)	8.2	Hal Schumacher, NYG (L, 2–2)	6
1937 World Series	Game 4	October 9	Bump Hadley, NYY (L, 1–1)	1.1	Carl Hubbell‡, NYG (W, 4–2)	**9**
1937 World Series	Game 5	October 10	Lefty Gomez‡, NYY (W, 5–0)	**9**	Cliff Melton, NYG (L, 0–2)	5
1938 World Series	Game 1	October 5	Red Ruffing‡, NYY (W, 3–1)	**9**	Bill Lee, CHC (L, 0–1)	8
1938 World Series	Game 2	October 6	Lefty Gomez‡, NYY (W, 6–0)	7	Dizzy Dean‡, CHC (L, 2–2)	8
1938 World Series	Game 3	October 8	Clay Bryant, CHC (L, 0–1)	5.1	Monte Pearson, NYY (W, 3–0)	**9**
1938 World Series	Game 4	October 9	Bill Lee, CHC (L, 0–2)	3	Red Ruffing‡, NYY (W, 3–1)	**9**
1939 World Series	Game 1	October 4	Paul Derringer, CIN (L, 0–3)	**8.1**	Red Ruffing‡, NYY (W, 4–1)	**9**
1939 World Series	Game 2	October 5	Bucky Walters, CIN (L, 0–1)	**8**	Monte Pearson, NYY (W, 4–0)	**9**
1939 World Series	Game 3	October 7	Lefty Gomez‡, NYY	1	Junior Thompson, CIN (L, 0–1)	4.2
1939 World Series	Game 4	October 8	Oral Hildebrand, NYY	4	Paul Derringer, CIN	7

=== 1940s ===
World Series	Game	Game date	Visiting starting pitcher	IP	Home starting pitcher	IP
1940 World Series	Game 1	October 2	Bobo Newsom, DET (W, 1–0)	**9**	Paul Derringer, CIN (L, 0–4)	1.1
1940 World Series	Game 2	October 3	Schoolboy Rowe, DET (L, 1–4)	3.1	Bucky Walters, CIN (W, 1–1)	**9**
1940 World Series	Game 3	October 4	Jim Turner, CIN (L, 0–1)	6	Tommy Bridges, DET (W, 4–1)	**9**
1940 World Series	Game 4	October 5	Paul Derringer, CIN (W, 1–4)	**9**	Dizzy Trout, DET (L, 0–1)	2
1940 World Series	Game 5	October 6	Junior Thompson, CIN (L, 0–2)	3.1	Bobo Newsom, DET (W, 2–0)	**9**
1940 World Series	Game 6	October 7	Schoolboy Rowe, DET (L, 1–5)	0.1	Bucky Walters, CIN (W, 2–1)	**9**
1940 World Series	Game 7	October 8	Bobo Newsom, DET (L, 2–1)	**8**	Paul Derringer, CIN (W, 2–4)	**9**
1941 World Series	Game 1	October 1	Curt Davis, BKN (L, 0–1)	5.1	Red Ruffing‡, NYY (W, 5–1)	**9**
1941 World Series	Game 2	October 2	Whit Wyatt, BKN (W, 1–0)	**9**	Spud Chandler, NYY (L, 0–1)	5
1941 World Series	Game 3	October 4	Marius Russo, NYY (W, 1–0)	**9**	Freddie Fitzsimmons, BKN	7
1941 World Series	Game 4	October 5	Atley Donald, NYY	4	Kirby Higbe, BKN	3.2
1941 World Series	Game 5	October 6	Tiny Bonham, NYY (W, 1–0)	**9**	Whit Wyatt, BKN (L, 0–1)	**9**
1942 World Series	Game 1	September 30	Red Ruffing‡, NYY (W, 6–1)	8.2	Mort Cooper, STL (L, 0–1)	7.2
1942 World Series	Game 2	October 1	Tiny Bonham, NYY (L, 1–1)	**8**	Johnny Beazley, STL (W, 1–0)	**9**
1942 World Series	Game 3	October 3	Ernie White, STL (W, 1–0)	**9**	Spud Chandler, NYY (L, 0–2)	8
1942 World Series	Game 4	October 4	Mort Cooper, STL	5.1	Hank Borowy, NYY	3
1942 World Series	Game 5	October 5	Johnny Beazley, STL (W, 2–0)	**9**	Red Ruffing‡, NYY (L, 6–2)	**9**
1943 World Series	Game 1	October 5	Max Lanier, STL (L, 0–1)	7	Spud Chandler, NYY (W, 1–2)	**9**
1943 World Series	Game 2	October 6	Mort Cooper, STL (W, 1–1)	**9**	Tiny Bonham, NYY (L, 1–2)	8
1943 World Series	Game 3	October 7	Al Brazle, STL (L, 0–1)	7.1	Hank Borowy, NYY (W, 1–0)	8
1943 World Series	Game 4	October 10	Marius Russo, NYY (W, 2–0)	**9**	Max Lanier, STL	7
1943 World Series	Game 5	October 11	Spud Chandler, NYY (W, 2–2)	**9**	Mort Cooper, STL (L, 1–2)	7
1944 World Series	Game 1	October 4	Denny Galehouse, SLB (W, 1–0)	**9**	Mort Cooper, STL (L, 1–3)	**9**
1944 World Series	Game 2	October 5	Nels Potter, SLB	6	Max Lanier, STL	7
1944 World Series	Game 3	October 6	Ted Wilks, STL (L, 0–1)	2.2	Jack Kramer, SLB (W, 1–0)	**9**
1944 World Series	Game 4	October 7	Harry Brecheen, STL (W, 1–0)	**9**	Sig Jakucki, SLB (L, 0–1)	3
1944 World Series	Game 5	October 8	Mort Cooper, STL (W, 2–3)	**9**	Denny Galehouse, SLB (L, 1–1)	**9**
1944 World Series	Game 6	October 9	Nels Potter, SLB (L, 0–1)	3.2	Max Lanier, STL (W, 1–1)	5.1
1945 World Series	Game 1	October 3	Hank Borowy, CHC (W, 2–0)	**9**	Hal Newhouser‡, DET (L, 0–1)	2.2
1945 World Series	Game 2	October 4	Hank Wyse, CHC (L, 0–1)	6	Virgil Trucks, DET (W, 1–0)	**9**
1945 World Series	Game 3	October 5	Claude Passeau, CHC (W, 1–0)	**9**	Stubby Overmire, DET (L, 0–1)	6
1945 World Series	Game 4	October 6	Dizzy Trout, DET (W, 1–1)	**9**	Ray Prim, CHC (L, 0–1)	3.1
1945 World Series	Game 5	October 7	Hal Newhouser‡, DET (W, 1–1)	**9**	Hank Borowy, CHC (L, 2–1)	5
1945 World Series	Game 6	October 8	Virgil Trucks, DET	4.1	Claude Passeau, CHC	6.2
1945 World Series	Game 7	October 10	Hal Newhouser‡, DET (W, 2–1)	**9**	Hank Borowy, CHC (L, 2–2)	0
1946 World Series	Game 1	October 6	Tex Hughson, BOS	8	Howie Pollet, STL (L, 0–1)	**10**
1946 World Series	Game 2	October 7	Mickey Harris, BOS (L, 0–1)	7	Harry Brecheen, STL (W, 2–0)	**9**
1946 World Series	Game 3	October 9	Murry Dickson, STL (L, 0–1)	7	Dave Ferriss, BOS (W, 1–0)	**9**
1946 World Series	Game 4	October 10	Red Munger, STL (W, 1–0)	**9**	Tex Hughson, BOS (L, 0–1)	2
1946 World Series	Game 5	October 11	Howie Pollet, STL	0.1	Joe Dobson, BOS (W, 1–0)	**9**
1946 World Series	Game 6	October 13	Mickey Harris, BOS (L, 0–2)	2.2	Harry Brecheen, STL (W, 3–0)	**9**
1946 World Series	Game 7	October 15	Dave Ferriss, BOS	4.1	Murry Dickson, STL	7
1947 World Series	Game 1	September 30	Ralph Branca, BKN (L, 0–1)	4	Spec Shea, NYY (W, 1–0)	5
1947 World Series	Game 2	October 1	Vic Lombardi, BKN (L, 0–1)	4	Allie Reynolds, NYY (W, 1–0)	**9**
1947 World Series	Game 3	October 2	Bobo Newsom, NYY (L, 2–2)	1.2	Joe Hatten, BKN	4.1
1947 World Series	Game 4	October 3	Bill Bevens, NYY (L, 0–1)	**8.2**	Harry Taylor, BKN	0
1947 World Series	Game 5	October 4	Spec Shea, NYY (W, 2–0)	**9**	Rex Barney, BKN (L, 0–1)	4.2
1947 World Series	Game 6	October 5	Vic Lombardi, BKN	2.2	Allie Reynolds, NYY	2.1
1947 World Series	Game 7	October 6	Hal Gregg, BKN (L, 0–1)	3.2	Spec Shea, NYY	1.1
1948 World Series	Game 1	October 6	Bob Feller‡, CLE (L, 0–1)	**8**	Johnny Sain, BSN (W, 1–0)	**9**
1948 World Series	Game 2	October 7	Bob Lemon‡, CLE (W, 1–0)	**9**	Warren Spahn‡, BSN (L, 0–1)	4.1
1948 World Series	Game 3	October 8	Vern Bickford, BSN (L, 0–1)	3.1	Gene Bearden, CLE (W, 1–0)	**9**
1948 World Series	Game 4	October 9	Johnny Sain, BSN (L, 1–1)	**8**	Steve Gromek, CLE (W, 1–0)	**9**
1948 World Series	Game 5	October 10	Nels Potter, BSN	3.1	Bob Feller‡, CLE (L, 0–2)	6.1
1948 World Series	Game 6	October 11	Bob Lemon‡, CLE (W, 2–0)	7.1	Bill Voiselle, BSN (L, 0–1)	7
1949 World Series	Game 1	October 5	Don Newcombe, BKN, (L, 0–1)	**8**	Allie Reynolds, NYY (W, 2–0)	**9**
1949 World Series	Game 2	October 6	Preacher Roe, BKN (W, 1–0)	**9**	Vic Raschi, NYY (L, 0–1)	8
1949 World Series	Game 3	October 7	Tommy Byrne, NYY	3.1	Ralph Branca, BKN (L, 0–2)	8.2
1949 World Series	Game 4	October 8	Ed Lopat, NYY (W, 1–0)	5.2	Don Newcombe, BKN, (L, 0–2)	3.2
1949 World Series	Game 5	October 9	Vic Raschi, NYY (W, 1–1)	6.2	Rex Barney, BKN (L, 0–1)	2.2

=== 1950s ===
World Series	Game	Game date	Visiting starting pitcher	IP	Home starting pitcher	IP
1950 World Series	Game 1	October 4	Vic Raschi, NYY (W, 2–1)	**9**	Jim Konstanty, PHI (L, 0–1)	8
1950 World Series	Game 2	October 5	Allie Reynolds, NYY (W, 3–0)	**10**	Robin Roberts‡, PHI (W, 1–0)	**10**
1950 World Series	Game 3	October 6	Ken Heintzelman, PHI	7.2	Ed Lopat, NYY	8
1950 World Series	Game 4	October 7	Bob Miller, PHI (L, 0–1)	0.1	Whitey Ford‡, NYY (W, 1–0)	8.2
1951 World Series	Game 1	October 4	Dave Koslo, NYG (W, 1–0)	**9**	Allie Reynolds, NYY (L, 3–1)	6
1951 World Series	Game 2	October 5	Larry Jansen, NYG (L, 0–1)	6	Ed Lopat, NYY (W, 2–0)	**9**
1951 World Series	Game 3	October 6	Vic Raschi, NYY (L, 2–2)	4.1	Jim Hearn, NYG (W, 1–0)	7.2
1951 World Series	Game 4	October 8	Allie Reynolds, NYY (W, 4–1)	**9**	Sal Maglie, NYG (L, 0–1)	5
1951 World Series	Game 5	October 9	Ed Lopat, NYY (W, 3–0)	**9**	Larry Jansen, NYG (L, 0–2)	3
1951 World Series	Game 6	October 10	Dave Koslo, NYG (L, 1–1)	6	Vic Raschi, NYY (W, 3–2)	6
1952 World Series	Game 1	October 1	Allie Reynolds, NYY (L, 4–2)	7	Joe Black, BKN (W, 1–0)	**9**
1952 World Series	Game 2	October 2	Vic Raschi, NYY (W, 4–2)	**9**	Carl Erskine, BKN (L, 0–1)	5
1952 World Series	Game 3	October 3	Preacher Roe, BKN (W, 2–0)	**9**	Ed Lopat, NYY (L, 3–1)	8.1
1952 World Series	Game 4	October 3	Joe Black, BKN (L, 1–1)	7	Allie Reynolds, NYY (W, 5–2)	**9**
1952 World Series	Game 5	October 5	Carl Erskine, BKN (W, 1–1)	**11**	Ewell Blackwell, NYY	5
1952 World Series	Game 6	October 6	Vic Raschi, NYY (W, 5–2)	7.2	Billy Loes, BKN (L, 0–1)	8.1
1952 World Series	Game 7	October 6	Ed Lopat, NYY	3	Joe Black, BKN (L, 1–2)	5.1
1953 World Series	Game 1	September 30	Carl Erskine, BKN	1	Allie Reynolds, NYY	5.1
1953 World Series	Game 2	October 1	Preacher Roe, BKN (L, 2–1)	**8**	Ed Lopat, NYY (W, 4–1)	**9**
1953 World Series	Game 3	October 2	Vic Raschi, NYY (L, 5–3)	**8**	Carl Erskine, BKN (W, 2–1)	**9**
1953 World Series	Game 4	October 3	Whitey Ford‡, NYY (L, 1–1)	1	Billy Loes, BKN (W, 1–1)	8
1953 World Series	Game 5	October 4	Jim McDonald, NYY (W, 1–0)	7.2	Johnny Podres, BKN (L, 0–1)	2.2
1953 World Series	Game 6	October 5	Carl Erskine, BKN	4	Whitey Ford‡, NYY	7
1954 World Series	Game 1	September 29	Bob Lemon‡, CLE (L, 2–1)	**9.1**	Sal Maglie, NYG	7
1954 World Series	Game 2	September 30	Early Wynn‡, CLE (L, 0–1)	7	Johnny Antonelli, NYG (W, 1–0)	**9**
1954 World Series	Game 3	October 1	Rubén Gómez, NYG (W, 1–0)	7.1	Mike Garcia, CLE (L, 0–1)	3
1954 World Series	Game 4	October 2	Don Liddle, NYG (W, 1–0)	6.2	Bob Lemon‡, CLE (L, 2–2)	4
1955 World Series	Game 1	September 28	Don Newcombe, BKN, (L, 0–3)	5.2	Whitey Ford‡, NYY (W, 2–1)	8
1955 World Series	Game 2	September 29	Billy Loes, BKN (L, 1–2)	3.2	Tommy Byrne, NYY (W, 1–0)	**9**
1955 World Series	Game 3	September 30	Bob Turley, NYY (L, 0–1)	1.1	Johnny Podres, BKN (W, 1–1)	**9**
1955 World Series	Game 4	October 1	Don Larsen, NYY (L, 0–1)	4	Carl Erskine, BKN	3
1955 World Series	Game 5	October 2	Bob Grim, NYY (L, 0–1)	6	Roger Craig, BKN (W, 1–0)	6
1955 World Series	Game 6	October 3	Karl Spooner, BKN (L, 0–1)	0.1	Whitey Ford‡, NYY (W, 3–1)	**9**
1955 World Series	Game 7	October 4	Johnny Podres, BKN (W, 2–1)	**9**	Tommy Byrne, NYY (L, 1–1)	5.1
1956 World Series	Game 1	October 3	Whitey Ford‡, NYY (L, 3–2)	3	Sal Maglie, BKN (W, 1–1)	**9**
1956 World Series	Game 2	October 5	Don Larsen, NYY	1.2	Don Newcombe, BKN	1.2
1956 World Series	Game 3	October 6	Roger Craig, BKN (L, 1–1)	6	Whitey Ford‡, NYY (W, 4–2)	**9**
1956 World Series	Game 4	October 7	Carl Erskine, BKN (L, 2–2)	4	Tom Sturdivant, NYY (W, 1–0)	**9**
1956 World Series	Game 5	October 8	Sal Maglie, BKN (L, 1–2)	**8**	Don Larsen, NYY (W, 1–1)	**9**
1956 World Series	Game 6	October 9	Bob Turley, NYY (L, 0–2)	**9.2**	Clem Labine, BKN (W, 1–0)	**10**
1956 World Series	Game 7	October 10	Johnny Kucks, NYY (W, 1–0)	**9**	Don Newcombe, BKN, (L, 0–4)	3
1957 World Series	Game 1	October 2	Warren Spahn‡, MLN (L, 0–2)	5.1	Whitey Ford‡, NYY (W, 5–2)	**9**
1957 World Series	Game 2	October 3	Lew Burdette, MLN (W, 1–0)	**9**	Bobby Shantz, NYY (L, 0–1)	3
1957 World Series	Game 3	October 5	Bob Turley, NYY	1.2	Bob Buhl, MLN	0.2
1957 World Series	Game 4	October 6	Tom Sturdivant, NYY	4	Warren Spahn‡, MLN (W, 1–2)	**10**
1957 World Series	Game 5	October 7	Whitey Ford‡, NYY (L, 5–3)	7	Lew Burdette, MLN (W, 2–0)	**9**
1957 World Series	Game 6	October 9	Bob Buhl, MLN	2.2	Bob Turley, NYY (W, 1–2)	**9**
1957 World Series	Game 7	October 10	Lew Burdette, MLN (W, 3–0)	**9**	Don Larsen, NYY (L, 1–2)	2.1
1958 World Series	Game 1	October 1	Whitey Ford‡, NYY	7	Warren Spahn‡, MLN (W, 2–2)	**10**
1958 World Series	Game 2	October 2	Bob Turley, NYY (L, 1–3)	0.1	Lew Burdette, MLN (W, 4–0)	**9**
1958 World Series	Game 3	October 4	Bob Rush, MLN (L, 0–1)	7	Don Larsen, NYY (W, 2–2)	7
1958 World Series	Game 4	October 5	Warren Spahn‡, MLN (W, 3–2)	**9**	Whitey Ford‡, NYY (L, 5–4)	7
1958 World Series	Game 5	October 6	Lew Burdette, MLN (L, 4–1)	5.1	Bob Turley, NYY (W, 2–3)	**9**
1958 World Series	Game 6	October 8	Whitey Ford‡, NYY	1.1	Warren Spahn‡, MLN (L, 3–3)	9.2
1958 World Series	Game 7	October 9	Don Larsen, NYY	2.1	Lew Burdette, MLN (L, 4–2)	8
1959 World Series	Game 1	October 1	Roger Craig, LAD (L, 1–2)	2.1	Early Wynn‡, CWS (W, 1–1)	7
1959 World Series	Game 2	October 2	Johnny Podres, LAD (W, 3–1)	6	Bob Shaw, CWS (L, 0–1)	6.2
1959 World Series	Game 3	October 4	Dick Donovan, CWS (L, 0–1)	6.2	Don Drysdale‡, LAD (W, 1–0)	7
1959 World Series	Game 4	October 5	Early Wynn‡, CWS	2.2	Roger Craig, LAD	7
1959 World Series	Game 5	October 6	Bob Shaw, CWS (W, 1–1)	7.1	Sandy Koufax‡, LAD (L, 0–1)	7
1959 World Series	Game 6	October 8	Johnny Podres, LAD	3.1	Early Wynn‡, CWS	3.1

=== 1960s ===
World Series	Game	Game date	Visiting starting pitcher	IP	Home starting pitcher	IP
1960 World Series	Game 1	October 5	Art Ditmar, NYY (L, 0–1)	0.1	Vern Law, PIT (W, 1–0)	7
1960 World Series	Game 2	October 6	Bob Turley, NYY (W, 3–3)	8.1	Bob Friend, PIT (L, 0–1)	4
1960 World Series	Game 3	October 8	Wilmer Mizell, PIT (L, 0–1)	0.1	Whitey Ford‡, NYY (W, 6–4)	**9**
1960 World Series	Game 4	October 8	Vern Law, PIT (W, 2–0)	6.1	Ralph Terry, NYY (L, 0–1)	6.1
1960 World Series	Game 5	October 10	Harvey Haddix, PIT (W, 1–0)	6.1	Art Ditmar, NYY (L, 0–2)	1.1
1960 World Series	Game 6	October 12	Whitey Ford‡, NYY (W, 7–4)	**9**	Bob Friend, PIT (L, 0–2)	4
1960 World Series	Game 7	October 13	Bob Turley, NYY	1	Vern Law, PIT	5
1961 World Series	Game 1	October 4	Jim O'Toole, CIN (L, 0–1)	7	Whitey Ford‡, NYY (W, 8–4)	**9**
1961 World Series	Game 2	October 5	Joey Jay, CIN (W, 1–0)	**9**	Ralph Terry, NYY (L, 0–2)	7
1961 World Series	Game 3	October 7	Bill Stafford, NYY	6.2	Bob Purkey, CIN (L, 0–1)	**9**
1961 World Series	Game 4	October 8	Whitey Ford‡, NYY (W, 9–4)	5	Jim O'Toole, CIN (L, 0–2)	5
1961 World Series	Game 5	October 9	Ralph Terry, NYY	2.1	Joey Jay, CIN (L, 1–1)	0.2
1962 World Series	Game 1	October 4	Whitey Ford‡, NYY (W, 10–4)	**9**	Billy O'Dell, SF (L, 0–1)	7.1
1962 World Series	Game 2	October 5	Ralph Terry, NYY (L, 0–3)	7	Jack Sanford, SF (W, 1–0)	**9**
1962 World Series	Game 3	October 7	Billy Pierce, SF (L, 0–1)	6	Bill Stafford, NYY (W, 1–0)	**9**
1962 World Series	Game 4	October 8	Juan Marichal‡, SF	4	Whitey Ford‡, NYY	6
1962 World Series	Game 5	October 10	Jack Sanford, SF (L, 1–1)	7.1	Ralph Terry, NYY (W, 1–3)	**9**
1962 World Series	Game 6	October 15	Whitey Ford‡, NYY (L, 10–5)	4.2	Billy Pierce, SF (W, 1–1)	**9**
1962 World Series	Game 7	October 16	Ralph Terry, NYY (W, 2–3)	**9**	Jack Sanford, SF (L, 1–2)	7
1963 World Series	Game 1	October 2	Sandy Koufax‡, LAD (W, 1–1)	**9**	Whitey Ford‡, NYY (L, 10–6)	5
1963 World Series	Game 2	October 3	Johnny Podres, LAD (W, 4–1)	8.1	Al Downing, NYY (L, 0–1)	5
1963 World Series	Game 3	October 5	Don Drysdale‡, LAD (W, 2–0)	**9**	Jim Bouton, NYY (L, 0–1)	7
1963 World Series	Game 4	October 6	Whitey Ford‡, NYY (L, 10–7)	7	Sandy Koufax‡, LAD (W, 2–1)	**9**
1964 World Series	Game 1	October 7	Whitey Ford‡, NYY (L, 10–8)	5.1	Ray Sadecki, STL (W, 1–0)	6
1964 World Series	Game 2	October 8	Mel Stottlemyre, NYY (W, 1–0)	**9**	Bob Gibson‡, STL (L, 0–1)	8
1964 World Series	Game 3	October 10	Curt Simmons, STL	8	Jim Bouton, NYY (W, 1–1)	**9**
1964 World Series	Game 4	October 11	Al Downing, NYY (L, 0–2)	6	Ray Sadecki, STL	0.1
1964 World Series	Game 5	October 12	Bob Gibson‡, STL (W, 1–1)	**10**	Mel Stottlemyre, NYY	7
1964 World Series	Game 6	October 14	Jim Bouton, NYY (W, 2–1)	8.1	Curt Simmons, STL (L, 0–1)	6.1
1964 World Series	Game 7	October 15	Mel Stottlemyre, NYY (L, 1–1)	4	Bob Gibson‡, STL (W, 2–1)	**9**
1965 World Series	Game 1	October 6	Don Drysdale‡, LAD (L, 2–1)	2.2	Mudcat Grant, MIN (W, 1–0)	**9**
1965 World Series	Game 2	October 7	Sandy Koufax‡, LAD (L, 2–2)	6	Jim Kaat, MIN (W, 1–0)	**9**
1965 World Series	Game 3	October 7	Camilo Pascual, MIN (L, 0–1)	5	Claude Osteen, LAD (W, 1–0)	**9**
1965 World Series	Game 4	October 10	Mudcat Grant, MIN (L, 1–1)	5	Don Drysdale‡, LAD (W, 3–1)	**9**
1965 World Series	Game 5	October 11	Jim Kaat, MIN (L, 1–1)	2.1	Sandy Koufax‡, LAD (W, 3–2)	**9**
1965 World Series	Game 6	October 13	Claude Osteen, LAD (L, 1–1)	5	Mudcat Grant, MIN (W, 2–1)	**9**
1965 World Series	Game 7	October 14	Sandy Koufax‡, LAD (W, 4–2)	**9**	Jim Kaat, MIN (L, 1–2)	3
1966 World Series	Game 1	October 5	Dave McNally, BAL	2.1	Don Drysdale‡, LAD (L, 3–2)	2
1966 World Series	Game 2	October 6	Jim Palmer‡, BAL (W, 1–0)	**9**	Sandy Koufax‡, LAD (L, 4–3)	6
1966 World Series	Game 3	October 8	Claude Osteen, LAD (L, 1–2)	7	Wally Bunker, BAL (W, 1–0)	**9**
1966 World Series	Game 4	October 9	Don Drysdale‡, LAD (L, 3–3)	8	Dave McNally, BAL (W, 1–0)	**9**
1967 World Series	Game 1	October 4	Bob Gibson‡, STL (W, 3–1)	**9**	José Santiago, BOS (L, 0–1)	7
1967 World Series	Game 2	October 5	Dick Hughes, STL (L, 1–0)	5.1	Jim Lonborg, BOS (W, 1–0)	**9**
1967 World Series	Game 3	October 7	Gary Bell, BOS (L, 0–1)	2	Nelson Briles, STL (W, 1–0)	**9**
1967 World Series	Game 4	October 8	José Santiago, BOS (L, 0–2)	0.2	Bob Gibson‡, STL (W, 4–1)	**9**
1967 World Series	Game 5	October 9	Jim Lonborg, BOS (W, 2–0)	**9**	Steve Carlton‡, STL (L, 0–1)	6
1967 World Series	Game 6	October 11	Dick Hughes, STL	3.2	Gary Waslewski, BOS	5.1
1967 World Series	Game 7	October 12	Bob Gibson‡, STL (W, 5–1)	**9**	Jim Lonborg, BOS	6
1968 World Series	Game 1	October 2	Denny McLain, DET (L, 0–1)	5	Bob Gibson‡, STL (W, 6–1)	**9**
1968 World Series	Game 2	October 3	Mickey Lolich, DET (W, 1–0)	**9**	Nelson Briles, STL (L, 1–1)	5
1968 World Series	Game 3	October 5	Ray Washburn, STL (W, 1–0)	5.1	Earl Wilson, DET (L, 0–1)	4.1
1968 World Series	Game 4	October 6	Bob Gibson‡, STL (W, 7–1)	**9**	Denny McLain, DET (L, 0–2)	2.2
1968 World Series	Game 5	October 7	Nelson Briles, STL	6.1	Mickey Lolich, DET (W, 2–0)	**9**
1968 World Series	Game 6	October 9	Denny McLain, DET (W, 1–2)	**9**	Ray Washburn, STL (L, 1–1)	2
1968 World Series	Game 7	October 10	Mickey Lolich, DET (W, 3–0)	**9**	Bob Gibson‡, STL (L, 7–2)	**9**
1969 World Series	Game 1	October 11	Tom Seaver‡, NYM (L, 0–1)	5	Mike Cuellar, BAL (W, 1–0)	**9**
1969 World Series	Game 2	October 12	Jerry Koosman, NYM (W, 1–0)	8.2	Dave McNally, BAL (L, 1–1)	**9**
1969 World Series	Game 3	October 14	Jim Palmer‡, BAL (L, 1–1)	6	Gary Gentry, NYM (W, 1–0)	6.2
1969 World Series	Game 4	October 15	Mike Cuellar, BAL	7	Tom Seaver‡, NYM (W, 1–1)	**10**
1969 World Series	Game 5	October 16	Dave McNally, BAL	7	Jerry Koosman, NYM (W, 2–0)	**9**

=== 1970s ===
World Series	Game	Game date	Visiting starting pitcher	IP	Home starting pitcher	IP
1970 World Series	Game 1	October 10	Jim Palmer‡, BAL (W, 2–1)	8.2	Gary Nolan, CIN (L, 0–1)	6.2
1970 World Series	Game 2	October 11	Mike Cuellar, BAL	2.1	Jim McGlothlin, CIN	4.1
1970 World Series	Game 3	October 13	Tony Cloninger, CIN (L, 0–1)	5.1	Dave McNally, BAL (W, 2–1)	**9**
1970 World Series	Game 4	October 14	Gary Nolan, CIN	2.2	Jim Palmer‡, BAL	7
1970 World Series	Game 5	October 15	Jim Merritt, CIN (L, 0–1)	1.2	Mike Cuellar, BAL (W, 2–0)	**9**
1971 World Series	Game 1	October 9	Dock Ellis, PIT (L, 0–1)	2.1	Dave McNally, BAL (W, 3–1)	**9**
1971 World Series	Game 2	October 11	Bob Johnson, PIT (L, 0–1)	3.1	Jim Palmer‡, BAL (W, 3–1)	8
1971 World Series	Game 3	October 12	Mike Cuellar, BAL (L, 2–1)	6	Steve Blass, PIT (W, 1–0)	**9**
1971 World Series	Game 4	October 13	Pat Dobson, BAL	5.1	Luke Walker, PIT	0.2
1971 World Series	Game 5	October 14	Dave McNally, BAL (L, 3–2)	4	Nelson Briles, PIT (W, 2–1)	**9**
1971 World Series	Game 6	October 16	Bob Moose, PIT	5	Jim Palmer‡, BAL	9
1971 World Series	Game 7	October 17	Steve Blass, PIT (W, 2–0)	**9**	Mike Cuellar, BAL (L, 2–2)	8
1972 World Series	Game 1	October 14	Ken Holtzman, OAK (W, 1–0)	5	Gary Nolan, CIN (L, 0–2)	6
1972 World Series	Game 2	October 15	Catfish Hunter‡, OAK (W, 1–0)	8.2	Ross Grimsley, CIN (L, 0–1)	5
1972 World Series	Game 3	October 18	Jack Billingham, CIN (W, 1–0)	8	Blue Moon Odom, OAK (L, 0–1)	7
1972 World Series	Game 4	October 19	Don Gullett, CIN	7	Ken Holtzman, OAK	7.2
1972 World Series	Game 5	October 20	Jim McGlothlin, CIN	3	Catfish Hunter‡, OAK	4.2
1972 World Series	Game 6	October 21	Vida Blue, OAK (L, 0–1)	5.2	Gary Nolan, CIN	4.2
1972 World Series	Game 7	October 22	Blue Moon Odom, OAK	4.1	Jack Billingham, CIN	5
1973 World Series	Game 1	October 13	Jon Matlack, NYM (L, 0–1)	6	Ken Holtzman, OAK (W, 2–0)	5
1973 World Series	Game 2	October 14	Jerry Koosman, NYM	2.1	Vida Blue, OAK	5.1
1973 World Series	Game 3	October 16	Catfish Hunter‡, OAK	6	Tom Seaver‡, NYM	8
1973 World Series	Game 4	October 17	Ken Holtzman, OAK (L, 2–1)	0.1	Jon Matlack, NYM (W, 1–1)	8
1973 World Series	Game 5	October 18	Vida Blue, OAK (L, 0–2)	5.2	Jerry Koosman, NYM (W, 3–0)	6.1
1973 World Series	Game 6	October 20	Tom Seaver‡, NYM (L, 1–2)	7	Catfish Hunter‡, OAK (W, 2–0)	7.1
1973 World Series	Game 7	October 21	Jon Matlack, NYM (L, 1–2)	2.2	Ken Holtzman, OAK (W, 3–1)	5.1
1974 World Series	Game 1	October 12	Ken Holtzman, OAK	4.1	Andy Messersmith, LAD (L, 0–1)	8
1974 World Series	Game 2	October 14	Vida Blue, OAK (L, 0–3)	7	Don Sutton‡, LAD (W, 1–0)	8
1974 World Series	Game 3	October 15	Al Downing, LAD (L, 0–3)	3.2	Catfish Hunter‡, OAK (W, 3–0)	7.1
1974 World Series	Game 4	October 16	Andy Messersmith, LAD (L, 0–2)	6	Ken Holtzman, OAK (W, 3–1)	7.2
1974 World Series	Game 5	October 17	Don Sutton‡, LAD	5	Vida Blue, OAK	6.2
1975 World Series	Game 1	October 11	Don Gullett, CIN (L, 0–1)	6	Luis Tiant, BOS (W, 1–0)	**9**
1975 World Series	Game 2	October 12	Jack Billingham, CIN	5.2	Bill Lee, BOS	8
1975 World Series	Game 3	October 14	Rick Wise, BOS	4.1	Gary Nolan, CIN	4
1975 World Series	Game 4	October 15	Luis Tiant, BOS (W, 2–0)	**9**	Fred Norman, CIN (L, 0–1)	3.1
1975 World Series	Game 5	October 16	Reggie Cleveland, BOS (L, 0–1)	5	Don Gullett, CIN (W, 1–1)	8.2
1975 World Series	Game 6	October 21	Gary Nolan, CIN	2	Luis Tiant, BOS	7
1975 World Series	Game 7	October 22	Don Gullett, CIN	4	Bill Lee, BOS	6.1
1976 World Series	Game 1	October 16	Doyle Alexander, NYY (L, 0–1)	6	Don Gullett, CIN (W, 2–1)	7.1
1976 World Series	Game 2	October 17	Catfish Hunter‡, NYY (L, 3–1)	**8.2**	Fred Norman, CIN	6.1
1976 World Series	Game 3	October 19	Pat Zachry, CIN (W, 1–0)	6.2	Dock Ellis, NYY (L, 0–2)	3.1
1976 World Series	Game 4	October 21	Gary Nolan, CIN (W, 1–2)	6.2	Ed Figueroa, NYY (L, 0–1)	8
1977 World Series	Game 1	October 11	Don Sutton‡, LAD	7	Don Gullett, NYY	8.1
1977 World Series	Game 2	October 12	Burt Hooton, LAD (W, 1–0)	**9**	Catfish Hunter‡, NYY (L, 3–2)	2.1
1977 World Series	Game 3	October 14	Mike Torrez, NYY (W, 1–0)	**9**	Tommy John, LAD (L, 0–1)	6
1977 World Series	Game 4	October 15	Ron Guidry, NYY (W, 1–0)	**9**	Doug Rau, LAD (L, 0–1)	1
1977 World Series	Game 5	October 16	Don Gullett, NYY (L, 2–2)	4.1	Don Sutton‡, LAD (W, 2–0)	**9**
1977 World Series	Game 6	October 18	Burt Hooton, LAD (L, 1–1)	3	Mike Torrez, NYY (W, 2–0)	**9**
1978 World Series	Game 1	October 10	Ed Figueroa, NYY (L, 0–2)	1.2	Tommy John, LAD (W, 1–1)	7.2
1978 World Series	Game 2	October 11	Catfish Hunter‡, NYY (L, 3–3)	6	Burt Hooton, LAD (W, 2–1)	6
1978 World Series	Game 3	October 13	Don Sutton‡, LAD (L, 2–1)	6.1	Ron Guidry, NYY (W, 2–0)	**9**
1978 World Series	Game 4	October 14	Tommy John, LAD	7	Ed Figueroa, NYY	5
1978 World Series	Game 5	October 15	Burt Hooton, LAD (L, 2–2)	2.1	Jim Beattie, NYY	**9**
1978 World Series	Game 6	October 17	Catfish Hunter‡, NYY (W, 4–3)	7	Don Sutton‡, LAD (L, 2–2)	5.2
1979 World Series	Game 1	October 10	Bruce Kison, PIT (L, 0–1)	0.1	Mike Flanagan, BAL (W, 1–0)	**9**
1979 World Series	Game 2	October 11	Bert Blyleven, PIT	6	Jim Palmer‡, BAL	7
1979 World Series	Game 3	October 12	Scott McGregor, BAL (W, 1–0)	**9**	John Candelaria, PIT (L, 0–1)	3
1979 World Series	Game 4	October 13	Dennis Martínez, BAL	1.1	Jim Bibby, PIT	6.1
1979 World Series	Game 5	October 14	Mike Flanagan, BAL (L, 1–1)	6	Jim Rooker, PIT	5
1979 World Series	Game 6	October 16	John Candelaria, PIT (W, 1–1)	6	Jim Palmer‡, BAL (L, 3–2)	8
1979 World Series	Game 7	October 17	Jim Bibby, PIT	4	Scott McGregor, BAL (L, 1–1)	8

=== 1980s ===
World Series	Game	Game date	Visiting starting pitcher	IP	Home starting pitcher	IP
1980 World Series	Game 1	October 14	Dennis Leonard, KC (L, 0–1)	3.2	Bob Walk, PHI (W, 1–0)	7
1980 World Series	Game 2	October 15	Larry Gura, KC	6	Steve Carlton‡, PHI (W, 1–1)	8
1980 World Series	Game 3	October 17	Dick Ruthven, PHI	9	Rich Gale, KC	4.1
1980 World Series	Game 4	October 18	Larry Christenson, PHI	0.1	Dennis Leonard, KC (W, 1–1)	7
1980 World Series	Game 5	October 19	Marty Bystrom, PHI	5	Larry Gura, KC	6.1
1980 World Series	Game 6	October 21	Rich Gale, KC (L, 0–1)	2	Steve Carlton‡, PHI (W, 3–1)	7
1981 World Series	Game 1	October 20	Jerry Reuss, LAD (L, 0–1)	2.2	Ron Guidry, NYY (W, 3–0)	7
1981 World Series	Game 2	October 21	Burt Hooton, LAD (L, 2–3)	7	Tommy John, NYY (W, 2–2)	7
1981 World Series	Game 3	October 23	Dave Righetti, NYY	2	Fernando Valenzuela, LAD (W, 1–0)	**9**
1981 World Series	Game 4	October 24	Rick Reuschel, NYY	3	Bob Welch, LAD	0
1981 World Series	Game 5	October 25	Ron Guidry, NYY (L, 3–1)	7	Jerry Reuss, LAD (W, 1–1)	**9**
1981 World Series	Game 6	October 28	Burt Hooton, LAD (W, 3–3)	5.1	Tommy John, NYY	4
1982 World Series	Game 1	October 12	Mike Caldwell, MIL (W, 1–0)	**9**	Bob Forsch, STL (L, 0–1)	5.2
1982 World Series	Game 2	October 13	Don Sutton‡, MIL	6	John Stuper, STL	4
1982 World Series	Game 3	October 15	Joaquín Andújar, STL (W, 1–0)	6.1	Pete Vuckovich, MIL (L, 0–1)	8.2
1982 World Series	Game 4	October 16	Dave LaPoint, STL	6.2	Moose Haas, MIL	5.1
1982 World Series	Game 5	October 17	Bob Forsch, STL (L, 0–2)	7	Mike Caldwell, MIL (W, 2–0)	8.1
1982 World Series	Game 6	October 19	Don Sutton‡, MIL (L, 2–3)	4.1	John Stuper, STL (W, 1–0)	**9**
1982 World Series	Game 7	October 20	Pete Vuckovich, MIL	5.1	Joaquin Andujar, STL (W, 3–0)	7
1983 World Series	Game 1	October 11	John Denny, PHI (W, 1–0)	7.2	Scott McGregor, BAL (L, 0–1)	8
1983 World Series	Game 2	October 12	Charles Hudson, PHI (L, 0–1)	4.1	Mike Boddicker, BAL (W, 1–0)	**9**
1983 World Series	Game 3	October 14	Mike Flanagan, BAL	4	Steve Carlton‡, PHI (L, 2–2)	6.2
1983 World Series	Game 4	October 15	Storm Davis, BAL (W, 1–0)	5	John Denny, PHI (L, 1–1)	5.1
1983 World Series	Game 5	October 16	Scott McGregor, BAL (W, 1–1)	**9**	Charles Hudson, PHI (L, 0–2)	4
1984 World Series	Game 1	October 9	Jack Morris‡, DET (W, 1–0)	**9**	Mark Thurmond, SD (L, 0–1)	5
1984 World Series	Game 2	October 10	Dan Petry, DET (L, 0–1)	4.1	Ed Whitson, SD	0.2
1984 World Series	Game 3	October 12	Tim Lollar, SD (L, 0–1)	1.2	Milt Wilcox, DET (W, 1–0)	6
1984 World Series	Game 4	October 13	Eric Show, SD (L, 0–1)	2.2	Jack Morris‡, DET (W, 2–0)	**9**
1984 World Series	Game 5	October 14	Mark Thurmond, SD	0.1	Dan Petry, DET	3.2
1985 World Series	Game 1	October 19	John Tudor, STL (W, 1–0)	6.2	Danny Jackson, KC (L, 0–1)	7
1985 World Series	Game 2	October 20	Danny Cox, STL	7	Charlie Leibrandt, KC (L, 0–1)	8.2
1985 World Series	Game 3	October 22	Bret Saberhagen, KC (W, 1–0)	**9**	Joaquín Andújar, STL (L, 1–1)	4
1985 World Series	Game 4	October 23	Bud Black, KC (L, 0–1)	5	John Tudor, STL (W, 2–0)	**9**
1985 World Series	Game 5	October 24	Danny Jackson, KC (W, 1–1)	**9**	Bob Forsch, STL (L, 0–3)	1.2
1985 World Series	Game 6	October 26	Danny Cox, STL	7	Charlie Leibrandt, KC	7.2
1985 World Series	Game 7	October 27	John Tudor, STL (L, 2–1)	2.1	Bret Saberhagen, KC (W, 2–0)	**9**
1986 World Series	Game 1	October 18	Bruce Hurst, BOS (W, 1–0)	8	Ron Darling, NYM (L, 0–1)	7
1986 World Series	Game 2	October 19	Roger Clemens, BOS	4.1	Dwight Gooden, NYM (L, 0–1)	5
1986 World Series	Game 3	October 21	Bob Ojeda, NYM (W, 1–0)	7	Oil Can Boyd, BOS (L, 0–1)	7
1986 World Series	Game 4	October 22	Ron Darling, NYM (W, 1–1)	7	Al Nipper, BOS (L, 0–1)	6
1986 World Series	Game 5	October 23	Dwight Gooden, NYM (L, 0–2)	4	Bruce Hurst, BOS (W, 2–0)	**9**
1986 World Series	Game 6	October 25	Roger Clemens, BOS	7	Bob Ojeda, NYM	6
1986 World Series	Game 7	October 27	Bruce Hurst, BOS	6	Ron Darling, NYM	3.2
1987 World Series	Game 1	October 17	Joe Magrane, STL (L, 0–1)	3	Frank Viola, MIN (W, 1–0)	8
1987 World Series	Game 2	October 18	Danny Cox, STL (L, 0–1)	3.2	Bert Blyleven‡, MIN (W, 1–0)	7
1987 World Series	Game 3	October 20	Les Straker, MIN	6	John Tudor, STL (W, 3–1)	7
1987 World Series	Game 4	October 21	Frank Viola, MIN (L, 1–1)	3.1	Greg Mathews, STL	3.2
1987 World Series	Game 5	October 22	Bert Blyleven‡, MIN (L, 1–1)	6	Danny Cox, STL (W, 1–1)	7.1
1987 World Series	Game 6	October 24	John Tudor, STL (L, 3–2)	4	Les Straker, MIN	3
1987 World Series	Game 7	October 25	Joe Magrane, STL	4.1	Frank Viola, MIN (W, 2–1)	8
1988 World Series	Game 1	October 15	Dave Stewart, OAK	8	Tim Belcher, LAD	2
1988 World Series	Game 2	October 16	Storm Davis, OAK (L, 1–1)	3.1	Orel Hershiser, LAD (W, 1–0)	**9**
1988 World Series	Game 3	October 18	John Tudor, LAD	1.1	Bob Welch, OAK	5
1988 World Series	Game 4	October 19	Tim Belcher, LAD (W, 1–0)	6.2	Dave Stewart, OAK (L, 0–1)	6.1
1988 World Series	Game 5	October 20	Orel Hershiser, LAD (W, 2–0)	**9**	Storm Davis, OAK (L, 1–2)	4.2
1989 World Series	Game 1	October 14	Scott Garrelts, SF (L, 0–1)	4	Dave Stewart, OAK (W, 1–1)	**9**
1989 World Series	Game 2	October 15	Rick Reuschel, SF (L, 0–1)	4	Mike Moore, OAK (W, 1–0)	7
1989 World Series	Game 3	October 27	Dave Stewart, OAK (W, 2–1)	7	Scott Garrelts, SF (L, 0–2)	3.1
1989 World Series	Game 4	October 28	Mike Moore, OAK (W, 2–0)	6	Don Robinson, SF (L, 0–1)	1.2

=== 1990s ===
World Series	Game	Game date	Visiting starting pitcher	IP	Home starting pitcher	IP
1990 World Series	Game 1	October 16	Dave Stewart, OAK (L, 2–2)	4	José Rijo, CIN (W, 1–0)	7
1990 World Series	Game 2	October 17	Bob Welch, OAK	7.1	Danny Jackson, CIN	2.2
1990 World Series	Game 3	October 19	Tom Browning, CIN (W, 1–0)	6	Mike Moore, OAK (L, 2–1)	2.2
1990 World Series	Game 4	October 20	José Rijo, CIN (W, 2–0)	8.1	Dave Stewart, OAK (L, 2–3)	**9**
1991 World Series	Game 1	October 19	Charlie Leibrandt, ATL (L, 0–2)	4	Jack Morris‡, MIN (W, 3–0)	7
1991 World Series	Game 2	October 20	Tom Glavine‡, ATL (L, 0–1)	**8**	Kevin Tapani, MIN (W, 1–0)	8
1991 World Series	Game 3	October 22	Scott Erickson, MIN	4.2	Steve Avery, ATL	7
1991 World Series	Game 4	October 23	Jack Morris‡, MIN	6	John Smoltz‡, ATL	7
1991 World Series	Game 5	October 24	Kevin Tapani, MIN (L, 1–1)	4	Tom Glavine‡, ATL (W, 1–1)	5.1
1991 World Series	Game 6	October 26	Steve Avery, ATL	6	Scott Erickson, MIN	6
1991 World Series	Game 7	October 27	John Smoltz‡, ATL	7.1	Jack Morris‡, MIN (W, 4–0)	**10**
1992 World Series	Game 1	October 17	Jack Morris‡, TOR (L, 4–1)	6	Tom Glavine‡, ATL (W, 2–1)	**9**
1992 World Series	Game 2	October 18	David Cone, TOR	4.1	John Smoltz‡, ATL	7.1
1992 World Series	Game 3	October 20	Steve Avery, ATL (L, 0–1)	8	Juan Guzmán, TOR	8
1992 World Series	Game 4	October 21	Tom Glavine‡, ATL (L, 2–2)	**8**	Jimmy Key, TOR (W, 1–0)	7.2
1992 World Series	Game 5	October 22	John Smoltz‡, ATL (W, 1–0)	6	Jack Morris‡, TOR (L, 4–2)	4.2
1992 World Series	Game 6	October 24	David Cone, TOR	6	Steve Avery, ATL	4
1993 World Series	Game 1	October 16	Curt Schilling, PHI (L, 0–1)	6.1	Juan Guzmán, TOR	5
1993 World Series	Game 2	October 17	Terry Mulholland, PHI (W, 1–0)	5.2	Dave Stewart, TOR (L, 2–4)	6
1993 World Series	Game 3	October 19	Pat Hentgen, TOR (W, 1–0)	6	Danny Jackson, PHI (L, 1–2)	5
1993 World Series	Game 4	October 20	Todd Stottlemyre, TOR	2	Tommy Greene, PHI	2.1
1993 World Series	Game 5	October 21	Juan Guzmán, TOR (L, 0–1)	7	Curt Schilling, PHI (W, 1–1)	**9**
1993 World Series	Game 6	October 23	Terry Mulholland, PHI	5	Dave Stewart, TOR	6
1994 World Series			not played			
1995 World Series	Game 1	October 21	Orel Hershiser, CLE (L, 2–1)	6	Greg Maddux‡, ATL (W, 1–0)	**9**
1995 World Series	Game 2	October 22	Dennis Martínez, CLE (L, 0–1)	5.2	Tom Glavine‡, ATL (W, 3–2)	6
1995 World Series	Game 3	October 24	John Smoltz‡, ATL	2.1	Charles Nagy, CLE	7
1995 World Series	Game 4	October 25	Steve Avery, ATL (W, 1–1)	6	Ken Hill, CLE (L, 0–1)	6.1
1995 World Series	Game 5	October 26	Greg Maddux‡, ATL (L, 1–1)	7	Orel Hershiser, CLE (W, 2–2)	8
1995 World Series	Game 6	October 28	Dennis Martínez, CLE	4.2	Tom Glavine‡, ATL (W, 4–2)	8
1996 World Series	Game 1	October 20	John Smoltz‡, ATL (W, 2–0)	6	Andy Pettitte, NYY (L, 0–1)	2.1
1996 World Series	Game 2	October 21	Greg Maddux‡, ATL (W, 2–1)	8	Jimmy Key, NYY (L, 1–1)	6
1996 World Series	Game 3	October 22	David Cone, NYY (W, 1–0)	6	Tom Glavine‡, ATL (L, 4–3)	7
1996 World Series	Game 4	October 23	Kenny Rogers, NYY	2	Denny Neagle, ATL	5
1996 World Series	Game 5	October 24	Andy Pettitte, NYY (W, 1–1)	8.1	John Smoltz‡, ATL (L, 2–1)	8
1996 World Series	Game 6	October 26	Greg Maddux‡, ATL (L, 2–2)	7.2	Jimmy Key, NYY (W, 2–1)	5.1
1997 World Series	Game 1	October 18	Orel Hershiser, CLE (L, 2–3)	4.1	Liván Hernández, FLA (W, 1–0)	5.2
1997 World Series	Game 2	October 19	Chad Ogea, CLE (W, 1–0)	6.2	Kevin Brown, FLA (L, 0–1)	6
1997 World Series	Game 3	October 21	Al Leiter, FLA	4.2	Charles Nagy, CLE	6
1997 World Series	Game 4	October 22	Tony Saunders, FLA (L, 0–1)	2	Jaret Wright, CLE (W, 1–0)	6
1997 World Series	Game 5	October 23	Liván Hernández, FLA (W, 2–0)	8	Orel Hershiser, CLE (L, 2–4)	5.2
1997 World Series	Game 6	October 25	Chad Ogea, CLE (W, 2–0)	5	Kevin Brown, FLA (L, 0–2)	5
1997 World Series	Game 7	October 26	Jaret Wright, CLE	6.1	Al Leiter, FLA	6
1998 World Series	Game 1	October 17	Kevin Brown, SD	6.1	David Wells, NYY (W, 1–0)	7
1998 World Series	Game 2	October 18	Andy Ashby, SD (L, 0–1)	2.2	Orlando Hernández, NYY (W, 1–0)	7
1998 World Series	Game 3	October 20	David Cone, NYY	6	Sterling Hitchcock, SD	6
1998 World Series	Game 4	October 21	Andy Pettitte, NYY (W, 2–1)	7.1	Kevin Brown, SD (L, 0–3)	8
1999 World Series	Game 1	October 23	Orlando Hernández, NYY (W, 2–0)	7	Greg Maddux‡, ATL (L, 2–3)	7
1999 World Series	Game 2	October 24	David Cone, NYY (W, 2–0)	7	Kevin Millwood, ATL (L, 0–1)	2
1999 World Series	Game 3	October 26	Tom Glavine‡, ATL	7	Andy Pettitte, NYY	3.2
1999 World Series	Game 4	October 27	John Smoltz‡, ATL (L, 2–2)	7	Roger Clemens, NYY (W, 1–0)	7.2

=== 2000s ===
World Series	Game	Game date	Visiting starting pitcher	IP	Home starting pitcher	IP
2000 World Series	Game 1	October 21	Al Leiter, NYM	7	Andy Pettitte, NYY	6.2
2000 World Series	Game 2	October 22	Mike Hampton, NYM (L, 0–1)	6	Roger Clemens, NYY (W, 2–0)	8
2000 World Series	Game 3	October 24	Orlando Hernández, NYY (L, 2–1)	7.1	Rick Reed, NYM	6
2000 World Series	Game 4	October 25	Denny Neagle, NYY	4.2	Bobby J. Jones, NYM (L, 0–1)	5
2000 World Series	Game 5	October 26	Andy Pettitte, NYY	7	Al Leiter, NYM (L, 0–1)	8.2
2001 World Series	Game 1	October 27	Mike Mussina, NYY (L, 0–1)	3	Curt Schilling, AZ (W, 2–1)	7
2001 World Series	Game 2	October 28	Andy Pettitte, NYY (L, 2–2)	7	Randy Johnson‡, AZ (W, 1–0)	**9**
2001 World Series	Game 3	October 30	Brian Anderson, AZ (L, 0–1)	5.1	Roger Clemens, NYY (W, 3–0)	7
2001 World Series	Game 4	October 31	Curt Schilling, AZ	7	Orlando Hernández, NYY	6.1
2001 World Series	Game 5	November 1	Miguel Batista, AZ	7.2	Mike Mussina, NYY	8
2001 World Series	Game 6	November 3	Andy Pettitte, NYY (L, 2–3)	2	Randy Johnson‡, AZ (W, 2–0)	7
2001 World Series	Game 7	November 4	Roger Clemens, NYY	6.1	Curt Schilling, AZ	7.1
2002 World Series	Game 1	October 19	Jason Schmidt, SF (W, 1–0)	5.2	Jarrod Washburn, ANA (L, 0–1)	5.2
2002 World Series	Game 2	October 20	Russ Ortiz, SF	1.2	Kevin Appier, ANA	2
2002 World Series	Game 3	October 22	Ramón Ortiz, ANA (W, 1–0)	5	Liván Hernández, SF (L, 2–1)	3.2
2002 World Series	Game 4	October 23	John Lackey, ANA	5	Kirk Rueter, SF	6
2002 World Series	Game 5	October 24	Jarrod Washburn, ANA (L, 0–2)	4	Jason Schmidt, SF	4.2
2002 World Series	Game 6	October 26	Russ Ortiz, SF	6.1	Kevin Appier, ANA	4.1
2002 World Series	Game 7	October 27	Liván Hernández, SF (L, 2–2)	2	John Lackey, ANA (W, 1–0)	5
2003 World Series	Game 1	October 18	Brad Penny, FLA (W, 1–0)	5.1	David Wells, NYY (L, 1–1)	7
2003 World Series	Game 2	October 19	Mark Redman, FLA (L, 0–1)	2.1	Andy Pettitte, NYY (W, 3–3)	8.2
2003 World Series	Game 3	October 21	Mike Mussina, NYY (W, 1–1)	7	Josh Beckett, FLA (L, 0–1)	7.1
2003 World Series	Game 4	October 22	Roger Clemens, NYY	7	Carl Pavano, FLA	8
2003 World Series	Game 5	October 23	David Wells, NYY	1	Brad Penny, FLA (W, 2–0)	7
2003 World Series	Game 6	October 25	Josh Beckett, FLA (W, 1–1)	**9**	Andy Pettitte, NYY (L, 3–4)	7
2004 World Series	Game 1	October 23	Woody Williams, STL	2.1	Tim Wakefield, BOS	3.2
2004 World Series	Game 2	October 24	Matt Morris, STL (L, 0–1)	4.1	Curt Schilling, BOS (W, 3–1)	6
2004 World Series	Game 3	October 26	Pedro Martínez‡, BOS (W, 1–0)	7	Jeff Suppan, STL (L, 0–1)	4.2
2004 World Series	Game 4	October 27	Derek Lowe, BOS (W, 1–0)	7	Jason Marquis, STL (L, 0–1)	6
2005 World Series	Game 1	October 22	Roger Clemens, HOU	2	José Contreras, CWS (W, 1–0)	7
2005 World Series	Game 2	October 23	Andy Pettitte, HOU	6	Mark Buehrle, CWS	7
2005 World Series	Game 3	October 25	Jon Garland, CWS	7	Roy Oswalt, HOU	6
2005 World Series	Game 4	October 26	Freddy García, CWS (W, 1–0)	7	Brandon Backe, HOU	7
2006 World Series	Game 1	October 21	Anthony Reyes, STL (W, 1–0)	8	Justin Verlander, DET (L, 0–1)	5
2006 World Series	Game 2	October 22	Jeff Weaver, STL (L, 0–1)	5	Kenny Rogers, DET (W, 1–0)	6
2006 World Series	Game 3	October 24	Nate Robertson, DET (L, 0–1)	5	Chris Carpenter, STL (W, 1–0)	8
2006 World Series	Game 4	October 26	Jeremy Bonderman, DET	5.1	Jeff Suppan, STL	6
2006 World Series	Game 5	October 27	Justin Verlander, DET (L, 0–2)	6	Jeff Weaver, STL (W, 1–1)	8
2007 World Series	Game 1	October 24	Jeff Francis, COL (L, 0–1)	4	Josh Beckett, BOS (W, 2–1)	7
2007 World Series	Game 2	October 25	Ubaldo Jiménez, COL (L, 0–1)	4.2	Curt Schilling, BOS (W, 4–1)	5.1
2007 World Series	Game 3	October 27	Daisuke Matsuzaka, BOS (W, 1–0)	5.1	Josh Fogg, COL (L, 0–1)	2.2
2007 World Series	Game 4	October 28	Jon Lester, BOS (W, 1–0)	5.2	Aaron Cook, COL (L, 0–1)	6
2008 World Series	Game 1	October 22	Cole Hamels, PHI (W, 1–0)	7	Scott Kazmir, TB (L, 0–1)	6
2008 World Series	Game 2	October 23	Brett Myers, PHI (L, 0–1)	7	James Shields, TB (W, 1–0)	5.2
2008 World Series	Game 3	October 25	Matt Garza, TB	6	Jamie Moyer, PHI	6.1
2008 World Series	Game 4	October 26	Andy Sonnanstine, TB (L, 0–1)	4	Joe Blanton, PHI (W, 1–0)	6
2008 World Series	Game 5	October 27/29	Scott Kazmir, TB	4	Cole Hamels, PHI	6
2009 World Series	Game 1	October 28	Cliff Lee, PHI (W, 1–0)	**9**	CC Sabathia‡, NYY (L, 0–1)	7
2009 World Series	Game 2	October 29	Pedro Martínez‡, PHI (L, 1–1)	6	A. J. Burnett, NYY (W, 1–0)	7
2009 World Series	Game 3	October 31	Andy Pettitte, NYY (W, 4–4)	6	Cole Hamels, PHI (L, 1–1)	4.1
2009 World Series	Game 4	November 1	CC Sabathia‡, NYY	6.2	Joe Blanton, PHI	6
2009 World Series	Game 5	November 2	A. J. Burnett, NYY (L, 1–1)	2	Cliff Lee, PHI (W, 2–0)	7
2009 World Series	Game 6	November 4	Pedro Martínez‡, PHI (L, 1–2)	4	Andy Pettitte, NYY (W, 5–4)	5.2

=== 2010s ===
World Series	Game	Game date	Visiting starting pitcher	IP	Home starting pitcher	IP
2010 World Series	Game 1	October 27	Cliff Lee, TEX (L, 2–1)	4.2	Tim Lincecum, SF (W, 1–0)	5.2
2010 World Series	Game 2	October 28	C. J. Wilson, TEX (L, 0–1)	6	Matt Cain, SF (W, 1–0)	7.2
2010 World Series	Game 3	October 30	Jonathan Sánchez, SF (L, 0–1)	4.2	Colby Lewis, TEX (W, 1–0)	7.2
2010 World Series	Game 4	October 31	Madison Bumgarner, SF (W, 1–0)	8	Tommy Hunter, TEX (L, 0–1)	4
2010 World Series	Game 5	November 1	Tim Lincecum, SF (W, 2–0)	8	Cliff Lee, TEX (L, 2–2)	7
2011 World Series	Game 1	October 19	C. J. Wilson, TEX (L, 0–2)	5.2	Chris Carpenter, STL (W, 2–0)	6
2011 World Series	Game 2	October 20	Colby Lewis, TEX	6.2	Jaime García, STL	7
2011 World Series	Game 3	October 22	Kyle Lohse, STL	3	Matt Harrison, TEX (L, 0–1)	3.2
2011 World Series	Game 4	October 23	Edwin Jackson, STL (L, 0–1)	5.1	Derek Holland, TEX (W, 1–0)	8.1
2011 World Series	Game 5	October 24	Chris Carpenter, STL	7	C. J. Wilson, TEX	5.1
2011 World Series	Game 6	October 27	Colby Lewis, TEX	5.1	Jaime García, STL	3
2011 World Series	Game 7	October 28	Matt Harrison, TEX (L, 0–2)	4	Chris Carpenter, STL (W, 3–0)	6
2012 World Series	Game 1	October 24	Justin Verlander, DET (L, 0–3)	4	Barry Zito, SF (W, 1–0)	5.2
2012 World Series	Game 2	October 25	Doug Fister, DET (L, 0–1)	6	Madison Bumgarner, SF (W, 2–0)	7
2012 World Series	Game 3	October 27	Ryan Vogelsong, SF (W, 1–0)	5.2	Aníbal Sánchez, DET (L, 0–1)	7
2012 World Series	Game 4	October 28	Matt Cain, SF	7	Max Scherzer, DET	6.1
2013 World Series	Game 1	October 23	Adam Wainwright, STL (L, 0–1)	5	Jon Lester, BOS (W, 2–0)	7.2
2013 World Series	Game 2	October 24	Michael Wacha, STL (W, 1–0)	6	John Lackey, BOS (L, 1–1)	6.1
2013 World Series	Game 3	October 26	Jake Peavy, BOS	4	Joe Kelly, STL	5.1
2013 World Series	Game 4	October 27	Clay Buchholz, BOS	4	Lance Lynn, STL (L, 0–1)	5.2
2013 World Series	Game 5	October 28	Jon Lester, BOS (W, 3–0)	7.2	Adam Wainwright, STL (L, 0–2)	7
2013 World Series	Game 6	October 30	Michael Wacha, STL (L, 1–1)	3.2	John Lackey, BOS (W, 2–1)	6.2
2014 World Series	Game 1	October 21	Madison Bumgarner, SF (W, 3–0)	7	James Shields, KC (L, 1–1)	3
2014 World Series	Game 2	October 22	Jake Peavy, SF (L, 0–1)	5	Yordano Ventura, KC	5.1
2014 World Series	Game 3	October 24	Jeremy Guthrie, KC (W, 1–0)	5	Tim Hudson, SF (L, 0–1)	5.2
2014 World Series	Game 4	October 25	Jason Vargas, KC	4	Ryan Vogelsong, SF	2.2
2014 World Series	Game 5	October 26	James Shields, KC (L, 1–2)	6	Madison Bumgarner, SF (W, 4–0)	**9**
2014 World Series	Game 6	October 28	Jake Peavy, SF (L, 0–2)	1.1	Yordano Ventura, KC (W, 1–0)	7
2014 World Series	Game 7	October 29	Tim Hudson, SF	1.2	Jeremy Guthrie, KC (L, 1–1)	3.1
2015 World Series	Game 1	October 27	Matt Harvey, NYM	6	Edinson Vólquez, KC	6
2015 World Series	Game 2	October 28	Jacob deGrom, NYM (L, 0–1)	5	Johnny Cueto, KC (W, 1–0)	**9**
2015 World Series	Game 3	October 30	Yordano Ventura, KC (L, 1–1)	3.1	Noah Syndergaard, NYM (W, 1–0)	6
2015 World Series	Game 4	October 31	Chris Young, KC	4	Steven Matz, NYM	5
2015 World Series	Game 5	November 1	Edinson Vólquez, KC	6	Matt Harvey, NYM	8
2016 World Series	Game 1	October 25	Jon Lester, CHC (L, 3–1)	5.2	Corey Kluber, CLE (W, 1–0)	6
2016 World Series	Game 2	October 26	Jake Arrieta, CHC (W, 1–0)	5.2	Trevor Bauer, CLE (L, 0–1)	3.2
2016 World Series	Game 3	October 28	Josh Tomlin, CLE	4.2	Kyle Hendricks, CHC	4.1
2016 World Series	Game 4	October 29	Corey Kluber, CLE (W, 2–0)	6	John Lackey, CHC (L, 2–2)	5
2016 World Series	Game 5	October 30	Trevor Bauer, CLE (L, 0–2)	4	Jon Lester, CHC (W, 4–1)	6
2016 World Series	Game 6	November 1	Jake Arrieta, CHC (W, 2–0)	5.2	Josh Tomlin, CLE (L, 0–1)	2.1
2016 World Series	Game 7	November 2	Kyle Hendricks, CHC	4.2	Corey Kluber, CLE	4
2017 World Series	Game 1	October 24	Dallas Keuchel, HOU (L, 0–1)	6.2	Clayton Kershaw, LAD (W, 1–0)	7
2017 World Series	Game 2	October 25	Justin Verlander, HOU	6	Rich Hill, LAD	4
2017 World Series	Game 3	October 27	Yu Darvish, LAD (L, 0–1)	1.2	Lance McCullers Jr., HOU (W, 1–0)	5.1
2017 World Series	Game 4	October 28	Alex Wood, LAD	5.2	Charlie Morton, HOU	6.1
2017 World Series	Game 5	October 29	Clayton Kershaw, LAD	4.2	Dallas Keuchel, HOU	3.2
2017 World Series	Game 6	October 31	Justin Verlander, HOU (L, 0–4)	6	Rich Hill, LAD	4.2
2017 World Series	Game 7	November 1	Lance McCullers Jr., HOU	2.1	Yu Darvish, LAD (L, 0–2)	1.2
2018 World Series	Game 1	October 23	Clayton Kershaw, LAD (L, 1–1)	4	Chris Sale, BOS	4
2018 World Series	Game 2	October 24	Hyun-jin Ryu, LAD (L, 0–1)	4.2	David Price, BOS (W, 1–0)	6
2018 World Series	Game 3	October 26	Rick Porcello, BOS	4.2	Walker Buehler, LAD	7
2018 World Series	Game 4	October 27	Eduardo Rodríguez, BOS	5.2	Rich Hill, LAD	6.1
2018 World Series	Game 5	October 28	David Price, BOS (W, 2–0)	7	Clayton Kershaw, LAD (L, 1–2)	7
2019 World Series	Game 1	October 22	Max Scherzer, WSH (W, 1–0)	5	Gerrit Cole, HOU (L, 0–1)	7
2019 World Series	Game 2	October 23	Stephen Strasburg, WSH (W, 1–0)	6	Justin Verlander, HOU (L, 0–5)	6
2019 World Series	Game 3	October 25	Zack Greinke, HOU	4.2	Aníbal Sánchez, WSH (L, 0–2)	5.1
2019 World Series	Game 4	October 26	José Urquidy, HOU (W, 1–0)	5	Patrick Corbin, WSH (L, 0–1)	6
2019 World Series	Game 5	October 27	Gerrit Cole, HOU (W, 1–1)	7	Joe Ross, WSH (L, 0–1)	5
2019 World Series	Game 6	October 29	Stephen Strasburg, WSH (W, 2–0)	8.1	Justin Verlander, HOU (L, 0–6)	5
2019 World Series	Game 7	October 30	Max Scherzer, WSH	5	Zack Greinke, HOU	6.1

=== 2020s ===
World Series	Game	Game date	Visiting starting pitcher	IP	Home starting pitcher	IP
2020 World Series	Game 1	October 20	Tyler Glasnow, TB (L, 0–1)	4.1	Clayton Kershaw, LAD (W, 2–2)	6
2020 World Series	Game 2	October 21	Blake Snell, TB	4.2	Tony Gonsolin, LAD (L, 0–1)	1.1
2020 World Series	Game 3	October 23	Walker Buehler, LAD (W, 1–0)	6	Charlie Morton, TB (L, 0–1)	4.1
2020 World Series	Game 4	October 24	Julio Urías, LAD	4.2	Ryan Yarbrough, TB	3.1
2020 World Series	Game 5	October 25	Clayton Kershaw, LAD (W, 3–2)	5.2	Tyler Glasnow, TB (L, 0–2)	5
2020 World Series	Game 6	October 27	Blake Snell, TB	5.1	Tony Gonsolin, LAD	1.2
2021 World Series	Game 1	October 26	Charlie Morton, ATL	2.1	Framber Valdez, HOU (L, 0–1)	2
2021 World Series	Game 2	October 27	Max Fried, ATL (L, 0–1)	5	José Urquidy, HOU (W, 2–0)	5
2021 World Series	Game 3	October 29	Luis García, HOU (L, 0–1)	3.2	Ian Anderson, ATL (W, 1–0)	5
2021 World Series	Game 4	October 30	Zack Greinke, HOU	4	Dylan Lee, ATL	0.1
2021 World Series	Game 5	October 31	Framber Valdez, HOU	2.2	Tucker Davidson, ATL	2
2021 World Series	Game 6	November 2	Max Fried, ATL (W, 1–1)	6	Luis García, HOU (L, 0–2)	2.2
2022 World Series	Game 1	October 28	Aaron Nola, PHI	4.1	Justin Verlander, HOU	5
2022 World Series	Game 2	October 29	Zack Wheeler, PHI (L, 0–1)	5	Framber Valdez, HOU (W, 1–1)	6.1
2022 World Series	Game 3	November 1	Lance McCullers Jr., HOU (L, 1–1)	4.1	Ranger Suárez, PHI (W, 1–0)	5
2022 World Series	Game 4	November 2	Cristian Javier, HOU (W, 1–0)	6	Aaron Nola, PHI (L, 0–1)	4
2022 World Series	Game 5	November 3	Justin Verlander, HOU (W, 1–6)	5	Noah Syndergaard, PHI (L, 1–1)	3
2022 World Series	Game 6	November 5	Zack Wheeler, PHI (L, 0–2)	5.1	Framber Valdez, HOU (W, 2–1)	6
2023 World Series	Game 1	October 27	Zac Gallen, AZ	5	Nathan Eovaldi, TEX	4.2
2023 World Series	Game 2	October 28	Merrill Kelly, AZ (W, 1–0)	7	Jordan Montgomery, TEX (L, 0–1)	6
2023 World Series	Game 3	October 30	Max Scherzer, TEX	3	Brandon Pfaadt, AZ (L, 0–1)	5.1
2023 World Series	Game 4	October 31	Andrew Heaney, TEX (W, 1–0)	5	Joe Mantiply, AZ (L, 0–1)	1.1
2023 World Series	Game 5	November 1	Nathan Eovaldi, TEX (W, 1–0)	6	Zac Gallen, AZ (L, 0–1)	6.1
2024 World Series	Game 1	October 25	Gerrit Cole, NYY	6	Jack Flaherty, LAD	5.1
2024 World Series	Game 2	October 26	Carlos Rodón, NYY (L, 0–1)	3.1	Yoshinobu Yamamoto, LAD (W, 1–0)	6.1
2024 World Series	Game 3	October 28	Walker Buehler, LAD (W, 2–0)	5	Clarke Schmidt, NYY (L, 0–1)	2.2
2024 World Series	Game 4	October 29	Ben Casparius, LAD	2	Luis Gil, NYY	4
2024 World Series	Game 5	October 30	Jack Flaherty, LAD	1.1	Gerrit Cole, NYY	6.2
2025 World Series	Game 1	October 24	Blake Snell, LAD (L, 0–1)	5	Trey Yesavage, TOR	4
2025 World Series	Game 2	October 25	Yoshinobu Yamamoto, LAD (W, 2–0)	**9**	Kevin Gausman, TOR (L, 0–1)	6.2
2025 World Series	Game 3	October 27	Max Scherzer, TOR	4.1	Tyler Glasnow, LAD	4.2
2025 World Series	Game 4	October 28	Shane Bieber, TOR (W, 1–0)	5.1	Shohei Ohtani, LAD (L, 0–1)	6
2025 World Series	Game 5	October 29	Trey Yesavage, TOR (W, 1–0)	7	Blake Snell, LAD (L, 0–2)	6.2
2025 World Series	Game 6	October 31	Yoshinobu Yamamoto, LAD (W, 3–0)	6	Kevin Gausman, TOR (L, 0–2)	6
2025 World Series	Game 7	November 1	Shohei Ohtani, LAD	2.1	Max Scherzer, TOR	4.1
2026 World Series	Game 1	October 23	Nick Martinez, TB (L, 0–1)	5	Jacob Misiorowski, MIL (W, 1–0)	5
2026 World Series	Game 2	October 24	Drew Rasmussen, TB	3.2	Logan Henderson, MIL	3
2026 World Series	Game 3	October 26	Robert Gasser, MIL (W, 1–0)	6	Freddy Peralta, TB (L, 0–1)	4.2
2026 World Series	Game 4	October 27	Dustin May, MIL	3	Griffin Jax, TB	4
2026 World Series	Game 5	October 28	Jacob Misiorowski, MIL (W, 2–0)	5.2	Drew Rasmussen, TB (L, 0–1)	4
