= 1917 World Series =

1917 Major League Baseball championship series

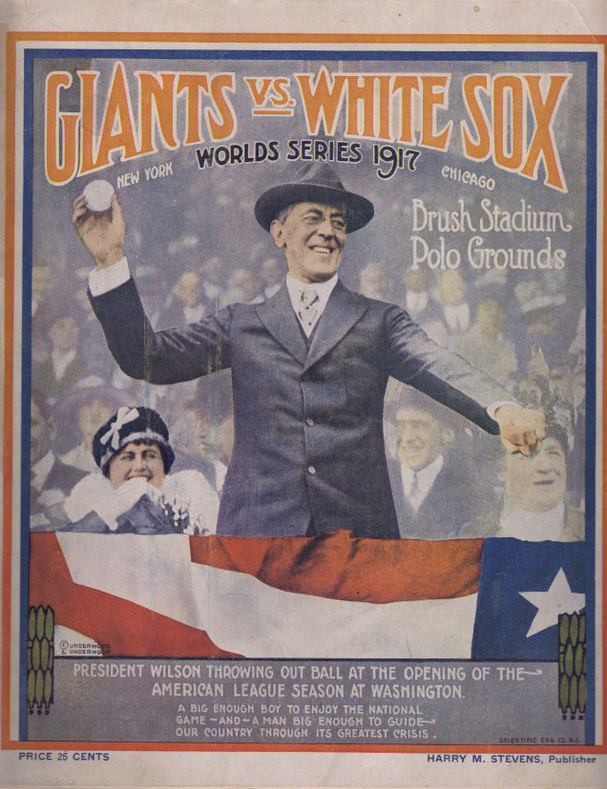
- A program from the 1917 World Series, depicting then U.S. president Woodrow Wilson
Team (Wins)	Managers	Season
Chicago White Sox (4)	Pants Rowland	100–54, .649, GA: 9
New York Giants (2)	John McGraw	98–56, .636, GA: 10
- Dates: October 6–15
- Venue(s): Comiskey Park (Chicago); Brush Stadium (New York)
- Umpires: Silk O'Loughlin (AL), Bill Klem (NL); Billy Evans (AL), Cy Rigler (NL)
- Hall of Famers: Umpires: Bill Klem; Billy Evans; Chicago White Sox: Eddie Collins; Red Faber; Ray Schalk; Giants: John McGraw (mgr.)

The 1917 World Series was the championship series of Major League Baseball's (MLB) 1917 season. The 14th edition of the World Series, it was a best-of-seven playoff between the American League (AL) champion Chicago White Sox and the National League (NL) champion New York Giants. The White Sox won the series in six games. The series was played against the backdrop of World War I, which dominated American newspapers both that year and the next.

The strong Chicago White Sox club finished the 1917 season with a 100–54 record, which remains their only 100-win season in franchise history to date. Their next World Series-winning team in 2005 finished the regular season with a 99–63 record.

The Sox won Game 1 of the Series in Chicago 2–1 behind a complete game by Eddie Cicotte. Happy Felsch hit a home run in the fourth inning that provided the winning margin. In Game 2 the Sox beat the Giants 7–2 behind another complete game effort by Red Faber to take a 2–0 lead in the Series.

Back in New York for Game 3, Cicotte again threw a complete game, but the Sox could not muster a single run against Giants' starter Rube Benton and lost 2–0. In Game 4 the Sox were shut out again 5–0 by Ferdie Schupp. Faber threw another complete game, but the Series was even at 2–2 going back to Chicago.

Reb Russell started Game 5 in Chicago, but only faced three batters before giving way to Cicotte. Going into the bottom of the seventh inning, Chicago was down 5–2, but they rallied to score three in the seventh and three in the eighth to win 8–5. Faber pitched the final two innings for the win. In Game 6 the Sox took an early 3–0 lead and on the strength of another complete-game victory from Faber (his third of the Series) won 4–2 and clinched the World Championship. Eddie Collins was the hitting hero, batting .409 over the six-game series while Cicotte and Faber combined to pitch 50 out of a total 52 World Series innings to lead the staff.

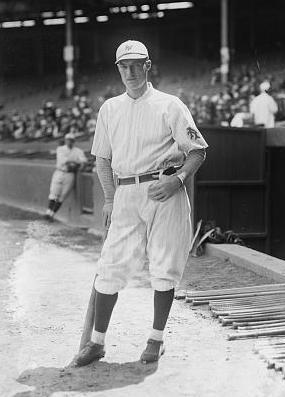
Heinie Zimmerman

The decisive game underscored the Giants' post-season frustrations, featuring a famous rundown in which Giants' third baseman Heinie Zimmerman futilely chased the speedy Eddie Collins toward home plate with what would be the Series-winning run. Catcher Bill Rariden had run up the third base line to start a rundown, expecting pitcher Rube Benton or first baseman Walter Holke to cover the plate. However, neither of them budged, forcing Zimmerman to chase Collins while pawing helplessly in the air with the ball in an attempt to tag him. Two years before the issue of baseball betting reached its peak, Zimmerman found himself having to publicly deny purposely allowing the run to score, i.e. to deny that he had "thrown" the game. In truth, McGraw blamed Benton and Holke for failing to cover the plate. A quote often attributed to Zim, but actually invented by writer Ring Lardner some years later, was that when asked about the incident Zim replied, "Who the hell was I supposed to throw to, Klem (umpire Bill Klem, who was working the plate)?" Conventional wisdom has it that Collins was much faster than Zimmerman, but existing photos of the play show that Zimmerman was only a step or two behind Collins, who actually slid across the plate while Zim jumped over him to avoid trampling him. Zimmerman would eventually be banned for life due to various accusations of corruption.

The great athlete Jim Thorpe, better known for football in general, made his only World Series "appearance" during Game 5, where he was listed in the lineup card as starting in right field; but for his turn at bat in the top of the first inning he was replaced by a left-handed hitting Dave Robertson.

The White Sox, who were essentially dismantled following the 1920 season by baseball commissioner Kenesaw Mountain Landis due to the Black Sox Scandal in the 1919 World Series, did not make it to another World Series until 1959, and did not win another World Series until 2005.

This was the first of nine meetings between teams from Chicago and New York City for a major professional sports championship. This later occurred in two more World Series (1932, 1938), and six NFL Championship games (1933, 1934, 1941, 1946, 1956, 1963).

== Summary ==
AL Chicago White Sox (4) vs. NL New York Giants (2)

Game	Date	Score	Location	Time	Attendance
1	October 6	New York Giants – 1, Chicago White Sox – 2	Comiskey Park	1:48	32,000
2	October 7	New York Giants – 2, Chicago White Sox – 7	Comiskey Park	2:13	32,000
3	October 10	Chicago White Sox – 0, New York Giants – 2	Brush Stadium	1:55	33,616
4	October 11	Chicago White Sox – 0, New York Giants – 5	Brush Stadium	2:09	27,746
5	October 13	New York Giants – 5, Chicago White Sox – 8	Comiskey Park	2:37	27,323
6	October 15	Chicago White Sox – 4, New York Giants – 2	Brush Stadium	2:18	33,969

== Matchups ==
=== Game 1 ===
Saturday, October 6, 1917 2:00 pm (CT) at Comiskey Park in Chicago, Illinois
Team	1	2	3	4	5	6	7	8	9	R	H	E
New York	0	0	0	0	1	0	0	0	0	1	7	1
Chicago	0	0	1	1	0	0	0	0	X	2	7	1
WP: Eddie Cicotte (1–0) LP: Slim Sallee (0–1); Home runs: NYG: None; CWS: Happy Felsch (1)

Fred McMullin drove in Chicago's first run, and Happy Felsch's homer made it 2–0. Giants pitcher Slim Sallee knocked in his side's only run with a single after a Lew McCarty triple.

=== Game 2 ===
Sunday, October 7, 1917 2:00 pm (CT) at Comiskey Park in Chicago, Illinois
Team	1	2	3	4	5	6	7	8	9	R	H	E
New York	0	2	0	0	0	0	0	0	0	2	8	1
Chicago	0	2	0	5	0	0	0	0	X	7	14	1
WP: Red Faber (1–0) LP: Fred Anderson (0–1)

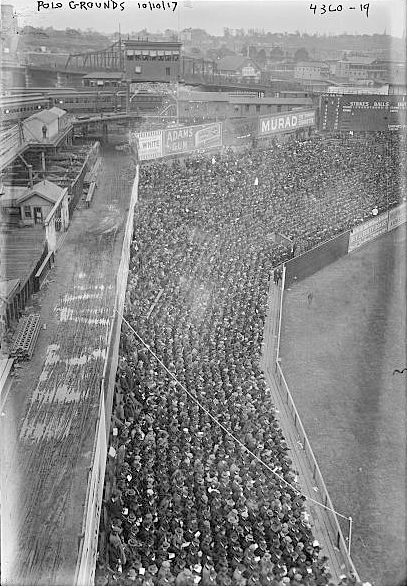
Game 3 at the Polo Grounds, taken from left end of upper deck. Note rope to guide umpire on home run calls.

Shoeless Joe Jackson's two-run single capped a five-run fourth inning for the White Sox, who knocked out Giants starter Ferdie Schupp in the second inning.

=== Game 3 ===
Wednesday, October 10, 1917 2:00 pm (ET) at Brush Stadium in Manhattan, New York
Team	1	2	3	4	5	6	7	8	9	R	H	E
Chicago	0	0	0	0	0	0	0	0	0	0	5	3
New York	0	0	0	2	0	0	0	0	X	2	8	2
WP: Rube Benton (1–0) LP: Eddie Cicotte (1–1)

The home team won for the third straight time as the series moved to New York. The only runs of a snappy 1 hour, 55 minute game came on a Dave Robertson triple, Walter Holke double and a single by George Burns.

=== Game 4 ===
Thursday, October 11, 1917 2:00 pm (ET) at Brush Stadium in Manhattan, New York
Team	1	2	3	4	5	6	7	8	9	R	H	E
Chicago	0	0	0	0	0	0	0	0	0	0	7	0
New York	0	0	0	1	1	0	1	2	X	5	10	1
WP: Ferdie Schupp (1–0) LP: Red Faber (1–1); Home runs: CWS: None; NYG: Benny Kauff 2 (2)

The first of a pair of homers by Giants center fielder Benny Kauff was an inside-the-park one that sailed over Sox center fielder Happy Felsch's head. The other came in the eighth off Chicago reliever Dave Danforth.

=== Game 5 ===
Saturday, October 13, 1917 2:00 pm (CT) at Comiskey Park in Chicago, Illinois
Team	1	2	3	4	5	6	7	8	9	R	H	E
New York	2	0	0	2	0	0	1	0	0	5	12	3
Chicago	0	0	1	0	0	1	3	3	X	8	14	6
WP: Red Faber (2–1) LP: Slim Sallee (0–2)

Even though Red Faber would start Games 4 and 6, he was brought in from the bullpen to close Game 5. Taking no chances, the Sox yanked starter Reb Russell after just three batters, all of whom reached base. A three-error third inning behind Eddie Cicotte put the Giants up 4–1. But after a game-tying rally in the seventh, the Sox won it in the eighth as Happy Felsch greeted reliever Pol Perritt with an RBI single. It was the fifth straight win by the home team in this Series.

=== Game 6 ===
Monday, October 15, 1917 2:00 pm (ET) at Brush Stadium in Manhattan, New York
Team	1	2	3	4	5	6	7	8	9	R	H	E
Chicago	0	0	0	3	0	0	0	0	1	4	7	1
New York	0	0	0	0	2	0	0	0	0	2	6	3
WP: Red Faber (3–1) LP: Rube Benton (1–1)

A pair of errors proved costly to the Giants in a three-run fourth when Chick Gandil and Ray Schalk followed with RBI hits. New York's hopes rose with a Buck Herzog triple in the next inning that made it 3–2. But with the workhorse Faber holding the Giants at bay the rest of the way, the Sox got an insurance run in the ninth on hits by Buck Weaver and Nemo Leibold, and the Series was theirs. It would be their last championship until 2005.

== Composite box ==
1917 World Series (4–2): Chicago White Sox (A.L.) over New York Giants (N.L.)

Team	1	2	3	4	5	6	7	8	9	R	H	E
Chicago White Sox	0	2	2	9	0	1	3	3	1	21	54	12
New York Giants	2	2	0	5	4	0	2	2	0	17	51	11
Total attendance: 186,654 Average attendance: 31,109; Winning player's share: $3,669 Losing player's share: $2,442
