= Rube Benton =

American baseball player (1890–1937)

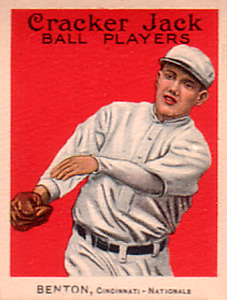
- Pitcher
- Born: June 27, 1890; Clinton, North Carolina, U.S.
- Died: December 12, 1937 (aged 47); Dothan, Alabama, U.S.
- Batted: Left Threw: Left

MLB debut
- June 28, 1910, for the Cincinnati Reds

Last MLB appearance
- September 21, 1925, for the Cincinnati Reds

MLB statistics
- Win–loss record: 150–144
- Earned run average: 3.09
- Strikeouts: 950
- Stats at Baseball Reference

Teams
- Cincinnati Reds (1910–1915); New York Giants (1915–1921); Cincinnati Reds (1923–1925)

John Cleave "Rube" Benton (June 27, 1890 – December 12, 1937) was an American pitcher for Major League Baseball's Cincinnati Reds (1910–15, 1923–25) and New York Giants (1915–21). He pitched in the minor leagues for the Minneapolis Millers of the American Association through 1933. Benton, who had survived serious automobile accidents in 1913 and 1930, was killed in another auto accident in 1937.

== Career ==
=== Cincinnati Reds ===
Benton's major league career began in June 1910, when his contract was purchased by the Cincinnati Reds for $7,000 from Macon of the South Atlantic League. He pitched in 18 games for the Reds in 1910 and 1911 combined. In 1912, Benton led the league in games pitched (50), games started (39), batters faced (1302), and batters hit by pitch (18); he finished that season with an 18–20 win–loss record.

In 1913, Benton was riding a motorcycle at high speeds when he collided with a trolley. He sustained a broken jaw, cuts and bruises. He recovered from his injuries but was suspended by the team for the remainder of the year, and a wild lifestyle and drinking affected most of the rest of his career. In 1914, he did straighten up his behavior for a year after signing a contract with a clause that involved abstaining from alcohol and tobacco. His 1914 ERA of 2.96 represented a decrease of 0.54 points from the previous season; his win–loss record was 16–18, but his 16 victories came with a team that only won 60 games overall.

=== New York Giants ===
In August 1915, Benton's contract was purchased by the Giants for $3,000. He pitched for the New York until 1921; the team won the 1917 National League pennant and the 1921 World Series. Benton threw a shutout against the Chicago White Sox in Game 3 of the 1917 World Series, but was the losing pitcher in Game 6 on the final day of the Series. He pitched for the Giants in the 1921 season but did not make an appearance in that World Series, which the Giants won in eight games over the Yankees.

=== Return to the Reds ===
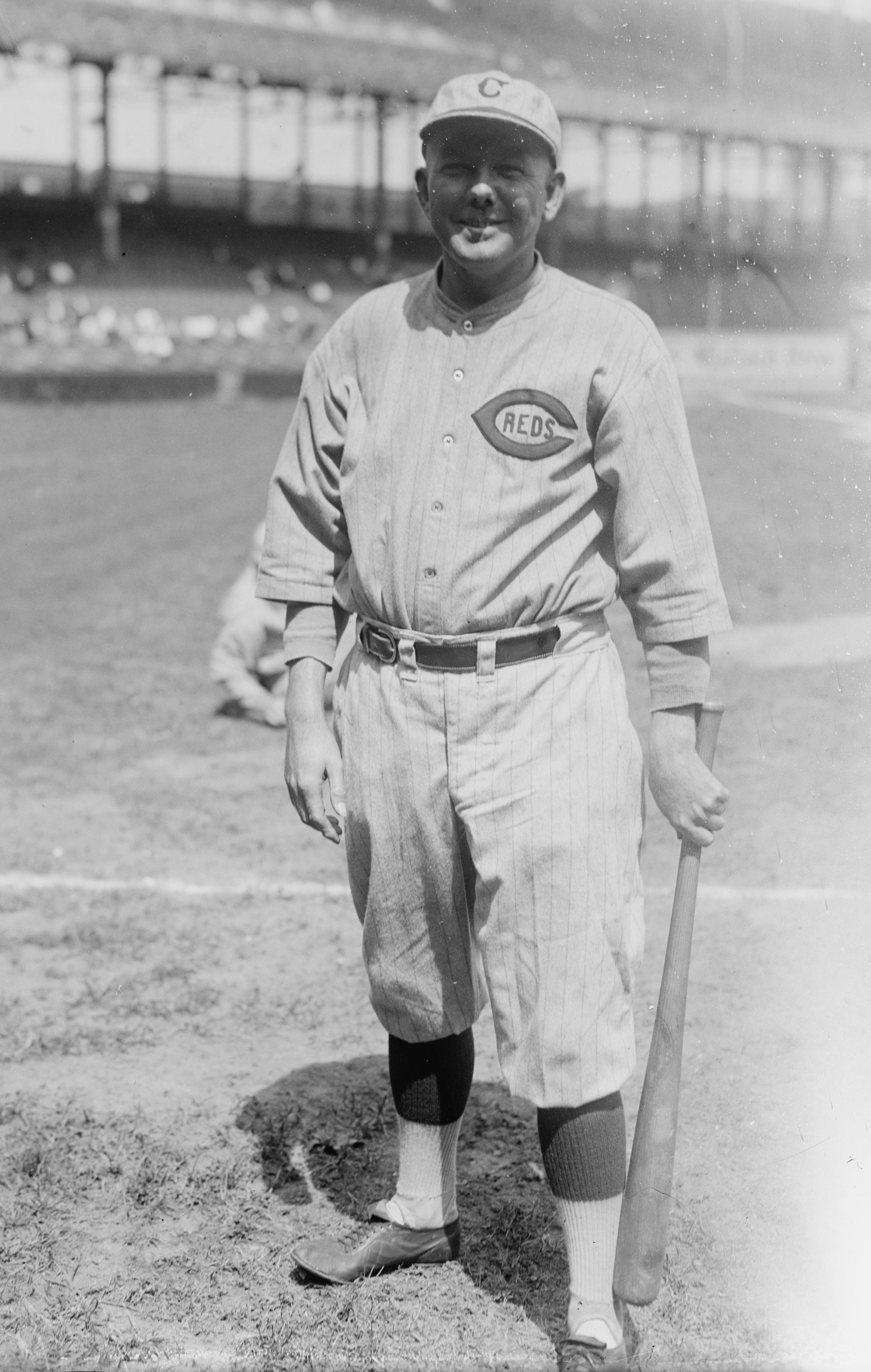
Benton with the Reds in 1923

The Reds purchased Benton from New York in 1922, and he remained with the team until he left the major leagues after the 1925 season. In 15 seasons he had a 150–144 win–loss record, 437 games, 305 games started, 145 complete games, 24 shutouts, 83 games finished, 21 saves, 2,517 1/3 innings, 2,472 hits allowed, 712 walks, 950 strikeouts, and a 3.09 ERA.

== Later life ==
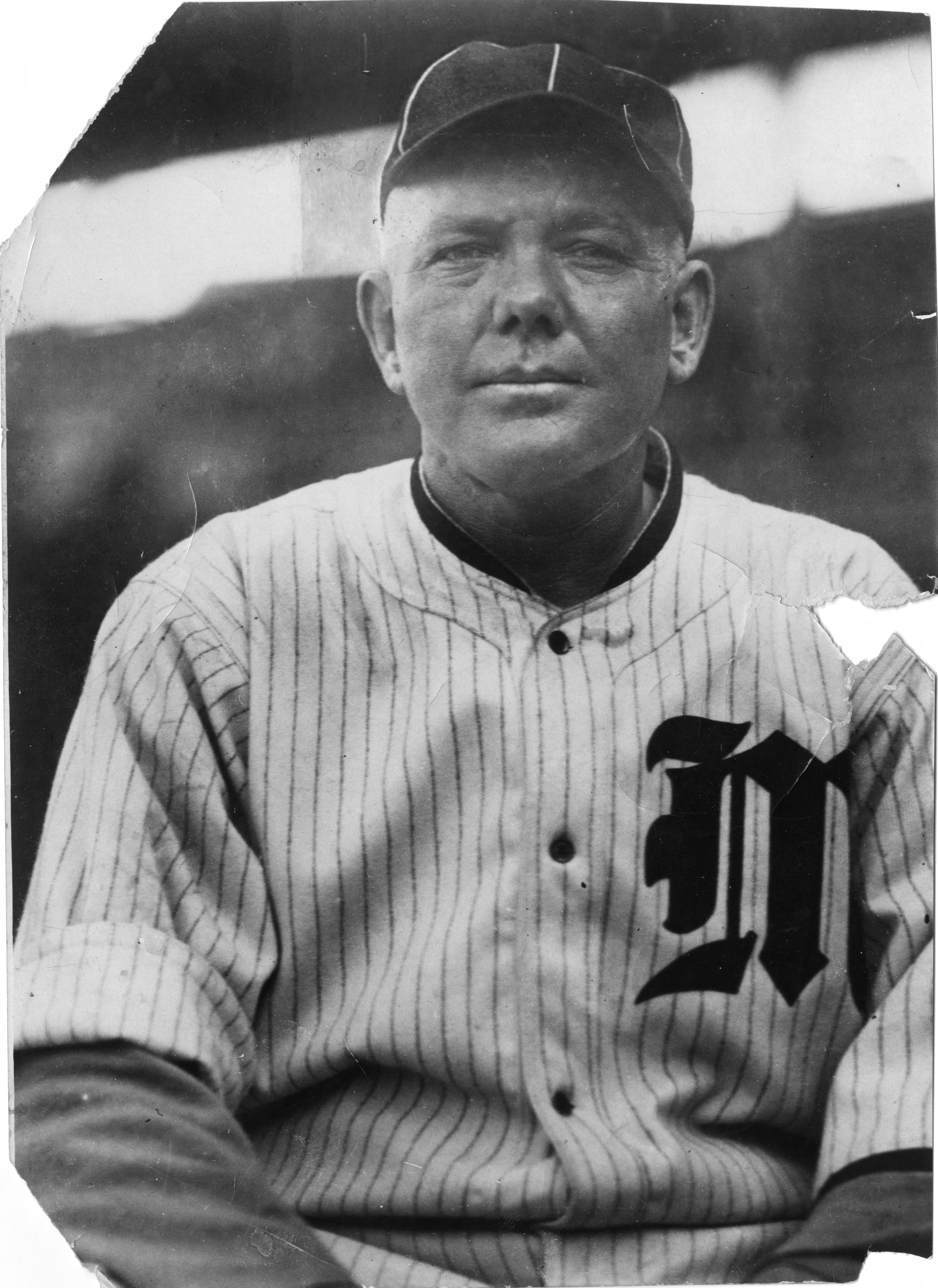
Rube Benton in Minneapolis, ca. 1932

After his major league days, he went to the American Association and pitched for Minneapolis through 1933. In November 1930, Benton was involved in a rollover automobile accident. Initially, there was concern that Benton would not recover. He was unconscious for three days, had a fractured skull, and had surgery on both hands, but he recovered in time to pitch in the 1931 season.

He died in an automobile accident in 1937 in Dothan, Alabama.

== See also ==
- List of Major League Baseball career hit batsmen leaders
