= Reb Russell =

American baseball player (1889–1973)

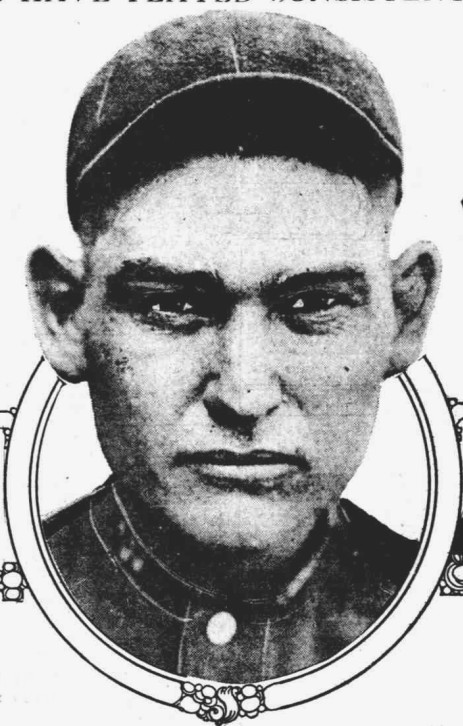
- Pitcher / Outfielder
- Born: March 12, 1889; Jackson, Mississippi, U.S.
- Died: September 30, 1973 (aged 84); Indianapolis, Indiana, U.S.
- Batted: Left Threw: Left

MLB debut
- April 18, 1913, for the Chicago White Sox

Last MLB appearance
- September 30, 1923, for the Pittsburgh Pirates

MLB statistics
- Win–loss record: 80–59
- Earned run average: 2.33
- Strikeouts: 495
- Stats at Baseball Reference

Teams
- Chicago White Sox (1913–1919); Pittsburgh Pirates (1922–1923)

Career highlights and awards
- World Series champion (1917)

Ewell Albert "Reb" Russell (March 12, 1889 – September 30, 1973) was an American professional baseball player. He played in Major League Baseball for the Chicago White Sox and the Pittsburgh Pirates.

== Career ==
=== MLB ===
Russell was drafted by the White Sox as a pitcher in 1912. In his rookie season, his won-loss record was 22–16 and he led the league in games pitched, with 52. The lefty had a sterling 1.90 ERA while leading the team in innings pitched (316 2/3) and wins. Only Washington's ace Walter Johnson topped Reb's eight shutouts, and Russell tied a record that still stands with five 1–0 victories in a season.

In 1916, he was Chicago's opening day starter; that year he led the team in wins (18), innings (264 1/3), and shutouts (5), and led the league in fewest walks allowed per inning.

Russell helped the White Sox win the 1917 American League pennant, with a won-loss record of 15–5 and an ERA of 1.95. He was the starting pitcher of Game 5 of the 1917 World Series, but was unable to retire a batter and was replaced in the first inning by Eddie Cicotte.

Russell developed arm trouble in 1918 and, after a poor start, was released by Chicago.

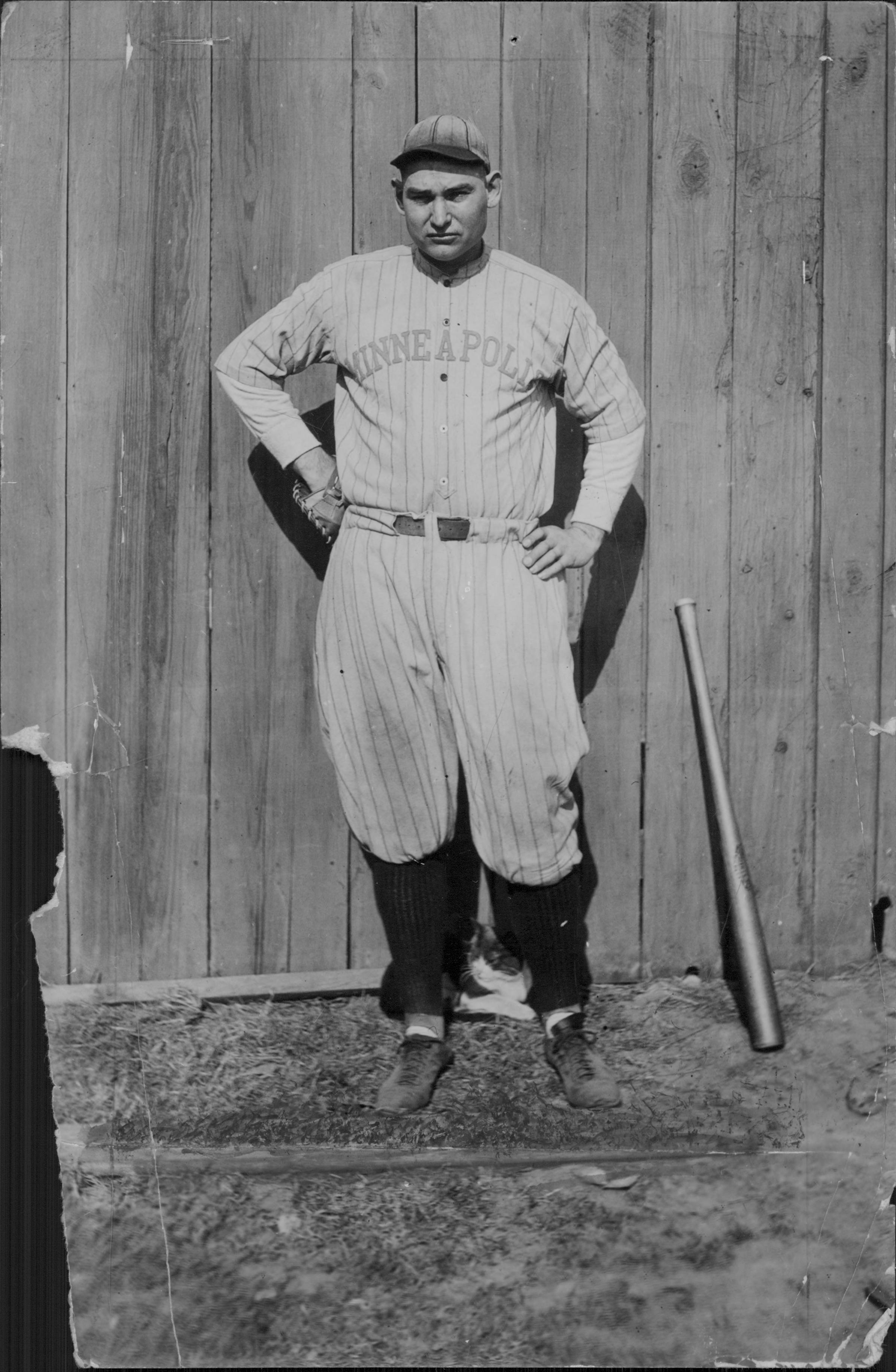
Reb Russell with the minor league Minneapolis Millers, 1920's

=== Minor leagues and brief return to MLB ===
However, in the minor leagues the decent-hitting Russell converted to playing the outfield and returned to the majors in 1922, playing with the Pittsburgh Pirates. That year, he batted .368 with 12 home runs and 75 RBI in 60 games. On being released at the end of the 1923 season he returned to the minor league American Association (the highest level of minor league play in his era). Russell remained a highly paid star in the AA through age 40, and won the league batting title (.385) when he was 38 years old.

== External links and references ==
- Career statistics from Baseball Reference · Baseball Reference (Minors) · Retrosheet · Baseball Almanac
- Biography at SABR's Baseball Biography Project
