= Ferdie Schupp =

American baseball player (1891–1971)

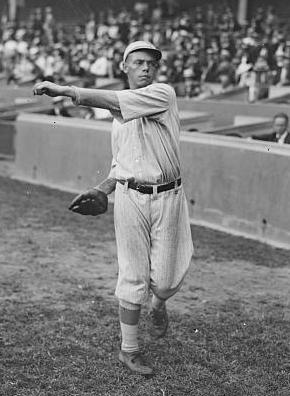
- Pitcher
- Born: January 16, 1891; Louisville, Kentucky, U.S.
- Died: December 16, 1971 (aged 80); Los Angeles, California, U.S.
- Batted: Right Threw: Left

MLB debut
- August 19, 1913, for the New York Giants

Last MLB appearance
- July 27, 1922, for the Chicago White Sox

MLB statistics
- Win–loss record: 61–39
- Earned run average: 3.32
- Strikeouts: 553
- Stats at Baseball Reference

Teams
- New York Giants (1913–1919); St. Louis Cardinals (1919–1921); Brooklyn Robins (1921); Chicago White Sox (1922)

Ferdinand Maurice Schupp (January 16, 1891 – December 16, 1971), born in Louisville, Kentucky, was an American pitcher for the New York Giants (1913–19), St. Louis Cardinals (1919–21), Brooklyn Robins (1921) and Chicago White Sox (1922).

In 10 seasons he had a 61–39 win–loss record, 216 games, 120 games started, 62 complete games, 11 shutouts, 70 games finished, 6 saves, 1,054 innings pitched, 938 hits allowed, 470 runs allowed, 389 earned runs allowed, 30 home runs allowed, 464 walks allowed, 553 strikeouts, 33 hit batsmen, 24 wild pitches, 4,463 batters faced, 1 balk and a 3.32 ERA.

In 1916 Schupp allowed only 5.07 hits per 9 innings pitched in 140.1 IP with a microscopic 0.90 ERA but fell short of leading in both those categories as he fell short of the qualifier of 1 inning pitched per scheduled game.

Schupp led the National League in won–loss % (.750) and hits allowed per 9 innings pitched (6.68) in 1917. He led the National League in walks allowed (127) in 1920. He helped the Giants win the 1913 and 1917 National League pennant.

He died in Los Angeles at the age of 80.

== Sources ==
- Career statistics from Baseball Reference · Baseball Reference (Minors) · Retrosheet · Baseball Almanac
