= List of Major League Baseball career WHIP leaders =

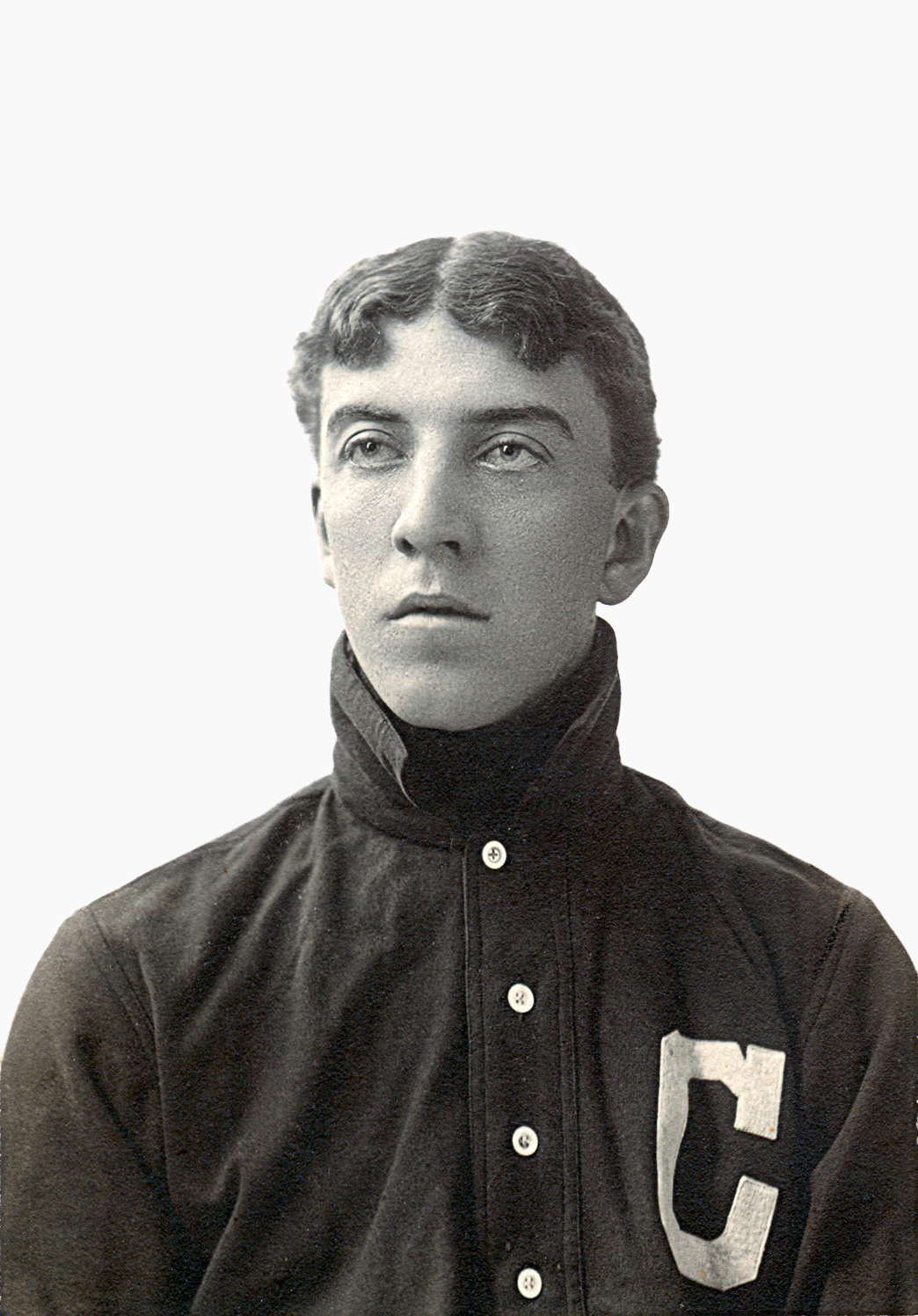
Addie Joss, the all-time leader in career WHIP.

In baseball statistics, walks plus hits per inning pitched (WHIP) is a sabermetric measurement of the number of baserunners a pitcher has allowed per inning pitched. WHIP reflects a pitcher's propensity for allowing batters to reach base, therefore a lower WHIP indicates better performance. WHIP is calculated by adding the number of walks and hits allowed and dividing this sum by the number of innings pitched.

Below is the list of the top 100 Major League Baseball pitchers in walks plus hits per inning pitched (WHIP) with at least 1,000 innings pitched.

Addie Joss is the all-time leader with a career WHIP of 0.9678. Jacob deGrom (0.9941) and Ed Walsh (0.9996) are the only other players with a career WHIP under 1.0000.

== Key ==
**Rank**	Rank amongst leaders in career WHIP. A blank field indicates a tie.
**Player**	Name of player.
**WHIP**	Total career WHIP.
*	Denotes elected to National Baseball Hall of Fame.
**Bold**	Denotes active player. (Note: A player is considered inactive if he has announced his retirement or has not played for a full season.)

== List ==
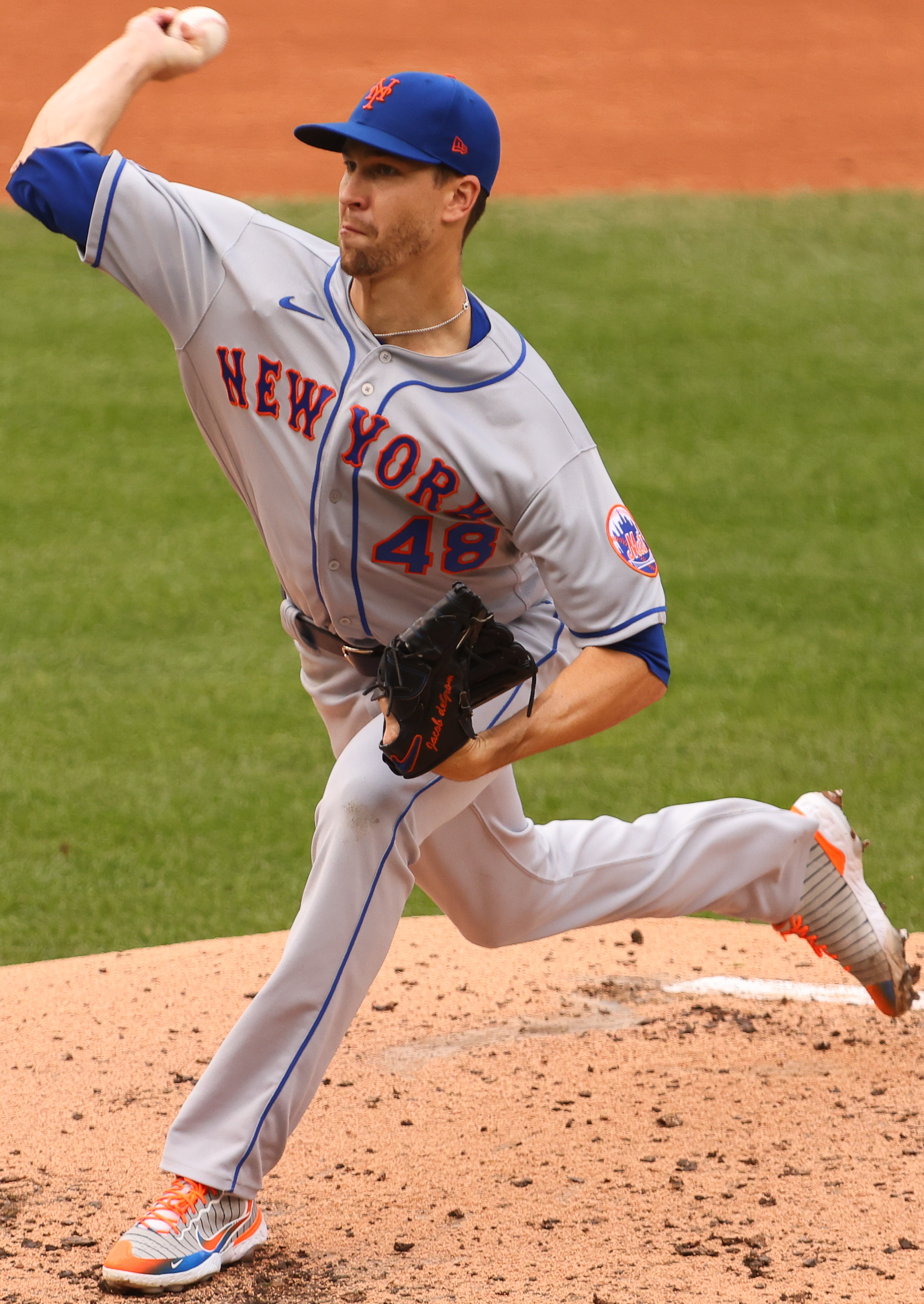
Jacob deGrom, the active leader in career WHIP and 4th all-time.

- Stats updated as of September 27, 2026.

Rank	Player	WHIP
1	Addie Joss*	0.9678
2	Ed Walsh*	0.9996
3	Mariano Rivera*	1.0003
4	**Jacob deGrom**	1.0004
5	Clayton Kershaw	1.0177
6	**Chris Sale**	1.0411
7	John Montgomery Ward*	1.0435
8	Pedro Martínez*	1.0544
9	Christy Mathewson*	1.0581
10	Trevor Hoffman*	1.0584
11	Walter Johnson*	1.0612
12	**Logan Gilbert**	1.0633
13	Mordecai Brown*	1.0658
14	Charlie Sweeney	1.0673
15	Reb Russell	1.0800
16	Jim Devlin	1.0868
17	Smoky Joe Wood	1.0869
18	Jack Pfiester	1.0887
19	**Gerrit Cole**	1.0894
20	George Bradley	1.0901
21	Tommy Bond	1.0908
22	**Max Scherzer**	1.0910
23	Babe Adams	1.0920
24	Stephen Strasburg	1.0959
25	Juan Marichal*	1.1012
	Satchel Paige*	1.1012
27	Dick Hall	1.1019
	Rube Waddell*	1.1019
29	Larry Corcoran	1.1048
30	Deacon Phillippe	1.1051
31	Sandy Koufax*	1.1061
32	Fred Glade	1.1066
33	Ed Morris	1.1075
34	Will White	1.1110
35	Chief Bender*	1.1127
36	Charlie Ferguson	1.1171
37	Terry Larkin	1.1172
38	Eddie Plank*	1.1189
39	Doc White	1.1207
40	Tom Seaver*	1.1208
41	Grover Cleveland Alexander*	1.1212
42	Tim Keefe*	1.1230
43	Hoyt Wilhelm*	1.1245
44	Corey Kluber	1.1293
45	**Zack Wheeler**	1.1294
46	Masahiro Tanaka	1.1296
	Cy Young*	1.1296
48	Frank Owen	1.1306
49	George McQuillan	1.1311
50	Hooks Wiltse	1.1315

Rank	Player	WHIP
51	Noodles Hahn	1.1319
52	Johan Santana	1.1320
53	Jim McCormick	1.1322
54	Ray Collins	1.1340
55	Catfish Hunter*	1.1341
56	Lady Baldwin	1.1347
57	Justin Verlander	1.1363
58	**Max Fried**	1.1373
59	Curt Schilling	1.1374
60	**Yu Darvish**	1.1378
61	Bruce Sutter*	1.1401
62	Bret Saberhagen	1.1406
63	Nick Altrock	1.1407
64	Sam Leever	1.1411
65	Ferguson Jenkins*	1.1418
66	Don Sutton*	1.1425
67	Greg Maddux*	1.1431
	Ed Reulbach	1.1431
69	Andy Messersmith	1.1433
70	Sid Fernandez	1.1443
71	Jeff Tesreau	1.1447
72	Gary Nolan	1.1453
73	Joe Benz	1.1466
	Jim Whitney	1.1466
75	Don Drysdale*	1.1477
76	Charles Radbourn*	1.1492
77	Barney Pelty	1.1504
78	Jack Chesbro*	1.1520
79	Tiny Bonham	1.1528
80	Fred Goldsmith	1.1530
81	Bullet Rogan*	1.1534
82	Russ Ford	1.1537
83	Eddie Cicotte	1.1544
84	Madison Bumgarner	1.1546
85	Rollie Fingers*	1.1556
86	Bob Caruthers	1.1578
87	Dick Rudolph	1.1581
88	Babe Ruth*	1.1586
89	Harry Coveleski	1.1587
90	Dennis Eckersley*	1.1608
91	Orval Overall	1.1613
92	**Freddy Peralta**	1.1618
93	David Price	1.1625
94	Denny McLain	1.1633
95	Jumbo McGinnis	1.1636
96	George Winter	1.1649
97	Frank Smith	1.1658
98	Carl Hubbell*	1.1659
99	**Joe Musgrove**	1.1667
100	**Aaron Nola**	1.1671
