= Cubs–White Sox rivalry =

Major League Baseball cross-town rivalry in Chicago

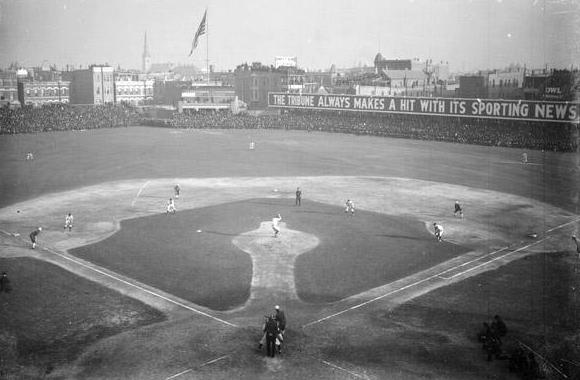
- Cubs pitcher Jack Pfiester throws a pitch in the 1906 World Series.

- Chicago Cubs Chicago White Sox
- Location: Chicago
- First meeting: World Series: October 9, 1906; West Side Park; White Sox 2, Cubs 1 Regular season: June 16, 1997; Comiskey Park (II); Cubs 8, White Sox 3
- Latest meeting: August 19, 2026; Wrigley Field; White Sox 3, Cubs 0
- Next meeting: July 16, 2027; Wrigley Field
- Stadiums: Cubs: Wrigley Field; White Sox: Rate Field

Statistics
- Total meetings: 164
- All-time series: Tie, 82–82 (.500)
- Regular season series: Cubs, 80–78 (.506)
- Postseason results: White Sox, 4–2 (.667)
- Largest victory: Cubs, 10–0 (September 25, 2020); 13–3 (May 16, 2025); White Sox, 13–1 (August 29, 2021)
- Longest win streak: Cubs, 8 (August 15, 2023–May 18, 2025); White Sox, 5 (June 27, 2009–June 12, 2010)
- Current win streak: White Sox, 1

Post-season history
- 1906 World Series: White Sox won, 4–2

Locations of the Chicago Cubs and Chicago White Sox

The Cubs–White Sox rivalry (also known as the Crosstown Classic, The Windy City Showdown, Chicago Showdown, North–South Showdown, City Series, Crosstown Series, Crosstown Cup, or Crosstown Showdown) refers to the Major League Baseball (MLB) geographical rivalry between the Chicago Cubs and Chicago White Sox. The Cubs are a member club of MLB's National League (NL) Central division, and play their home games at Wrigley Field, located on Chicago's North Side. The White Sox are a member club of MLB's American League (AL) Central division, and play their home games at Rate Field, located on Chicago's South Side.

The terms "North Siders" and "South Siders" are synonymous with the respective teams and their fans, setting up an enduring rivalry. Fans from the North Shore and Chicago's northern suburbs tend to support the Cubs, whereas fans from the south side of Chicago, Chicago Southland, and the south suburbs tend to support the White Sox.

As of May 17, 2026, the Cubs lead the regular season series 78–77. There have been nine 3-game series sweeps since interleague play began: five by the Cubs in 1998, 2004, 2007, 2008, and 2025, and four by the White Sox in 1999, 2008, 2012 and 2021. There have been three season series sweeps, all by the Cubs in 1998 (3 games), 2013 (4 games) and 2024 (4 games). The Chicago Transit Authority's Red Line train has stops within a block of both ballparks: Addison station for Wrigley Field and Sox–35th station for Rate Field.

== History ==
While teams in New York City (such as the Yankees, Giants, and Brooklyn Dodgers) routinely played against each other in World Series matchups throughout the 1940s and 1950s, the two Chicago teams only met once in the 1906 World Series, a celebrated event that seemingly put the city on hold for a full week. The heavily favored but young Cubs (who had won 116 games in the regular season) lost in six games to the veteran and pitching-strong White Sox, the "Hitless Wonders".

From 1903 until 1942, excluding the years one team or the other won the pennant, the Cubs and White Sox played each other in a best-of-seven postseason City Series. These series were officially sanctioned by the National Baseball Commission and, later, the Commissioner of Baseball. The first series was played in 1903 and was a best-of-15. That year, the Cubs had a 6–3 series lead before the White Sox came back to force a 7–7 tie. Thanks to a rainout, they did not play the decisive 15th game as the players' contracts expired on October 15. Starting in 1905, the series became best-of-seven and remained that way until 1942. In all, they played 25 City Series with the White Sox winning 18 and the Cubs winning six to go along with the tie of 1903. The 1912 version marked the first time in a Major League Baseball postseason series that a team overcame a 3–0 series deficit as the White Sox won the final four games of the series.

1985 saw the start of an annual "Windy City Classic" charity game. The series alternated between the respective teams' ballparks, with Comiskey Park hosting the first year followed by Wrigley Field the next. The Sox would go 10–0–2 in this affair that lasted through 1995 (two games were played in 1995). One exhibition between the teams at Wrigley Field on April 7, 1994, was notable for the White Sox having Michael Jordan playing right field – Jordan was playing for a White Sox minor-league affiliate, the Birmingham Barons, during the first of his nearly two seasons of his first retirement from the NBA before his comeback with the Bulls.

Since inter-league play began in 1997, the White Sox and Cubs have routinely played each other four or six times each year (one two or three-game series at each stadium). Based on the availability of tickets and the prices offered through ticket brokers, these games are among the most anticipated of the season.

In 2008, the teams played each other as leaders of their respective divisions for the first time ever: the White Sox in the American League Central and the Cubs in the National League Central. Also for the first time in the rivalry's history, both Sunday games to end each series were televised nationally on ESPN's Sunday Night Baseball. The Chicago Cubs swept the White Sox in the first weekend series at Wrigley Field, and the White Sox subsequently swept the Cubs at U.S. Cellular Field during the second weekend series, thus splitting the series 3–3 and resulting in an all-time inter-league series tie of 33–33 through 2008.

The Crosstown Cup trophy was introduced in 2010 and the White Sox won the trophy the first three seasons before the Cubs finally won it in 2013. The Cubs winning the 4 games of their 2013 series marks the inter-league series at 49–45 to the White Sox. In 2014 the White Sox reclaimed the Crosstown Cup after winning the first three games of their four-game series. They won the first two games at Wrigley Field 3–1 in 12 and 4–1 respectively, came back to U.S. Cellular Field to win 8–3 before getting blown out in the final game 12–5.

In 2010, 2011, and 2012, the trophy was sponsored by oil and gas company BP and was known as the BP Crosstown Cup. From 2013 to 2018 there was no corporate sponsor. In 2019 the trophy was sponsored by the financial holding company Wintrust and was therefore called the Wintrust Crosstown Cup. In 2020, the teams faced each other as leaders of their divisions for the first time since 2008 in the Pandemic shortened season with the White Sox taking the three game series at Wrigley and the Cubs taking the three game series on the Southside. Both teams also made the playoffs in the same season for the first time since 2008 but both were eliminated in the Wild Card Round. On August 8, 2021, MLB aired a game on ABC for the first time since 1995 with the game between the White Sox and Cubs at Wrigley Field with the White Sox winning the game 9–3. In a game on August 27, 2021, the White Sox and Cubs combined for 30 runs in a 17–13 White Sox victory at Guaranteed Rate Field, the most runs scored in a game between the two teams. It was also the most runs scored by the White Sox against the Cubs. It also included a combined six home runs, four from the Cubs, and two from the White Sox. It also saw White Sox catcher Yasmani Grandal hit two home runs and tying a White Sox franchise record with 8 RBI's in his first game since July 5 the same year after coming back from a knee injury.

=== Barrett vs. Pierzynski ===
The rivalry turned physical on May 20, 2006, when a brawl broke out during a White Sox-Cubs game at U.S. Cellular Field. In the bottom of the second inning, Brian Anderson of the White Sox hit a sacrifice fly, attempting to score catcher A. J. Pierzynski. Pierzynski collided with Cubs' catcher Michael Barrett. Barrett dropped the ball in the collision and Pierzynski was safe. After slapping home plate in celebration, Pierzynski began to walk away, but Barrett blocked his path and punched him in the jaw. Both benches cleared and a brawl broke out. Umpires debated for 15 minutes before ejecting Pierzynski, Barrett, White Sox outfielder Brian Anderson and Cubs first baseman John Mabry from the game. When play finally resumed, outfielder Scott Podsednik promptly got on base, loading the bases up, and second baseman Tadahito Iguchi cleared them with a grand-slam. The White Sox won the game, 7–0. Michael Barrett was suspended for 10 games, while Brian Anderson was suspended for five and A. J. Pierzynski was fined.

In 2006, Pierzynski was named one of the five American League players in the All-Star Final Vote. Soon afterwards the Chicago White Sox organization began an election campaign using the slogan "Punch A.J.", inspired by the May 20, 2006 collision and slugging incident between Pierzynski and Michael Barrett. Pierzynski received 3.6 million votes, the most votes in the American League, subsequently sending him to his second All-Star appearance.

== Stadiums ==
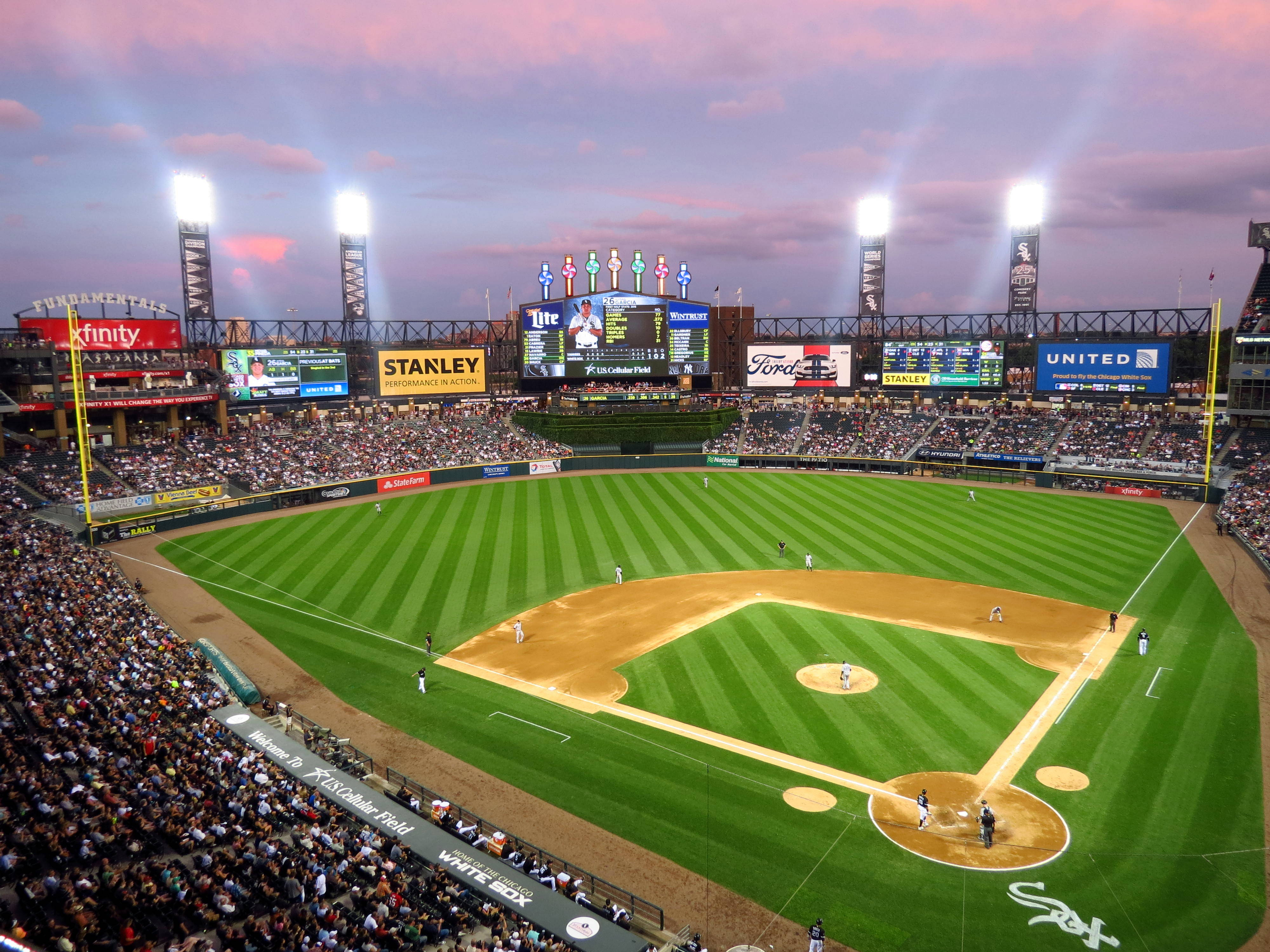
Rate Field, home of the Chicago White Sox

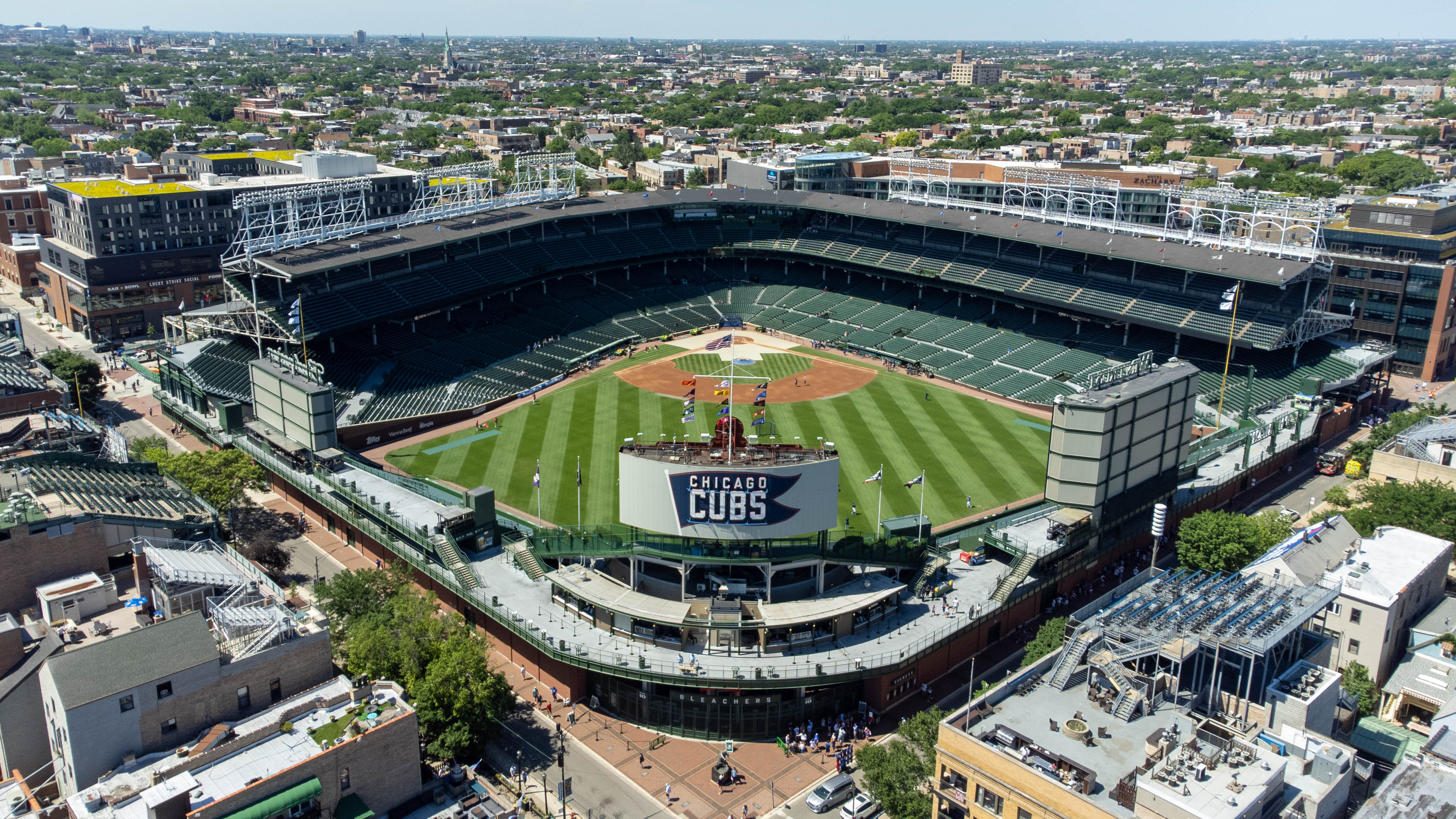
Wrigley Field, home of the Chicago Cubs

=== White Sox ===
The White Sox have always been located on the south side. At the time the White Sox came to town, the Cubs' home field was West Side Park, in an older section of the city which is now the West Campus of the University of Illinois at Chicago and near the United Center, home of the Chicago Bulls and Chicago Blackhawks. (Coincidentally, for a few seasons in the early 1890s the Cubs home park was within a block of the sites of the future Sox ballparks). In 1916 the Cubs moved from the west to the north side, taking over Weeghman Park, the abandoned Federal League facility (later renamed Wrigley Field), thus setting up the current separation.

When the new Comiskey Park (now called Rate Field) was built, many in the media and baseball (including both Cubs and White Sox fans) called the park "sterile", and lacking the beauty and personality of the old park, even though many seats at the old park were cramped, behind posts, or in the outfield. Others contend that in contrast Wrigley Field is dirty, uncomfortable, and generally unpleasant to be in. Regardless, this again set up a point of rivalry as Cubs fans had their classic park, while White Sox fans had their modern park. Former Sox manager Ozzie Guillén said of Wrigley, "But one thing about Wrigley Field, I puke every time I go there", further polarizing this point of contention. While several renovations to Rate Field have silenced many criticisms, such as the improved upper deck and bleachers, the difference between the fields remains a point of rivalry between fans of the teams.

=== Cubs ===
When the Tribune Company bought the Cubs, they immediately started pressing for night baseball, threatening to abandon Wrigley Field otherwise. Night baseball was finally added in 1988, and after some further negotiations with the city, in the winter of 2005–2006 they expanded Wrigley's bleachers for the first time since 1938.

Even the neighborhoods around the stadiums show the difference between the fans. Wrigleyville, a part of the Lake View neighborhood, surrounds the Cubs' stadium, and comprises middle- and upper-middle-class housing, as well as many restaurants, bars and music venues for fans to visit before and after games. In contrast, the Bridgeport neighborhood directly west of the White Sox home field has a more "blue-collar" reputation. There are bars and restaurants in Bridgeport, too, but White Sox fans must walk or drive a few blocks from Rate Field to get to them. Until April 2011, the White Sox opened a brand-new bar and restaurant located at Gate 5 of Rate Field, known as ChiSox Bar & Grill. The new bar and restaurant do not require a game ticket to enter.

== Television coverage ==
Until 2004, WGN-TV and the now-defunct FSN Chicago would "switch off" during interleague games: for the Cubs home games, the Cubs commentary team would call the game, while the Sox commentary team would have the call for their home games. Starting in 2005, both WGN and then newly created NBC Sports Chicago show the games on each network with both commentary crews at the same time, allowing the viewer to watch the game without an opposing team bias. The stations generally switched off each day. For example, in a series at Wrigley Field, WGN would treat the game on Friday as a Cubs home game with NBCSC treating it as a White Sox away game; on Sunday WGN would broadcast a White Sox away game and NBCSC showed a Cubs home game; with the other game alternating between the two channels). The shared game status ended following the 2019 season of both teams, the last time WGN broadcast the FTA matchups of both teams, with NBCSC becoming the full time home of the White Sox while the Cubs move on to a team-owned cable channel, Marquee Sports Network. Starting in 2025, the White Sox games would air on the new Chicago Sports Network.

== Performance ==
While New York of the 1940s and 1950s often had two or three teams vying for championships, the two Chicago teams had comparatively little to celebrate for much of the time after World War II, except for pennants in 1945 (Cubs) and 1959 (Sox), until the White Sox won the 2005 World Series and the Cubs won the 2016 World Series. Historically, each team's fans felt bad for their own team's relatively poor performance, but took solace in that the other team was doing just as badly. Thus, the rivalry often was one in which fans of one team are just as happy for the poor play of the other team as they are for the good play of their own (schadenfreude). This above all is what made the Chicago rivalry unique in Major League Baseball. An examination of other great rivalries (Red Sox–Yankees, Mets–Yankees, A's–Giants, Dodgers–Giants) shows that both teams have made World Series appearances on a fairly regular basis.

The animosity among fans (that only rarely escalates to violence) is summed up in the lines from the song "The Ballad of the South Side Irish", echoing sentiments often expressed by at least one side of any number of sports rivalries in America: "When it comes to baseball I've got two favorite clubs, the 'go-go White Sox'... and whoever plays the Cubs." Ardent fans such as the late columnist Mike Royko, a Cubs fan, and late writer Nelson Algren, a Sox fan, would take their shots at the other team. Royko once wrote that the reason Sox fans have a "bad attitude" is that when they would go to games at Comiskey Park, the stench of the Union Stock Yards would fill their nostrils and remind them of the status of their team. The stockyards closed in 1971.

Several Cubs and White Sox fans have made a cottage industry selling shirts, hats, and other souvenirs that include slogans intended to take swipes at the opposing teams, rather than support their own. Time reported that 36% of Cubs fans were rooting against the White Sox during the 2005 World Series. White Sox Fans wave the Blue Cubs Loss flag after their team defeats the Cubs in mockery of the Cubs Win Flag tradition, in reverse the white Win Flag is waved by the Cubs fans in every win against the White Sox and "Go, Cubs, Go" is played during home victories as well.

Team owners naturally encourage such rivalries (two-time Sox owner Bill Veeck was a master at it) in the hope that they will translate to increased gate receipts, and the Cubs-Sox inter-league games have borne out that theory.

President Barack Obama, an avid White Sox fan, has taken verbal jabs at the Cubs on several occasions. When the New York Yankees (managed by former Cub Joe Girardi) visited the White House in honor of their 2009 World Series championship, Obama said, "It's been nine years since your last title—which must have felt like eternity for Yankee fans. I think other teams would be just fine with a spell like that. The Cubs, for example." Obama however, has stated that while he is aware that many people hate the other team, he does not hate the Cubs and wants them to win as long as they are not playing the White Sox. On the other hand, his wife, First Lady Michelle Obama, has been a lifelong Cubs fan and following the Cubs' 2016 World Series victory, Barack went as far as to invite them to the White House, tweeting that the Cubs' historic win was "change that even [he] can believe in". The Cubs came to the White House four days before the end of Obama's presidency.

In 2025, Awa III, the Catholicos-Patriarch of the Assyrian Church of the East and native Chicagoan, presented a customized Cubs jersey to Pope Leo XIV, also a native Chicagoan but an avid White Sox fan.

During the 2026 season, A.J. Pierzynski visited the Pope and gifted the pontiff the final-out baseball from Game 1 of the 2005 World Series, a game the pope famously attended as a fan growing up in Chicago. During the visit, he mentioned that he also attended Game 2, another victory for the White Sox en route to winning the 2005 World Series.

== "Cursed" teams ==
While not meant in the most literal sense to most fans, there is an overall feeling that both teams' misfortunes began with unfortunate events which some claim have cursed both teams into their poor play. This adds to the overall downtrodden feelings that fans feel for their own teams, making it much easier to revel in the poor play of the other. The two teams have the longest droughts in the MLB. The Cubs had a 108-year drought that went from 1908 to 2016, and the White Sox had an 88-year drought that went from 1917 to 2005.

The Chicago Cubs won ten National League championships between 1901 and 1945, and also had among the best winning percentages in the NL up to that time (3,796–3,022 for a 0.557 winning percentage). The Cubs had a 2 games to 1 lead over the Detroit Tigers in the 1945 World Series, when on October 6, 1945, Cubs fan and local tavern owner Billy Sianis was prevented from reaching his seat because he was accompanied by his pet billy goat. Local legend says that he responded by placing a curse on the Cubs to never again win the World Series, which they were not able to do until 2016. The Cubs, on more than one occasion, have featured a tongue-in-cheek promotion where billy goats are brought into the stadium to be offered as an apology.

Some historians argue that the genesis of the curse goes back much farther; that the allegedly underhanded way they won the 1908 pennant (leading to their last World Series win) angered the "baseball gods". For lack of a standard term, this could be called the curse of Fred Merkle, since he was at the center of the controversy. Every post-season they have participated in since then seems to have featured a disaster of some kind, from Hack Wilson losing a fly ball in the sun, to Babe Ruth's called shot, to the "Steve Bartman incident". When they won the division in 1984, their first postseason appearance since 1945, manager Jim Frey shouted in the champagne-soaked clubhouse, "The monkey's off our back!" Some fans took that as the kiss of death... which it proved to be, as the Padres late-inning rally in the final game in San Diego featured a ground ball slipping under the glove of first baseman Leon Durham... an eerie precursor to a similar and much-more-memorialized incident with the Red Sox and former Cubs first baseman Bill Buckner that would occur two years later. That requires a quick mention of the "Ex-Cubs Factor", an offshoot of the main Cubs "curse": that any team reaching the post-season since the 1945 Series, and having three or more ex-Cubs, was almost certainly doomed to lose in either the playoffs or the Series due to "a critical mass of Cubness". The 1960 Pirates had been the lone exception until 2001, when the Diamondbacks effectively ended talk of that curse by winning the Series in a dramatic finish that featured two of the three ex-Cubs, one of them (Luis Gonzalez) providing the series-winning RBI.

The White Sox had the best winning percentage of any American League team from 1901 to 1920 (1,638–1,325 for a 0.553 winning percentage), but quickly slipped to among the worst teams after that. Many point to the Black Sox scandal surrounding the 1919 World Series as the point in history that changed the White Sox fortunes. Eight White Sox players conspired to intentionally lose the World Series, and in 1920 were banned from baseball for life. While the White Sox won 4 AL titles in the first 20 years of their existence, they would win only one more league championship in the twentieth century. The term "curse" has seldom been used as such, since the scandal was perceived to be something the players did to themselves rather than being wrought by the front office conducting ill-advised transactions or committing public relations gaffes. In fact, many White Sox fans take offense to the term "curse". Still, a pall seemed to settle on the franchise (along with a slim budget). It would be the end of FDR's first term before they were a factor in a pennant race again, and it would be the last years of the Eisenhower administration before they would win another pennant. When the White Sox clinched the pennant in 1959, broadcaster Jack Brickhouse capped his play-by-play with, "A forty year wait has now ended!" The 2005 pennant ended a forty-six-year wait for the next one, while the 2005 World Championship ended an 88-year wait for a World Series victory. This adds a decidedly interesting twist on the rivalry as there were, until 2005, very few fans for either team who were alive to see one side actually claim a title while the other waited.

== Club success ==
Team	World Series Titles	League pennants	Division titles	Wild Card Berths	Playoff Appearances	World Series Appearances	All-time Regular Season record	Win percentage	Seasons played
Chicago Cubs	3	17	8	4	22	11	11,419–10,837–161	.513	153
Chicago White Sox	3	6	6	1	11	5	9,654–9,714–103	.498	125
Combined	6	23	14	5	33	16	21,073–20,551–264	.506	153 in CHI 278 total

Note: Pennants won by both teams include pennants won before the modern World Series.
As of 2025 season.

=== Results ===
	Cubs wins	White Sox wins	Cubs runs	White Sox runs
Regular season	80	78	751	726
World Series	3	3	18	22
Total	82	82	769	748

Updated to most recent meeting, August 19, 2026.

== Season-by-season results ==
Note: In the history of the Crosstown cup, if the series is tied, the cup is awarded to the previous season winner.

Chicago Cubs vs. Chicago White Sox Season-by-Season Results
1900s (White Sox, 4–2)

Season	Season series		at Chicago Cubs	at Chicago White Sox	Overall series	Notes
1906 World Series	White Sox	4‍–‍2	White Sox, 3‍–‍0	Cubs, 2‍–‍1	White Sox; 4‍–‍2	Only World Series meeting between the two franchises.

1990s (Tie, 6–6)

Season	Season series		at Chicago Cubs	at Chicago White Sox	Overall series	Notes
1997	White Sox	2‍–‍1	no games	White Sox, 2‍–‍1	White Sox; 6‍–‍3	Interleague play was introduced in the 1997, the first time the Cubs and White Sox played each other in the regular season.
1998	Cubs	3‍–‍0	Cubs, 3‍–‍0	no games	Tie; 6‍–‍6	Cubs sweep the season series for the first time. Cubs sweep also extended their winning streak to 9 games.
1999	White Sox	4‍–‍2	White Sox, 3‍–‍0	Cubs, 2‍–‍1	White Sox; 10‍–‍8	First year of 6-game home-and-home series.

2000s (White Sox, 31–29)

Season	Season series		at Chicago Cubs	at Chicago White Sox	Overall series	Notes
2000	Tie	3‍–‍3	Cubs, 2‍–‍1	White Sox, 2‍–‍1	White Sox; 13‍–‍11	On June 9, White Sox beat the Cubs 6–5 in 14 innings, the longest game recorded in the rivalry.
2001	White Sox	4‍–‍2	White Sox, 2‍–‍1	White Sox, 2‍–‍1	White Sox; 17‍–‍13	
2002	Tie	3‍–‍3	Cubs, 2‍–‍1	White Sox, 2‍–‍1	White Sox; 20‍–‍16	
2003	White Sox	4‍–‍2	White Sox, 2‍–‍1	White Sox, 2‍–‍1	White Sox; 24‍–‍18	
2004	Cubs	4‍–‍2	Cubs, 3‍–‍0	White Sox, 2‍–‍1	White Sox; 26‍–‍22	Cubs sweep White Sox at Wrigley Field.
2005	Tie	3‍–‍3	White Sox, 2‍–‍1	Cubs, 2‍–‍1	White Sox; 29‍–‍25	White Sox win 2005 World Series, their first in 88 years and ending the Curse of the Black Sox.
2006	White Sox	4‍–‍2	White Sox, 2‍–‍1	White Sox, 2‍–‍1	White Sox; 33‍–‍27	A. J. Pierzynski, Michael Barrett incident. On July 2, Cubs beat the White Sox 15–11, their most runs in a game against the White Sox.
2007	Cubs	5‍–‍1	Cubs, 2‍–‍1	Cubs, 3‍–‍0	White Sox; 34‍–‍32	Cubs sweep White Sox at U.S. Cellular Field.
2008	Tie	3‍–‍3	Cubs, 3‍–‍0	White Sox, 3‍–‍0	White Sox; 37‍–‍35	First time the two teams played as leaders of their respective divisions Both teams won their division Both teams qualified for playoffs in the same season for the first time since 1906; First time the home team wins all games of the season series.
2009	White Sox	4‍–‍2	White Sox, 2‍–‍1	White Sox, 2‍–‍1	White Sox; 41‍–‍37	Cubs' home game on June 16 was postponed and rescheduled to September 3 due to rain.

2010s (Tie, 25–25)

Season	Season series		at Chicago Cubs	at Chicago White Sox	Overall series	Notes
2010	White Sox	4‍–‍2	White Sox, 2‍–‍1	White Sox, 2‍–‍1	White Sox; 45‍–‍39	First Crosstown Cup series. Carlos Zambrano tirade After their loss to the Cubs on June 13 at Wrigley Field, White Sox go on a 11–game winning streak, which was snapped with the Cubs' victory on June 27 at U.S. Cellular Field.
2011	White Sox	4‍–‍2	White Sox, 2‍–‍1	White Sox, 2‍–‍1	White Sox; 49‍–‍41	
2012	White Sox	4‍–‍2	White Sox, 3‍–‍0	Cubs, 2‍–‍1	White Sox; 53‍–‍43	White Sox sweep the Cubs at Wrigley Field
2013	Cubs	4‍–‍0	Cubs, 2‍–‍0	Cubs, 2‍–‍0	White Sox; 53‍–‍47	Series changed to four-game format with two in each ballpark except in years the AL Central plays the NL Central (2015, 2018, 2020, 2021). Game on May 28 at U.S. Cellular Field was rescheduled to July 8 due to rain. Cubs sweep the season series for the second time.
2014	White Sox	3‍–‍1	White Sox, 2‍–‍0	Tie, 1‍–‍1	White Sox; 56‍–‍48	White Sox sweep the Cubs at Wrigley Field.
2015	Tie	3‍–‍3	White Sox, 2‍–‍1	Cubs, 2‍–‍1	White Sox; 59‍–‍51	White Sox retain the Crosstown Cup.
2016	Tie	2‍–‍2	Cubs, 2‍–‍0	White Sox, 2‍–‍0	White Sox; 61‍–‍53	White Sox retain the Crosstown Cup; Cubs win the 2016 World Series, their first in 108 years, and ending the Curse of the Billy Goat.
2017	Cubs	3‍–‍1	Tie, 1‍–‍1	Cubs, 2‍–‍0	White Sox; 62‍–‍56	Cubs sweep at Guaranteed Rate Field.
2018	Cubs	4‍–‍2	Cubs, 2‍–‍1	Cubs, 2‍–‍1	White Sox; 64‍–‍60	
2019	Tie	2‍–‍2	Tie, 1‍–‍1	Tie, 1‍–‍1	White Sox; 66‍–‍62	Cubs retain the Crosstown Cup. First time the season series is split at both locations.

2020s (Cubs, 20–16)

Season	Season series		at Chicago Cubs	at Chicago White Sox	Overall series	Notes
2020	Tie	3‍–‍3	White Sox, 2‍–‍1	Cubs, 2‍–‍1	White Sox; 69‍–‍65	Cubs retain the Crosstown Cup. On September 25, Cubs beat the White Sox 10-0, their largest margin of victory in a game against the White Sox. Both teams qualified for playoffs for the first time since the 2008 season. Series at Guaranteed Rate Field marked the conclusion of the season.
2021	White Sox	5‍–‍1	White Sox, 3‍–‍0	White Sox, 2‍–‍1	White Sox; 74‍–‍66	On August 27, the White Sox beat the Cubs 17–13, their most runs scored in a game against the Cubs and also the most runs scored combined in a game between the two teams with 30 runs. On August 29, the White Sox beat the Cubs 13–1, their largest margin of victory in a game against the Cubs. White Sox sweep at Wrigley Field.
2022	White Sox	3‍–‍1	White Sox, 2‍–‍0	Tie, 1‍–‍1	White Sox; 77‍–‍67	White Sox sweep at Wrigley Field.
2023	Cubs	3‍–‍1	Tie, 1‍–‍1	Cubs, 2‍–‍0	White Sox; 78‍–‍70	All MLB teams start playing each other in a season; a four-game series format is used for interleague rivals. Cubs sweep at Guaranteed Rate Field.
2024	Cubs	4‍–‍0	Cubs, 2‍–‍0	Cubs, 2‍–‍0	White Sox; 78‍–‍74	Cubs sweep the season series for the third time. White Sox lose 121 games, the most in modern MLB history.
2025	Cubs	5‍–‍1	Cubs, 3‍–‍0	Cubs, 2‍–‍1	Tie; 79‍–‍79	Return of six-game format with each team hosting a three-game weekend series.
2026	Tie	3‍–‍3	Cubs, 2‍–‍1	White Sox, 2‍–‍1	Tie; 82‍–‍82	Cubs retain the Crosstown Cup.

Summary of Results

Season	Season series		at Chicago Cubs	at Chicago White Sox	Notes
Regular season games	Chicago Cubs	80‍–‍78	Cubs, 40‍–‍39	Cubs, 40‍–‍39	
Postseason games	White Sox	4‍–‍2	White Sox, 3‍–‍0	Cubs, 2‍–‍1	
Postseason series	White Sox	1‍–‍0	White Sox, 1‍–‍0	Cubs, 1‍–‍0	World Series: 1906
Regular and postseason	Tie	82‍–‍82	White Sox, 42‍–‍40	Cubs, 42‍–‍40	

== Notable players who played for both teams ==
Name	Position(s)	Cubs tenure	White Sox tenure
Alex Avila	C	2017	2016
George Bell	LF	1991	1992–1993
Bobby Bonds	RF	1981	1978
Phil Cavarretta	1B/OF	1934–1953	1954–1955
Steve Cishek	P	2018–2019	2020
Neal Cotts	P	2007–2009	2003–2006
Goose Gossage	P	1988	1972–1976
Clark Griffith	P & OF	1893–1900	1901–1902
Billy Hamilton	CF	2020	2021, 2023
Johnny Evers	2B	1902–1913	1922
Chris Flexen	P	2025	2024
Austin Jackson	CF	2015	2016
Darrin Jackson	OF	1985, 1987–1989	1994, 1999
Edwin Jackson	P	2013–2015	2010–2011
Jon Jay	OF	2017	2019
Lance Johnson	CF	1997–1999	1988–1995
Don Kessinger	SS	1964–1975	1977–1979
Craig Kimbrel	P	2019–2021	2021
Don Larsen	P	1967	1961
Kenny Lofton	CF	2003	2002
Nick Madrigal	2B	2022–2024	2020–2021
Martín Maldonado	C	2019	2024
Dave Martinez	OF	1986–1988, 2000	1995–1997
Juan Pierre	OF	2006	2010–2011
Juan Pizarro	P	1970–1973	1961–1966
José Quintana	P	2017–2020	2012–2017
David Robertson	P	2022	2015–2017
Jeff Samardzija	P	2008–2014	2015
Ron Santo	3B	1960–1973	1974
Sammy Sosa	RF	1992–2004	1989–1991
Geovany Soto	C	2005–2012	2015, 2017
Steve Stone	P	1974–1976	1973, 1977–1978
Mike Tauchman	OF	2023–2024	2025
Ryan Tepera	P	2020–2021	2021
Luis Vizcaíno	P	2009	2005

== See also ==
- Major League Baseball rivalries
- Bay Bridge Series, Oakland Athletics vs. San Francisco Giants
- Freeway Series, Los Angeles Angels vs. Los Angeles Dodgers
- Subway Series/Mets–Yankees, New York Mets vs. New York Yankees, etc.
- Beltway Series, Baltimore Orioles vs. Washington Nationals
- Citrus Series, Miami Marlins vs. Tampa Bay Rays
- Show-Me Series, St. Louis Cardinals vs. Kansas City Royals
- Ohio Cup, Cincinnati Reds vs. Cleveland Indians
- Lone Star Series, Houston Astros vs. Texas Rangers

=== Former Chicago-based rivalry ===
- Bears–Cardinals rivalry
