= Al Schacht =

American baseball player (1892-1984)

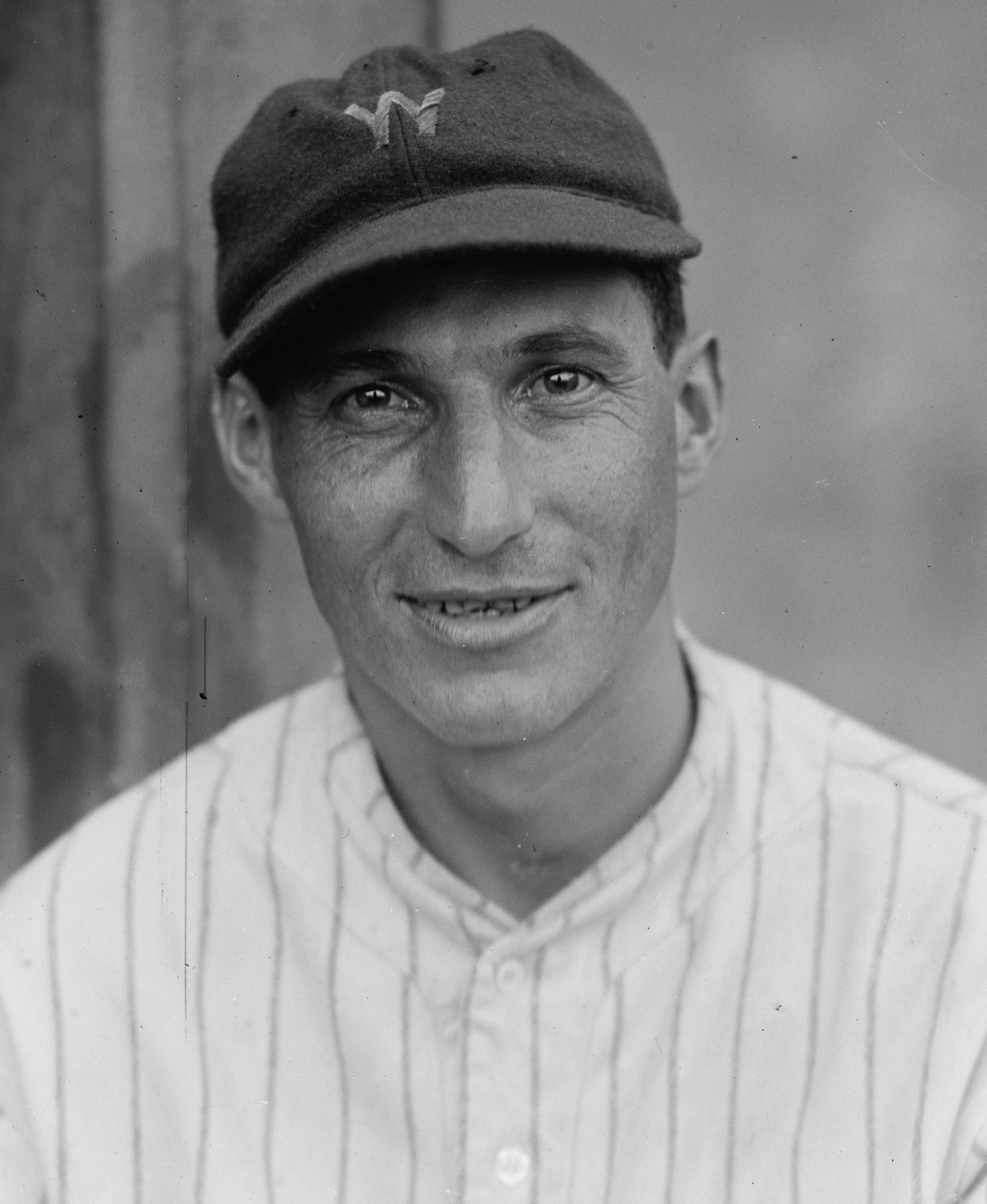
- Schacht in 1925
- Pitcher
- Born: November 11, 1892; New York City, New York, U.S.
- Died: July 14, 1984 (aged 91); Waterbury, Connecticut, U.S.
- Batted: Right Threw: Right

MLB debut
- September 18, 1919, for the Washington Senators

Last MLB appearance
- September 6, 1921, for the Washington Senators

MLB statistics
- Win–loss record: 14–10
- Earned run average: 4.48
- Strikeouts: 38
- Stats at Baseball Reference

Teams
- Washington Senators (1919–1921)

Alexander Schacht (November 11, 1892 – July 14, 1984) was an American professional baseball player, coach, clown, and, later, restaurateur. Schacht was a pitcher for the Washington Senators in the American League from 1919 to 1921.

== Early life ==
Schacht was born in New York City, where he attended the High School of Commerce.

== Pitcher, coach, and "clown" ==
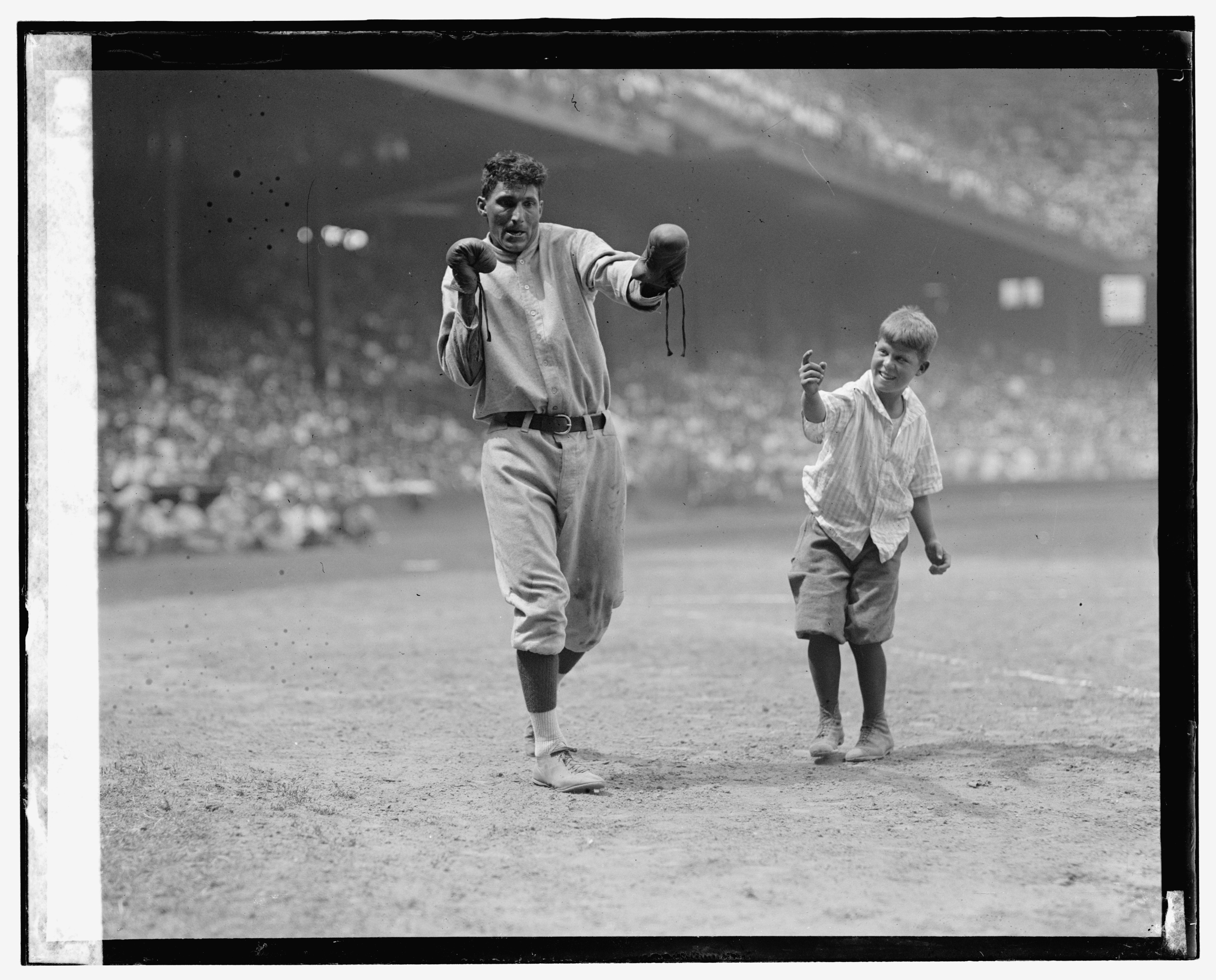
Schacht in 1925

Although he compiled a 14–10 won/loss mark (with a 4.48 earned run average) in his three-year MLB pitching career and was highly regarded as a third-base coach, Schacht's ability to mimic other players from the coaching lines, and his comedy routines with fellow Washington coach Nick Altrock, earned him the nickname "The Clown Prince of Baseball" (a sobriquet later given to fellow ballplayer-turned-entertainer Max Patkin). Ironically, at the height of their collaboration, Schacht and Altrock developed a deep personal animosity and stopped speaking to each other off the field. During their famous comic re-enactments of the Dempsey–Tunney championship boxing match, many speculated that they pulled no punches as they rained blows on each other.

After 11 seasons (1924–34) as a Senator coach, Schacht broke up his act with Altrock to follow Washington manager Joe Cronin to the Boston Red Sox, where Schacht coached at third base in 1935–36. He then focused on a solo career as a baseball clown and entertainer.

== Restaurant ==
Following World War II, Schacht went into the restaurant business. His eponymous steakhouse at 102 E. 52nd Street (at Park Avenue) in Manhattan was popular for decades, catering to a clientele of sports stars and stage and screen celebrities. The menus at Al Schacht's were round, fashioned as oversized baseballs, and featured dishes named after old-time players. From time to time, Schacht would mount the small restaurant stage and launch into his old routines, to the delight of patrons. The restaurant's exterior appears in the 1961 movie Breakfast at Tiffany's.

== Personal life ==
Schacht was Jewish, famously writing in his autobiography: "There is talk that I am Jewish—just because my father was Jewish, my mother is Jewish, I speak Yiddish, and once studied to be a rabbi and a cantor. Well, that's how rumors get started."

After WWII, Al met and married Mabelle Radcliffe, a vocalist who went by the stage name Mabelle Russell. They eventually moved to Southbury, CT and lived there until his death in 1984. Mabelle died in 1995.

Preceded by N/A	Boston Red Sox third-base coach 1935–1936	Succeeded by Tom Daly
