= Bears–Cardinals rivalry =

National Football League rivalry

Chicago Bears–Arizona Cardinals rivalry
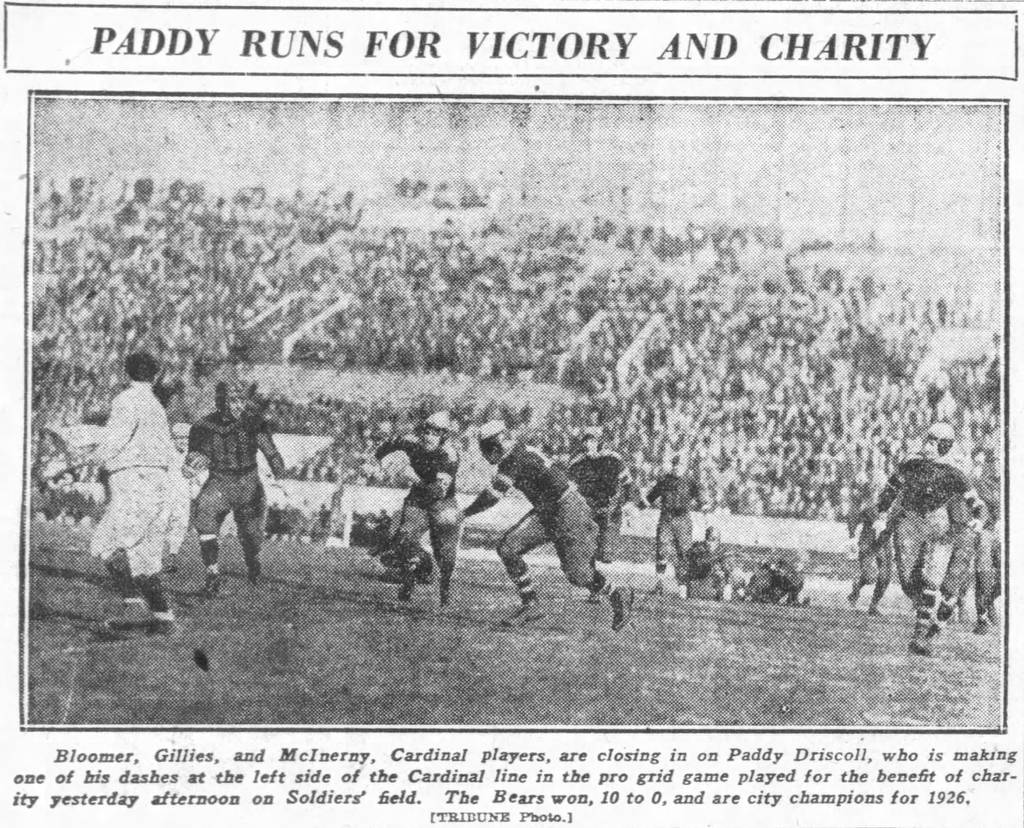
- Bears and Cardinals face off during the 1926 season.

- Chicago Bears Arizona Cardinals
- Location: Chicago, Phoenix
- First meeting: November 28, 1920; Cardinals 7, Staleys 6
- Latest meeting: November 3, 2024; Cardinals 29, Bears 9
- Next meeting: 2027
- Stadiums: Bears: Soldier Field; Cardinals: State Farm Stadium

Statistics
- Total meetings: 96
- All-time series: Bears: 60–30–6
- Largest victory: Bears: 53–7 (1941); Cardinals: 53–14 (1955)
- Most points scored: Bears: 53 (1941); Cardinals: 53 (1955)
- Longest win streak: Bears: 7 (1940–1943); Cardinals: 4 (1950–1952)
- Current win streak: Cardinals: 1 (2024–present)

The Bears–Cardinals rivalry is a National Football League (NFL) rivalry between the Chicago Bears and the Arizona Cardinals.

It is the oldest rivalry in the NFL, featuring the only two franchises that remain from the league's founding in 1920. At the time, the teams were known as the Decatur Staleys (now the Chicago Bears) and the Racine Cardinals (now the Arizona Cardinals). Despite the "Racine" name, the Cardinals were based in Chicago, named after the city's Racine Avenue. In 1921, the Staleys relocated to Chicago, and the rivalry became known as the "Battle of Chicago," a moniker it held for 38 years. This longstanding competition is considered the first true rivalry in NFL history, and is often referred to by modern media as the "NFL's oldest rivalry."

The rivalry began to diminish after the 1959 NFL season, when the Cardinals relocated from Chicago to St. Louis. Following the move, the NFL began treating the Bears and Cardinals as a standard inter-divisional matchup for scheduling purposes, leading to significantly fewer meetings between the teams. During the AFL–NFL merger in 1970, the league considered several realignment proposals for the newly formed National Football Conference (NFC), one of which would have placed the Bears and Cardinals in the same division. However, this option was ultimately rejected in favor of an alignment that placed the Bears in the NFC Central and the Cardinals in the NFC East. The rivalry further declined when the Cardinals relocated again, this time to Arizona in 1988.

The Bears lead the overall series, 60–30–6. The two teams have not met in the playoffs.

== History ==
=== The first meeting ===
The Decatur Staleys and Racine Cardinals met for the first time on November 28, 1920 at Normal Park. Around 5,000 fans showed up to watch the Cardinals defeat the Staleys, 7–6. The loss was the only blemish in the Staleys record that season (ties were disregarded), and cost them the first American Professional Football Association title.

=== Grange's debut and 0–0 games ===
Shortly after finishing his college career at the University of Illinois, Red Grange made his NFL debut with the Bears on Thanksgiving against the Cardinals in 1925. Around 36,000 fans showed up at Cubs Park to see the Bears tie the Cardinals 0–0. In fact, this was one of 17 consecutive games after their first meeting which ended in a shutout for either or both teams, with four 0–0 scores. The Cardinals would win their first (and highly disputed) of two NFL championships that season.

=== The Ernie Nevers Game ===
The Cardinals' Ernie Nevers scored a still-standing NFL record of 40 points in a single game, doing so with six touchdowns and four extra points. Nevers scored all of the points in the Cardinals' 40–6 victory over the Bears on November 28, 1929. It was also the first game between the two teams since their inaugural game that did not end in a shutout.

=== Pat Coffee's 97-yard touchdown ===
The Cardinals' 42–28 loss to the Bears at Wrigley Field in 1937 was mostly remembered for Pat Coffee's then-record 97-yard touchdown pass to Gaynell Tinsley, one of ten combined touchdown passes in the game.

=== Spygate Incident ===
In 1934, both the Bears and the Cardinals practiced at Wrigley Field, but each team halted when they spotted spies and interlopers. Another incident occurred on October 7, 1942, when Cardinals head coach Jimmy Conzelman noticed two men in topcoats observing their practice. Conzelman later claimed the car belonged to a friend of one of the Bears. Bears owner George Halas dismissed the accusations as "ridiculous."

=== 1950s: Realignment and the last decade of the local rivalry ===
The Cardinals won their second (and most recent) NFL championship in 1947. After the 1949 NFL season, owners agreed to absorb the remnants of the All-America Football Conference. As part of this process, the enlarged league adopted a division alignment ostensibly to be based less on geography, in part with a view of ensuring all NFL franchises would have equal exposure in the two-team cities of New York and Chicago. The divisions were re-branded "American" (East) and "National" (West) with the Cardinals making the move to the American Division.

Despite being in separate divisions, the Chicago teams nevertheless continued to play each other twice per year until 1953, when the divisions reverted to their traditional "Eastern" and "Western" names and the "Battle of Chicago" was reduced to a once-per-year affair.

By this time, the Cardinals were struggling on the field and at the gate. Nevertheless, in the 13 meetings between the Bears and Cardinals during the decade, the Bears only won seven of them. The Cardinals' last victory as a Chicago team over the Bears was a memorable one, as they won 53–14 at Comiskey Park in 1955 behind Ollie Matson's two touchdowns, including a 77-yard punt return. The Bears finished with a 47–19–6 all-time record against the Chicago Cardinals.

Even after moving to St. Louis and then much further west to Arizona, the Cardinals remained an "Eastern" team. It was not until the major realignment of prior to the 2002 NFL season (the Cardinals' fifteenth season in Arizona) that they finally became members of the NFC West.

=== 1960–1987: Chicago vs. St. Louis ===
In the 1960 season, the Cardinals moved to St. Louis, with the Bears helping facilitate the move by paying $500,000 as "moving expenses", as they were now the sole owners of the expanding TV rights in Chicago (they would later start using the "Wishbone-C" in their logo, which the Cardinals used since the 1920s, and was first used in 1898 by the University of Chicago football team). The Cardinals successfully kept its the team name despite the existence of the baseball Cardinals in the city. Coincidentally, both Cardinals franchises shared the same building during the football Cardinals' 28 seasons in St. Louis: Busch Stadium I from 1960 to 1965, and Busch Memorial Stadium from 1966 to 1987. Despite the relocation, some Chicago Cardinals fans could not bring themselves to cheer for the Bears.

The Bears faced the Cardinals for the first time as a St. Louis-based team in a preseason game in the 1963 season. They later met in a regular season game during the 1965 season. The two teams met only eleven times during the Cardinals' tenure in St. Louis, with the Cardinals amassing a 6–5 record. The Bears never played at Busch Stadium I. In the teams' first-ever meeting in St. Louis during the 1966 season, Cardinal defensive back Larry Wilson intercepted three passes, including a game-winning pick-six in St. Louis' 24–17 victory. Despite the Cardinals' success in St. Louis against the Bears, they only made four playoff appearances, and would once again be on the move after the 1987 season. The last-ever meeting between the Bears and St. Louis Cardinals came in the 1984 season, a game which saw Neil Lomax gash Buddy Ryan's 46 defense for six completions and 166 yards to Roy Green, and Ottis Anderson score two touchdowns in the Cardinals' 38–21 victory.

=== 1988–present: Chicago vs. Phoenix/Arizona ===
The Cardinals moved further west to the Phoenix metropolitan area in 1988, becoming the Phoenix Cardinals. In their first matchup as a Phoenix-based franchise, the Cardinals hosted the Bears in Phoenix, but the near-sellout crowd was expected to be composed mostly of Bears fans. They then changed their name to the Arizona Cardinals in the 1994 season. As of 2021, the Bears won seven of 11 meetings with the Arizona Cardinals, but to this day, the teams have yet to face each other in the NFL playoffs.

=== The Dennis Green Game ===
The most memorable game of the rivalry took place on Monday Night Football during the 2006 season. The then-undefeated Bears (5–0 heading into the game) trailed the 1–4 Cardinals by 20 points at halftime. The Cardinals also held Bears quarterback Rex Grossman at just 14 completions in 37 passing attempts for 144 yards passing while getting six turnovers from the Bears quarterback as Grossman threw four interceptions and fumbled the ball twice and had a quarterback rating of 10.2 at the end of the game. However, the Cardinals still didn't win the game. At the end of the third quarter, Bears edge rusher Mark Anderson fumbled the ball out of Matt Leinart's hand and was recovered by Mike Brown for a touchdown and the Bears trailed 23–10 heading into the fourth quarter. However, Bears cornerback Charles Tillman returned a fumble by Edgerrin James that was forced out by Brian Urlacher 40 yards for a touchdown, and returner Devin Hester gave the Bears the lead with an 83-yard punt return touchdown. However, the Cardinals still had a chance to win.

Cardinals quarterback Matt Leinart attempted a comeback drive where he drove the Cardinals from their own 38 to the Bears 23 yard line. They had a shot to win but kicker Neil Rackers missed a 40-yard field goal with 52 seconds left to secure the Bears comeback victory. The final score was 24–23 Bears. After the loss, Cardinals head coach Dennis Green made a memorable post-game rant with the media, screaming "The Bears are what we thought they were. They're what we thought they were. We played them in preseason—who the hell takes a third game of the preseason like it's bullshit? Bullshit! We played them in the third game—everybody played three quarters—the Bears are who we thought they were! That's why we took the damn field. Now if you want to crown them, then crown their ass! But they (the Bears) are who we thought they were, and we let them off the hook!" The game made NFL Top 10 Meltdowns where it landed at No. 7 on the list and also made Top 10 Greatest Comebacks landing at No. 6.

== Season-by-season results ==
Decatur Staleys/Chicago Staleys/Chicago Bears vs. Racine/Chicago/St. Louis/Phoenix/Arizona Cardinals Season-by-Season Results
1920s (Bears, 9–6–4)

| Season | Results | Location | Overall series | Notes |
|---|---|---|---|---|
| 1920 | Cardinals; 7–6 | Normal Field | Cardinals; 1–0 | The APFA's first season. First meeting at Normal Field. Cardinals' win is the Staleys' only loss in the 1920 season. |
| 1920 | Staleys; 10–0 | Cubs Field | Tied; 1–1 | First meeting at Cubs Field. |
| 1921 | Tie; 0–0 | Cubs Field | Tie; 1–1–1 | First home game of the matchup for the Staleys. First matchup with the Staleys as a Chicago-based team, and the match tied for the lowest-scoring matchup in league history. Staleys win 1921 APFA Championship |
| 1922 | Cardinals; 6–0 | Comiskey Park | Cardinals; 2–1–1 | The APFA renames itself as the National Football League (NFL). The Cardinals' first season is called "Chicago." "Staleys" rename themselves as the "Bears." The first game in Comiskey Park. Thanksgiving Day game. |
| 1922 | Cardinals; 9–0 | Comiskey Park | Cardinals; 3–1–1 | |
| 1923 | Bears; 3–0 | Cubs Field | Cardinals; 3–2–1 | Thanksgiving Day game. |
| 1924 | Bears; 6–0 | Cubs Park | Tie; 3–3–1 | |
| 1924 | Bears; 21–0 | Comiskey Park | Bears; 4–3–1 | Thanksgiving Day game. Bears take the lead in the rivalry |
| 1925 | Cardinals; 9–0 | Comiskey Park | Tie; 4–4–1 | |
| 1925 | Tie; 0–0 | Cubs Park | Tie; 4–4–2 | Thanksgiving Day game. Cardinals win 1925 NFL Championship. |
| 1926 | Bears; 16–0 | Cubs Park | Bears; 5–4–2 | |
| 1926 | Bears; 10–0 | Soldier Field | Bears; 6–4–2 | First game at Soldier Field |
| 1926 | Tie; 0–0 | Cubs Park | Bears; 6–4–3 | Thanksgiving Day game. |
| 1927 | Bears; 9–0 | Normal Park | Bears; 7–4–3 | |
| 1927 | Cardinals; 3–0 | Wrigley Field | Bears; 7–5–3 | Cubs Field is renamed Wrigley Field. Thanksgiving Day game. |
| 1928 | Bears; 15–0 | Normal Park | Bears; 8–5–3 | Final game at Normal Field |
| 1928 | Bears; 34–0 | Wrigley Field | Bears; 9–5–3 | Thanksgiving Day game. |
| 1929 | Tie; 0–0 | Wrigley Field | Bears; 9–5–4 | |
| 1929 | Cardinals; 40–6 | Comiskey Park | Bears; 9–6–4 | Thanksgiving Day game. |

1930s (Bears, 17–1–2)

| Season | Results | Location | Overall series | Notes |
|---|---|---|---|---|
| 1930 | Bears; 32–6 | Comiskey Park | Bears; 10–6–4 | |
| 1930 | Bears; 6–0 | Wrigley Field | Bears; 11–6–4 | Thanksgiving Day game. |
| 1931 | Bears; 26–13 | Wrigley Field | Bears; 12–6–4 | Cardinals' first home game at Wrigley Field |
| 1931 | Bears; 18–7 | Wrigley Field | Bears; 13–6–4 | Thanksgiving Day game. |
| 1932 | Tie; 0–0 | Wrigley Field | Bears; 13–6–5 | |
| 1932 | Bears; 24–0 | Wrigley Field | Bears; 14–6–5 | Thanksgiving Day game. Bears win 1932 NFL Championship |
| 1933 | Bears; 12–9 | Wrigley Field | Bears; 15–6–5 | |
| 1933 | Bears; 22–6 | Wrigley Field | Bears; 16–6–5 | Final Thanksgiving Day game to date for the matchup. Bears win 1933 NFL Championship. |
| 1934 | Bears; 20–0 | Wrigley Field | Bears; 17–6–5 | |
| 1934 | Bears; 17–6 | Wrigley Field | Bears; 18–6–5 | Bears lose 1934 NFL Championship. |
| 1935 | Tie; 7–7 | Wrigley Field | Bears; 18–6–6 | Latest tied game in the matchup |
| 1935 | Bears; 13–0 | Wrigley Field | Bears; 19–6–6 | |
| 1936 | Bears; 7–3 | Wrigley Field | Bears; 20–6–6 | |
| 1936 | Cardinals; 14–7 | Wrigley Field | Bears; 20–7–6 | |
| 1937 | Bears; 16–7 | Wrigley Field | Bears; 21–7–6 | |
| 1937 | Bears; 42–28 | Wrigley Field | Bears; 22–7–6 | Bears lose 1937 NFL Championship. |
| 1938 | Bears; 16–13 | Wrigley Field | Bears; 23–7–6 | |
| 1938 | Bears; 34–28 | Wrigley Field | Bears; 24–7–6 | |
| 1939 | Bears; 44–7 | Wrigley Field | Bears; 25–7–6 | |
| 1939 | Bears; 48–7 | Wrigley Field | Bears; 26–7–6 | |

1940s (Bears, 14–6)

| Season | Results | Location | Overall series | Notes |
|---|---|---|---|---|
| 1940 | Cardinals; 21–7 | Comiskey Park | Bears; 26–8–6 | First season back at Comiskey Park for the Cardinals, Wednesday game |
| 1940 | Bears; 31–23 | Wrigley Field | Bears; 27–8–6 | Bears win 1940 NFL Championship. |
| 1941 | Bears; 53–7 | Wrigley Field | Bears; 28–8–6 | |
| 1941 | Bears; 34–24 | Comiskey Park | Bears; 29–8–6 | Bears win 1941 NFL Championship. |
| 1942 | Bears; 41–14 | Wrigley Field | Bears; 30–8–6 | |
| 1942 | Bears; 21–7 | Comiskey Park | Bears; 31–8–6 | The Bears go 11–0 in the regular season. Bears lose 1942 NFL Championship. |
| 1943 | Bears; 20–0 | Wrigley Field | Bears; 32–8–6 | |
| 1943 | Bears; 35–24 | Comiskey Park | Bears; 33–8–6 | Bears win 1943 NFL Championship. |
| 1944 | Bears; 34–7 | Wrigley Field | Bears; 34–8–6 | Cardinals temporarily merged with the Pittsburgh Steelers for the season and was known as "Card-Pitt" |
| 1944 | Bears; 49–7 | Forbes Field | Bears; 35–8–6 | Only matchup at Forbes Field |
| 1945 | Cardinals; 16–7 | Wrigley Field | Bears; 35–9–6 | Cardinals ended a 29-game losing streak — the longest in NFL history — with their win, which also snapped the Bears' 21-game home unbeaten streak. This win would also be their only one in the 1945 season. |
| 1945 | Bears; 28–20 | Comiskey Park | Bears; 36–9–6 | |
| 1946 | Bears; 34–17 | Comiskey Park | Bears; 37–9–6 | |
| 1946 | Cardinals; 35–28 | Wrigley Field | Bears; 37–10–6 | Cardinals' win is the Bears' only home loss in the 1946 season. Bears win 1946 NFL Championship. |
| 1947 | Cardinals; 31–7 | Comiskey Park | Bears; 37–11–6 | |
| 1947 | Cardinals; 30–21 | Wrigley Field | Bears; 37–12–6 | Cardinals win 1947 NFL Championship. |
| 1948 | Bears; 28–17 | Comiskey Park | Bears; 38–12–6 | Monday night game. Bears' win is the Cardinals only regular season loss in the 1948 season. |
| 1948 | Cardinals; 24–21 | Wrigley Field | Bears; 38–13–6 | Cardinals' win is the Bears' only home loss in the 1948 season. Cardinals lose 1948 NFL Championship. |
| 1949 | Bears; 17–7 | Comiskey Park | Bears; 39–13–6 | With the win, the Bears ended the Cardinals' 11-game regular season winning streak. |
| 1949 | Bears; 52–21 | Wrigley Field | Bears; 40–13–6 | Final matchup as a Western Division rival. |

1950s (Bears, 7–6)

| Season | Results | Location | Overall series | Notes |
|---|---|---|---|---|
| 1950 | Bears; 27–6 | Wrigley Field | Bears; 41–13–6 | |
| 1950 | Cardinals; 20–10 | Comiskey Park | Bears; 41–14–6 | |
| 1951 | Cardinals; 16–7 | Comiskey Park | Bears; 41–15–6 | |
| 1951 | Cardinals; 28–20 | Wrigley Field | Bears; 41–16–6 | |
| 1952 | Cardinals; 21–10 | Comiskey Park | Bears; 41–17–6 | |
| 1952 | Bears; 10–7 | Wrigley Field | Bears; 42–17–6 | |
| 1953 | Cardinals; 24–17 | Wrigley Field | Bears; 42–18–6 | The Cardinals recorded their first and only win of the 1953 season in the season finale, avoiding finishing the season with no wins and ending their 13-game winless streak. |
| 1954 | Bears; 29–7 | Comiskey Park | Bears; 43–18–6 | |
| 1955 | Cardinals; 53–14 | Comiskey Park | Bears; 43–19–6 | |
| 1956 | Bears; 10–3 | Wrigley Field | Bears; 44–19–6 | Bears lose 1956 NFL Championship. |
| 1957 | Bears; 14–6 | Comiskey Park | Bears; 45–19–6 | |
| 1958 | Bears; 30–14 | Wrigley Field | Bears; 46–19–6 | |
| 1959 | Bears; 31–7 | Comiskey Park | Bears; 47–19–6 | The Cardinals play their final game in the matchup as a Chicago-based franchise. |

1960s (Tie, 2–2)

| Season | Results | Location | Overall series | Notes |
|---|---|---|---|---|
| 1965 | Bears; 34–13 | Wrigley Field | Bears; 48–19–6 | First matchup as a Chicago-St. Louis rivalry. |
| 1966 | Cardinals; 24–17 | Civic Center Busch Memorial Stadium | Bears; 48–20–6 | The first game of the matchup is in St. Louis. |
| 1967 | Bears; 30–3 | Wrigley Field | Bears; 49–20–6 | Final game of the matchup at Wrigley Field |
| 1969 | Cardinals; 20–17 | Civic Center Busch Memorial Stadium | Bears; 49–21–6 | Final matchup before the NFL-AFL merger |

1970s (Bears, 3–2)

| Season | Results | Location | Overall series | Notes |
|---|---|---|---|---|
| 1972 | Bears; 27–10 | Civic Center Busch Memorial Stadium | Bears; 50–21–6 | |
| 1975 | Cardinals; 34–20 | Soldier Field | Bears; 50–22–6 | |
| 1977 | Cardinals; 16–13 | Civic Center Busch Memorial Stadium | Bears; 50–23–6 | |
| 1978 | Bears; 17–10 | Soldier Field | Bears; 51–23–6 | |
| 1979 | Bears; 42–6 | Soldier Field | Bears; 52–23–6 | |

1980s (Cardinals, 2–0)

| Season | Results | Location | Overall series | Notes |
|---|---|---|---|---|
| 1982 | Cardinals; 10–7 | Soldier Field | Bears; 52–24–6 | |
| 1984 | Cardinals; 38–21 | Busch Memorial Stadium | Bears; 52–25–6 | Final matchup as a Chicago-St. Louis rivalry |

1990s (Bears, 2–1)

| Season | Results | Location | Overall series | Notes |
|---|---|---|---|---|
| 1990 | Bears; 31–21 | Sun Devil Stadium | Bears; 53–25–6 | First time in the matchup where the Cardinals are a Phoenix-based franchise. First matchup at Sun Devil Stadium. |
| 1994 | Bears; 19–16 | Sun Devil Stadium | Bears; 54–25–6 | |
| 1998 | Cardinals; 20–7 | Sun Devil Stadium | Bears; 54–26–6 | Final time in the matchup at Sun Devil Stadium. |

2000s (Bears, 3–1)

| Season | Results | Location | Overall series | Notes |
|---|---|---|---|---|
| 2001 | Bears; 20–13 | Soldier Field | Bears; 55–26–6 | |
| 2003 | Bears; 28–3 | Soldier Field | Bears; 56–26–6 | |
| 2006 | Bears; 24–23 | University of Phoenix Stadium | Bears 57–26–6 | First game in the matchup at University of Phoenix Stadium. Bears overcome 20-point deficit. This led to Dennis Green's infamous post-game quote, "The Bears are who we thought they were, and we let them off the hook." Bears lose Super Bowl XLI. |
| 2009 | Cardinals; 41–21 | Soldier Field | Bears; 57–27–6 | |

2010s (Bears, 2–1)

| Season | Results | Location | Overall series | Notes |
|---|---|---|---|---|
| 2012 | Bears; 28–13 | University of Phoenix Stadium | Bears; 58–27–6 | |
| 2015 | Cardinals; 48–23 | Soldier Field | Bears; 58–28–6 | |
| 2018 | Bears; 16–14 | State Farm Stadium | Bears; 59–28–6 | Cardinals turn the ball over four consecutive possessions in the second half as Bears comeback from a 14–3 halftime deficit. |

2020s (Cardinals, 2–1)

| Season | Results | Location | Overall series | Notes |
|---|---|---|---|---|
| 2021 | Cardinals; 33–22 | Soldier Field | Bears; 59–29–6 | |
| 2023 | Bears; 27–16 | Soldier Field | Bears; 60–29–6 | |
| 2024 | Cardinals; 29–9 | State Farm Stadium | Bears; 60–30–6 | |

Summary of Results

| Season | Season series | at Decatur Staleys/Chicago Staleys/Chicago Bears | at Racine/Chicago/St. Louis/Phoenix/Arizona Cardinals | Notes |
|---|---|---|---|---|
| Regular season | Bears 60–30–6 | Bears 32–13–5 | Bears 28–17–1 | |

== Players who played for both teams ==
| Name | Pos. | Years with Bears | Years with Cardinals |
|---|---|---|---|
| Jeff Blake | QB | 2005 | 2003 |
| Kevin Butler | K | 1985–1995 | 1996–1997 |
| Guy Chamberlin | End | 1920–1921 | 1927 |
| Chris Chandler | QB | 2002–2003 | 1991–1993 |
| Marcus Cooper | CB | 2017–2018 | 2016 |
| Dave Duerson | S | 1983–1989 | 1991–1993 |
| Ted Ginn Jr. | WR | 2020 | 2014 |
| Mike Glennon | QB | 2017 | 2018 |
| Brian Hoyer | QB | 2016 | 2012 |
| Thomas Jones | RB | 2004–2006 | 2000–2002 |
| Walt Kiesling | G | 1934 | 1929–1933 |
| Dave Krieg | QB | 1996 | 1995 |
| Cassius Marsh | LB | 2021 | 2019 |
| Wilber Marshall | LB | 1984–1987 | 1994 |
| Josh McCown | QB | 2011–2013 | 2002–2005 |
| Jim McMahon | QB | 1982–1988 | 1994 |
| Mike Nugent | K | 2017 | 2009, 2020 |
| Ricky Proehl | WR | 1997 | 1990–1994 |
| Antrel Rolle | CB | 2015 | 2005–2009 |
| Chester Taylor | RB | 2010 | 2011 |
| Javon Wims | WR | 2018–2020 | 2022 |

== See also ==
=== Other Chicago vs. Chicago rivalries ===
- Cubs–White Sox rivalry (MLB)

=== Other Chicago vs. St. Louis rivalries ===
- Cardinals–Cubs rivalry (MLB)
- Blackhawks–Blues rivalry (NHL)
