= 1906 World Series =

1906 Major League Baseball championship series

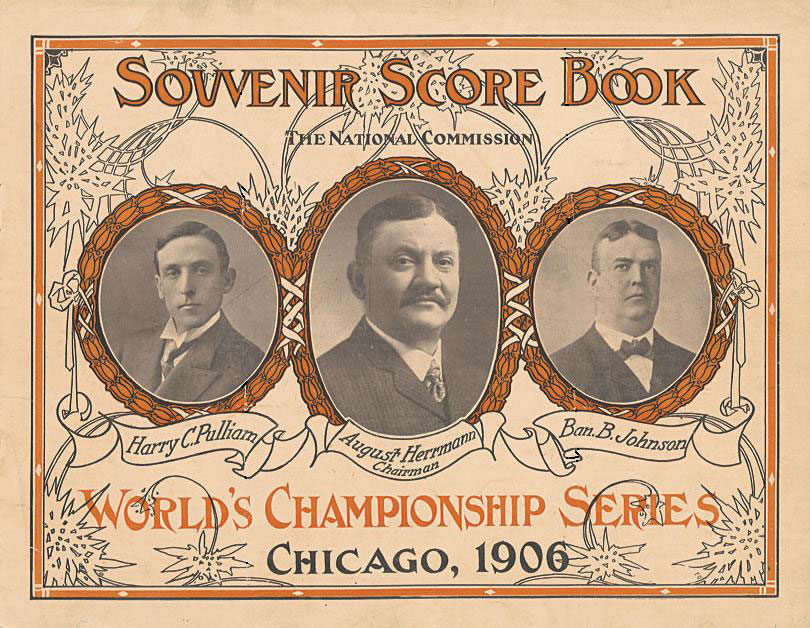
- A program featuring league presidents Ban Johnson and Harry Pulliam, and National Baseball Commission President August Herrmann
Team (Wins)	Managers	Season
Chicago White Sox (4)	Fielder Jones (player/manager)	93–58, .616, GA: 3
Chicago Cubs (2)	Frank Chance (player/manager)	116–36, .763, GA: 20
- Dates: October 9–14
- Venue(s): West Side Grounds (Chicago Cubs); South Side Park (Chicago White Sox)
- Umpires: Jim Johnstone (NL); Silk O'Loughlin (AL)
- Hall of Famers: White Sox: George Davis; Ed Walsh; Cubs: Mordecai Brown; Frank Chance; Johnny Evers; Joe Tinker

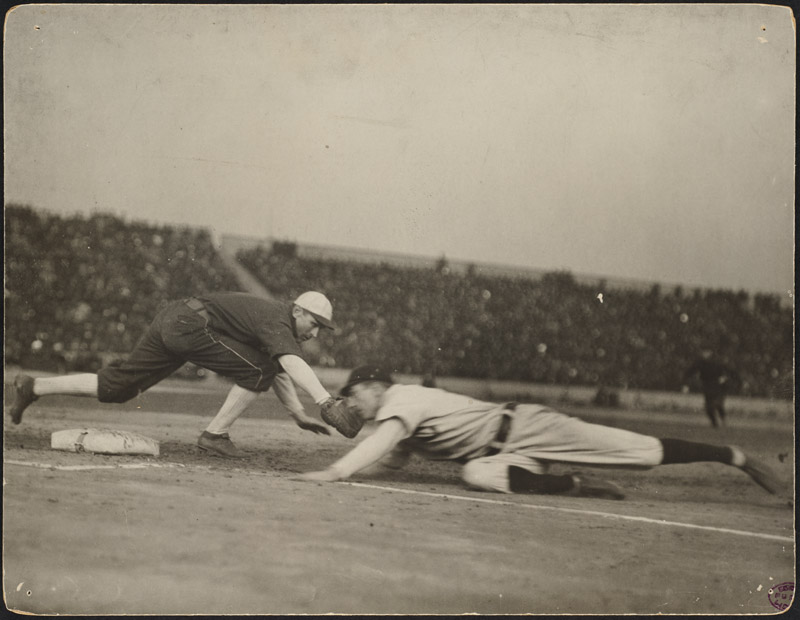
Pickoff attempt during one of the games. Frank Chance slides in safely past the tag of Jiggs Donahue.

The 1906 World Series was the championship series in Major League Baseball for the 1906 season. The third edition of the World Series, it featured a crosstown matchup between the American League (AL) champion Chicago White Sox and the National League (NL) champion Chicago Cubs. The Cubs had posted the highest regular-season win total (116) and winning percentage (.763) in the major leagues since the advent of the modern era in 1901. The White Sox, known as the "Hitless Wonders" after finishing with the worst team batting average (.230) in the American League, beat the Cubs in six games for one of the greatest upsets in Series history as the Sox out-pitched the Cubs in their first two wins and out-hit them in their last two. The White Sox won their first championship in franchise history, and this was the first major professional sports championship ever won by a Chicago-based team. The home teams alternated, starting with the National League Cubs being home in Game 1.

The teams split the first four games; then the Hitless Wonders (a name coined by sportswriter Charles Dryden) exploded for 26 hits in the last two games. True to their nickname, the White Sox hit only .198 as a team in winning the series, but it beat the .196 average produced by the Cubs. In Game 3, White Sox pitcher Ed Walsh struck out 12 Cubs, breaking the previous record of 11 set by Bill Dinneen in 1903.

National interest in the Series was strong. Ahead of the third game, backers in Denver, Colorado offered a guarantee of US$10,000 (equivalent to $358,333 in 2025) to host the seventh game of the series should it be necessary. The Spokane (Washington) Chamber of Commerce offered US$15,000 (equivalent to $537,500 in 2025) for the game. The Series would remain in Chicago and finish in six games.

The 1906 World Series was the first to be played between two teams from the same metropolitan area or state. This series along with the 1944 edition (contested between the St. Louis Cardinals and St. Louis Browns), and the 1989 edition (contested between the San Francisco Giants and Oakland Athletics) are the only such instances outside of New York City where two teams from the same metropolitan area played in the World Series. This was also the last World Series where both teams were making their first appearance in the Fall Classic, something that is currently impossible without future expansion (as the Seattle Mariners are currently the only team in the league to have never appeared in a World Series).

== Summary ==
AL Chicago White Sox (4) vs. NL Chicago Cubs (2)

Game	Date	Score	Location	Time	Attendance
1	October 9	Chicago White Sox – 2, Chicago Cubs – 1	West Side Grounds	1:45	12,693
2	October 10	Chicago Cubs – 7, Chicago White Sox – 1	South Side Park	1:58	12,595
3	October 11	Chicago White Sox – 3, Chicago Cubs – 0	West Side Grounds	2:10	13,667
4	October 12	Chicago Cubs – 1, Chicago White Sox – 0	South Side Park	1:36	18,385
5	October 13	Chicago White Sox – 8, Chicago Cubs – 6	West Side Grounds	2:40	23,257
6	October 14	Chicago Cubs – 3, Chicago White Sox – 8	South Side Park	1:55	19,249

== Matchups ==
=== Game 1 ===
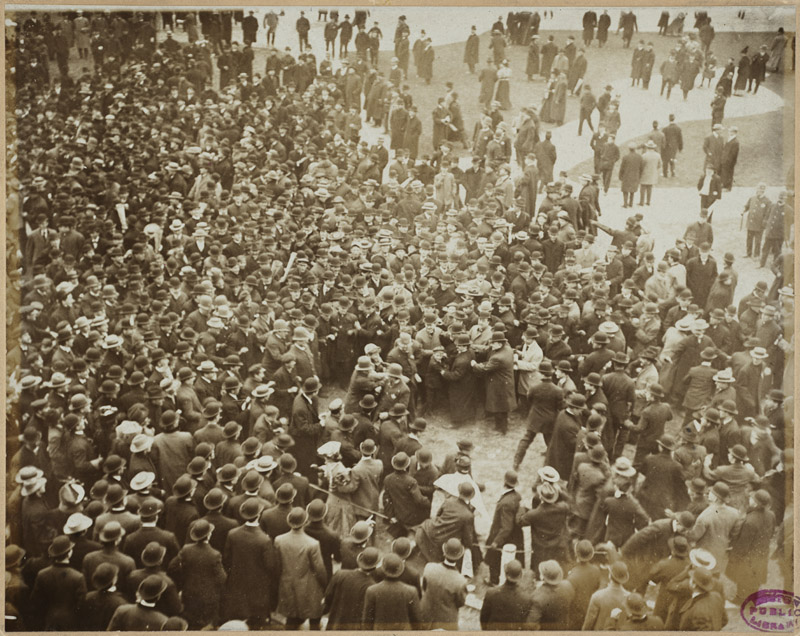
After game 1, Fans rush the field and police protect Nick Altrock

Tuesday, October 9, 1906 at West Side Grounds in Chicago, Illinois
Team	1	2	3	4	5	6	7	8	9	R	H	E
Chicago (AL)	0	0	0	0	1	1	0	0	0	2	4	1
Chicago (NL)	0	0	0	0	0	1	0	0	0	1	4	2
WP: Nick Altrock (1–0) LP: Mordecai Brown (0–1); Boxscore

White Sox starter Nick Altrock faced Cub starter Mordecai "Three-Fingered" Brown in game 1. Both were perfect through three innings. The Cubs put a runner on second in the bottom of the fourth inning, but couldn't score. In the top of the fifth, George Rohe tripled to lead off, then scored on an error at home when Patsy Dougherty reached on a fielder's choice. The Sox scored a second run in the top of the sixth. Altrock walked, and was sacrificed to second base by Ed Hahn. Fielder Jones then singled to center but Altrock was thrown out at the plate, Jones taking second on the throw home. He took third on Cub catcher Johnny Kling's passed ball, and Frank Isbell drove him home with a single. The Cubs struck back in their half of the sixth. Kling walked and Brown singled with nobody out. After Solly Hofman sacrificed the runners to second and third, Altrock's wild pitch scored Kling and sent Brown to third, giving him little margin for error with only one out, but he got Jimmy Sheckard to pop out and Frank Schulte to ground out to end the threat. He pitched beautifully for the rest of the game, allowing only one more Cub to reach second, retaining the 2–1 lead for a Game 1 Sox win.

=== Game 2 ===
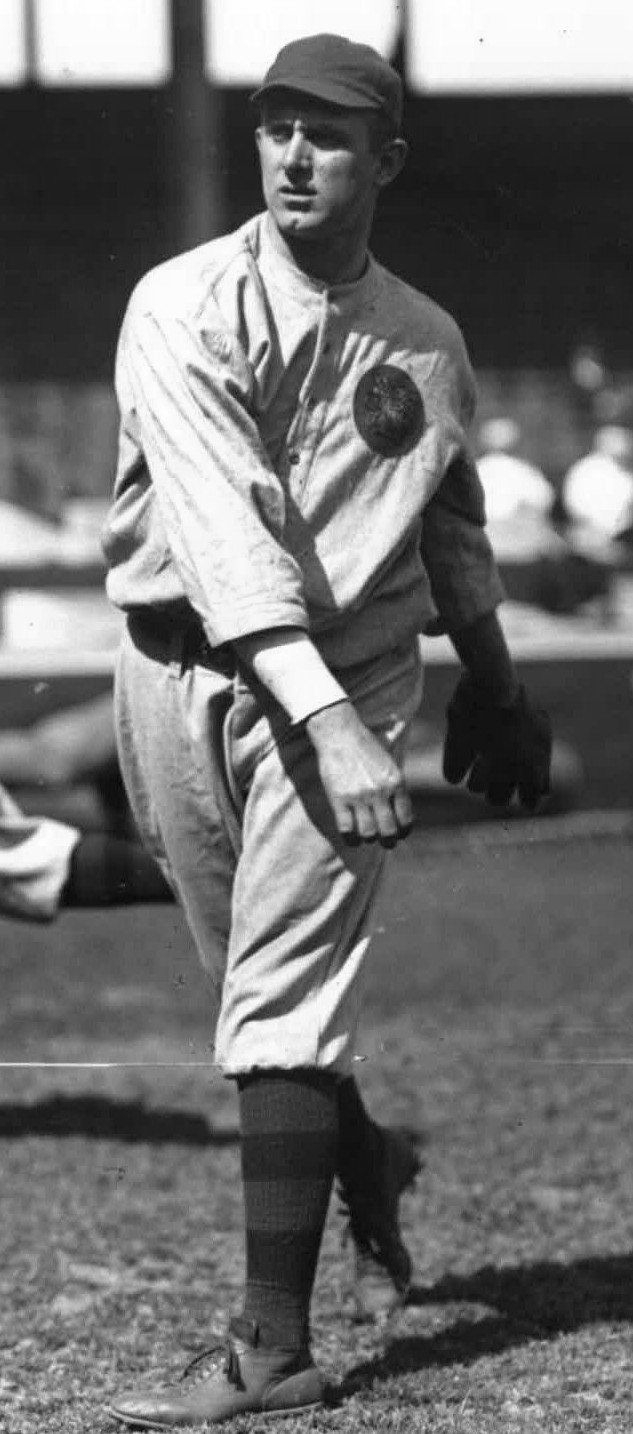
Ed Reulbach, winning pitcher of Game 2

Wednesday, October 10, 1906 at South Side Park in Chicago, Illinois
Team	1	2	3	4	5	6	7	8	9	R	H	E
Chicago (NL)	0	3	1	0	0	1	0	2	0	7	10	2
Chicago (AL)	0	0	0	0	1	0	0	0	0	1	1	3
WP: Ed Reulbach (1–0) LP: Doc White (0–1); Boxscore

Ed Reulbach was called on for the Cubs to face White Sox hurler Doc White. After matching 1–2–3 first innings, things started to fall apart for White. After cleanup-hitting first baseman Frank Chance led off the top of the second with a strikeout, third baseman Harry Steinfeldt singled to left field and shortstop Joe Tinker beat out a bunt. Cubs second baseman Johnny Evers then reached on a two-base error by White Sox second baseman Frank Isbell, scoring Steinfeldt for an unearned run and moving Tinker and Evers to second and third. Catcher Johnny Kling was then intentionally walked to load the bases and bring up the pitcher, still with only one out. Reulbach squeeze-bunted Tinker home for a second unearned run, moving Evers to third and Kling to second with two out. Solly Hofman followed with an infield single to shortstop Lee Tannehill, scoring Evers for a third unearned run, but when Kling tried to score from second, he was thrown out at home plate, ending the rally. The Cubs added a fourth unearned run in the third, ending Doc White's day on the mound. The Sox scored in the bottom of the fifth inning with an unearned run, thanks to a wild pitch and an error. The Cubs scored three more runs, all earned, in the sixth and eighth to win Game 2 7–1 and tie the Series at one game apiece. Reulbach pitched the first one-hitter in World Series history.

=== Game 3 ===
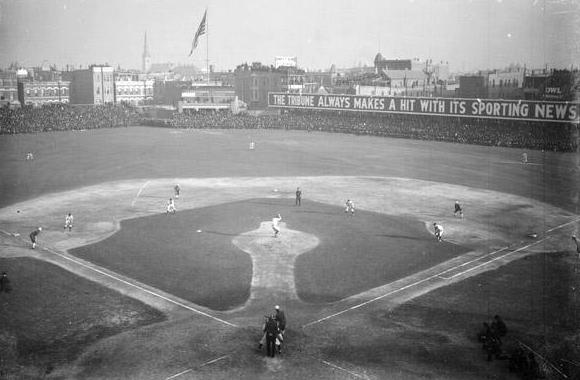
Jack Pfiester pitching in Game 3

Thursday, October 11, 1906 at West Side Grounds in Chicago, Illinois
Team	1	2	3	4	5	6	7	8	9	R	H	E
Chicago (AL)	0	0	0	0	0	3	0	0	0	3	4	1
Chicago (NL)	0	0	0	0	0	0	0	0	0	0	2	2
WP: Ed Walsh (1–0) LP: Jack Pfiester (0–1); Boxscore

After allowing two first-inning hits, Sox starter "Big Ed" Walsh didn't give up another and struck out 12, giving the Sox a 2–1 edge in the series. After Fred Schulte's first inning two-out double, Walsh retired the next 25 of 27 Cub batters to face him. Third baseman George Rohe cracked a two-out, bases-loaded triple to left in the top of the sixth off Jack Pfiester for the only runs of the game.

=== Game 4 ===
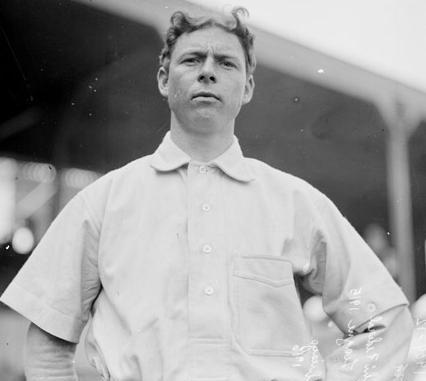
Game 4 winning pitcher Mordecai Brown

Friday, October 12, 1906 at South Side Park in Chicago, Illinois
Team	1	2	3	4	5	6	7	8	9	R	H	E
Chicago (NL)	0	0	0	0	0	0	1	0	0	1	7	1
Chicago (AL)	0	0	0	0	0	0	0	0	0	0	2	1
WP: Mordecai Brown (1–1) LP: Nick Altrock (1–1); Boxscore

Looking to even the Series, the Cubs started Mordecai Brown on one day's rest who pitched 5 2/3 innings of no-hit ball for the Cubs before settling for a two-hitter. Nick Altrock, who faced and defeated Brown in game 1, was the hard-luck loser, with the only run of the game coming on Johnny Evers' two-out single in the top of the seventh scoring Frank Chance. The Sox put the tying run on second base in the top of the ninth thanks to a two-out walk and a passed ball, but Frank Isbell grounded out to end the threat. The game took just 96 minutes and evened the Series at two games apiece.

=== Game 5 ===
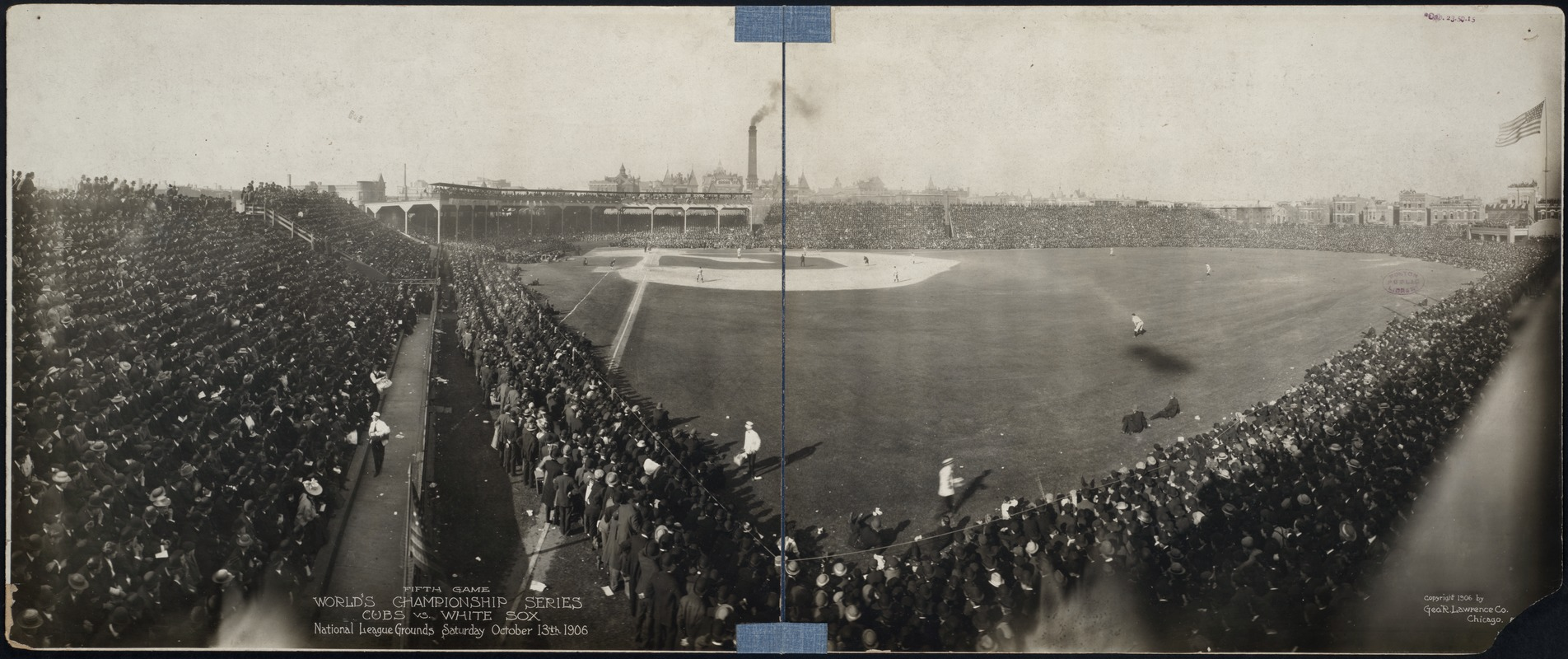
Game 5 at West Side Grounds

Saturday, October 13, 1906 at West Side Grounds in Chicago, Illinois
Team	1	2	3	4	5	6	7	8	9	R	H	E
Chicago (AL)	1	0	2	4	0	1	0	0	0	8	12	6
Chicago (NL)	3	0	0	1	0	2	0	0	0	6	6	0
WP: Ed Walsh (2–0) LP: Jack Pfiester (0–2) Sv: Doc White (1); Boxscore

Game 5 was a wild affair with a total of 18 hits, ten walks, six errors, two hit batsmen, three wild pitches and a steal of home. The Cubs allowed a first inning run to the Sox, then scored three unearned runs on two Sox errors to take an early lead. The Sox tied the game in the third on George Davis' theft of home on the front end of a double steal and then took the lead for good with a four-run rally in the fourth and held on for the victory to take a 3–2 lead in the series. A 12-hit attack led by Frank Isbell's four doubles were enough to overcome seven unearned runs by the Cubs caused by six errors committed by the normally solid Sox defense. "Big" Ed Walsh earned his second win of the series, although he needed three innings of relief help from Doc White.

Isbell would remain the sole major league player to get four extra-base hits in one postseason game until Shohei Ohtani hit two doubles and two home runs in Game 3 of the 2025 World Series.

=== Game 6 ===
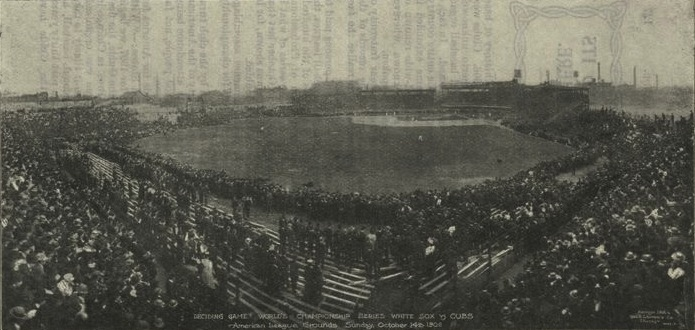
South Side Park during Game 6

Sunday, October 14, 1906 at South Side Park in Chicago, Illinois
Team	1	2	3	4	5	6	7	8	9	R	H	E
Chicago (NL)	1	0	0	0	1	0	0	0	1	3	7	0
Chicago (AL)	3	4	0	0	0	0	0	1	X	8	14	3
WP: Doc White (1–1) LP: Mordecai Brown (1–2); Boxscore

Mordecai Brown, again pitching on only one day of rest, didn't make it out of the second inning as the Hitless Wonders White Sox stunned the 116–36 Cubs in the Series finale. The Sox battered Brown for seven runs on eight hits while getting a solid pitching performance from Doc White. Although the Cubs scored a run and loaded the bases in the ninth, White got Frank Schulte to ground out for the final out of the series and the White Sox won the World Series.

The powerful Cubs went on to win the next two World Series from the Detroit Tigers, despite falling far short of 116 wins in either season, for the last Cubs win in a World Series for over a hundred years.

This game remains the only time the Chicago White Sox have clinched a postseason series in their home ballpark. It was the only time a Chicago-based team had ever clinched a series at home until the Cubs won the 2015 National League Division Series on their home field.

== Composite line score ==
1906 World Series (4–2): Chicago White Sox (A.L.) over Chicago Cubs (N.L.)

Team	1	2	3	4	5	6	7	8	9	R	H	E
Chicago White Sox	4	4	2	4	2	5	0	1	0	22	37	15
Chicago Cubs	4	3	1	1	1	4	1	2	1	18	36	7
Total attendance: 99,846 Average attendance: 16,641; Winning player's share: $1,875 Losing player's share: $440

== Firsts and lasts ==
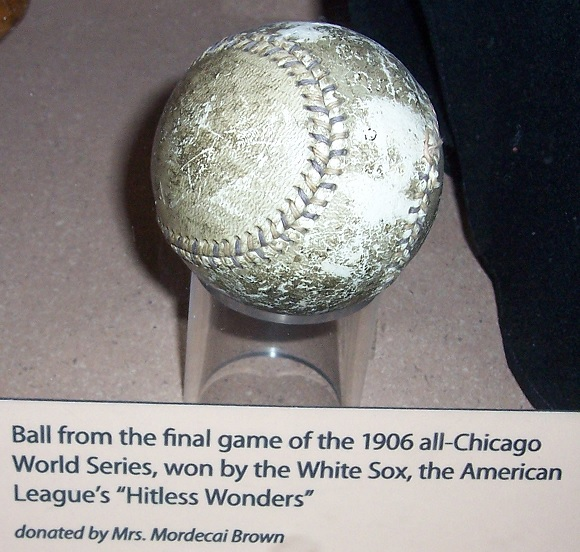
A ball from the series on display at the Baseball Hall of Fame. The ball was used in Game Six, the final game, of the world series

- The 1906 World Series was the first appearance in the World Series for both teams, and the first of three in a row for the Cubs. The White Sox next appeared in the World Series in 1917. The next season that both Chicago teams qualified for the postseason was 2008.
- This remains the most recent World Series to feature two franchises that had never before appeared in a World Series. The feat currently cannot be duplicated, barring further MLB expansion, as when the Washington Nationals reached the 2019 World Series, it left only one MLB team (the Seattle Mariners) that has never been to the Fall Classic.
- This was the first modern World Series contested between two teams based in the same metropolitan area. Between 1921 and 1956, 13 World Series were held that had both teams based in New York City, which came to be called Subway Series.
- The 1906 World Series was the first World Series appearance for the Cubs' infield trio of Joe Tinker (shortstop), Johnny Evers (second base), and Frank Chance (first base), later the subjects of "Baseball's Sad Lexicon" ("Tinker to Evers to Chance"). The trio hit a combined 9-for-59 (.153) in the series.
- Two future Hall of Fame pitchers appeared: Ed Walsh for the White Sox and Mordecai Brown for the Cubs. However, this pair did not pitch against each other in any game of the Series. Ed Walsh pitched the most dominant game of the Series in Game 3 based on a game score of 94, striking out 12 and allowing no runs on 2 hits in a complete game performance.
- In striking out 12 batters in Game 3, Walsh struck out at least one batter in all nine innings, the first pitcher to do so in a World Series game. Bob Gibson in the 1968 World Series opener was the next pitcher to accomplish this feat.
- The first five games of the Series were won by the road team. This unusual occurrence was duplicated exactly 90 years later in the 1996 World Series. The feat was duplicated again in the 2019 World Series.
- Doc White recorded the first ever World Series save in Game 5. Saves were not officially recognized as a statistic until 1969, but the stat has been retrofitted by historians.
- Games 1 and 2 were played amid snow flurries in Chicago. This next happened in a World Series in 1997.
- Bill O'Neill of the White Sox became the first pinch runner in series history during the sixth inning of Game 3 when he came in to run for Eddie Hahn.
- White Sox outfielder Patsy Dougherty became the first player both to play in and to win two World Series. He had previously played for the Boston Americans in the 1903 World Series.
- Both White Sox catcher Billy Sullivan and Cubs outfielder Jimmy Sheckard went 0–21 in the series, establishing a World Series record for most at-bats in a series without recording a hit that wouldn't be broken until 1968; Sullivan's 22 plate appearances without reaching base remains a World Series record.

== See also ==
- Cubs–White Sox rivalry
