= Ed Reulbach =

American baseball player (1882–1961)

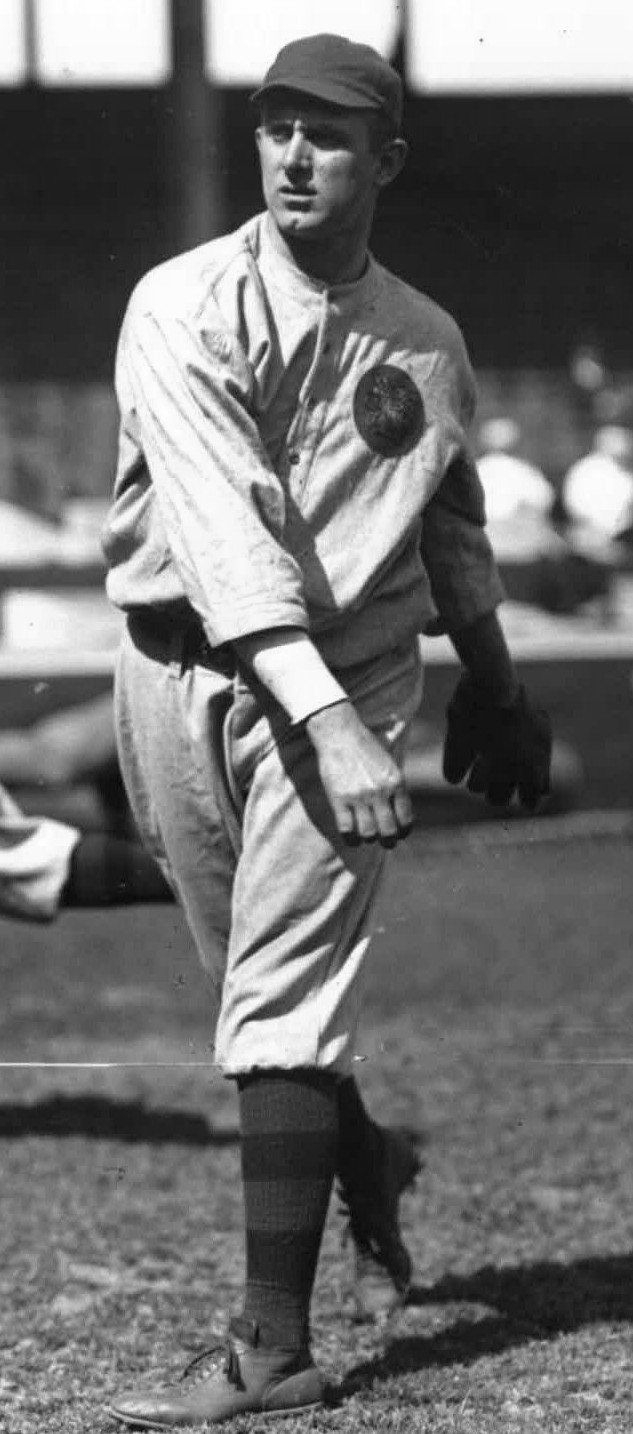
- Reulbach with the Boston Braves in 1916
- Pitcher
- Born: December 1, 1882; Detroit, Michigan, U.S.
- Died: July 17, 1961 (aged 78); Glens Falls, New York, U.S.
- Batted: Right Threw: Right

MLB debut
- May 16, 1905, for the Chicago Cubs

Last MLB appearance
- July 13, 1917, for the Boston Braves

MLB statistics
- Win–loss record: 182–106
- Earned run average: 2.28
- Strikeouts: 1,137
- Stats at Baseball Reference

Teams
- Chicago Cubs (1905–1913); Brooklyn Dodgers (1913–1914); Newark Pepper (1915); Boston Braves (1916–1917)

Career highlights and awards
- World Series champion (1907, 1908); Chicago Cubs Hall of Fame

Edward Marvin "Big Ed" Reulbach (December 1, 1882 – July 17, 1961) was an American pitcher in Major League Baseball. He helped the Chicago Cubs win the 1907 and 1908 World Series.

== Career ==
Reulbach played college baseball at the University of Notre Dame in 1903 and 1904. He played for the University of Vermont in 1905, accumulating a 4–0 record before signing a contract with the Cubs in May.

Reulbach won at least 17 games in every season from 1905 to 1909. In the 1906 World Series (ultimately won in six games by the Chicago White Sox), Reulbach shone in Game 2 at South Side Park, giving up only one hit, a seventh-inning single to Jiggs Donahue. No one pitched a one-hitter in the World Series again until fellow Cubs pitcher Claude Passeau in 1945; both were later surpassed by Don Larsen's perfect game in Game 5 of the 1956 World Series.

Reulbach helped the Cubs win the 1907 World Series. His best year was 1908, when he won 24 games for the World Series champion Cubs, their last Series championship until 2016. Reulbach pitched two shutouts in one day against the Brooklyn Superbas on September 26, 1908. No other pitcher has ever accomplished this feat in the major leagues.

Reulbach played for the Cubs until 1913. He then had short stints with Brooklyn, the Newark Pepper, and the Boston Braves before retiring from baseball in 1917. He finished his MLB career with a 182–106 win–loss record, a 2.28 earned run average, a 123 ERA+, and 1,137 strikeouts in 2,632.1 innings pitched.

Reulbach died on July 17, 1961, the same day as Ty Cobb. A Roman Catholic, he was buried in the Immaculate Conception Cemetery, Montclair. Reulbach was the last surviving Chicago Cub to have played in the 1907 and 1908 World Series.

== See also ==
- List of Major League Baseball career ERA leaders
- List of Major League Baseball career WHIP leaders
- List of Major League Baseball career shutout leaders
- List of Major League Baseball career hit batsmen leaders

Preceded by Nap Rucker	Brooklyn Dodgers Opening Day starting pitcher 1914	Succeeded by Jeff Pfeffer
