= Nick Altrock =

American baseball player and coach (1876–1965)

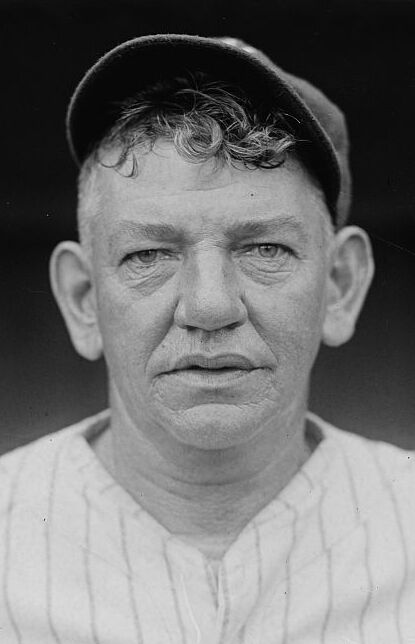
- Altrock in 1925
- Pitcher
- Born: September 15, 1876; Cincinnati, Ohio, U.S.
- Died: January 20, 1965 (aged 88); Washington, D.C., U.S.
- Batted: Switch Threw: Left

MLB debut
- July 14, 1898, for the Louisville Colonels

Last MLB appearance
- October 1, 1933, for the Washington Senators

MLB statistics
- Win–loss record: 83–75
- Earned run average: 2.65
- Strikeouts: 425
- Stats at Baseball Reference

Teams
- As player: Louisville Colonels (1898); Boston Americans (1902–1903); Chicago White Sox (1903–1909); Washington Senators (1909, 1912–1915, 1918–1919, 1924, 1929, 1931, 1933); As coach: Washington Senators (1912–1953)

Career highlights and awards
- 2× World Series champion (1906, 1924)

Nicholas Altrock (September 15, 1876 – January 20, 1965) was an American professional baseball player and coach. He played in the major leagues as a left-handed pitcher between 1898 and 1919. After the 1919 season he continued to make periodic appearances as a pinch hitter for many years, until his final game at the age of 57. As a player, Altrock was a member of two World Series winning teams and then won a third World Series as a coach. He was a coach for the Washington Senators for many years.

== Early life ==
Altrock was born in Cincinnati, to German immigrant parents.

== Career ==
Altrock was one of the better pitchers in baseball for a brief period from 1904 to 1906 with the Chicago White Sox. He was instrumental in the White Sox World Series championship in 1906, going 20–13 with a 2.06 earned run average in the regular season and 1–1 with a Series-best 1.00 earned run average against the Chicago Cubs.

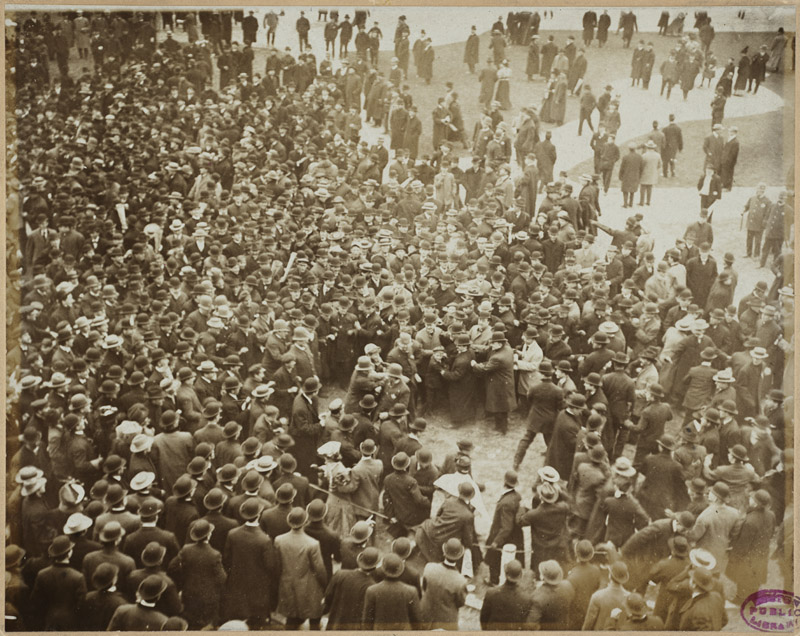
Police protect Nick Altrock from crowds after pitching a 4 hitter during game 1 of the 1906 World Series. Notice that they are on the infield, as it was common practice for fans to walk on the field after a game.

An arm injury after 1906 ruined his career, but he hung on with the White Sox and Washington Senators until 1924, though he pitched very little after 1908 and made sporadic pinch-hitting appearances after that, including one in 1933 (facing Rube Walberg of the Philadelphia Athletics) at 57 years of age. He appeared in major league games in five different decades, one of only two players to do this (Minnie Miñoso is the other); he is one of only 29 players in baseball history to have appeared in major league games in four decades.

Altrock became a coach for the Senators in 1912 and remained on the Washington staff through 1953, a 42-year skein that represents the longest consecutive-year tenure of a coach with the same franchise in baseball history. Some Senator scorecards continued to list Altrock as a "coach emeritus" even after his formal retirement.

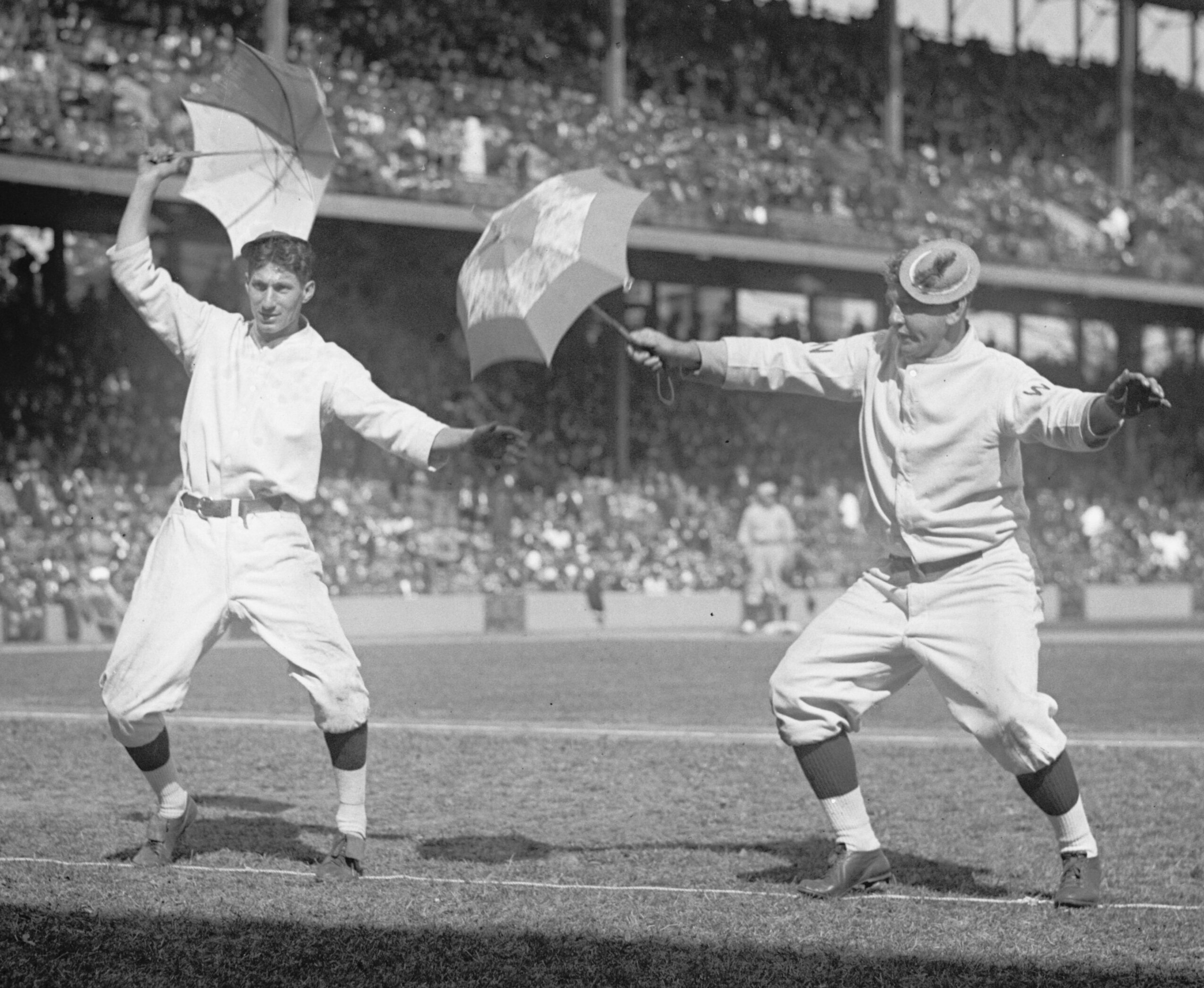
Al Schacht and Nick Altrock, 1925

During that time, he was noted for his antics in the coaching box and teamed with Al Schacht, the "Clown Prince of Baseball", for a dozen years to perform comedy routines on baseball fields in the days before official mascots. Schacht and Altrock also took their antics to the vaudeville stage where they appeared in a comedy routine. At the height of their collaboration, Schacht and Altrock developed a deep personal animosity and stopped speaking with each other off the field. During their famous comic re-enactments of the Dempsey–Tunney championship boxing match, many speculated that they pulled no punches as they rained blows on each other.

An anecdote, probably apocryphal, has been printed in some baseball books about a quip by Altrock during his coaching days with the Senators. A batter had hit a ball into the stands and it was not known whether it was fair or foul. The umpire, who had been the target of Altrock's gibes, made the call and shortly afterward a woman was carried from the stands on a litter. The umpire asked Altrock if the ball had hit the woman. In his clear voice, Nick answered, "No. You called that one right and she passed out from shock."

He was the second oldest position player to play in a major league game when he played in 1933 at the age of 57.

== Later life ==
Altrock lived for many years in the Columbia Heights neighborhood of Washington, D.C., with his wife Eleanor, and died at age 88 in 1965. He is interred at Vine Street Hill Cemetery in Cincinnati.

== See also ==
- List of Major League Baseball players who played in four decades
