= Jack Pfiester =

American baseball player (1878–1953)

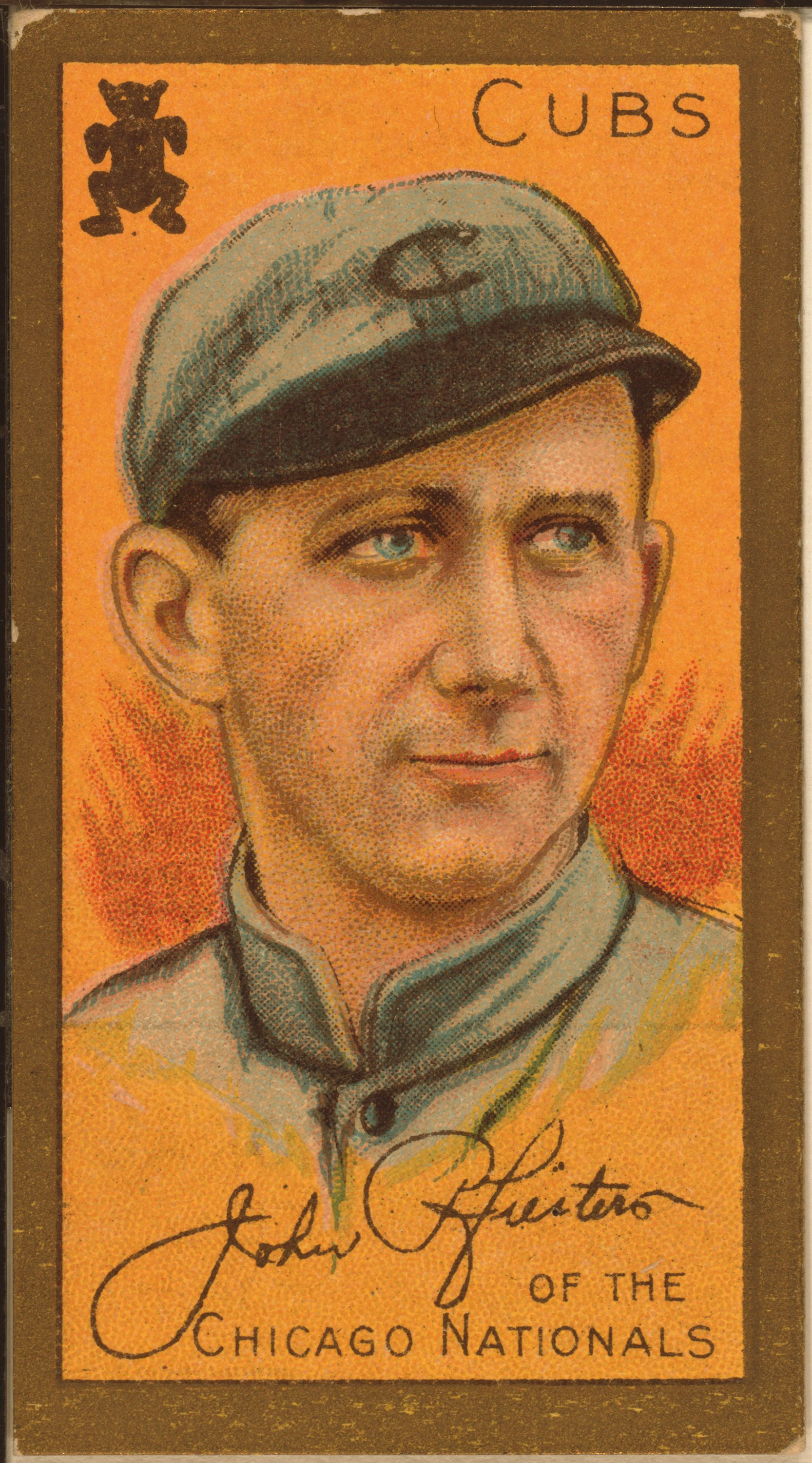
- Baseball card of Pfiester
- Pitcher
- Born: May 24, 1878; Cincinnati, Ohio, U.S.
- Died: September 3, 1953 (aged 75); Loveland, Ohio, U.S.
- Batted: Right Threw: Left

MLB debut
- September 8, 1903, for the Pittsburgh Pirates

Last MLB appearance
- May 10, 1911, for the Chicago Cubs

MLB statistics
- Win–loss record: 71–44
- Earned run average: 2.02
- Strikeouts: 503
- Stats at Baseball Reference

Teams
- Pittsburgh Pirates (1903–1904); Chicago Cubs (1906–1911)

Career highlights and awards
- 2× World Series champion (1907, 1908); NL ERA leader (1907)

John Albert Pfiester (May 24, 1878 – September 3, 1953) was an American professional baseball pitcher. He played in Major League Baseball for the Pittsburgh Pirates and Chicago Cubs from 1903 to 1911 and helped the Cubs win two World Series championships.

== Career ==
Born in Cincinnati, Ohio, Pfiester started his professional baseball career in the minor leagues in 1901. He played briefly for the Pirates in 1903 and 1904. In 1904, Pfiester played mostly for the Omaha Rangers of the Western League. He had a win–loss record of 24–11 for Omaha and helped the team win the league championship. In 1905, with the renamed Omaha Rourkes, Pfiester went 25–11 with a 1.76 earned run average. He had the second-most wins in the Western League. That year, he was purchased by the Cubs.

In 1906, Pfiester played his first full major league season and went 20–8 with a 1.51 ERA, the second-best ERA in the National League. The 1906 Cubs had one of the best MLB seasons ever, winning the NL pennant and finishing with 116 wins. However, they were defeated in the 1906 World Series, with Pfiester going 0–2 in the series. The following year, he went 14–9 and led the NL with a 1.15 ERA. He won his only start of the 1907 World Series in Game 2, and the Cubs won the series.

On September 23, 1908, during the Merkle's Boner game against the New York Giants, Pfiester pitched a complete game, allowing five hits, with a dislocated tendon in his pitching forearm. He had to be assisted off the field a few times after throwing curveballs. As soon as the game ended, he went to Ohio to be treated, and his tendon was snapped back into place by trainer Bonesetter Reese. Pfiester finished the season with a record of 12–10. After National League President Harry Pulliam ruled the Merkle's Boner game to have ended in a tie, Pfeister was called upon by Cubs manager Frank Chance to start the makeup game on October 8 in New York. Pfeister gave up a run in less than an inning of work before Chance had seen enough and called in Mordecai Brown, who held the Giants to just one run the rest of the way, ensuring a 4–2 Cubs triumph to capture the NL pennant. Pfeister lost his only start of the 1908 World Series in Game 3, but the Cubs won the series. It was the team's last championship until 2016.

Pfiester went 17–6 with a 2.43 ERA in 1909. In 1910, his last full season in professional baseball, he went 6–3. He pitched in the 1910 World Series but did not get a decision, and the Cubs lost. In 1911, Pfiester went 1–4 before the Cubs traded him to the minor leagues in May, and he never played in the majors again. Pfiester finished his MLB career with a 71–44 win–loss record. His career ERA in MLB was 2.02, which is the fourth-lowest of all time among pitchers with at least 1,000 innings thrown.

After his baseball career ended, Pfiester settled in Ohio with his wife and their son, Jack Jr. Pfiester died in Loveland, Ohio of a blood ailment at the age of 75.

== See also ==
- List of Major League Baseball annual ERA leaders
- List of Major League Baseball career ERA leaders
- List of Major League Baseball career WHIP leaders
