= Doc White =

American baseball player (1879–1969)

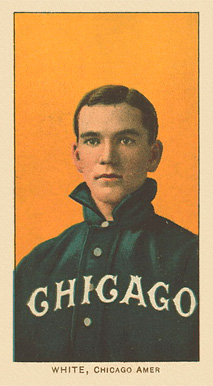
- Baseball card of White
- Pitcher
- Born: April 9, 1879; Washington, D.C., U.S.
- Died: February 19, 1969 (aged 89); Silver Spring, Maryland, U.S.
- Batted: Left Threw: Left

MLB debut
- April 22, 1901, for the Philadelphia Phillies

Last MLB appearance
- October 4, 1913, for the Chicago White Sox

MLB statistics
- Win–loss record: 189–156
- Earned run average: 2.39
- Strikeouts: 1,384
- Stats at Baseball Reference

Teams
- Philadelphia Phillies (1901–1902); Chicago White Sox (1903–1913)

Career highlights and awards
- World Series champion (1906); MLB wins leader (1907); AL ERA leader (1906)

Guy Harris "Doc" White (April 9, 1879 – February 19, 1969) was an American left-handed pitcher in Major League Baseball. He played for the Philadelphia Phillies and the Chicago White Sox during his career, which lasted from 1901 to 1913.

== Early life ==
Born in Washington, D.C., White was a graduate of the Georgetown University School of Dentistry, hence his nickname "Doc".

== Baseball career ==
White started his professional baseball career in 1901 with the National League's Philadelphia Phillies. In 1903, he jumped to the Chicago White Sox of the American League.

From 1903 to 1906, White won at least 16 games each year; his earned run average was in the league's top four each year, as well. In 1906, he went 18–6 and led the AL with a 1.52 ERA and a 167 ERA+. The White Sox won the pennant and their first World Series. In the series, White made two starts and one relief appearance. He went 1–1 with a 1.80 ERA, and in game 5, he recorded the first save in series history.

In 1907, White led the league with 27 wins, which was also his career-high. He pitched effectively for Chicago until 1912, had an off-year in 1913, and then played in the Pacific Coast League from 1914 to 1915.

White finished his MLB career with a 189–156 win–loss record, a 2.39 ERA, a 113 ERA+, and 1,384 strikeouts in 3,041 innings pitched. He was a good-hitting pitcher, posting a .217 batting average with 2 home runs, 147 runs scored, and 75 runs batted in. White also played 85 games in the outfield and several games at first base and second base.

== Music ==
White gained some recognition as a composer, publishing at least four songs (such as bestseller "Little Puff of Smoke, Good Night" in 1910) with his co-writer Ring Lardner, who was a sportswriter in Chicago during that time.

== Death ==
White died at age 89 in Silver Spring, Maryland, just eight months after witnessing Don Drysdale surpass his record of 45 consecutive scoreless innings on June 4, 1968. He was the last surviving member of the 1906 World Series champion White Sox.

== See also ==
- List of Major League Baseball career ERA leaders
- List of Major League Baseball annual ERA leaders
- List of Major League Baseball annual wins leaders
