= 1901 Baltimore Orioles season =

American baseball team season

1901 Baltimore Orioles
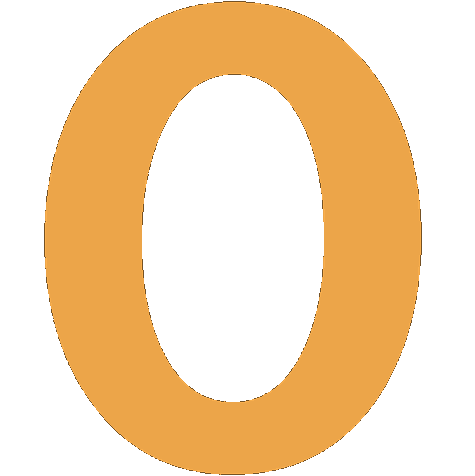
- League: American League
- Ballpark: Oriole Park
- City: Baltimore, Maryland
- Record: 68–65 (.511)
- League place: 5th
- Owners: Sydney Frank
- Managers: John McGraw

The 1901 Baltimore Orioles season finished with the Orioles in 5th in the American League with a record of 68–65. The team was managed by John McGraw and played at Oriole Park.

== Regular season ==
=== Season standings ===
American League
Team	W	L	Pct.	GB	Home	Road
Chicago White Stockings	83	53	.610	—	49‍–‍21	34‍–‍32
Boston Americans	79	57	.581	4	49‍–‍20	30‍–‍37
Detroit Tigers	74	61	.548	8½	42‍–‍27	32‍–‍34
Philadelphia Athletics	74	62	.544	9	42‍–‍24	32‍–‍38
Baltimore Orioles	68	65	.511	13½	40‍–‍25	28‍–‍40
Washington Senators	61	72	.459	20½	31‍–‍35	30‍–‍37
Cleveland Blues	54	82	.397	29	28‍–‍39	26‍–‍43
Milwaukee Brewers	48	89	.350	35½	32‍–‍37	16‍–‍52

=== Record vs. opponents ===
1901 American League record Sources:
Team	BAL	BOS	CWS	CLE	DET	MIL	PHA	WSH
Baltimore	—	9–9	4–14–1	11–9	9–10	12–7–1	12–8	11–8
Boston	9–9	—	12–8	12–6	9–11–1	15–5	10–10	12–8–1
Chicago	14–4–1	8–12	—	13–7	10–10	16–4	12–8	10–8
Cleveland	9–11	6–12	7–13	—	6–14	11–9	6–14	9–9–2
Detroit	10–9	11–9–1	10–10	14–6	—	13–7	7–9	9–11
Milwaukee	7–12–1	5–15	4–16	9–11	7–13	—	6–14	10–8–1
Philadelphia	8–12	10–10	8–12	14–6	9–7	14–6	—	11–9–1
Washington	8–11	8–12–1	8–10	9–9–2	11–9	8–10–1	9–11–1	—

=== Roster ===
1901 Baltimore Orioles
**Roster**
**Pitchers**: Frank Foreman; Harry Howell; Bill Karns; Joe McGinnity; Jerry Nops; Crazy Schmit; Stan Yerkes	**Catchers**: Roger Bresnahan; Tacks Latimer; Wilbert Robinson; **Infielders**: Jack Dunn; Frank Foutz; Jimmy Hart; Slats Jordan; Bill Keister; John McGraw; George Rohe; Jimmy Williams	**Outfielders**: Steve Brodie; Mike Donlin; Jim Jackson; Cy Seymour; Chappie Snodgrass	**Manager**: John McGraw

=== Game log ===
Games legend
Orioles Win	Orioles Loss	Game postponed	Clinched Playoff Spot	Eliminated from Playoff Race
**Boldface** text denotes an Orioles pitcher

Baltimore Orioles 1901 Season Game Log — Season Record: (0–0) – home (0–0) – road (0–0)
April (2–2) – home (7–5) – road (9–6)

#	Date	Opponent	Score	Win	Loss	Save	Stadium	Attendance	Record	Box/ Streak
1	April 26	Americans	10–6					1–0		
2	April 27	Americans	12–6					2–0		
3	April 29	Senators	2–5					2–1		
3	April 30	Senators	6–12					2–2		

May (11–10) – home (7–7) – road (8–6)

#	Date	Opponent	Score	Win	Loss	Save	Stadium	Attendance	Record	Box/ Streak
5	May 1	Senators	6–4					3–2		
6	May 2	Senators	11–4					4–2		
7	May 3	Athletics	4–9					4–3		
8	May 4	Athletics	11–7					5–3		
9	May 6	Athletics	5–6							
10	May 7	Athletics	14–10							
11	May 8	Athletics	5–1							
12	May 11	Athletics	6–7							
13	May 13	Athletics	14–5							
14	May 14	Athletics	11–5							
15	May 15	Athletics	14–5							
16	May 16	@ Americans	8–7							
17	May 17	@ Americans	2–7							
18	May 25	@ Brewers	3–6							
19	May 26	@ White Stockings	0–5							
20	May 27	@ White Stockings	3–10							
21	May 28	@ White Stockings	14–5							
22	May 29	@ White Stockings	4–7							
23	May 30	@ Tigers	10–7							
24	May 30	@ Tigers	1–4							
25	May 31	@ Tigers	5–5							

June (14–8) – home (12–6) – road (2–2)

#	Date	Opponent	Score	Win	Loss	Save	Stadium	Attendance	Record	Box/ Streak
26	June 1	@ Tigers	3–1							
27	June 3	@ Bluebirds	7–2							
28	June 4	@ Bluebirds	1–5							
29	June 6	@ Bluebirds	2–4							
30	June 7	Bluebirds	10–9							
31	June 8	Bluebirds	5–13							
32	June 10	Bluebirds	6–13							
33	June 11	Bluebirds	5–8							
34	June 12	Bluebirds	8–1							
35	June 13	White Stockings	0–12							
36	June 14	White Stockings	5–10							
37	June 17	White Stockings	6–7							
38	June 18	Brewers	11–4							
39	June 19	Brewers	9–3							
40	June 20	Brewers	7–2							
41	June 21	Tigers	4–3							
42	June 22	Tigers	10–3							
43	June 24	Tigers	17–8							
44	June 25	Tigers	4–2							
45	June 27	Athletics	9–5							
46	June 28	Athletics	6–3							
47	June 29	Athletics	15–3							

July (0–0) – home (0–0) – road (0–0)

#	Date	Opponent	Score	Win	Loss	Save	Stadium	Attendance	Record	Box/ Streak
48	July 1	Americans	7–5							
49	July 2	Americans	8–10							
50	July 3	Americans	1–9							
51	July 4	Americans	2–10							
52	July 4	Americans	3–8							
53	July 5	Athletics	5–3							
54	July 6	Athletics	5–8							
55	July 8	Senators	8–7							
56	July 9	Senators	3–1							
57	July 10	Senators	5–1							
58	July 11	Senators	6–2							
59	July 12	Senators	12–14							
60	July 15	Senators	2–3							
60	July 15	Senators	7–3							
61	July 17	@ White Stockings	2–4							
62	July 18	@ White Stockings	1–9							
63	July 19	@ White Stockings	7–4							
64	July 20	@ Brewers	13–11							
65	July 21	@ Brewers	10–6							
66	July 21	@ Brewers	7–5							
67	July 22	@ Brewers	3–5							
68	July 24	@ Bluebirds	9–6							
69	July 25	@ Bluebirds	5–1							
70	July 26	@ Bluebirds	6–1							
71	July 27	@Tigers	0–1							
72	July 28	@ Tigers	4–6							
73	July 29	@ Tigers	10–5							
74	July 31	@ Tigers	4–6							

== Player stats ==
=== Batting ===
==== Starters by position ====
Note: Pos = Position; G = Games played; AB = At bats; H = Hits; Avg. = Batting average; HR = Home runs; RBI = Runs batted in

Pos	Player	G	AB	H	Avg.	HR	RBI
C	Roger Bresnahan	86	295	79	.268	1	32
1B	Jimmy Hart	58	206	64	.311	0	23
2B	Jimmy Williams	130	501	113	.317	7	96
3B	John McGraw	73	232	81	.349	0	28
SS	Bill Keister	115	442	145	.328	2	93
OF	Cy Seymour	134	547	166	.303	1	77
OF	Jim Jackson	99	364	91	.250	2	50
OF	Steve Brodie	83	306	95	.310	2	41

==== Other batters ====
Note: G = Games played; AB = At bats; H = Hits; Avg. = Batting average; HR = Home runs; RBI = Runs batted in

Player	G	AB	H	Avg.	HR	RBI
Mike Donlin	121	476	162	.340	5	67
Jack Dunn	96	362	90	.249	0	36
Wilbert Robinson	68	239	72	.301	0	26
Frank Foutz	20	72	17	.236	2	14
George Rohe	14	36	10	.278	0	4
Chappie Snodgrass	3	10	1	.100	0	1
Tacks Latimer	1	4	1	.250	0	0
Slats Jordan	1	3	0	.000	0	0

=== Pitching ===
==== Starting pitchers ====
Note: G = Games pitched; IP = Innings pitched; W = Wins; L = Losses; ERA = Earned run average; SO = Strikeouts

Player	G	IP	W	L	ERA	SO
Joe McGinnity	48	382.0	26	20	3.56	75
Harry Howell	37	294.2	14	21	3.67	93
Frank Foreman	24	191.1	12	6	3.67	41
Jerry Nops	27	176.2	12	10	4.08	43
Crazy Schmit	4	22.2	0	2	1.99	2
Stan Yerkes	1	8.0	0	1	6.75	4

==== Other pitchers ====
Note: G = Games pitched; IP = Innings pitched; W = Wins; L = Losses; ERA = Earned run average; SO = Strikeouts

Player	G	IP	W	L	ERA	SO
Jack Dunn	9	59.2	3	3	3.62	5
Bill Karns	3	17.0	1	0	6.35	5
Roger Bresnahan	2	6.0	0	1	6.00	3
