= Joe McGinnity =

American baseball player (1871–1929)

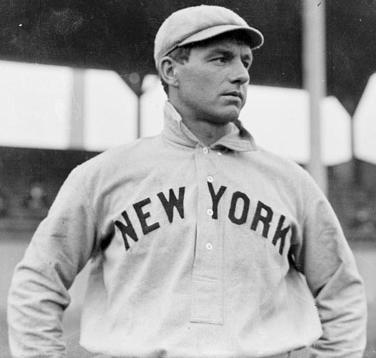
- McGinnity in 1905
- Pitcher
- Born: March 20, 1871; Cornwall Township, Illinois, U.S.
- Died: November 14, 1929 (aged 58); Brooklyn, New York, U.S.
- Batted: Right Threw: Right

MLB debut
- April 18, 1899, for the Baltimore Orioles

Last MLB appearance
- October 5, 1908, for the New York Giants

MLB statistics
- Win–loss record: 246–142
- Earned run average: 2.66
- Strikeouts: 1,068
- Stats at Baseball Reference

Teams
- Baltimore Orioles (NL) (1899); Brooklyn Superbas (1900); Baltimore Orioles (AL) (1901–1902); New York Giants (1902–1908)

Career highlights and awards
- World Series champion (1905); 5× NL wins leader (1899, 1900, 1903, 1904, 1906); NL ERA leader (1904)

Member of the National

Baseball Hall of Fame
- Induction: 1946
- Election method: Old-Timers Committee

Joseph Jerome McGinnity (March 20, 1871 – November 14, 1929) was an American right-handed pitcher in Major League Baseball (MLB) in the late 19th and early 20th century. McGinnity played in MLB for ten years, pitching for the National League's (NL) Baltimore Orioles (1899) and Brooklyn Superbas (1900), before jumping to the American League (AL) to play for the Baltimore Orioles (AL) (1901–1902). He returned to the NL with the New York Giants (1902–1908). McGinnity continued to pitch in the minor leagues, eventually retiring from baseball for good at the age of 54.

In MLB, he won 246 games with a 2.66 earned run average (ERA). He had seven 20-win seasons and two 30-win seasons. Including his time in the minor leagues, McGinnity won close to 500 games as a professional ballplayer. He led MLB in wins five times (1899, 1900, 1903, 1904, and 1906) and ERA once (1904). With the Giants, he won the 1905 World Series. His teams also won NL pennants in 1900 and 1904.

McGinnity was nicknamed "Iron Man" because he worked in an iron foundry during the baseball offseasons. His nickname came to convey his longevity and durability, as he routinely pitched in both games of doubleheaders. He set an NL record for innings pitched (434) in a single season, which still stands (and with modern MLB practices which limit pitchers' innings, is considered effectively unbreakable). McGinnity is considered one of the better players in the history of the New York Giants. The Veterans Committee elected him to the National Baseball Hall of Fame in 1946.

== Early life ==
McGinnity's father, Peter, was born in Dublin, Ireland. His last name was McGinity before he came to United States. He changed it by adding an "n" after he emigrated to the United States in 1861. Peter worked in coal mines and on the farm owned by John and Rebecca Denning, and they accepted him, allowing him to move in with them in their Henry County farm. John and Rebecca moved to Oregon, leaving the homestead in the hands of Peter and their daughter, Hannah. The two married in August 1865, three months before the birth of their first son, William. Their second son, Peter, was born in 1869, and Joe was their third born. Joseph Jerome McGinnity was born on March 20, 1871, in Cornwall Township, Illinois. The McGinnitys had four more children.

Joe received little formal schooling. Due to the transient lifestyle of coal miners, his family moved frequently during his childhood. The McGinnitys moved to Gallatin County in 1878. Two days after the birth of their seventh child, Peter died in an accident. At the age of eight, Joe and his older brothers went to work in the mines to support their family. In 1880, the family moved to Springfield, Illinois, where Joe and his brothers worked for the Springfield Coal Company. They moved to Decatur, Illinois, less than six months later, continuing to mine coal, while their mother cleaned houses.

== Semiprofessional career ==
While living in Decatur, McGinnity began playing baseball with other coal miners in their leisure time. The owner of the Decatur Coal Company founded the Decatur Baseball Association in 1886. An outfielder, McGinnity substituted for his team's pitcher in an 1888 game, which he won. He continued to pitch from that point on. He pitched for semi-professional teams based in Decatur in 1888 and 1889. His family headed west, stopping in the Indian Territory on their way to Montana, where Hannah's sister struck gold in their coal mine. McGinnity and his brothers worked in a coal mine in Krebs. There, he met his future wife, Mary Redpath, the oldest daughter of a fellow coal miner. McGinnity also played baseball for the local team. He increased baseball's popularity in the area, and was later referred to as "the father of Oklahoma baseball" by a sportswriter for The Oklahoman, as he organized, managed, and pitched for teams in Krebs. One of these teams began traveling to other towns along the Missouri–Kansas–Texas Railroad to play against their local teams. He also pitched for teams in neighboring towns.

I have never seen a pitcher with more confidence in himself than McGinnity had. He was so cocksure of his fielding ability that he would take any sort of chance, throwing to any base under any circumstance, and this fielding ability lifted him out of many tight spots.

— Hughie Jennings

== Professional career ==
=== Minor leagues ===
John McCloskey, the manager of the minor league baseball Montgomery Colts of the Class-B Southern League, heard about McGinnity's pitching. McCloskey signed McGinnity, who made his professional debut with the Colts in 1893. McCloskey habitually baited umpires during games, a trait which McGinnity learned. The league folded as a result of financial troubles related to the Panic of 1893. Jimmie Manning, manager of the Southern League franchise in Savannah, Georgia, became manager of the Kansas City Blues of the Class-A Western League for the 1894 season, and signed McGinnity to pitch for the Blues. Combined for Montgomery and Kansas City, McGinnity had a 21–29 win–loss record, while walking more batters than he could strikeout, and allowing more than a hit per inning pitched. According to a Western League umpire, catcher Tim Donahue tipped McGinnity's pitches to opposing batters due to a personal feud. As McGinnity continued to struggle for Kansas City, he requested his release in June.

McGinnity moved to Springfield, Illinois, where he worked as a coal miner, bartender, and operated a saloon. McGinnity also pitched locally for semi-professional teams in Springfield and Decatur, receiving a salary between $1 and $3 (between $37.21 and $116.1 in current dollar terms) for each game. During this time, McGinnity developed a sidearm pitch he nicknamed "Old Sal", described as a "slow curve", which became a feature of his later success. He also improved his fielding, as opponents attempted to bunt "Old Sal".

While pitching for a semi-professional team, McGinnity defeated the National League's (NL) Baltimore Orioles in an exhibition game after he had already defeated a team from Chatham, Illinois, earlier in the day. Pat Wright, who managed Springfield's semi-professional team, was named manager of the Peoria Distillers of the Class-B Western Association, and he signed McGinnity to Peoria for the 1898 season, marking his return to professional baseball. Armed with "Old Sal", McGinnity compiled a 9–4 record for Peoria, allowing only 118 hits and 60 walks while striking out 74 batters in 142 innings. He pitched a complete 21-inning game, believed to be the second longest professional baseball game to date. With low attendance and the distraction of the Spanish–American War, the Western Association folded in August.

=== Baltimore Orioles (NL) (1899) ===
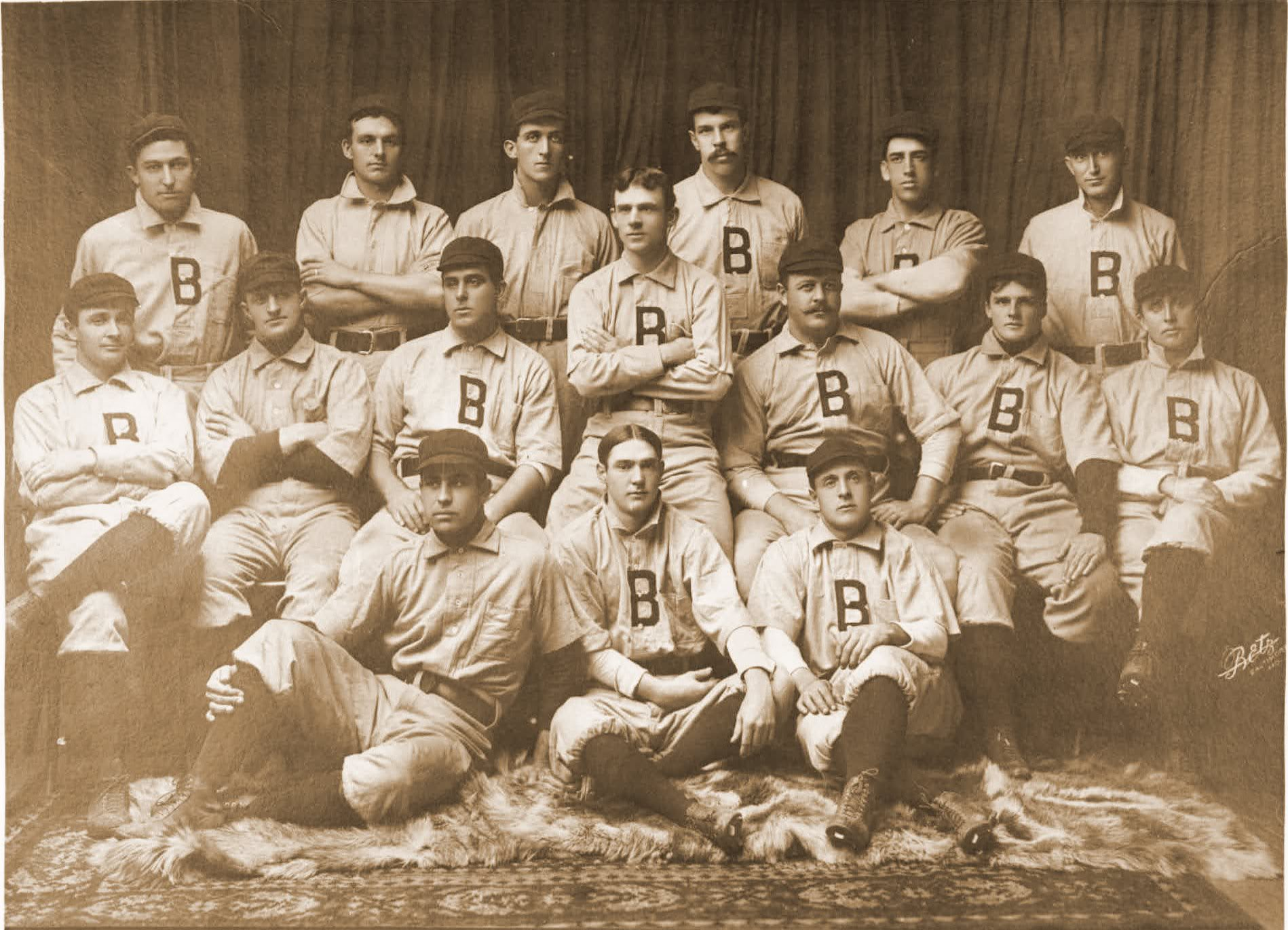
McGinnity (top row, second from left) with the 1899 Baltimore Orioles

Former Brooklyn Grooms player George Pinkney, who lived in Peoria during his retirement, saw McGinnity pitch, and contacted Brooklyn owner Charles Ebbets to recommend he sign McGinnity. He signed McGinnity in the spring of 1899 for $150 a month ($5,805 in current dollar terms). The syndicate that owned Brooklyn also owned the Baltimore Orioles.

With the ownership consolidation, Orioles player-manager Ned Hanlon, who received an ownership stake in the clubs, moved from Baltimore to Brooklyn and assigned many of his best players to Brooklyn, including Joe Kelley, Dan McGann, Hughie Jennings and Willie Keeler. Hanlon assigned McGinnity to the Orioles for the 1899 season after seeing his unorthodox pitching delivery and slow pitching speed. With the Orioles, McGinnity played with John McGraw, who succeeded Hanlon as player-manager, and Wilbert Robinson, who caught McGinnity. McGraw and Robinson had refused to relocate to Brooklyn due to their investment in a Baltimore restaurant. The two imparted their aggressive style of play to McGinnity. In his first year in the NL, McGinnity had a 28–16 record. His 28 wins led the NL, while he ranked second with 48 games, third with a 2.68 earned run average (ERA), and fourth with 366 1/3 innings pitched.

=== Brooklyn Superbas (1900) ===
After the 1899 season, the NL voted to contract four teams, which included the Orioles. Hanlon assigned McGinnity to Brooklyn, now known as the "Superbas". McGinnity posted a 28–8 record for Brooklyn in the 1900 season. His 28 wins and 343 innings pitched led the league, as the Dodgers won the NL pennant. McGinnity also pitched two complete games in the Chronicle-Telegraph Cup, as the Superbas defeated the Pittsburgh Pirates. Rather than draw straws to decide who would keep the trophy, the team voted to award it to McGinnity.

With the formation of the American League (AL) as a competitor to the NL, and rumors that the AL's Detroit Tigers were interested in McGinnity, Brooklyn offered McGinnity a $5,000 contract ($186,058 in current dollar terms) to stay with Brooklyn.

=== Baltimore Orioles (AL) (1901–1902) ===
McGinnity considered retiring from baseball, but ultimately jumped to the AL, signing with the Baltimore Orioles of the AL before the 1901 season. He received a salary of $2,800 ($104,192 in current dollar terms), choosing less money in an upstart league for the chance to be reunited with McGraw, who was player-manager and part-owner of the Orioles.

Fighting continued to erupt in games McGraw managed. During a brawl that erupted during a game against the Detroit Tigers on August 21, 1901, McGinnity spat on umpire Tom Connolly. McGinnity was arrested for the incident and permanently suspended by AL president Ban Johnson, who wanted there to be no fighting in AL games. Johnson later cut the suspension down to 12 days after McGinnity apologized. McGinnity compiled a 26–20 record for the 1901 Orioles, and his 48 games, 39 complete games, and 382 innings pitched led the AL.

"It was difficult for a batter to get [McGinnity's] measure. Sometimes his fingers would almost scrape the ground as he hurled the ball. He knew all the tricks for putting a batter on the spot.

— Connie Mack

McGinnity began the 1902 season with the Orioles. However, the franchise began to fall into significant debt. Joe Kelley, star player for the Orioles and son-in-law of part-owner John Mahon, reported that the team owed as much as $12,000 ($446,538 in current dollar terms). Unable to afford that debt, Mahon purchased shares of the team from Kelley and player-manager John McGraw. With this, Mahon became the majority shareholder. On July 17, 1902, Mahon sold his interest in the Orioles to Andrew Freedman, principal owner of the Giants, and John T. Brush, principal owner of the Cincinnati Reds, also of the NL. That day, Freedman and Brush released McGinnity, McGraw, Kelley, Roger Bresnahan, Jack Cronin, Cy Seymour, and Dan McGann from their Oriole contracts.

=== New York Giants (1902–1908) ===
Brush then signed Kelley and Seymour to the Reds, while Freedman signed McGinnity, Bresnahan, Cronin, and McGann, joining McGraw, his new player-manager, on the Giants. McGinnity attempted to contact Johnson that night, offering to stay with the Orioles if he could receive Johnson's personal assurance that he was welcome to stay. McGinnity did not hear back from Johnson, who had left his phone off the hook that night to avoid being contacted, and joined his teammates with the Giants.

With the Giants for the 1903 season, McGinnity won 31 games. He also set MLB records with 48 games started and 434 innings pitched, which remain NL records today. Jack Chesbro, pitching for the New York Highlanders of the American League during the 1904 season, set the current MLB records with 55 games started and 454 2/3 innings. In 1903, McGinnity started both games of a doubleheader on numerous occasions. He performed this feat three times in a single month, winning all six games. On the final instance, The New York Times reported "he seemed fresh enough to tackle the visitors for a third contest if that were necessary". He pitched over 100 innings in the month of August. Wins by McGinnity and fellow pitcher Christy Mathewson accounted for 73% of the Giants' winning games in 1903, setting an MLB record for a pitching tandem. After the season, McGinnity and some of his teammates threatened to quit the Giants, accusing Brush, now the Giants owner, of going back on a promise to pay the team a monetary bonus for having finished among the top three teams in the NL, as well as a share of the gate receipts from exhibition games, for which they were paid $56.35 ($2,019 in current dollar terms), though Brush allegedly had made over $200,000 ($7,166,667 in current dollar terms). McGinnity claimed that he would pitch in the California League, as he had received a salary offer for "$1,000 ($35,833 in current dollar terms) more than [he] got in New York". Jack Warner eventually joined McGinnity in publicly threatening to quit.

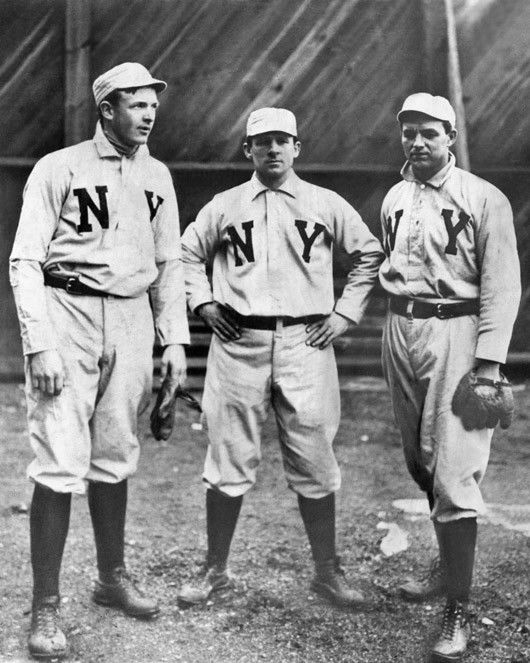
Christy Mathewson, John McGraw, and Joe McGinnity (right) in 1905

McGinnity set an MLB record during the 1904 season, recording his tenth win in 21 team games on May 21, the fewest team games for a pitcher to reach the mark. In 1904, McGinnity had a 35–8 record, leading the NL in games (51), innings pitched (408), shutouts (9), saves (5), and his career-best 1.61 ERA. With the Giants competing for the pennant, McGinnity again won both games in a doubleheader three times in a matter of weeks. Aided by McGinnity, the Giants won the NL pennant. However, they did not compete in the 1904 World Series as Brush and McGraw refused to face the AL champion Boston Pilgrims, following their altercations with Johnson. After the 1904 season, McGinnity attempted to hold out from the Giants when Brush refused to allow McGinnity to play winter baseball with a team in the Southern United States.

McGinnity won 21 games in the 1905 season, as the Giants won the NL pennant again. This year, the Giants participated in the 1905 World Series, against the AL champion Philadelphia Athletics. McGinnity started Games Two and Four of the five game series against the Athletics, winning one and losing one, while Mathewson pitched and won the other three. All five games, including the game McGinnity lost to Chief Bender, were shutouts. In 1906, McGinnity again led the NL in wins, with 27. This came in spite of a suspension McGinnity served for fighting Pirates catcher Heinie Peitz, which NL president Harry Pulliam described as "attempting to make the ball park a slaughterhouse." The Mayor of Pittsburgh, who attended the game, insisted that McGinnity be arrested.

In the 1907 season, McGinnity finished with an 18–18 record with a 3.16 ERA, allowing more than a hit per inning for the first time since the 1901 season. He missed the beginning of the 1908 season with a severe fever. In June 1908, Brush put McGinnity on waivers, hoping another owner would relieve him of McGinnity's $5,000 salary ($179,167 in current dollar terms). He tried to waive McGinnity again in August, but both times McGinnity went unclaimed. Despite this, McGinnity reverted to his old form: from August 22 through the end of the season, he had three wins and two saves as the Giants battled the Chicago Cubs for the NL pennant, falling one game short as the Cubs beat them in a one-game playoff on the final day of the season. Overall, McGinnity had an 11–7 record, five shutouts, a 2.27 ERA, and an NL-leading five saves. The Giants released McGinnity on February 27, 1909, when McGinnity decided to pay for his own release.

=== Later career ===
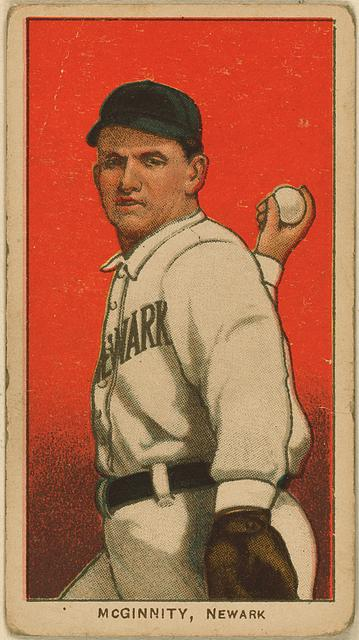
McGinnity's 1909 American Tobacco Company baseball card

McGinnity purchased the Newark Indians of the Class-A Eastern League (EL) for $50,000 ($1,791,667 in current dollar terms) in 1909 from Frank J. Farrell. The press reported that McGinnity would operate the team as a farm team of the Giants, though he denied these reports. When McGinnity could not retain manager Harry Wolverton, he stepped in as player-manager for the Indians. That season, he had a 29–16 record. His 422 innings pitched and 11 shutouts set EL single-season records. He also won both games of doubleheaders on August 27, 1909, and July 23, 1912.

McGinnity played for and managed the Indians through 1912. The Indians finished second in the EL in 1909 and 1910. McGinnity sold his interests in the Indians to Ebbets and Ed McKeever and purchased the Tacoma Tigers of the Class-B Northwestern League for $8,500 ($283,578 in current dollar terms), spending another $50,000 ($1,668,103 in current dollar terms) on the franchise in renovating the stadium. He served as player-manager of the Tigers at the start of the 1913 season, but stepped down as manager, hiring Russ Hall to serve as manager in June. McGinnity sold stock in the team in 1915 in order to afford operating expenses. He also briefly played for the Venice Tigers of the Class-A Pacific Coast League in 1914.

McGinnity sold the Tigers and purchased the Butte Miners of the Northwestern League in 1916, serving as player-manager and bringing with him several players from Tacoma. In June 1917, he sold his stock in the team and secured his release. He played for the Great Falls Electrics of the Northwestern League for the remainder of the 1917 season. He later became the manager of the A. E. Staley factory baseball team.

McGinnity served as player-manager of the Danville Veterans of the Class-B Illinois–Indiana–Iowa League in the 1922 season and Dubuque Climbers of the Class-D Mississippi Valley League during the 1923 season. With Dubuque, McGinnity won 15 games at age 52. One of those wins was a shutout, pitched in a record one hour and seven minutes. Two years later, he returned to play for Dubuque and the Springfield Senators of the Illinois–Indiana–Iowa League during the 1925 season. He pitched in his final professional game on July 28, 1925, after participating in an old-timers game earlier in the day.

McGinnity joined the coaching staff of former teammate Wilbert Robinson, along with Kelley, for the Brooklyn Dodgers during the 1926 MLB season. McGinnity and Kelley were not retained after the season.

== Personal life ==
McGinnity acquired his nickname, "Iron Man", before his doubleheader pitching became widely discussed. According to Lee Allen in The National League Story (1961), a reporter asked McGinnity, while he was still a minor league pitcher, what he did in between seasons. "I'm an iron man", he answered. "I work in a foundry." McGinnity's wife's family operated an iron foundry in McAlester, Oklahoma, where McGinnity worked in the offseasons.

Because of his nickname and connection to the foundry, John McGraw named McGinnity the starter for the Giants' March 23, 1904, exhibition game against the Southern Association's Birmingham Iron Men which was scheduled to raise funds for the Vulcan statue then being cast for the Louisiana Purchase Exposition that summer in St. Louis, Missouri. At his own request, McGinnity was allowed to visit the downtown foundry and personally pour some of the iron into the moulds for the statue.

While working with Williams College's baseball team in 1929, McGinnity became ill. He had surgery to remove tumors from his bladder, and was said to be in critical condition. After the surgery, he was quoted as saying "it's the ninth inning, and I guess they're going to get me out." He died November 14, 1929, in Brooklyn, New York, at the home of his daughter. He was interred in McAlester.

== Legacy ==
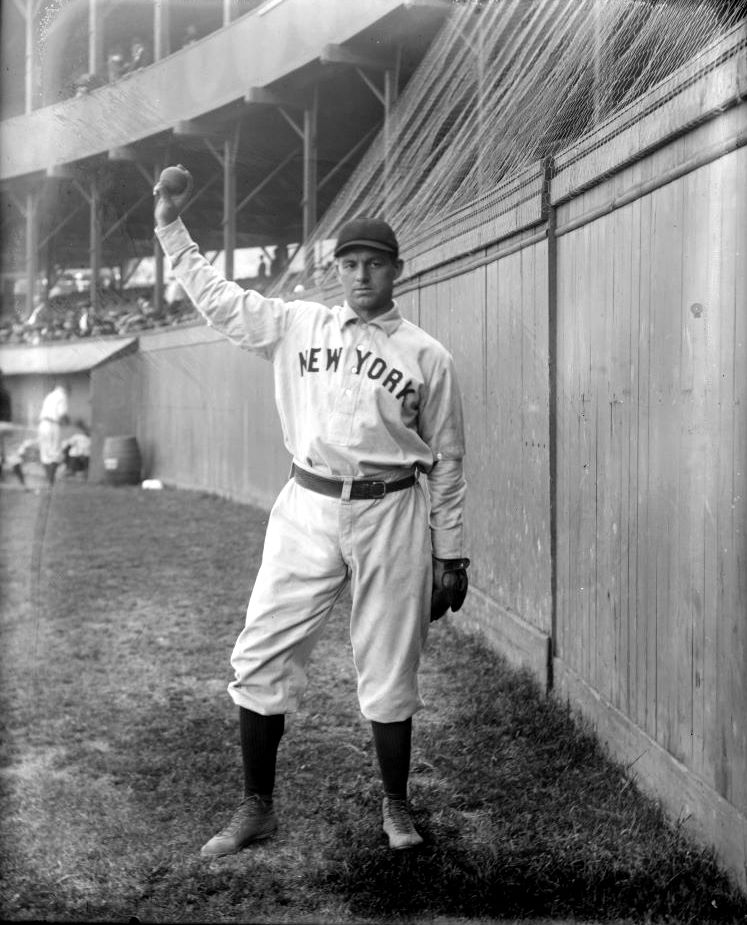
McGinnity with the New York Giants in 1904

McGinnity finished his MLB career with 246 career wins, seven 20-win seasons, and two 30-win seasons. He had nearly 500 professional wins including his years in the minor leagues. McGinnity set a career record in batters hit by pitch with 152. He revolutionized the fielding of the pitching position, by attempting to make force outs at any base, instead of throwing the ball only to first base.

After his death, McGinnity was eulogized as a "hard player" and "a fighter with brains" who hated to lose. Jennings described him as an even better fielder than he was a pitcher. McGraw said that McGinnity was "the hardest working pitcher I ever had on my ballcub". Connie Mack called him a "magician".

After failing to receive the necessary votes from the Baseball Writers' Association of America for entry in the National Baseball Hall of Fame on seven occasions, McGinnity was posthumously elected to the Hall of Fame by the Veterans Committee in 1946. He was also inducted into the Quad City Sports Hall of Fame in 1988.

Lawrence Ritter and Donald Honig included McGinnity in their 1981 book, The 100 Greatest Baseball Players of All Time. The Chicago Tribune included McGinnity in its all-time Illinois team in 1990. In his 2001 book The New Bill James Historical Baseball Abstract, Bill James ranked McGinnity as the 41st greatest pitcher of all time.

== See also ==
- List of Major League Baseball career wins leaders
- List of Major League Baseball career ERA leaders
- List of Major League Baseball career hit batsmen leaders
- List of Major League Baseball annual wins leaders
- List of Major League Baseball annual ERA leaders
- List of Major League Baseball annual shutout leaders
- List of Major League Baseball annual saves leaders

Achievements
Preceded by Kid Nichols	All-Time Saves Leader; 1907–1909	Succeeded by Mordecai Brown
