= Bill Karns =

American baseball player (1875-1941)

- Pitcher
- Born: December 28, 1875; Richmond, Iowa, U.S.
- Died: November 15, 1941 (aged 65); Seattle, Washington, U.S.
- Batted: Left Threw: Left

MLB debut
- August 1, 1901, for the Baltimore Orioles

Last MLB appearance
- September 26, 1901, for the Baltimore Orioles

MLB statistics
- Win–loss record: 1-0
- Earned run average: 6.35
- Strikeouts: 5
- Stats at Baseball Reference

Teams
- Baltimore Orioles (1901)

William Arthur Karns (December 28, 1875 – November 15, 1941) was an American Major League Baseball (MLB) pitcher. Karns played for the Baltimore Orioles in 1901. In 3 career games, he had a 1–0 record, with a 6.35 ERA. He batted and threw left-handed.

Karns was born in Richmond, Iowa, and died in Seattle, Washington.
