= Slats Jordan =

American baseball player

Slats Jordon
- First baseman / Outfielder
- Born: September 27, 1878; Baltimore, Maryland, U.S.
- Died: December 7, 1953 (aged 75); Catonsville, Maryland, U.S.
- Batted: Left Threw: Left

MLB debut
- September 28, 1901, for the Baltimore Orioles

Last MLB appearance
- September 27, 1902, for the Baltimore Orioles

MLB statistics
- Games played: 2
- At bats: 7
- Hits: 0
- Stats at Baseball Reference

Teams
- Baltimore Orioles (1901–1902)

Clarence Veasey (Slats) Jordan (September 27, 1878 – December 7, 1953) was an American Major League Baseball (MLB) first baseman and outfielder. Jordan played for the Baltimore Orioles in 1901 and 1902. Jordan played in one game in each season, going 0–3 in 1901, and going 0–4 in 1902. He batted and threw left-handed. He was signed as a free agent with the Orioles in 1901. In 1905, he played for the Agusta Tourists and was teammates with Ty Cobb.

== Personal ==
He was a Spanish American War veteran.

Jordan was born in Baltimore, Maryland, and died in Catonsville, Maryland.
