= Frank Foutz =

American baseball player (1877-1961)

- First baseman
- Born: April 8, 1877; Baltimore, Maryland, U.S.
- Died: December 25, 1961 (aged 84); Lima, Ohio, U.S.
- Batted: Right Threw: Right

MLB debut
- April 26, 1901, for the Baltimore Orioles

Last MLB appearance
- May 21, 1901, for the Baltimore Orioles

MLB statistics
- Batting average: .236
- Home runs: 2
- Runs batted in: 14
- Stats at Baseball Reference

Teams
- Baltimore Orioles (1901)

Frank Hayes Foutz (April 8, 1877 – December 25, 1961) was an American Major League Baseball first baseman. He was born on April 8, 1877, in Baltimore, Maryland. He was the brother of Dave Foutz. He played 1 season in the Major League Baseball, with the Baltimore Orioles in 1901. Foutz played in 20 games, recording 17 hits in 72 at bats (.236 batting average). Frank died on December 25, 1961, in Lima, Ohio.
