= John McGraw =

American baseball player and manager (1873–1934)

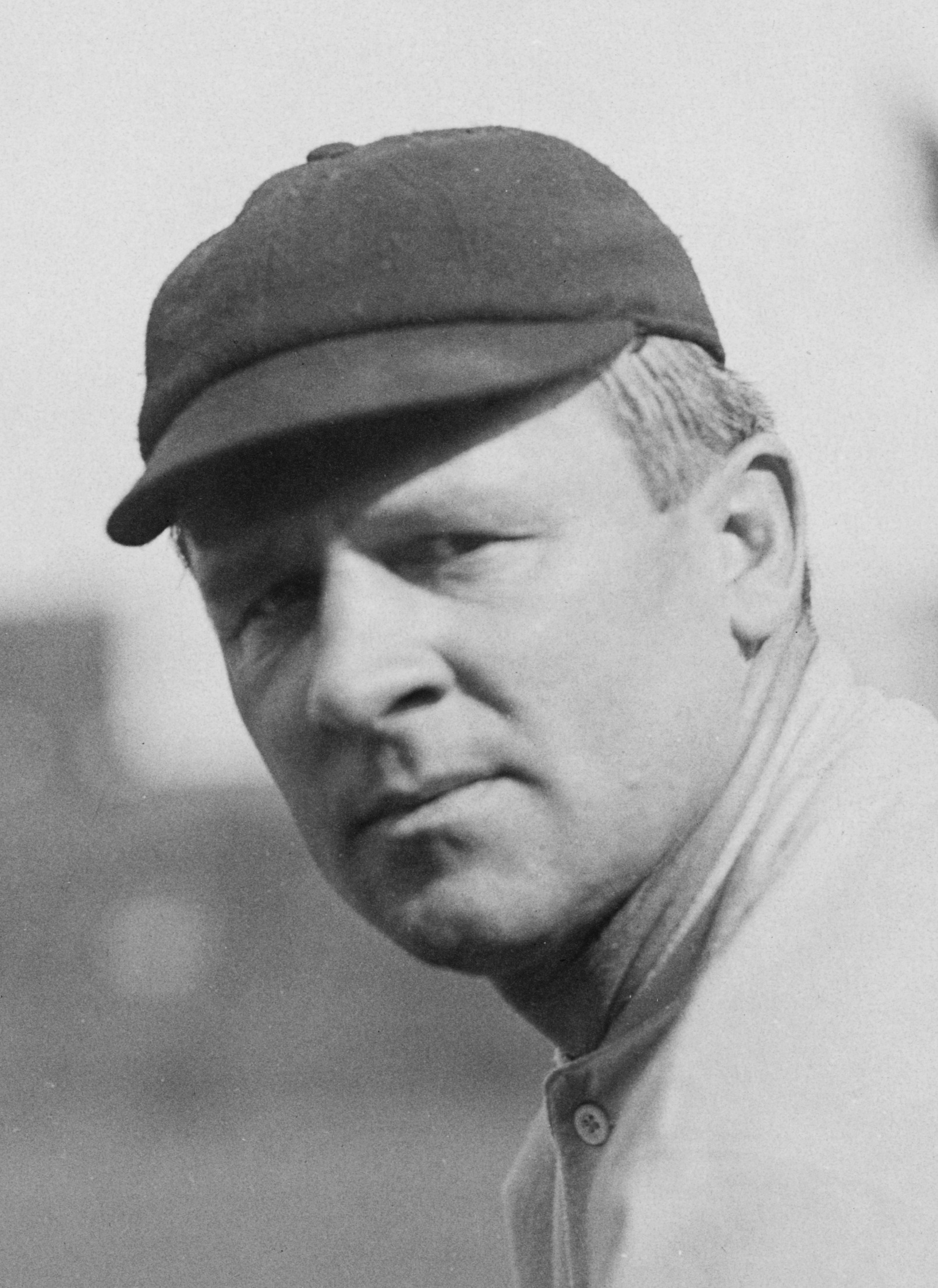
- McGraw in 1910
- Third baseman / Manager
- Born: April 7, 1873; Truxton, New York, U.S.
- Died: February 25, 1934 (aged 60); New Rochelle, New York, U.S.
- Batted: Left Threw: Right

MLB debut
- August 26, 1891, for the Baltimore Orioles

Last MLB appearance
- September 12, 1906, for the New York Giants

MLB statistics
- Batting average: .334
- Home runs: 13
- Runs batted in: 462
- Stolen bases: 436
- Games managed: 4,769
- Managerial record: 2,763–1,948–58
- Winning %: .586
- Stats at Baseball Reference
- Managerial record at Baseball Reference

Teams
- As player: Baltimore Orioles (AA/NL) (1891–1899); St. Louis Cardinals (1900); Baltimore Orioles (1901–1902); New York Giants (1902–1906); As manager: Baltimore Orioles (NL) (1899); Baltimore Orioles (1901–1902); New York Giants (1902–1932)

Career highlights and awards
- 3× World Series champion (1905, 1921, 1922); Name honored by the Giants

Member of the National

Baseball Hall of Fame
- Induction: 1937
- Election method: Centennial Commission

John Joseph McGraw (April 7, 1873 – February 25, 1934) was an American Major League Baseball (MLB) player and manager who was for almost thirty years manager of the New York Giants. He was also the third baseman of the pennant-winning 1890s Baltimore Orioles teams, noted for their innovative, aggressive play.

McGraw was born into poverty in Truxton, New York. He found an escape from his hometown and a bad family situation through baseball, beginning a quick rise through the minor leagues that led him to the Orioles at the age of 18. Under the tutelage of manager Ned Hanlon, the Orioles of the 1890s won three National League (NL) pennants; McGraw was one of the stalwarts of the team alongside Wee Willie Keeler, Hughie Jennings, and Wilbert Robinson. The Orioles perfected the hit and run play and popularized the Baltimore chop; they also sought to win by intimidating the opposing team and the umpire.

The instability in MLB at the turn of the 20th century led to McGraw becoming manager of the Orioles at age 26 in 1899, and he was lauded for his leadership. The National League Orioles were dissolved after 1899, and McGraw spent one season with the St. Louis Cardinals before returning to Baltimore as player/manager of the new Orioles of the American League (AL). He quarreled with AL president Ban Johnson and jumped to the Giants in 1902, taking several Orioles players with him.

Through his just-short of thirty years managing the Giants, McGraw exerted control on players and team, and saw great success, winning ten pennants (matched only by Casey Stengel, who played for and learned from him) and three World Series. His 2,763 victories as an MLB manager ranks third overall behind only Connie Mack and Tony La Russa; he holds the NL record with 31 seasons managed. Additionally, McGraw finished his managerial career 815 games over .500, more than any other manager in MLB history. This is 23 games more than Joe McCarthy, who is second with 792 games over .500. McGraw is widely held to be one of the greatest managers in baseball history. He retired, ill, in 1932 and died less than two years later after making a final appearance in 1933 as NL manager in the first All-Star Game.

== Early life ==
McGraw's father (also named John) emigrated from Ireland in 1856. He arrived before the Civil War, and served in the Union Army. He married, but his first wife soon died, leaving him with a young daughter, and he moved to Truxton, New York, in 1871, where he became a railroad worker. There, he married young Ellen Comerfort. The younger John McGraw, her first child, was born in Truxton on April 7, 1873.

The family was poor, with eight children, and there was no public assistance available. Young John had a love of baseball from an early age. By doing odd jobs, he was able to save a dollar and send off for one of the Spalding company's cheaper baseballs, which he used to practice his pitching.

Tragedy struck the family in the winter of 1885, when there was a diphtheria epidemic in the area. The disease killed Ellen McGraw and four of the McGraw children, including John's older half-sister. John Sr. never fully recovered from the trauma of the deaths. Father and son argued over the time young John spent on baseball, especially since the father had to pay for windows the son broke while playing. Later in 1885, after young John broke another window, the father became abusive, and the son ran away to a neighbor, Mary Goddard, who ran the local hotel. She persuaded John Sr. to let his son stay in her care.

During his time in Goddard's household, John attended school and took on several jobs that allowed him to save money to buy baseballs and the Spalding magazines that documented the rule changes in the rival major leagues of baseball, the National League and the American Association. He quickly became the best player on his school team.

While in Goddard's care, he took a job delivering newspapers. As a paperboy, he met and struck up a friendship with Herman Pitz, who was then playing minor league baseball in Elmira. McGraw began carrying Pitz's bags and was adopted as a mascot by the Elmira team.

Shortly after his 16th birthday, he began playing for his town's team, the Truxton Grays, making a favorable impression on their manager, Albert "Bert" Kenney. While he could play any position, his ability to throw a big curveball made him the star pitcher. McGraw's relationship with Kenney precipitated his professional playing career.

== Playing career ==
=== Minor leagues ===
In 1890, Kenney bought a portion of the new professional baseball franchise in Olean, New York. The team was to play in the newly formed New York–Pennsylvania League. In return for this investment, he was named Olean's player/manager, responsible for selecting and signing players. When approached by McGraw, Kenney doubted the boy's curveball would fool professional ballplayers. Persuaded by the assurance McGraw could play any position, Kenney signed him to a contract on April 1, 1890. McGraw would never return to live in Truxton, the place of his birth.

Olean was 200 miles (320 km) from Truxton, and this was the farthest the youngster had ever traveled from his hometown. He began the season on the bench. After two days, Kenney inserted him into the starting lineup at third base. McGraw later described his first professional game:

[F]or the life of me, I could not run to get it. It seemed like an age before I could get the ball in my hands and then, as I looked over to first, it seemed like the longest throw I ever had to make. The first baseman was the tallest in the league, but I threw the ball far over his head.

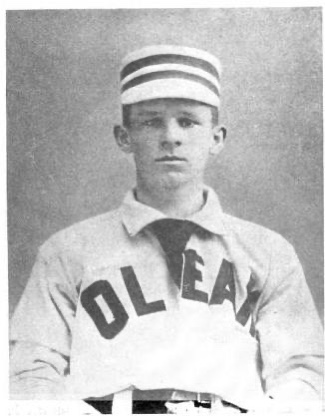
McGraw while playing for Olean, 1890

Seven more errors in nine more chances followed that day. Both the team and McGraw remained ineffective, and he was fired by Kenney after six games, though the captain gave him $70, equivalent to $2,508 in 2025, and wished him luck. He signed with a team in Wellsville, New York, who played in the Western New York League. The level of baseball played there was the lowest of the minor leagues, and McGraw still struggled with his fielding. But during the 24 games he appeared in for the club, he hit with a batting average of .365, a glimpse of his later hitting prowess.

After that first season, McGraw caught on with the offseason team of promoter Alfred Lawson. McGraw joined the team in Ocala, Florida, and the team sailed from Tampa to Havana, Cuba, where they played the local teams in what was then a Spanish colony. McGraw, who played shortstop, became a favorite of local fans, who dubbed him "el mono amarillo" (the yellow monkey), referring to his speed, his diminutive size, and the color of his team's uniforms. McGraw fell in love with Cuba and returned there many times in later years.

Lawson took his team to Gainesville, Florida, in February 1891, and persuaded the National League Cleveland Spiders to play his team. McGraw hit three doubles in five times at bat, playing errorless ball at shortstop, and the reports of that game led several minor league teams to seek to sign him. Lawson acted as the boy's agent, and advised him to request $125 monthly and a $75 advance. The manager of the Cedar Rapids club in the Illinois–Iowa League was the first to wire the money, and McGraw signed with them. Other teams claimed that McGraw had also taken advance money from them (though McGraw maintained he returned it) and one even threatened legal action. This came to nothing, allowing McGraw to play with Cedar Rapids.

By August, the league had financial woes but McGraw was hitting .275 and had become known as a tough shortstop. Billy Barnie, manager of the American Association's Baltimore Orioles, had heard about McGraw, and wrote to the Rockford team's Bill Gleason, a former Oriole, for a recommendation, which according to McGraw biographer Charles C. Alexander must have been favorable, as Barnie then wired Hank Smith, another former Oriole who was playing for Cedar Rapids, asking if there was any chance Baltimore could acquire McGraw. Cedar Rapids agreed to give McGraw his release, and he left by rail for Baltimore. McGraw arrived at Camden Station in Baltimore on August 24, 1891, still only 18 years old, but now a major-league baseball player. McGraw described his new home upon his arrival as "a dirty, dreary, ramshackle sort of place." Barnie was unimpressed by the short stature of the player he had recruited unseen, but McGraw assured him, "I'm bigger than I look."

=== Baltimore years ===
==== 1891–1894 ====
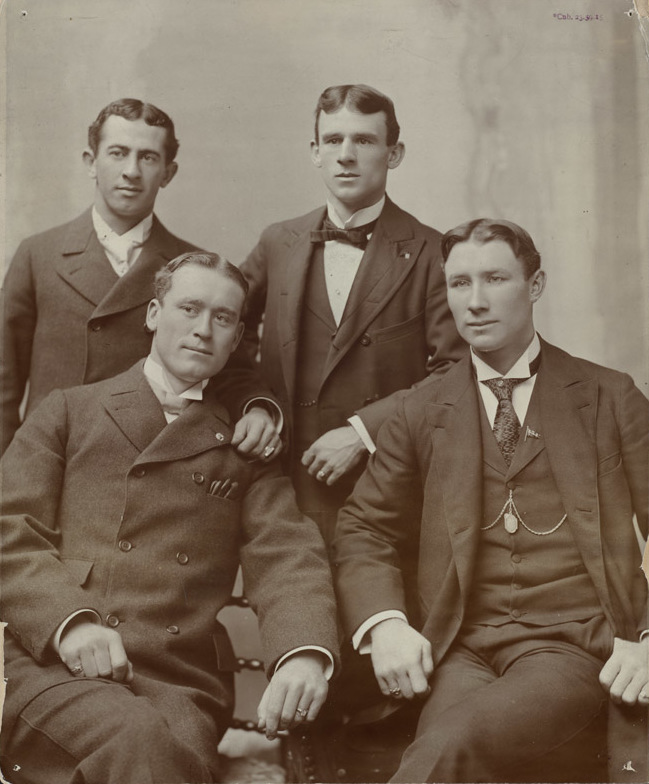
Baltimore's "Big Four": McGraw (standing, to the right), with outfielder Joe Kelley (seated left), shortstop Hughie Jennings (seated right), and Wee Willie Keeler (standing left)

During the short part of the 1891 season McGraw was with the Orioles, he hit .245. Initially he played shortstop, but his poor fielding (18 errors in 86 chances) caused Barnie, who quit before the end of the season, to try him at other positions. Despite his poor fielding percentage, McGraw was quickly signed to a contract for 1892 by club owner Harry Von der Horst. The American Association failed after the 1891 season, and the Orioles and other surviving franchises moved to an expanded twelve-team National League.

Early in the 1892 season, Von der Horst hired outfielder Ned Hanlon of the Pittsburgh Pirates to manage the Orioles. The Orioles lost over 100 games, finishing last by a wide margin. Of the seventeen players Hanlon inherited, he kept only three: pitcher Sadie McMahon, catcher Wilbert Robinson and McGraw. According to baseball author Burt Solomon, "Hanlon saw that McGraw's value to the Orioles came less from his agility than from his intensity. He never gave up and had contempt for anyone who did, John McGraw could drive his teammates to another level of play." But little of that showed in the 1892 season, in which McGraw hit .267 with 14 stolen bases while playing a variety of positions. During the 1892–93 offseason, McGraw attended Allegany College (soon to be renamed St. Bonaventure), trading his skills as a baseball coach for the right to attend without paying tuition.

In 1893, Hanlon secured Hughie Jennings from the Louisville Colonels, a shortstop whose acquisition caused Hanlon to displace McGraw from that position. The team finished eighth in 1893, while McGraw hit .327, second on the club to Robinson, and led the league in runs scored. He spent a second winter at St. Bonaventure, this time with Robinson as his assistant coach and fellow student. During the offseason, McGraw narrowly avoided being dealt to the woeful Washington Senators when a trade for Duke Farrell fell through. Deciding McGraw could handle third base, Hanlon traded two infielders for five-time batting champion Dan Brouthers and diminutive outfielder Willie Keeler.

By 1894, McGraw was settled in at third base. Under manager Ned Hanlon, an unerring talent spotter, the Orioles won three straight pennants, making them the second-best team of the decade. Boston, which won five pennants that decade, was better, but it is the Orioles who are remembered as the team of the '90s—not just for their skill, but also for their style. Aggressive and creative, the O's either invented or perfected the hit-and-run, the Baltimore chop, the suicide squeeze, and the bunt single. They also led the league in unsportsmanlike conduct.

— Cait N. Murphy (2007). Crazy '08: How a Cast of Cranks, Rogues, Boneheads, and Magnates Created the Greatest Year in Baseball History, p. 18

The Orioles' 1894 spring training took place in Macon, Georgia, where Hanlon taught the players innovative plays that he had thought of during his playing career, and in the evening, drilled them on baseball's rules and possible ways of taking advantage of them. The innovations of the Orioles of the mid-1890s would include the Baltimore chop, hitting a pitched ball so it would bounce high and allow the batter to reach first base safely, and having the pitcher cover first base when the first baseman fielded a ball that took him away from the base, and though they probably did not invent the hit and run, they were the first team to employ it as a regular maneuver. McGraw often took the lead in the discussions. When the team played in New Orleans, a local sportswriter called him "a fine ball-player, yet he adopts every low and contemptible method that his erratic brain can conceive to win a play by a dirty trick". This included shoving, holding, and blocking baserunners, at a time when there was often only a single umpire. One baserunner, anticipating that McGraw would hold him by the belt, loosened it and when he broke for home, McGraw was left holding the belt in his hand as the runner scored.

McGraw usually batted leadoff for the 1894 Orioles, batting .340 and stealing 78 bases, second in the league. He would foul off pitch after pitch—a valuable talent in the pre-1901 era in which foul balls generally did not count as strikes—and, with Keeler, "elevated into an art form" the hit and run. Many of the players, including McGraw, lived in the same Baltimore boarding house, and talked baseball deep into the night. From such discussions arose the discovery that a runner on third had an excellent chance of scoring if he left at the pitcher's first motion and the batter bunted, originating the squeeze play. A reputation for dirty play led to McGraw being dubbed "Muggsy", a nickname he strongly disliked, by The Washington Post. The Orioles won their first pennant, besting the New York Giants and the Boston Beaneaters. Amid disputes over money, they lost the postseason Temple Cup series to the second-place Giants. After a brief visit to Truxton, McGraw spent the winter at St. Bonaventure.

==== 1895–1899 ====
The Orioles' "Big Four" (McGraw, Jennings, Keeler and Joe Kelley) held out to start 1895, but came to terms with the club in time for spring training. By 1895, McGraw had become controversial for his aggressive style of play. Some writers urged Hanlon to rein him in, but others argued that fans were flocking to the ballpark to see such play. In spite of the controversy, the Orioles won their second consecutive pennant, though they lost the Temple Cup again, this time to the Spiders. McGraw, suffering from malaria, missed part of the season, but hit .369 in 96 games, with 61 stolen bases and 110 runs scored. McGraw again went to St. Bonaventure, returning to Baltimore when the fall term ended in mid-December.

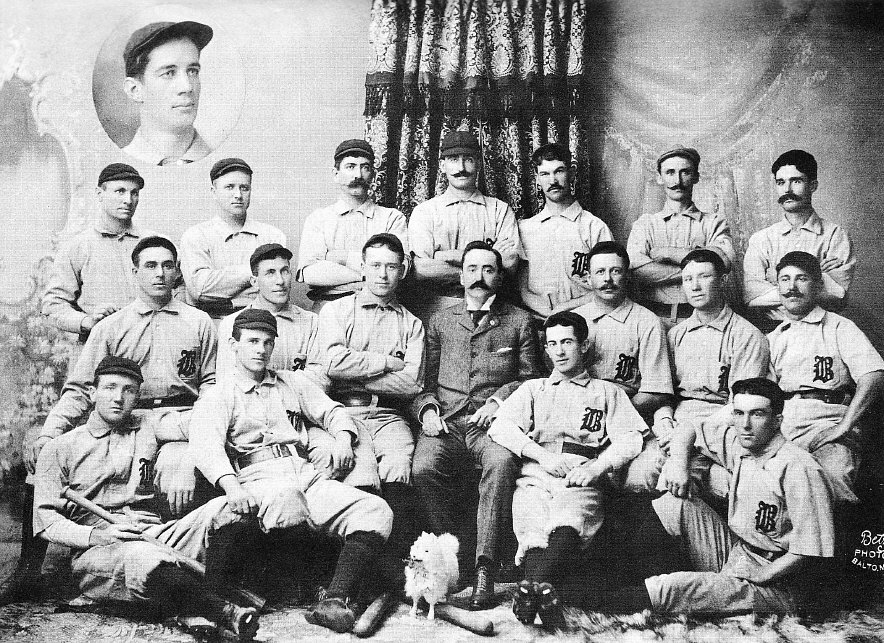
McGraw (2nd from left, front row) with the 1896 Baltimore Orioles

During 1896 spring training, McGraw fell ill with typhoid fever in Atlanta. By the time he had convalesced, in late August, the Orioles had nearly secured their third straight pennant, this time winning the Temple Cup over the Spiders in four games. McGraw appeared in only 23 games for Baltimore, batting .325. After the season, the Orioles had planned an exhibition tour of Europe, but it was canceled over concerns poor weather would preclude too many games. The Big Four went anyway, as tourists, visiting Britain, Belgium and France. Following their return, in February 1897, McGraw married Minnie Doyle, whose father was a city official. McGraw and the Orioles both had seasons that disappointed them in 1897, McGraw hitting .325, and the team plagued by injuries as Baltimore lost the pennant to the Beaneaters, though the Orioles won the final iteration of the Temple Cup. In 1898, McGraw hit .342, but the Orioles finished second again, six games behind the Beaneaters.

The Orioles' success on the field had not translated to increased attendance, which fell substantially as the Orioles won pennants, as violence on the field spread into the stands. The Spanish–American War of 1898 distracted the public from baseball, causing financial problems for the teams. Before the 1899 season, Van der Horst and Hanlon (a co-owner) bought half the shares in the Dodgers, while Brooklyn owners, led by Charlie Ebbets, bought a 50 percent interest in the Orioles. Brooklyn drew better attendance than Baltimore, and under the arrangement, known as "syndicate baseball", manager Hanlon and the better Oriole players would move to Brooklyn. McGraw and Robinson, who had financial interests in Baltimore, refused to go and before the 1899 season, McGraw was made player/manager of the Orioles.

McGraw schooled his players in the Orioles system, and led by example, hitting .391 for the season. To Hanlon's surprise, attendance in Baltimore rebounded, and the Orioles remained close to Brooklyn in the pennant race through late August, when McGraw had to leave the team due to the illness of his wife. By the time he returned, after her death, Brooklyn had clinched the pennant; the Orioles finished fourth. Nevertheless, for getting the castoff Orioles to perform so well amid his personal tragedy, McGraw was hailed as a managerial genius in the newspapers.

=== St. Louis and American League Orioles ===
Syndicate baseball was insufficient to revive the finances of the National League, and before the 1900 season, four NL teams (including Baltimore) were ended. McGraw and Robinson were sold to the St. Louis Cardinals. They did not report until the season had begun, having secured increases in salary and a concession that their contracts would not contain the then-standard reserve clause that bound them to the signing team for the following season. Thus, they would be free agents after the 1900 season. Injured for part of the season, McGraw hit .337 in 98 games as the Cardinals finished tied for fifth, but when manager Patsy Tebeau resigned in August, McGraw ruled out replacing him.

Ban Johnson, president of the minor league Western League, sought to build a second major league, which would seek to attract fans wanting baseball without rowdyism or aggression towards umpires. McGraw and Robinson, centerpieces of the old Orioles where such aggression was routine, were an odd fit, but as Johnson renamed his circuit the American League (AL) and sought to put franchises in abandoned NL cities like Baltimore, they became key to his plans. He was confident he could control them, since one of the requirements was that franchises grant the league an option to buy a majority stake and thus take them over if necessary.

Even while under contract to the Cardinals, McGraw and Robinson were involved in meetings aimed at upgrading the Western League to major league status, and on November 12, 1900, they signed an agreement with Johnson giving them exclusive rights to form an AL franchise in Baltimore, securing financial backing from local figures. McGraw spent much of the winter seeking to sign players. Among them was Charley Grant, an African-American second baseman who McGraw alleged was a Native American, but Charles Comiskey, owner of the AL Chicago White Sox, was undeceived, thus ending McGraw's only attempt to break the baseball color line—McGraw, like many of the time who grew up in the rural North, had no strong views about African Americans. Thereafter, McGraw kept a file on talented African-American ballplayers, seeking to be prepared if the major leagues integrated, which did not happen in his lifetime.

McGraw batted leadoff and managed the Orioles as Major League Baseball made its return to Baltimore in 1901, but missed games due to injuries and because of a suspension by Johnson for abusing the umpire. The Orioles finished fifth, McGraw batting .349 in 73 games. The team lost money. On January 8, 1902, McGraw married for the second time, to Blanche Sindall, whose father was a Baltimore housing contractor.

=== Statistics ===
Year	Age	Team	Lg	GP	AB	R	H	2B	3B	HR	RBI	SB	SO	BA	OBP	SLG	OPS
1891	18	Baltimore Orioles	AA	33	115	17	31	3	5	0	14	4	17	.270	.359	.383	.741
1892	19	Baltimore Orioles	NL	79	286	41	77	13	2	1	26	15	21	.269	.355	.339	.694
1893	20	Baltimore Orioles	NL	127	480	123	154	9	10	5	64	38	11	.321	.454	.413	.866
1894	21	Baltimore Orioles	NL	124	512	156	174	18	14	1	92	78	12	.340	.451	.436	.887
1895	22	Baltimore Orioles	NL	96	388	110	143	13	6	2	48	61	9	.369	.459	.448	.908
1896	23	Baltimore Orioles	NL	23	77	20	25	2	2	0	14	13	4	.325	.422	.403	.825
1897	24	Baltimore Orioles	NL	106	391	90	127	15	3	0	48	44	15	.325	.471	.379	.849
1898	25	Baltimore Orioles	NL	143	515	143	176	8	10	0	53	43	13	.342	.475	.396	.871
1899	26	Baltimore Orioles	NL	117	399	140	156	13	3	1	33	73	21	.391	.547	.446	.994
1900	27	St. Louis Cardinals	NL	99	334	84	115	10	4	2	33	29	9	.344	.505	.416	.921
1901	28	Baltimore Orioles	AL	73	232	71	81	14	9	0	28	24	6	.349	.508	.487	.995
1902	29	Baltimore Orioles/New York Giants	AL/NL	55	170	27	43	3	2	1	8	12	17	.253	.420	.312	.732
1903	30	New York Giants	NL	12	11	2	3	0	0	0	1	1	0	.273	.467	.273	.739
1904	31	New York Giants	NL	5	12	0	4	0	0	0	0	0	0	.333	.467	.333	.800
1905	32	New York Giants	NL	3	0	0	0	0	0	0	0	1	0				
1906	33	New York Giants	NL	4	2	0	0	0	0	0	0	0	0	.000	.333	.000	.333

== Manager of the New York Giants (1902–1932) ==
=== Hiring ===
McGraw started the 1902 season with a knee injury; recovery from that, suspensions and a deep cut from the sharpened spikes of a baserunner meant he played few games for the Orioles. The team drifted between fifth and seventh in the league, and there was widespread talk that at the end of the season, Johnson would shift the team to New York. Although being a manager and part owner of a New York AL team would be a major opportunity for him, McGraw was convinced Johnson planned to discard him in the process. According to Solomon, "so McGraw struck first. Any true Oriole would."

On June 18, 1902, with the Orioles on a western road trip with Robinson as acting manager, McGraw (who was recuperating from the spiking) traveled to New York and met with Andrew Freedman, owner of the Giants. The two came up with a scheme not only for McGraw to switch leagues but to cripple the Orioles and possibly the AL. When McGraw returned to the lineup on June 28, he provoked the umpire into kicking him out of the game and, when he refused to go, forfeiting the game to Boston. This resulted in his indefinite suspension by Johnson.

McGraw went to the directors of the Baltimore franchise, and demanded that either they reimburse the $7,000 he had advanced towards player salaries or that they release him. The team agreed to his release on July 8, and McGraw sold his interest in the club to John Mahon, a team official and Joe Kelley's father in law. McGraw immediately announced he would sign to manage the Giants, which he did the next day. His salary of $11,000, equivalent to $409,327 in 2025, was the largest of any player or manager in baseball history to that point.

Freedman then secured a controlling interest in the Orioles from Mahon, Kelley and others. Once he had done so, he directed the release of Orioles Joe McGinnity, Dan McGann, Roger Bresnahan and Jack Cronin, all of whom promptly signed with the Giants. Cincinnati Reds owner John T. Brush, who was also a minority owner of the Giants, was in on the deal; he signed Kelley as manager of the Reds and also outfielder Cy Seymour, both released by the Orioles. Baltimore was left with so few players it had to forfeit its next game; the crisis might have destroyed the American League had not Johnson acted decisively to take over the Baltimore franchise, getting the other seven teams to contribute players to the Orioles, who finished last. After the season, the two leagues signed a peace agreement, and the AL replaced the Baltimore franchise with one in New York City. That team became known as the Highlanders and later as the New York Yankees.

According to Alexander, given a crisis in his professional life as Johnson sought to exclude him from the Orioles' move to New York, McGraw acted in a way that was "totally ruthless and unscrupulous". Baseball historian Fred Lieb, who knew both men well, wrote that McGraw and Johnson never spoke again.

=== 1902–1904 ===
There is a story McGraw fired me the first day. That is a big lie. It was the second day. I hid in the clubhouse the first day.

— Jack Hendricks, a Giants outfielder until shortly after McGraw became manager

By the time the Giants returned from a road trip to meet McGraw at their home field, the Polo Grounds, they had a record of 22–50 (Note: 22 wins and 50 losses) and were in last place in the NL. Not all of them got to return. McGraw released four of them by telegraph to Cincinnati, and two more when they returned to New York. McGraw played occasionally, and spent part of the season appearing in AL cities seeking to sign players, much to the discomfiture of the local team's management. The Giants finished last, and at the end of the season, Freedman sold the team to Brush (who had sold his interest in the Reds). With his knee injury robbing him of much of his skill, McGraw batted .286 in 20 games with Baltimore and .234 in 35 games with the Giants. It would be his last season as a full-time player, though he nominally remained on the roster until 1906. One stratagem used by McGraw was to have pitcher Dummy Taylor, who was deaf and could not speak, teach his teammates sign language, which both gave the team ways of communicating on the field and improved Taylor's relationship with his teammates. The Giants used sign language until Chicago's Johnny Evers detected and learned it.

McGraw's knee gave way in 1903 spring training, effectively sidelining him for the season; he was also injured early in the year by a ball thrown by Taylor that broke McGraw's nose. The cartilage did not heal properly, contributing to respiratory problems that plagued McGraw for the rest of his life. During spring training, McGraw took pains to cultivate the team's star, pitcher Christy Mathewson, and the two men (with their wives, Blanche McGraw and Jane Mathewson) became so close that they shared an apartment in New York City. McGraw also forged a strong relationship with the new Giants owner, Brush, according to baseball author Cait N. Murphy, "the partnership clicked: Brush signed the checks and did as McGraw ordered".

McGraw's new-look Giants got off to a hot start in 1903, and were in first place ahead of the two-time defending NL champion Pirates at the end of May, as crowds not seen in a decade flocked to the Polo Grounds. Still coming together as a team, they thereafter faded and finished second, 6 1/2 games behind the Pirates, but McGinnity won 31 games while Mathewson won 30 and led the league in strikeouts. As a player, McGraw appeared in 11 games and batted .273. The Giants' success, and the controversy the belligerent McGraw aroused, meant they attracted larger crowds not only at the Polo Grounds, but on the road as well. Leading the most hated team in the league, McGraw stated, "it is the prospect of a hot feud, that brings out the crowd."

Before the 1904 season, McGraw deemed his team the strongest he had ever led, and predicted the Giants would win the pennant. The team played accordingly, and opened up a 15-game lead on the Chicago Cubs by the start of September. With the Highlanders leading the AL for much of the year (though they ultimately were defeated by Boston), there was intense pressure on McGraw and Brush to agree to a postseason series against the AL champions, what would later come to be known as the World Series, like the Pirates had the previous year. Both men refused, McGraw stating that there was nothing in the league rules requiring its champions to play a series against "a victorious club in a minor league". According to Alexander, both men disliked Ban Johnson and feared losing the series to the AL champions, as the Pirates had in 1903. The Giants won the pennant, setting a major league record for victories (to that point) with 106.

=== 1905–1908 ===
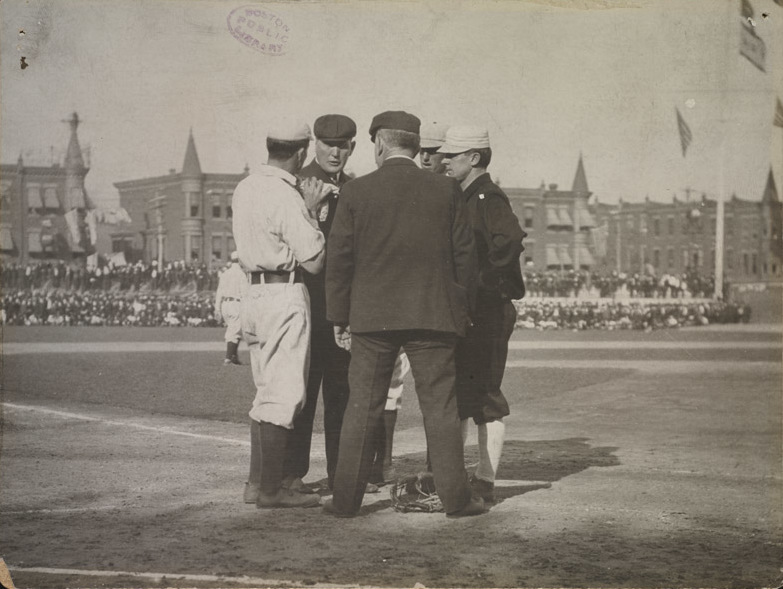
McGraw discusses an issue with an umpire and two members of the Philadelphia Athletics at Columbia Park during the 1905 World Series

McGraw continued building his team in the 1904–1905 offseason, purchasing Sammy Strang from Brooklyn. As well as playing nearly every position, Strang pioneered a McGraw innovation, the pinch hitter; part of his job was to bat for other players. He schooled them in the aggressive techniques of the old Orioles, stating years later, "It was a team of fighters. They thought they could beat anybody and they generally could." The team was never really threatened in its drive to a second consecutive pennant, and McGraw always stated this was the best team he ever managed. It won 105 games; the Pirates finished second, nine games behind. McGraw was ejected from games 13 times, a personal record, and Pittsburgh owner Barney Dreyfuss sought to have McGraw disciplined after the manager shouted accusations at him after one ejection. The league Board of Directors refused to suspend McGraw, and when NL president Harry Pulliam suspended McGraw for 15 games for accusing Pulliam of being Dreyfuss's lackey, the suspension was overturned by a court. This time, the Giants had no objection to playing a postseason series against the AL champions, the Philadelphia Athletics, managed by Connie Mack. The 1905 World Series saw a great exhibition of pitching, as every game ended in a shutout, three of them pitched by Mathewson and one by McGinnity. The Giants won, four games to one. McGraw was rewarded with a new contract at $15,000 per year. The victory made the Giants heroes in a city that always admired winners, and McGraw one of the most prominent people in New York.

Confident of a third-straight NL championship, McGraw put "World's Champions" on the front of his team's uniforms. But the drive for that was slowed by Mathewson getting diphtheria, and outfielder Mike Donlin broke a leg; The Giants finished second, twenty games behind the Cubs. McGraw played the last games of his playing career, going hitless in two plate appearances in the four games he played. His .466 career on-base percentage remains third-best all-time behind Ted Williams (.482) and Babe Ruth (.474).

McGraw made few changes for the 1907 Giants. But by mid-July, the Cubs pulled away and New York finished in fourth place, 25 1/2 games behind. McGraw later stated, "It was in 1907 that I discovered my players were growing old and beginning to slip. Always I have made it a point never to let a club grow old on me."

He was a wonderful man, a real fighter ... Anybody wanted to argue, he was ready. I got along with him fine. He only suspended me once, for two weeks. It was on account of I socked him.

— Al Bridwell, a Giant from 1908 to 1911

McGraw brought an unusual number of rookies to spring training in Marlin, Texas, to train alongside the remaining veterans such as Mathewson. Despite low expectations, in early July only a game and a half separated the Cubs, Giants and Pirates. The crucial game of the season was on September 23 against the Cubs: with the score tied in the ninth inning and two outs, Al Bridwell lined a ball cleanly into center field, scoring the apparent winning run. In a play immortalized as "Merkle's Boner", rookie Fred Merkle, on first base, did not touch second base, but headed for the clubhouse. This was not unusual at the time, but Chicago second baseman Johnny Evers recovered the ball and stepped on second base. The umpires ruled Merkle out, and the game a tie. The makeup game, to break a tie for first place, was held before a crowd of as many as 40,000, plus many more outside the Polo Grounds. The Giants lost the game and the pennant, 4–2. Despite the incident, McGraw urged Merkle to put the matter behind him, and when Merkle received his 1909 contract, he found McGraw had given him a raise of $300.

=== 1909–1914 ===
Although many of the Giants had played well in 1908—Mathewson had won 37 games, although defeated in the final game against Chicago—McGraw saw a need to rebuild the team. McGinnity was released late in 1908, as was Dummy Taylor, while Bresnahan was dealt to St. Louis, allowing him to become the Cardinals' manager. McGraw made baseball history by hiring the first full-time coach to assist him, Arlie Latham. During the 1909 season, the young players were not yet fully developed, while the older ones continued to slip. The Giants finished third, well behind the pennant-winning Pirates. In 1910, Mathewson had another standout season, but the pitching was otherwise erratic, as the Giants finished a distant second to the Cubs. That offseason, content with his maturing team, for the first time in several years, McGraw made no trades with other teams.

The Giants' 1911 season started inauspiciously when the Polo Grounds burned down the night after the team's opening day loss. The team moved temporarily to Hilltop Park, home of the Highlanders. The young and fast Giants would set a record for stolen bases with 347, which is the most for any team in a post-1900 season. The Giants languished in third as late as August but they soon grew hot and rallied to win the pennant. Some credited the Giants' success to the presence, as mascot and good-luck charm, of would-be pitcher Charles Faust, whom McGraw, who like many of his players was superstitious, allowed to sit on the bench in uniform as mascot. The Giants lost the 1911 World Series to the Athletics in six games.

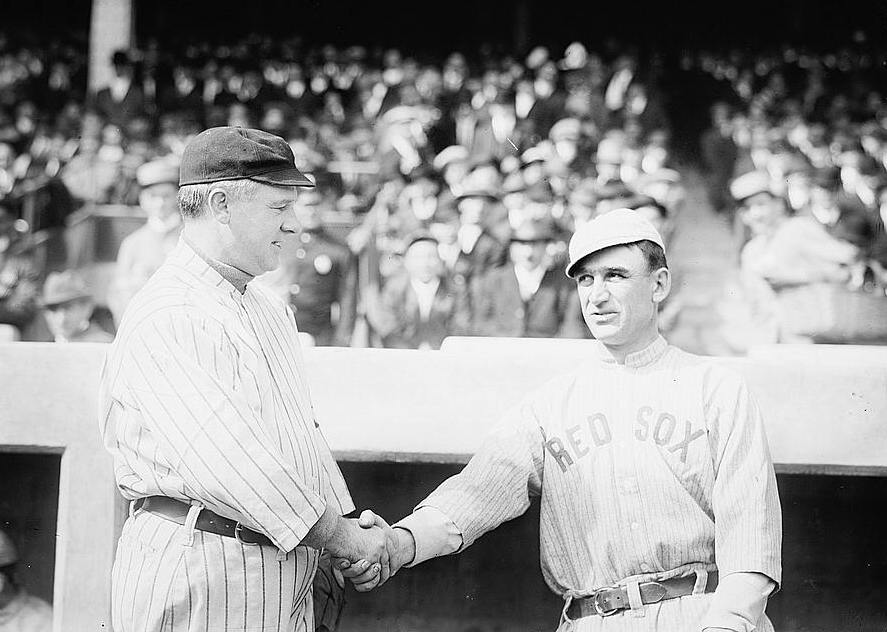
John McGraw greets fellow manager Jake Stahl at the 1912 World Series.

Although McGraw considered that Faust had expired as a good-luck charm, he allowed him to sit in the Giants' dugout in street clothes and the Giants won 54 of the first 66 games of their 1912 season, pitcher Rube Marquard winning 19 in a row (21 counting two wins in 1911). Both the team and Marquand slumped beginning in early July, the Cubs getting to within 3 1/2 games, but the Giants resurged to win their second consecutive league championship. In the 1912 World Series, the Giants were defeated by the Boston Red Sox, four games to three, with one tie. The Giants had the lead, and Mathewson on the mound, going into the bottom of the tenth inning of the decisive Game Eight, but fielding mistakes, including a notorious "muff" by Fred Snodgrass, helped defeat the Giants.

After the 1912 season, McGraw spent several months as a vaudeville performer; his pay of $3,000 a week was the highest in the industry at the time. Brush died after the season; control of the Giants passed to his heirs, including Harry Hempstead, the new team president, who gave the manager a new five-year contract for $30,000 per year. Before the 1913 season, McGraw signed Olympic decathlete Jim Thorpe to a contract. The signing was something of a stunt, but McGraw apparently hoped Thorpe's athleticism would help him develop into a competent major leaguer. Instead, Thorpe played sporadically for three different teams over six seasons.

The Giants won their third straight pennant in 1913, finishing 12 1/2 games in front of the Phillies. The Giants lost their third straight World Series, to the Athletics in five games, becoming the more recent (after the Detroit Tigers of 1907–1909) of the two teams who lost World Series in three consecutive years.

Contemporary commentators attributed the lack of success shown by McGraw's Giants in the World Series to his preference for players that fit his system rather than seeking the best players. Others suggested his players mentally froze at key moments out of fear of letting down McGraw, and Mathewson, in a column published under his name after the 1913 season, called the Giants a "team of puppets being manipulated from the bench on a string".

During the 1913–14 offseason, John McGraw and White Sox owner Comiskey led two teams of baseball players around the world. Blanche McGraw accompanied her husband on the tour. Before the 1914 season, backers of a new major league, the Federal League, sought to attract prominent players and managers, including McGraw, who reportedly was offered up to $100,000 to jump to the Federals. He did not, and the Giants led the league on the Fourth of July, with the Boston Braves in last place. The Braves then began a legendary turnaround and within six weeks were close behind the Giants. Boston defeated the Giants on Labor Day, and finished first, ahead of the Giants by 10 1/2 games. McGraw grew surly as his team collapsed, accusing players of overconfidence, and though the Giants played a postseason exhibition series against the Yankees, he did not manage them there, attending the World Series instead.

=== 1915–1919 ===
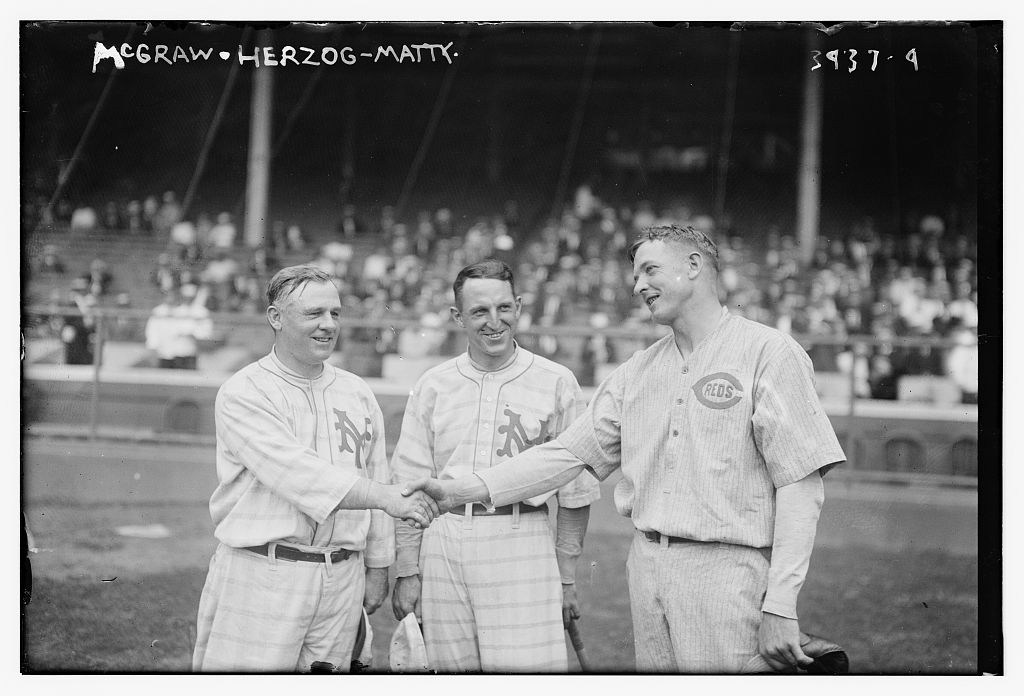
McGraw (left) with Buck Herzog and Mathewson, 1916

The Giants finished last in 1915; Mathewson won only eight games (he would win only four more after 1915), and McGraw discarded Marquand, Snodgrass and Thorpe. The 1916 Giants were a team in transition, as McGraw traded some of the last players from the 1911–1913 teams. Mathewson was sent to Cincinnati. McGraw was emotional at Mathewson's departure, and was widely praised for giving him the opportunity to start a managerial career with the Reds, but may have resented the Mathewson column following the 1913 World Series. The Giants attracted large crowds to the Polo Grounds in September by winning 26 games in a row (still an MLB record as of 2021) but finished only fourth.

Content with his team, McGraw made few changes before the 1917 season. Alexander described the 1917 Giants as "basically mediocre". By early June, the Giants were moving to a comfortable lead in the standings, one they held all season. McGraw was fined and suspended by the league for attacking umpire Bill Byron after a June 7 game in Cincinnati a suspension that was doubled when he made disparaging comments about league president John Tener. Nevertheless, the Giants won the pennant by 11 games over the Phillies. The Giants faced the White Sox in the 1917 World Series, a team with far better players than the Giants had, such as Eddie Collins and Shoeless Joe Jackson, and lost in six games.

The Giants were heavily favored to win the pennant again in 1918. They stayed close to the lead in the early part of the season, but due to players entering the military to fight in World War I (to which the patriotic McGraw did not object), did not have talent enough to catch the Cubs, who finished ahead of the Giants by 10 1/2 games. In the winter of 1918–19, after learning that Hempstead and the other Brush heirs wanted to sell, McGraw set about finding a buyer. He eventually found one in stockbroker Charles Stoneham, who, as part of the deal, took McGraw as a partner, and made him the team's vice president. McGraw bought his minority stake in the Giants with money loaned to him by Stoneham. The new owner of the Giants voiced full confidence in McGraw, and gave him a free hand in baseball matters; he was more than willing to provide funds to make the player transactions McGraw wanted.

In 1919, the Giants got out to their usual hot start, winning 24 of their first 32 games. Giants players Hal Chase and Heinie Zimmerman may have helped to throw key games against Cincinnati during the season as the Giants finished second to the Reds. After it became clear how corrupt gambling had influenced baseball during the 1919 season (the season of the infamous Chicago "Black Sox"), McGraw claimed to have taken action against both players, but though he suspended Zimmerman in mid-September, Chase remained with the Giants almost until the end of the season.

In 1920, the Giants were again a team in transition, with several older players remaining plus youngsters such as Ross Youngs and Frankie Frisch. There were setbacks, such as Frisch's absence due to appendicitis and two short suspensions for McGraw, who got into a (possibly alcohol-fueled) brawl at the Lambs' Club on August 8, and secluded himself in his apartment. In his absence, Johnny Evers, the coach, ran the team, though McGraw eventually allowed himself to be questioned by local prosecutors, as well as federal agents seeking to enforce the Prohibition era Volstead Act. McGraw eventually rejoined his team, but they could not overcome their deficit in the standings, and finished second again, behind Brooklyn. McGraw was acquitted of violating the Volstead Act by a federal jury.

=== 1921–1924 ===
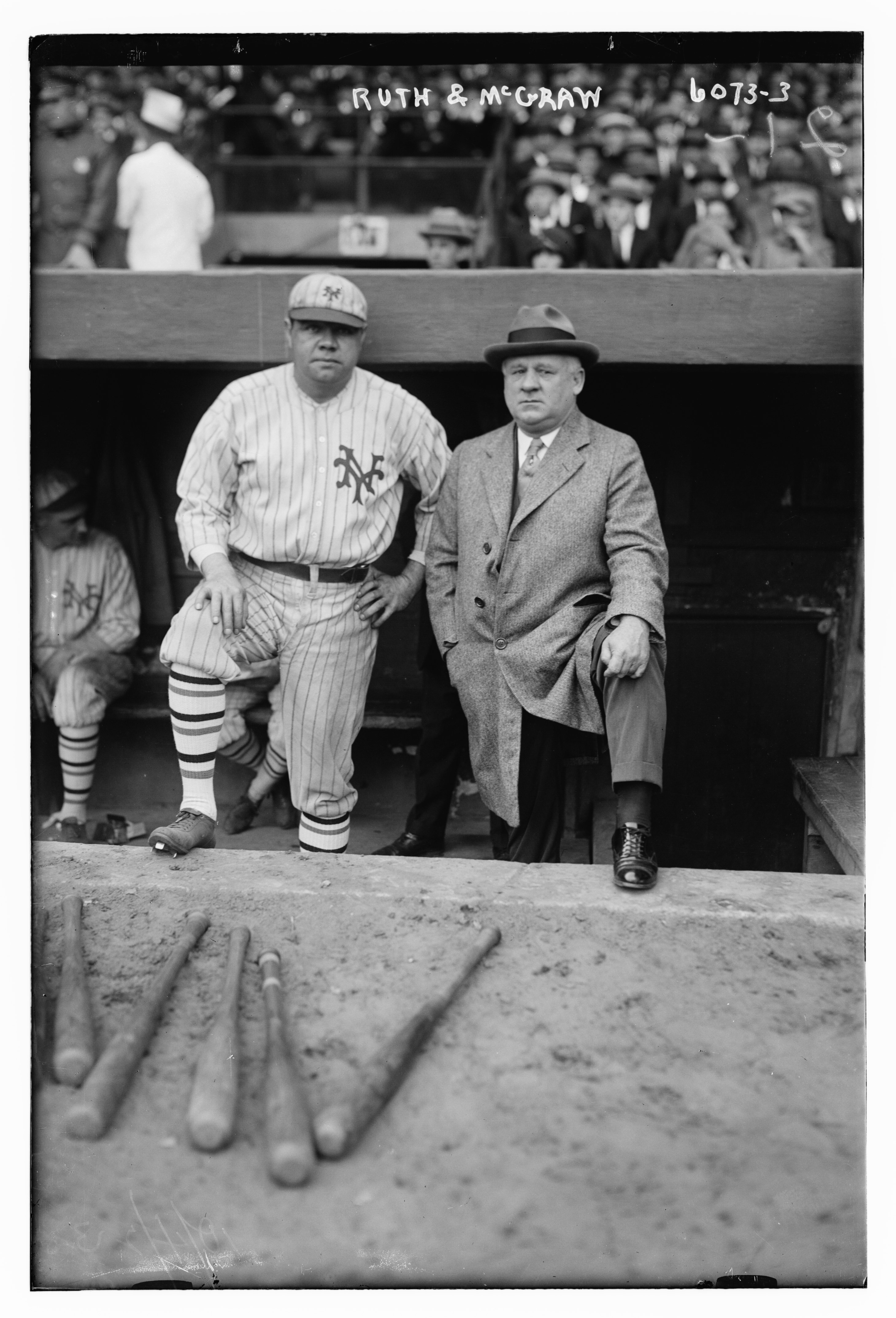
McGraw (right) with Babe Ruth

At the start of the 1921 season, McGraw felt that he had assembled his best team ever. This did not stop him from fiddling with his roster, as he in mid-season made a deal with the Phillies, acquiring, among others, Johnny Rawlings, Irish Meusel and Casey Stengel. The acquisition of Meusel allowed McGraw to shift Frisch to third base, while that of Stengel allowed McGraw to platoon (Note: That is, playing different players depending on whether the opposing pitcher is left- or right-handed, since right-handed batters are usually better able to hit left-handed pitchers, and left-handed batters better able to hit right-handed pitchers.) his outfielders. Stengel initially did not receive much playing time, which proved a boon to his own future career as a manager: not only did he get to watch McGraw in action on the bench, but often spent the night at the McGraw house, talking baseball until dawn. He watched as the Giants fell 7 1/2 games behind the Pirates, swept them in a five-game series in late August, passed them on September 11, and won the pennant by four games.

The 1921 World Series was against the New York Yankees. Tenants of the Giants at the Polo Grounds, the Yankees had substantially outdrawn their landlords since acquiring slugger Babe Ruth before the 1920 season. Facing serious competition for the money of the New York sports fan for the first time, Stoneham and McGraw had considered evicting the Yankees after the AL team set an MLB record by drawing more than a million fans in 1920, but had settled for a substantial rent increase. McGraw, a practitioner of inside baseball, was also offended by the Yankee game strategy, which seemed little more than to get on base and wait for Ruth to hit a home run. In 1921, while winning their first pennant, the Yankees again outdrew the Giants as Ruth hit 59 home runs. The Giants were shut out in the first two games of the best-of-nine series, but McGraw was confident his team would begin hitting. They did so in winning five of the next six games, with the Yankees hampered by an injury to Ruth that limited him, in the final games, to a pinch-hitting appearance in Game Eight. Manager of the World Series champion for the first time since 1905, McGraw stated, "I have the greatest baseball team in the world. And unquestionably the gamest."

Before the 1922 season, Stoneham gave McGraw a new five-year contract for $50,000 per year, a $10,000 raise, making McGraw the highest-paid figure in baseball excepting Ruth and Kenesaw Mountain Landis, the Commissioner of Baseball. McGraw made several player transactions before the season, acquiring Heinie Groh and Jimmy O'Connell. McGraw also persuaded Bill Terry, who would succeed him as manager, to sign with the Giants as a player, although Terry, who had a well-paying job with Standard Oil, was reluctant to sign. The Giants led the standings for most of the 1922 season, winning their second straight pennant. According to Alexander, "if it wasn't a great team, it was a very good one, a talented, experienced, smart bunch of ballplayers, virtually all of whom readily accepted the common estimate that, whatever his faults as a man, John McGraw was the greatest manager who'd ever lived." In the 1922 World Series, restored to a best-of-seven format, the Giants beat the Yankees four games to none, with one tie, as Giant pitchers held Ruth to only two hits and a .118 batting average. Not only had the Giants defeated the Yankees, but they evicted them as well: Stoneham had informed the Yankees they could not remain at the Polo Grounds beyond 1922 and Yankee Stadium was being built across the Harlem River from the Polo Grounds.

Before the 1923 season, McGraw published his memoirs, My Thirty Years in Baseball. The 1923 season saw the Giants in first place the whole season, though they did not run away from the field, earning their third straight pennant. In the 1923 World Series, though, the Yankees defeated the Giants four games to two, both won on home runs by McGraw's disciple, Stengel. McGraw had taken pride that Ruth had been held in check during the first two Yankees–Giants World Series, but in the 1923 series, he hit three home runs. The bitterness between the two teams had grown stronger after McGraw refused the Yankees permission to substitute rookie Lou Gehrig on the World Series roster for the injured Wally Pipp; although Gehrig had joined the Yankees too late in the season to be eligible, the team had obtained Landis's permission (subject to the opposing team's consent) and similar substitutions had been made in earlier years. After the season, McGraw sought to rebuild the Giants, making room for young players such as Terry by trading veterans such as Stengel.

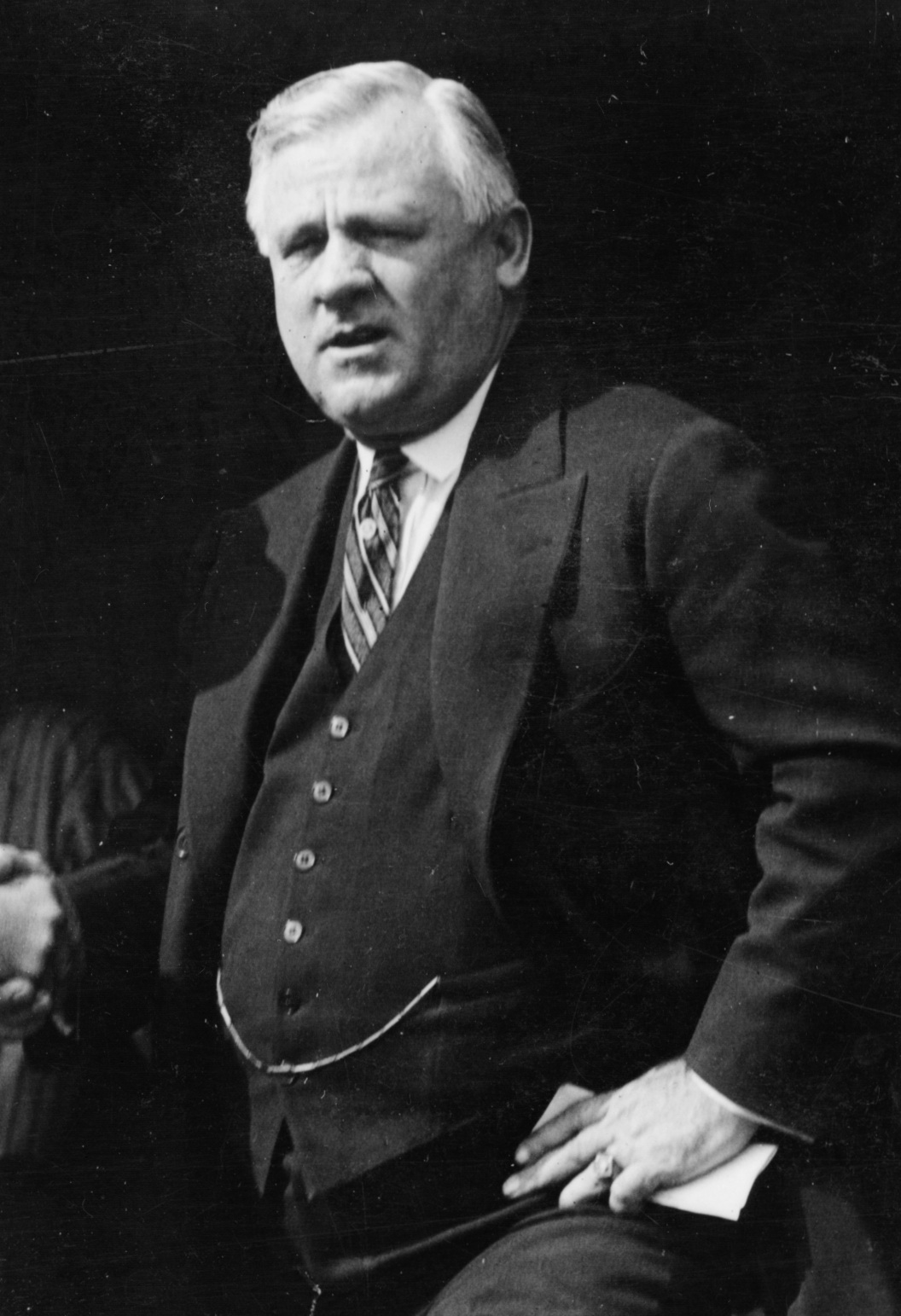
McGraw in 1924

In 1924, the Giants were challenged by Brooklyn, managed by Robinson. Brooklyn got off to a league-leading start and remained close, taking the league lead for a few hours on September 6 before the Giants won the second game of a doubleheader to edge back ahead. McGraw missed part of the season due to illness, and the Giants were managed by coach Hughie Jennings, McGraw's teammate with the old Orioles. The Giants won the pennant by beating the Phillies in the third-to-last game of the season, but the pennant was marred when Landis expelled O'Connell and coach Cozy Dolan of the Giants from baseball for trying to bribe Phillies shortstop Heinie Sand. Of the gambling scandals in baseball that had followed Landis's banning of the Black Sox, this was the second to involve the Giants: in 1922, pitcher Phil Douglas had been banned for life by Landis for an attempt to bribe Leslie Mann of the Cardinals. Although Dolan was a close ally of McGraw, who had once said he would be willing to kill a man for him, little suspicion fell on McGraw, who despite his violent reputation, was believed to be honest. In the 1924 World Series, the Giants were defeated in seven games by the Washington Senators. Nevertheless, the four straight pennants made the Giants the first team to play in four consecutive World Series, as of 2021 a feat equaled or bettered only by the Yankees of 1936–1939, 1949–1953, 1955–1958, 1960–1964 and 1998–2001.

=== 1925–1931 ===
During the remainder of McGraw's career, the Giants fielded some capable teams, but none proved good enough to win the pennant. The Giants were expected to win a fifth straight NL pennant in 1925, but early injuries forced them back, allowing the Pirates to take an early lead. In 1925, the Giants lost a series to the Pirates in August with both teams fighting for the league lead, could not recover, and finished 8 1/2 games back. The 1926 season saw the debut of sixteen-year-old Mel Ott, but the Giants finished with a losing record, 74–77, in fifth place, the worst finish since 1915. It was a bad year financially for McGraw, caught up in the Florida land boom at the Giants' spring training site at Sarasota. As McGraw's name had been used to sell lots, to preserve his reputation, he repaid investors $100,000.

Before the 1927 season, McGraw sent Frisch and Jimmy Ring to the Cardinals for their second-baseman player/manager, Rogers Hornsby. The trade of Hornsby, the World Series-winning manager for Frisch was, according to Alexander, likely the most sensational in baseball history to that point. Hornsby led the Giants as acting manager, as McGraw missed several games in the second half of the season due to sinusitis. Despite being in the pennant race almost until the end, the Giants finished third, two games behind the Pirates. After the season, Hornsby, who had hit .361, second in the league, but had quarreled with Giants team officials, was traded to the Braves.

Despite the loss of Hornsby, McGraw was convinced his 1928 team would win the pennant. The team was buoyed by the signing of pitcher Carl Hubbell, the team stayed in the hunt most of the way, but finished second, two games behind the Cardinals. Critics of McGraw stated that Giant castoff Hornsby had led the league in hitting, while pitcher Burleigh Grimes, also traded away by McGraw, had won 25 games, and if he had kept them, the Giants would have won the pennant. In 1929, the Giants were no match for the Hornsby-led Cubs, who led the league by 10 1/2 games and the Giants by 20 by the end of July. With little chance of a pennant, McGraw missed many games, ill at home, or scouting players, entrusting the team to Ray Schalk. The Giants finished third. In 1930, McGraw's Giants were in the pennant race almost until the end, but finished third, five games behind the Cardinals. In 1931, despite high expectations from McGraw, the Giants finished second, 13 games behind the Cardinals.

== Retirement and death ==
[McGraw] will long be remembered as the argumentative, profane, belligerent leader of the New York Giants who took no prisoners in a battle for baseball supremacy. Opposing clubs had to prepare for any eventuality when they faced him. The Reds, for example, worried that he contaminated their drinking water, forcing them to bring their own supply to the Polo Grounds. McGraw may not have tainted the water, but it was not beneath him, and, in any case, Cincinnati's concern gave the Giants an edge.

— Mark S. Halfon. Tales from the Deadball Era (2014), pp. 384–385

McGraw believed his 1932 team capable of winning the pennant, but the Giants got off to a poor start. McGraw missed much of a western road trip with illness, allowing Bancroft to manage during the subsequent homestand, or running the team from the clubhouse. By June 1, the team had fallen into last place. Some players by then were hostile to McGraw, resentful that he insisted on calling every pitch and, off the field, controlling their lifestyle. Enduring an increasing number of health issues, McGraw decided he could not go on as manager.

Frisch was McGraw's first choice as replacement, but the Cardinals, for whom Frisch was playing, refused. Bancroft was ruled out by his past failures as a manager for the Braves. Terry was the strongest candidate, and, after McGraw sounded him out, he became manager on June 3, 1932. McGraw remained as vice president.

During the remainder of the season, McGraw kept out of the way as Terry, who relaxed some of McGraw's strict rules for the players, led the team to a sixth-place finish. After spending much of the offseason in Cuba, McGraw was cheered by the crowd on opening day at the Polo Grounds. When the first All-Star Game was held in July 1933, McGraw was named as manager of the NL team, opposing Connie Mack, still managing the Athletics. Although he named the NL starting lineup, he took little part in managing the game itself, leaving that for Frisch and Terry as the AL beat the NL, 4–2. He stated he would not manage again, "I'm through with it. I have quit."

The Giants won the 1933 NL pennant. McGraw was present for all five games of the 1933 World Series, in which the Giants defeated the Senators, and spoke at the celebration at New York City Hall. By this time, he had been diagnosed with prostate cancer, which had spread. McGraw spent much of late 1933 and early 1934 at home with his wife Blanche in Pelham Manor, New York, going now and then to the Giants offices in Manhattan, and was even able to attend the NL meetings in New York. He was admitted to the hospital in New Rochelle on February 16. His wife remained with him, and he received visits from Stoneham and others. On February 24, he slipped into a coma, and was given the last rites of the Catholic Church. He died the following morning, aged 60.

Commissioner Landis stated that McGraw personified "the virile competitive nature of baseball". Terry called him, "far and away the greatest baseball manager of all time". Ty Cobb called McGraw someone, "who put everything he had into baseball, both as a player and manager ... the game needs more like him". The funeral mass took place at St. Patrick's Cathedral in New York on February 28, after which McGraw's body was conveyed by train to Baltimore, where it was placed in a vault at New Cathedral Cemetery, pending burial in the spring.

== Managerial statistics ==
Team	Year	Regular season					Postseason			
Team	Year	Games	Won	Lost	Pct.	Games	Won	Lost	Pct.	Notes
BLN	1899	148	86	62	.581	4th in NL	–	–	–	–
BLN total		148	86	62	.581		0	0	–	
BAL	1901	133	68	65	.511	5th in AL	–	–	–	–
BAL	1902	57	26	31	.456	dismissed*	–	–	–	–
BAL total		190	94	96	.495		0	0	–	
NYG	1902	63	25	38	.397	8th in NL	–	–	–	–
NYG	1903	139	84	55	.604	2nd in NL	–	–	–	–
NYG	1904	153	106	47	.693	1st in NL	0	0	–	World Series not played (BOA)
NYG	1905	153	105	48	.686	1st in NL	4	1	.800	Won World Series (PHA)
NYG	1906	152	96	56	.632	2nd in NL	–	–	–	–
NYG	1907	153	82	71	.536	4th in NL	–	–	–	–
NYG	1908	154	98	56	.636	3rd in NL	–	–	–	–
NYG	1909	153	92	61	.601	3rd in NL	–	–	–	–
NYG	1910	154	91	63	.591	2nd in NL	–	–	–	–
NYG	1911	153	99	54	.647	1st in NL	2	4	.333	Lost World Series (PHA)
NYG	1912	151	103	48	.682	1st in NL	3	4	.429	Lost World Series (BOS)
NYG	1913	152	101	51	.664	1st in NL	1	4	.200	Lost World Series (PHA)
NYG	1914	154	84	70	.545	2nd in NL	–	–	–	–
NYG	1915	152	69	83	.454	8th in NL	–	–	–	–
NYG	1916	152	86	66	.566	4th in NL	–	–	–	–
NYG	1917	154	98	56	.636	1st in NL	2	4	.333	Lost World Series (CWS)
NYG	1918	124	71	53	.573	2nd in NL	–	–	–	–
NYG	1919	140	87	53	.621	2nd in NL	–	–	–	–
NYG	1920	154	86	68	.558	2nd in NL	–	–	–	–
NYG	1921	153	94	59	.614	1st in NL	5	3	.625	Won World Series (NYY)
NYG	1922	154	93	61	.604	1st in NL	4	0	1.000	Won World Series (NYY)
NYG	1923	153	95	58	.621	1st in NL	2	4	.333	Lost World Series (NYY)
NYG	1924	29	16	13	.552	1st in NL	3	4	.429	Lost World Series (WSH)
NYG	1924	80	45	35	.563	1st in NL	3	4	.429	Lost World Series (WSH)
NYG	1925	14	10	4	.714	2nd in NL	–	–	–	–
NYG	1925	106	55	51	.519	2nd in NL	–	–	–	–
NYG	1926	151	74	77	.490	5th in NL	–	–	–	–
NYG	1927	122	70	52	.574	leave	–	–	–	–
NYG	1928	154	93	61	.604	2nd in NL	–	–	–	–
NYG	1929	151	84	67	.556	3rd in NL	–	–	–	–
NYG	1930	154	87	67	.565	3rd in NL	–	–	–	–
NYG	1931	152	87	65	.572	2nd in NL	–	–	–	–
NYG	1932	40	17	23	.425	resigned	–	–	–	–
NYG total		4373	2583	1790	.591		26	28	.481	
Total		4711	2763	1948	.586		26	28	.481	

* Also released as a player since McGraw was a player/manager.

== Aftermath and posthumous honors ==
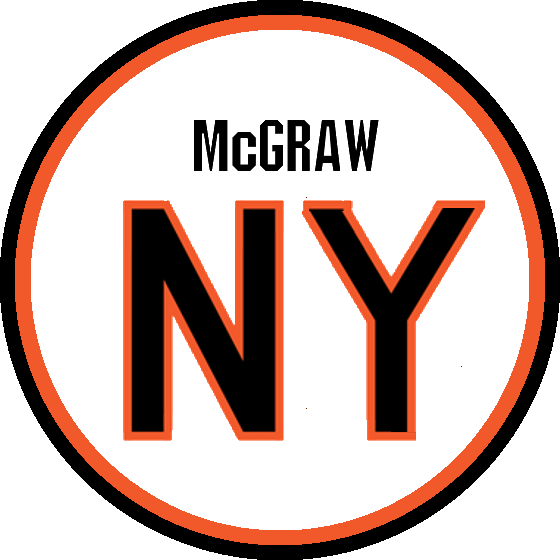
John McGraw was honored alongside the retired numbers of the San Francisco Giants in 1986.

Blanche McGraw outlived her husband by nearly 30 years, dying on November 4, 1962. She had a lifetime pass to a box at the Polo Grounds until the Giants left for San Francisco before the 1958 season, attending many times, including when her husband was honored on opening day at the Polo Grounds on April 17, 1934, and later that year at the 1934 All-Star Game there, when a plaque to McGraw was unveiled. She was present when the National Baseball Hall of Fame in Cooperstown, New York, was opened in 1939: her husband had been elected in 1937, along with Keeler and Mathewson, and thereafter attended many of the induction ceremonies. She attended every World Series game the Giants played at the Polo Grounds during her widowhood. Saddened by the Giants' move to California, she nevertheless attended their last game at the Polo Grounds as well as their first game in San Francisco, and, in 1962, returned to the Polo Grounds when National League baseball did, for the home opener of the expansion New York Mets.

In 1938, the Giants journeyed to McGraw's birthplace of Truxton to play a local team, the proceeds from the game to be used to erect a memorial to McGraw there. The John McGraw Monument was erected in 1942, standing in the center of Truxton village.

Although McGraw played before numbers were worn on jerseys, the Giants in 1986 placed him among the players and honorees whose numbers they have retired. In honor of the days he spent coaching there, St. Bonaventure University in 1958 named its athletic fields after McGraw and his teammate, fellow coach and fellow Hall of Famer Hughie Jennings.

== Managerial techniques ==
McGraw, along with Casey Stengel, has managed the most league pennants, with ten. He also holds the NL record for seasons managed, with 31 (thirty with the Giants and one with the original Orioles). He is third among major league managers in wins with 2,763, behind Connie Mack and Tony La Russa, though, at .586, McGraw's winning percentage as a manager is about .050 higher than La Russa's and .100 higher than Mack's.

According to Solomon, McGraw "was hard on his players—that understated things–but he made them play their best. They wanted to play for him. For he cared about little but winning". Frank Deford called McGraw "the model for the classic American coach—a male version of the whore with a heart of gold—a tough, flinty so-and-so who was field-smart, a man's man his players came to love despite themselves." McGraw took chances on players, signing some who had been discarded by other teams, often getting a few more good seasons out of them. Sometimes these risks paid off; other times, they did not work out. McGraw took a risk in signing famed athlete Jim Thorpe in 1913. Thorpe had an undistinguished major league career, not because he lacked athletic ability, but because "he couldn't hit a ball that curved." McGraw sought to control his players on the field, where he called every pitch and play. Legend has it that he once fined a player for hitting a game-winning home run, for McGraw had called a bunt.

McGraw was one of the first to use a relief pitcher to save games. He pitched Claude Elliott in relief eight times in his ten appearances in 1905. Though saves were not an official statistic until 1969, Elliot was retroactively credited with six saves that season, the most of any pitcher to that point. In 1906, the Giants' George Ferguson became the first reliever with more than 20 appearances, and Doc Crandall repeatedly set records for relief appearances between 1909 and 1913.

Both a detail person and an inspirational leader, McGraw, according to Bill James, "lived to teach young men how to play baseball. I mean, he loved the horses, he loved the stage, he loved his cigars, and he loved his whiskey, but teaching young men to play baseball was what he did ... Over the course of his career, he took on many, many young men with no minor league experience or very little minor league experience, and worked with them until they became outstanding players." Chris Jaffe, in his study of baseball managers, wrote, "the best managers, such as McGraw and Chance, were those who could transform raw clumps of talent into majestic creations." McGraw's teams were constructed to get on base more often than his opponents, for teams that do more often win. McGraw's hit differential as manager (hits by his team less hits allowed), bases on balls differential, and hit by pitch differentials are the best in baseball history: McGraw's Giants took more hits by pitch than they inflicted every year from 1903 to 1929, a streak unequalled by any major league team. Although McGraw, an exponent of inside baseball, disliked the home run era, which he considered less interesting, he was flexible enough to find himself sluggers in his drive to win. Nevertheless, McGraw never appreciated the farm system built by Branch Rickey of the Cardinals to develop young talent in the minor leagues that resulted in the Cardinals winning nine pennants in 21 seasons between 1926 and 1946, and the Giants fell behind not only the Cardinals but other teams in that department.

McGraw believed that he had to eliminate any potential distractions that could cause his teams to lose. For example, Stengel recalled that McGraw would go over the meal tickets at the team hotel, and was not shy about telling his players that they were not eating right. For most of his tenure, he set a curfew of 11:30 pm for road trips; he and his coaches would knock on the players' hotel room doors at 11:30 pm sharp. He fined players for fraternizing with members of other teams and would not tolerate smiling in the dugout. As James put it, with McGraw, "the rules were well understood". Anyone who breached these standards would answer to McGraw himself, generally not a pleasant experience. As Arlie Latham, McGraw's longtime coach, put it, "McGraw eats gunpowder for breakfast and washes it down with warm blood."

Jaffe felt the nearest modern parallel to McGraw was Bobby Knight, the temperamental—but highly successful—basketball coach. In his almost thirty years with the Giants, McGraw produced many fine players but few true superstars—another parallel with Bobby Knight, whose only true NBA star was Isiah Thomas; both McGraw and Knight sought players who would fit their system. According to Jaffe, "McGraw won ten pennants in 30 years based on his ability to work with players like Fred Merkle and Fred Snodgrass. McGraw coaxed four consecutive pennants out of a team led by Ross Youngs, George Kelly, Dave Bancroft, and a foundling Frisch ... McGraw had a plan, found the guys who fit into it, and pushed them relentlessly."

== Works ==
- "The Value of Team Work," Chicago Daily Socialist, vol. 5, no. 137 (April 5, 1911), p. 4.
- My Thirty Years in Baseball. New York: Boni and Liveright, 1923.

== See also ==
- List of Major League Baseball career runs scored leaders
- List of Major League Baseball annual runs scored leaders
- List of Major League Baseball career stolen bases leaders
- List of Major League Baseball managers with most career ejections
- List of Major League Baseball managers with most career wins
- List of Major League Baseball player-managers
- List of St. Louis Cardinals team records

== Sources ==
- Alexander, Charles C. (1995). John McGraw. University of Nebraska Press. ISBN 978-0-8032-5925-6.
- Appel, Marty (2012). Pinstripe Empire: The New York Yankees From Before the Babe to After the Boss (ebook ed.). New York: Bloomsbury USA. ISBN 978-1-60819-492-6.
- Deford, Frank (2005). The Old Ball Game: How John McGraw, Christy Mathewson, and the New York Giants Created Modern Baseball (ebook ed.). Grove Press. ISBN 978-1-5558-4627-5.
- Felber, Bill (2007). A Game of Brawl: The Orioles, the Beaneaters, and the Battle for the 1897 Pennant. University of Nebraska Press. ISBN 978-0-8032-1136-0.
- Goldman, Steven (2005). Forging Genius: the Making of Casey Stengel. Potomac Books, Inc. ISBN 978-1-57488-873-7.
- Graham, Frank (2002) [1952]. The New York Giants: An Informal History of a Great Baseball Club. Southern Illinois University Press. ISBN 978-0-8093-2415-6.
- Halfon, Mark S. (2014). Tales from the Deadball Era: Ty Cobb, Home Run Baker, Shoeless Joe Jackson, and the Wildest Times in Baseball History. University of Nebraska Press. ISBN 978-1-61234-649-6.
- Hynd, Noel (2019) [1995]. The Giants of the Polo Grounds: The Glorious Times of Baseball's New York Giants. Red Cat Tales Publishing LLC. ISBN 978-1-7270-4097-5.
- Jaffe, Chris (2010). Evaluating Baseball's Managers (eBook ed.). McFarland & Company. ISBN 978-0-7864-3920-1.
- James, Bill (1997). The Bill James Guide to Baseball Managers from 1870 to Today (eBook ed.). Diversion Books. ISBN 978-1-62681-263-5.
- Klein, Maury (2016). Stealing Games: How John McGraw Transformed Baseball with the 1911 New York Giants (eBook ed.). Bloomsbury Press. ISBN 978-1-63286-026-2.
- Murphy, Cait N. (2007). Crazy '08: How a Cast of Cranks, Rogues, Boneheads, and Magnates Created the Greatest Year in Baseball History (eBook ed.). HarperCollins e-books. ISBN 978-0-06-088938-8.
- Solomon, Burt (2000) [1999]. Where They Ain't: The Fabled Life and Untimely Death of the Original Baltimore Orioles, the Team that Gave Birth to Modern Baseball (paperback ed.). Doubleday. ISBN 978-0-684-85451-9.
- Voigt, David Quentin (1998). The League That Failed. Scarecrow Press. ISBN 978-0-8108-3309-8.
