= Baltimore Oriole (disambiguation) =

The Baltimore oriole is a bird species.

Baltimore Oriole(s) may also refer to:

== Sports ==
- Baltimore Orioles, a Major League Baseball team since 1954
- Baltimore Orioles (1882–1899), an 1882–1899 baseball team in the old American Association and the National League
- Baltimore Orioles (Atlantic Association), an 1890 baseball team of the Atlantic Association
  - Baltimore Orioles F.C., an affiliated American League of Professional Football soccer club
- Baltimore Orioles (1901–1902), a Major League Baseball team and charter member of the American League in 1901
- Baltimore Orioles (minor league) (1903–1914 and 1916–1953), two baseball teams in the old Eastern League (1892–1911) and later reorganized as the International League on the Triple AAA minor leagues level
- Baltimore Orioles (ice hockey), a minor league team that operated from 1932 until 1942

== Music ==
- "Baltimore Oriole" (song), a song written by Hoagy Carmichael and Paul Francis Webster

== See also ==
- Oriole (disambiguation)
