= Sydney Frank =

American business executive and Major League Baseball owner

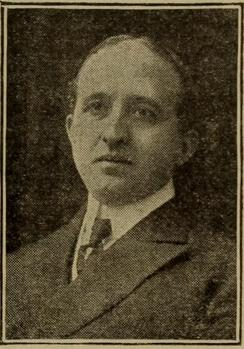
- Frank, c. 1902
- Born: Baltimore, Maryland, US
- Died: unknown, after 1920
- Occupations: Stock brokerage executive; Owner of the Baltimore Orioles (1901–1902)

Sydney Frank (Note: Frank's first name sometimes appeared as "Sidney" in contemporary newspapers.) (died after 1920) was an American business executive, and president and owner of the Baltimore Orioles professional baseball team at the inception of the American League in 1901. (Note: Frank's team was not the current Baltimore Orioles franchise but an original American League team which folded after two seasons.)

== Career ==
Notice in The Baltimore Sun in advance of the 1908 presidential election

Frank served as team president of the Baltimore Orioles of the American League in 1901, their inaugural season. John Mahon was elected to succeed Frank as chairman at the annual stockholders' meeting in February 1902. Outside of baseball, Frank managed the brokerage firm of Arthur Lipper & Company, and his business obligations were cited as the reason that he did not continue as president of the Orioles.

When Mahon sold his controlling interest in the Orioles to John T. Brush and Andrew Freedman of the National League, Ban Johnson, president of the American League, joined with Frank and other minority owners of the Orioles to seize control of the team. The Orioles franchise relocated to New York City for the 1903 season, becoming the New York Highlanders, and since 1913 have been the New York Yankees.

Following Frank's sale of his interest in the Orioles, there would not be another Jewish owner in the American League for nearly a half-century, until former player Hank Greenberg took an ownership position in the Cleveland Indians in 1949.

== Personal life ==
Frank was born in Baltimore in 1872, and had one sibling, a sister, Alice, who died in August 1916.

Frank married Florence Hortense Holzman in November 1906. As of November 1910, Frank was living on Madison Avenue in Baltimore, per a newspaper report of his house being robbed. As of the 1920 Census, he was living on Fifth Avenue in New York City, apparently alone. Later information about his personal life is unknown.
