= Jimmy Hart (baseball) =

American baseball player (1875-1926)

- First baseman
- Born: November 27, 1875; St. Paul, Minnesota, U.S.
- Died: August 31, 1926 (aged 50); Los Angeles, California, U.S.
- Batted: Both Threw: Unknown

MLB debut
- June 6, 1901, for the Baltimore Orioles

Last MLB appearance
- August 24, 1901, for the Baltimore Orioles

MLB statistics
- Batting average: .311
- Home runs: 0
- Runs batted in: 23
- Stats at Baseball Reference

Teams
- Baltimore Orioles (1901)

James John Hart (November 27, 1875 – August 31, 1926) was an American professional baseball player. He played in Major League Baseball (MLB) as a first baseman for the Baltimore Orioles in 1901, the first major-league season of the American League (AL).

In 58 career major-league games, Hart had 64 hits in 206 at-bats, with 23 runs batted in (RBIs). On August 5, 1901, Hart punched umpire John Haskell after being called out at third base. AL president Ban Johnson suspended Hart as result of the incident, stating: "This is the first time a player in the American League has struck an umpire‚ and it is an offense that cannot be overlooked."
