= Joe Kelley =

American baseball player (1871–1943)

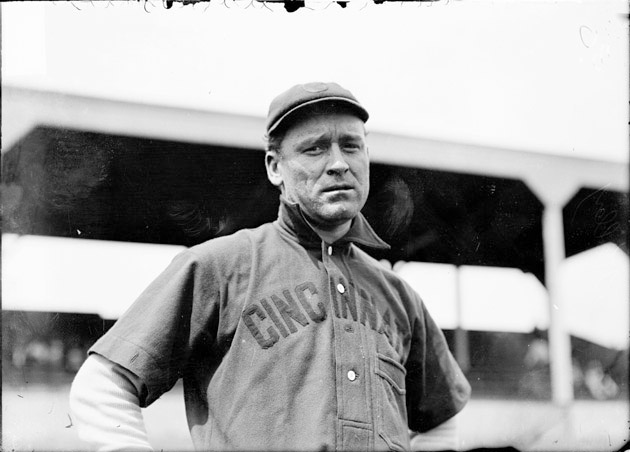
- Kelley with the Cincinnati Reds in 1903
- Left fielder / Manager
- Born: December 9, 1871; Cambridge, Massachusetts, U.S.
- Died: August 14, 1943 (aged 71); Baltimore, Maryland, U.S.
- Batted: Right Threw: Right

MLB debut
- July 27, 1891, for the Boston Beaneaters

Last MLB appearance
- October 8, 1908, for the Boston Doves

MLB statistics
- Batting average: .317
- Hits: 2,220
- Home runs: 65
- Runs batted in: 1,194
- Stolen bases: 443
- Managerial record: 338–321
- Winning %: .512
- Stats at Baseball Reference
- Managerial record at Baseball Reference

Teams
- As player: Boston Beaneaters (1891); Pittsburgh Pirates (1892); Baltimore Orioles (NL) (1892–1898); Brooklyn Superbas (1899–1901); Baltimore Orioles (AL) (1902); Cincinnati Reds (1902–1906); Boston Doves (1908); As manager: Cincinnati Reds (1902–1905); Boston Doves (1908)

Career highlights and awards
- NL stolen base leader (1896)

Member of the National

Baseball Hall of Fame
- Induction: 1971
- Election method: Veterans Committee

Joseph James Kelley (December 9, 1871 – August 14, 1943) was an American left fielder in Major League Baseball (MLB) who starred in the outfield of the Baltimore Orioles teams of the 1890s. Making up the nucleus of the Orioles along with John McGraw, Willie Keeler, and Hughie Jennings, Kelley received the nickname "Kingpin of the Orioles".

In his MLB career, Kelley played in the National League (NL) for the Boston Beaneaters (1891), Pittsburgh Pirates (1892), Baltimore Orioles (1892–1898), and Brooklyn Superbas (1899–1901), before he jumped to the upstart American League to play for the Baltimore Orioles (1902). He returned to the NL with Cincinnati Reds (1902–1906) and Boston Doves (1908). Kelley served as player-manager of the Reds (1902–1905) and Doves (1908). After extending his career in the minor leagues, he coached the Brooklyn Robins (1926), and scouted for the New York Yankees (1915–1916).

Kelley was regarded as an excellent batter, a good base runner, and a great leader. Over his seventeen-season MLB career, Kelley had a .317 batting average, and batted over .300 in eleven consecutive seasons. Kelley stole a career-high 87 bases in the 1896 season, which led MLB. He finished in the league's top ten in categories such as batting average, home runs, runs batted in (RBI), and stolen bases numerous times. He served as team captain of the Orioles and the Superbas. In recognition of his career achievements, Kelley was elected a member of the National Baseball Hall of Fame by the Veterans Committee in 1971.

== Early life ==
Joseph James Kelley was born on December 9, 1871, in Cambridge, Massachusetts, to Patrick Kelly and Ann Kelly (née Carney) in Cambridge, Massachusetts on December 9, 1871. Kelley's parents emigrated to the United States from Ireland, and he had five siblings. According to the 1880 United States census, Patrick worked as a marble cutter.

As a child, Kelley was educated at a parochial grammar school and St. Thomas Aquinas College in Cambridge, where he starred for the school's baseball team as a pitcher. He worked for a local piano manufacturer and the John P. Lowell Arms Company. He practiced with the Harvard Crimson, the college baseball team of Harvard University, and played semi-professional baseball for the Lowell Arms Company.

== Professional career ==
=== Minor leagues ===
Kelley made his professional debut with the Lowell Indians of the New England League (NEL) in 1891, at age 19. During games he did not pitch, Lowell's manager put him in the lineup as an infielder. Kelley had a 10–3 win–loss record and a NEL-leading .323 batting average with Lowell.

=== Boston Beaneaters (1891) ===
Lowell folded in July. Three days later, Kelley signed with the Boston Beaneaters of the National League (NL). Kelley made his major league debut in August 1891 with the Beaneaters. After batting .244 in twelve games played, the Beaneaters released Kelley after the season. Kelley began the 1892 season with the Omaha Omahogs of the Class–A Western League, turning down a $1,200 salary ($43,000 in current dollar terms) from the Oakland Oaks of the Pacific Coast League. With Omaha, Kelley batted .316 with 19 stolen bases in 58 games.

=== Pittsburgh Pirates (1892) ===
The Pittsburgh Pirates of the NL purchased Kelley's contract from Omaha for $500 ($17,917 in current dollar terms) on July 2, 1892.

=== Baltimore Orioles (NL) (1892–1898) ===
Ned Hanlon, new manager of the Baltimore Orioles, traded George Van Haltren to the Pirates for Kelley and $2,000 ($71,667 in current dollar terms) in September 1892. Hanlon had succeeded Van Haltren as Orioles' manager during the season; remaining with the Orioles as a player, Van Haltren openly criticized Hanlon. Hanlon mentioned that he "had [his] eye on Kelley for a long time."

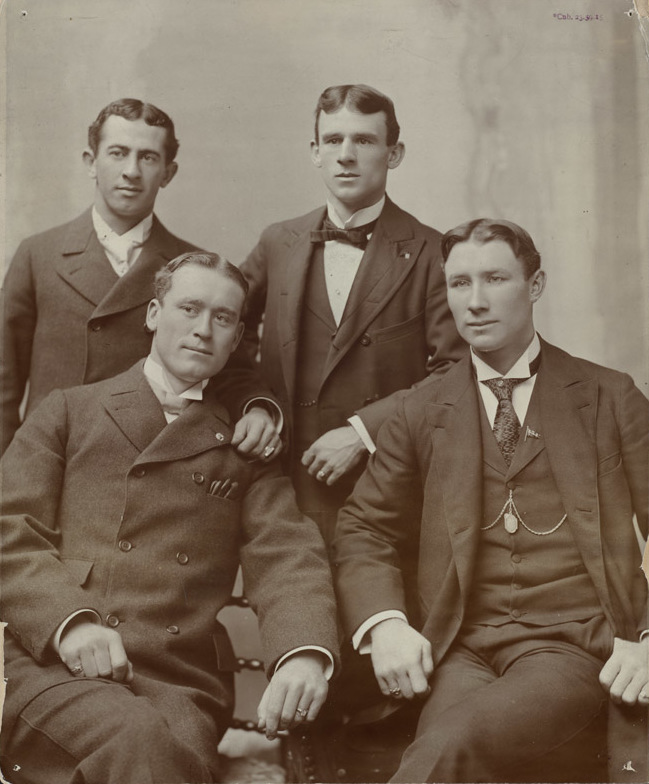
Kelley (sitting, left) with Baltimore Orioles teammates Hughie Jennings (sitting, right), Willie Keeler (standing, left), and John McGraw (standing, right)

Hanlon taught Kelley how to play center field. During the 1893 season, Kelley batted .305, with 120 runs scored, and stole 33 bases. He finished ninth in the NL with a .476 slugging percentage (SLG), and tied Eddie Burke for ninth in home runs with 9. The Orioles won the NL pennant in 1894, 1895, and 1896. Kelley moved to left field in 1894 with the acquisition of Steve Brodie, who played center. That year, he batted .393 with 111 runs batted in (RBI), 199 hits, and 165 runs scored, tying teammate Willie Keeler for second in runs and finishing sixth in batting average and eighth in hits. Combined with 107 walks, which were tied for second most in the NL with Cupid Childs and behind only Billy Hamilton, Kelley posted a .502 on-base percentage (OBP), finishing second in the NL to Hamilton, and hit 48 doubles, good for second in the NL, behind only Hugh Duffy. His .602 SLG was the fourth best in the NL.

These Orioles teams, led by John McGraw, were known to break the rules in order to win, including tampering with their bats and the playing field. Kelley hid baseballs in the outfield, using the closest hidden ball instead of finding the ball batted into the outfield. Kelley hit ten home runs in 1895, a then-franchise record, tying him for fifth in the NL with five other players. He also tied Brodie for second with 134 RBI, finished fourth with 54 stolen bases, fifth with a .546 SLG, and sixth with a .456 OBP. In 1896, Kelley finished seventh in the NL in batting average (.364), fourth in runs scored (148), fourth in SLG (.543), fifth in OBP (.469), ninth in hits (189), and tied Gene DeMontreville for eighth in home runs (8).

In 1897, Kelley agreed to serve as the coach of the Georgetown Hoyas, the college baseball team of Georgetown University. That year, he finished fifth in the NL in batting average (.362) and RBI (118), seventh in OBP (.447), and eighth in SLG (.489).

By 1898, Kelley earned an annual salary of $2,500 ($96,750 in current dollar terms), plus a $200 ($7,740 in current dollar terms) bonus for serving as team captain. He finished third in the league with 110 RBI and ninth with a .438 SLG. Due to insolvency, the Brooklyn Superbas purchased the Orioles after the 1898 season and transferred Kelley, Hanlon, Keeler, Joe McGinnity, and Hughie Jennings to Brooklyn. Wanting an opportunity to manage, and to remain near Baltimore, Kelley requested a transfer to the Washington Senators, but Washington did not have enough talent to send to Brooklyn to make a trade.

=== Brooklyn Superbas (1899–1901) ===
With McGraw remaining in Baltimore, Hanlon named Kelley team captain. The Superbas won the NL pennant in 1899 and 1900, as Kelley finished tenth in RBI (93), OBP (.410), and tied several players for tenth in home runs (6) in 1899 and led the team with a .319 batting average in 1900, while finishing fourth in the league in SLG (.485), tying Hickman for seventh in RBI (91), and tying Jimmy Collins and Buck Freeman for tenth in home runs (6).

Kelley moved back to the infield, becoming the regular first baseman in 1901.

=== Baltimore Orioles (AL) (1902) ===
After the 1901 season, Kelley denied reports that he would jump from the Superbas to the Detroit Tigers of the American League (AL), the former Western League which had decided to compete with the NL by creating franchises in east coast cities that housed NL franchises. However, the opportunity to return to Baltimore proved irresistible to Kelley, and after the AL's successful 1901 season, he jumped from the Superbas to the Baltimore Orioles AL. Kelley's father-in-law, John Mahon, was president and principal share holder of the AL's Orioles.

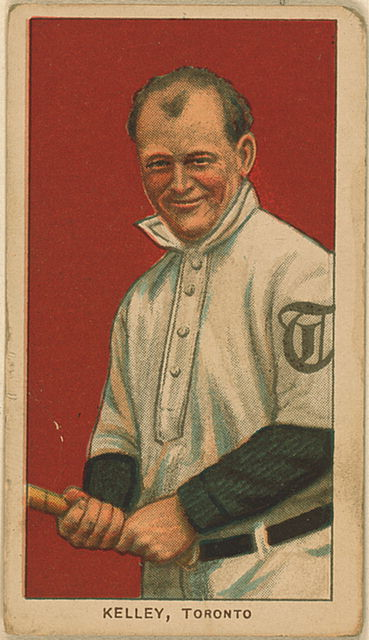
Kelley's 1909 American Tobacco Company baseball card

Kelley was named Orioles' captain and received some stock in the team. McGraw, player-manager of the Orioles, resigned from the team to take over as manager of the New York Giants on July 7, 1902. In his absence, Kelley and Wilbert Robinson took over in the interim. Under indefinite suspension by Ban Johnson by July 1902 for fighting with umpires, Kelley entertained the idea of leaving the Orioles with McGraw, who was becoming frustrated with Johnson, and had begun negotiating to join the New York Giants of the NL. With the team in financial straits, Kelley sold his shares of the Orioles to Mahon, who had purchased McGraw's shares when he left for New York, becoming principal shareholder of the Orioles. Mahon then sold controlling interest in the Orioles to Andrew Freedman, principal owner of the Giants, and John T. Brush, principal owner of the Cincinnati Reds, on July 17. On the day they owned the franchise, they released the best players on the Orioles from their contracts so that they could be signed by National League teams: Kelley and Cy Seymour signed with the Reds, while McGinnity, Roger Bresnahan, Dan McGann, and Jack Cronin signed with the Giants. Johnson, along with Orioles minority owners, took control of the Orioles franchise, which had to forfeit their game that day as they did not have enough players. Kelley stated that the Orioles owed $12,000 ($446,538 in current dollar terms), and that selling his shares was the only way Mahon could pay the team's debts.

=== Cincinnati Reds (1902–1906) ===
The Superbas lodged a complaint against the Reds, claiming that Kelley was still under their control, seeking compensation from the Reds. However, the other NL owners saw the situation as a coup for their league, and compelled Hanlon to drop his complaint. Kelley did not immediately report to Cincinnati, instead traveling to Boston to attempt to convince members of the Boston Americans to join him in the NL. Kelley joined the Reds on July 31.

== Managerial career ==
With rumors that Kelley was negotiating to become the Reds' manager, incumbent manager Bid McPhee resigned, and Kelley succeeded him. Kelley served as manager of the Reds from 1902 until 1905. In 1903, Kelley finished ninth in the NL in OBP (.402). He was dismissed as manager after the 1905 season, and replaced by Hanlon. He remained as a Reds player for the 1906 season. He batted .228 during the 1906 season, and the Reds released him.

Kelley signed with the Toronto Maple Leafs of the Class–AA International League (IL) in 1907, receiving a $5,000 salary ($172,768 in current dollar terms), the highest for a minor league player to date. Kelley batted .322 for the Maple Leafs as a part-time player, spending time in left field and first base. The Maple Leafs won the IL pennant that season.

=== Boston Doves (1908) ===
With Fred Tenney set to leave the Boston Doves of the NL for the Giants, the Doves claimed Kelley from the Maple Leafs, signing Kelley to a two-year contract with an annual salary of $5,500 ($197,083 in current dollar terms). Kelley announced that he would play left field. Kelley feuded with Doves' owner George Dovey, as Dovey wanted George Browne fined for "indifferent play", which Kelley refused to do. Dovey fired Kelley in December 1908. Kelley threatened legal action against Dovey, stating in the press that Dovey was releasing him to cut salary. Kelley and Dovey settled their case, freeing Kelley from the second year of his Doves contract.

== Later career ==
Maple Leafs president James McCafferey secured Kelley's return to the club in 1909. He played with the Maple Leafs through 1910, managing the Maple Leafs from 1912 to 1914, winning a second pennant in 1912.

After the 1914 season, the Maple Leafs released Kelley. The New York Yankees considered hiring Kelley as their manager after the 1914 season. Kelley scouted for the Yankees in 1915 and 1916. Former teammate Wilbert Robinson, then manager of the Brooklyn Robins, hired Kelley and McGinnity to join his coaching staff for the 1926 MLB season. Kelley and McGinnity were not retained after the season.

== Legacy ==
Joe had no prominent weakness. He was fast on the bases, could hit the ball hard and was as graceful an outfielder as one would care to see. He covered an immense amount of ground and had that necessary faculty, so prominent in Speaker and others, of being able to place himself where the batter would be likely to hit the ball.

— John McGraw

As a player, Kelley had 11 consecutive .300-plus seasons during his MLB career. Kelley was also known as a good base runner and stole a career-high 87 bases in 1896. He retired with a career .317 batting, .402 OBP, 65 home runs, 1,421 runs, 1,194 RBI and 443 stolen bases in 1,853 career games. His 194 triples ranks him ninth all-time. Kelley tied Fred Carroll's MLB record with nine hits in a doubleheader, which he presently shares with eight other players.

Additionally, he was known as a great leader. He compiled a 338–321 win–loss record as an MLB manager.

Kelley was considered by the Veterans Committee for induction into the National Baseball Hall of Fame in 1964, but was not selected. He was voted into the Hall of Fame by the Veterans Committee in 1971.

== Personal life ==
Kelley married Margaret Mahon on October 26, 1897. Keeler served as Kelley's best man, and McGraw and Jennings served as groomsmen. Kelley is buried at New Cathedral Cemetery.

== See also ==
- List of Major League Baseball career hits leaders
- List of Major League Baseball career triples leaders
- List of Major League Baseball career runs scored leaders
- List of Major League Baseball career runs batted in leaders
- List of Major League Baseball annual stolen base leaders
- List of Major League Baseball career stolen bases leaders
- List of Major League Baseball triples records
- List of Major League Baseball player-managers
