= Chappie Snodgrass =

American baseball player (1870–1951)

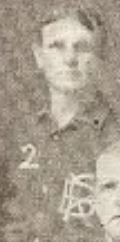
- Snodgrass with the Baton Rouge Red Sticks in 1904
- Outfielder
- Born: March 18, 1870; Springfield, Ohio, US
- Died: September 9, 1951 (aged 81); New York City, US
- Batted: Right Threw: Right

MLB debut
- May 15, 1901, for the Baltimore Orioles

Last MLB appearance
- May 16, 1901, for the Baltimore Orioles

MLB statistics
- Batting average: .100
- Home runs: 0
- Run batted in: 1
- Stats at Baseball Reference

Teams
- Baltimore Orioles (1901)

Amzie Beal "Chappie" Snodgrass (May 18, 1870 – September 9, 1951) was an American Major League Baseball (MLB) outfielder. Snodgrass played for the Baltimore Orioles in the 1901 season. On May 15, he batted third in the lineup and recorded his first and only hit. Over three games, he had one hit in ten at-bats. He batted and threw right-handed.

He was born in Springfield, Ohio, and died in New York City.
