= John Mahon (baseball) =

American politician in Baltimore and baseball team owner

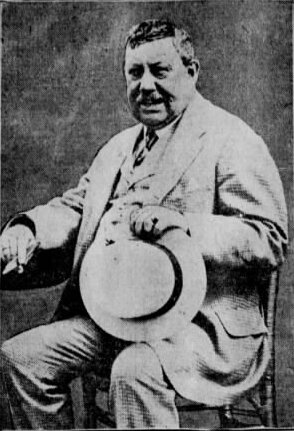
- Mahon in a 1914 newspaper
- Born: August 1851; Baltimore, Maryland, U.S.
- Died: June 19, 1928 (aged 76); Baltimore, Maryland, U.S.
- Occupations: Member of the Baltimore City Council; Owner of the Baltimore Orioles (1902)
- Political party: Democratic
- Spouses: Ellen Ward; Annie Berry

John J. "Sonny" Mahon (August 1851 – June 19, 1928) was an American politician and professional baseball executive. He served as president and principal owner of the Baltimore Orioles of the American League in 1902. He was also a notable political boss in Baltimore, affiliated with the Democratic Party.

== Biography ==
Mahon was born in Baltimore in 1851; his parents had emigrated to the United States from Ireland. He became a political boss associated with the Democratic Party, serving 14 years as a member of the Baltimore City Council. He was considered a Democratic political leader of Baltimore during his career.

Mahon succeeded Sydney Frank as team president of the American League's (AL) Baltimore Orioles in 1902. The franchise would later relocate to New York City, becoming the New York Highlanders, and have been known as the New York Yankees since 1913.

Baltimore's owners felt that AL president Ban Johnson was hurting the team's fortunes. When John McGraw left the Orioles for the New York Giants of the National League (NL), Mahon and his co-owners supported McGraw. In the meantime, Mahon purchased McGraw's shares in the Orioles.

With the team in financial straits, reportedly owing $12,000 ($446,538 in current dollar terms), Mahon purchased shares in the team from players John McGraw, Joe Kelley, and Wilbert Robinson, becoming principal shareholder of the Orioles. Mahon then sold controlling interest in the Orioles to Andrew Freedman, principal owner of the Giants, and John T. Brush, principal owner of the Cincinnati Reds, on July 17. In the day they owned the franchise, Freedman released the best players on the Orioles from their contracts so that they could be signed by National League teams: Kelley and Cy Seymour signed with the Reds, while McGraw, Joe McGinnity, Roger Bresnahan, Dan McGann, and Jack Cronin signed with the Giants. Johnson, along with Orioles minority owners, took control of the Orioles franchise, which had to forfeit their game that day as they did not have enough players.

== Personal life ==
Mahon was the father-in-law of Joe Kelley, a major league outfielder between 1891 and 1908. Mahon died in his home city in 1928, having been married twice, and was survived by several children.
