= Baltimore Orioles (1901–1902) =

Defunct Major League Baseball team

Information
- League: American League (1901–1902)
- Ballpark: Oriole Park (1901–1902)
- Established: 1901
- Folded: 1902
- World Series championships: None
- American League pennant: None
- Colors: Black and Orange (1901), Blue and White (1902)
- Retired numbers: None
- Ownership: John Mahon (1902); Andrew Freedman (1902); Ban Johnson (1902); Sydney Frank (1901)
- Manager: John McGraw (1901–1902); Wilbert Robinson (1902)

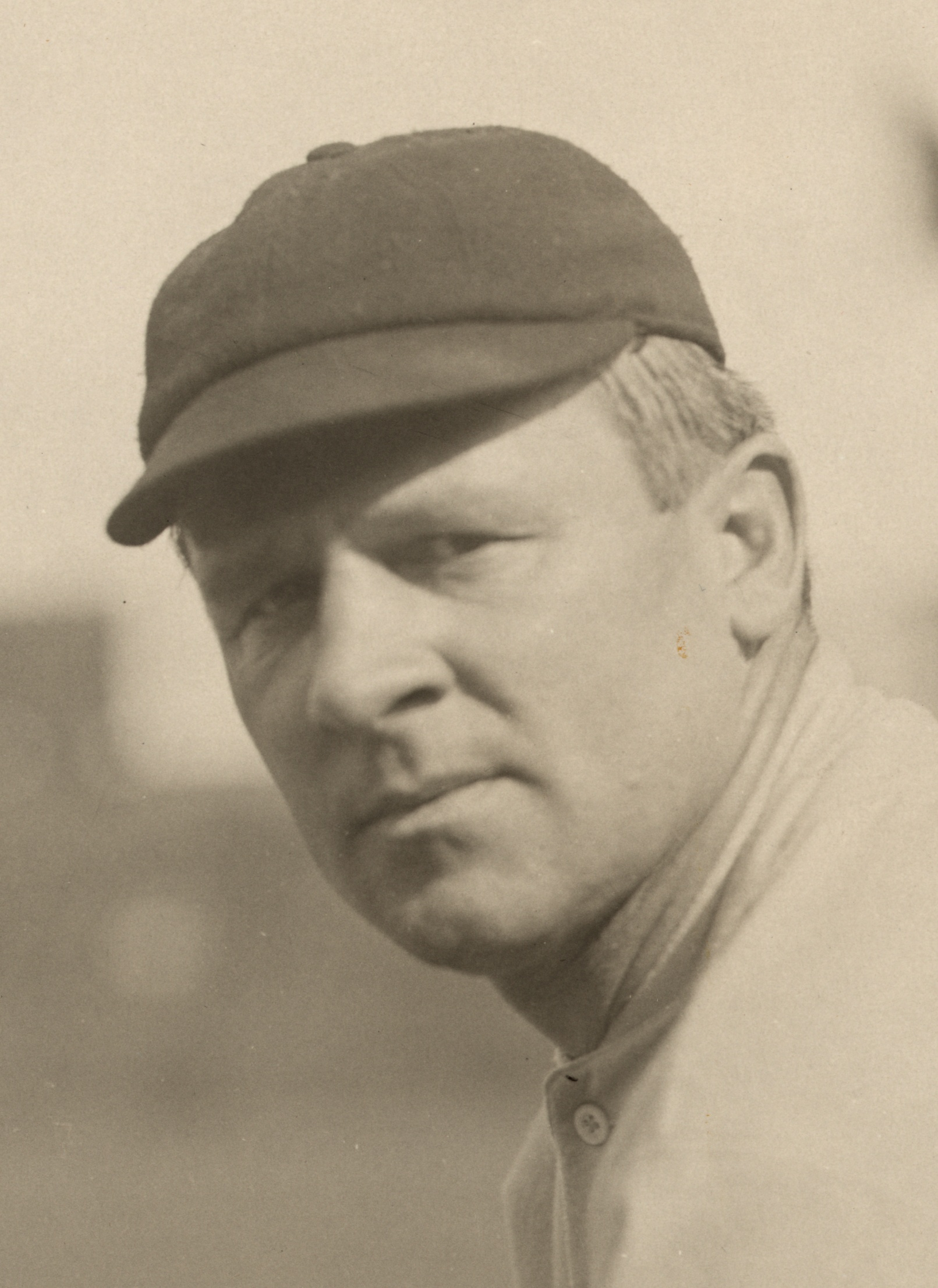
John McGraw was the first manager of the Baltimore Orioles, and had an ownership interest.

The Baltimore Orioles were a Major League Baseball team that played in Baltimore from 1901 to 1902. A charter member of the American League (AL), the team only lasted two seasons before folding after the 1902 season. The team was replaced the following season with the New York Highlanders, known since 1913 as the New York Yankees.

== Before 1901 ==
At the end of the 1900 baseball season, the Western League was positioned by its president, Ban Johnson, as a new major league that would compete with the established National League (NL). The league was reorganized and renamed the American League (AL), and eight cities fielded teams in the 1901 season. Johnson wanted one of these eight teams to be in New York City, however the politically powerful New York Giants had successfully prevented the AL from doing so; Johnson instead placed the would-be New York franchise in Baltimore. A Baltimore team had previously played in the NL through the 1899 season, after which the club was shut down by the league. Baltimore was one of three former NL cities where the AL placed teams in an effort to reach underserved fans. The new Orioles' first manager was John McGraw, who had held the same position for the previous Baltimore team in 1899; McGraw also held an ownership stake. The team was incorporated as the "Baltimore Baseball and Athletic Company."

== 1901–1902 ==
In 1901, their first season, the Orioles had a 68–65 win–loss record and finished in fifth place in the AL. During the season, there were numerous disputes between Johnson and McGraw over disciplinary issues, which continued into the following year. Rumors began to spread that Johnson was interested in relocating the team to New York City, in an attempt to compete directly with the NL. On July 16, 1902, McGraw left the Orioles and joined the New York Giants as their manager; he transferred his interest in the Baltimore team to the Giants as part of the deal. Several Orioles—including Roger Bresnahan and Joe McGinnity—joined the Giants after McGraw's departure, and the Giants gained a majority of the Orioles' stock. The league managed to take back control of the team from the Giants; after the Orioles forfeited a game against the St. Louis Browns the following day because they lacked enough active players, Johnson ordered that the team be "restocked with players essentially given away by the other teams in order to play out the schedule", according to author Marty Appel. The Orioles finished last in the league both in the standings and in attendance. The Orioles were disbanded following the end of the season.

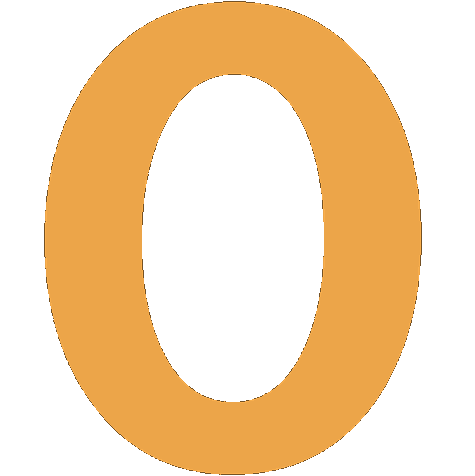
Baltimore Orioles logo 1900-1901

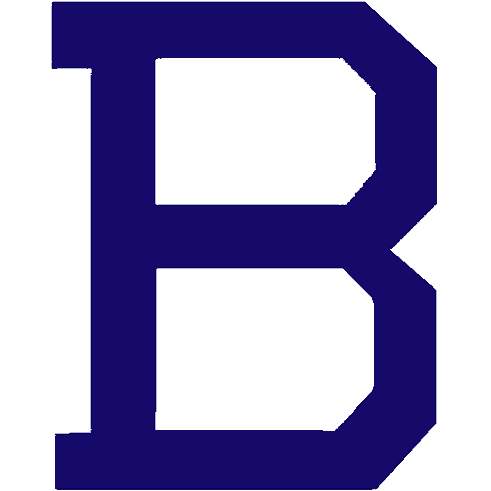
Baltimore Orioles logo 1902

== Legacy ==
The AL and NL signed an agreement after the 1902 season that ended the leagues' battles for players, which had led to increasing salaries. Johnson sought the right to locate an AL team in New York City, which was granted as part of the leagues' peace agreement. The agreement was put to a vote, and 15 of the 16 major league owners agreed on it. Johnson's initial intentions for the team to play in Manhattan was opposed by Giants owner John T. Brush and former owner Andrew Freedman, who were connected to the city's Tammany Hall political organization. They blocked several potential stadium locations, before a pair of Tammany Hall politicians, Frank J. Farrell and William Stephen Devery, purchased the New York franchise in the AL. The pair paid US$18,000 for the team. This was the last change in the lineup of MLB teams for half a century.

It is not clear whether Farrell and Devery purchased the remains of the Orioles and moved them to New York, or if they received an expansion franchise. According to Appel, the Orioles seasons were included in Yankees history by many historians. Baseball-Reference.com included the 1901 and 1902 Orioles in its statistics for the Yankees until 2014, when it decided to separate the two years from the subsequent New York-based seasons. Official MLB historian John Thorn supported the change, citing the new ownership, high roster turnover, and AL takeover of the Orioles. The Yankees do not count the Orioles years as part of their history.

Major League Baseball did not return to Baltimore until 1954, when Bill Veeck sold the St. Louis Browns to Baltimore natives, attorney Clarence Miles and president of the National Brewing Company, Jerold Hoffberger. The Miles-Hoffberger group moved the team from St. Louis to Baltimore, returning major-league baseball to the city after 52 years. In consideration of prior "Baltimore Orioles" baseball teams, the franchise was renamed the Baltimore Orioles. This latest iteration of the Baltimore Orioles continues to play as a member of the American League.

== Baseball Hall of Famers ==
Baltimore Orioles Hall of Famers
| Inductee | Position | Tenure | Inducted |
|---|---|---|---|
| Joe Kelley | OF | 1902 | 1971 |
| Joe McGinnity | P | 1901–1902 | 1946 |
| John McGraw | 3B / Manager | 1901–1902 | 1937 |
| Roger Bresnahan | C / OF / 3B | 1901–1902 | 1945 |
| Wilbert Robinson | C / Manager | 1901–1902 | 1945 |
