= 1901 Boston Americans season =

Major League Baseball season

1901 Boston Americans
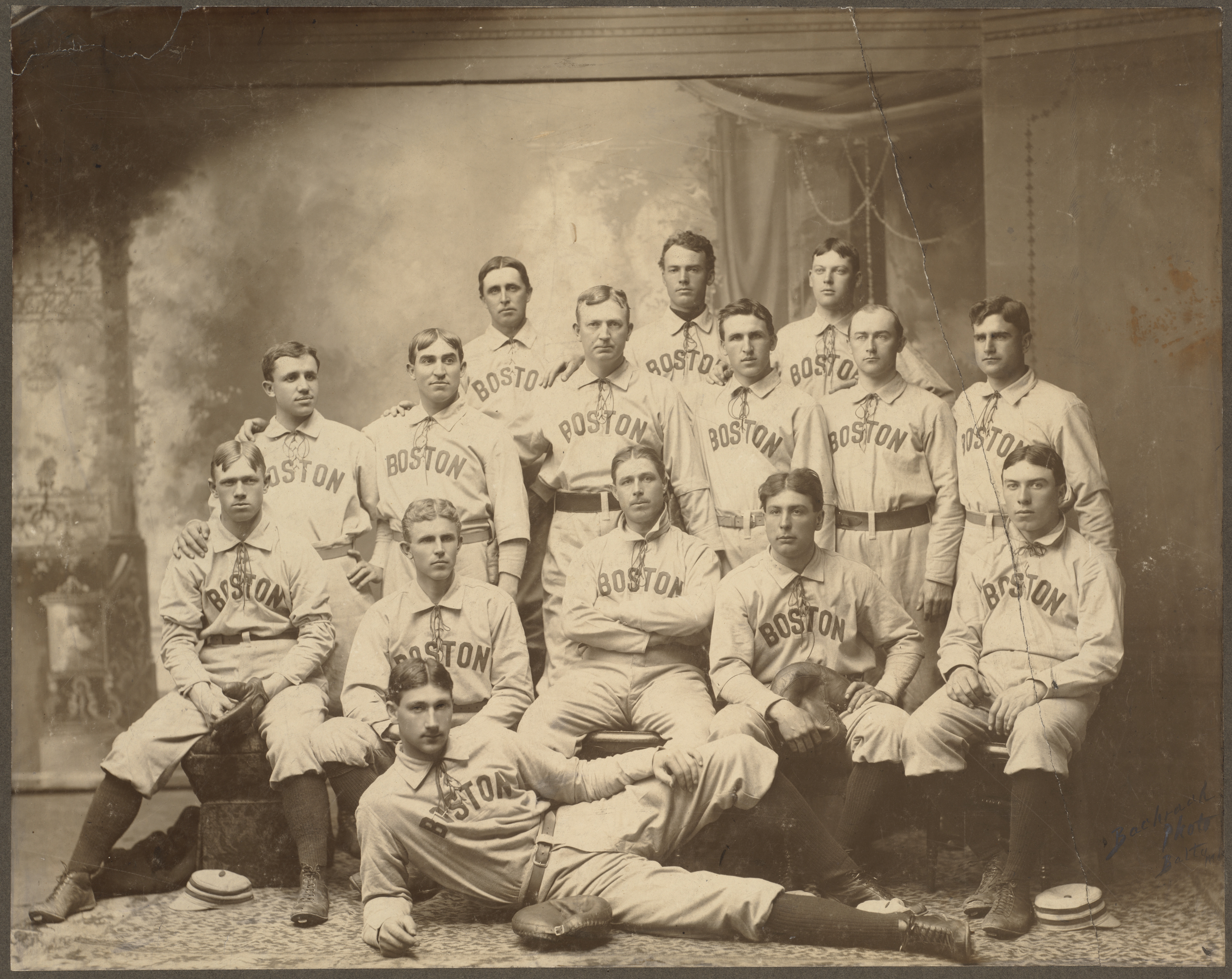
- Team photo; Cy Young third from left in middle row, Jimmy Collins seated center of front row
- League: American League
- Ballpark: Huntington Avenue Grounds
- City: Boston, Massachusetts
- Record: 79–57 (.581)
- League place: 2nd
- Owners: Charles Somers
- President: Charles Somers
- Managers: Jimmy Collins
- Stats: ESPN.com; Baseball Reference

The 1901 Boston Americans season was the first season for the professional baseball franchise that later became known as the Boston Red Sox, and the first season of play for the American League (AL). It resulted in the Americans finishing second in the AL with a record of 79 wins and 57 losses, four games behind the Chicago White Stockings. The team was managed by Jimmy Collins and played its home games at Huntington Avenue Grounds.

== Off-Season ==
On February 11, Jimmy Collins, third baseman for the National League Boston Beaneaters became the first player under contract for the Boston Americans after being offered a contract of $4000 with the added ability to sign subsequent players to contracts. Collins was joined on March 4 by the outfielder Chick Stahl, who was also from the Beaneaters. Defecting with Stahl and Collins was the outfielder Buck Freeman.

Yet perhaps the most important signing was that of the 34 year old St. Louis Cardinals pitcher Cy Young, who accepted a contract worth $3500 from the Boston Americans. Vital to the signing of Cy Young from the Cardinals was the signing of Cy Young's catcher in St. Louis, Lou Criger; the value that Young gave to Criger and that Criger gave to Young was so strong, that it is unlikely that Young would have signed for the Americans if Criger had not done so.

=== Transactions ===
- March 4, 1901: Chick Stahl and Bill Dinneen defect from the Boston Nationals to play for the Boston Americans, with the later agreeing to play for $3600.
- March 6, 1901: Outfielder Charlie Hemphill joins the Americans from the Kansas City Blues.
- March 16, 1901: Infielder Fred Parent signs a contract to play for the Boston Americans.

== Regular season ==
Prior to the regular season, the team held spring training in Charlottesville, Virginia.

- April 26: The franchise's first-ever American League contest ends as a 10–6 loss to the Baltimore Orioles at Oriole Park in Baltimore. Pitching for the Red Sox was Win Kellum, who became the first Red Sox player to pitch a complete game, but was also the first pitcher to earn a loss. Boston's first run was scored by player-manager Jimmy Collins in the fifth inning. In 1903, the Orioles relocated to New York City as the Highlanders, then in 1913 became known as the New York Yankees.
- April 30: After losing their first three games, the team records its first win, an 8–6 victory in 10 innings over the Philadelphia Athletics at Columbia Park in Philadelphia. Cy Young was the winning pitcher.
- May 2: In their highest-scoring game of the year, Boston defeats Philadelphia, 23–12 in a road victory. This game was also the first game played by the Wales-born pitcher Ted Lewis, who pitched a complete game, becoming the first person born outside of North America to play for the Red Sox.
- May 8: The team plays and wins its first-ever home game, 12–4 over the visiting Athletics.
- May 11: Buck Freeman receives the first ejection in franchise history, sent off by umpire Jack Haskell following a call at second base, in a home loss to the Washington Senators.
- May 17: The team's longest losing streak of the season, five games between May 11 and 16, comes to an end with a victory over the visiting Orioles.
- June 10: A 7–4 win over the visiting Milwaukee Brewers gives the team a winning record for the first time, as they reach 17–16. In 1902, the Brewers moved and became the St. Louis Browns, then in 1954 moved again and became today's Baltimore Orioles.
- June 24: The team's longest winning streak of the season, nine games between June 14 and 22, comes to an end with a loss to the visiting Cleveland Blues.
- June 30: The team's 20–5 (.800) record during June establishes a franchise record for highest winning percentage for a month; it was later equalled when the 1950 Red Sox were 24–6 (.800) during August, and was finally surpassed when the 2026 Red Sox were 21–4 (.840) during July.
- August 27: The team's longest game of the season ends as a 2–1 win in 15 innings over the visiting Detroit Tigers.
- September 28: The season ends with a home doubleheader against the Brewers; Boston wins both games, 8–3, and 10–9 in seven innings.

The total attendance for the Red Sox was 289,448, the second most in the American League (behind the White Sox' 354,350) and more than the crosstown Boston Beaneaters' 146,502.

=== Transactions and Signings ===
- April 27, 1901: The Boston Americans sign pitcher Frank Foreman.
- May 16, 1901: Pitcher Frank Foreman is dropped from the roster.
- June 25, 1901: Pitcher Win Kellum is released from the Americans alongside outfielder Charlie Jones.
- August 31, 1901: The Red Sox release pitcher George Cuppy.

=== Statistical leaders ===
The offense was led by Buck Freeman, who hit 12 home runs and had 114 RBIs while recording a .339 batting average. The pitching staff was led by Cy Young, who made 43 appearances (41 starts) and pitched 38 complete games with a 33–10 record and 1.62 ERA, while striking out 158 in 371 1/3 innings.

=== Season Log ===
Boston Win	Boston Loss	Tie Game

1901 Boston Americans Season Log: 79─57─2
April: 1─3

#	Date	Opponent	Score	Win	Loss	Record	Source
1	April 26	@ Baltimore	6-10	McGinnity (1–0)	Kellum (0–1)	0-1	
2	April 27	@ Baltimore	6-12	Howell (1–0)	Young (0–1)	0-2	
3	April 29	@ Baltimore	5-8	Bernhard (1–0)	Cuppy (0–1)	0-3	
4	April 30	@ Philadelphia	8-6	Young (1-1)	Milligan (0–1)	1-3	

May: 10─11

#	Date	Opponent	Score	Win	Loss	Record	Source
5	May 1	@Philadelphia	1-14	Piatt (1-1)	Kellum (0–2)	1-4	
6	May 2	@Philadelphia	23-12	Lewis (1–0)	Loos (0–1)	2-4	
7	May 3	@Washington	4-9	Carrick (3–0)	Foreman (0–1)	2-5	
8	May 4	@Washington	10-2	Young (2–1)	Mercer (1–2)	3-5	
9	May 6	@Washington	9-5	Lewis (2–0)	Lee (1-1)	4-5	
10	May 7	@Washington	7-3	Kellum (1–2)	Carrick (3–1)	5-5	
11	May 8	Philadelphia	4-12	Young (3–1)	Bernhard (1-1)	6-5	
12	May 9	Philadelphia	3-9	Cuppy (1-1)	Fraser (2-2)	7-5	
13	May 11	Washington	3-2	Lee (2–1)	Lewis (2–1)	7-6	
14	May 13	Washington	5-2	Carrick (4–1)	Kellum (1–3)	7-7	
15	May 14	Washington	3-2	Gear (1-1)	Young (3–2)	7-8	
16	May 15	Washington	4-0	Lee (3–1)	Cuppy (1–2)	7-9	
17	May 16	Baltimore	8-7	McGinnity (6–1)	Lewis (2-2)	7-10	
18	May 17	Baltimore	2-7	Young (4–2)	Dunn (1–2)	8-10	
19	May 22	@Detroit	9-5	Lewis (3–2)	Siever (4–3)	9-10	
20	May 23	@Detroit	4-2	Young (5–2)	Cronin (3-3)	10-10	
21	May 23	@Detroit	0-3	Miller (2–1)	Beville (0–1)	10-11	
22	May 25	@Cleveland	5-0	Lewis (4–2)	Moore (3-3)	11-11	
23	May 30	@Chicago	3-8	Griffith (7–1)	Beville (0–2)	11-12	
24	May 30	@Chicago	3-5	Patterson (4–2)	Young (5–3)	11-13	
25	May 31	@Chicago	5-10	Skopec (6–3)	Lewis (4–3)	11-14	

June: 20─5

#	Date	Opponent	Score	Win	Loss	Record	Source
26	June 1	@Chicago	10-5	Mitchell (1–0)	Harvey (2-2)	12-14	
27	June 2	@Milwaukee	13-2	Young (6–3)	Reidy (4-4)	13-14	
28	June 3	@Milwaukee	2-4	Sparks (3-3)	Lewis (4-4)	13-15	
29	June 4	@Milwaukee	2-5	Hawley (3–4)	Cuppy (1–3)	13-16	
30	June 5	@Milwaukee	7-4	Mitchell (2–0)	Garvin (1–5)	14-16	
31	June 7	Milwaukee	2-4	Young (7–3)	Reidy (4–5)	15-16	
32	June 8	Milwaukee	4-12	Lewis (5–4)	Sparks (3–4)	16-16	
33	June 10	Milwaukee	4-7	Kellum (2–3)	Hawley (3–5)	17-16	
34	June 11	Milwaukee	4-8	Cuppy (2–3)	Reidy (4–6)	18-16	
35	June 12	Detroit	2-4	Young (8–3)	Siever (6–4)	19-16	
36	June 13	Detroit	11-6	Miller (5-5)	Lewis (5-5)	19-17	
37	June 14	Detroit	7-16	Young (9–3)	Cronin (6–4)	20-17	
38	June 15	Detroit	4-12	Winter (1–0)	Owen (1–2)	21-17	
39	June 17 (1)	Chicago	1-11	Mitchell (3–0)	Katoll (6–3)	22-17	
40	June 17 (2)	Chicago	4-10	Young (10–3)	Patterson (5-5)	23-17	
41	June 18	Chicago	3-4	Lewis (6–5)	Griffith (9–4)	24-17	
42	June 19	Chicago	3-5	Winter (2–0)	Patterson (5–6)	25-17	
43	June 20	Chicago	3-4	Young (11–3)	Harvey (2–4)	26-17	
44	June 21	Cleveland	3-4	Lewis (7–5)	Dowling (4–5)	27-17	
45	June 22	Cleveland	1-8	Winter (3–0)	Hart (3–9)	28-17	
46	June 24	Cleveland	7-1	Moore (6–5)	Mitchell (3–1)	28-18	
47	June 25	Cleveland	2-4	Young (12–3)	Dowling (4–6)	29-18	
48	June 27	@Washington	0-2	Lee (9–5)	Lewis (7–6)	29-19	
49	June 28	@Washington	6-5	Winter (4–0)	Carrick (8–5)	30-19	
50	June 29	@Washington	7-2	Young (13–3)	Patten (4–1)	31-19	

July: 16─12

#	Date	Opponent	Score	Win	Loss	Record	Source
51	July 1	@Baltimore	5-7	Nops (3–0)	Cuppy (2–4)	31-20	
52	July 2	@Baltimore	10-8	Winter (5–0)	McGinnity (12–8)	32-20	
53	July 3	Baltimore	1-9	Young (14–3)	Howell	33-20	
54	July 4 (1)	Baltimore	2-10	Mitchell (4–1)	Nops (3–1)	34-20	
55	July 4 (2)	Baltimore	3-8	Lewis (8–6)	Foreman (3–2)	35-20	
56	July 5	Washington	1-2	Winter (6–0)	Patten (5–2)	36-20	
57	July 6	Washington	0-7	Young (15–3)	Lee (9–6)	37-20	
58	July 8	Washington	1-3	Cuppy (3–4)	Carrick (8–7)	38-20	
59	July 10	Philadelphia	13-6	Fraser (7–10)	Lewis (8–7)	38-21	
60	July 11	Philadelphia	1-4	Winter (7–0)	Plank (7–6)	39-21	
61	July 12	Philadelphia	3-5	Young (16–3)	McPherson (0–1)	40-21	
62	July 13	@Philadelphia	1-6	Fraser (8–10)	Mitchell (4–2)	40-22	
63	July 15	@Philadelphia	1-6	Plank (8–6)	Winter (7–1)	40-23	
64	July 16	@Cleveland	10-8	Young (17–3)	Moore (8-8)	41-23	
65	July 17 (1)	@Cleveland	9-3	Lewis (9–7)	Scott (4–6)	42-23	
66	July 17 (2)	@Cleveland	10-2	Cuppy (4-4)	Dowling (6–12)	43-23	
67	July 18	@Cleveland	5-6	Hart (6–10)	Winter (7–2)	43-24	
68	July 19	@Cleveland	1-2	Moore (9–8)	Young (17–4)	43-25	
69	July 20	@Detroit	6-8	Siever (9-9)	Lewis (9–8)	43-26	
70	July 21	@Detroit	4-3	Winter (8–2)	Yeager (4-4)	44-26	
71	July 22	@Detroit	5-6	Miller (13–6)	Young (17–5)	44-27	
72	July 23	@Milwaukee	9-7	Mitchell (5–2)	Husting (3–5)	45-27	
73	July 24	@Milwaukee	3-4	Hawley (5–12)	Lewis (9-9)	45-28	
74	July 25	@Milwaukee	2-6	Reidy (4-4)	Winter (8–3)	45-29	
75	July 26	@Milwaukee	4-2	Young (18–5)	Husting (3–6)	46-29	
76	July 27	@Chicago	7-8	Callahan (8–0)	Lewis (9–10)	46-30	
77	July 29	@Chicago	4-1	Young (19–5)	Patterson (10-10)	47-30	
78	July 31	@Philadelphia	10-13	Fraser (12–11)	Winter (8–4)	47-31	

August: 17─14─1

#	Date	Opponent	Score	Win	Loss	Record	Source
79	August 1	@Philadelphia	6-8	Wiltse (2–4)	Cuppy (4–5)	47-32	
80	August 2	@Philadelphia	16-0	Young (20–5)	Bernhard (6-6)	48-32	
81	August 3	@Philadelphia	4-7	Plank (12–7)	Lewis (9–11)	48-33	
82	August 5 (1)	@Baltimore	3-1	Young (21–5)	Howell (9–13)	49-33	
83	August 5 (2)	@Baltimore	0-9	Nops (9–2)	Winter (8–5)	49-34	
84	August 7 (1)	@Baltimore	10-5	Lewis (10–11)	Foreman (7–4)	50-34	
85	August 7 (2)	@Baltimore	4-10	McGinnity (19–12)	Cuppy (4–6)	50-35	
86	August 8	Baltimore	2-0	Howell (10–13)	Young (21–6)	50-36	
87	August 9 (1)	Baltimore	11-9	Nops (10–2)	Winter (8–6)	50-37	
88	August 9 (2)	Baltimore	6-2	Mitchell (6–2)	McGinnity (19–13)	51-37	
89	August 10 (1)	Baltimore	4-6	Lewis (11-11)	Howell (10–14)	52-37	
90	August 10 (2)	Baltimore	4-3	Foreman (8–4)	Young (21–7)	52-38	
91	August 12 (1)	Philadelphia	0-6	Winter (9–6)	Bernhard (8–7)	53-38	
92	August 12 (2)	Philadelphia	7-1	Plank (14–8)	Mitchell (6–3)	53-39	
93	August 13	Philadelphia	3-4	Lewis (12–11)	Wiltse (5-5)	54-39	
94	August 14 (1)	Philadelphia	9-0	Fraser (15–12)	Young (21–8)	54-40	
95	August 14 (2)	Philadelphia	2-4	Winter (10–6)	Plank (14–9)	55-40	
96	August 16	Chicago	2-6	Young (22–8)	Callahan (9–4)	56-40	
97	August 17	Chicago	2-4	Lewis (13–11)	Griffith (21–6)	57-40	
98	August 19	Milwaukee	5-6	Winter (11–6)	Husting (5–9)	58-40	
99	August 20	Milwaukee	0-6	Young (23–8)	Hawley (7–14)	59-40	
100	August 21	Milwaukee	5-8	Lewis (14–11)	Garvin (5–13)	60-40	
101	August 22	Cleveland	3-4	Winter (12–6)	Moore (11–12)	61-40	
102	August 23	Cleveland	3-4	Young (24–8)	McNeal (3–2)	62-40	
103	August 24	Cleveland	4-2	Dowling (9–18)	Lewis (14–12)	62-41	
104	August 26	Detroit	6-3	Siever (13–12)	Winter (12–7)	62-42	
105	August 27	Detroit	1-2	Young (25–8)	Miller (18–10)	63-42	
106	August 28	Detroit	4-2	Yeager (8–9)	Lewis (14–13)	63-43	
107	August 29	@Detroit	3-5	Siever (14–12)	Winter (12–8)	63-44	
108	August 30	@Detroit	5-4	Young (26–8)	Cronin (9–14)	64-44	
109	August 31 (1)	@Detroit	5-6	Miller (19–10)	Mitchell (6–4)	64-45	
110	August 31 (2)	@Detroit	4-4	─	─	64-45-1	

September: 15─12─1

#	Date	Opponent	Score	Win	Loss	Record	Source
111	September 2 (1)	@Cleveland	9-4	Winter (13–8)	Dowling (9-21)	65-45-1	
112	September 2 (2)	@Cleveland	4-1	Young (27–8)	Bracken (3–4)	66-45-1	
113	September 3 (1)	@Cleveland	0-1	Moore (13-13)	Lewis (14-14)	66-46-1	
114	September 3 (2)	@Cleveland	0-4	Cristall (1–0)	Mitchell (6–5)	66-47-1	
115	September 4	@Milwaukee	4-6	Reidy (15–14)	Winter (13–9)	66-48-1	
116	September 5	@Milwaukee	4-2	Young (28–8)	Garvin (6–16)	67-48-1	
117	September 7	@Chicago	1-4	Callahan (12–7)	Lewis (14–15)	67-49-1	
118	September 8	@Chicago	3-4	Patterson (19–13)	Young (28–9)	67-50-1	
119	September 9 (1)	@Chicago	3-4	Callahan (13–7)	Lewis (14–16)	67-51-1	
120	September 9 (2)	@Chicago	4-6	Griffith (23–6)	Winter (13–10)	67-52-1	
121	September 11	@Washington	9-0	Young (29–9)	Mercer (8–10)	68-52-1	
122	September 12	@Washington	6-6	─	─	68-52-2	
123	September 13 (1)	@Washington	5-1	Winter (14–10)	Carrick (11–21)	69-52-1	
124	September 13 (2)	@Washington	3-5	Lee (16–14)	Mitchell (6-6)	69-53-1	
125	September 14	Washington	1-12	Young (30–9)	Mercer (8–11)	70-53-2	
126	September 16 (1)	Washington	5-6	Young (31–9)	Patten (16–10)	71-53-2	
127	September 16 (2)	Washington	7-5	Carrick (12–21)	Winter (14–11)	71-54-2	
128	September 17	Cleveland	0-5	Young (32–9)	Dowling (11–23)	72-54-2	
129	September 20	Detroit	2-5	Lewis (15–16)	Cronin (13–15)	73-54-2	
130	September 21	Detroit	3-1	Siever (18–13)	Winter (14–12)	73-55-2	
131	September 23 (1)	Detroit	5-4	Yeager (11-11)	Young (32–10)	73-56-2	
132	September 23 (2)	Detroit	9-2	Miller (22–12)	Lewis (15–17)	73-57-2	
133	September 24	Chicago	3-8	Winter (15–12)	Piatt (8–14)	74-57-2	
134	September 25	Chicago	2-5	Young (33–10)	Katoll (11–10)	75-57-2	
135	September 26	Chicago	2-3	Lewis (16–17)	Callahan (15–8)	76-57-2	
136	September 27	Milwaukee	2-7	Prentiss (1–0)	Garvin (8-20)	77-57-2	
137	September 28 (1)	Milwaukee	3-8	Winter (16–12)	Husting (9–15)	78-57-2	
138	September 28 (2)	Milwaukee	9-10	Volz (1–0)	Reidy (16–20)	79-57-2	

=== Season standings ===
American League
Team	W	L	Pct.	GB	Home	Road
Chicago White Stockings	83	53	.610	—	49‍–‍21	34‍–‍32
Boston Americans	79	57	.581	4	49‍–‍20	30‍–‍37
Detroit Tigers	74	61	.548	8½	42‍–‍27	32‍–‍34
Philadelphia Athletics	74	62	.544	9	42‍–‍24	32‍–‍38
Baltimore Orioles	68	65	.511	13½	40‍–‍25	28‍–‍40
Washington Senators	61	72	.459	20½	31‍–‍35	30‍–‍37
Cleveland Blues	54	82	.397	29	28‍–‍39	26‍–‍43
Milwaukee Brewers	48	89	.350	35½	32‍–‍37	16‍–‍52

The team had two games end in a tie; August 31 at Detroit Tigers and September 12 at Washington Senators. Tied games are not counted in league standings, but player statistics during tied games are counted.

== Record vs. opponents ==
1901 American League record Sources:
Team	BAL	BOS	CWS	CLE	DET	MIL	PHA	WSH
Baltimore	—	9–9	4–14–1	11–9	9–10	12–7–1	12–8	11–8
Boston	9–9	—	12–8	12–6	9–11–1	15–5	10–10	12–8–1
Chicago	14–4–1	8–12	—	13–7	10–10	16–4	12–8	10–8
Cleveland	9–11	6–12	7–13	—	6–14	11–9	6–14	9–9–2
Detroit	10–9	11–9–1	10–10	14–6	—	13–7	7–9	9–11
Milwaukee	7–12–1	5–15	4–16	9–11	7–13	—	6–14	10–8–1
Philadelphia	8–12	10–10	8–12	14–6	9–7	14–6	—	11–9–1
Washington	8–11	8–12–1	8–10	9–9–2	11–9	8–10–1	9–11–1	—

=== Opening Day lineup ===
Tommy Dowd	LF
Charlie Hemphill	RF
Chick Stahl	CF
Jimmy Collins	3B
Buck Freeman	1B
Freddy Parent	SS
Hobe Ferris	2B
Lou Criger	C
Win Kellum	P

=== Roster ===
1901 Boston Americans
Roster
Pitchers: Ben Beville; George Cuppy; Frank Foreman; Win Kellum; Ted Lewis; Fred Mitchell; Frank Morrissey; George Prentiss; Jake Volz; George Winter; Cy Young	Catchers: Lou Criger; Ossee Schreckengost; Jack Slattery; Infielders: Jimmy Collins; Hobe Ferris; Buck Freeman; Harry Gleason; Larry McLean; Freddy Parent	Outfielders: Tommy Dowd; Charlie Hemphill; Charlie Jones; Chick Stahl	Manager: Jimmy Collins

== Player stats ==
=== Batting ===
==== Starters by position ====
Note: Pos = Position; G = Games played; AB = At bats; R = Runs; H = Hits; HR = Home runs; RBI = Runs batted in; Avg. = Batting average; OBP = On base percentage; SLG = Slugging percentage

Pos	Player	G	AB	R	H	HR	RBI	Avg.	OBP	SLG	Reference
C	Ossee Schreckengost	86	280	37	85	0	38	.304	.356	.386	
1B	Buck Freeman	129	489	88	166	12	114	.339	.403	.521	
2B	Hobe Ferris	138	524	68	131	2	63	.250	.296	.349	
SS	Freddy Parent	138	519	87	158	4	60	.304	.360	.407	
3B	Jimmy Collins	138	565	108	187	6	94	.331	.375	.494	
OF	Charlie Hemphill	136	545	71	142	3	62	.261	.315	.332	
OF	Chick Stahl	131	515	105	156	6	72	.303	.376	.439	
OF	Tommy Dowd	138	596	104	159	3	52	.267	.317	.336	
─	Total	─	4,028	668	1,184	36	554	.295	.349	.408	─

==== Other batters ====
Note: G = Games played; AB = At bats; R = Runs; H = Hits; HR = Home runs; RBI = Runs batted in; Avg. = Batting average; OBP = On base percentage; SLG = Slugging percentage

Player	G	AB	R	H	HR	RBI	Avg.	OBP	SLG	Reference
Lou Criger	76	269	26	62	0	24	.231	.274	.275	
Charlie Jones	10	41	6	6	0	6	.146	.167	.195	
Larry McLean	9	19	4	4	0	2	.211	.211	.263	
Jack Slattery	1	3	1	1	0	1	.333	.500	.333	
Harry Gleason	1	1	0	1	0	0	1.000	1.000	1.000	
Total	─	332	37	74	0	33	.384	.430	.413	_{─}

==== Pitchers ====
Note: G = Games played; AB = At bats; R = Runs; H = Hits; HR = Home runs; RBI = Runs batted in; Avg. = Batting average; OBP = On base percentage; SLG = Slugging percentage

Player	G	AB	R	H	HR	RBI	Avg.	OBP	SLG	Reference
Cy Young	45	153	20	32	0	17	.209	.239	.288	
Ted Lewis	39	121	14	21	0	10	.174	.225	.207	
George Winter	28	100	7	19	1	6	.190	.198	.220	
Fred Mitchell	20	45	5	7	0	4	.156	.191	.244	
George Cuppy	17	49	4	10	0	6	.204	.250	.265	
Win Kellum	6	18	2	3	0	0	.167	.211	.167	
Ben Beville	3	7	2	2	0	1	.286	.286	.571	
Frank Foreman	1	4	0	0	0	0	.000	.000	.000	
Jake Volz	1	4	0	0	0	0	.000	.000	.000	
George Prentiss	2	3	0	1	0	1	.333	.600	.333	
Frank Morrissey	1	3	0	0	0	0	.000	.000	.000	
Total	─	507	54	95	1	45	.156	.200	.208	─

=== Pitching ===
==== Starting pitchers ====
Note: G = Games pitched; IP = Innings pitched; W = Wins; L = Losses; SV = Saves; ERA = Earned run average; SO = Strikeouts

Player	G	IP	W	L	SV	ERA	SO	Reference
Cy Young	43	371 2/3	33	10	0	1.62	160	
Ted Lewis	39	316 1/3	16	17	1	3.53	112	
George Winter	28	241	16	12	0	2.80	64	
Fred Mitchell	17	108 2/3	6	6	0	3.81	35	
George Cuppy	13	93 1/3	4	6	0	4.15	22	
Win Kellum	6	48	2	3	0	6.38	8	
Ben Beville	2	9	0	2	0	4.00	1	
Frank Foreman	1	8	0	1	0	9.00	1	
Jake Volz	1	7	1	0	0	9.00	5	
Total	─	313	78	57	1	4.92	408	─

==== Other pitchers ====
Note: G = Games pitched; IP = Innings pitched; W = Wins; L = Losses; SV = Saves; ERA = Earned run average; SO = Strikeouts

Player	G	IP	W	L	SV	ERA	SO	Reference
George Prentiss	2	10	1	0	0	1.80	0	

==== Relief pitchers ====
Note: G = Games pitched; W = Wins; L = Losses; SV = Saves; ERA = Earned run average; SO = Strikeouts

Player	G	W	IP	L	SV	ERA	SO	Reference
Frank Morrissey	1	0	4 1/3	0	0	2.08	1	

== League Leaders ==
=== Players ===
Cy Young led the league in ERA (1.62), shutouts (5; tied with Clark Griffith), strikeouts (158), and wins (33).
