= 1901 Milwaukee Brewers season =

Major League Baseball season

1901 Milwaukee Brewers
- League: American League
- Ballpark: Lloyd Street Grounds
- City: Milwaukee, Wisconsin
- Record: 48–89 (.350)
- League place: 8th
- Owners: Henry Killilea
- Managers: Hugh Duffy

The 1901 Milwaukee Brewers were an American professional baseball team. This was the final season of the Milwaukee Brewers team that operated from 1894 to 1901, one of multiple teams in Milwaukee's professional baseball history to use the Brewers nickname, and the only season the team competed at the major-league level.

The Brewers finished eighth in the inaugural season of the American League with a record of 48 wins and 89 losses, 35 1/2 games behind the Chicago White Stockings. After the season, the major-league franchise relocated and became the St. Louis Browns, where they remained through the 1953 season, after which the franchise again relocated and became the Baltimore Orioles. A franchise in the minor-league American Association played in Milwaukee from 1902 through 1952 using the Milwaukee Brewers name.

== Offseason ==
- March 23, 1901: Tom Leahy was signed as a free agent by the Brewers.

== Regular season ==
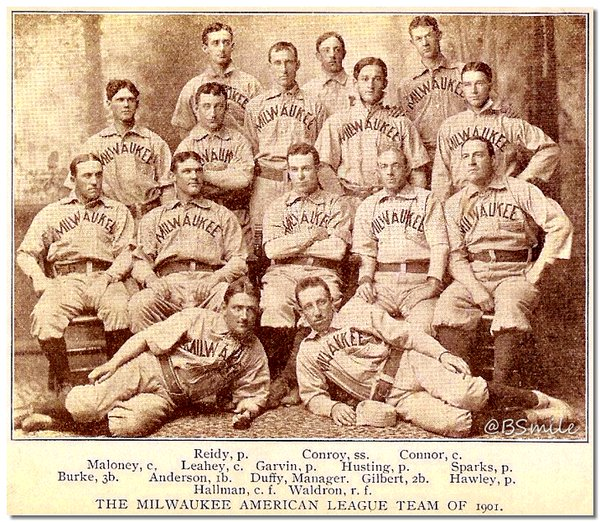
1901 Milwaukee Brewers

=== Regular season highlights ===
4/25/01: In the first game of the season in Detroit, the Brewers held a 13–4 lead going into the ninth inning. The Detroit Tigers scored 10 runs in the bottom of the inning to win, a record which still stands as the greatest ninth inning comeback in major league baseball history.

=== Season standings ===
American League
Team	W	L	Pct.	GB	Home	Road
Chicago White Stockings	83	53	.610	—	49‍–‍21	34‍–‍32
Boston Americans	79	57	.581	4	49‍–‍20	30‍–‍37
Detroit Tigers	74	61	.548	8½	42‍–‍27	32‍–‍34
Philadelphia Athletics	74	62	.544	9	42‍–‍24	32‍–‍38
Baltimore Orioles	68	65	.511	13½	40‍–‍25	28‍–‍40
Washington Senators	61	72	.459	20½	31‍–‍35	30‍–‍37
Cleveland Blues	54	82	.397	29	28‍–‍39	26‍–‍43
Milwaukee Brewers	48	89	.350	35½	32‍–‍37	16‍–‍52

=== Record vs. opponents ===
1901 American League record Sources:
Team	BAL	BOS	CWS	CLE	DET	MIL	PHA	WSH
Baltimore	—	9–9	4–14–1	11–9	9–10	12–7–1	12–8	11–8
Boston	9–9	—	12–8	12–6	9–11–1	15–5	10–10	12–8–1
Chicago	14–4–1	8–12	—	13–7	10–10	16–4	12–8	10–8
Cleveland	9–11	6–12	7–13	—	6–14	11–9	6–14	9–9–2
Detroit	10–9	11–9–1	10–10	14–6	—	13–7	7–9	9–11
Milwaukee	7–12–1	5–15	4–16	9–11	7–13	—	6–14	10–8–1
Philadelphia	8–12	10–10	8–12	14–6	9–7	14–6	—	11–9–1
Washington	8–11	8–12–1	8–10	9–9–2	11–9	8–10–1	9–11–1	—

=== Notable transactions ===
- June 1901: Tom Leahy was released by the Brewers.

=== Roster ===
1901 Milwaukee Brewers
Roster
Pitchers: Pete Dowling; Ned Garvin; Pink Hawley; Bert Husting; Bill Reidy; Tully Sparks	Catchers: John Butler; Joe Connor; Jiggs Donahue; Tom Leahy; Billy Maloney; Infielders: John Anderson; George Bone; Jimmy Burke; Wid Conroy; Bill Friel; Billy Gilbert; George McBride	Outfielders: Ed Bruyette; Hugh Duffy; Phil Geier; Lou Gertenrich; Bill Hallman; George Hogreiver; Davy Jones; Irv Waldron	Manager: Hugh Duffy

== Player stats ==
=== Batting ===
==== Starters by position ====
Note: Pos = Position; G = Games played; AB = At bats; H = Hits; Avg. = Batting average; HR = Home runs; RBI = Runs batted in

Pos	Player	G	AB	H	Avg.	HR	RBI
C	Billy Maloney	86	290	85	.293	0	22
1B	John Anderson	138	576	190	.330	8	99
2B	Billy Gilbert	127	492	133	.270	0	43
SS	Wid Conroy	131	503	129	.256	5	64
3B	Jimmy Burke	64	233	48	.206	0	26
OF	Hugh Duffy	79	285	86	.302	2	45
OF	Bill Hallman	139	549	135	.246	2	47
OF	George Hogreiver	54	221	52	.235	0	16

==== Other batters ====
Note: G = Games played; AB = At bats; H = Hits; Avg. = Batting average; HR = Home runs; RBI = Runs batted in

Player	G	AB	H	Avg.	HR	RBI
Bill Friel	106	376	100	.266	4	35
Irv Waldron	62	266	79	.297	0	29
Jiggs Donahue	37	107	34	.318	0	16
Joe Connor	38	102	28	.275	1	9
Tom Leahy	33	99	24	.242	0	10
Ed Bruyette	26	82	15	.183	0	4
Davy Jones	14	52	9	.173	3	5
George Bone	12	43	13	.302	0	6
Phil Geier	11	39	7	.179	0	1
George McBride	3	12	2	.167	0	0
John Butler	1	3	0	.000	0	0
Lou Gertenrich	2	3	1	.333	0	0

=== Pitching ===
==== Starting pitchers ====
Note: G = Games pitched; IP = Innings pitched; W = Wins; L = Losses; ERA = Earned run average; SO = Strikeouts

Player	G	IP	W	L	ERA	SO
Bill Reidy	37	301.1	16	20	4.21	50
Ned Garvin	37	257.1	8	20	3.46	122
Bert Husting	34	217.1	9	15	4.27	67
Tully Sparks	29	210.0	7	17	3.51	62
Pink Hawley	26	182.1	7	14	4.59	50

==== Other pitchers ====
Note: G = Games pitched; IP = Innings pitched; W = Wins; L = Losses; ERA = Earned run average; SO = Strikeouts

Player	G	IP	W	L	ERA	SO
Pete Dowling	10	49.2	1	3	5.62	25

== See also ==
- History of the Baltimore Orioles
