= List of all-time Major League Baseball win–loss records =

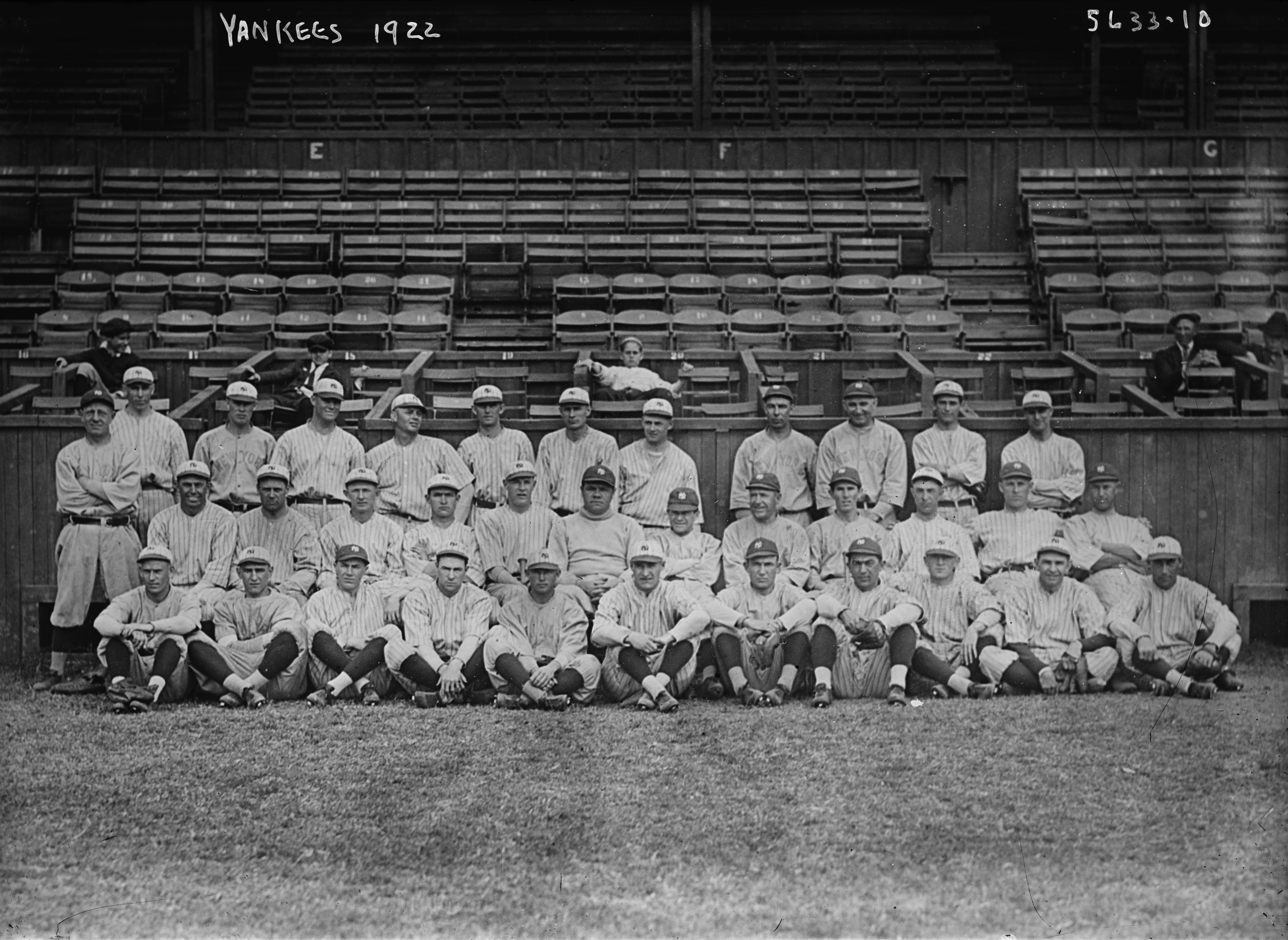
The New York Yankees have the highest all-time regular season win–loss percentage (.570) in Major League Baseball history.

Major League Baseball (MLB) is a professional baseball organization, which consists of a total of 30 teams—15 teams in the National League (NL) and 15 in the American League (AL). The NL and AL were formed in 1876 and 1901, respectively. Beginning in 1903, the two leagues cooperated but remained legally separate entities until 2000 when they merged into a single organization led by the Commissioner of Baseball. This list documents all 30 active MLB teams ranked by win–loss percentage as of the completion of the 2025 Major League Baseball season. These records do not include results from a team's playing time in the National Association of Professional Base Ball Players or while members of any minor league.

The New York Yankees have the highest regular-season winning percentage, with a .570. The Colorado Rockies have the lowest, with .453. The San Francisco Giants have the most overall wins (11,687), while the Arizona Diamondbacks have the fewest (2,253). The Philadelphia Phillies have the most losses, with 11,466, while the Tampa Bay Rays have the fewest, with 2,328. With 22,579 games played, the Chicago Cubs have played more games than any other MLB club. Conversely, the Tampa Bay Rays have played the fewest (4,594). San Francisco has recorded the most ties in MLB history, with 163. Tie games do not count toward MLB standings, and they have become scarce since the advent of a 2007 rule change assuring that a tie game can occur only if it is the last scheduled matchup between the two teams that season and has no bearing on the postseason.

As of the completion of the 2026 Major League Baseball postseason, the Miami Marlins have the highest postseason winning percentage, with .600, while the Minnesota Twins have the lowest, with .379. With 449 games played, the New York Yankees have played more games than any other MLB club in the postseason. Conversely, the Colorado Rockies have played the fewest (24) in postseason history. The New York Yankees have the most postseason wins (257), while the Colorado Rockies have the fewest (10). The Yankees also have the most postseason losses (188), while Colorado has the fewest (14).

== Table key ==
| Division | Division in which each team currently competes |
| * | Best win-loss record among teams currently in that division (disregarding former division memberships) |

== Regular season ==
Last updated on September 27, 2026.

Regular season win–loss records
| Rank | Team | Games | Won | Lost | Tied | Win % | First MLB season | Division |
|---|---|---|---|---|---|---|---|---|
| 1 | New York Yankees | 19,337 | 10,965 | 8,284 | 88 | .570 | 1903 | AL East* |
| 2 | San Francisco Giants | 22,047 | 11,687 | 10,197 | 163 | .534 | 1883 | NL West* |
| 3 | Los Angeles Dodgers | 21,963 | 11,625 | 10,199 | 139 | .533 | 1884 | NL West |
| 4 | St. Louis Cardinals | 22,163 | 11,440 | 10,571 | 152 | .520 | 1882 | NL Central* |
| 5 | Boston Red Sox | 19,625 | 10,131 | 9,411 | 83 | .518 | 1901 | AL East |
| 6 | Chicago Cubs | 22,579 | 11,508 | 10,910 | 161 | .513 | 1876 | NL Central |
| 7 | Cleveland Guardians | 19,636 | 10,025 | 9,520 | 91 | .513 | 1901 | AL Central* |
| 8 | Atlanta Braves | 22,541 | 11,284 | 11,103 | 154 | .504 | 1876 | NL East* |
| 9 | Cincinnati Reds | 22,163 | 11,092 | 10,932 | 139 | .504 | 1882 | NL Central |
| 10 | Detroit Tigers | 19,660 | 9,839 | 9,728 | 93 | .503 | 1901 | AL Central |
| 11 | Houston Astros | 10,303 | 5,177 | 5,121 | 5 | .503 | 1962 | AL West* |
| 12 | Pittsburgh Pirates | 22,122 | 10,992 | 10,990 | 140 | .500 | 1882 | NL Central |
| 13 | Toronto Blue Jays | 7,876 | 3,934 | 3,939 | 3 | .500 | 1977 | AL East |
| 14 | Chicago White Sox | 19,633 | 9,738 | 9,792 | 103 | .499 | 1901 | AL Central |
| 15 | Tampa Bay Rays | 4,594 | 2,266 | 2,328 | 0 | .493 | 1998 | AL East |
| 16 | Los Angeles Angels | 10,463 | 5,155 | 5,305 | 3 | .493 | 1961 | AL West |
| 17 | Milwaukee Brewers | 9,166 | 4,508 | 4,654 | 4 | .492 | 1969 | NL Central |
| 18 | Arizona Diamondbacks | 4,596 | 2,253 | 2,343 | 0 | .490 | 1998 | NL West |
| 19 | Athletics | 19,599 | 9,469 | 10,043 | 87 | .485 | 1901 | AL West |
| 20 | New York Mets | 10,296 | 4,973 | 5,315 | 8 | .483 | 1962 | NL East |
| 21 | Minnesota Twins | 19,647 | 9,406 | 10,132 | 109 | .481 | 1901 | AL Central |
| 22 | Washington Nationals | 9,162 | 4,408 | 4,750 | 4 | .481 | 1969 | NL East |
| 23 | Seattle Mariners | 7,875 | 3,765 | 4,108 | 2 | .478 | 1977 | AL West |
| 24 | Texas Rangers | 10,450 | 4,979 | 5,465 | 6 | .477 | 1961 | AL West |
| 25 | Kansas City Royals | 9,157 | 4,359 | 4,796 | 2 | .476 | 1969 | AL Central |
| 26 | Philadelphia Phillies | 21,972 | 10,391 | 11,466 | 115 | .475 | 1883 | NL East |
| 27 | Baltimore Orioles | 19,637 | 9,274 | 10,253 | 110 | .475 | 1901 | AL East |
| 28 | San Diego Padres | 9,170 | 4,308 | 4,860 | 2 | .470 | 1969 | NL West |
| 29 | Miami Marlins | 5,336 | 2,462 | 2,874 | 0 | .461 | 1993 | NL East |
| 30 | Colorado Rockies | 5,344 | 2,422 | 2,922 | 0 | .453 | 1993 | NL West |

== Postseason ==
Postseason Win–loss records
| Rank | Team | Games | Won | Lost | Win % | Last appearance | Division |
|---|---|---|---|---|---|---|---|
| 1 | Miami Marlins | 40 | 24 | 16 | .600 | 2023 | NL East* |
| 2 | New York Yankees | 449 (Note: Includes a tied Game 2 of the 1922 World Series) | 257 | 191 | .572 | 2026 | AL East* |
| 3 | New York Mets | 105 | 59 | 46 | .562 | 2024 | NL East |
| 4 | Boston Red Sox | 202 (Note: Includes a tied Game 2 of the 1912 World Series) | 109 | 92 | .540 | 2025 | AL East |
| 5 | Kansas City Royals | 80 | 43 | 37 | .538 | 2024 | AL Central* |
| 6 | Baltimore Orioles | 103 | 54 | 49 | .524 | 2024 | AL East |
| 7 | Washington Nationals | 46 | 24 | 22 | .522 | 2019 | NL East |
| 8 | Cincinnati Reds | 91 | 47 | 44 | .516 | 2025 | NL Central* |
| 9 | Houston Astros | 163 | 83 | 80 | .509 | 2026 | AL West* |
| 10 | San Francisco Giants | 195 | 100 | 93 | .513 | 2021 | NL West* |
| 11 | St. Louis Cardinals | 262 | 134 | 128 | .511 | 2022 | NL Central |
| 12 | Oakland Athletics | 167 | 85 | 82 | .509 | 2020 | AL West |
| 13 | Philadelphia Phillies | 143 | 71 | 72 | .497 | 2026 | NL East |
| 14 | Cleveland Guardians | 142 | 70 | 72 | .493 | 2026 | AL Central |
| 15 | Chicago White Sox | 69 | 34 | 35 | .493 | 2026 | AL Central |
| 16 | Texas Rangers | 69 | 34 | 35 | .493 | 2023 | AL West |
| 17 | Los Angeles Dodgers | 317 | 156 | 161 | .492 | 2026 | NL West |
| 18 | Arizona Diamondbacks | 57 | 28 | 29 | .491 | 2023 | NL West |
| 19 | Detroit Tigers | 135 (Note: Includes a tied Game 1 of the 1907 World Series) | 66 | 68 | .489 | 2025 | AL Central |
| 20 | Toronto Blue Jays | 85 | 41 | 43 | .488 | 2025 | AL East |
| 21 | Atlanta Braves | 228 | 111 | 117 | .487 | 2026 | NL East |
| 22 | Milwaukee Brewers | 76 | 36 | 40 | .474 | 2026 | NL Central |
| 23 | Tampa Bay Rays | 78 | 36 | 42 | .462 | 2026 | AL East |
| 24 | Seattle Mariners | 51 | 23 | 28 | .451 | 2025 | AL West |
| 25 | Pittsburgh Pirates | 96 | 43 | 53 | .448 | 2015 | NL Central |
| 26 | Los Angeles Angels | 64 | 27 | 37 | .422 | 2014 | AL West |
| 27 | Colorado Rockies | 24 | 10 | 14 | .417 | 2018 | NL West |
| 28 | San Diego Padres | 68 | 28 | 40 | .412 | 2026 | NL West |
| 29 | Chicago Cubs | 133 | 51 | 81 | .383 | 2026 | NL Central |
| 30 | Minnesota Twins | 95 | 36 | 59 | .379 | 2023 | AL Central |

== See also ==
- List of Major League Baseball franchise postseason droughts

== General ==
- "Major League Teams and Baseball Encyclopedia". Baseball-Reference.
