= 1901 in baseball =

The following are the baseball events of the year 1901 throughout the world.

== Champions ==
=== Major League Baseball ===
- American League: Chicago White Stockings
- National League: Pittsburgh Pirates

=== Other champions ===
- Minor leagues
  - California League: San Francisco Wasps
  - Connecticut State League: Bristol Woodchoppers
  - Eastern League: Rochester Bronchos
  - Inter-Mountain League: Ogden
  - Interstate League or Western Association: champion unknown
  - New England League: Portland (ME)
  - New York State League: champion unknown
  - Pacific Northwest League: Portland Webfoots (OR)
  - Southern Association: Nashville Vols

== Statistical leaders ==
	American League		National League	
Stat	Player	Total	Player	Total
AVG	Nap Lajoie^{2} (PHA)	.426^{1}	Jesse Burkett (STL)	.376
HR	Nap Lajoie^{2} (PHA)	14	Sam Crawford (CIN)	16
RBI	Nap Lajoie^{2} (PHA)	125	Honus Wagner (PIT)	126
W	Cy Young^{3} (BOS)	33	Bill Donovan (BRO)	25
ERA	Cy Young^{3} (BOS)	1.62	Jesse Tannehill (PIT)	2.18
K	Cy Young^{3} (BOS)	158	Noodles Hahn (CIN)	239

^{1} Modern (post-1900) single season batting average record
^{2} American League Triple Crown batting winner
^{3} American League Triple Crown pitching winner

== Notable seasons ==
- Nap Lajoie of the Philadelphia Athletics hits .426, an AL batting average record that still stands today. This record is also the modern or post-1900 batting average record and is often cited as the highest batting average of all time. However, the all-time batting average leader is Hugh Duffy, who hit .440 in 1894.
- Cy Young of the Boston Americans leads the AL in ERA at 1.62 and wins 33 games, 41.8% of the Pilgrims' total.

== Major league baseball final standings ==
=== American League final standings ===
American League
Team	W	L	Pct.	GB	Home	Road
Chicago White Stockings	83	53	.610	—	49‍–‍21	34‍–‍32
Boston Americans	79	57	.581	4	49‍–‍20	30‍–‍37
Detroit Tigers	74	61	.548	8½	42‍–‍27	32‍–‍34
Philadelphia Athletics	74	62	.544	9	42‍–‍24	32‍–‍38
Baltimore Orioles	68	65	.511	13½	40‍–‍25	28‍–‍40
Washington Senators	61	72	.459	20½	31‍–‍35	30‍–‍37
Cleveland Blues	54	82	.397	29	28‍–‍39	26‍–‍43
Milwaukee Brewers	48	89	.350	35½	32‍–‍37	16‍–‍52

Locations of teams for the 1901 American League season
American League

=== National League final standings ===
National League
Team	W	L	Pct.	GB	Home	Road
Pittsburgh Pirates	90	49	.647	—	45‍–‍24	45‍–‍25
Philadelphia Phillies	83	57	.593	7½	46‍–‍23	37‍–‍34
Brooklyn Superbas	79	57	.581	9½	43‍–‍25	36‍–‍32
St. Louis Cardinals	76	64	.543	14½	40‍–‍31	36‍–‍33
Boston Beaneaters	69	69	.500	20½	41‍–‍29	28‍–‍40
Chicago Orphans	53	86	.381	37	30‍–‍39	23‍–‍47
New York Giants	52	85	.380	37	30‍–‍38	22‍–‍47
Cincinnati Reds	52	87	.374	38	27‍–‍43	25‍–‍44

Locations of teams for the 1900–1901 National League seasons
National League

== Events ==
=== January ===
- January 4 – The Baltimore Orioles club incorporates. John McGraw is manager and part-owner.
- January 27 – Hugh Duffy jumps from the Boston Beaneaters to the Milwaukee Brewers.
- January 28 – The American League reorganizes. The eight original clubs were the Chicago White Stockings, Milwaukee Brewers, Indianapolis Hoosiers, Detroit Tigers, Kansas City Blues (reconstituted as the Washington Senators), Cleveland Lake Shores, Buffalo Bisons, and Minneapolis Millers. The Hoosiers, Bisons, and Millers are contracted; the Boston Americans, Baltimore Orioles, and Philadelphia Athletics are admitted. Teams are limited to 14 players and will play 140 games per season. The Americans will refuse to resign the National Agreement and sue for full recognition as a major league.

=== February ===
- February 8 – Philadelphia Phillies second baseman Nap Lajoie, along with pitchers Chick Fraser and Bill Bernhard, jump to the new American League Philadelphia club, the Athletics.
- February 27 – The National League Rules Committee decrees that all foul balls are to count as strike balls, except after two strikes. To cut the cost of lost foul balls, the committee urges that batters who foul off good strikes are to be disciplined. The American League will not adopt this rule until the 1903 season. Other new rules: catchers must play within 10 feet of the batter; a ball will be called if the pitcher does not throw to a ready and waiting batter within 20 seconds, and players using indecent or improper language will be banished by the umpire. A ball will be called when a batter is hit by a pitch, but, in a mail vote, the owners will rescind this in April, and a HBP will earn a batter first base.

=== March ===
- March 2 – Jimmy Collins, Hugh Duffy, and Billy Sullivan jump the NL for the new AL. Collins will manage the Boston Americans, Duffy will manage the Milwaukee Brewers, and Sullivan will catch for the Chicago White Stockings.
- March 11 – John McGraw, manager of the Baltimore Orioles of the American League, attempts to sign infielder Charlie Grant, a black man, and attempt to pass him off as a Cherokee Indian named Tokohoma. However, Chicago White Sox president Charles Comiskey recognizes Grant and McGraw's attempt to integrate major league baseball falls apart.
- March 19 – Pitcher Cy Young jumps from the NL's St. Louis Cardinals to the AL's Boston Americans.
- March 28 – Philadelphia Phillies owner John Rogers files an injunction to stop Nap Lajoie, Bill Bernhard and Chick Fraser from playing for the Phillies' AL rival, the Philadelphia Athletics.

=== April ===
- April 3 – Connie Mack, famed Philadelphia Athletics manager, accuses Christy Mathewson of breaking a contract he had signed with the Athletics in January. Mathewson had in fact accepted money from the Athletics before rejoining the Giants in March.
- April 18 – With a six-run first-inning, the Brooklyn Superbas beat the Philadelphia Phillies 12–7 to open the National League's 1901 season.
- April 24 – The American League begins play as a new Major League. At South Side Park in Chicago, the White Stockings defeat the Cleveland Blues 8–2 as Roy Patterson collects his first of 20 wins.
- April 25 – History is made in just the second day of play in the new American League at Bennett Park. The Milwaukee Brewers are leading the Detroit Tigers 13–4 going into the ninth inning, when the Tigers rally and score 10 runs to win, 14–13. Pop Dillon drives in the winning run with his fourth double of the game, setting a Major League Baseball record with four doubles on Opening Day, that will be matched by Jim Greengrass in 1954.
- April 26 – Christy Mathewson records his first major league victory in the New York Giants' opener, beating the Brooklyn Superbas 5–3.
- April 27 – Billy Clingman of the Washington Senators hits the first home run in franchise history off Wiley Piatt of the Philadelphia Athletics. Washington would go on to win the game 11–5.
- April 28 – The Cleveland Blues defeat the Chicago White Sox 13–1. The Blues (who would later change their name to the Indians) hit 23 singles, 22 of them off White Sox pitcher Bock Baker.

=== May ===
- May 1 – Herm McFarland of the Chicago White Sox hits the first gland slam in American League history as the White Sox rout the Detroit Tigers 19–9. The Tigers commit an AL record 12 errors, 10 in the infield.
- May 2 – This was the date of the American League's first forfeit, with the Detroit Tigers playing the Chicago White Stockings. The Tigers scored five runs in the top of the ninth to put them on top, 7–5, and the White Stockings began stalling for a rainout. However, the umpire forfeited the game to the Tigers.
- May 4 – Future politician Fred Brown makes his MLB debut. Brown, who'd later win a seat as a Democrat in New Hampshire, only plays nine games over two years in the major leagues.
- May 8:
  - Amos Rusie, pitching for the Cincinnati Reds, makes his first start in more than two years. He loses, 14–3, and retires after two more appearances.
  - With the New York Giants leading the Philadelphia Phillies 9–8 with two out in the ninth, John Ganzel of the Giants pulls the hidden ball trick on Harry Wolverton of the Phillies. This trick ends the game and preserves the Giants' win.
- May 9 – Earl Moore of the Cleveland Blues pitched nine hitless innings against the Chicago White Stockings before giving up two hits in the 10th inning to lose 4–2.
- May 15 – Watty Lee throws the first shutout in American League history when the Washington Senators blank the Boston Americans 4–0 in Boston. The 21 year-old southpaw, who will finish the season with a 16–16 record, will be the author of two of the eight shutouts thrown in the Junior Circuit's inaugural season.
- May 17 – The Philadelphia Athletics are beating the Washington Senators 7–6 in the bottom of the ninth when Senators player Bill Coughlin hits an apparent game-ending home run. However, under the rules of the time, Coughlin is credited with just a single, as that is all that it would have taken for the Senators to beat the Athletics.
- May 21 – Andrew Freedman, owner of the New York Giants, refuses to allow umpire Billy Nash inside the Polo Grounds, accusing him of incompetence.
- May 23 – Nap Lajoie, on his way to hitting a record .426 for the Philadelphia Athletics, is considered such a dangerous hitter by the Chicago White Stockings that he is intentionally walked with the bases loaded.
  - Scoring nine runs in the bottom of the ninth at Cleveland's League Park, the Blues, later to be known as the Indians, stun the Senators, 14–13. The incredible comeback, which consists of six singles, two doubles, a walk, a hit batsman, and a passed ball, comes after two outs.
- May 27 – Third baseman Jimmy Burke of the Milwaukee Brewers sets an American League record by committing four errors in an inning. This record will be tied in 1914 by the Cleveland Naps' Ray Chapman, and in 1942 by the Chicago Cubs' Lenny Merullo.
- May 30 – In the afternoon game of a holiday doubleheader, the St. Louis Cardinals defeat the New York Giants 6–5 in 10 innings. An NL record 28,500 fans attend the game.

=== June ===
- June 9–17,000 fans attend the Reds–Giants game. The Giants are up, 15–4, after six innings, when the fans begin to overflow the field. Over the next two and a half innings, 19 runs score as ground-rule doubles multiply. As the crowd enters the infield, with the Giants leading 25–13, umpire Bob Emslie forfeits the game to the Giants. The game ends with a record 31 hits and 13 doubles.
- June 20 – Honus Wagner of the Pittsburgh Pirates steals home twice in one game as the Pirates beat the Giants 7–0.
  - The contract of Hughie Jennings is purchased by the Brooklyn Superbas from the Philadelphia Phillies.
- June 24 – Mike Donlin of the Baltimore Orioles goes 6–6 with 2 singles, 2 doubles and 2 triples as the Orioles defeat the Detroit Tigers 17–8.

=== July ===
- July 1 – With the Chicago Orphans playing the New York Giants at the Polo Grounds, Jack Doyle, first baseman of the Orphans who was formerly of the Giants, gets into a fight with a fan. Though the police arrive, Doyle does not get in trouble, though he has to take himself out of the game in the seventh as his hand is hurting.
  - Emil Frisk is released by the Detroit Tigers.
- July 10 – Harry Davis of the Philadelphia Athletics becomes the first player in American League history to hit for the cycle in a 13–6 victory over the Boston Americans.
- July 15 – New York Giants rookie pitcher Christy Mathewson pitches a no-hitter as the Giants beat the St. Louis Cardinals 5–0.
- July 23 – Fred Clarke of the Pittsburgh Pirates hits for the cycle in a 9–2 win over the Cincinnati Reds.
- July 24 – The playing career of Joe Quinn comes to an end after 17 years when he is released by the Washington Senators.
- July 30 – Philadelphia Athletics second-baseman Nap Lajoie hits for the cycle against the Cleveland Blues. Philadelphia defeats Cleveland, 11–5.

=== August ===
- August 5 – In the second inning of the nightcap against the Boston Americans, Jimmy Hart of the Baltimore Orioles punches umpire John Haskell in the face. The rookie first baseman who hits .311 playing in a total of only 58 games in his major league career, serves a ten-day suspension, but quits after going 4-for-4 upon his return because the team refused to pay the $25 he had been fined.
- August 10 – Dale Gear of the Washington Senators sets an American League record by giving up 41 total bases as he loses 13–0 to the Philadelphia Athletics. The Athletics pitcher Snake Wiltse has two doubles and two triples, only the third time a pitcher has collected four extra base hits in a game.

=== September ===
- September 1 – Days after his contract is sold by the Bridgeport Orators of the Connecticut State League to the Cincinnati Reds, Patsy Dougherty jumps from the NL to the AL's Boston Americans.
- September 3 – Joe McGinnity of the Baltimore Orioles collects two complete games in one day, beating the Milwaukee Brewers 10–0 and losing to them, 6–1.
- September 5 – The National Association of Professional Baseball Leagues, which would later become known as Minor League Baseball, was formed at a meeting of minor league executives at the Leland Hotel in Chicago. Patrick T. Powers, president of the Eastern League, became the first president of the NAPBL.
- September 19 – All games are cancelled due to the recent death of President William McKinley.
- September 21 – Though the Chicago White Stockings lose to the Philadelphia Athletics 10–4, they clinch the first pennant of the American League as the Detroit Tigers beat the Boston Americans 3–1.
- September 23 – The Brooklyn Superbas establish a new franchise record for runs scored in a game when they rout the Cincinnati Reds, 25–6. Brooklyn scores 11 runs in the fifth inning.
- September 23 and 24 – Jimmy Sheckard hits grand slams in two consecutive games, as the Brooklyn Dodgers beat the Cincinnati Reds 25–6 on 23rd and 16–2 on 24th.
- September 26 – The Pittsburgh Pirates beat the Brooklyn Dodgers 4–3, thus clinching the 1901 National League pennant.
- September 28 – The Baltimore Orioles sign outfielder Slats Jordan.

=== October ===
- October 19 – Ed Delahanty, Al Orth, Happy Townsend, and Harry Wolverton all jump from the NL's Philadelphia Phillies to the AL's Washington Senators. Meanwhile, Monte Cross, Bill Duggleby and Elmer Flick all jump from the Phillies to the AL's Philadelphia Athletics.

=== November ===
- November 5 – Sportsman Park is leased by the American League. Two weeks later, the league transfers the Milwaukee Brewers to St. Louis and the team is renamed the St. Louis Browns.

=== December ===
- December 3 – The Milwaukee Brewers are contracted from the American League, due to poor attendance and fiscal instability. The league adds the St. Louis Browns to replace the Brewers.
- December 19 – Rube Waddell jumps from the Chicago Orphans of the National League to Los Angeles of the California League.

== Births ==
=== January ===
- January 5 – Luke Sewell
- January 8 – Joe Benes
- January 11 – George McNamara
- January 13 – Fred Schulte
- January 24 – John Freeman
- January 24 – Grant Gillis
- January 24 – Curly Ogden
- January 24 – Flint Rhem
- January 27 – Fred Heimach
- January 28 – Ray Knode

=== February ===
- February 2 – Otto Miller
- February 3 – Ernie Maun
- February 6 – Glenn Wright
- February 11 – Jimmy O'Connell
- February 12 – Virgil Cheeves
- February 13 – Herman Layne
- February 17 – Eddie Phillips
- February 22 – Saul Davis
- February 22 – Dan Jessee

=== March ===
- March 2 – Butch Weis
- March 7 – Dick Loftus
- March 18 – Johnny Cooney
- March 25 – Denver Grigsby
- March 26 – Jim Battle

=== April ===
- April 8 – Carr Smith
- April 9 – Vic Sorrell
- April 19 – Bernie DeViveiros
- April 20 – Frank Wilson
- April 22 – Taylor Douthit
- April 22 – Jim Mahady
- April 22 – Juanelo Mirabal
- April 27 – Johnny Stuart

=== May ===
- May 6 – Earle Brucker
- May 10 – Ted Blankenship
- May 13 – Pat Burke
- May 13 – John Jones
- May 13 – Leo Taylor
- May 14 – Drew Rader
- May 18 – John Happenny
- May 19 – Newt Allen
- May 22 – Babe Ganzel
- May 24 – Mule Shirley
- May 25 – Bud Connolly
- May 25 – Doc Ozmer
- May 28 – Norm Lehr
- May 29 – Jim Stroner

=== June ===
- June 1 – Lou Legett
- June 1 – Fred Stiely
- June 7 – Jerry Conway
- June 8 – Leo Tankersley
- June 20 – Pryor McBee

=== July ===
- July 8 – Tex Wilson
- July 9 – Lou Polli
- July 20 – Heinie Manush
- July 23 – Mack Hillis
- July 24 – Bob Adams
- July 26 – Doc Gautreau
- July 28 – Freddie Fitzsimmons

=== August ===
- August 2 – Charlie Caldwell
- August 9 – Phil Todt
- August 14 – Oscar Siemer
- August 15 – Les Sweetland
- August 16 – Mahlon Higbee
- August 17 – Slim Embrey
- August 21 – Wes Schulmerich
- August 23 – Guy Bush
- August 27 – Johnny Berger
- August 27 – Phil Collins

=== September ===
- September 2 – Marty Griffin
- September 4 – Al Grabowski
- September 11 – George Loepp
- September 11 – Monroe Mitchell
- September 16 – Ken Ash
- September 18 – Tige Stone
- September 29 – Rabbit Benton
- September 29 – Tony Rensa

=== October ===
- October 1 – Jimmie Reese
- October 5 – Scottie Slayback
- October 6 – Carlisle Littlejohn
- October 12 – Erv Brame
- October 13 – Phil Hensiek
- October 16 – Al Yeargin
- October 25 – Ray Gardner
- October 27 – George Smith
- October 30 – Al Kellett
- October 31 – Ray Flaskamper

=== November ===
- November 2 – Jerry Standaert
- November 4 – Bill Henderson
- November 8 – Beauty McGowan
- November 13 – Moose Clabaugh
- November 14 – Bill Owens
- November 15 – John Dobb
- November 15 – Bunny Roser
- November 17 – Ed Taylor
- November 21 – Johnson Fry
- November 22 – Harry Rice
- November 22 – Walt Tauscher
- November 29 – Buddy Crump
- November 30 – Sid Graves
- November 30 – Clyde Sukeforth

=== December ===
- December 1 – Ed Coleman
- December 3 – Bennie Tate
- December 5 – Ray Moss
- December 5 – Carey Selph
- December 7 – Ralph Judd
- December 11 – Elbert Andrews
- December 12 – Bill Moore
- December 14 – Les Bell
- December 16 – Hugh McMullen
- December 23 – Ox Eckhardt
- December 25 – Buster Chatham
- December 26 – Doc Farrell
- December 28 – Wattie Holm
- December 30 – Dick Porter

== Deaths ==
- February 3 – Tom O'Brien, 27, outfielder for the Baltimore Orioles, Pittsburgh Pirates and New York Giants National League clubs between 1897 and 1900.
- February 21 – Dennis Driscoll, 38, second baseman for the 1885 Buffalo Bisons.
- February 22 – Tom Kinslow, 35, distinguished catcher during the Dead Ball Era, a career .266 hitter who posted a .923 fielding average for eight teams from 1886 to 1892.
- March 3 – Charles Snyder, 28, catcher/outfielder who hit .273 for the 1890 Philadelphia Athletics.
- March 24 – Mike Trost, 35[?], backup catcher/centerfielder/first baseman for the 1890 St. Louis Browns and 1895 Louisville Colonels.
- March 31 – George Popplein, 60, utility player who appeared in one game for the Baltimore Marylands during the 1873 season.
- April 10 – John Hiland, 40, backup infielder for the 1885 Philadelphia Quakers.
- April 14 – Pat Sullivan, 38, third baseman/centerfielder for the 1884 Kansas City Cowboys.
- April 20 – Bill Yeatman, 62, outfielder who played one game with the 1872 Washington Nationals.
- April 30 – Dude Esterbrook, 43, infielder who batted .314 for the pennant-winning 1884 New York Metropolitans
- June 17 – Bill Craver, 57, catcher and manager who later was expelled from organized baseball for gambling.
- July 9 – Sy Studley, 60, center fielder for the 1872 Washington Nationals of the National Association.
- July 11 – Dave McKeough, 37, catcher who hit .231 in part of two seasons for the Rochester Broncos (1890) and Philadelphia Athletics (1891).
- July 24 – Joe Simmons, 56, player in National Association for three seasons, them managed the 1884 Wilmington Quicksteps of the Union Association.
- August 15 – Gene Bagley, 40, catcher/outfielder for the 1886 New York Giants.
- August 15 – Milt Whitehead, 39[?], Canadian shortstop who played in 1884 with the St. Louis Maroons and Kansas City Cowboys.
- August 22 – Pete Sweeney, 37, infielder/outfielder who played from 1888 through 1890 for the Nationals, Browns, Athletics and Colonels.
- September 23 – Doc McJames, 27, pitcher who posted a 79-80 record with 593 strikeouts and a 3.43 ERA in six seasons, and led the National League with 156 strikeouts in 1897.
- October 9 – Chappy Lane, [?], who hit .203 with four home runs in 114 games for the Pittsburgh Alleghenys (1882) and Toledo Blue Stockings (1884), and led American Association first basemen in fielding percentage (1882).
- October 16 – Jim Duncan, 28, catcher/first baseman for the Cleveland Spiders and Washington Senators during the 1899 season.
- October 31 – John Cahill, 36, outfielder/infielder/pitcher for the Columbus Buckeyes (1884), St. Louis Maroons (1886) and Indianapolis Hoosiers (1887).
- November 2 – John Corcoran, 28[?], infielder for the 1895 Pittsburgh Pirates.
- November 7 – Tub Welch, 35, catcher/first baseman who hit .261 in 82 games for the Toledo Maumees (1890) and Louisville Colonels (1895).
- November 29 – Jim Sullivan, 34, who posted a career pitching record of a 26-28 and was a member of the 1897 National League Champions Boston Beaneaters.
- December 19 – Jim Gifford, 56, manager for two American Association teams from 1884 to 1886.
- December 28 – George Flynn, 30, outfielder for the 1896 Chicago Cubs.
