= 1901 Washington Senators season =

1901 Washington Senators
- League: American League
- Ballpark: American League Park I
- City: Washington, D.C.
- Record: 61–72 (.459)
- League place: 6th
- Owners: Ban Johnson, Fred Postal and Jim Manning
- Managers: Jim Manning

The 1901 Washington Senators won 61 games, lost 72, and finished in sixth place in the American League in its first year as a major league team. They were managed by Jim Manning and played home games at the American League Park I.

== Regular season ==
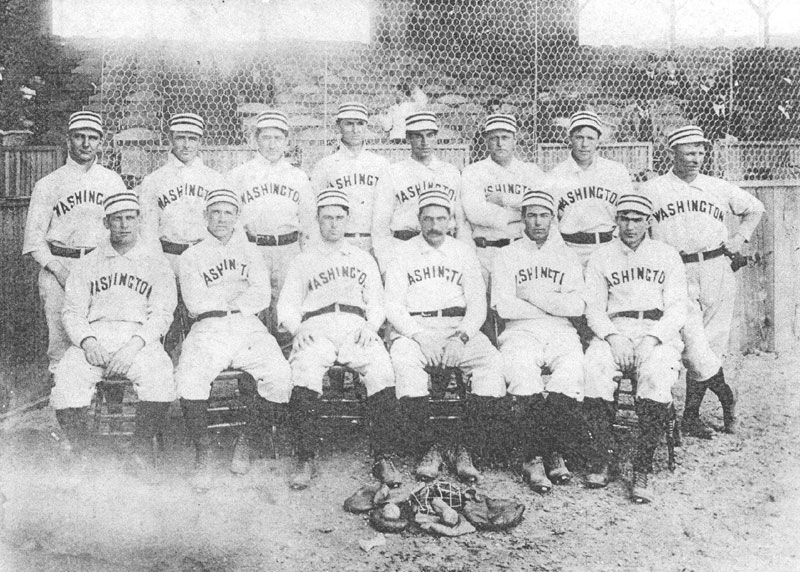
The 1901 Washington Senators

=== Season standings ===
American League
Team	W	L	Pct.	GB	Home	Road
Chicago White Stockings	83	53	.610	—	49‍–‍21	34‍–‍32
Boston Americans	79	57	.581	4	49‍–‍20	30‍–‍37
Detroit Tigers	74	61	.548	8½	42‍–‍27	32‍–‍34
Philadelphia Athletics	74	62	.544	9	42‍–‍24	32‍–‍38
Baltimore Orioles	68	65	.511	13½	40‍–‍25	28‍–‍40
Washington Senators	61	72	.459	20½	31‍–‍35	30‍–‍37
Cleveland Blues	54	82	.397	29	28‍–‍39	26‍–‍43
Milwaukee Brewers	48	89	.350	35½	32‍–‍37	16‍–‍52

=== Record vs. opponents ===
1901 American League record Sources:
Team	BAL	BOS	CWS	CLE	DET	MIL	PHA	WSH
Baltimore	—	9–9	4–14–1	11–9	9–10	12–7–1	12–8	11–8
Boston	9–9	—	12–8	12–6	9–11–1	15–5	10–10	12–8–1
Chicago	14–4–1	8–12	—	13–7	10–10	16–4	12–8	10–8
Cleveland	9–11	6–12	7–13	—	6–14	11–9	6–14	9–9–2
Detroit	10–9	11–9–1	10–10	14–6	—	13–7	7–9	9–11
Milwaukee	7–12–1	5–15	4–16	9–11	7–13	—	6–14	10–8–1
Philadelphia	8–12	10–10	8–12	14–6	9–7	14–6	—	11–9–1
Washington	8–11	8–12–1	8–10	9–9–2	11–9	8–10–1	9–11–1	—

=== Roster ===
1901 Washington Senators
Roster
Pitchers: Bill Carrick; Watty Lee; Win Mercer; Casey Patten	Catchers: Boileryard Clarke; Infielders: Billy Clingman; Bill Coughlin; Bill Everitt; John Farrell; Mike Grady; Tim Jordan; Joe Quinn	Outfielders: Sam Dungan; Pop Foster; Dale Gear; Leo Harrison; Charlie Luskey; Jack O'Brien; Irv Waldron	Manager: Jim Manning

== Player stats ==
=== Batting ===
==== Starters by position ====
Note: Pos = Position; G = Games played; AB = At bats; H = Hits; Avg. = Batting average; HR = Home runs; RBI = Runs batted in

Pos	Player	G	AB	H	Avg.	HR	RBI
C	Boileryard Clarke	110	422	118	.280	3	54
1B	Mike Grady	94	347	99	.285	9	56
2B	John Farrell	135	555	151	.272	3	63
SS	Billy Clingman	137	480	116	.242	2	55
3B	Bill Coughlin	137	506	139	.275	6	68
OF	Irv Waldron	79	332	107	.322	0	23
OF	Pop Foster	103	392	109	.278	6	54
OF	Sam Dungan	138	559	179	.320	1	73

==== Other batters ====
Note: G = Games played; AB = At bats; H = Hits; Avg. = Batting average; HR = Home runs; RBI = Runs batted in

Player	G	AB	H	Avg.	HR	RBI
Joe Quinn	66	266	67	.252	2	34
Dale Gear	58	199	47	.236	0	20
Bill Everitt	33	115	22	.191	0	8
Jack O'Brien	11	45	8	.178	0	5
Charlie Luskey	11	41	8	.195	0	3
Tim Jordan	6	20	4	.200	0	2
Leo Harrison	1	2	0	.000	0	0

=== Pitching ===
==== Starting pitchers ====
Note: G = Games pitched; IP = Innings pitched; W = Wins; L = Losses; ERA = Earned run average; SO = Strikeouts

Player	G	IP	W	L	ERA	SO
Bill Carrick	42	324.0	14	22	3.75	70
Watty Lee	36	262.0	16	16	4.40	63
Casey Patten	32	254.1	18	10	3.93	109
Win Mercer	24	179.2	9	13	4.96	31

==== Other pitchers ====
Note: G = Games pitched; IP = Innings pitched; W = Wins; L = Losses; ERA = Earned run average; SO = Strikeouts

Player	G	IP	W	L	ERA	SO
Dale Gear	24	163.0	4	11	4.03	35
