= Ed Bruyette =

American baseball player (1874-1940)

- Outfielder
- Born: August 31, 1874; Manawa, Wisconsin, U.S.
- Died: August 5, 1940 (aged 65); Peshastin, Washington, U.S.
- Batted: Left Threw: Right

MLB debut
- August 6, 1901, for the Milwaukee Brewers

Last MLB appearance
- September 10, 1901, for the Milwaukee Brewers

MLB statistics
- Batting average: .183
- Home runs: 0
- Runs batted in: 4
- Stats at Baseball Reference

Teams
- Milwaukee Brewers (1901)

Edward T. Bruyette (August 31, 1874 – August 5, 1940) was an American professional baseball outfielder. He played for the Milwaukee Brewers in 1901.

Bruyette was born in Manawa, Wisconsin, and began his professional baseball career in 1900 in the International League. In 1901, he was acquired by the Brewers' player-manager Hugh Duffy and played in 26 major league games in August and September. He batted a minuscule .183, and his fielding percentage as an outfielder was .778 (8 errors in 36 chances). The following season, Bruyette was back in the minors, where he played until 1907. After his baseball career ended, he was a grading foreman in a packing plant. He died in Peshastin, Washington, at the age of 65.
