= Phil Geier =

American baseball player (1876–1967)

- Outfielder
- Born: November 3, 1876; Washington, D.C., U.S.
- Died: September 25, 1967 (aged 90); Spokane, Washington, U.S.
- Batted: Left Threw: Right

MLB debut
- August 17, 1896, for the Philadelphia Phillies

Last MLB appearance
- October 8, 1904, for the Boston Beaneaters

MLB statistics
- Batting average: .249
- Home runs: 2
- Runs batted in: 102
- Stats at Baseball Reference

Teams
- Philadelphia Phillies (1896–1897); Cincinnati Reds (1900); Philadelphia Athletics (1901); Milwaukee Brewers (1901); Boston Beaneaters (1904)

Philip Louis Geier (November 3, 1876 – September 25, 1967) was an American Major League Baseball outfielder. He played during five seasons for five different teams in the major leagues between 1896 and 1904. As a left-handed hitter, Geier played more than 2300 innings in the outfield, but also found himself playing all three infield positions of second base, third base, and shortstop. Geier recorded the most playing time in his final major league season with the Boston BeanEaters, playing in 149 games and batting .243 in 580 at bats.

Geier left baseball after 1904 and later moved to Washington State. He died in 1967 and buried at St. Joseph Cemetery. In Trentwood, Washington.
