= Ben Beville =

American baseball player (1877–1937)

- Pitcher / First baseman
- Born: August 28, 1877; Colusa, California, U.S.
- Died: January 5, 1937 (aged 59); Yountville, California, U.S.
- Batted: Right Threw: Right

MLB debut
- May 24, 1901, for the Boston Americans

Last MLB appearance
- June 2, 1901, for the Boston Americans

MLB statistics
- Win–loss record: 0–2
- Earned run average: 4.00
- Strikeouts: 1
- Stats at Baseball Reference

Teams
- Boston Americans (1901)

Clarence Benjamin Beville (August 28, 1877 – January 5, 1937) was an American pitcher and first baseman in Major League Baseball.

Beville was an original member of the American League Boston Americans club during the 1901 season. He made his debut on May 24, 1901, and played his final game on June 2, 1901.

In two pitching appearances, Beville posted a 0–2 record with one strikeout and a 4.00 ERA in nine innings, including a complete game. As a hitter, he compiled a .286 average (2-for-7) with two doubles, two runs, and one RBI in three games played.
