= Frank Morrissey (baseball) =

American baseball player (1876-1939)

- Pitcher
- Born: May 5, 1876; Baltimore, Maryland, U.S.
- Died: February 22, 1939 (aged 62); Baltimore, Maryland, U.S.
- Batted: Unknown Threw: Right

MLB debut
- July 13, 1901, for the Boston Americans

Last MLB appearance
- October 4, 1902, for the Chicago Orphans

MLB statistics
- Win–loss record: 1–3
- Earned run average: 2.23
- Strikeouts: 14
- Stats at Baseball Reference

Teams
- Boston Americans (1901); Chicago Orphans (1902)

Michael Joseph Morrissey (May 5, 1876 – February 22, 1939), known as Frank and nicknamed "Deacon," was an American pitcher in Major League Baseball in the early twentieth century. Morrissey appeared in a total of six games as a pitcher in 1901 and 1902, five of which were as a member of the Chicago Orphans. He compiled a 1–3 record with fourteen strikeouts in his six appearances. The Orphans also used him as a third baseman in two games in 1902.
