= Jake Volz =

American baseball player (1878–1962)

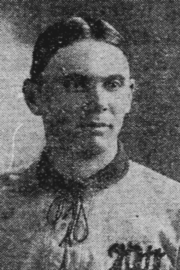
- Pitcher
- Born: April 4, 1878; San Antonio, Texas, U.S.
- Died: August 11, 1962 (aged 84); San Antonio, Texas, U.S.
- Batted: Right Threw: Right

MLB debut
- September 28, 1901, for the Boston Americans

Last MLB appearance
- September 2, 1908, for the Cincinnati Reds

MLB statistics
- Win–loss record: 2-4
- Earned run average: 6.10
- Strikeouts: 12
- Stats at Baseball Reference

Teams
- Boston Americans (1901); Boston Beaneaters (1905); Cincinnati Reds (1908)

Jacob Phillip "Silent Jake" Volz (April 4, 1878 – August 11, 1962) was an American pitcher in Major League Baseball who played between 1901 and 1908 for the Boston Americans (1901), Boston Beaneaters (1905) and Cincinnati Reds (1908). Listed at 5 ft 10 in (1.78 m), 175 lb., Volz batted and threw right-handed. He was born in San Antonio, Texas.

In a three-season career, Volz posted a 2–4 record with 12 strikeouts and a 6.10 ERA in 11 appearances, including seven starts, two complete games, and 38⅓ innings of work.

Volz married Anna (Cloud) Zuercher 1909 in San Antonio. On May 19, 1911, he shot Anna point blank in the face in front of their home while she was holding the hand of her five-year-old son from a prior marriage. She died almost instantly. He was subsequently found not guilty of murder by reason of insanity.

Volz died in his hometown of San Antonio, Texas, at age 84.
