= Win Kellum =

Canadian baseball player (1876–1951)

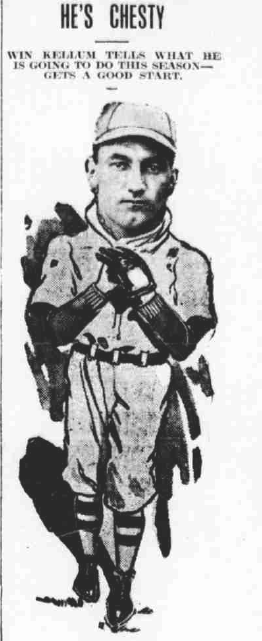
- Pitcher
- Born: April 11, 1876; Waterford, Ontario, Canada
- Died: August 10, 1951 (aged 75); Big Rapids, Michigan, U.S.
- Batted: Switch Threw: Left

MLB debut
- April 26, 1901, for the Boston Americans

Last MLB appearance
- June 16, 1905, for the St. Louis Cardinals

MLB statistics
- Win–loss record: 20–16
- Earned run average: 3.19
- Strikeouts: 97
- Stats at Baseball Reference

Teams
- Boston Americans (1901); Cincinnati Reds (1904); St. Louis Cardinals (1905)

Winford Ansley Kellum (April 11, 1876 – August 10, 1951) was a Canadian starting pitcher in Major League Baseball who played between 1901 and 1905 for the Boston Americans (1901), Cincinnati Reds (1904) and St. Louis Cardinals (1905). Listed at 5'10", 190 lb., Kellum was a switch-hitter and threw left-handed.

Optimistically nicknamed "Win", Kellum became the first Opening Day starting pitcher in the Boston American League franchise's history, as they lost to the host Baltimore Orioles, 10–6, at Oriole Park (April 26, 1901). He went 2–3 with a 6.38 ERA for the rest of the season.

Kellum rebounded in 1902, going 25–10 with the minor league Indianapolis Indians, champions of the newly formed American Association. After the regular season, he pitched with barnstormers largely made up of Cincinnati National League team. After that, he enjoyed his best season in the majors with the 1904 Reds, going 15–10 while recording career-highs in ERA (2.60), complete games (22) and innings (224). He also pitched for the Cardinals in 1905, his last major league season, and went 3–3 with a 2.92 ERA.

In a three-season career, Kellum posted a 20–16 record with a 3.01 ERA in 48 appearances, including 37 starts, 32 complete games, two shutouts, two saves, 97 strikeouts, 63 walks, and 346 2/3 of work.

Kellum died in Big Rapids, Michigan at the age of 75.

== See also ==
- List of Major League Baseball players from Canada

== Sources ==
- Career statistics from Baseball Reference · Baseball Reference (Minors) · Retrosheet · Baseball Almanac
- Baseball Library, April 1901
- 1901 Boston Americans
- SABR Biography Project
