= Wid Conroy =

American baseball player (1877–1959)

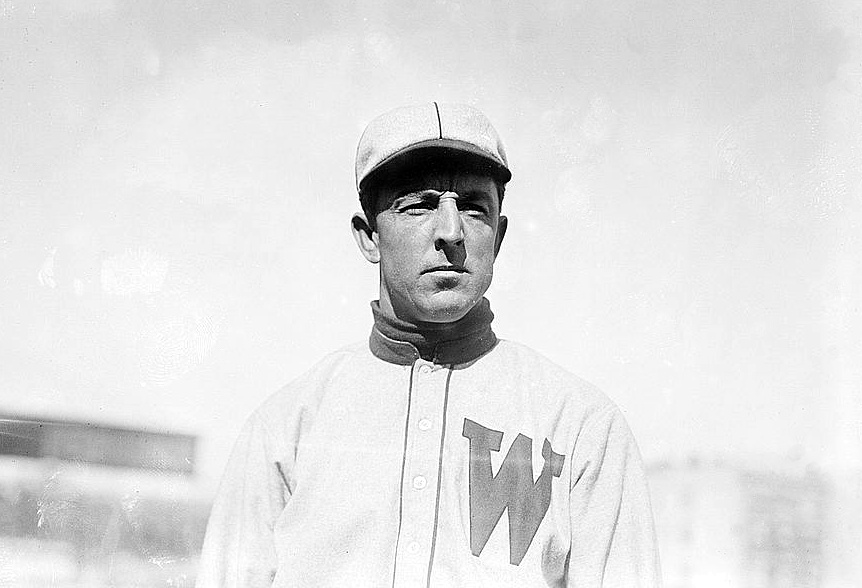
- Conroy c. 1911
- Third baseman / Shortstop / Left fielder
- Born: April 5, 1877; Philadelphia, Pennsylvania, U.S.
- Died: December 6, 1959 (aged 82); Mount Holly, New Jersey, U.S.
- Batted: Right Threw: Right

MLB debut
- April 25, 1901, for the Milwaukee Brewers

Last MLB appearance
- October 5, 1911, for the Washington Senators

MLB statistics
- Batting average: .248
- Home runs: 22
- Runs batted in: 452
- Stats at Baseball Reference

Teams
- Milwaukee Brewers (1901); Pittsburgh Pirates (1902); New York Highlanders (1903–1908); Washington Senators (1909–1911)

William Edward "Wid" Conroy (April 5, 1877 – December 6, 1959) was an American professional baseball player, active in Major League Baseball (MLB) during the first decade of the 20th century.

== Career ==
Born in Philadelphia on April 5, 1877, Conroy made his major league debut at the age of 24 on April 25, 1901, with the Milwaukee Brewers. He played his last game on October 5, 1911, for the Washington Senators. Standing at 5 ft 9 in (175 cm) and weighing 158 pounds (72 kg), Conroy epitomized the role of a utility man, playing every infield and outfield position in his 11-season career. He played for the Brewers (1901), Pittsburgh Pirates (1902), New York Highlanders (1903–1908), and Senators (1909–1911).

Conroy began his career as a shortstop, replacing Honus Wagner with Paterson in the Atlantic League, but was struck by malarial fever and dropped from the team. In 1900 Connie Mack invited him to try out for the Western Association team he would field in Milwaukee and transfer to Philadelphia when the American League began as a major circuit; Conroy won the last spot on the roster. Conroy was the first-string shortstop of the NL champion 1902 Pirates but became a third baseman when he returned to the AL with the Highlanders in 1903 over some controversy of his exit. He led AL third basemen twice in total chances per game. His 22-year career in pro baseball ended as a Philadelphia Phillies coach in 1922.

In his prime, Conroy was a fine base-stealing threat. He was an Opening Day starter for the New York Highlanders (now the Yankees) during the first five years of the team's existence (1903–1907). Batting and throwing right-handed, Conroy led the club with four home runs in 1906 and was fifth in the league overall. He also stole 41 bases in 1907, second only to Ty Cobb, who swiped 49 that year. On September 25, 1911, he set an AL record with 13 total chances at 3B in a 3–2 loss to Cleveland. In 1,377 career games, Conroy batted .248 with 22 home runs and 452 RBI.

== Legacy and death ==
At the 1945 election for the National Baseball Hall of Fame, Baseball Writers' Association of America voters failed to elect anyone for the 1945 class. Out of 247 ballots, with 186 being required to be elected, Conroy was one of 34 players on the ballot to receive a single vote. Conroy's son, William Jr., was killed in action at the Battle of Okinawa on May 9, 1945, along with three other residents of New Jersey.

After baseball, he worked for the Burlington County Trust Company as a banker for 30 years before retiring in 1953. Conroy had a heart attack in 1956, affecting his health. Conroy suffered a stroke at his home in Moorestown, New Jersey in November 1959. He died at Burlington County Hospital in Mount Holly on the early morning of December 6, 1959 after complications from the stroke. His funeral was held at the Mount Carmel Cemetery in Moorestown.

== See also ==
- List of Major League Baseball career stolen bases leaders
