= Pete Dowling =

American baseball player (1876–1905)

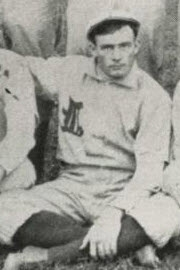
- Pitcher
- Born: July 15, 1876; St. Louis, Missouri, U.S.
- Died: June 30, 1905 (aged 28); Hot Lake, Oregon, U.S.
- Batted: Left Threw: Left

MLB debut
- July 17, 1897, for the Louisville Colonels

Last MLB appearance
- September 28, 1901, for the Cleveland Blues

MLB statistics
- Win–loss record: 39–64
- Earned run average: 3.84
- Strikeouts: 300
- Stats at Baseball Reference

Teams
- Louisville Colonels (1897–1899); Milwaukee Brewers (1901); Cleveland Blues (1901)

Henry Peter Dowling (July 15, 1876 – June 30, 1905) was an American professional baseball pitcher. He played in the major leagues for four seasons; 1897–1899 with the Louisville Colonels, and in 1901 with the Milwaukee Brewers and the Cleveland Blues (later the Baltimore Orioles and Cleveland Guardians, respectively). Listed at 5 feet 11 inches (1.80 m) and 165 pounds (75 kg), he threw and batted left-handed. Dowling is best remembered for a game he pitched in June 1901, which may have been the first no-hitter in American League history.

== Career ==
Dowling first pitched professionally in 1897 with the Milwaukee Brewers, then a minor league team in the Western League. He made his major league debut with the Louisville Colonels of the National League in July, appearing in four major league games and registering a 1–2 win–loss record with a 5.88 earned run average (ERA). He played in 36 games for the Colonels the following season, accruing a 4.16 ERA with a 13–20 record. In his final season with Louisville, 1899, he went 13–17 in 35 games with a 3.05 ERA.

After the ousting of Louisville from the National League following the 1899 season, Dowling had planned to play with the Pittsburgh club, but began to develop a serious drinking problem that put his career in limbo.

Dowling relocated to Kentucky, where his family lived, and played for the minor league Brewers in 1900. In 1901, the first season of the American League, he made 10 appearances with the Brewers (now a major league team; they would relocate the following season, becoming the St. Louis Browns) and 33 appearances with the Cleveland Blues, registering a combined record of 12–25 with a 4.15 ERA.

Alcoholism further jeopardized his career, limiting his playing opportunities for the 1902 season. He went to California and played with the Sacramento Gilt Edges, an independent team, and to Montana to play for the Butte Miners of the Pacific Northwest League. He finished his career with the Miners in 1903 and 1904.

=== Possible no-hitter ===
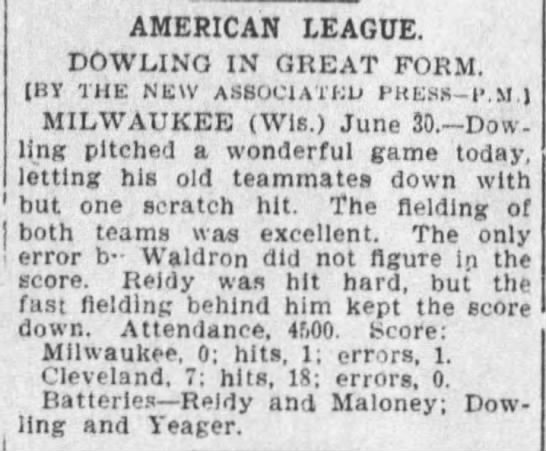
Associated Press game account, reporting that Dowling allowed one hit

On June 30, 1901, pitching for the Cleveland Blues against the Milwaukee Brewers, Dowling threw what may have been the first no-hitter in the American League's young history. He walked four batters, had one hit batsman, and otherwise allowed only Wid Conroy as a baserunner. The status of this game has long been disputed; specifically, how Conroy reached base in the seventh inning. While some sources credit Conroy with an infield single, other sources indicate he reached base on an error by third baseman Bill Bradley, and Conroy's career statistics do not credit him with a hit in this game. An in-depth article about the game from the Society for American Baseball Research (SABR) posits, "The most plausible explanation for the divergence is that the official scorer, who was probably a Milwaukee sportswriter, changed the hit to an error after the game had ended." As of April 2021, Retrosheet and Baseball-Reference.com credit Dowling with a no-hitter, but the Elias Sports Bureau (the official statisticians of Major League Baseball) does not recognize it.

== Personal life ==
Dowling was the eldest child of Michael J. and Ellen Dowling of St. Louis, Missouri.

On June 30, 1905, Dowling was on his way to La Grande, Oregon, where he had joined a semi-professional team. Dowling missed his train at Fox Lake station in Union County, and decided to walk along the tracks en route to the game. While walking on the track in Hot Lake, Oregon, Dowling was struck by an oncoming train which decapitated him. He was interred at Odd Fellows Cemetery in La Grande.

== Sources ==
- Lee, Bill (2009). The Baseball Necrology: The Post-Baseball Lives and Deaths of More Than 7,600 Major League Players and Others. McFarland. ISBN 978-0-786-44239-3.

Achievements
Preceded by Noodles Hahn	No-hitter pitcher June 30, 1901 (not recognized by MLB)	Succeeded by Christy Mathewson
