= Snake Wiltse =

American baseball player (1871–1928)

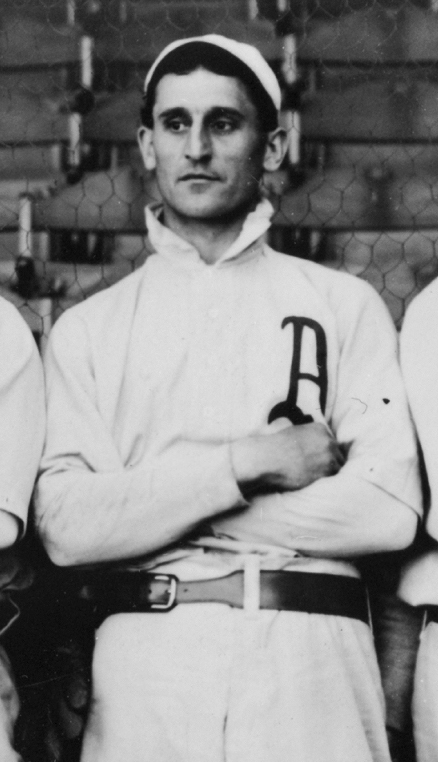
- Pitcher
- Born: December 5, 1871; Bouckville, New York
- Died: August 25, 1928 (aged 56); Harrisburg, Pennsylvania
- Batted: Right Threw: Left

MLB debut
- May 5, 1901, for the Pittsburgh Pirates

Last MLB appearance
- May 18, 1903, for the New York Highlanders

MLB statistics
- Win–loss record: 29–31
- Earned run average: 4.59
- Strikeouts: 121
- Stats at Baseball Reference

Teams
- Pittsburgh Pirates (1901); Philadelphia Athletics (1901–1902); Baltimore Orioles (1902); New York Highlanders (1903)

Lewis DeWitt "Snake" Wiltse (December 5, 1871 – August 25, 1928) was a pitcher in Major League Baseball. He played for the Pittsburgh Pirates, Philadelphia Athletics, Baltimore Orioles, and New York Highlanders from 1901 to 1903. His younger brother was fellow major league pitcher George "Hooks" Wiltse.

== Career ==
Lewis Wiltse was born in Bouckville, New York. Nicknamed "Snake" because of his highly contorted pitching motion, he started playing semi-pro baseball in 1894 and then began his professional career in 1899 with the Toledo Mud Hens. In January 1901, Wiltse was acquired by the National League's Pirates. He went 1–4 and was released in mid-season.

Wiltse then signed with the Philadelphia Athletics on July 20. He pitched well the rest of the year, going 13–5 and also batting .326. On August 10, he made history, hitting two doubles and two triples for 10 total bases, which set an MLB record for pitchers. Wiltse also pitched a shutout in that game.

In 1902, Wiltse played for the Athletics, going 8–8, before he was sold to the Baltimore Orioles. The Baltimore franchise was transferred to New York for the following season, and Wiltse continued to pitch poorly. His earned run average was higher than 5.00 in 1902 and 1903. He played his final major league game on May 18, 1903, and then went down to the minors.

Wiltse pitched in the Eastern League, Tri-State League, and New York State League from 1903 to 1910. He won 20 games once, in 1904, and finished his career with 69 minor league victories to go along with his 29 major league wins. His overall major league pitching record was 29 wins and 31 losses in 62 games, with an earned run average of 4.59. As a major league hitter, he compiled a .278 batting average and a .398 slugging percentage in 284 at bats.

Wiltse was married and had one daughter. He died in Harrisburg, Pennsylvania, at the age of 56.
