= Watty Lee =

American baseball player (1879–1936)

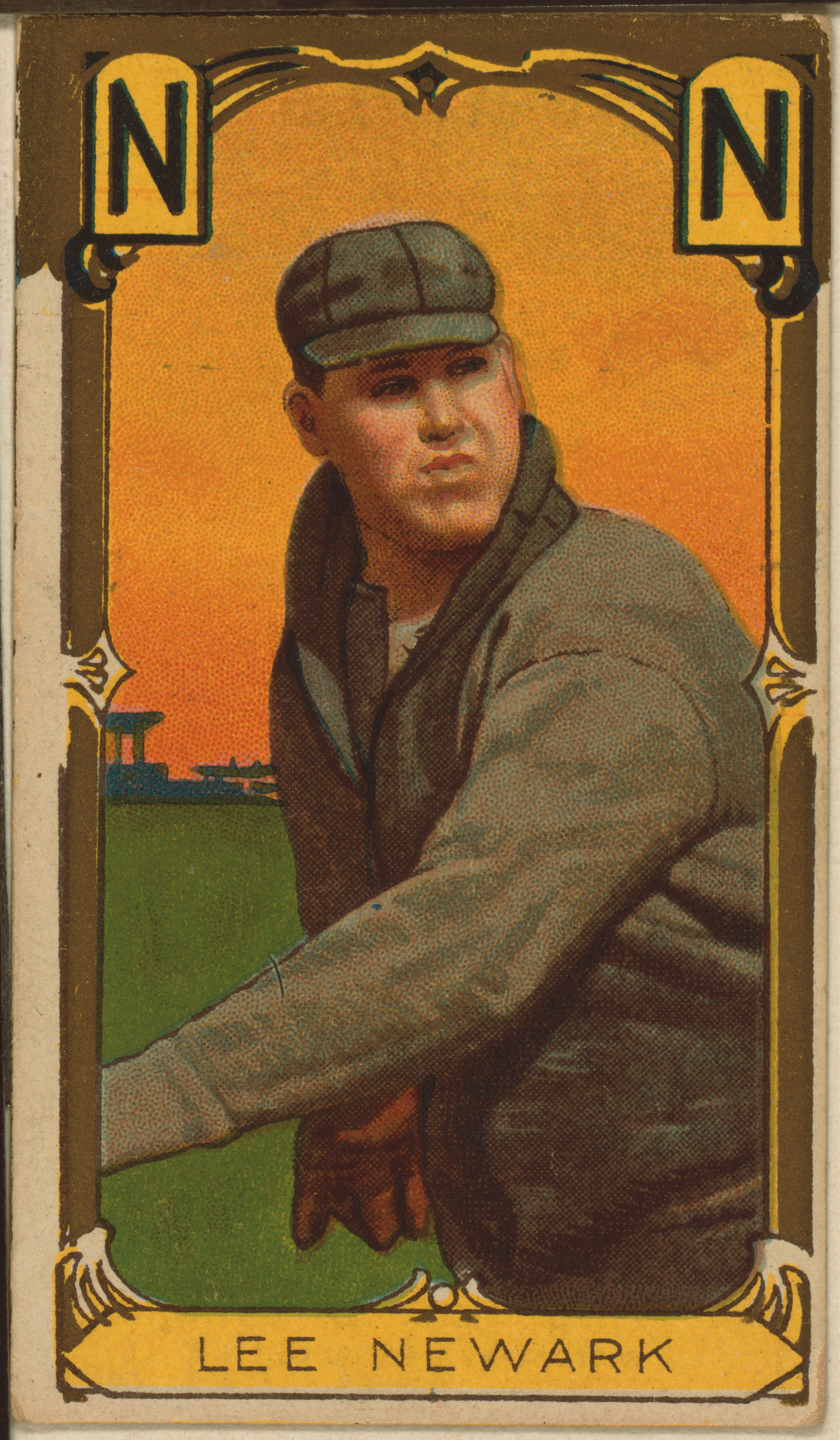
- Watty Lee with the Newark Indians in 1910
- Outfielder / Pitcher
- Born: August 12, 1879; Lynch Station, Virginia, U.S.
- Died: March 6, 1936 (aged 56); Washington, D.C., U.S.
- Batted: Left Threw: Left

MLB debut
- April 30, 1901, for the Washington Senators

Last MLB appearance
- May 26, 1904, for the Pittsburgh Pirates

MLB statistics
- Batting average: .242
- Home runs: 4
- Runs batted in: 70
- Win–loss record: 30–37
- Strikeouts: 162
- Earned run average: 4.29
- Stats at Baseball Reference

Teams
- Washington Senators (1901–1903); Pittsburgh Pirates (1904)

Wyatt Arnold "Watty" Lee (August 12, 1879 – March 6, 1936) was an American Major League Baseball (MLB) outfielder and pitcher. He played all or part of four seasons in the majors, from 1901 until 1904, for the Washington Senators and Pittsburgh Pirates.

Lee broke into the major leagues with the ascension of the American League to major league status in 1901. Playing for the Senators, Lee won 16 games, second on the team to Case Patten's 18 wins. He also played 7 games in the outfield and batted .256.

In 1902, Lee was moved to the outfield full-time, playing 96 games there. He batted .256 again and set career highs in every other major statistical category. He hit all four of his career home runs this season. Lee also pitched in 13 games with a record of 5–7.

1903 saw Lee splitting his time more evenly between pitching and the outfield. Lee played 47 games in the outfield and 22 games as a pitcher. His batting average slipped to just .208, but he had a career-best ERA of 3.08 while posting a record of 8–12.

Lee jumped to the National League in 1904, playing for the defending NL champion Pirates. He appeared in just 8 games, 5 as a pitcher and 3 as a pinch hitter. Although he went 4-for-12 at the plate for a .333 batting average, his pitching record was not nearly as good, as he posted a bloated 8.74 ERA while winning 1 game and losing 2.

While this was the end of Lee's major league career, he went on to a long career in minor league baseball. He continued to split his time between pitching and the outfield until 1909, when he became a pitcher only. He finished his career in 1917 with the Richmond Virginians of the International League, with at least 142 wins in the minor leagues over a 16-year span.

Lee died of cardiac disease on March 6, 1936, in Washington, D.C. He was interred at Mount Olivet Cemetery in Washington, D.C.

== Sources ==
- Career statistics from Baseball Reference · Baseball Reference (Minors) · Retrosheet · Baseball Almanac
