= Irv Waldron =

American baseball player (1876-1944)

- Outfielder
- Born: January 21, 1876; Hillside, New York, U.S.
- Died: July 22, 1944 (aged 68); Worcester, Massachusetts, U.S.
- Batted: Right Threw: Right

MLB debut
- April 25, 1901, for the Milwaukee Brewers

Last MLB appearance
- September 27, 1901, for the Washington Senators

MLB statistics
- Batting average: .311
- Home runs: 0
- Runs batted in: 52
- Stats at Baseball Reference

Teams
- Milwaukee Brewers (1901); Washington Senators (1901)

Irving J. Waldron (January 24, 1876 – July 22, 1944) was an American Major League Baseball player. He played outfield for the Milwaukee Brewers and the Washington Senators in the 1901 season. He was born in Hillside, New York on January 21, 1876. Waldron played 141 games in 1901, his only season. He got 186 hits with an average of .311. Irv had 0 home runs, 52 RBIs, 102 runs scored, and 20 stolen bases. After his Major League career ended, Waldron played minor league baseball until 1910 before retiring from the game. Irv Waldron was 5 foot 5, batted right-handed and threw right-handed. He died on July 22, 1944, in Worcester, Massachusetts.
