= Juanelo Mirabal =

Cuban American baseball player

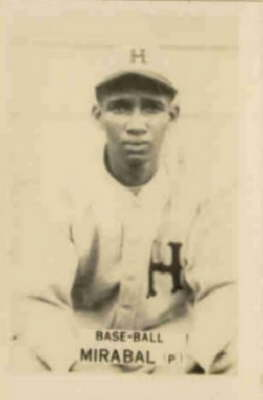
- Pitcher
- Born: April 22, 1901; Tampa, Florida, U.S.
- Died: July 11, 1989 (aged 88); Englishtown, New Jersey, U.S.
- Batted: Right Threw: Right

Negro league baseball debut
- 1920, for the Birmingham Black Barons

Last appearance
- 1934, for the Cuban Stars (East)

Teams
- Birmingham Black Barons (1920); Cuban Stars (East) (1921–1929, 1934)

Juanelo Mirabal (April 22, 1901 – July 11, 1989) was a Cuban American professional baseball pitcher in the Negro leagues. He played from 1920 to 1934 with the Birmingham Black Barons and Cuban Stars (East). A formidable pitcher for 14 years in the Negro Leagues, this rifle-armed, right hander used a 3/4 overhand delivery, had excellent control, a sinking fastball, and a baffling curve to anchor the Cuban Stars' mound corps. During the winters, Juanelo pitched in the Cuban League, posting a 9-2 record as the ace of Dolph Luque's Havana team. He was born in Tampa, FL and was of Cuban parentage. As a youngster, he attracted attention when he shutout Pompez's Cuban Stars in both ends of a doubleheader in New Orleans. He was often only listed in box scores as only "Juanelo." He later joined the front office, serving as President of both Cuban Stars and Pompez's New York Cubans after they were organized.
