= Samuel Yeatman =

American baseball player (1839–1901)

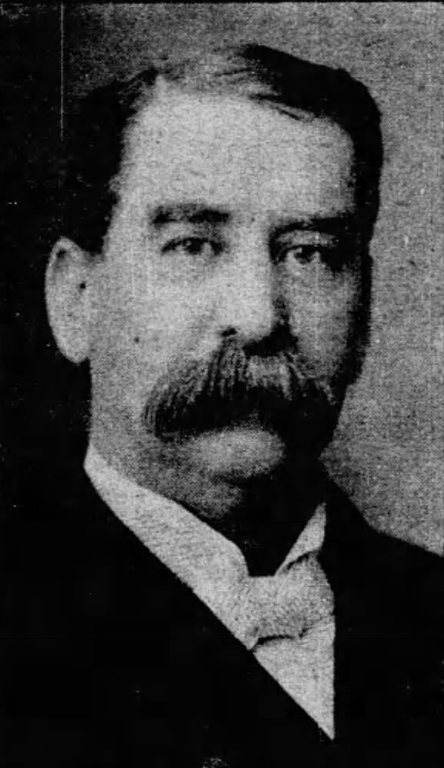
- Outfielder
- Born: April 13, 1848; Washington, D.C.
- Died: December 13, 1905 (aged 57); Washington, D.C.
- Batted: Unknown Threw: Unknown

MLB debut
- April 20, 1872, for the Washington Nationals

Last MLB appearance
- April 20, 1872, for the Washington Nationals

MLB statistics
- Batting average: .000
- Games played: 1
- At bats: 4
- Stats at Baseball Reference

Teams
- Washington Nationals (1872)

Samuel M. Yeatman (April 13, 1848 – December 13, 1905) was a baseball player for the Washington Nationals of the National Association in 1872. He only played one game in his career, playing right field for the Nationals on April 20, 1872.

Yeatman graduated from Georgetown Law School and worked as an examiner for the Bureau of Pensions, as secretary and treasurer of Georgetown's law school and as a deacon for a Baptist church in Washington, D.C. He died at his home on I Street on December 13, 1905.
