= Tom Leahy (baseball) =

American baseball player (1869–1951)

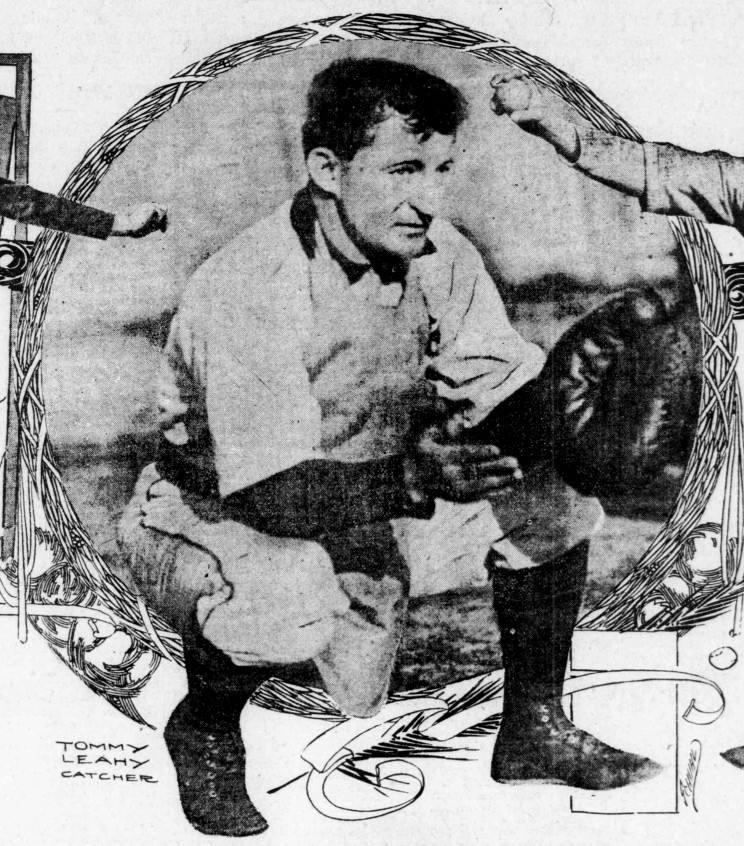
- Catcher
- Born: June 2, 1869; New Haven, Connecticut, U.S.
- Died: June 11, 1951 (aged 82); New Haven, Connecticut, U.S.
- Threw: Right

MLB debut
- May 18, 1897, for the Pittsburgh Pirates

Last MLB appearance
- October 7, 1905, for the St. Louis Cardinals

MLB statistics
- Batting average: .256
- Home runs: 0
- Runs batted in: 42
- Stats at Baseball Reference

Teams
- Pittsburgh Pirates (1897); Washington Senators (1897–98); Milwaukee Brewers (1901); Philadelphia Athletics (1901); St. Louis Cardinals (1905)

Thomas Joseph Leahy (June 2, 1869 – June 11, 1951) was an American professional baseball player. He played all or part of four seasons in Major League Baseball, between 1897 and 1905, for the Pittsburgh Pirates, the Washington Senators, the Milwaukee Brewers, the Philadelphia Athletics, and the St. Louis Cardinals, primarily as a catcher.

== Career ==
Tom Leahy made his professional debut for the Springfield Ponies of the Eastern League. The Ponies, like much of the Eastern League, did not have a working agreement with the major leagues, and operated as a stand alone minor league. Leahy spent the bulk of his rookie season as a back up to Jack Ryan. After appearing in just 34 games as a rookie, Springfield released Ryan and made Leahy the full time catcher. Leahy responded by hitting seven home runs, and stealing 30 bases. Leahy would also spend the 1895 and 1896 seasons in the minors with Springfield.

In 1897, at the age of 28, Leary finally made his major league debut. At an age where most players were establishing themselves, Leahy was a rookie back-up for the hapless Pittsburgh Pirates, which finished with a 60-71-4 record under Patsy Donovan. Leahy wasn't around for the end of the Pirates season, as he ended up with the Washington Senators, another perennial second division team, to finish the season.

It was back to the minors after appearing in just 15 games for Washington in 1898. Leahy was back in the Eastern League, this time playing for Providence. The saving grace was that the Eastern League was now affiliated with the American League. At the age of 32, Leahy finally was back in the majors, again splitting time between two squads. This time, he went from the dreadful Milwaukee Brewers to the Philadelphia Athletics.

1902 found Leahy back in the minor leagues, though at a higher level, playing for the San Francisco Seals of the Pacific Coast League. In 1905, Leahy got his final taste of the majors, appearing in several games for the St. Louis Cardinals. On October 7, 1905, Leahy made his final appearance in the majors. Batting fourth for the Cardinals, Leahy got three hits in four at bats, driving in one run in the Cardinals 6–3 loss vs Cincinnati.

After being let go by St. Louis, Leahy finished his career in the minor leagues, retiring after a 1909 season where he split time between the Indianapolis Indians and Kansas City Blues.

== Personal life ==
Tom Leahy was born in New Haven, Connecticut, in 1869. He attended Holy Cross college. After the end of his baseball career, Leahy returned to New Haven. Leahy died June 11, 1951, at the age of 82.

== Sources ==
- Career statistics from Baseball Reference · Baseball Reference (Minors) · Retrosheet · Baseball Almanac
