= Frank Foreman =

American baseball player (1863–1957)

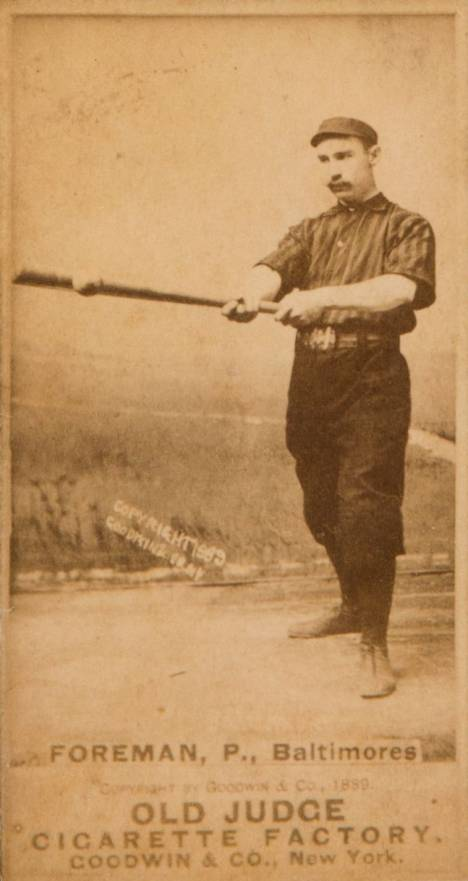
- 1889 baseball card of Foreman
- Pitcher
- Born: May 1, 1863; Baltimore, Maryland, U.S.
- Died: November 19, 1957 (aged 94); Baltimore, Maryland, U.S.
- Batted: Right Threw: Right

MLB debut
- May 15, 1884, for the Chicago Browns

Last MLB appearance
- May 10, 1902, for the Baltimore Orioles

MLB statistics
- Win–loss record: 96–93
- Earned run average: 3.97
- Strikeouts: 586
- Stats at Baseball Reference

Teams
- Chicago Browns/Pittsburgh Stogies (1884); Kansas City Cowboys (1884); Baltimore Orioles (1885, 1889); Cincinnati Reds (1890); Washington Statesmen/Senators (1891–1892); Baltimore Orioles (1892); New York Giants (1893); Cincinnati Reds (1895–1896); Boston Americans (1901); Baltimore Orioles (1901–1902)

Francis Isaiah Foreman (May 1, 1863 – November 19, 1957) was an American pitcher who played professional baseball from 1884 to 1905. He played for eight different major league teams. Listed at 6 ft 0 in (1.83 m), 160 lb., Foreman batted and threw right-handed. He was nicknamed "Monkey".

== Professional baseball career ==
Foreman was born in Baltimore in 1863. He started his professional baseball career in 1884. That year, he played in the Eastern League and Union Association.

In 1885, Foreman played in the Eastern League and American Association.

In 1887, Foreman played in the Ohio State League.

In 1888, Foreman played for the Albany Governors of the International Association. He pitched 328 innings and had a 9–24 win–loss record with a 2.96 earned run average (ERA) and 127 strikeouts.

In 1889, Foreman played for the American Association's Baltimore Orioles. In 414 innings pitched, he had a 23–21 record, a 3.52 ERA, and 180 strikeouts. The 23 wins were his career-high in the major leagues.

The National League's Cincinnati Reds purchased Foreman from the Orioles in March 1890. That year, he went 13–10 with a 3.95 ERA and 57 strikeouts.

In 1891, Foreman moved to the Washington Statesmen of the American Association. He pitched 345.1 innings and went 18–20 with a 3.73 ERA and 170 strikeouts.

In 1892, Foreman played in the National League and Eastern League.

In 1893, Foreman played in the Southern Association, Pennsylvania State League, and National League.

In 1894, Foreman played for the Toledo White Stockings of the Western League. In 374.1 innings pitched, he went 21–19 with a 3.39 ERA. He led the league with 190 strikeouts.

In 1895, Foreman played for the National League's Cincinnati Reds. He went 11–14 with a 4.11 ERA and 55 strikeouts.

Foreman stayed with the Reds in 1896 and went 14–7 with a 3.97 ERA and 33 strikeouts.

In 1897, Foreman played for the Indianapolis Indians of the Western League. He pitched 332.1 innings and went 30–9 with a 1.87 ERA and 79 strikeouts. His 30 wins led the league and were his career-high in professional baseball.

In 1898, Foreman played for the Western League's Indianapolis Hoosiers. In 328 innings pitched, he went 24–11 with 104 strikeouts.

Foreman stayed with the Hoosiers in 1899.

In 1900, Foreman played in the Eastern League and American League.

Foreman signed with the Boston Americans of the American League in April 1901. He played briefly for the Americans before the team released him in May. In June, Foreman signed with the American League's Baltimore Orioles. With the Orioles, he went 12–6 with a 3.67 ERA and 41 strikeouts.

In 1902, Foreman played in the American League, Western League, and American Association.

In 1904, Foreman played in the Tri-State League.

In 1905, his last year in professional baseball, Foreman played in the Tri-State League and Connecticut State League.

Foreman won over 200 games in professional baseball. In the major leagues, he had a 96–93 win–loss record, a 3.97 ERA, and 586 strikeouts.

As of 2021, Foreman ranks 26th all-time among major league pitchers in career hit batsmen, with 142. In 1889, he led the American Association with 40 hit batsmen. In 1891, he ranked second in the American Association with 43 hit batsmen.

== Later life ==
Foreman's younger brother, Brownie Foreman, was also a major league pitcher.

After his playing career was over, Frank Foreman scouted for several teams. He discovered future Baseball Hall of Famer Eddie Plank while Plank was pitching at Gettysburg College.

Foreman died in Baltimore in 1957, at the age of 94. He was the last living player from the 1885 Major League Season
