= Dale Gear =

American baseball player (1872–1951)

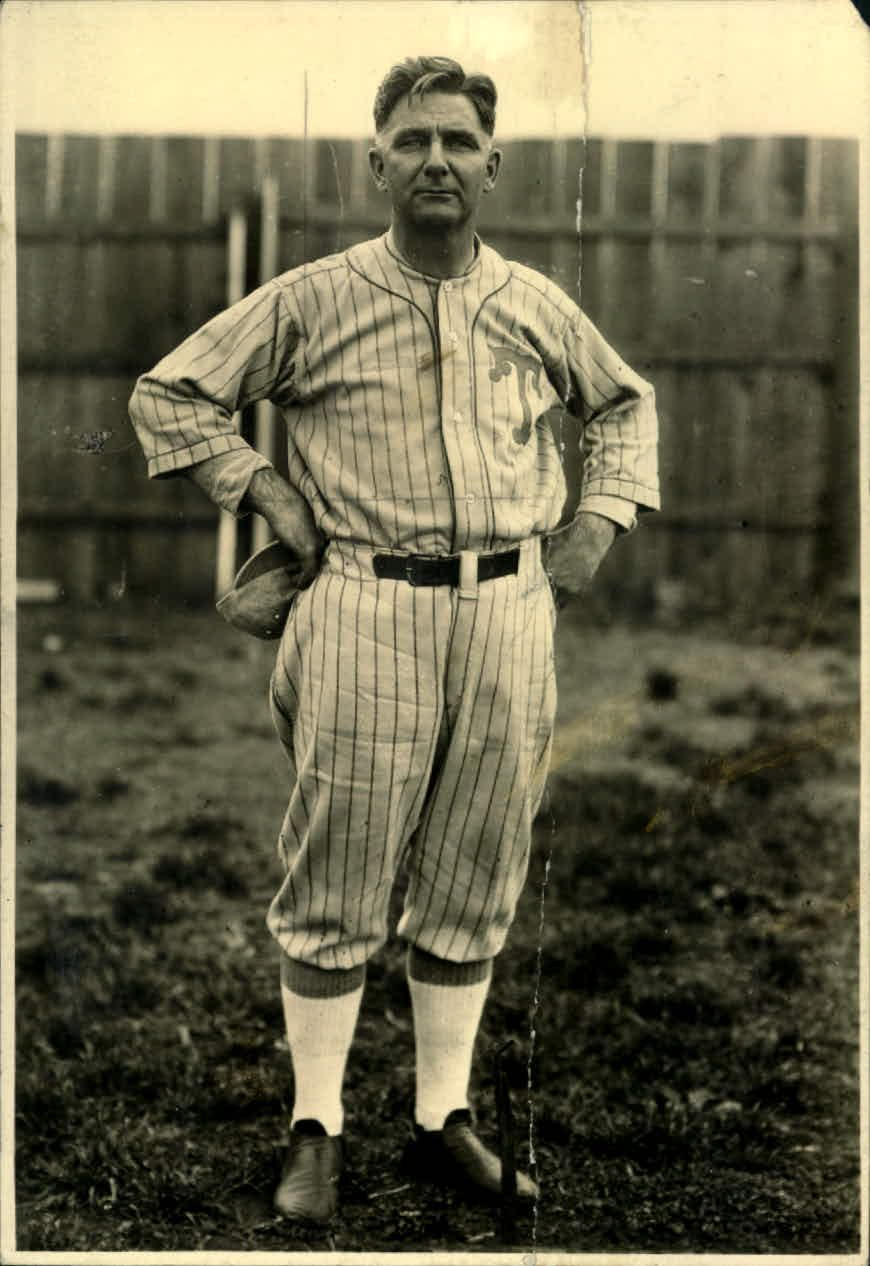
- Pitcher
- Born: February 2, 1872; Lone Elm, Kansas
- Died: September 23, 1951 (aged 79); Topeka, Kansas
- Batted: Right Threw: Right

MLB debut
- August 15, 1896, for the Cleveland Spiders

Last MLB appearance
- September 26, 1901, for the Washington Senators

MLB statistics
- Win–loss record: 4–13
- Strikeouts: 41
- Earned run average: 4.21
- Stats at Baseball Reference

Teams
- Cleveland Spiders (1896, 1897); Washington Senators (1901)

Dale Darwin (or perhaps Dudley) Gear (February 2, 1872 – September 23, 1951) was a Major League Baseball pitcher and outfielder. He played parts of three seasons in the majors, 1896 and 1897 for the Cleveland Spiders and 1901 for the Washington Senators. Gear was the first Major League Baseball player produced by the Kansas Jayhawks baseball program.
