= Hugh Duffy =

American baseball player and manager (1866–1954)

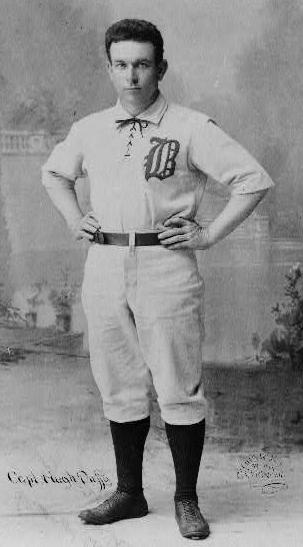
- Outfielder / Manager
- Born: November 26, 1866; Cranston, Rhode Island, U.S.
- Died: October 19, 1954 (aged 87); Boston, Massachusetts, U.S.
- Batted: Right Threw: Right

Major league debut
- June 23, 1888, for the Chicago White Stockings

Last major league appearance
- April 13, 1906, for the Philadelphia Phillies

Major league statistics
- Batting average: .326
- Hits: 2,293
- Home runs: 106
- Runs batted in: 1,302
- Stolen bases: 574
- Managerial record: 535–671
- Winning %: .444
- Stats at Baseball Reference
- Managerial record at Baseball Reference

Teams
- As player: Chicago White Stockings (1888–1889); Chicago Pirates (1890); Boston Reds (1891); Boston Beaneaters (1892–1900); Milwaukee Brewers (1901); Philadelphia Phillies (1904–1906); As manager: Milwaukee Brewers (1901); Philadelphia Phillies (1904–1906); Chicago White Sox (1910–1911); Boston Red Sox (1921–1922)

Career highlights and awards
- NL Triple Crown (1894); NL batting champion (1894); 2× NL home run leader (1894, 1897); NL record .440 batting average, single season; Braves Hall of Fame

Member of the National

Baseball Hall of Fame
- Induction: 1945
- Election method: Old-Timers Committee

Hugh Duffy (November 26, 1866 – October 19, 1954) was an American professional baseball outfielder and manager. He was a player or player-manager for the Chicago White Stockings, Chicago Pirates, Boston Reds, Boston Beaneaters, Milwaukee Brewers and Philadelphia Phillies between 1888 and 1906. He had his best years with the Beaneaters, including the 1894 season, when he set the National League single-season record for batting average (.440), a record that has stood for over a century.

He also managed the Chicago White Sox and Boston Red Sox and spent several seasons coaching in collegiate baseball and in the minor leagues. Later in life, he spent many years as a scout for the Red Sox. In 1945, Duffy was elected to the Baseball Hall of Fame. He worked for Boston until 1953. He died of heart problems the next year.

== Early life ==
Duffy in 1921

Duffy was born in Cranston, Rhode Island to Irish immigrant Michael Duffy and wife Margaret Duffy. He was a textile mill worker who had taken up semi-pro baseball for weekend diversion. He played a couple years of minor league ball in the New England League before moving to the majors, starting up in the league's initial season of 1886, and playing on clubs in Hartford, Springfield and Salem, as well as the Lowell, Massachusetts team in 1887.

== Playing career ==
Duffy entered the National League with Cap Anson's Chicago White Stockings in 1888 after receiving an offer of $2,000 from the club. Anson initially was unimpressed with the 5 ft 7 in (1.70 m), 150 pound Duffy, telling him, "We already have a batboy." He shortly thereafter earned the reputation of an outstanding outfielder and powerful hitter. Duffy ended up replacing Billy Sunday as the team's regular right fielder. He switched leagues, joining the American Association's Boston Reds in 1891; he then returned to the NL with the Boston Beaneaters in 1892, where he enjoyed his best seasons.

From 1891 through 1900, Duffy knocked in 100 runs or more eight times. In 1894 Duffy had one of the greatest seasons in baseball history, winning the National League Triple Crown by leading the league with 18 home runs, 145 RBIs, and a .440 batting average. Duffy's .440 average is the National League's single-season batting average record. At one point during the season, Duffy had a 26-game hitting streak. During his time with Boston, Duffy and Tommy McCarthy forged a reputation as the celebrated “Heavenly Twins” outfield of the early 1890s. Both Heavenly Twins were named to the Hall of Fame.

He was player-manager for the Milwaukee Brewers in 1901. During the 1902 and 1903 seasons, Duffy was player-manager for the Western League's Milwaukee Creams franchise.

Duffy was a player-manager for the Phillies from 1904 to 1906. He finished his career in 1906 with 106 home runs which was, at the time, one of the highest career totals.

== Post-playing career ==
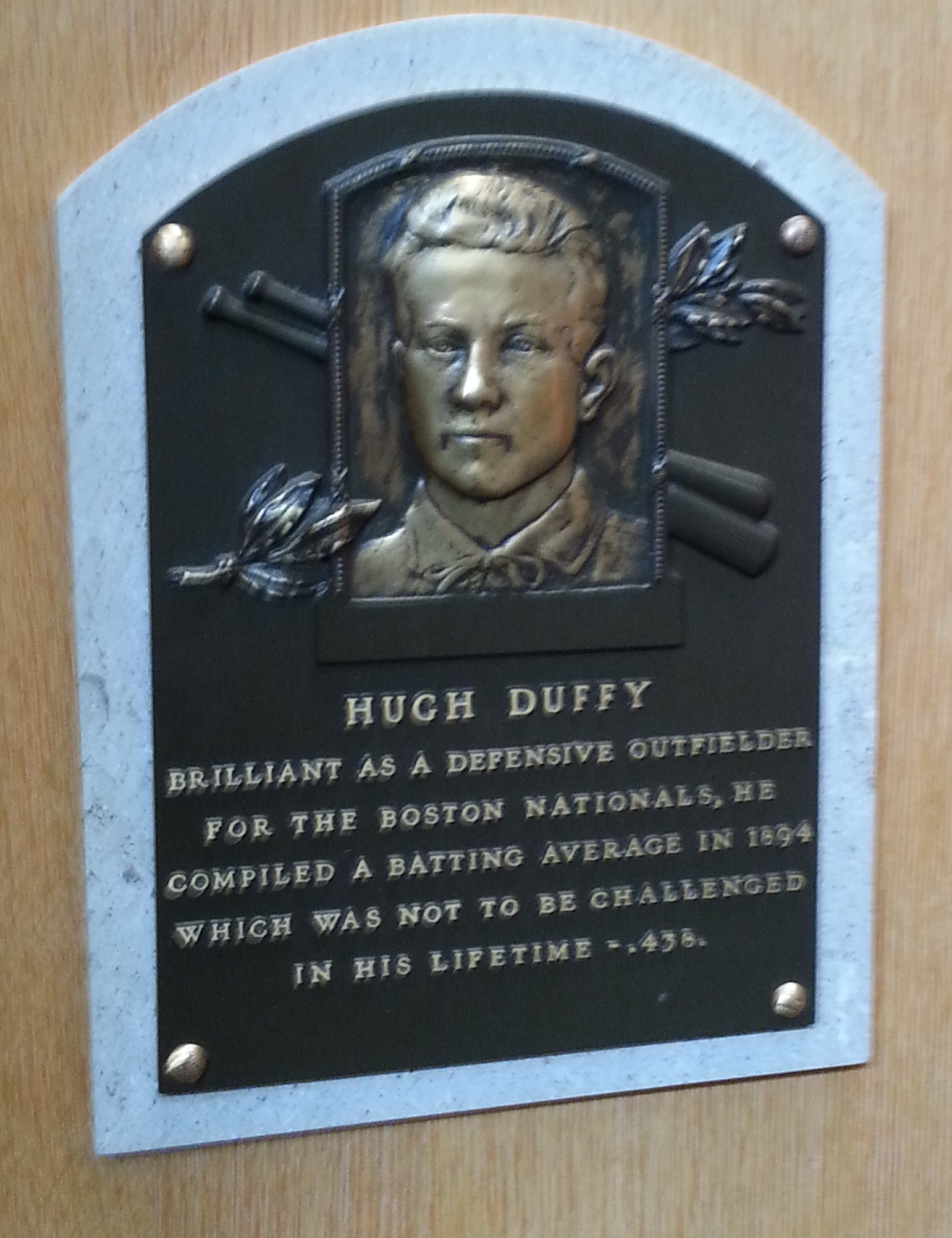
Duffy's plaque at the Baseball Hall of Fame

Duffy spent three years (1907–1909) as manager of the Providence Grays. He made $2,000 in his last season as the Providence manager and The Evening News in Providence wrote that Duffy was paid hundreds of dollars less than any other manager in the Eastern League. During Duffy's three seasons, Providence finished in third place, second place and third place, respectively.

Duffy agreed to manage the Chicago White Sox in 1910. He stayed with the team in 1911. He moved to the Milwaukee Brewers of the American Association in 1912, but he was fired after a season in which the team struggled. He turned down an offer to manage the 1913 St. Paul Saints, saying that he was hoping to work in the east. He wound up in Portland, Maine, where he founded and managed a minor league club that became known as the Portland Duffs in his honor. He coached the Harvard varsity and freshman baseball squads from 1917 through 1919. He also managed the 1920 Toronto Maple Leafs of the International League to a .701 winning percentage—the best in the team's 83-year history, but only good enough for second place in the league.

In 1921, Duffy was hired as full-time manager of the Red Sox, guiding them for two seasons. Duffy then became a scout for the Red Sox in 1924. From 1928 to 1930, Duffy was the head baseball coach at Boston College.

== Managerial record ==
Team	Year	Regular season					Postseason			
Team	Year	Games	Won	Lost	Win %	Finish	Won	Lost	Win %	Result
MIL	1901	137	48	89	.419	8th in AL	–	–	–	–
MIL total		137	48	89	.419		0	0	–	
PHI	1904	152	52	100	.342	8th in NL	–	–	–	–
PHI	1905	152	83	69	.546	4th in NL	–	–	–	–
PHI	1906	153	71	82	.464	4th in NL	–	–	–	–
PHI total		457	206	251	.451		0	0	–	
CWS	1910	153	68	85	.444	6th in AL	–	–	–	–
CWS	1911	151	77	74	.510	5th in AL	–	–	–	–
CWS total		304	145	159	.477		0	0	–	
BOS	1921	154	75	79	.487	5th in AL	–	–	–	–
BOS	1922	154	61	93	.396	8th in AL	–	–	–	–
BOS total		308	136	172	.442		0	0	–	
Total		1206	535	671	.444		0	0	–	

== Later life ==
Duffy was elected to the Baseball Hall of Fame in 1945.

Duffy remained on the Red Sox' scouting staff nearly to the end of his life, retiring in 1953. He died in Boston on October 19, 1954. He had been suffering from heart problems. Duffy's wife Nora died the previous year; they did not have children.

== Posthumously ==
In 2019, Duffy was inducted into the Ivan Allen Jr. Braves Museum and Hall of Fame, along with Terry Pendleton.

== See also ==
- Major League Baseball Triple Crown
- List of Major League Baseball batting champions
- List of Major League Baseball annual runs batted in leaders
- List of Major League Baseball annual home run leaders
- List of Major League Baseball annual doubles leaders
- List of Major League Baseball annual runs scored leaders
- List of Major League Baseball career stolen bases leaders
- List of Major League Baseball player-managers

Sporting positions
Preceded by N/A	Boston Red Sox first-base coach 1939	Succeeded by Moe Berg
