= Bill Reidy =

American baseball player (1873–1915)

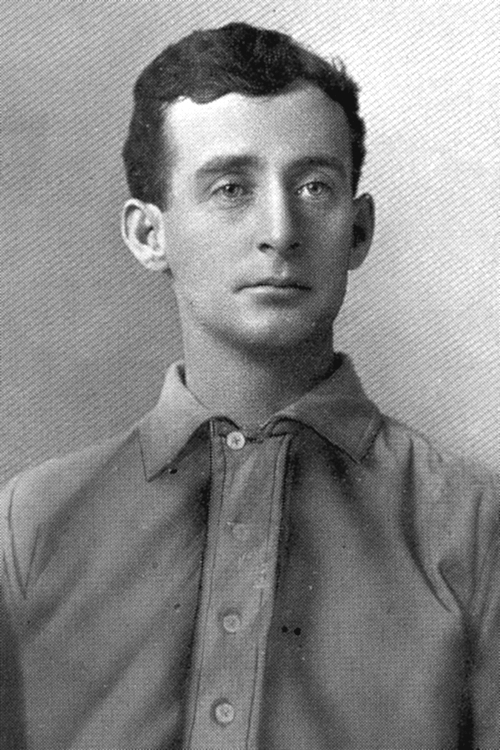
- Pitcher
- Born: October 9, 1873; Cleveland, Ohio, U.S.
- Died: October 14, 1915 (aged 42); Cleveland, Ohio, U.S.
- Batted: Right Threw: Right

MLB debut
- July 21, 1896, for the New York Giants

Last MLB appearance
- July 1, 1904, for the Brooklyn Superbas

MLB statistics
- Win–loss record: 27-41
- Earned run average: 4.17
- Strikeouts: 109
- Stats at Baseball Reference

Teams
- New York Giants (1896); Brooklyn Superbas (1899); Milwaukee Brewers/St.Louis Browns (1901–1903); Brooklyn Superbas (1903–1904)

William Joseph Reide (October 9, 1873 – October 14, 1915) was an American professional baseball player. He played from 1896 to 1904.

Reide was a native of Cleveland, Ohio, where he also died and was buried.
