= Wiley Piatt =

American baseball player (1874–1946)

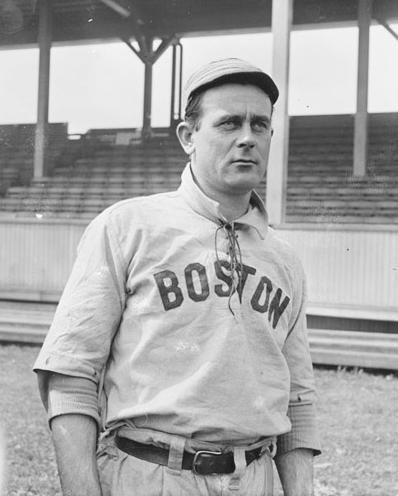
- Pitcher
- Born: July 13, 1874; Blue Creek, Ohio, U.S.
- Died: September 20, 1946 (aged 72); Cincinnati, Ohio, U.S.
- Batted: Left Threw: Left

MLB debut
- April 22, 1898, for the Philadelphia Phillies

Last MLB appearance
- August 1, 1903, for the Boston Beaneaters

MLB statistics
- Win–loss record: 86–79
- Earned run average: 3.60
- Strikeouts: 517
- Stats at Baseball Reference

Teams
- Philadelphia Phillies (1898–1900); Philadelphia Athletics (1901); Chicago White Sox (1901–1902); Boston Beaneaters (1903)

Wiley Harold Piatt (July 13, 1874 – September 20, 1946) was an American professional baseball player who played pitcher in the Major Leagues from 1898 to 1903. He played for the Philadelphia Phillies, Philadelphia Athletics, Chicago White Sox, and Boston Beaneaters.

Piatt was the only pitcher in the 20th century to pitch two complete games in one day and lose them both. This occurred on June 25, 1903, when, pitching for the Beaneaters, he lost to the St. Louis Cardinals by scores of 1-0 and 5-3.
