= Casey Patten =

American baseball player (1874–1935)

Case Patten
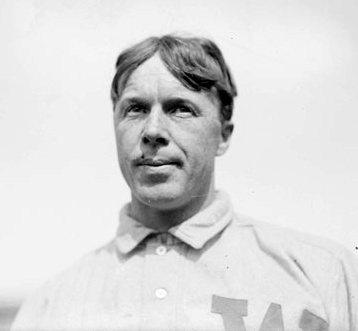
- Pitcher
- Born: May 7, 1874; Westport, New York, U.S.
- Died: May 31, 1935 (aged 61); Rochester, New York, U.S.
- Batted: Both Threw: Left

MLB debut
- May 4, 1901, for the Washington Senators

Last MLB appearance
- June 18, 1908, for the Boston Red Sox

MLB statistics
- Pitching record: 105–128
- Earned run average: 3.36
- Strikeouts: 757
- Stats at Baseball Reference

Teams
- Washington Senators (1901–1908); Boston Red Sox (1908)

Case Lyman "Casey" Patten (May 7, 1874 – May 31, 1935) was an American professional baseball player. He was a left-handed pitcher over parts of eight seasons (1901–1908) with the Washington Senators and Boston Red Sox. For his career, he compiled a 105–128 record in 270 appearances, with a 3.36 earned run average and 757 strikeouts.

In the history of the Washington/Minnesota franchise, Patten ranks tenth in wins (105), sixth in innings pitched (2059.3), tenth in games started (237), second in complete games (206), sixth in hits allowed (2146), and seventh in losses (127).

He was born in Westport, New York and later died in Rochester, New York at the age of 61.

== See also ==
- List of Major League Baseball annual saves leaders
