= Milwaukee Brewers (1894–1901) =

American professional baseball team

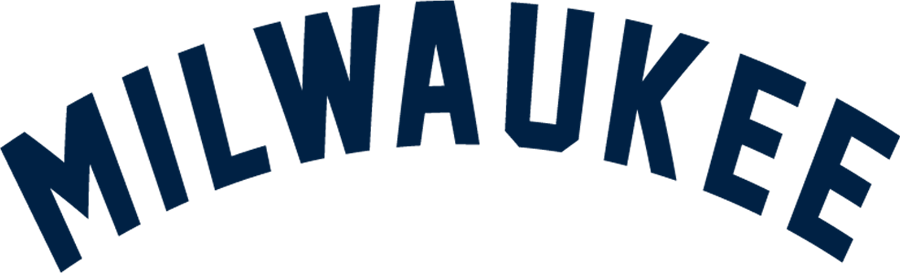
Logo
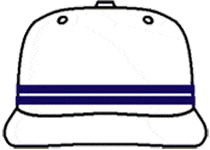
Cap insignia

Information
- League: American League (1901)
- Location: Milwaukee, Wisconsin
- Ballpark: Lloyd Street Grounds (1895–1901)
- Established: 1894
- Relocated: 1901 (to St. Louis; became the St. Louis Browns)
- Former leagues: Minor league: American League (1900); Western League (1894–1899)
- Former ballpark: Athletic Park (1894)
- Colors: Navy, White
- Ownership: Henry Killilea (1894–1901)
- Manager: List of managers: Charlie Cushman (1894); Larry Twitchell (1895–1896); Bob Glenalvin (1896); Connie Mack (1897–1900); Hugh Duffy (1901)

The Milwaukee Brewers of 1894–1901 were an American professional baseball team. They competed as members of the Western League from 1894 to 1899, then as members of the American League in 1900 and 1901. Both leagues were considered minor leagues during those seasons, except for 1901 when the American League declared itself a major league.

== History ==
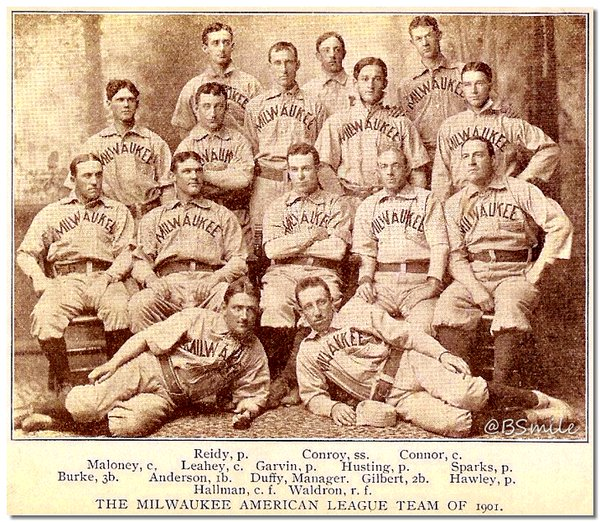
The 1901 Milwaukee Brewers

The Western League had previously operated for multiple seasons between 1885 and 1892. It reorganized in November 1893, then operated continuously from 1894 through 1899, during which the Brewers competed. The league renamed itself the American League for the 1900 season, during which the Brewers again competed. Connie Mack, who later managed the Philadelphia Athletics for 50 years, managed the team for four seasons, 1897–1900.

Prior to the 1901 season, the American League declared itself a major league, competing for players and revenue against the only other major league in operation at the time, the National League. Owned by Henry Killilea, the Brewers were led by player-manager Hugh Duffy that season and finished last in the eight-team league. The team played at Lloyd Street Grounds, between 16th and 18th Streets in Milwaukee.

Prior to the 1902 season, the Brewers were relocated to St. Louis and renamed the St. Louis Browns. That franchise played in St. Louis through the 1953 season, then relocated again to become the Baltimore Orioles.

After the major-league team left Milwaukee following the 1901 season, a minor-league Milwaukee Brewers franchise competed in the American Association from 1902 through 1952.

== Season records ==
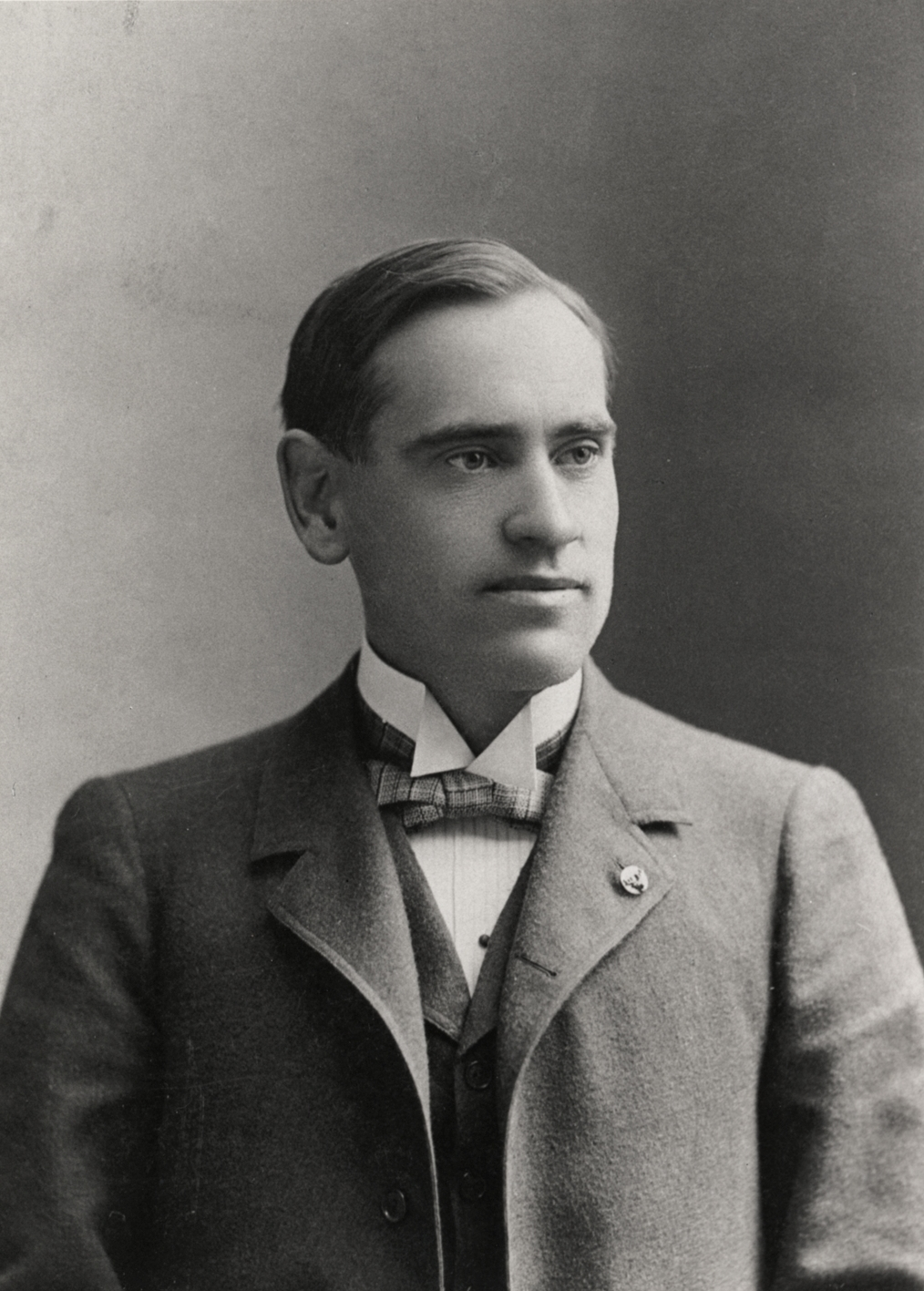
Bob Glenalvin, manager during part of the 1896 season

Season	League	Class.	Manager(s)	Record	Finish	Ref
1894	Western League	A	Charlie Cushman	47–74 (.388)	8th of 8	
1895	Western League	A	Larry Twitchell	57–67 (.460)	6th of 8	
1896	Western League	A	Larry Twitchell / Bob Glenalvin	62–78 (.443)	6th of 8	
1897	Western League	A	Connie Mack	85–50 (.630)	3rd of 8	
1898	Western League	A	Connie Mack	82–57 (.590)	3rd of 8	
1899	Western League	A	Connie Mack	55–68 (.447)	6th of 8	
1900	American League	A	Connie Mack	79–58 (.577)	2nd of 8	
1901	American League	Major	Hugh Duffy	48–89 (.350)	8th of 8	

== See also ==
- History of the Baltimore Orioles
- History of professional baseball in Milwaukee
