= 1901 Philadelphia Athletics season =

1901 Philadelphia Athletics
- League: American League
- Ballpark: Columbia Park
- City: Philadelphia
- Record: 74–62 (.544)
- League place: 4th
- Owners: Benjamin Shibe, Tom Shibe, John Shibe, Connie Mack, Sam Jones, Frank Hough
- Managers: Connie Mack

The 1901 Philadelphia Athletics season involved the A's finishing fourth in the American League with a record of 74 wins and 62 losses. The franchise that would become the modern Athletics originated in 1901 as a new franchise in the American League.

== Before the 1901 season ==
The Western League had been renamed the American League in 1900 by league president Bancroft (Ban) Johnson, and declared itself the second major league in 1901.

In 1901, Johnson created new franchises in the east and eliminated some franchises in the west. Philadelphia seems to have been a new franchise created to compete with the National League's Philadelphia Phillies. Former catcher Connie Mack was recruited to manage the club. Mack in turn persuaded Phillies minority owner Ben Shibe as well as others to invest in the team, which would be called the Philadelphia Athletics. He himself bought a 25 percent interest.

== Regular season ==
In 1901, Nap Lajoie jumped from the Phillies to the crosstown Philadelphia Athletics, owned by Connie Mack. Lajoie's batting average that year was .426, still a league record. The same year Lajoie became the second major leaguer to be intentionally walked with the bases loaded after Abner Dalrymple in 1881.

=== Season standings ===
American League
Team	W	L	Pct.	GB	Home	Road
Chicago White Stockings	83	53	.610	—	49‍–‍21	34‍–‍32
Boston Americans	79	57	.581	4	49‍–‍20	30‍–‍37
Detroit Tigers	74	61	.548	8½	42‍–‍27	32‍–‍34
Philadelphia Athletics	74	62	.544	9	42‍–‍24	32‍–‍38
Baltimore Orioles	68	65	.511	13½	40‍–‍25	28‍–‍40
Washington Senators	61	72	.459	20½	31‍–‍35	30‍–‍37
Cleveland Blues	54	82	.397	29	28‍–‍39	26‍–‍43
Milwaukee Brewers	48	89	.350	35½	32‍–‍37	16‍–‍52

=== Record vs. opponents ===
1901 American League record Sources:
Team	BAL	BOS	CWS	CLE	DET	MIL	PHA	WSH
Baltimore	—	9–9	4–14–1	11–9	9–10	12–7–1	12–8	11–8
Boston	9–9	—	12–8	12–6	9–11–1	15–5	10–10	12–8–1
Chicago	14–4–1	8–12	—	13–7	10–10	16–4	12–8	10–8
Cleveland	9–11	6–12	7–13	—	6–14	11–9	6–14	9–9–2
Detroit	10–9	11–9–1	10–10	14–6	—	13–7	7–9	9–11
Milwaukee	7–12–1	5–15	4–16	9–11	7–13	—	6–14	10–8–1
Philadelphia	8–12	10–10	8–12	14–6	9–7	14–6	—	11–9–1
Washington	8–11	8–12–1	8–10	9–9–2	11–9	8–10–1	9–11–1	—

=== Notable transactions ===
- June 1901: Tom Leahy was signed as a free agent by the Athletics.
- July 1901: Tom Leahy was acquired from the Athletics by the Providence Grays.
- July 20, 1901: Snake Wiltse was signed as a free agent by the Athletics.

=== Roster ===
1901 Philadelphia Athletics
Roster
Pitchers: Bock Baker; Bill Bernhard; Chick Fraser; Dummy Leitner; Pete Loos; John McPherson; Billy Milligan; Wiley Piatt; Eddie Plank; Snake Wiltse	Catchers: Morgan Murphy; Doc Powers; Harry Smith; Farmer Steelman; Infielders: Charlie Carr; Lave Cross; Harry Davis; Joe Dolan; Bones Ely; Nap Lajoie; Billy Lauder; Harry Lochhead; Bob McKinney	Outfielders: Dave Fultz; Phil Geier; Jack Hayden; Fred Ketcham; Tom Leahy; Bob Lindemann; Matty McIntyre; Socks Seybold	Manager: Connie Mack

== Player stats ==
=== Batting ===
==== Starters by position ====
Note: Pos = Position; G = Games played; AB = At bats; H = Hits; Avg. = Batting average; HR = Home runs; RBI = Runs batted in

Pos	Player	G	AB	H	Avg.	HR	RBI
C	Doc Powers	116	431	108	.251	1	47
1B	Harry Davis	117	496	152	.306	8	76
2B	Nap Lajoie	131	544	232	.426	14	125
3B	Lave Cross	100	424	139	.328	2	73
SS	Joe Dolan	98	338	73	.216	1	38
OF	Socks Seybold	114	449	150	.334	8	90
OF	Matty McIntyre	82	308	85	.276	0	46
OF	Dave Fultz	132	561	164	.292	0	52

==== Other batters ====
Note: G = Games played; AB = At bats; H = Hits; Avg. = Batting average; HR = Home runs; RBI = Runs batted in

Player	G	AB	H	Avg.	HR	RBI
Phil Geier	50	211	49	.232	0	23
Jack Hayden	51	211	56	.265	0	17
Bones Ely	45	171	37	.216	0	16
Farmer Steelman	27	88	23	.261	0	7
Harry Smith	11	34	11	.324	0	3
Harry Lochhead	9	34	3	.088	0	2
Morgan Murphy	9	28	6	.214	0	6
Fred Ketchum	5	22	5	.227	0	2
Tom Leahy	5	15	5	.333	0	1
Bob Lindemann	3	9	1	.111	0	0
Charlie Carr	2	8	1	.125	0	0
Billy Lauder	2	8	1	.125	0	0
Bob McKinney	2	2	0	.000	0	0

=== Pitching ===
==== Starting pitchers ====
Note: G = Games pitched; IP = Innings pitched; W = Wins; L = Losses; ERA = Earned run average; SO = Strikeouts

Player	G	IP	W	L	ERA	SO
Chick Fraser	40	331.0	22	16	3.81	110
Eddie Plank	33	260.2	17	13	3.31	90
Bill Bernhard	31	257.0	17	10	4.52	58
Snake Wiltse	19	166.0	13	5	3.58	40
Wiley Piatt	18	140.0	5	12	4.63	45
Bock Baker	1	6.0	0	1	10.50	1
John McPherson	1	4.0	0	1	11.25	0
Pete Loos	1	1.0	0	1	27.00	0

==== Other pitchers ====
Note: G = Games pitched; IP = Innings pitched; W = Wins; L = Losses; ERA = Earned run average; SO = Strikeouts

Player	G	IP	W	L	ERA	SO
Billy Milligan	6	33.0	0	3	4.36	5

==== Relief pitchers ====
Note: G = Games pitched; W = Wins; L = Losses; SV = Saves; ERA = Earned run average; SO = Strikeouts

Player	G	W	L	SV	ERA	SO
Dummy Leitner	1	0	0	0	0.00	1
