= May 1901 =

Month in 1901

<<	May 1901					>>
Su	Mo	Tu	We	Th	Fr	Sa
			1	2	3	4
5	6	7	8	9	10	11
12	13	14	15	16	17	18
19	20	21	22	23	24	25
26	27	28	29	30	31

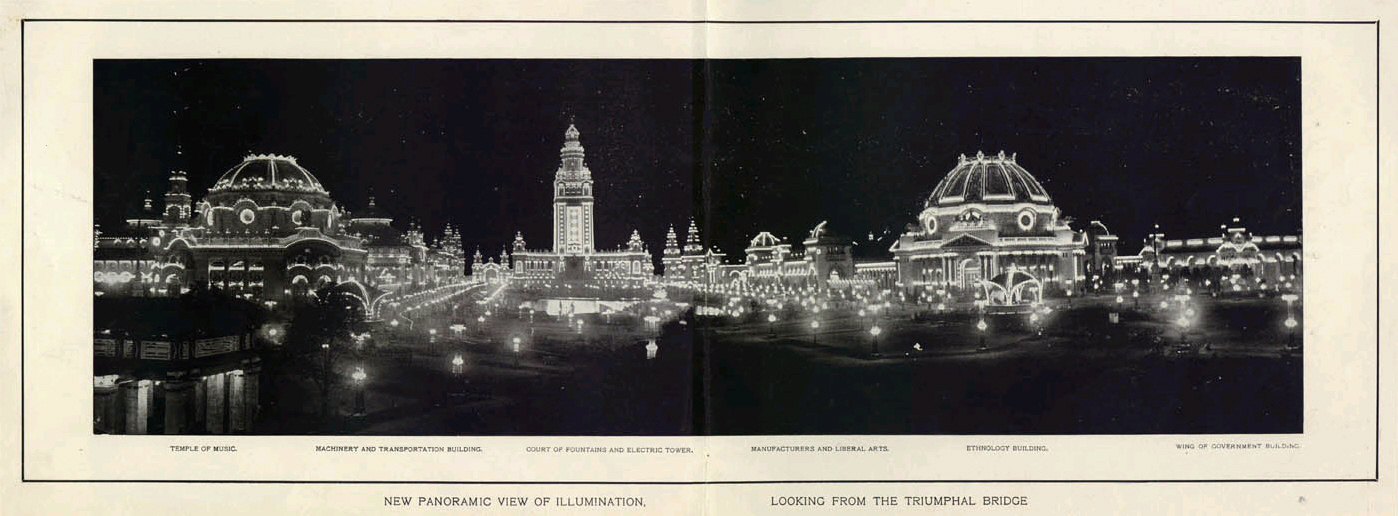
May 1, 1901: Pan-American Exposition opens in Buffalo

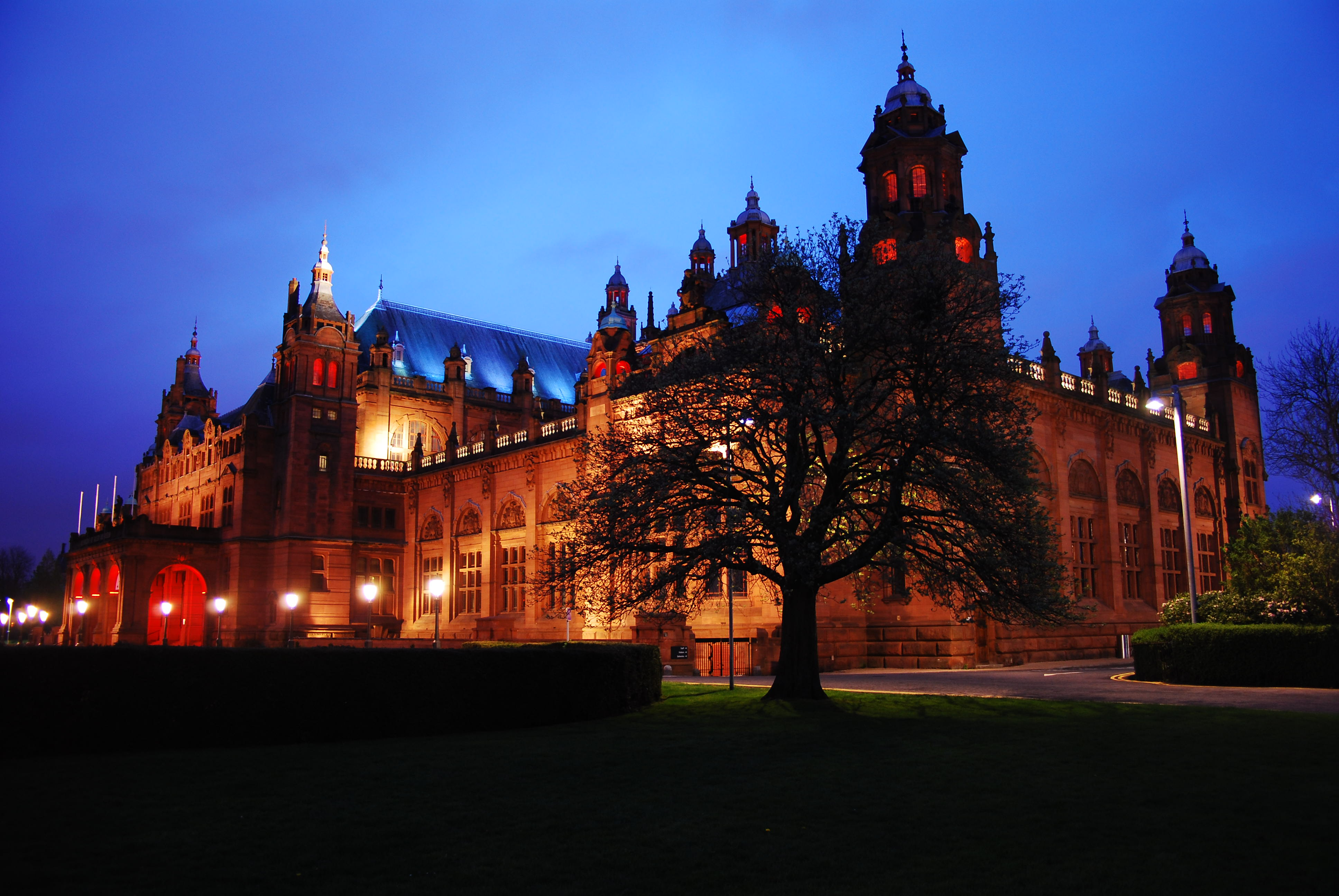
May 2, 1901: Glasgow International Exposition opens in Scotland

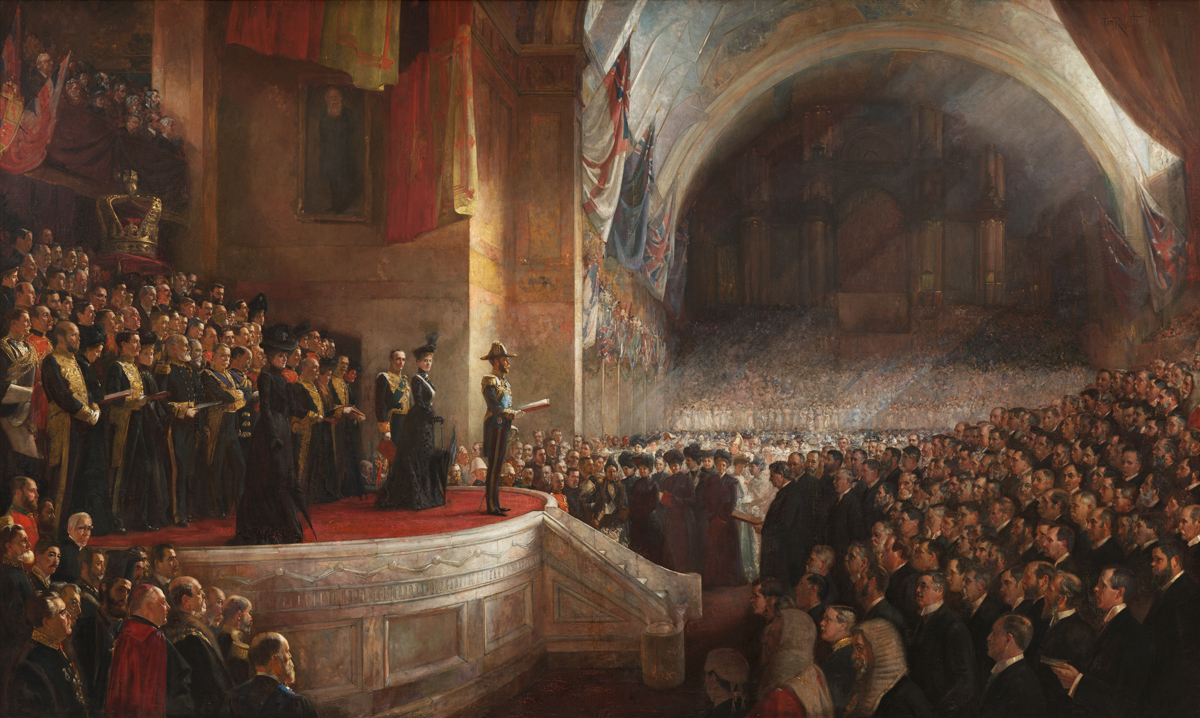
May 9, 1901: The first Parliament of Australia is opened by the Duke of Cornwall and York, the Crown Prince George

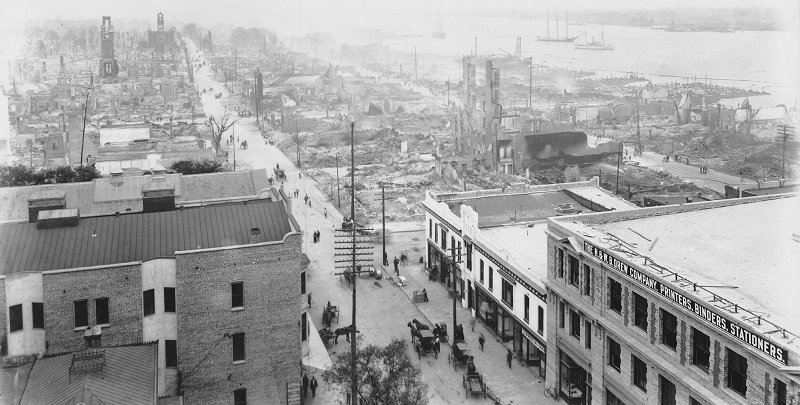
May 3, 1901: Jacksonville, Florida, destroyed

The following events occurred in May 1901:

== May 1, 1901 (Wednesday) ==
- Prince Itō Hirobumi resigned as Prime Minister of Japan, along with almost all of his cabinet, after the Finance Minister, Viscount Watanabe Kunitake, announced that his department would have to postpone public works projects indefinitely. The only member of the cabinet not to quit was the Minister of War, Baron Kodama Gentarō.
- The Pan-American Exposition opened in Buffalo, New York.
- William McKinley became the first President of the United States to tour the Deep South, speaking at Mississippi before stopping for the night at New Orleans.
- Born:
  - Sterling Allen Brown, African-American poet and folklorist, in Washington, D.C. (d. 1989)
  - Hotsumi Ozaki, Japanese journalist and spy for the Soviet Union during World War II, in Shiba, Tokyo (d. 1944, executed)
- Died:
  - Rousseau Owen Crump, 57, U.S. Representative for Michigan since 1895 (b. 1843)
  - Lewis Waterman, 64, American inventor, created the first practical fountain pen and founded the Waterman Pen Company (b. 1836)

== May 2, 1901 (Thursday) ==
- In Scotland, the Glasgow International Exhibition opened.
- Refined crude oil was delivered by pipeline for the first time to the Eastern seaboard in the United States, as the Standard Oil Company's "United States Pipe Line" began operation. Construction of the line, which started at the oil fields in Titusville, Pennsylvania, and ran to Philadelphia, took nine years to complete.
- In Berlin, the musical score for the ballet Aschenbrödel (Cinderella), which Johann Strauss had been working on when he died in 1899, was performed for the first time, after being completed and modified by composer Josef Bayer. On the same day in Berlin, another ballet whose score Bayer had composed, Die Braut von Korea ("The Korean Bride"), closed after a four-year run; Gustav Mahler would describe it as "one of the most stupid ballets ever to have been staged".
- Two future members of the Baseball Hall of Fame played key roles in the first forfeited baseball game in American League history, as the Chicago White Stockings hosted the Detroit Tigers. Chicago had a 5–2 lead going into the final inning, but Detroit scored five runs in the ninth; with rain clouds gathering, Chicago pitcher (and team manager) Clark Griffith tried to stall the game down "hoping that rain would wipe out the top of the inning, and the game's score would revert to the eight inning, resulting in a Sox win." "But their delays were so palpable and so clumsily done," the Chicago Tribune would report the next day, "that everyone could see the purpose." Umpire Tom Connolly ordered a forfeit, and Detroit was declared a 9–0 winner under baseball rules.
- Born: Willi Bredel, East German author (d. 1964)

== May 3, 1901 (Friday) ==
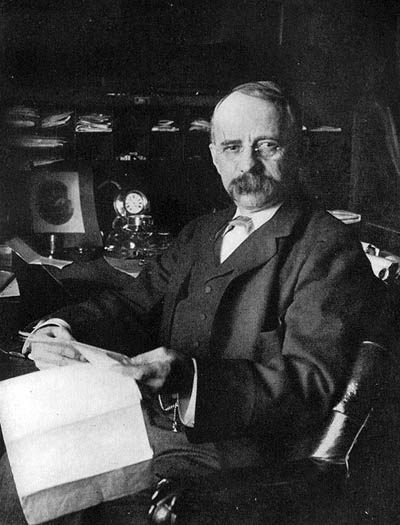
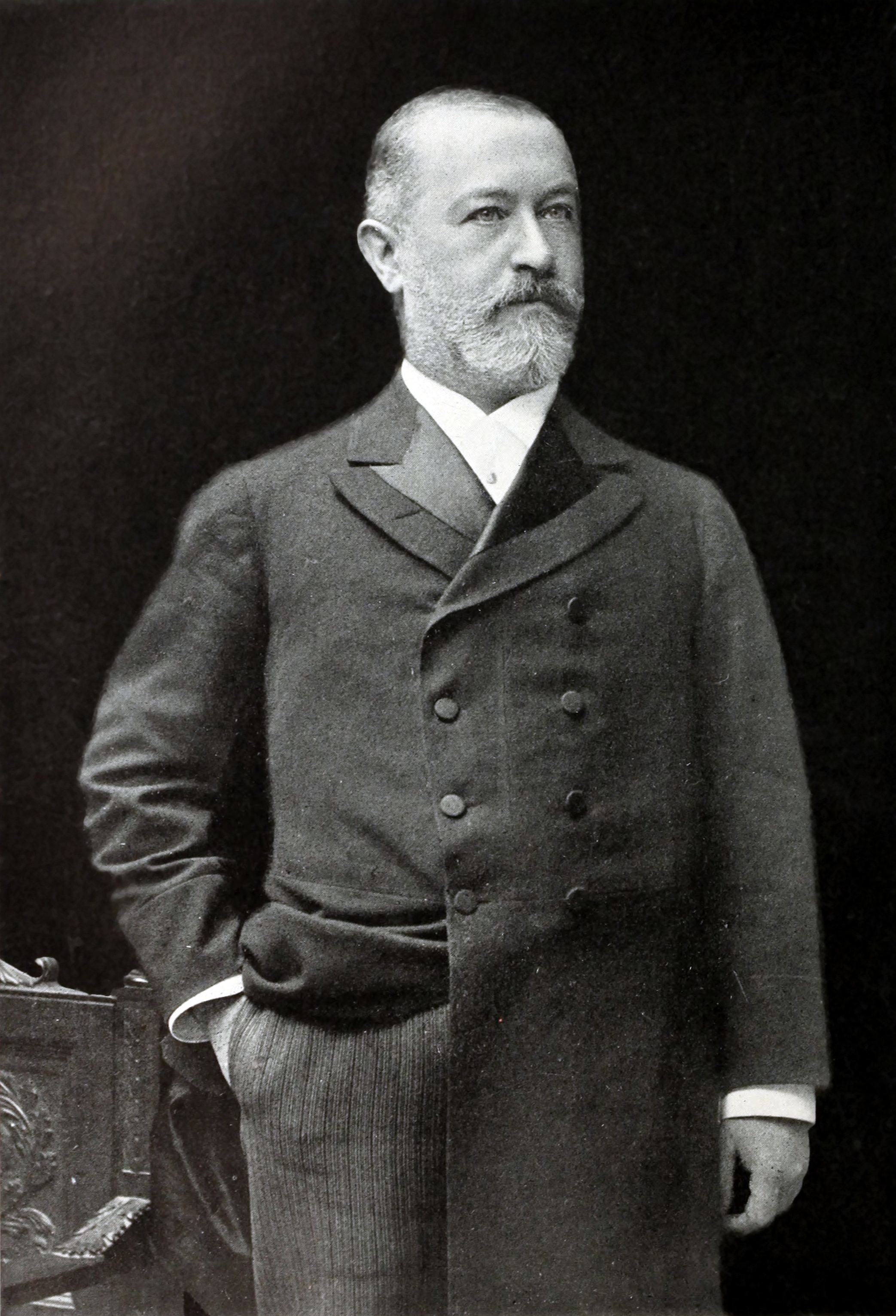
Harriman and Schiff
- A massive fire destroyed 148 city blocks in Jacksonville, Florida, over an area of 455 acres (1.85 square kilometers) and burned 2,361 buildings. At 12:39 p.m., the 36-member city fire department was notified that a fire had broken out at the American Fiber Company at the corner of Davis Street and Union Street. Sparks had ignited a pile of Spanish moss to be used as stuffing, and the fire then spread to the adjacent W. W. Cleveland & Son mattress factory. Destroyed in the blaze were the Duval Country Courthouse, the Jacksonville City Hall, the Windsor Hotel and St. James Hotel, as well as "the city armory, the opera-house, the leading churches of the city, the convent, acres of residences and scores of wholesale and retail business houses." The city would be rebuilt and within two and a half years, thousands of new buildings would be erected; over the next decade, the amount of cargo being handled by the Port of Jacksonville had increased to five times what it had been at the time of the fire.
- An upheaval in the stock market, known as the Panic of 1901 started as E. H. Harriman, who controlled the Union Pacific Railroad, began his attempt to acquire majority ownership of the Northern Pacific Railroad Company (NP), and directed his broker, Jacob Schiff of Kuhn, Loeb & Co. to buy as much as possible.
- Civil government was established in Manila after years of American occupation.
- Born: Hugo Friedhofer, American film score composer, Academy Award winner for the music for The Best Years of Our Lives, in San Francisco (d. 1981)

== May 4, 1901 (Saturday) ==
- The Caste War of Yucatán, the decades-long resistance of the Maya peoples against the Mexican government, ended as General Ignacio Bravo marched his troops into the Mayan capital at Noh Cah Balam (now Chan Santa Cruz) and set up his new headquarters.
- Italy rejected a request from the Ottoman government to help prevent the settlement of foreign Jews in Palestine, at the time a part of Turkish territory.

== May 5, 1901 (Sunday) ==
- Arriving earlier than expected, the royal yacht RMS Ophir reached Australia with the Duke and Duchess of Cornwall on board. The yacht dropped anchor a mile from the shore at Mornington, Victoria at 12:30 p.m., escorted by HMS Juno and followed by a line of other British warships.
- The United States began its withdrawal of forces from Beijing, after a year of occupation that followed the Boxer Rebellion. The troops of the cavalry and artillery of the U.S. 9th Infantry marched out of the Chinese capital toward Tianjin after being dismissed by Major General Adna Chaffee.
- In Lahore (at the time a part of British India, and now in Pakistan) Vishnu Digambar Paluskar established as the first publicly supported school of Indian classical music on the subcontinent, the Gandharva Mahavidyalaya.
- The government of the Ottoman Empire began seizing all overseas correspondence directed to post offices operated by embassies in Constantinople, declaring that any mails had to go through the nation's post office. After protests from the ambassadors, Foreign Minister Tewfik Pasha would relent and apologize to the various diplomats.
- On his 28th birthday, Leon Czolgosz attended a lecture by anarchist Emma Goldman in Cleveland, where she spoke on the subject "Modern Phases of Anarchism". Czolgosz, an unemployed steelworker, would say later that the speech by Goldman (who told her audience that "Anarchism aims at a new and complete freedom ... We merely desire complete liberty and this can never be obtained as long as there is an existing government.") "set me on fire". On September 6, Czolgosz would travel to Buffalo, New York and fatally shoot U.S. President William McKinley.
- Born: Blind Willie McTell (Willie Samuel McTier), influential African-American blues guitarist and singer, in Thomson, Georgia (d. 1959); 24 years after McTell's death, Bob Dylan would record the song Blind Willie McTell
- Died:
  - Dinshaw Maneckji Petit, 77, Indian entrepreneur and textile manufacturer (b. 1823)
  - Axel Wilhelm Eriksson, 64, Swedish settler and trader in South West Africa (b. 1846)
  - Mariano Ignacio Prado, 75, Peruvian state leader, 27th President of Peru (b. 1825)

== May 6, 1901 (Monday) ==
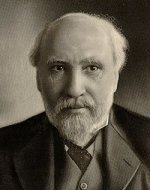
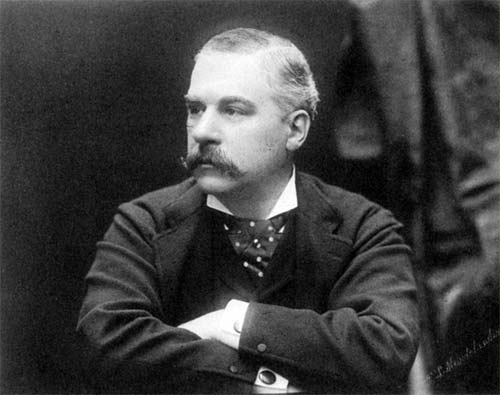
James J. Hill and J. P. Morgan

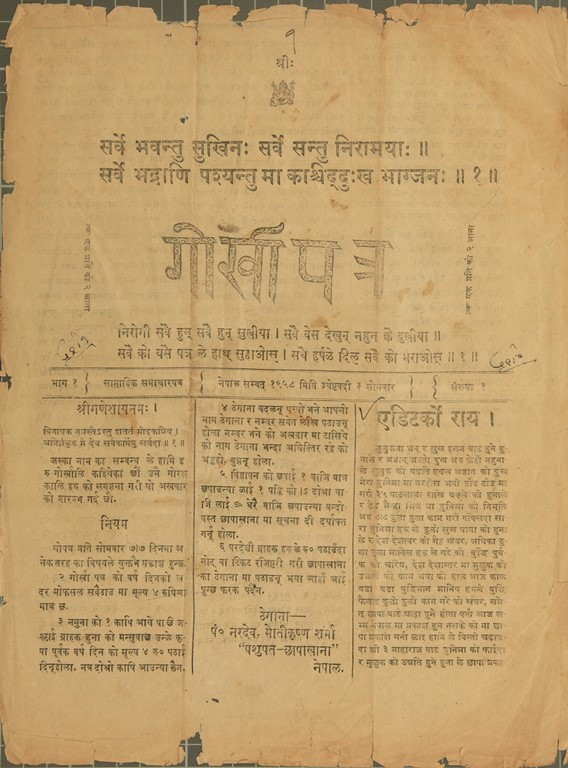
The first issue of Gorkhapatra, still running oldest Nepali newspaper

- The British Ministry of War announced that nearly 15,000 British officers and troops had died in the Second Boer War against South African forces, with 14,264 enlisted men and 714 officers as casualties.
- The House of Commons of the United Kingdom voted 333 to 227 to approve a tax on the sale of coal.
- Gorkhapatra, the oldest still running Nepali newspaper was started on this day. The newspaper was distributed weekly then.

== May 7, 1901 (Tuesday) ==
- Russian painter Ilya Repin began work on his painting Torzhestvennoi Zasedanie Gosudarstvennogo Sovieta 7 Maya 1901 Goda (The Ceremonial Meeting of the State Council, 7 May 1901), commissioned by the Russian State Council to celebrate the 100th anniversary of its first session in 1801. The large work (400 cm x 877 cm, or 13'2" high by 28'9" wide) is housed at the Russian Museum in Saint Petersburg.
- Allis-Chalmers, a manufacturer of agricultural, industrial, mining and construction machinery, was incorporated. Created by a merger of a steam engine and mill equipment producer, the Edward P. Allis Company, and two companies owned by Thomas Chalmers (the Fraser & Chalmers Company and the Gates Iron Works), the new corporation quickly acquired the engine making products of the Dickson Manufacturing Company, and then purchase additional companies; it would sell off most of its lines in 1985.
- German troops routed the Chinese cavalry in a battle at Kalgan (now Zhangjiakou) in the Hebei Province of China.
- Born: Gary Cooper, American film actor, known for leading film roles in Mr. Deeds Goes to Town and The Pride of the Yankees, recipient of the Academy Award for Best Actor for Sergeant York and High Noon, as Frank James Cooper in Helena, Montana (d. 1961)

== May 8, 1901 (Wednesday) ==
- The Australian Labor Party was created, initially with the name "Federal Parliamentary Labor Party", under the leadership of Chris Watson of New South Wales.
- The largest plunge in prices on the New York Stock Exchange took place as panicked investors began selling shares of all stock except for Northern Pacific Railway, which jumped from $143.50 to $200 a share. "Many fortunes that had been made in the last six months by men who never before had a dollar," it was noted the next day, "were in some cases wholly wiped out as a result of the crash, and in others so considerably reduced that little remains."
- The Boston Americans (now the Boston Red Sox) played their first ever home game, a contest at the Huntington Avenue Grounds, a stadium that featured "just a single entrance (and one turnstile)". The home team beat the Philadelphia Athletics (now the Oakland Athletics). Exactly one hundred years later, Boston would win its May 8, 2001, home game by the same margin, defeating the Seattle Mariners, 12–4.

== May 9, 1901 (Thursday) ==
- The Panic of 1901 reached its height on what was described as "Blue Thursday", with the price of Northern Pacific Railway skyrocketing and the prices of other stocks plummeting. In the course of two hours, NP stock rose from $170 a share to $1,000. Banks shipped tens of millions of dollars of cash to New York City because of the demand for money to meet broker accounts. The frenzy would spread over to other markets, as prices fell on the London Stock Exchange As a historian would write later, E. H. Harriman and J. P. Morgan "had contracted for more stock than could be bought or borrowed" and as other brokers began purchasing, the price of a share of Northern Pacific soared from $150 to over $700 by Thursday. As brokers throughout Wall Street were faced with bankruptcy for committing themselves to buying stock that would be worth much less than what they had agreed to pay, Jacob Schiff suggested the truce that ultimately canceled most of the trades and defused the panic.
- The very first Parliament of Australia opened in Melbourne, with the Duke of Cornwall and York (the future King George V) formally declaring the beginning of the session. The initial meeting was held at the Royal Exhibition Building, before temporarily moving to the building that housed the parliament for the State of Victoria while a separate Melbourne site could be constructed for federal business. Melbourne would serve as the capital of Australia until 1927, when the seat of government would move to Canberra.
- The British Brothers' League was chartered in London with the slogan "England for the English", and with the goal of restricting immigration of foreigners into the British Isles. The group would disband after the passage of the Aliens Act in 1905.
- Seven-year old South African Lizzie van Zyl, who had been imprisoned in a British concentration camp in Bloemfontein, died from starvation and typhoid fever. A photo of Lizzie taken before her death would become a symbol of the abuses by British authorities during the Second Boer War, and would be used by activist Emily Hobhouse in bringing attention to the problem.

== May 10, 1901 (Friday) ==
- One day after Kaiser Wilhelm of Germany ordered the recall of Imperial German Navy battleships from China, in an order from Foreign Secretary Oswald von Richthofen to the ambassador in Beijing, Alfons Mumm von Schwarzenstein, Chancellor Bernhard von Bülow attempted to reverse the decision. Noting that "the removal of the armored squadron while the greater part of Your Majesty's expeditionary force is still on Chinese soil" was "highly questionable militarily", von Bülow warned that "as soon as Your Majesty's expeditionary troops lose the armored battleships which are their strongest support, the Russians would cause them difficulties ... I venture to ask Your Majesty, with the deepest respect, to agree to postpone the withdrawal of the fleet at the present moment."
- Jagadish Chandra Bose, physicist and biologist from India, addressed a gathering at the Royal Institution in London and presented experiments to demonstrate his conclusion that plants had reactions similar to feelings, reacting to external stimuli.
- Following the panic of the day before, stocks on Wall Street showed a resurgence and "not a single Stock Exchange house was forced to close its doors or suspend business ... The panic clearly was over."
- Born: J. D. Bernal, Irish physicist and philosopher, in Nenagh, County Tipperary, Ireland (d. 1971)

== May 11, 1901 (Saturday) ==
- Sir Harry Johnston, a biologist and the British Commissioner of Uganda, cabled London to announce that the remains of an animal, long thought to be extinct, were on their way to the British Museum and that the "okapi" continued to exist. Described as "a giraffe-like creature which is closely akin to the ox in size" the okapi was rediscovered by European zoologists in the forests of what is now the Semuliki National Park.
- Professor Charles Peabody, an archaeologist from Harvard University, became the first scholar to discover the variety of music that would become known as "Delta blues". Although he had arrived in Coahoma County, Mississippi, to oversee the excavation of a Choctaw Indian burial mound, his more important finding was the folk songs that the African-American work crew was singing while doing the excavation "and the mesmerizing power of their music continued to haunt Peabody's imagination long after he returned to Cambridge". He would publish his observations under the title "Notes on Negro Music" in the Journal of American Folklore, popularizing the genre.
- Born: Rose Ausländer, German poet (d. 1988)

== May 12, 1901 (Sunday) ==
- Speed limits went into effect in the United States for the first time as a law took effect in Connecticut, setting 12 miles per hour (19 km/h) as the maximum motor vehicle speed within cities, and 15 miles per hour (24 km/h) on roads in the rest of the state.
- Born:
  - "The Duke of Paducah" (stage name of Benjamin Francis Ford), American comedian, country singer and radio host, in De Soto, Missouri (d. 1986)
  - Christopher Hinton, British nuclear engineer, in Tisbury, England (d. 1983)

== May 13, 1901 (Monday) ==
- In the British House of Commons, Winston Churchill defied his fellow Conservative Party members of parliament by speaking out against a proposal to increase the size and the budget of the British Army. "Has the wealth of the country doubled? Has the population doubled? Have the armies of Europe doubled? Is there no poverty at home? Has the English Channel dried up and we are no longer an island?" In the decades that followed, the words of the young politician, 26 years old at the time and in his first year in Commons, would frequently be re-quoted. Noting the effect that changing technology had on the nature of war, Churchill observed, "In former years, when wars arose from individual causes... when they were fought by small regular armies of professional soldiers, and when their course was retarded by the difficulties of communication and supply, and often suspended by the winter season, it was possible to limit the liabilities of the combatants. But now, when mighty populations are impelled on each other, each individual severally embittered and inflamed, when the resources of science and civilisation sweep away everything that might mitigate their fury, a European war can only end in the ruin of the vanquished and the scarcely less fatal commercial dislocation and exhaustion of the conquerors." Noting that "Democracy is more vindictive than Cabinets", Churchill prophesied that "The wars of peoples will be more terrible than those of kings." The Parliament would favor the increased military expenditure anyway, in what one historian would later describe as "the jettisoning of Pax Britannica by Britain herself"
- Born: Witold Pilecki, Polish resistance leader (d. 1948)

== May 14, 1901 (Tuesday) ==
- Fifteen months after his arrest for agitation against the Russian Empire, Polish nationalist and future President of Poland Józef Piłsudski was able to escape to freedom with the assistance of two fellow Poles, Dr. Władysław Mazurkiewicz and Aleksander Sulkiewicz. Russian authorities had incarcerated Piłsudski at the Warsaw Citadel on February 22, 1900, but over the next ten months, he successfully faked symptoms of mental illness and was diagnosed with "psychosis hallucinatoria". He was transferred to the Nikolaevskii Hospital in Saint Petersburg on December 15, 1900, where Dr. Mazurkiewicz assisted his departure while most of the staff was absent.
- Mexico became an oil-producing nation with the first strike in the El Ebano oil field, in a joint venture by Edward L. Doheny and geologist Ezequiel Ordóñez of the Mexican Central Railway. At a depth of 525 feet (160 m), the drilling rig encountered a gusher of petroleum that produced 50 barrels per day, but the railway declined to purchase the output. By 1910, the wells at El Ebano would be outproducing wells in the United States.
- The transformation of desert land in Southern California into the Imperial Valley began as water was diverted from the Colorado River into the Alamo River. The waters would reach California farmland on June 21.
- Thomas Armat was granted a patent for the Vitascope, the first practical cinema film projector, receiving U.S. Patent Number 673,922.
- Born:
  - Robert Ritter, German eugenicist, racial scientist for Nazi Germany (d. 1951)
  - Edward Weinfeld, American jurist, in Manhattan, New York City (d. 1988)
- Died: George Augustus Conquest, 64, British playwright and actor (b. 1837)

== May 15, 1901 (Wednesday) ==
- Philippine General Tomás Mascardo and his command of 17 officers and 215 soldiers surrendered unconditionally to American forces on the island of Luzon, after negotiating with U.S. Army Captain Joseph P. O'Neil.
- The town of Cleo Springs, Oklahoma, was incorporated by a vote of 65 to 6 by its residents.
- Born:
  - Dorothy Hansine Andersen, American physician and pathologist, first to identify the respiratory disease of cystic fibrosis in 1935; ironically, she would die from lung cancer (d. 1963)
  - Xavier Herbert, Australian writer, in Geraldton, Australia (d. 1984)
  - Luis Monti, Argentine football player, only person to compete in the World Cup for two different teams, appearing for Argentina in 1930, and for Italy in 1934; in both tournaments, he appeared in the final game (d. 1983)
  - Abram N. Spanel, Russian-American entrepreneur, philanthropist and founder of the International Latex Corporation, later known as Playtex, in Odessa (d. 1985)

== May 16, 1901 (Thursday) ==
- The British House of Commons voted 305–163 to approve the reorganization of the British Army as proposed by Secretary of State for War John Brodrick.
- In Edinburgh, Scotland, psychologist William James began the series of Gifford Lectures that would become his classic study The Varieties of Religious Experience.
- The first international football match outside of the United Kingdom was held in South America as Uruguay lost against Argentina, 3–2, in Montevideo.

== May 17, 1901 (Friday) ==
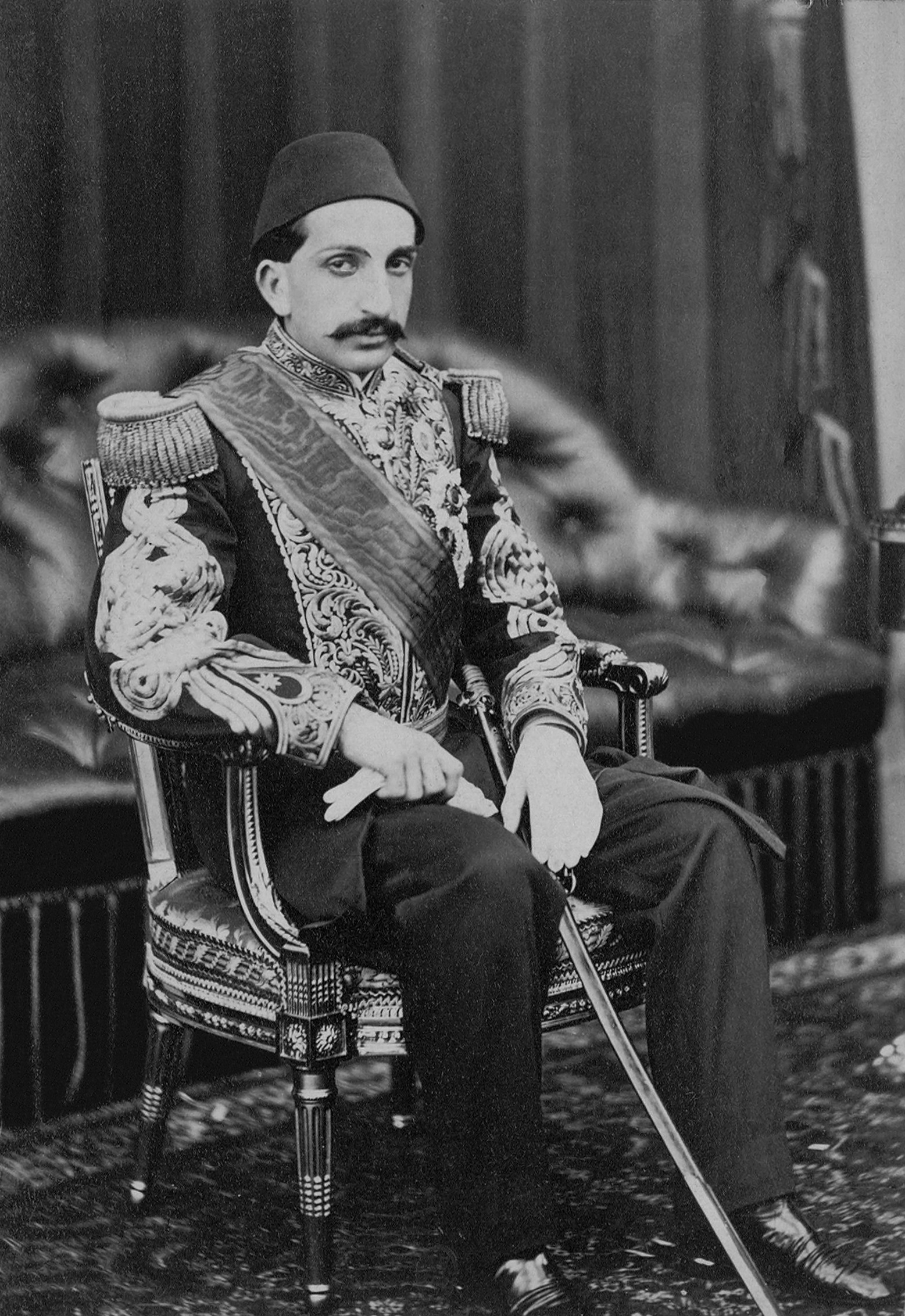
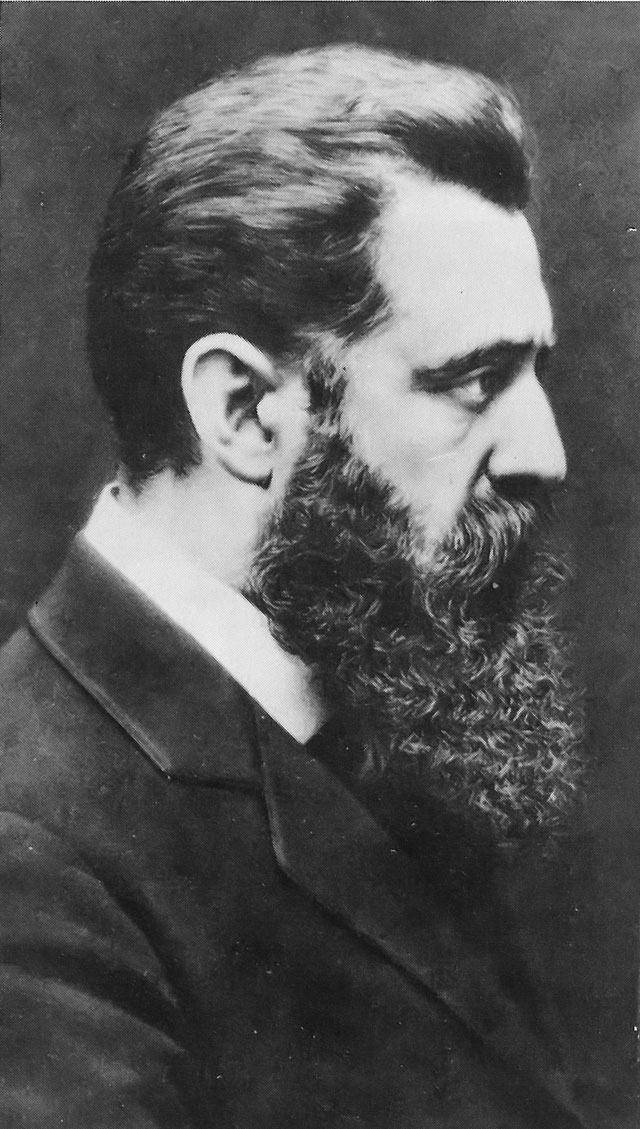
Caliph Abdul Hamid II in 1867 (top) and Zionist leader Theodor Herzl in 1904 (bottom)
- Theodor Herzl, the founder and President of the Zionist Organization, was granted an audience by Sultan Hamid of the Ottoman Empire, in a two-hour meeting at Constantinople. The Sultan acknowledged that "his Empire was wide open to Jewish refugees and, among the non-Muslims, they were his most reliable subjects." Herzl presented his proposal for the Sultan to grant an Imperial Charter to allow the colonization of Palestine for a Jewish state, in return for Jewish financiers assuming the responsibility to pay off of the Empire's debts. As Herzl would recount later, he told the Sultan, "His Majesty is the lion, perhaps I am Androcles, and maybe there is a thorn that has to be pulled out." Although the Sultan was intrigued by Herzl's idea, which would have led to the creation of the State of Israel 47 years earlier than its May 17, 1948, founding, the Charter was not granted.
- Former National League baseball star Nap Lajoie was given the go-ahead to play in the rival American League after a court in Philadelphia denied a request for an injunction based on a reserve clause in the older league's contract. Lajoie had played for the NL's Philadelphia Phillies for four seasons, but after the 1900 season, he signed a contract for more money with the AL's Philadelphia Athletics. The day after the decision, Lajoie began playing in the American League and became the new circuit's first superstar.
- Major General Chaffee issued his farewell order to the U.S. 9th Infantry Regiment, bringing an end to the American military presence in China. Evacuation would be completed from Beijing by May 23.
- Born: Werner Egk, German composer (d. 1983)

== May 18, 1901 (Saturday) (Sunday) ==
- The first and only recorded observation of an "eclipse rainbow" was seen by observers on the island of Mauritius, where astronomers had traveled to watch the first long duration solar eclipse of the new century. At the height of the solar eclipse, British astronomer E. W. Maunder reported a rainbow, formed by light from the Sun's corona, was visible. Maunder would write later that the rainbow "tapered at the two ends" and had "bright lines running through it, particularly a bright pink line" that he surmised to be indicative of the hydrogen in a solar prominence. With a totality of 6 minutes, 29 seconds, it would be one of only seven in the 20th century to last more than six minutes.
- President William McKinley toured San Francisco and watched the launching of the new U.S. Navy battleship, the USS Ohio.
- Maltbie Davenport Babcock, 42, American Presbyterian clergyman and hymnwriter, best known for authoring "This Is My Father's World", died in an apparent suicide. While hospitalized in Italy after a visit to the Middle East, Babcock slit his wrist and swallowed "corrosive sublimate", a mercuric chloride powder.
- Born:
  - Vincent du Vigneaud, American chemist, 1955 Nobel Prize laureate, in Chicago (d. 1978)
  - Julius Adams Stratton, American electrical engineer, author of the textbook Electromagnetic Engineering, President of the Massachusetts Institute of Technology from 1964 to 1971 (d. 1994)

== May 19, 1901 (Sunday) ==
- U.S. Army Brigadier General Loyd Wheaton formally proclaimed a termination of the state of war in the Philippines.
- Meeting in Paris, the International Olympic Committee unanimously voted to award the 1904 Summer Olympics to Chicago. On February 10, 1903, however, the games would be transferred to St. Louis, which had postponed its scheduled World's Fair to 1904.
- Elections were held in Spain for the 402-member Congress of Deputies, and the government of Prime Minister Práxedes Mateo Sagasta continued in office.
- Born: Dorothy Buffum Chandler, American newspaper publisher, in La Fayette, Illinois (d. 1997)
- Died: Marthinus Wessel Pretorius, 81, South African state leader, first State President of the South African Republic (b. 1819)

== May 20, 1901 (Monday) ==
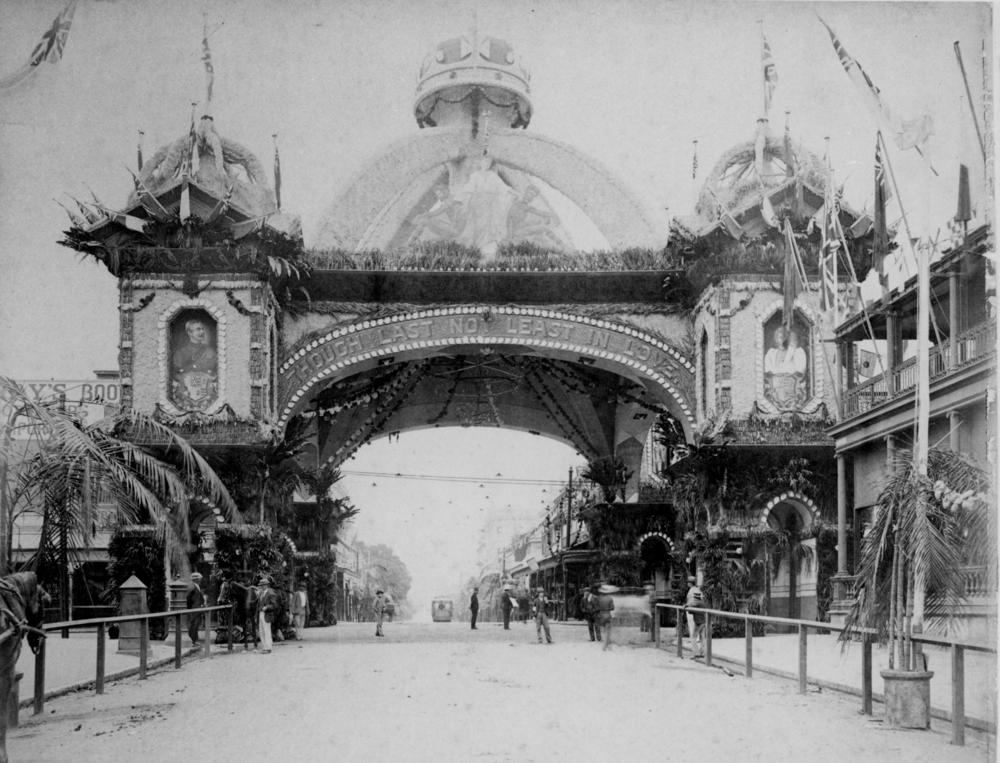
Decorated arch erected over George Street, Brisbane, for the royal visit of the future King George V to Australia.

- The Duke of Cornwall and York, son of King Edward VII and the heir to the British throne, arrived in Brisbane during his tour of Australia.
- At Alexandrovsky, near Saint Petersburg, Russian police fought with a group of 3,500 protesters at the Obuchoff Iron Works. After 12 of the police were injured, Russian soldiers fired into the crowd, killing 40 people and wounding 150 others.
- U.S. Vice-President Theodore Roosevelt declared the formal opening of the Pan-American Exposition in Buffalo, New York. Roosevelt noted that "The century upon which we have just entered must inevitably be one of tremendous triumph or of tremendous failure for the whole human race, because, to an infinitely greater extent than ever before, humanity is knit together in all its parts for weal or for woe."
- Born:
  - Max Euwe, Dutch chess player (d. 1981)
  - Doris Fleeson, American journalist (d. 1970)
- Died: Johannes Minckwitz, 58, German chess player, from injuries sustained after he stepped into the path of an oncoming train near Biebrich, Germany (b. 1843)

== May 21, 1901 (Tuesday) ==
- King Victor Emmanuel narrowly missed death in an elevator accident and would reign for another 45 years before his forced abdication in May 1946. Into his tenth month as King of Italy after succeeding his assassinated father, Victor Emmanuel had returned to his palace from a walk in Rome and entered the elevator cab to be taken to his apartments on the second story, but "an inexperienced servant set the indicator for the third story." There being no safety gates or doors on the cab, passengers simply stepped out when the elevator reached their destination. "Arriving at the second story, the King was on the point of stepping out as the elevator continued to ascend," a worldwide report noted the next day, "but he jumped back in the nick of time, and thus escaped being crushed."
- The Beaver Line steamship SS Lake Champlain became the first ocean going vessel to be equipped with the new technology of wireless radio, as a telegraph transmitter was installed on the ship while it was in port in Liverpool.
- In Montgomery, Alabama, the convention to disenfranchise African-American voters by revising the Constitution of Alabama opened, with 155 delegates, most of whom were members of the state Democratic Party, which had adopted the slogan "White Supremacy and Pure Elections".
- Born:
  - Regina M. Anderson, African-American playwright (d. 1993)
  - Manfred Aschner, German-Israeli microbiologist and entomologist, recipient of the Israel Prize (d. 1989)
  - Horace Heidt, American bandleader (d. 1986)
  - Sam Jaffe, American film producer (d. 2000)
  - Suzanne Lilar, Belgian essayist, novelist, and playwright, in Ghent (d. 1992)
  - Margaret Little, British psychoanalyst, developer of object relations theory (d. 1994)
- Died:
  - Sir John Edmund Commerell, 72, former British Admiral of the Fleet (b. 1829)
  - Fitz John Porter, 78, American army officer, brigadier general for the Union Army who was court-martialed after the Second Battle of Bull Run for insubordination (b. 1822)

== May 22, 1901 (Wednesday) ==
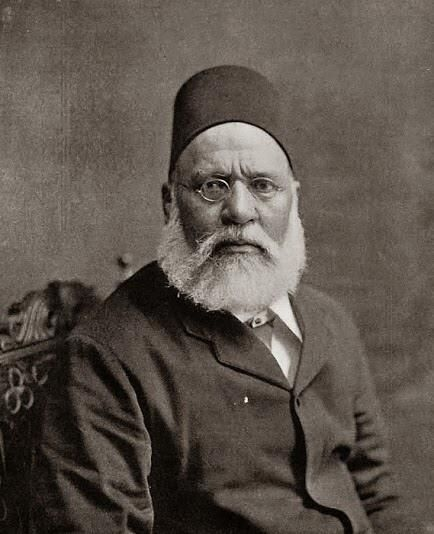
Ahmed ʻUrabi

- Ahmed ʻUrabi Pasha, who led the Egyptian rebellion against the British in 1882 and had been banished to British Ceylon, was pardoned by the British government.
- Five hundred Boer prisoners of war arrived in India, to be relocated to a POW camp in Ahmednagar.
- Queen Yaa Asantewaa, who had led the Ashanti War against the British colonial government in Ghana in 1900 was sent into exile along with 15 other rebel leaders and their dependents, and would live for the rest of her life on the other side of Africa, on the Seychelles Islands.
- Sir Thomas Lipton and his seven guests, including King Edward of the United Kingdom, were sailing in Lipton's yacht, Shamrock II, in the strait of The Solent off the coast of the Isle of Wight, when a storm suddenly struck. The spars, masts and sails of the yacht were destroyed, effectively preventing the management of the sails, but Lipton was able to bring the monarch back to safety.
- Vice-President Theodore Roosevelt was the victim of an elaborate practical joke staged by the organizers of the Pan-American Exposition. The future President was asked to lead dignitaries to visit an old log cabin behind the fairgrounds, and "as he stooped to enter the cabin door there was a terrific warwhoop and two Indians in full war paint and feathers leaped up from the darkness and seized Colonel Roosevelt. Instantly there was a tremendous tumult of warwhoops and the report of many guns," the press noted the next day. The two "attackers" were well-known Oglala Sioux leaders, American Horse and Jack Red Cloud. When Roosevelt realized that it was a prank, he laughed and said, "By Jove, this is a rum on me."
- Born: Clarissa Scott Delany, African-American poet and educator (d. 1927)
- Died: Gaetano Bresci, 31, the anarchist who assassinated King Umberto of Italy, hanged himself in his cell at the San Stefano Prison. After his arrest at the assassination scene on July 29, 1900, Bresci was sentenced to life imprisonment, the highest penalty in Italy. According to an American commentator, however, his suicide "was the result of a series of tortures inflicted by order of the government, with the intention of driving him to end his life" and that "From the hour of his conviction those in charge of the prisoner sought by every method known to make him inflict the extreme penalty for his crime."

== May 23, 1901 (Thursday) ==
- The Keloet volcano on the island of Java erupted, killing hundreds of people.
- France announced "the opening of the French Soudan" (now Mali in northwest Africa rather than Sudan in northeast Africa) "to European traffic" after a successful navigation of the Niger River by Captain Eugène Lenfant. The French captain led a mission of taking flat-bottomed boats with 60 tons of provisions to French troops at Gaya, Niger.
- In another one of the great comebacks of baseball history, the Cleveland Blues (known at the time as the "Blues") defeated the Washington Senators despite being down 13–5 with two men out near the end of the final inning. After Bill Hoffer and Ollie Pickering were struck out by Washington pitcher Casey Patten, Jack McCarthy came up to bat, and hit a single that began a rally that saw nine consecutive runs scored.
- For the first time in any major league baseball game, a player was intentionally walked despite the bases being loaded. Nap Lajoie of the Philadelphia Athletics, the biggest star of the new American League was in Chicago for a game against the Chicago White Stockings. Going into the ninth inning, Chicago had an 11–5 lead, but there were no outs and men on first, second and third base when Lajoie came up to bat against pitcher Zaza Harvey, so, Clark Griffith, the team manager and one of the pitchers, substituted himself for Harvey. Reasoning that Lajoie could bring in four scores with a home run, Griffith decided instead to throw four bad pitches so that only one run would score from Lajoie's time at bat, and Philadelphia's Phil Geier advanced from third base to home. Three of the next four batters were forced out, and Chicago won, 11–9. Intentional walks with the bases loaded would happen only two more times in the 115 seasons that followed, happening on July 23, 1944 (in the New York Giants' 12–10 win over the Chicago Cubs), and on May 28, 1998, (in Arizona's 8–7 defeat of San Francisco).
- The first Canadian Patriotic Fund Association, intended for relief of Canadian veterans and the families of Canadians killed in the Second Boer War, was incorporated.
- Born:
  - Charles W. Morris, American philosopher and pioneer in the field of semiotics, in Denver (d. 1979)
  - Edmund Rubbra, English classical composer, in Northampton, England (d. 1986)
- Died: Charles Boysset, 84, the oldest member of France's Chamber of Deputies, after 52 years in office.

== May 24, 1901 (Friday) ==
- A mine accident killed 81 coal miners at the Universal Colliery at Senghenydd in South Wales.
- Officials at the Royal Academy of Music in London announced that The Fairy-Queen had been rediscovered after being considered lost for almost 200 years. The full score for the opera, composed by English composer Henry Purcell, not seen since the early 18th century, had been in a box of manuscripts that had been bequeathed to the academy library in 1887 by R. J. S. Stevens.
- Social activist Emily Hobhouse returned from her tour of South Africa and brought back the news that the British Army was keeping South African civilians in concentration camps.
- A sidewheel excursion boat with 600 people on board, the steamer Empire State, caught fire and began leaking after it was caught in a storm 12 miles (19 km) from shore on the St. Lawrence River. The captain and crew were able to bring the ship to Ogdensburg, New York, as it was gradually going down, "and the vessel just made shore when it sank in eight feet of water". There were no injuries.
  - The sinking of the U.S. steamship City of Baltimore in Lake Huron killed 13 of the 15 people on board, off the coast of East Tawas, Michigan, after it was destroyed by a storm. Destroyed also was the schooner C. H. Hackley, which sank in Lake Michigan with seven people on board while attempting to travel from Milwaukee to Sheboygan, Wisconsin.
- Born::
  - Arvid Harnack, German lawyer, economist and leader of resistance against Adolf Hitler, in Darmstadt, Germany (d. 1942, executed)
  - Hermann Priess, German army officer, convicted of the Malmedy massacre during World War II, in Marnitz, Germany (d. 1985)
- Died::
  - Louis-Zéphirin Moreau, 77, French Canadian bishop beatified in 1987 (b. 1824)
  - Charlotte Mary Yonge, 77, English novelist (b. 1823)

== May 25, 1901 (Saturday) ==
- Norway granted the right to vote to women, limited to those who were taxpayers.
- A fire in a mine in Germany killed 31 miners.
- The British weekly magazine Tit-Bits announced that Arthur Conan Doyle was going to resume writing the adventures of his fictional detective, Sherlock Holmes, nearly eight years after the character had been killed off in the story "The Final Problem". The first installment of The Hound of the Baskervilles would appear in August in The Strand Magazine.
- Boer troops attacked a British convoy under the command of General Herbert Plumer and destroyed half of it.
- The last remaining cable car in New York City, operating on Broadway Street between Bowling Green Park and 59th Street, made its final run. By the 20th century, the cars had been superseded by electric trolleys. At 8:30 p.m., the cable line that pulled the car was dismantled, to make way for the installation of electric lines.
- Representatives from 27 different labor organizations gathered in Buenos Aires and formed the Federación Obrera Regional Argentina (FORA, the Argentine Regional Workers' Federation).
- The Club Atlético River Plate, named for the Río de la Plata which serves Buenos Aires, was founded in Argentina. Its professional football team, generally referred to as "River Plate", would become the most successful in Argentina's national league, and would win the titles in 28 of its first 100 years, as well as being honored by FIFA as one of the ten best teams of the 20th century.
- Both of South Carolina's U.S. Senators, Benjamin Tillman and John L. McLaurin, resigned following a joint debate, and asked that they be re-elected by the South Carolina Senate.
- The Creek Indians national council voted to ratify an allotment agreement with the United States that provided that the Creek tribal government would be dissolved effective March 4, 1906, and that the land (located in eastern Oklahoma) would be made available to be resold to private buyers.
- Born: Antônio Castilho de Alcântara Machado, Brazilian novelist (d. 1935)

== May 26, 1901 (Sunday) ==
- The government of Imperial China announced that it had reached an agreement with the members of the Eight-Nation Alliance (the six European superpowers, along with Japan and the United States) on the indemnity to be paid by China for damages arising from the Boxer Rebellion of 1900. Economists at the time estimated that it would take China 39 years to pay the reparations amount of 450 million taels (£67,500,000 or $175,500,000) along with four percent annual interest, and that China would have to raise 23,000,000 taels in tax revenues each year in order to avoid default.

== May 27, 1901 (Monday) ==
- The United States Supreme Court decided the first of the "Insular Cases" that arose from questions over the status of the first overseas territories captured by the U.S. in a war against a foreign power. DeLima v. Bidwell and Downes v. Bidwell were both lawsuits over the status of Puerto Rico (referred to at the time as "Porto Rico"), ceded to the United States by Spain following the Spanish–American War, but the decision would apply to all territories, including the Philippines. The cases arose when the State of New York continued to collect a tariffs and duties on a "foreign import" after the cession; as Justice Brown described it in the 5–4 majority opinion in DeLima, the question was "whether Porto Rico was a 'foreign country' at the time the sugars were shipped", and more specifically, "whether a country which had been ceded to us, the cession accepted, possession delivered and the island occupied and administered without interference by Spain or any other power, was a foreign country or domestic territory". The Court concluded "that... Porto Rico was not a foreign country within the meaning of the tariff laws, but a territory of the United States, that the duties were illegally exacted, and that the plaintiffs are entitled to recover them back." In the Downes case, however, the Court concluded that although Puerto Rico was not a foreign nation, it "is a territory appurtenant and belonging to the United States, but not a part of the United States within the revenue clauses of the Constitution... and that the plaintiff cannot recover back the duties exacted in this case." The Court also ruled that "the guarantee against deprivation of life, liberty and property without due process of law is fundamental and hence applicable in all the possessions of the United States", but added that "in the case of Porto Rico and the Philippines... there is an implied denial of the right of the inhabitants to American citizenship until Congress by further action shall signify its assent thereto."
- In New Jersey, the Edison Storage Battery Company was founded.
- Twenty-one coal miners in the Richland Mining Company's underground excavation near Dayton, Tennessee, were killed by two simultaneous explosions that resulted from poor placement of black powder charges. Because the person doing the coal firing used too much of the powder, the explosion "blew outward in a long flame" which "ignited coal dust particles suspended in a mine atmosphere, resulting in an instantaneous flash fire through the entire length of the mine", then caused massive sections of the roof to collapse.
- Boer troops captured the British outpost of the Midland Mounted Rifles, taking 41 British troops prisoner on their way to Maraisburg, South Africa.
- Died: Artur Hazelius, 77, Swedish scholar and creator of the Nordic Museum (b. 1833)

== May 28, 1901 (Tuesday) ==
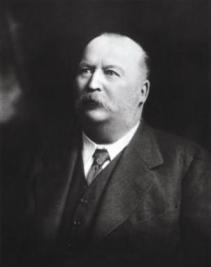
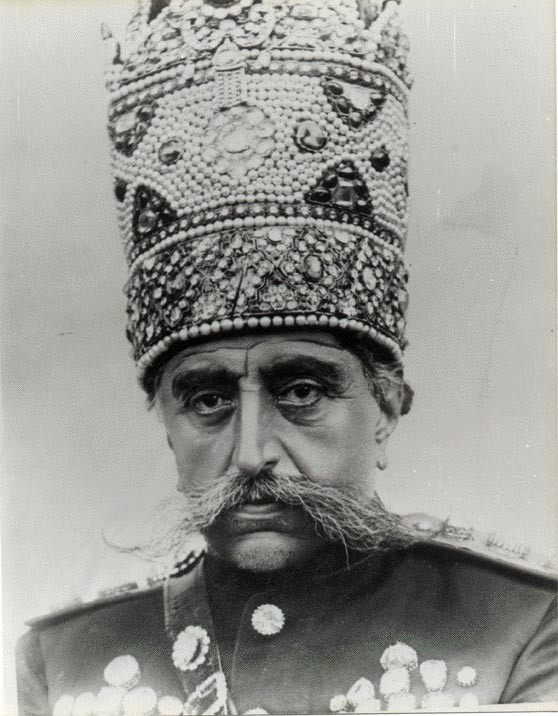
Oilman D'Arcy and Shah of Iran
- The Anglo-Persian Oil Company, represented by Alfred L. Marriott on behalf of William Knox D'Arcy, signed an agreement with the Shah of Iran, Mozaffar ad-Din Shah Qajar, with APOC receiving exclusive rights to drill for oil within almost all of Iran except for the five northern provinces bordering Russia, a 480,000 square mile area. The lease, binding for the next sixty years, was made in exchange for 40,000 British pounds and a royalty to Iran of 16% of the profits.
- Kaiser Wilhelm ordered that the number of German troops in China be reduced, and summoned the commanding general, Count Alfred von Waldersee, back to Berlin.
- Fighting in British Somaliland against the "Mad Mullah", British forces cut off his base of supplies and captured 5,000 head of cattle used to supply the Mullah's forces.
- The Cuban Constitutional Convention voted 15–14 to accept the terms of the Platt Amendment passed by the United States Congress, allowing the United States to exercise protectorate control over Cuba, but with fewer amendments. Even then, however, President William McKinley refused to accept the Cuban resolution because it still contained qualifiers, so a third vote would be held on June 12.

== May 29, 1901 (Wednesday) ==
- Fifty-one British Army soldiers and six officers of the Seventh Battalion of Imperial Yeomanry were killed, and another 122 wounded, near the South African town of Vlakfontein, in an attack on Brigadier General Henry Dixon's brigade by Boer General Jan Kemp. Kemp's cavalry of 500 burghers had charged the British column, using a new technique where the soldiers fired their rifles from horseback.
- The opera Manru, written by Polish Ignacy Jan Paderewski, was performed for the first time, with the premiere at the Royal Opera in Dresden.
- The world's foremost automobile race, the James Gordon Bennett Cup, was won by Henri Fournier, who completed the 345-mile (555 km) distance from Paris to Bourdeaux in less than nine hours, crossing the finish line in a time of 8:44:44. Fournier had been a distant third until the two race leaders, Fernand Charron and Alfred Levegh (pseudonym for Alfred Velghe), collided at Orléans and were forced to withdraw.

== May 30, 1901 (Thursday) ==
- The first "hall of fame", the Hall of Fame for Great Americans, was formally opened, on The Bronx campus of New York University.
- President William McKinley returned to Washington, D.C. after a month-long tour of the United States.
- King Victor Emmanuel of Italy oversaw the launching of the most powerful vessel in the Italian Navy fleet, the battleship Regina Margherita.
- Much Ado About Nothing, an opera composed by Charles Villiers Stanford and based on the play of the same name by William Shakespeare, was performed for the first time, premiering at the Royal Opera House in London.
- Harry S. Truman completed his formal education, graduating from Independence High School in Independence, Missouri, at the age of 17. Truman would be rejected by the United States Military Academy at West Point because of his poor eyesight, and would go on to be the last President of the United States to never have gone to college.
- Born: Frankie Trumbauer, American jazz saxophonist, in Carbondale, Illinois (d. 1956)

== May 31, 1901 (Friday) ==
- Bulgaria amended its election law to disenfranchise the Muslim members of the Romani (or "gypsy") minority, and people classified as nomads, despite constitutional guarantees of equal voting rights.
- Detective Edward Henry began work at London's Scotland Yard as the new Assistant Commissioner, and began the process of implementing his Henry Classification System of fingerprints to create the first Central Fingerprint Branch by July.
- Bechstein Hall (now Wigmore Hall), the leading international venue for performances of chamber music because of its acoustics, held its first concert, with Ferruccio Busoni on the piano and Eugène Ysaÿe on the violin inaugurating the London facility.
- A Baptist minister from Pittsburg, Texas, Burrell Cannon, was granted U.S. Patent No. 62,509 for the key component to what he called the Ezekiel Airship. Cannon proposed four of the wheels as propellers for a heavier-than-air flying machine, and sold $20,000 worth of stock in the Ezekiel Airship Manufacturing Company to potential investors. "If it is true that he actually flew the craft," an author would note later, "then he beat the Wright Brothers by more than two years." However, the airship itself would never be patented, nor do any blueprints survive, and the model would be accidentally destroyed while it was being shipped in a railroad car. On June 23, newspapers in the United States carried a drawing of the airship and announced that "The first product of the Ezekiel Airship company will take its trial spin July 1".
- Five people were lynched by a mob in Lookout, California, after being arrested for petty theft. At 2:00 in the morning, Calvin Hall was visiting the local hotel where his three sons, Frank, James and Martin, were being held in custody along with a friend, B. D. Yantis, when "a mob of fifty persons" overpowered the two constables guarding the group, then took the Hall family and Yantis to a bridge over the Pit River. Frank was put to death even before the group reached the main bridge, and the mob hanged the other four shortly afterward.
- Born: Alfredo Antonini, Italian-born American conductor and composer, in Milan (d. 1983)
