= 1901 Cleveland Blues season =

1901 Cleveland Blues
- League: American League
- Ballpark: League Park
- City: Cleveland, Ohio
- Record: 54–82 (.397)
- League place: 7th
- Owners: Charles Somers
- Managers: Jimmy McAleer

The 1901 Cleveland Blues season was a season in American baseball. It was the franchise's first in the majors, being one of the original franchises of the American League. Called the "Blues" or "Bluebirds", the team finished seventh out of eight teams.

== Before the 1901 season ==
=== 1899: Major League Baseball leaves Cleveland ===
Ban Johnson, founder of the American League

The Cleveland Spiders were dissolved after winning only 20 games and losing 134 in the 1899 season along with the Louisville Colonels, Baltimore Orioles, and the Washington Senators, leaving the National League with eight teams to begin the 1900 season. As a result, 1900 marked the first year since 1886 during which the city of Cleveland did not have a team affiliated with Major League Baseball.

=== 1900: A new franchise ===
Ban Johnson, president of the Western League, changed the league's name to the American League in 1900, bringing aboard a new team in Cleveland, then known as the Cleveland Lake Shores, along with new Baltimore and Washington franchises, which would be created with or without the approval of the National League. During this time, Cleveland had a minor league baseball team, known as the Bluebirds or Blues due to their all-blue uniforms, which finished their season with a 63–73 record and finished sixth.

=== 1901: Major league once more ===
The American League became a major league before the 1901 season. As the American League made the jump to major league status, many players jumped ship, including Cy Young and Nap Lajoie, which led the National League to call them an "outlaw league" in November 1900. As the 1901 season came underway in April, and as the war between the two leagues erupted, the Cleveland franchise, now known as the Blues, began its first official season as a Major League Baseball team.

== Regular season ==
=== Season summary ===
==== April ====
Bill Hallman, a second baseman, played five games at shortstop for the Blues in 1901

The Cleveland Blues played their first game of the season against the Chicago White Stockings on April 24, 1901. This was the first games in the history of the American League; three other games scheduled that day were rained out. The starting lineup consisted of: Ollie Pickering (RF), Jack McCarthy (LF), Frank Genins (CF), Candy LaChance (1B), Bill Bradley (3B), Erve Beck (2B), Bill Hallman (SS), Bob Wood (C), and Bill Hoffer (P). Hoffer allowed seven runs in the first two innings and the Blues failed to recover, as they lost the game 8–2, earning the first loss in American League history. In the second game of the season, Beck hit the first home run in American League history off pitcher John Skopec, but the Blues lost again, 7–3.

==== May ====
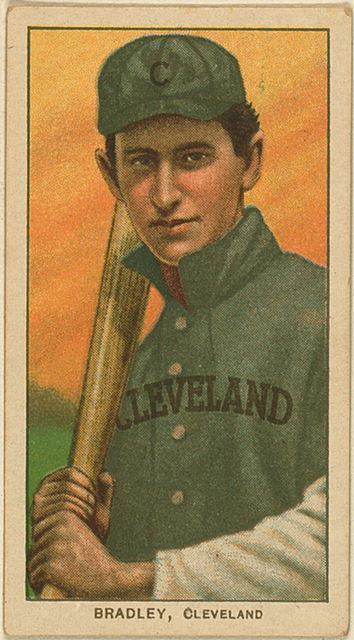
Blues' starting third baseman Bill Bradley

On May 9, 1901, Earl Moore threw the first no-hitter in the history of the franchise and the American League. The Blues lost to Chicago by a score of 4–2 despite allowing no hits.

On May 23, Cleveland scored nine runs with the bases empty and two outs in the bottom of the ninth inning to beat Washington 14–13.

=== Season standings ===
American League
Team	W	L	Pct.	GB	Home	Road
Chicago White Stockings	83	53	.610	—	49‍–‍21	34‍–‍32
Boston Americans	79	57	.581	4	49‍–‍20	30‍–‍37
Detroit Tigers	74	61	.548	8½	42‍–‍27	32‍–‍34
Philadelphia Athletics	74	62	.544	9	42‍–‍24	32‍–‍38
Baltimore Orioles	68	65	.511	13½	40‍–‍25	28‍–‍40
Washington Senators	61	72	.459	20½	31‍–‍35	30‍–‍37
Cleveland Blues	54	82	.397	29	28‍–‍39	26‍–‍43
Milwaukee Brewers	48	89	.350	35½	32‍–‍37	16‍–‍52

=== Record vs. opponents ===
1901 American League record Sources:
Team	BAL	BOS	CWS	CLE	DET	MIL	PHA	WSH
Baltimore	—	9–9	4–14–1	11–9	9–10	12–7–1	12–8	11–8
Boston	9–9	—	12–8	12–6	9–11–1	15–5	10–10	12–8–1
Chicago	14–4–1	8–12	—	13–7	10–10	16–4	12–8	10–8
Cleveland	9–11	6–12	7–13	—	6–14	11–9	6–14	9–9–2
Detroit	10–9	11–9–1	10–10	14–6	—	13–7	7–9	9–11
Milwaukee	7–12–1	5–15	4–16	9–11	7–13	—	6–14	10–8–1
Philadelphia	8–12	10–10	8–12	14–6	9–7	14–6	—	11–9–1
Washington	8–11	8–12–1	8–10	9–9–2	11–9	8–10–1	9–11–1	—

== Roster ==
1901 Cleveland Blues
Roster
Pitchers: Bock Baker; Jack Bracken; Dick Braggins; Bill Cristall; Pete Dowling; Bill Hart; Bill Hoffer; Harry McNeal; Earl Moore; Ed Scott; Gus Weyhing	Catchers: Joe Connor; Paddy Livingston; Bob Wood; George Yeager; Infielders: Erve Beck; Bill Bradley; Truck Eagan; Russ Hall; Bill Hallman; Candy LaChance; Jim McGuire; Frank Scheibeck; Danny Shay	Outfielders: Ed Cermak; Frank Cross; Tom Donovan; Shorty Gallagher; Frank Genins; Zaza Harvey; Malachi Hogan; Jimmy McAleer; Jack McCarthy; Jack O'Brien; Ollie Pickering	Manager: Jimmy McAleer

== Player stats ==
=== Key ===
Statistic^{†}	Indicates sole team leader in this category among batters (player must qualify by MLB rules to lead a category)
Statistic^{§}	Indicates sole team leader in this category among pitchers (player must qualify by MLB rules to lead a category)
*	Indicates that two or more players tied for the lead in the category

=== Batting ===
==== Starters by position ====
Note: Pos = Position; G = Games played; AB = At bats; R = Runs; H = Hits; 2B = Doubles; 3B = Triples; Avg. = Batting average; HR = Home runs; RBI = Runs batted in; SB = Stolen bases

Pos	Player	G	AB	R	H	2B	3B	Avg.	HR	RBI	SB
C	Bob Wood	98	346	45	101	23	3	.292	1	49	6
1B	Candy LaChance	133	548^{†}	81	166	22	9	.303	1	75	11
2B	Erve Beck	135	539	78	156	26	8	.289	6^{†}	79^{†}	7
3B	Bill Bradley	133	516	95	151	28^{†}	13^{†}	.293	1	55	15
SS	Frank Scheibeck	93	329	33	70	11	3	.213	0	38	3
LF	Jack McCarthy	86	343	60	110	14	7	.321	0	32	9
CF	Ollie Pickering	137^{†}	547	102^{†}	169^{†}	25	6	.309^{†}	0	40	36^{†}
RF	Jack O'Brien	92	375	54	106	14	5	.286	0	39	13

==== Other batters ====
Note: G = Games played; AB = At bats; R = Runs; H = Hits; 2B = Doubles; 3B = Triples; Avg. = Batting average; HR = Home runs; RBI = Runs batted in; SB = Stolen bases

Player	G	AB	R	H	2B	3B	Avg.	HR	RBI	SB
Zaza Harvey	45	170	21	60	5	5	.353	1	24	15
George Yeager	39	139	13	31	5	0	.223	0	14	2
Joe Connor	37	121	13	17	3	1	.140	0	6	2
Frank Genins	26	101	15	23	5	0	.228	0	9	3
Danny Shay	19	75	4	17	2	2	.227	0	10	0
Tom Donovan	18	71	9	18	3	1	.254	0	5	1
Jim McGuire	18	69	4	16	2	0	.232	0	3	0
Bill Hallman	5	19	2	4	0	0	.211	0	3	0
Truck Eagan	5	18	2	3	0	1	.167	0	2	0
Jimmy McAleer	3	7	0	1	0	0	.143	0	0	0
Frank Cross	1	5	0	3	0	0	.600	0	0	0
Ed Cermak	1	4	0	0	0	0	.000	0	0	0
Shorty Gallagher	2	4	0	0	0	0	.000	0	0	0
Russ Hall	1	4	2	2	0	0	.500	0	0	0
Malachi Hogan	1	4	0	0	0	0	.000	0	0	0
Paddy Livingston	1	2	0	0	0	0	.000	0	0	0

Note: pitchers' batting statistics not included

=== Pitching ===
==== Starting pitchers ====
Note: G = Games pitched; GS = Games started; IP = Innings pitched; W = Wins; L = Losses; ERA = Earned run average; R = Runs allowed; ER = Earned runs allowed; BB = Walks SO = Strikeouts

Player	G	GS	IP	W	L	ERA	R	ER	BB	K
Pete Dowling	33^{§}	30*	256.1^{§}	11	22	3.86	160^{§}	110^{§}	104	99*
Earl Moore	31	30*	251.1	16^{§}	14	2.90	129	81	107^{§}	99*
Bill Hart	20	19	157.2	7	11	3.77	109	66	57	48
Ed Scott	17	16	124.2	6	6	4.40	82	61	38	23
Jack Bracken	12	12	100.0	4	8	6.21	94	69	31	18
Harry McNeal	12	10	85.1	5	5	4.43	68	42	30	15
Bill Cristall	6	6	48.1	1	5	4.84	42	26	30	12
Dick Braggins	4	3	32.0	1	2	4.78	28	17	15	1
Bock Baker	1	1	8.0	0	1	5.63	13	5	6	0

==== Other pitchers ====
Note: W = Wins; L = Losses; ERA = Earned run average; G = Games pitched; GS = Games started; SV = Saves; IP = Innings pitched; R = Runs allowed; ER = Earned runs allowed; BB = Walks SO = Strikeouts

Player	G	GS	IP	W	L	SV	ERA	R	ER	BB	K
Bill Hoffer	16	10	99.0	3	8	3^{§}	4.55	78	50	35	19
Gus Weyhing	2	1	11.1	0	0	0	7.94	11	10	5	0

==== Relief pitchers ====
Note: G = Games pitched; GS = Games started; W = Wins; L = Losses; SV = Saves; ERA = Earned run average; IP = Innings pitched; R = Runs allowed; ER = Earned runs allowed; BB = Walks SO = Strikeouts

Player	G	IP	W	L	SV	ERA	R	ER	BB	K
Tom Donovan	1	7.0	0	0	0	5.14	11	4	3	0
Bill Bradley	1	1.0	0	0	0	0.00	3	0	0	0
Jimmy McAleer	1	0.1	0	0	0	0.00	3	0	3	0

== Awards and honors ==
=== League top five finishers ===
Ollie Pickering

- #5 in AL in stolen bases (36)
- #5 in AL in singles (138)
