= 1901 Chicago White Stockings season =

1901 Chicago White Stockings
- American League champions
- League: American League
- Ballpark: South Side Park
- City: Chicago, Illinois
- Record: 83–53 (.610)
- League place: 1st
- Owners: Charles Comiskey
- Managers: Clark Griffith

The 1901 Chicago White Stockings season was their first season as a major league team, and their second season in Chicago. It was also the inaugural season of American League as a major league.

The White Stockings had a very balanced lineup, which was led by outfielders Dummy Hoy and Fielder Jones, and scored the most runs in the AL. They relied primarily on speed, as Frank Isbell, Sam Mertes, and Jones finished 1–2–3 in stolen bases. The pitching staff was anchored by Clark Griffith, who went 24–7 with a 2.67 ERA.

The White Stockings finished 83–53. They won the pennant by four games.

== Offseason ==
- In 1900, the Western League changed its name to the American League. It was still officially a minor league, subject to the governing National Agreement and an underling of the National League. The NL actually gave permission to the AL to put a team in Chicago, and Comiskey moved his St. Paul club to Chicago's South Side. After the season, the AL declined to renew its membership in the National Agreement, and the war was on. After acquiring a number of stars from the older league, including pitcher and manager Clark Griffith, the White Stockings also captured the AL's first major-league pennant the next year, in 1901.

== Regular season ==
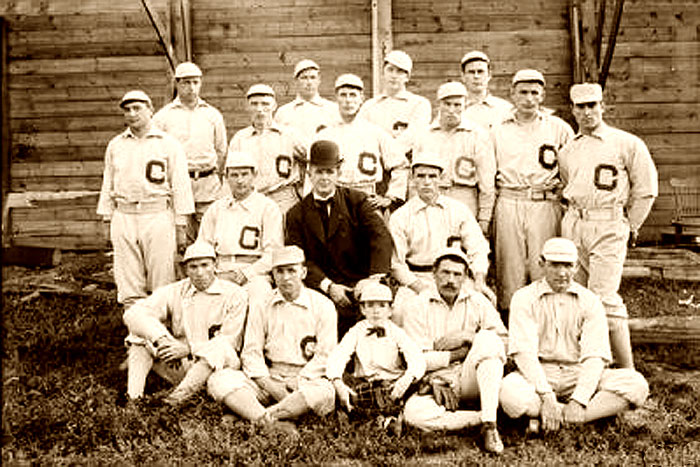
The 1901 Chicago White Stockings

- May 9, 1901: Earl Moore of the Cleveland Blues threw the first no-hitter in the history of the American League against the White Stockings. Chicago beat the Blues by a score of 4–2 despite not having one hit.

=== Season standings ===
American League
Team	W	L	Pct.	GB	Home	Road
Chicago White Stockings	83	53	.610	—	49‍–‍21	34‍–‍32
Boston Americans	79	57	.581	4	49‍–‍20	30‍–‍37
Detroit Tigers	74	61	.548	8½	42‍–‍27	32‍–‍34
Philadelphia Athletics	74	62	.544	9	42‍–‍24	32‍–‍38
Baltimore Orioles	68	65	.511	13½	40‍–‍25	28‍–‍40
Washington Senators	61	72	.459	20½	31‍–‍35	30‍–‍37
Cleveland Blues	54	82	.397	29	28‍–‍39	26‍–‍43
Milwaukee Brewers	48	89	.350	35½	32‍–‍37	16‍–‍52

=== Record vs. opponents ===
1901 American League record Sources:
Team	BAL	BOS	CWS	CLE	DET	MIL	PHA	WSH
Baltimore	—	9–9	4–14–1	11–9	9–10	12–7–1	12–8	11–8
Boston	9–9	—	12–8	12–6	9–11–1	15–5	10–10	12–8–1
Chicago	14–4–1	8–12	—	13–7	10–10	16–4	12–8	10–8
Cleveland	9–11	6–12	7–13	—	6–14	11–9	6–14	9–9–2
Detroit	10–9	11–9–1	10–10	14–6	—	13–7	7–9	9–11
Milwaukee	7–12–1	5–15	4–16	9–11	7–13	—	6–14	10–8–1
Philadelphia	8–12	10–10	8–12	14–6	9–7	14–6	—	11–9–1
Washington	8–11	8–12–1	8–10	9–9–2	11–9	8–10–1	9–11–1	—

=== Roster ===
1901 Chicago White Stockings
Roster
Pitchers: Nixey Callahan; Frank Dupee; Clark Griffith; Zaza Harvey; Jack Katoll; Jack McAleese; Roy Patterson; Wiley Piatt; John Skopec	Catchers: Joe Sugden; Billy Sullivan; Infielders: Dave Brain; Jimmy Burke; Fred Hartman; Frank Isbell; Sam Mertes; Frank Shugart	Outfielders: Pop Foster; Dummy Hoy; Fielder Jones; Herm McFarland	Manager: Clark Griffith

=== Game log ===
1901 White Stockings Game Log
April (4–2)

#	Date	Opponent	Score	Record
1	April 24	Cleveland Blues	8–2	1–0
2	April 25	Cleveland Blues	7–3	2–0
3	April 27	Cleveland Blues	4–10	2–1
4	April 28	Cleveland Blues	13–1	3–1
5	April 29	Detroit Tigers	2–3	3–2
6	April 30	Detroit Tigers	4–2	4–2

May (20–7)

#	Date	Opponent	Score	Record
7	May 1	Detroit Tigers	19–9	5–2
8	May 2	Detroit Tigers	5–7	5–3
9	May 3	@ Milwaukee Brewers	11–3	6–3
10	May 4	@ Milwaukee Brewers	11–3	7–3
11	May 5	@ Milwaukee Brewers	7–21	7–4
12	May 6	@ Milwaukee Brewers	6–3	8–4
13	May 8	@ Cleveland Blues	3–1	9–4
14	May 9	@ Cleveland Blues	4–2	10–4
15	May 10	@ Cleveland Blues	5–4	11–4
16	May 11	@ Detroit Tigers	4–9	11–5
17	May 12	@ Detroit Tigers	5–7	11–6
18	May 13	@ Detroit Tigers	7–8	11–7
19	May 14	@ Detroit Tigers	6–2	12–7
20	May 16	Milwaukee Brewers	14–1	13–7
21	May 17	Milwaukee Brewers	7–6	14–7
22	May 18	Milwaukee Brewers	5–3	15–7
23	May 19	Milwaukee Brewers	14–3	16–7
24	May 22	Philadelphia Athletics	5–9	16–8
25	May 23	Philadelphia Athletics	11–9	17–8
26	May 25	Philadelphia Athletics	6–5	18–8
27	May 26	Baltimore Orioles	5–0	19–8
28	May 27	Baltimore Orioles	10–3	20–8
29	May 28	Baltimore Orioles	5–14	20–9
30	May 29	Baltimore Orioles	7–4	21–9
31–1	May 30	Boston Americans	8–3	22–9
32–2	May 30	Boston Americans	5–3	23–9
33	May 31	Boston Americans	10–5	24–9

June (13–11)

#	Date	Opponent	Score	Record
34	June 1	Boston Americans	5–10	24–10
35	June 2	Washington Senators	5–7	24–11
36	June 3	Washington Senators	3–5	24–12
37	June 4	Washington Senators	3–2	25–12
38	June 7	@ Washington Senators	15–4	26–12
39	June 8	@ Washington Senators	3–8	26–13
40	June 10	@ Washington Senators	13–10	27–13
41	June 11	@ Washington Senators	1–3	27–14
42	June 12	@ Baltimore Orioles	1–8	27–15
43	June 13	@ Baltimore Orioles	12–0	28–15
44	June 14	@ Baltimore Orioles	10–5	29–15
45–1	June 17	@ Boston Americans	1–11	29–16
46–2	June 17	@ Boston Americans	4–10	29–17
47	June 18	@ Boston Americans	3–4	29–18
48	June 19	@ Boston Americans	3–5	29–19
49	June 20	@ Boston Americans	3–4	29–20
50	June 21	@ Philadelphia Athletics	4–0	30–20
51	June 22	@ Philadelphia Athletics	6–4	31–20
52	June 24	@ Philadelphia Athletics	7–5	32–20
53	June 25	@ Philadelphia Athletics	5–0	33–20
54	June 27	Cleveland Blues	5–1	34–20
55	June 28	Cleveland Blues	7–6	35–20
56	June 29	Cleveland Blues	4–1	36–20
57	June 30	Detroit Tigers	4–2	37–20

July (17–9)

#	Date	Opponent	Score	Record
58	July 2	Detroit Tigers	3–2	38–20
59	July 3	@ Cleveland Blues	4–3	39–20
60–1	July 4	@ Cleveland Blues	2–8	39–21
61–2	July 4	@ Cleveland Blues	5–6	39–22
62	July 5	@ Detroit Tigers	8–4	40–22
63	July 6	@ Detroit Tigers	5–6	40–23
64	July 7	@ Detroit Tigers	3–8	40–24
65	July 9	@ Milwaukee Brewers	17–9	41–24
66	July 10	@ Milwaukee Brewers	5–4	42–24
67	July 11	@ Milwaukee Brewers	5–1	43–24
68	July 12	Milwaukee Brewers	14–1	44–24
69	July 13	Milwaukee Brewers	2–3	44–25
70	July 14	Milwaukee Brewers	4–0	45–25
71	July 17	Baltimore Orioles	4–2	46–25
72	July 18	Baltimore Orioles	9–1	47–25
73	July 19	Baltimore Orioles	4–7	47–26
74	July 20	Philadelphia Athletics	6–8	47–27
75	July 21	Philadelphia Athletics	9–4	48–27
76	July 22	Philadelphia Athletics	1–2	48–28
77	July 23	Philadelphia Athletics	10–6	49–28
78	July 24	Washington Senators	17–3	50–28
79	July 25	Washington Senators	4–1	51–28
80	July 26	Washington Senators	2–1	52–28
81	July 27	Boston Americans	8–7	53–28
82	July 29	Boston Americans	1–4	53–29
83	July 31	Detroit Tigers	2–0	54–29

August (13–13–1)

#	Date	Opponent	Score	Record
84	August 1	Detroit Tigers	4–0	55–29
85	August 2	Detroit Tigers	7–0	56–29
86	August 3	Detroit Tigers	6–8	56–30
87	August 4	Cleveland Blues	9–5	57–30
88	August 5	Cleveland Blues	3–6	57–31
89	August 7	@ Detroit Tigers	3–9	57–32
90	August 8	@ Detroit Tigers	18–8	58–32
91	August 9	@ Detroit Tigers	1–12	58–33
92	August 10	@ Cleveland Blues	7–11	58–34
93	August 11	Cleveland Blues	3–4	58–35
94	August 12	@ Cleveland Blues	17–2	59–35
95–1	August 13	@ Cleveland Blues	0–4	59–36
96–2	August 13	@ Cleveland Blues	14–1	60–36
97	August 16	@ Boston Americans	2–6	60–37
98	August 17	@ Boston Americans	2–4	60–38
99	August 19	@ Washington Senators	2–5	60–39
100	August 20	@ Washington Senators	9–3	61–39
101	August 21	@ Washington Senators	0–8	61–40
102	August 22	@ Baltimore Orioles	6–5	62–40
103	August 23	@ Baltimore Orioles	6–4	63–40
104	August 24	@ Baltimore Orioles	4–10	63–41
105	August 26	@ Philadelphia Athletics	11–4	64–41
106	August 27	@ Philadelphia Athletics	5–7	64–42
107	August 28	@ Philadelphia Athletics	3–0	65–42
108	August 30	Baltimore Orioles	5–5	65 – 42 – 1
109–1	August 31	Baltimore Orioles	12–2	66 – 42 – 1
110–2	August 31	Baltimore Orioles	5–2	67 – 42 – 1

September (16–11)

#	Date	Opponent	Score	Record
111	September 1	Baltimore Orioles	6–3	68 – 42 – 1
112–1	September 2	Philadelphia Athletics	2–0	69 – 42 – 1
113–2	September 2	Philadelphia Athletics	9–10	69 – 43 – 1
114	September 3	Philadelphia Athletics	2–3	69 – 44 – 1
115	September 4	Washington Senators	9–5	70 – 44 – 1
116–1	September 5	Washington Senators	4–3	71 – 44 – 1
117–2	September 5	Washington Senators	7–9	71 – 45 – 1
118	September 6	Washington Senators	3–5	71 – 46 – 1
119	September 7	Boston Americans	4–1	72 – 46 – 1
120	September 8	Boston Americans	4–3	73 – 46 – 1
121–1	September 9	Boston Americans	4–3	74 – 46 – 1
122–2	September 9	Boston Americans	6–4	75 – 46 – 1
123	September 10	@ Milwaukee Brewers	6–3	76 – 46 – 1
124–1	September 12	@ Milwaukee Brewers	1–5	76 – 47 – 1
125–2	September 12	@ Milwaukee Brewers	4–0	77 – 47 – 1
126	September 13	Milwaukee Brewers	3–5	77 – 48 – 1
127–1	September 15	Milwaukee Brewers	5–4	78 – 48 – 1
128–2	September 15	Milwaukee Brewers	9–4	79 – 48 – 1
129–1	September 18	@ Baltimore Orioles	10–3	80 – 48 – 1
130–2	September 18	@ Baltimore Orioles	5–1	81 – 48 – 1
131	September 20	@ Philadelphia Athletics	8–3	82 – 48 – 1
132	September 21	@ Philadelphia Athletics	4–10	82 – 49 – 1
133	September 23	@ Philadelphia Athletics	3–5	82 – 50 – 1
134	September 24	@ Boston Americans	3–8	82 – 51 – 1
135	September 25	@ Boston Americans	2–5	82 – 52 – 1
136	September 26	@ Boston Americans	2–3	82 – 53 – 1
137	September 27	@ Washington Senators	6–4	83 – 53 – 1

== Player stats ==
=== Batting ===
==== Starters by position ====
Note: Pos = Position; G = Games played; AB = At bats; R = Runs scored; H = Hits; 2B = Doubles; 3B = Triples; Avg.= Batting average; HR = Home runs; RBI = Runs batted in; SB = Stolen bases

Pos	Player	G	AB	R	H	2B	3B	Avg.	HR	RBI	SB
C	Billy Sullivan	98	367	54	90	15	6	.245	4	56	12
1B	Frank Isbell	137	556	93	143	15	8	.257	3	70	52
2B	Sam Mertes	137	545	94	151	16	17	.277	5	98	46
3B	Fred Hartman	120	473	77	147	23	13	.309	3	89	31
SS	Frank Shugart	107	415	62	104	9	12	.251	2	47	12
LF	Herm McFarland	132	473	83	130	21	9	.275	4	59	33
CF	Dummy Hoy	132	527	112	155	28	11	.294	2	60	27
RF	Fielder Jones	133	521	120	162	16	3	.311	2	65	38

==== Other batters ====
Note: G = Games played; AB = At bats; R = Runs scored; H = Hits; 2B = Doubles; 3B = Triples; Avg. = Batting average; HR = Home runs; RBI = Runs batted in; SB = Stolen bases

Player	G	AB	R	H	2B	3B	Avg.	HR	RBI	SB
Joe Sugden	48	153	21	42	7	1	.275	0	19	4
Jimmy Burke	42	148	20	39	5	0	.264	0	21	11
Pop Foster	12	35	4	10	2	2	.286	1	6	0
Dave Brain	5	20	2	7	1	0	.350	0	5	0

=== Pitching ===
==== Starting pitchers ====
Note: G = Games pitched; GS = Games started; IP = Innings pitched; W = Wins; L = Losses; ERA = Earned run average; BB = Walks allowed; K = Strikeouts

Player	G	GS	IP	W	L	ERA	BB	K
Roy Patterson	41	35	312.1	20	16	3.37	62	127
Clark Griffith	35	30	266.2	24	7	2.67	50	67
Jack Katoll	27	25	208.0	11	10	2.81	53	59
Nixey Callahan	27	22	215.1	15	8	2.42	50	70
John Skopec	9	9	68.1	6	3	3.16	45	24
Wiley Piatt	7	6	51.2	4	2	2.79	14	19
Frank Dupee	1	1	0	0	1	inf	3	0

==== Other pitchers ====
Note: G = Games pitched; GS = Games started; IP = Innings pitched; W = Wins; L = Losses; SV = Saves; ERA = Earned run average; BB = Walks allowed; K = Strikeouts

Player	G	GS	IP	W	L	SV	ERA	BB	K
Zaza Harvey	16	9	92.0	3	6	1	3.62	59	37

==== Relief pitchers ====
Note: G = Games pitched; IP = Innings pitched; W = Wins; L = Losses; SV = Saves; ERA = Earned run average; BB = Walks allowed; K = Strikeouts

Player	G	IP	W	L	SV	ERA	BB	K
Jack McAleese	1	3.0	0	0	0	9.00	1	1
Frank Isbell	1	1.0	0	0	0	9.00	0	0

== Individual league top five finishes ==
Nixey Callahan

- #2 in AL in earned run average (2.42)

Clark Griffith

- AL leader in shutouts (5)
- #3 in AL in wins (24)
- #4 in AL in earned run average (2.67)

Dummy Hoy

- #4 in AL in runs scored (112)
- #4 in AL in on-base percentage (.407)

Frank Isbell

- MLB leader in stolen bases (52)

Fielder Jones

- #2 in AL in runs scored (120)
- #2 in AL in on-base percentage (.412)
- #3 in AL in stolen bases (38)
- #4 in AL in runs batted in (98)

Sam Mertes

- #2 in AL in stolen bases (46)

Roy Patterson

- #2 in AL in strikeouts (127)
- #3 in AL in shutouts (4)
