= Gates Iron Works =

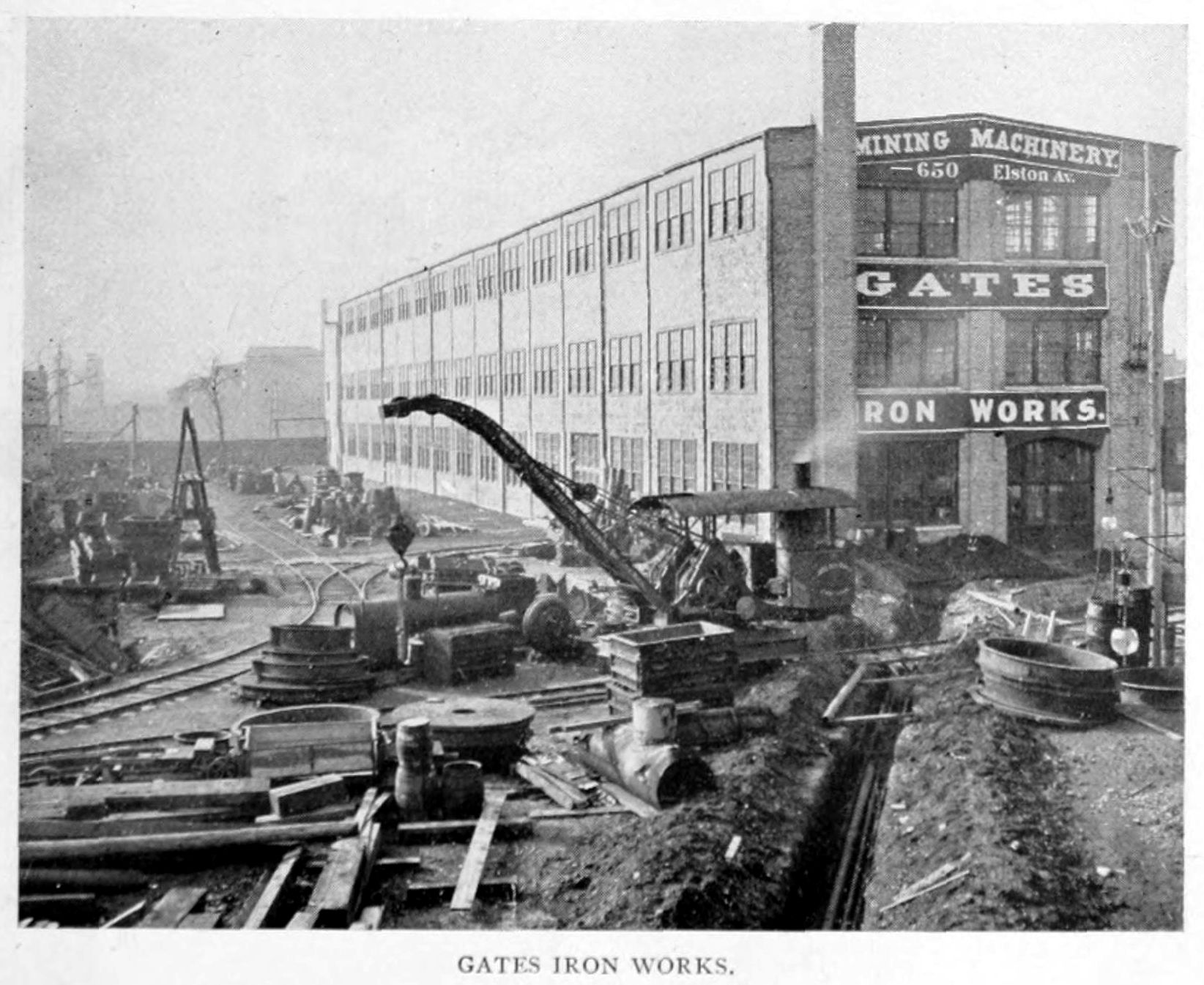
Gates Iron Works, Chicago, 1896

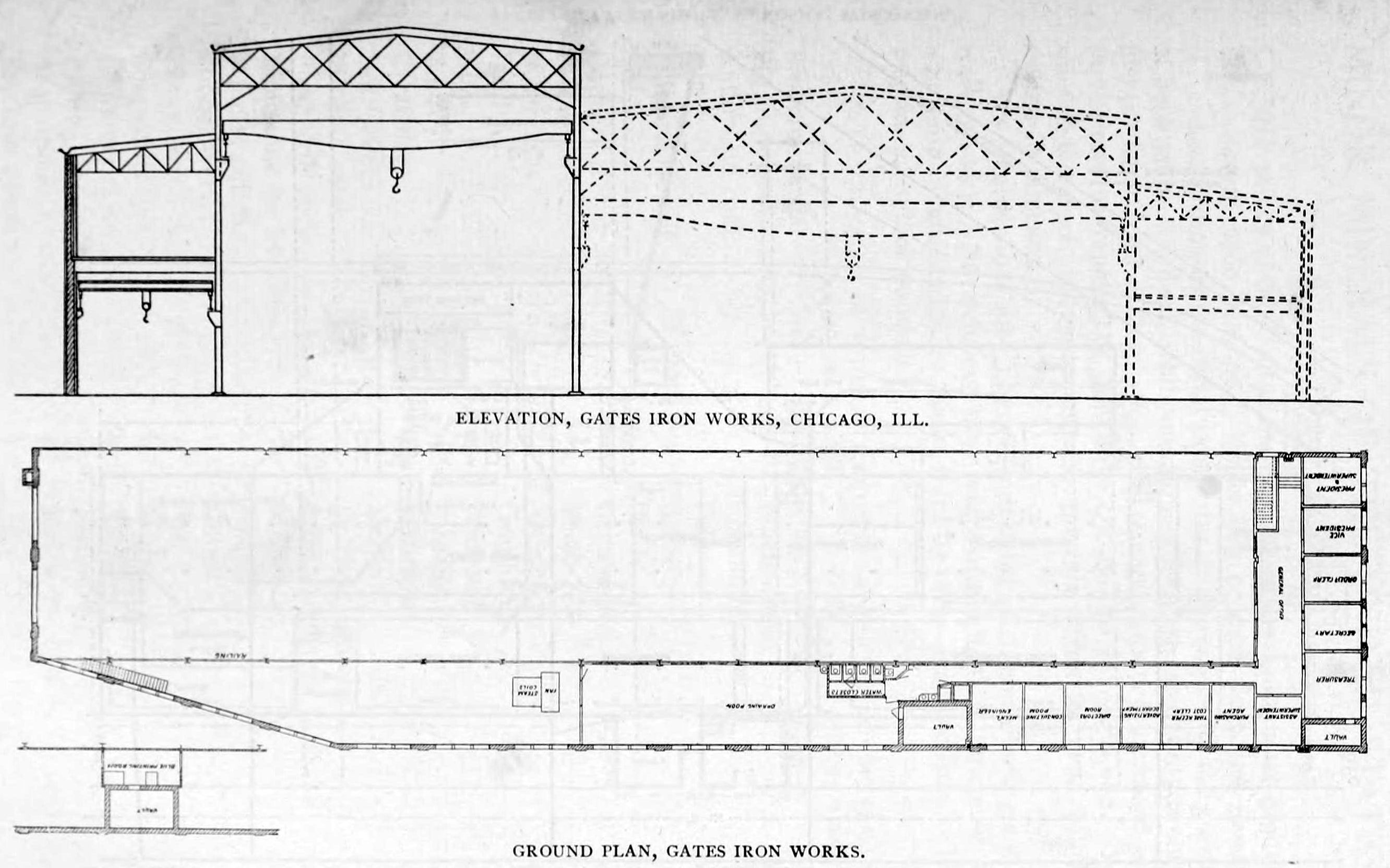
Gates Iron Works, Ground Plan, 1896

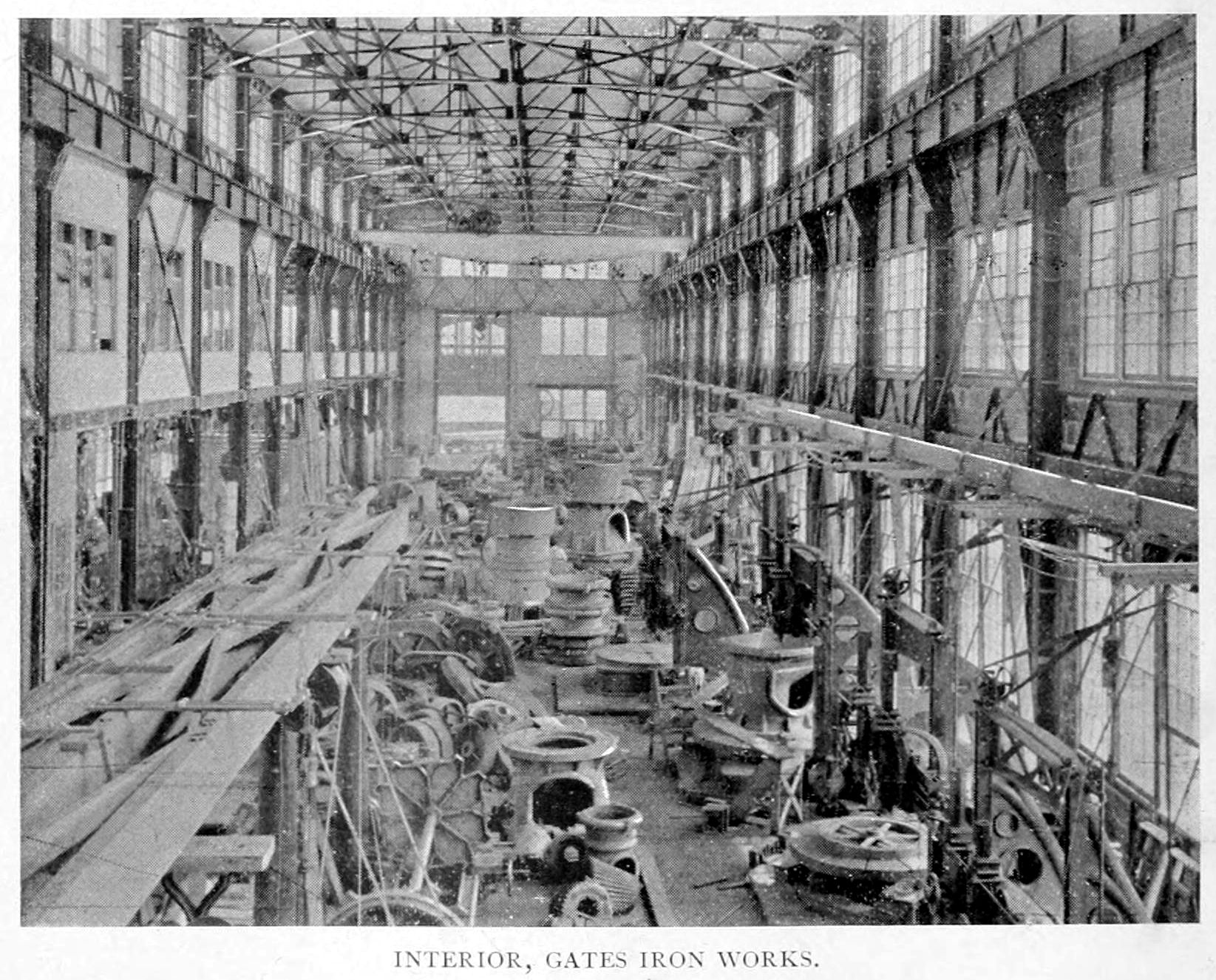
Gates Iron Works, Interior, 1896.

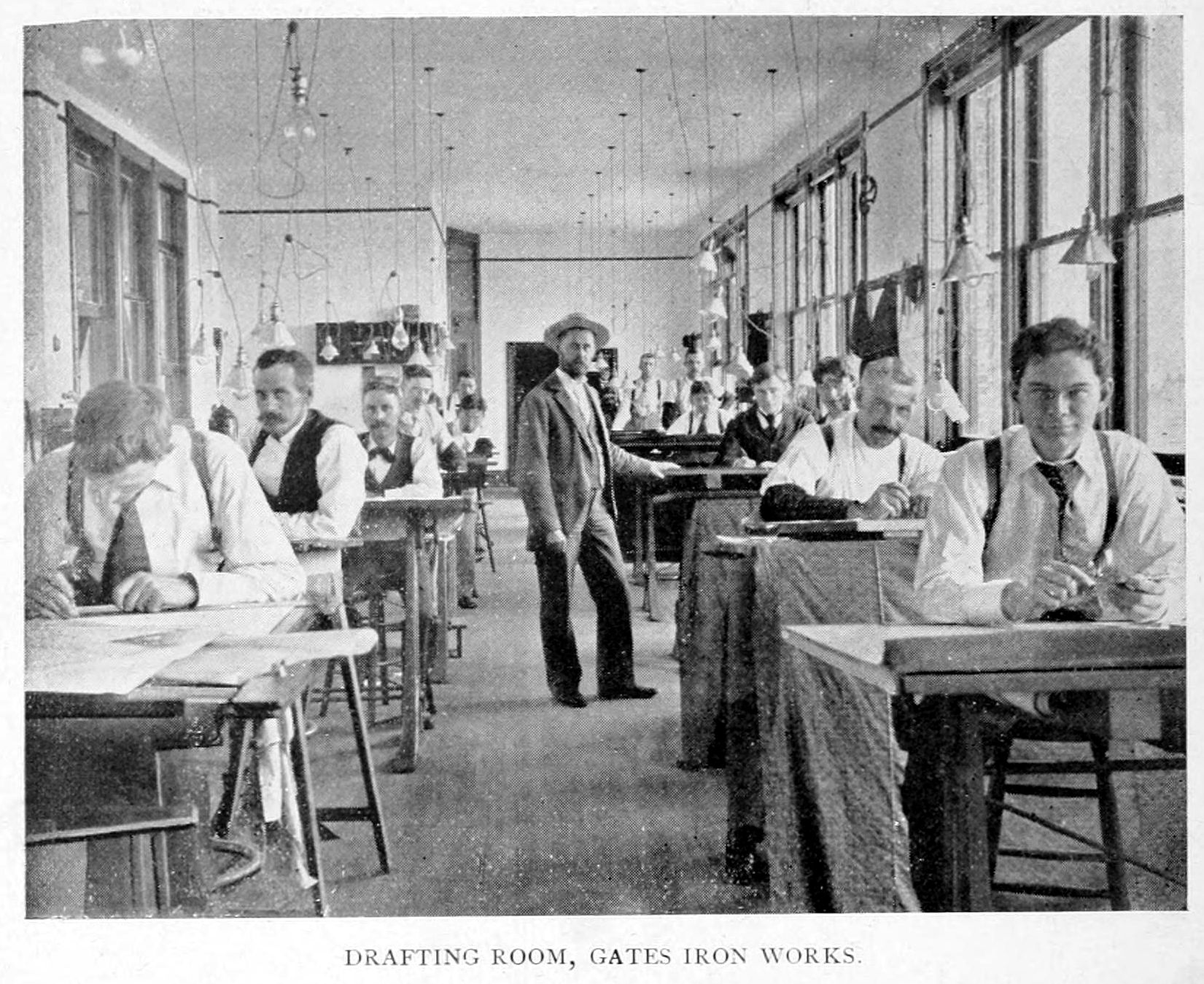
Gates Iron Works, Drafting Room, 1896

Gates Iron Works was a U.S. manufacturer of machinery, specialized in rock and cement milling equipment. It was based in Chicago and merged into the Allis-Chalmers Company in 1901

== History ==
=== Origin ===
Thomas Chalmers was a Scottish immigrant to America who came to the U.S. about 1842. By 1844 he was at Chicago, Illinois and had found work with P.W. Gates, whose foundry and blacksmithing shops produced plows, wagons, and flour-milling equipment.

The Gates firm "built the first steam-operated sawmill in the country at a time when Chicago was the leading producer of milled lumber in the country."

=== 1870s-90s ===
In 1872, Thomas Chalmers founded the Fraser & Chalmers firm to manufacture mining machinery, boilers, and pumps. By 1880 steam engines were part of the product line and by 1890, the firm had become one of the world's largest manufacturers of mining equipment. Thomas Chalmers's son, William James Chalmers, was president of the company from circa 1890 to 1901. Meanwhile, the Gates Iron Works, with Chalmers family involvement, had become a manufacturer of crushers, pulverizers, and other rock and cement milling equipment.

Another Scottish immigrant family, the Dickson family, came to Canada and the U.S. in the 1830s. By 1852, they had organized a small machine shop and foundry (Dickson & Company) in Scranton, Pennsylvania. In 1856 Thomas Dickson became its president, and in 1862 the firm incorporated as the Dickson Manufacturing Company. By 1900 they were building boilers, steam engines, locomotives, internal combustion engines, blowers, and air compressors.

=== Merger, 1901 ===
By 1901 the principals of the Edward P. Allis, Fraser & Chalmers, and Gates firms had decided to merge their companies. Edwin Reynolds believed Allis could control the industrial engine business. In May 1901 the Allis-Chalmers Company was formed.

It acquired Dickson's industrial engine business. Dickson's locomotive business was rolled into the new locomotive consolidation, the American Locomotive Company (ALCO).
