= Braggins =

Braggins is a surname. Notable people with the surname include:

- Dave Braggins (1945–2004), Canadian football player
- Dick Braggins (1879–1963), American baseball player
- John E. Braggins (1944–2025), New Zealand botanist and bryologist
