= Jack Bracken =

Jack Bracken may refer to:

- Jack Bracken (baseball)
- Jack Bracken (rugby union)
