= Shorty Gallagher =

American baseball player (1872–1924)

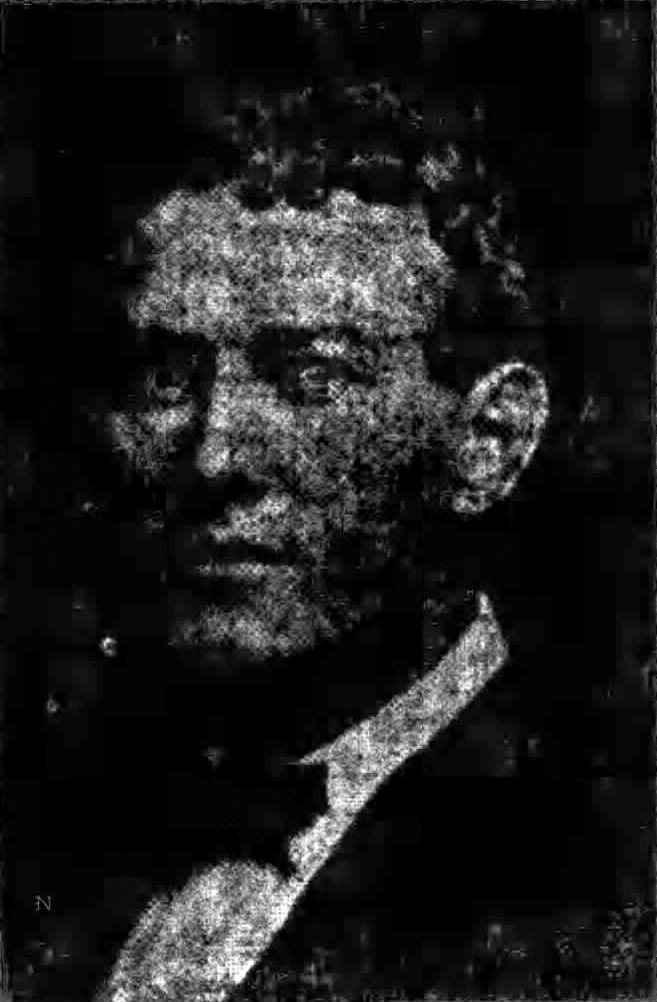
- Gallagher in 1902
- Outfielder
- Born: April 30, 1872; Detroit, Michigan, U.S.
- Died: June 23, 1924 (aged 52); Detroit, Michigan, U.S.
- Batted: Unknown Threw: Unknown

MLB debut
- August 13, 1901, for the Cleveland Bluebirds

Last MLB appearance
- August 13, 1901, for the Cleveland Bluebirds

MLB statistics
- Batting average: .000
- Home runs: 0
- Runs batted in: 0
- Stats at Baseball Reference

Teams
- Cleveland Bluebirds (1901)

Charles William "Shorty" Gallagher (April 30, 1872 – June 23, 1924) was an American Major League Baseball (MLB) player for one season. He played two games for the Cleveland Bluebirds (now Guardians) during the 1901 Cleveland Bluebirds season. A decades-long search for a photo of Gallagher ended when a 1902 photo of him was discovered in January 2026.

== Biography ==
Charles William Gallagher was born in Detroit on April 30, 1872. His parents were married. Gallagher never married and did not have a large family. In addition to "Shorty", he also had the nickname "Chubby". He began playing baseball as a child. At the age of 16, he weighed 110 pounds (50 kg) and was five feet three inches (160 cm) tall. Before he appeared in the major leagues, Gallagher played for minor league teams in Illinois, Indiana, Michigan, Missouri, New Jersey, Ohio, Pennsylvania, and West Virginia, and in the Canadian province of Ontario. He had played in the Iron and Oil and Canadian Leagues. In July 1901, he played for the Wheeling Stogies.

On August 13, 1901, Gallagher played on the Cleveland Bluebirds roster in a doubleheader against the Chicago White Sox at League Park. In the first game, he played in the right field and did not make a plate appearance. In the second game, he batted four times, going hitless and getting struck out. The Cleveland Plain Dealer did not approve of him playing on the team, saying that the other players were too fast for him. He did not make another major league appearance.

Gallagher joined the minor league New Orleans Pelicans in 1902 and played with them for 16 games. From 1891 to 1910, Gallagher was associated with baseball in some way. He was an umpire for some time. His contemporaries observed that he was "electrifying" on base and played well in center field.

He died on June 23, 1924, at the age of 52. His grave is at Mount Olivet Cemetery in Detroit.

== Posthumous search for photograph of Gallagher ==
In the early 1990s, Cleveland baseball fan Randy Kula began collecting photographs of every person who had played for Cleveland's team since 1914, later expanding it to every player since the team debuted in the American League in 1901. By 2004, Kula had acquired a photograph of all 1,900+ players except Gallagher. Kula pored over old newspapers and census records and contacted many people whom he suspected could have had a photograph of Gallagher, but was unsuccessful. He was not alone in his search, with Clarence "Lefty" Blasco, Chris Rainey, and Justin McKinney of the Society for American Baseball Research Pictorial History Research Committee, which aims to acquire a photograph of every person to play in the major leagues since 1871, also searching for a photograph of Gallagher. McKinney had been inspired by Kula's search and made notes on Gallagher's life from 1891 to 1910 in an attempt to discover a photograph. In January 2026, McKinney discovered a photograph of Gallagher in a 1902 edition of the New Orleans Daily Picayune. The Daily Picayune published photographs of players who had recently joined the Pelicans, such as Gallagher. McKinney found the photograph by instead searching for Adam Vogt, who joined the team on the same day as Gallagher. Despite Gallagher's last name being more common, McKinney knew that newspapers frequently included typos or had errors created when digitized, meaning a photograph of Gallagher may have been obscured from search. McKinney found a photograph of Gallagher alongside a photograph of Vogt, except Gallagher's name had been misspelled in the image's caption as "Gallegher". The difficulty in finding a photograph of Gallagher has been attributed to the high frequency with which he changed teams.
