= Malachi Hogan =

American baseball player (1878-1945)

- Outfielder
- Born: April 16, 1878; Broadway, Ohio, U.S.
- Died: March 4, 1945 (aged 66); Cleveland, Ohio, U.S.
- Batted: Unknown Threw: Unknown

MLB debut
- August 13, 1901, for the Cleveland Bluebirds

Last MLB appearance
- August 13, 1901, for the Cleveland Bluebirds

MLB statistics
- Batting average: .000
- Home runs: 0
- Runs batted in: 0
- Stats at Baseball Reference

Teams
- Cleveland Bluebirds (1901)

Malachi Sylvanus Hogan (April 16, 1878 – March 4, 1945) was an American Major League Baseball outfielder who played for one season. He played in one game for the Cleveland Blues on August 13 during the 1901 Cleveland Bluebirds season.
