= Frank Dupee =

American baseball player (1877–1956)

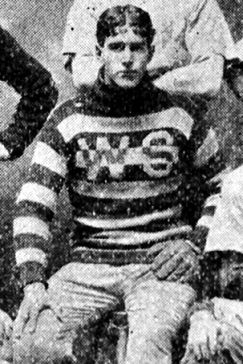
- Pitcher
- Born: April 29, 1877; Monkton, Vermont, U.S.
- Died: August 14, 1956 (aged 79); Falmouth, Maine, U.S.
- Batted: Unknown Threw: Right

MLB debut
- August 24, 1901, for the Chicago White Sox

Last MLB appearance
- August 24, 1901, for the Chicago White Sox

MLB statistics
- Games played: 1
- Innings pitched: 0
- Earned Run Average: ∞
- Win–loss record: 0-1
- Stats at Baseball Reference

Teams
- Chicago White Sox (1901)

Frank Oliver Dupee (April 29, 1877 – August 14, 1956) was an American pitcher in Major League Baseball.

Dupee started one game for the 1901 Chicago White Stockings on August 24. He faced three batters and walked all three before getting pulled. All three came around to score, and Dupee was hung with the loss. As he never pitched again in the majors, he became one of 19 players to retire with an ERA of infinity.

Dupee's minor league records are fragmentary, but according to research done by the Society for American Baseball Research, Dupee had pitched well enough in the 1901 season in the minors (a 10–6 record with two teams in the New England League) to warrant his call-up. However, his inability to throw strikes meant that Dupee was sent back down to the minors in September 1901, and sold to the New York Giants in the off-season.

Dupee impressed Giants manager John McGraw at the Giants 1902 spring training camp, but he injured his arm before the season began and was again sent to the minors. Dupee played as a semi-regular for four different New England League teams in the 1902 season, appearing more often as an outfielder than as a pitcher.

Dupee spent a total of 13 seasons in the minors as a pitcher, never getting a shot at the majors again. McGraw later claimed that Dupee was the only pitcher he had ever seen who threw with the same speed as Hall of Famer Walter Johnson, universally acknowledged as the fastest pitcher of his era.
