= Harry McNeal =

American baseball player (1878-1945)

- Pitcher
- Born: August 11, 1877; Iberia, Ohio
- Died: January 11, 1945 (aged 67); Cleveland, Ohio
- Batted: Right Threw: Right

MLB debut
- August 5, 1901, for the Cleveland Bluebirds

Last MLB appearance
- September 26, 1901, for the Cleveland Bluebirds

MLB statistics
- Win–loss record: 5–5
- Earned run average: 4.43
- Strikeouts: 15
- Stats at Baseball Reference

Teams
- Cleveland Bluebirds (1901)

John Harley McNeal (August 11, 1878 – January 11, 1945) was a Major League Baseball pitcher who appeared in 12 games for the Cleveland Bluebirds in their 1901 season.
