= Jim McGuire (shortstop) =

American baseball player (1875–1917)

- Shortstop
- Born: February 4, 1875; Dunkirk, New York, U.S.
- Died: January 26, 1917 (aged 41); Buffalo, New York, U.S.
- Batted: Unknown Threw: Right

MLB debut
- September 10, 1901, for the Cleveland Bluebirds

Last MLB appearance
- September 28, 1901, for the Cleveland Bluebirds

MLB statistics
- Batting average: .232
- Home runs: 0
- Runs batted in: 3
- Stats at Baseball Reference

Teams
- Cleveland Bluebirds (1901)

James A. McGuire (February 4, 1875 – January 26, 1917) was an American Major League Baseball shortstop who played for one season. He played for the Cleveland Blues for 18 games during the 1901 Cleveland Bluebirds season.
