= Jack McAleese =

American baseball player (1878–1950)

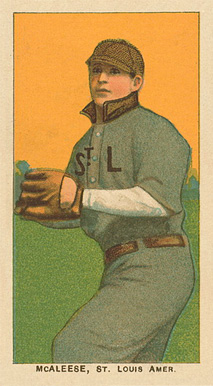
- McAleese depicted on a T-206 baseball card with the Browns
- Pitcher/Outfielder
- Born: August 22, 1878; Sharon, Pennsylvania, U.S.
- Died: November 15, 1950 (aged 72); New York City, New York, U.S.
- Batted: Right Threw: Right

MLB debut
- August 10, 1901, for the Chicago White Stockings

Last MLB appearance
- October 3, 1909, for the St. Louis Browns

MLB statistics
- Batting average: .213
- Home runs: 0
- Runs batted in: 12
- Stats at Baseball Reference

Teams
- Chicago White Stockings (1901); St. Louis Browns (1909)

John James McAleese (August 22, 1878 – November 15, 1950) was an American Major League Baseball pitcher during the early 1900s. He also played for, and managed teams in, in the minor leagues.

== Formative years and family ==
Born in Sharon, Pennsylvania on August 22, 1878, McAleese was a son of Patrick McAleese (1846-1884) and Catherine (Diamond) McAleese (1849-1933). His brother, Daniel McAleese, played baseball for the Sharon Independent club in 1903 and for the Wellsville, New York team in 1904.

== Career ==
McAleese began his career as a pitcher, and appeared in one game with the Chicago White Stockings in 1901 as a reliever. He pitched three innings, giving up seven hits and three runs. He then went to the minor leagues, where he was converted into a full-time outfielder by 1904. After pitching in Rochester, New York for several years, he left that team when it disbanded in 1903, and headed for Baltimore, Maryland, where he pitched and played first base. Released by his Baltimore Eastern League team in May 1904, following a pay dispute, he was signed by the Binghamton, New York team later that same month.

He did not return to the majors until 1909, when he served as the primary reserve outfielder for the St. Louis Browns. After batting just .213 in 85 games, he returned to the minors for a few years, retiring after the 1912 season.

In 1913, he became the manager of a baseball club in Greenville, Pennsylvania. In 1914, McAleese purchased a hotel in Youngstown, Ohio, where he had previously played baseball prior to managing the club in Greenville. That same year, he also worked as a scout for the Federals league.

== Illness, death and interment ==
A resident of New York from the early 1940s through mid-November 1950, McAleese was ill for the final month of his life. He died at the age of seventy-two at St. Luke's Hospital in New York City on November 14, 1950. His remains were returned to his hometown of Sharon, where funeral services were held at the Reinsel Funeral Home. He was buried at Saint Mary's Cemetery in Hermitage, Pennsylvania.
