= Billy Milligan (baseball) =

American baseball player (1878-1928)

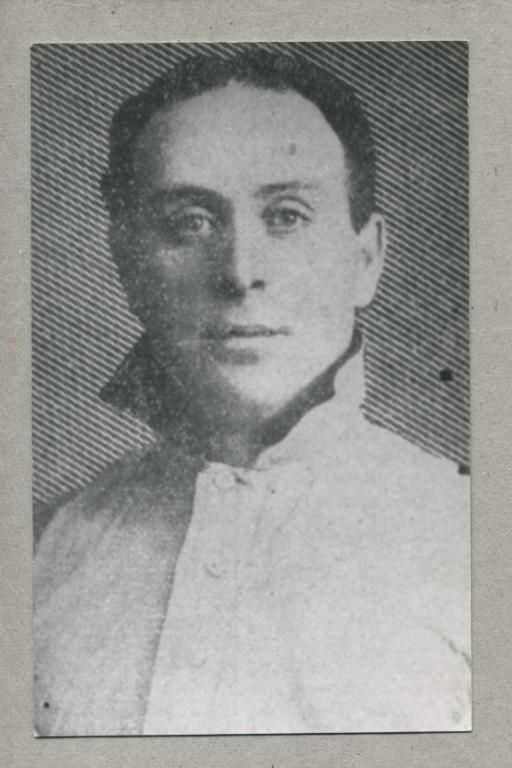
- Pitcher
- Born: August 19, 1878; Buffalo, New York, U.S.
- Died: October 14, 1928 (aged 50); Buffalo, New York, U.S.
- Batted: Right Threw: Left

MLB debut
- April 30, 1901, for the Philadelphia Athletics

Last MLB appearance
- May 15, 1904, for the New York Giants

MLB statistics
- Win–loss record: 0–4
- Strikeouts: 11
- Earned run average: 4.81
- Stats at Baseball Reference

Teams
- Philadelphia Athletics (1901); New York Giants (1904)

William Joseph Milligan (August 19, 1878 – October 14, 1928) was an American Major League Baseball pitcher. He played for the Philadelphia Athletics during the 1901 season and the New York Giants during the 1904 season.
