= Ed Cermak =

American baseball player (1881-1911)

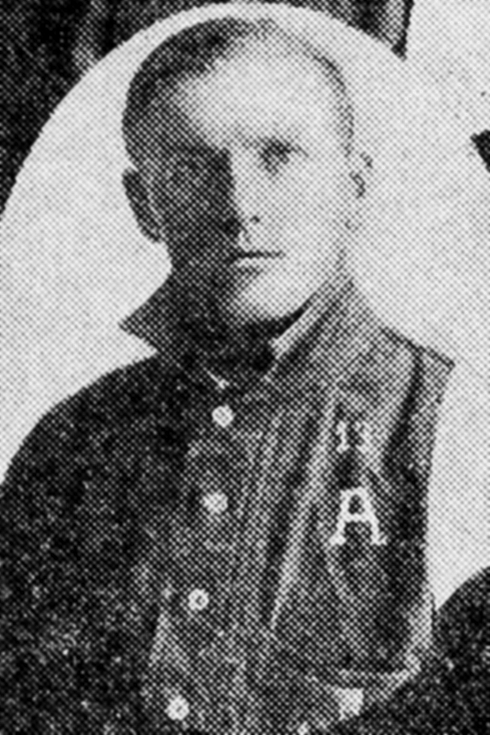
- Right fielder
- Born: July 23, 1881; Cleveland, Ohio, U.S.
- Died: November 22, 1911 (aged 30); Cleveland, Ohio, U.S.
- Batted: Right Threw: Right

MLB debut
- September 9, 1901, for the Cleveland Blues

Last MLB appearance
- September 9, 1901, for the Cleveland Blues

MLB statistics
- Batting average: .000
- At bats: 4
- Strikeouts: 4
- Stats at Baseball Reference

Teams
- Cleveland Blues (1901)

Edward Hugo Cermak (July 23, 1881 – November 22, 1911) was an American professional baseball player. He played in one game in Major League Baseball for the Cleveland Blues on September 9, 1901. Starting the game in right field, he had four plate appearances and struck out in all four.

Cermak became an umpire after his playing days and was apparently struck in the throat by a foul ball at some point during the 1911 season, losing his speaking ability. When Cermak died late that year, the newspaper in his hometown reported that his death was related to the on-field injury. However, authors Robert Gorman and David Weeks write that Cermak died of tuberculosis and that the throat injury was not listed as a contributing factor on Cermak's death certificate.

He was buried at Woodland Cemetery in Cleveland.
