= Thomas Dickson (industrialist) =

American businessman

Thomas Dickson (1824 – July 31, 1884) was an English-American industrialist who manufactured steam engines, boilers and locomotives, and was the President of the Delaware and Hudson Railroad.

== Early life ==
Thomas Dickson was born in Leeds, England in 1824, and died in Morristown, New Jersey.

Dickson and his family immigrated to Nova Scotia in 1835. In 1836, Dickson's family moved to Carbondale, Pennsylvania, where he worked as a mule driver for the Delaware and Hudson Railroad.

== Early career ==
In 1855, Thomas Dickson joined his brothers John and George and friends Maurice and Charles Wurts, and opened a small machine shop and foundry under the name of "Dickson & Co". In 1856, George Scranton persuaded the company to relocate to the newly incorporated Scranton, Pennsylvania. In 1862, The company incorporated as the Dickson Manufacturing Company, which became known for its steam locomotives the company built from its Scranton facility. Thomas was president from 1856 though 1867.

== Later life ==
In 1859, Dickson was appointed the superintendent of coal for the Delaware and Hudson Canal Company. He quickly rose through the ranks and in 1869, Dickson resigned from the Dickson Manufacturing Company and became president of the Delaware and Hudson Railroad. He remained in the position until his death in 1884.

Dickson was listed as the director for at least 24 companies during his life. He also established an iron plant on the shores of Lake Champlain.

The borough of Dickson City, Pennsylvania, is named after Thomas Dickson.

Business positions
| Preceded by George Talbot Olyphant | President of Delaware | Succeeded by Robert M. Olyphant |
