= John McPherson (baseball) =

American baseball player (1869-1941)

- Pitcher
- Born: March 9, 1869; Easton, Pennsylvania, U.S.
- Died: September 30, 1941 (aged 72); Easton, Pennsylvania, U.S.
- Batted: Unknown Threw: Right

MLB debut
- July 12, 1901, for the Philadelphia Athletics

Last MLB appearance
- July 10, 1904, for the Philadelphia Phillies

MLB statistics
- Win–loss record: 1–13
- Earned run average: 3.89
- Stats at Baseball Reference

Teams
- Philadelphia Athletics (1901); Philadelphia Phillies (1904)

John Jacob McPherson (March 9, 1869 – September 30, 1941) was an American Major League Baseball pitcher. He played for the Philadelphia Athletics during the 1901 season and the Philadelphia Phillies during the 1904 season. He holds the all-time major league record for most career losses by a pitcher (13) whose only major league win was a shutout. McPherson also became the first player to have at least 50 plate appearances (51) in a career without scoring a run.
