= Herm McFarland =

American baseball player (1870–1935)

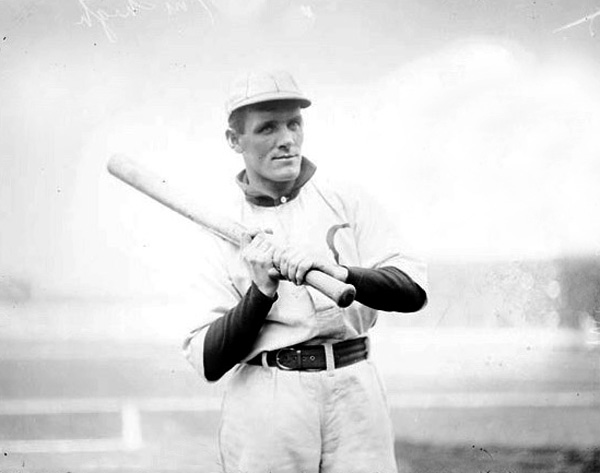
- Outfielder
- Born: March 11, 1870; Des Moines, Iowa, U.S.
- Died: September 21, 1935 (aged 65); Richmond, Virginia, U.S.
- Batted: Left Threw: Right

MLB debut
- April 21, 1896, for the Louisville Colonels

Last MLB appearance
- September 29, 1903, for the New York Highlanders

MLB statistics
- Batting average: .266
- Home runs: 13
- Hits: 340
- Runs batted in: 167
- Stats at Baseball Reference

Teams
- Louisville Colonels (1896); Cincinnati Reds (1898); Chicago White Sox (1901–1902); Baltimore Orioles (1902); New York Highlanders (1903)

Hermas Walter McFarland (March 11, 1870 – September 21, 1935) was an American professional baseball player. He played all or part of five seasons in Major League Baseball for the Louisville Colonels (1896), Cincinnati Reds (1898), Chicago White Sox (1901–02) and Baltimore Orioles/New York Highlanders (1902–03), primarily as an outfielder.

Born in Des Moines, Iowa, McFarland was a member of the White Sox team that won the 1901 American League pennant. In 5 seasons he played in 352 games and had 1,278 at bats, 204 runs, 340 hits, 61 doubles, 28 triples, 13 home runs, 167 RBI, 64 stolen bases, 175 walks, .266 batting average, .362 on-base percentage, .388 slugging percentage, 496 total bases and 26 sacrifice hits.

He died in Richmond, Virginia at the age of 65.

== Sources ==
- Career statistics from ESPN · Baseball Reference · Baseball Reference (Minors) · Retrosheet · Baseball Almanac
