= Bob McKinney =

American baseball player (1875-1946)

- Second baseman/Third baseman
- Born: October 4, 1875; McSherrystown, Pennsylvania, U.S.
- Died: August 19, 1946 (aged 70); Chicago, Illinois, U.S.
- Batted: Right Threw: Right

MLB debut
- July 23, 1901, for the Philadelphia Athletics

Last MLB appearance
- August 2, 1901, for the Philadelphia Athletics

MLB statistics
- Batting average: .000
- Home runs: 0
- Runs batted in: 0
- Stats at Baseball Reference

Teams
- Philadelphia Athletics (1901)

Robert Francis McKinney (October 4, 1875 – August 19, 1946) was an American Major League Baseball infielder. He played for the Philadelphia Athletics during the 1901 season.
