= Pete Loos =

American baseball player (1878-1956)

- Pitcher
- Born: March 23, 1878; Philadelphia, Pennsylvania, U.S.
- Died: February 23, 1956 (aged 77); Darby, Pennsylvania, U.S.
- Batted: Unknown Threw: Right

MLB debut
- May 2, 1901, for the Philadelphia Athletics

Last MLB appearance
- May 2, 1901, for the Philadelphia Athletics

MLB statistics
- Win–loss record: 0–1
- Earned run average: 27.00
- Stats at Baseball Reference

Teams
- Philadelphia Athletics (1901)

Ivan Loos (March 23, 1878 – February 23, 1956) was a 5'6 American Major League Baseball pitcher, who had a right hand throw. He played for the Philadelphia Athletics during the 1901 season.
