= Bob Lindemann =

American baseball player (1881-1951)

- Outfielder
- Born: June 5, 1881; Philadelphia
- Died: December 19, 1951 (aged 70); Williamsport, Pennsylvania
- Batted: Switch Threw: Right

MLB debut
- August 28, 1901, for the Philadelphia Athletics

Last MLB appearance
- August 31, 1901, for the Philadelphia Athletics

MLB statistics
- Batting average: .111
- Home runs: 0
- Runs batted in: 0
- Stats at Baseball Reference

Teams
- Philadelphia Athletics (1901)

John Frederick Mann Lindemann (June 5, 1881 – December 19, 1951) was an American Major League Baseball outfielder. He played for the Philadelphia Athletics during the 1901 season.
