= Jack Bracken (baseball) =

American baseball player (1881–1954)

- Pitcher
- Born: April 14, 1881; Cleveland, Ohio, U.S.
- Died: July 16, 1954 (aged 73); Highland Park, Michigan, U.S.
- Batted: Right Threw: Right

MLB debut
- August 7, 1901, for the Cleveland Blues

Last MLB appearance
- September 27, 1901, for the Cleveland Blues

MLB statistics
- Win–loss record: 4–8
- Earned run average: 6.21
- Strikeouts: 18
- Stats at Baseball Reference

Teams
- Cleveland Blues (1901)

John James Bracken (April 14, 1881 – July 16, 1954) was an American Major League Baseball pitcher who played for one season. He played for the Cleveland Blues from August 7, 1901, to September 27, 1901.

On the 15th of September, Bracken gave up 24 hits in 7.5 innings as the Detroit Tigers defeated the Blues 21–0, the most lopsided victory in American League history up to that time.
