= Bock Baker =

American baseball player (1878-1940)

- Pitcher
- Born: July 17, 1878; Troy, New York, U.S.
- Died: August 17, 1940 (aged 62); New York City, New York, U.S.
- Batted: Unknown Threw: Left

MLB debut
- April 28, 1901, for the Cleveland Blues

Last MLB appearance
- May 13, 1901, for the Philadelphia Athletics

MLB statistics
- Win–loss record: 0–2
- Earned run average: 7.71
- Strikeouts: 1
- Stats at Baseball Reference

Teams
- Cleveland Blues (1901); Philadelphia Athletics (1901)

Charles "Bock" Baker (July 17, 1878 – August 17, 1940) was an American Major League Baseball pitcher who played for the Cleveland Blues for one game in 1901, and the Philadelphia Athletics for one game in 1901. His debut for the Blues was memorable for the wrong reason – Baker gave up 23 singles in a 10-1 loss to the Chicago White Sox, an American League record that still stands for the most singles surrendered by a pitcher in a game.
