= Thomas Stuart Chalmers =

American businessman (1816-1903)

- Born: 1816; Dronley, Scotland
- Died: 1903 (aged 86–87); Chicago, Illinois
- Occupation: Businessmanm
- Known for: Founding Fraser & Chalmers, a precursor to Allis-Chalmers
- Spouse: Janet Telfer (married in 1840)
- Children: 1 (William James Chalmers)

Thomas Stuart Chalmers (June 1816 – July 13, 1903) was an American businessman. A pioneer of Chicago industry, he founded Fraser & Chalmers, a precursor to Allis-Chalmers (now part of AGCO).

== Life ==
Chalmers was born in Dronley, Scotland, in June 1816. He emigrated to the United States around 1842 or 1843.

In 1872, Chalmers founded Fraser & Chalmers in Chicago. By 1880, the company employed over 170 workers. Frasers & Chalmers produced mining machinery, boilers, and pumps, becoming one of the largest mining manufacturing companies in the world by 1890.

Chalmers was the father-in-law of Joan Pinkerton Chalmers, daughter of Allan Pinkerton and wife to his son William J. Chalmers.

Chalmers died at his home at 179 Ashland Boulevard in Chicago on June 28, 1903. The cause of death was bronchitis. Following his death, his estate worth $300,000 was divided among his widow and their children. His son William J. Chalmers was the primary heir and succeeded his father as the head of Allis-Chalmers.

== Legacy ==
The Chalmers School of Excellence in Chicago is named in honor of Thomas Chalmers.

Chalmers' son William served as President of Allis-Chalmers.

== See also ==
- Allis-Chalmers
