= John Skopec =

American baseball player (1880–1912)

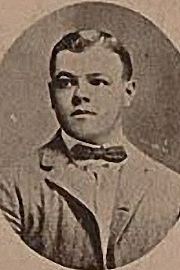
- Pitcher
- Born: May 8, 1880; Chicago, Illinois, U.S.
- Died: October 20, 1912 (aged 32); Chicago, Illinois, U.S.
- Batted: Right Threw: Left

MLB debut
- April 25, 1901, for the Chicago White Sox

Last MLB appearance
- September 11, 1903, for the Detroit Tigers

MLB statistics
- Win–loss record: 8–5
- Earned run average: 3.26
- Strikeouts: 38
- Stats at Baseball Reference

Teams
- Chicago White Sox (1901); Detroit Tigers (1903)

John S. Skopec (May 8, 1880 – October 20, 1912) was an American pitcher in Major League Baseball from 1901 to 1903. He played for the Chicago White Sox and Detroit Tigers.

== Biography ==
John Skopec was born in Chicago. He was a left-handed pitcher. In 1900, he joined the Chicago White Sox as a pitcher under Charles Comiskey's management. He then joined the Detroit Tigers. In 1904, he sprained his arm and left Detroit.

Skopec also played with the Wheeling Stogies, Little Rock Travelers and the Colorado Springs Millionaires. He joined the Newark Sailors on February 25, 1905.

Skopec died in October 1912.
