= Dick Braggins =

American baseball player (1879-1963)

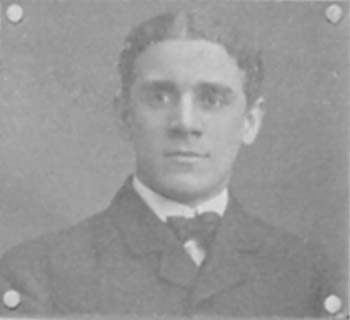
- Pitcher
- Born: December 25, 1879; Mercer, Pennsylvania, U.S.
- Died: August 16, 1963 (aged 83); Lake Wales, Florida, U.S.
- Batted: Right Threw: Right

MLB debut
- May 16, 1901, for the Cleveland Blues

Last MLB appearance
- June 26, 1901, for the Cleveland Blues

MLB statistics
- Win–loss record: 1–2
- Earned run average: 4.78
- Strikeouts: 1
- Stats at Baseball Reference

Teams
- Cleveland Blues (1901)

Richard Realf Braggins (December 25, 1879 – August 16, 1963) was an American baseball player who pitched in only four games over the course of about six weeks for the 1901 Cleveland Blues. In 32 innings he gave up 17 runs on 44 hits, struck out 1 and walked 15. He attended Case School of Applied Science (now Case Western Reserve University) from 1898 to 1901 where he was a member of the baseball and track teams. Braggins, while also a player, was manager of the Case baseball team from 1899 to 1901.

He played for the minor league team Cleveland Lake Shores in 1900 where he had an ERA of 0 allowed 86 hits and 41 walks in 10 games. He had 8 hits batting. He also played two games as a right fielder. In 1901 he played for the Troy Trojans in the New York State League

Braggins was a member of Phi Delta Theta fraternity.
