= April 1901 =

Month in 1901

<<	April 1901					>>
Su	Mo	Tu	We	Th	Fr	Sa
	1	2	3	4	5	6
7	8	9	10	11	12	13
14	15	16	17	18	19	20
21	22	23	24	25	26	27
28	29	30

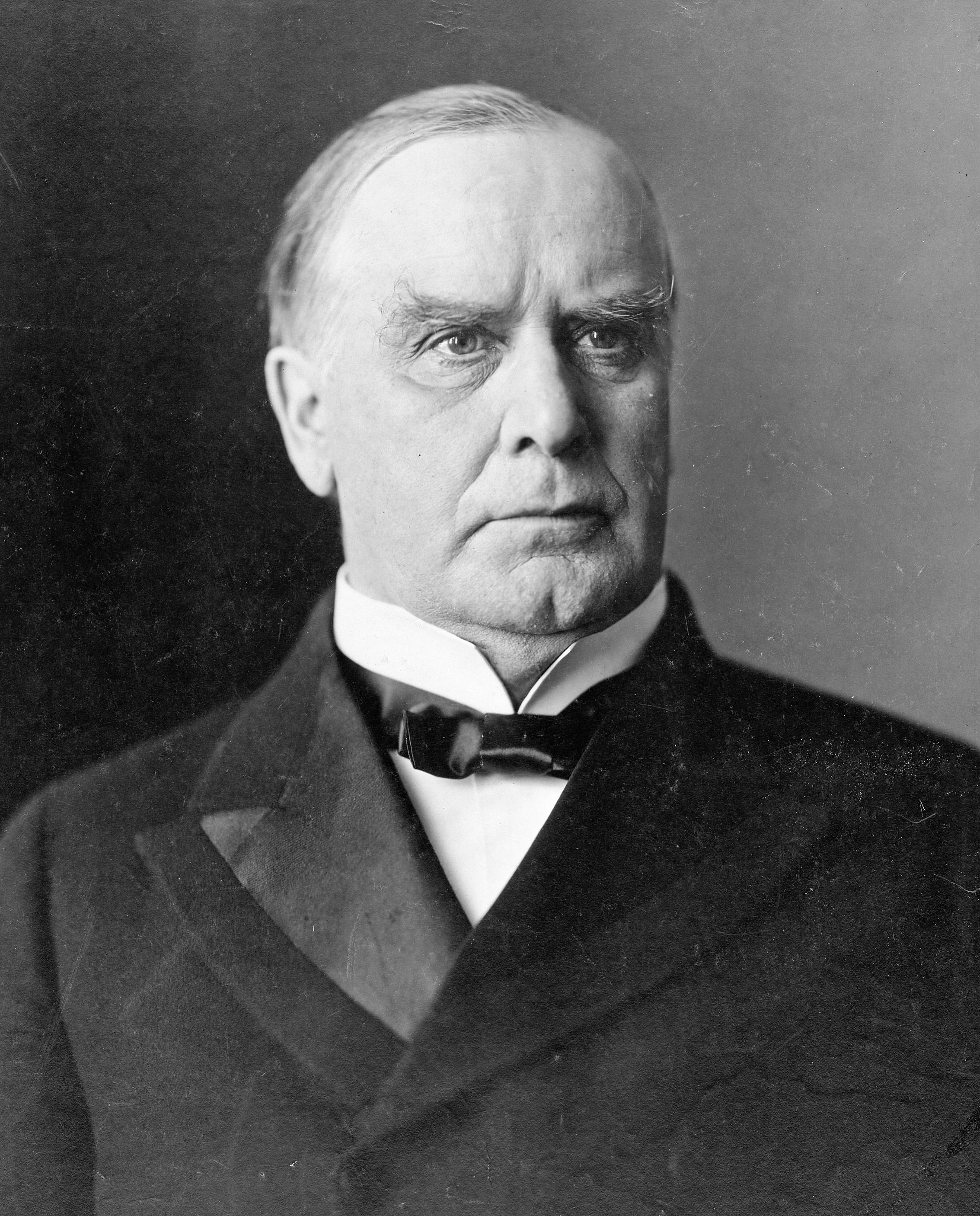
April 29, 1901: President McKinley departs on nationwide U.S. tour

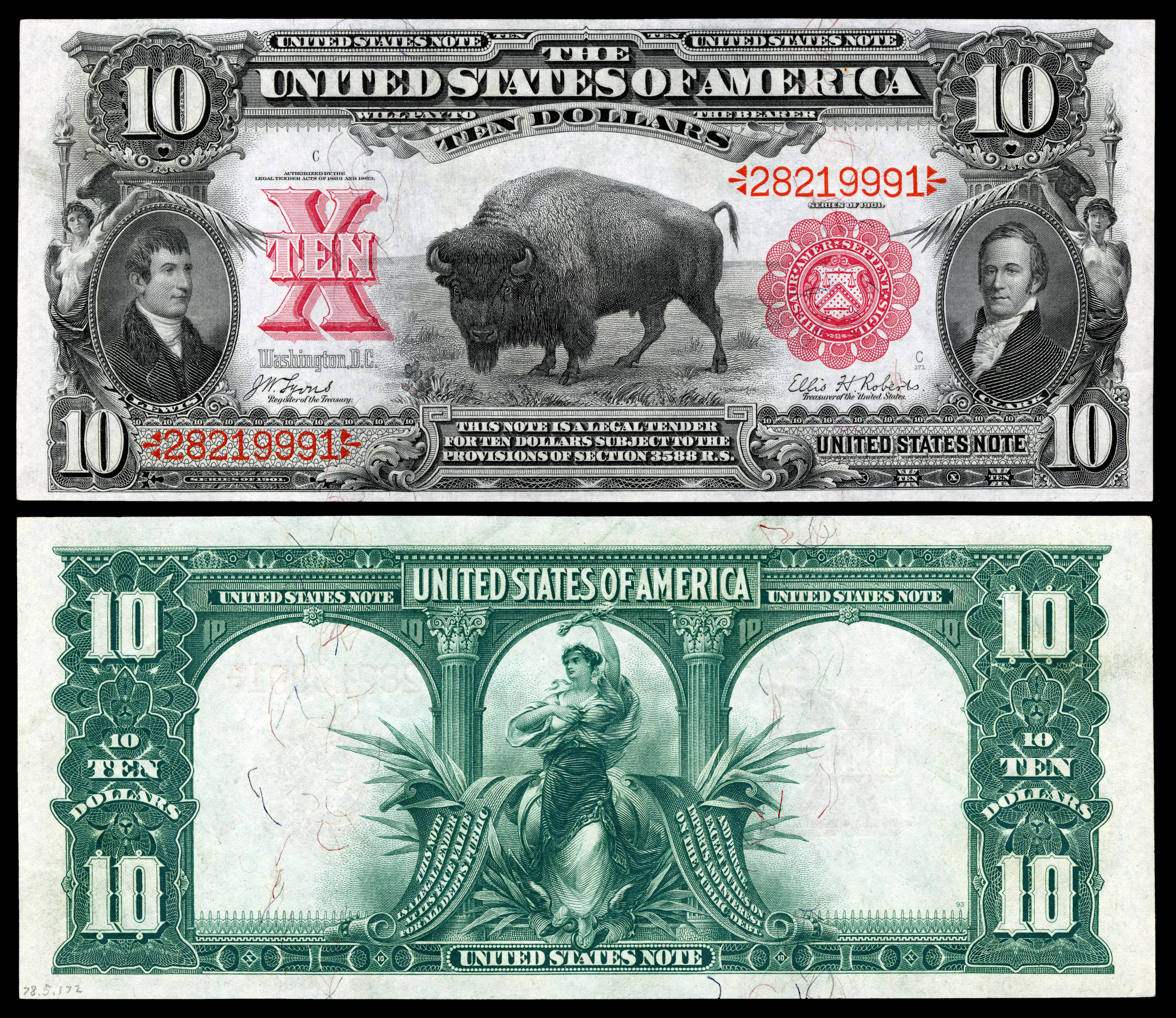
April 9, 1901: New U.S. $10 bill approved by Treasury Department

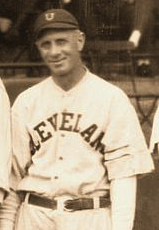
April 24, 1901: Ollie Pickering first to bat in the first ever American League game

The following events occurred in April 1901:

== April 1, 1901 (Monday) ==
- Emilio Aguinaldo, formerly the president of the Philippine Republic, signed an oath of allegiance to the United States, nine days after his capture, in return for his release from incarceration. The pledge took place at the Malacañang Palace in Manila, at the office of the Military Governor, U.S. Army General Arthur MacArthur Jr.
- The 1901 United Kingdom census was taken of all persons alive in the United Kingdom of Great Britain and Ireland at the beginning of that day, defined as those "returned as living at midnight on Sunday, March 31st". The total population of the England and Wales, Scotland, and Ireland (including Northern Ireland and what is now the Republic of Ireland) was reported as 41,458,721, broken down as England and Wales (32,527,843); Scotland (4,472,103) and Ireland (4,547,775).
- Thirty thousand iron workers in Scotland walked off of the job in a strike seeking a guaranteed maximum eight-hour day.
- Sir Frederick Lugard, the British Governor of Northern Nigeria, issued the Slavery Proclamation, outlawing the future purchase or sale of slaves, and prohibiting the return of a runaway slave to his master. However, the decree did not grant freedom to people who were enslaved, other than those persons born after April 1, 1901, and women who were concubines of a master could continue to be traded. Slavery would continue to be legal within the Kano State of Northern Nigeria until 1926, and the institution would continue to exist in the absence of enforcement of the proclamation.
- General Leonard Wood, the American military governor of Cuba, refused to certify the selection of Alfredo Zayas y Alfonso as the Mayor of Havana. The Havana city council had voted 12–10 for his appointment.
- The United States Steel Corporation, which had been founded on February 25, began operations.
- Mrs. Elizabeth Moore was arrested by police in Baltimore after attending a professional boxing match. Mrs. Moore wanted to see lightweight boxer and future champion Joe Gans in the ring, despite a societal taboo against women joining the all-male audiences that were allowed to watch the bouts. She purchased third row seats after disguising herself as a man, and was arrested by the police captain on the premises and charged with violating a state law against "masquerading in male attire", released only after her husband posted a $105 bond. She was fined $20 and costs for the infraction.
- Born: Whittaker Chambers, American, activist, member of Communist Party USA and editor of the Daily Worker magazine before he testified in the perjury trial of Alger Hiss; in Philadelphia (d. 1961)

== April 2, 1901 (Tuesday) ==
- The United Kingdom enacted a law establishing the military court system, with jurisdiction over acts committed by the Boer guerrillas within South Africa during the Second Boer War. Unlike the Special Court that had previously handled serious crimes committed by rebels in British-controlled areas, the military courts, which began hearing cases on April 12, had "unlimited powers of decision and the authority to pass the death sentence". Executions, usually done in public to set an example for would-be rebels, were carried out by hanging or by firing squad.
- The Victoria League for Commonwealth Friendship, a charitable service organization that currently provides assistance to persons within the British Commonwealth, was founded in London by Lady Violet Cecil. Its original vision was "patriotism, belief in racial hierarchy, respect for the monarchy, Christianity and the armed services, and admiration for the past and present British heroes who exemplified those values".
- The London County Council voted to purchase 225 acres of land in Tottenham, at the cost of $7,500,000, to create cottages to accommodate workingmen's family housing sufficient for 42,000 people.
- Born: Patrick Buchan-Hepburn, British state leader, first and only Governor-General of the West Indies Federation (d. 1974)
- Died: Will Carver, 32, American outlaw, in a shootout with Sheriff Elijah Briant in Sonora, Texas (b. 1868)

== April 3, 1901 (Wednesday) ==
- The first elections in Denmark to use a secret ballot took place for the Folketing, the lower house of the Danish Parliament, and left the ruling Højre party with only 8 of the 114 seats, while increasing the lead of the Venstre Reform party to 76 seats. Under Denmark's political system at the time, the King appointed the konseilspræsident (Council President, equivalent to the Prime Minister) who selected his cabinet, regardless of who controlled the Folketing. While outnumbered 106–8 by the three liberal parties, the conservative Højre party had 42 of the 66 seats in the upper house of the Rigsdagen, the Landstinget that was selected by electors. Because of the overwhelming defeat of the conservatives in the popular elections, King Christian would accede to demands that the government led by Hannibal Sehested should resign, and would appoint J. H. Deuntzer as the new premier.
- Died: Richard D'Oyly Carte, 56, English impresario (b. 1844)

== April 4, 1901 (Thursday) ==
- Mankulumana, chief adviser to Dinuzulu, king of the Zulu nation, led newly armed Zulu troops to assist the British Army in an attack against the Boers in the Vryheid district of the South African Republic. The Zulu force was accompanied by Dinuzulu and Colonel Herbert Bottomley of the British Army's Imperial Light Horse Regiment.
- The circus Sarrasani was founded in Germany in Radebeul by Hans Stosch-Sarrasani. Internationally famous prior to World War II, the German circus traveled the world. After its permanent theater was destroyed in the Dresden bombing, the circus would be reorganized in Argentina, by Stosch-Sarrasani's widow, as the Circo Nacional Argentino, and operate until 1972.
- Born: George Moorhouse, English-born American soccer player and captain of the 1934 United States men's national soccer team who became the first native of England to appear in a FIFA World Cup tournament game; in Liverpool (d. 1943). Moorhouse, a left back for the New York Giants soccer team of the American Soccer League was one of six natives of the United Kingdom to appear for the U.S. team at the inaugural World Cup in 1930, a competition which did not include England. The other five British players were from Scotland.
- Died: George T. Anderson, 77, American army officer, commander of the 11th Georgia Infantry Regiment during the American Civil War, police chief of Atlanta (b. 1824)

== April 5, 1901 (Friday) ==
- The Allegheny College basketball team, with a 6–1 record against other colleges, and 13–2 overall, met the Yale University team, which was 5–0 against colleges after bouncing back from a string of losses against non-college teams, in a game at Meadville, Pennsylvania. In what the local paper described the next day as "the greatest victory in her basket ball career", Allegheny defeated Yale, 21 to 12, in what was "a fast, well-played game" under the rules at that time. "The result of this game establishes Allegheny as equal to, if not better, than any other college team in the country," the Pittsburgh Post noted the next day. Nevertheless, the Helms Athletic Foundation would, in 1957, retroactively declare that Yale had been the best team of 1901.
- Philander C. Knox was named as the new United States Attorney General after being appointed to succeed John W. Griggs. He would be confirmed by the United States Senate and took office four days after his appointment.
- Born:
  - Hattie Alexander, American pediatrician and microbiologist who developed the first effective remedy for illnesses caused by the bacterium Haemophilus influenzae (Hib), diseases that had a high fatality rate among infants and young children; in Baltimore (d. 1968)
  - Chester Bowles, American diplomat and politician, 22nd United States Under Secretary of State in the Kennedy administration before being removed for opposing further U.S. involvement in South Vietnam and Laos, 78th Governor of Connecticut; in Springfield, Massachusetts (d. 1986)
  - Subbayya Sivasankaranarayana Pillai, Indian mathematician; in Nagercoil, Madras Province (now Tamil Nadu state), British India (d. 1950, killed in plane crash)

== April 6, 1901 (Saturday) ==
- The wreckage of the U.S. Navy collier Merrimac, which had been blocking the entrance to the harbor of Santiago de Cuba, was successfully destroyed and removed. The ship had been deliberately sunk on July 2, 1898, during the Spanish–American War to block the Spanish fleet of Admiral Pascual Cervera y Topete from leaving the harbor.
- The painting Portrait of Georgiana, Duchess of Devonshire, painted by Thomas Gainsborough, returned to England 25 years after it was stolen, as the steamer Etruria docked at Southampton with C. Moreland Agnew on board. With the help of detective William A. Pinkerton, Agnew had recovered the painting in Chicago on March 27.
- The New York Wanderers won the U.S. professional basketball championship, finishing in first place in the seven-team National Basket Ball League in their final game, a 36 to 21 win at Millville, New Jersey, against the Millville Glassblowers.
- Born:
  - Pier Giorgio Frassati, Italian religious and social activist, beatified by the Catholic Church in 1990; in Turin (d. 1925, of polio)
  - Yong-do Lee, Korean religious and social activist who broke with the Korean Presbyterian Church after attempting to reform it (d. 1932 of tuberculosis)
- Died:
  - George M. Smith, 77, British publisher, creator of the Dictionary of National Biography, and the literary journal The Cornhill Magazine (b. 1824)
  - George Wellesley, 86, British naval officer, 54th First Sea Lord of the Royal Navy (b. 1814)

== April 7, 1901 (Sunday) ==
- Theatrical producer David Belasco, who owned the rights to the stage play Madame Butterfly: A Tragedy of Japan, finalized an agreement with Giacomo Puccini, authorizing the composer to adapt the plot to what would become an oft-performed Italian language opera, Madama Butterfly, with a premiere in 1904.
- Émile Loubet, President of France, officiated at the opening of the lavish Gare de Lyon restaurant of the Paris station of the Chemins de fer de Paris à Lyon et à la Méditerranée (PLM) Railway. The new establishment was as much of a museum as it was a restaurant, with 41 original paintings and "scores of life-sized statutes and reliefs", all celebrating travel by train.
- Born: Andre Trocme, French missionary; in Saint-Quentin-en-Tourmont (d. 1971). He and his wife, Magda, would be recognized with the Righteous Among the Nations honor by Israel for their role in saving Jews from extermination during The Holocaust.
- Died:
  - Josephine Louise Newcomb, 84, American philanthropist, founder of H. Sophie Newcomb Memorial College as a women's college to supplement the all-male Tulane University in New Orleans (b. 1816)
  - Eden Upton Eddis, 88, British portrait artist (b. 1812)
  - Buz Luckey, 31, American train robber in the Nathaniel Reed gang. at the federal prison in Columbus, Ohio

== April 8, 1901 (Monday) ==
- James Chalmers, 59, and Oliver Fellows Tomkins, 28, both Scottish missionaries, went ashore on Goaribari Island in New Guinea with eleven Papuan assistants. After arriving, they were invited by islanders to come into a longhouse, where they were clubbed to death, then eaten, by cannibals. In retaliation, British colonial officials dispatched troops from Port Moresby, Papua New Guinea who killed at least 24 of the tribesmen, then burned the longhouses in the village. In 1903, an expedition would be sent to search for Tomkins's skull, and more villagers would be killed.
- U.S. President William McKinley and Surgeon General Dr. Walter Wyman began federal aid to eliminate an outbreak of bubonic plague in San Francisco, and to see to it "that Chinatown was scrubbed clean"; earlier, the city's Board of Health had proposed a plan to demolish the Chinese-American area of the city and to remove all Chinese residents in the city to detention camps on Angel Island.
- The British colonial authorities at the Cape Colony announced that beginning on April 12, any new rebellion would be tried under the old common law, and the death penalty applied as necessary.

== April 9, 1901 (Tuesday) ==
- The United States Department of the Navy established its first foreign base, a coaling station in Mexico at Pichilinque. The U.S. Navy collier USS Alexander was ordered to ship 5,000 tons of coal from the Atlantic Ocean port of Baltimore to the Pacific Ocean base in Mexico.
- Lyman J. Gage, the United States Secretary of the Treasury, approved the first change for the American ten-dollar bill in more than 20 years. The front of the new bill, to be put into circulation later in the year, featured a picture of an American buffalo in the center, and explorers Meriwether Lewis and William Clark on left and right side respectively.
- Born: Howard A. Rusk, American physician, founder of the practice of rehabilitation medicine, with the creation in 1948 of the Rusk Institute of Rehabilitation Medicine; in Brookfield, Missouri (d. 1989)

== April 10, 1901 (Wednesday) ==
- General Louis Botha renewed peace negotiations between the South African Republic and the United Kingdom.
- Cipriano Castro, President of Venezuela since 1899, began a new term in office following election.
- The city of Brookport, Illinois, was created by the merger of the railroad town of Brooklyn and the unincorporated area of Pellonia.

== April 11, 1901 (Thursday) ==
- Martín Teófilo Delgado, who had formerly been a leader of the Filipino insurgency until he had sworn allegiance to the United States, was appointed the Governor of Iloilo Province.
- The African-American songwriting and performing team of Bob Cole and Billy Johnson filed for bankruptcy during the fourth season of their musical, A Trip to Coontown. The closing of the show and the bankruptcy caused Cole to part ways with his partner, and "Bob Cole's fame and prestige only increased, while Billy Johnson settled into a less conspicuous career in mainstream vaudeville."
- Born:
  - Adriano Olivetti, Italian engineer, designer of the Olivetti typewriters and computers, in Ivrea (d. 1960)
  - Carl Alberg, Swedish yacht designer, in Gothenburg (d. 1986)
  - Glenway Wescott, American novelist, nonfiction author and poet, in Kewaskum, Wisconsin (d. 1987)

== April 12, 1901 (Friday) ==
- The United States proposed to the other foreign powers in China that the Chinese indemnity for damages from the Boxer Rebellion be cut by one-half.
- Cuba's constitutional convention voted, 18–10, to oppose the terms of the Platt Amendment for the islands independence from the United States.
- The American Institute of Electrical Engineers held what it called a "Conversazione" at Columbia University in New York, "an exhibition of various electrical appliances that had been recently invented, or the models of which had been improved of late", demonstrating 32 different experiments to 400 guests, including Thomas Edison. Nikola Tesla, the most prominent of the group, transmitted wave vibrations from an electric oscillator "which were to be discharged in various parts of the room". In another experiment by Tesla, "Sparks leaped six feet in all directions" from a "huge flat coil ten feet high... in the front of the room". Peter Cooper Hewitt explained his newly invented mercury-vapor lamp, where "a gas is used as the illuminating medium instead of a film ... current is transmitted to the mercury direct, and not by means of the usual coil, for which reason less power is needed to produce the same amount of light." The New York Times noted what Hewitt noted was "a disadvantage" that needed to be worked on, in that "A most peculiar colored light is emitted from the tubes. It is half purple, half green," and that "everybody who came into the room had his or her features so distorted that the skin of the face appeared to be covered all over with ghastly, violet-colored eruptions ... The lips that came under the light seemed purplish gray. The pupils of the eye ... assumed a greenish tinge." In showing his newly patented "facsimile picture telegraph", Herbert R. Palmer explained how "halftone pictures, sketches, handwriting, and the like can be transmitted over long distances, employing ordinary telegraph circuits", then sent "a life-sized portrait of President William Rainey Harper of the University of Chicago" over the wires to Chicago, by a forerunner of the fax machine, to the Quadrangle Club. At the same time, Harper began receiving "a similar picture of Seth Low" (Columbia's president) that had been sent from Chicago to New York City. M. R. Hutchinson demonstrated the "akouphone", which he "described as a microtelephonic instrument ... to reproduce and largely intensify sounds and still preserve their quality", transmitted to the "akoulalion", a set of ear pieces, "intended to make the deaf hear". An administrator "of the New York Institute of the Deaf and Dumb brought eight of the deafest boys in the institution" to try the new system "with only partial success".
- The Great Comet of 1901, visible from the Southern Hemisphere, was first observed by an astronomer with the surname Viscara, at an observatory near Paysandú, Uruguay.
- Born: Leo Ginzburg, Polish-Russian conductor and pianist, in Warsaw (d. 1979)
- Died: George Q. Cannon, 74, First Counselor in the First Presidency in the Church of Jesus Christ of Latter-day Saints (LDS Church) for four Presidents, starting in 1873 when selected by Brigham Young; also a Church Apostle since 1860 and a member of the Quorum of the Twelve Apostles on three occasions (b. 1827)

== April 13, 1901 (Saturday) ==
- Angered over the aggressive efforts of the Capuchin missionaries in attempting to dismantle their villages and move their children to the mission at Alto Alegre do Maranhão, the Guajajara Indians of Brazil began "the rebellion of Alto Alegre". Led by João Caboré, known as Kawiré Iman, the Guajajara attacked the mission and massacred the Christian friars. During the insurrection, hundreds of people would die, most of them Guajajaras killed in expeditions by the Brazilian Army.
- Born:
  - Jacques Lacan, French psychoanalyst and psychiatrist; in Paris (d. 1981)
  - Zhao Shiyan, Chinese communist activist; in Youyang, Sichuan (d. 1927, executed)
  - Georgy I. Pokrovsky, Soviet physicist, inventor and author, and pioneer in geotechnical centrifuge modeling (d. 1979)

== April 14, 1901 (Sunday) ==
- Cen Chunxuan, a British-educated Chinese official who would later lead a rebellion against the central government of China, became the new Governor of the Shanxi Province and began implementing major reforms.
- The Imperial government of China signed a contract with Japan to set up a police academy in Beijing.
- The government of Korea passed a law applying the death penalty for anyone convicted of the smoking of opium.
- Anti-government protests continued throughout the Russian Empire, and 1,500 demonstrators were arrested during a demonstration in the Ukrainian city of Odessa.
- The state of South Carolina declared that it would stop paying the federal tax on liquor, on the ground that as the sole authorized wholesale and retail seller of liquor in the state, its exercise of its sovereign power rendered it immune to regulation by the United States. The U.S. soon filed suit, and the U.S. Supreme Court would reject the state's argument in a 6–3 decision in South Carolina v. United States in 1905.
- The Texas Fuel Company began the practice of uncapping an oil well for members of the general public, as a means of impressing prospective investors. Passengers from 26 train coaches were treated to a demonstration where a well was "opened up and permitted to flow a 6-inch stream of oil 120 feet into the air", then closed after a few minutes. The exhibition was impressive, but also "fraught with danger to life and property" because of the lack of precautions against explosions and fire, such as not smoking near a producing well or pool of oil.
- Born: Józef Wojaczek, Polish Roman Catholic Priest; in Neustadt, Upper Silesia, German Empire (d. 1993)

== April 15, 1901 (Monday) ==
- On the Philippine island of Marinduque, Colonel Maximo Abad, the Filipino resistance leader who led the defeat of American forces at the Battle of Pulang Lupa, became the latest of the insurgents to surrender to the United States following the capture of Emilio Aguinaldo on Luzon.
- The championship of professional basketball was played in Philadelphia between New York City, pennant winners of the National Basket Ball League, and St. James (of Philadelphia), the top finisher of the Interstate Basketball League. Despite falling behind early in the first half, the New York Nationals and St. James were tied at halftime, and again late in the game, before New York "went ahead in a rush" and won, 35 to 22. Reed, New York's designated free-throw shooter, led the scoring with 11 points on 3 field goals and 6 "goals from offense" (foul shots).
- Born:
  - Joe Davis, English snooker and billiards player, 15-time winner of the World Snooker Championship and four time English billiards world champion; in Whitwell, Derbyshire (d. 1978)
  - René Pleven, French state leader, 68th Prime Minister of France; in Rennes (d. 1993)
  - Thomas Ricketts, Dominion of Newfoundland soldier, youngest winner of the Victoria Cross (at 17 years old in 1918); in St. John's, Newfoundland and Labrador (d. 1967)
  - Ajoy Mukherjee, Indian politician, 4th Chief Minister of West Bengal; in Calcutta (d. 1986)
- Died: John Peter Smith, 69, known as "The Father of Fort Worth" for his role in developing Fort Worth, Texas; of blood poisoning, nine days after being beaten and robbed during a visit to St. Louis

== April 16, 1901 (Tuesday) ==
- British colonial authorities in the Cape Colony town of Richmond supplied rifles and ammunition to coloured residents who had volunteered to guard the town against a repeat of the Boer attack in February, creating the first armed Coloured Defence Force.
- Jōkichi Takamine was granted the trademark "Adrenalin" for the synthesized "glandular extractive product" that he had created at Parke, Davis & Company as a pure duplicate of the hormone produced by the adrenal gland. Over time, the U.S. trademark for what is also known as "epinephrine" became generic and is now more commonly spelled "adrenaline".
- Representatives of the occupying nations in Imperial China agreed to the recommendation of Minister Komura of Japan and Mr. Rockhill of the United States to require China to abolish its foreign ministry, the Zongli Yamen, and replace it with a new "Board of Foreign Affairs", referred to as the Waiwubu. An historian would later note that "as the course of subsequent events made clear, the Waiwubu was as ineffective in the establishment of good relations between China and the outside world as the Zongli Yamen had been." Another reform that the foreign nations implemented, as a condition for withdrawal of their troops, was the ceremony for meetings by the ambassadors with the imperial government; "Ministers will be conveyed in imperial chairs to the palace, where they will be received in the hall in which the Emperor entertains imperial Princes".
- Mail carriers in the United States would now be allowed to wear lighter clothing while making their rounds during the summertime, by an order signed by Charles Emory Smith, the United States Postmaster General. Previously, the carriers were required to wear their heavy uniform coats and vests, regardless of the weather. Under the new rule, "During the heated term postmasters may permit letter carriers to wear a neat shirtwaist or loose-fitting blouse, instead of coat and vest, the same to be made of light gray chambray gingham, light gray cheviot, or other light gray washable material; to be worn with turn-down collar, dark tie, and a neat belt; all to be uniform at each office."
- Died:
  - H.A. Rowland, 52, American astrophysicist who perfected the diffraction grating for spectroscopic analysis (b. 1848)
  - James Knibbs, 73, English-American inventor who created in 1859 the first pressure valve for fire engines that could allow multiple hoses and more effective firefighting.

== April 17, 1901 (Wednesday) ==
- On the day before the new regular season was to open, National League owners reversed a rule change that would have allowed pitchers to hit a batter at least three times with the baseball without penalty, and restored the hit by pitch rule that had been abolished on February 27.
- In a letter to General Leonard Wood, U.S. Vice-President Theodore Roosevelt wrote that "the Vice-Presidency is an utterly anomalous office (one which I think ought to be abolished). The man who occupies it may at any moment be everything; but meanwhile, he is practically nothing."
- The town of Latimer, Iowa, was incorporated.
- Born: Raúl Prebisch, Argentine economist, proponent of structuralist economics, co-creator of the Prebisch–Singer hypothesis; in Tucumán (d. 1986)

== April 18, 1901 (Thursday) ==
- The last Carolina parakeet (Conuropsis carolinensis) in the wild was shot by E. A. Hearns, at Paget Creek in Brevard County, Florida. An ornithologist would note later that among this species of parakeet, "those individuals escaping the first blast from the gun hovered over those killed until they too were shot". The last Carolina parakeet in captivity would die on February 21, 1918, at the Cincinnati Zoo.
- The National Council of French Women (Conseil National des femmes françaises or CNFF) was founded in Paris to unite the various French feminist groups that existed in France, and remains the oldest of the women's rights organizations in that nation. CNFF was encouraged by May Wright Sewall, an American who was the second president of the International Council of Women, and had toured Europe to secure the formation of national councils.
- The Beijing palace of Empress Dowager Cixi, temporarily occupied by the Imperial German Army as headquarters for the staff, was set on fire and burned to the ground. Count Alfred von Waldersee, the German Commander, escaped through a window, but his chief of staff, Major General Julius von Schwartzkopf, apparently died in the blaze after going back into the burning building to rescue his pet dog.
- Religious institutions in Portugal were secularized by decree of Prime Minister Ernesto Hintze Ribeiro. Under the new rules, religious congregations were allowed to exist as long as they were "dedicated exclusively to instruction or good works, or to spreading Christianity and civilization in the colonies".
- Baseball's National League began its 1901 season and "what has become known as the Deadball Era unofficially began". Games in New York City, St. Louis and Cincinnati were canceled because of rain, but the Philadelphia Phillies were able to host the Brooklyn Superbas (later the Dodgers). Brooklyn won, 12–7, in front of 4,593 spectators, in a game with 19 singles, six doubles and five triples — but no home runs. The score was atypical for the season, when teams averaged less than five runs per game for the first time in 13 years, a pattern that would continue annually until 1922. The average at season's end would be 4.63 runs.
- United States Secretary of War Elihu Root ordered the withdrawal of 40,000 U.S. Army troops and officers from the Philippines, where they had been deployed to fight Filipino resistance to American control. U.S. President William McKinley, by separate order, directed that no further recruitments for overseas service be made.
- Born:
  - Alexandre Alexeieff, Russian-born French animator and co-creator of pinscreen animation, in Kazan, Russia (d. 1982)
  - Al Lewis, American songwriter, in New York City (d. 1967)

== April 19, 1901 (Friday) ==
- Emilio Aguinaldo, formerly commander of the Philippine resistance, signed a manifesto calling on all of his followers to give up the fight against the American occupation, declaring that "a complete termination of hostilities and lasting peace are not only desirable, but absolutely essential to the welfare of the Philippine Islands," and added that "The country has declared unmistakably in favor of peace; so be it. Enough of blood; enough of tears and desolation ... By acknowledging and accepting the sovereignty of the United States throughout this entire archipelago, as now do without any reservations whatsoever, I believe that I am serving thee, my beloved country. May happiness be thine!"
- Texas Governor Joseph D. Sayers signed a bill that provided that all state taxes collected for 1901 and 1902 from residents of the city of Galveston, Texas would be transferred directly to the city so that it could raise its grade to protect against further flood damage from hurricanes. On September 8, 1900 more than 6,000 people on Galveston Island had been killed by a hurricane.
- Anti-British newspaper publishers were given jail sentences as punishment for incitement against the British presence in South Africa, with the editors of One Land and the South African News getting 12 months imprisonment, and those of the Worcester Advertiser and Het Oozen to six months.
- Died: Alfred Horatio Belo, 61, American businessman and journalist (b. 1839)

== April 20, 1901 (Saturday) ==
- General Manuel Tinio, one of the remaining Filipino insurgent leaders on the island of Luzon, surrendered to U.S. Army Captain Frederick V. Krug, along with his entire command, at Sinait in the Ilocos Sur province, Philippines.
- The finals of England's Football Association Cup took place before a record crowd of 114,815 spectators at London's Crystal Palace outdoor stadium. Tottenham Hotspur, a member of the Southern League, had just taken a 2–1 lead when Sheffield's Walter Bennett got a controversial goal to tie the game. Referee Arthur Kingscott ruled that a save by Spur's George Clawley was over the goal line. There was no scoring in the second half, and the 2–2 tie forced a replay for the following Saturday.
- Born: Michel Leiris, French ethnographer and surrealist writer, in Paris (d. 1990)

== April 21, 1901 (Sunday) ==
- Senator Aníbal Zañartu formed a new government in Chile, agreeing to become the new Minister of the Interior, a post at the time similar to the work of a prime minister in a parliamentary republic. He assembled a cabinet of ministers, and ending a crisis that had operated since March 18.
- A boiler explosion killed 27 crewmen on the Ottoman Navy Nâsır class torpedo boat Seham while the ship was in the outer harbor of Beirut.

== April 22, 1901 (Monday) ==
- The Imperial government of China issued its first edict of reform since the end of the Boxer Rebellion, abolishing the Privy Council that had previously governed the nation in the name of the Emperor, and creating the new "General Board of State Affairs", composed of three Manchu members and three Chinese. Yikuang (Prince Qing) was president, and the other members were including Li Hongzhang, Yung Lu, Kun Kang, Wang Wen Shao, and Lu Chuan Lin. Two viceroys, Li Kun Yih and Zhang Zhidong, were made assistant members.
- A 2,000 man force of French and German troops, accompanied by local Christians, attacked Chinese troops at the Niangzi Pass and the Guguan Pass that led through the Taihang Mountains separating the Shanxi province from the imperial capital in the Hebei province and Beijing.
- Ameer Ben Ali, an Algerian Arab who had been in prison for almost ten years after being wrongfully convicted of the brutal 1891 murder of Carrie Brown in a New York City hotel, was released after evidence was found that exonerated him.
- In a featherweight ("nine-stone" or 126 pounds) boxing bout at the National Sporting Club in London, Murray Livingston of New York City was fighting, as Billy Smith, against Jack Roberts for the nine-stone championship of England. Smith was knocked out, but suffered a fatal injury when he struck his head while falling. A prosecutor indicted Roberts and nine other members of the Club for "feloniously killing and slaying", but conceded at the trial that he was seeking to outlaw boxing rather than to punish the defendants. The jury would conclude that since Smith's death was accidental and happened in a properly regulated boxing contest, the defendants were not guilty. The landmark decision would lead to a police policy to keep order among the crowds, and to presume that properly organized boxing matches were legal.
- Died: William Stubbs, 75, English historian and University of Oxford scholar (b. 1825)

== April 23, 1901 (Tuesday) ==
- Work began in the Philippines for the recovery of the remains of hundreds of American servicemen and civilians who had been killed or who had died while away from home. David H. Rhodes, the Superintendent of the U.S. Burial and Disinterment Corps arrived on the ship El Cano along with his team of 14 morticians, embalmers and grave diggers, and bringing "shovels, pickaxes, spades, screwdrivers, hammers, white lead, disinfectants, and twelve hundred metallic California caskets and wooden shipping crates." During the first expedition of the El Cano, 716 sets of remains were shipped back home to the United States.
- German and Chinese armies battled in the Shanxi Province near the Great Wall of China. The Chinese Army was turned back, but the Germans sustained 30 casualties.
- Voters in the U.S. Alabama overwhelmingly approved a call for a new state constitution that would disenfranchise African Americans, by a margin of 70,305 to 45,505, which included many black voters. In Lowndes County, where more than 80% of the registered voters were black, the call for a constitutional convention was supported by 3,226 of 3,564 votes, and in Dallas County, future site of the Selma March but 80% black at the time, the support was 5,668 to 200.

== April 24, 1901 (Wednesday) ==
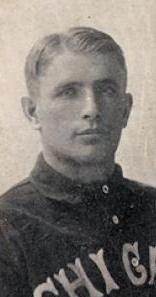
Patterson

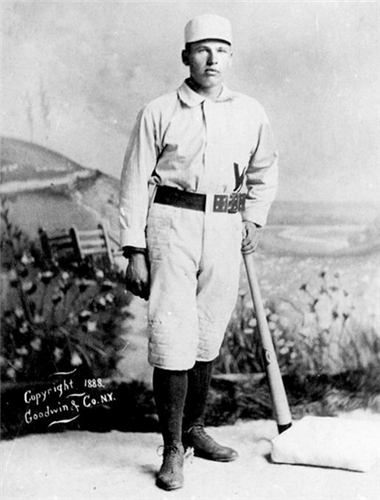
Hoy

- The first-ever game of baseball's American League was played in Chicago, as the Cleveland Blues met the Chicago White Stockings at South Side Park. Ceremonies began at 3:00 in the afternoon, the teams practiced for 30 minutes, Chicago Mayor Carter Harrison IV gave a short speech and then tossed out the first ball. The other three games in the eight team league (Milwaukee at Detroit, Boston at Baltimore and Washington, D.C. at Philadelphia) were canceled by rain. Roy Patterson of Chicago was the first pitcher, and Ollie Pickering was the first to bat for Cleveland, with a ball, a strike, and a fly ball that deaf center fielder William "Dummy" Hoy caught for the first out. Chicago's Fielder Jones (who was also a center fielder) was the first person to score. A crowd of about 9,000 fans watched Chicago (champions from the 1900, when the AL had been a minor league) win the game, 8–2, in a game that took 90 minutes to play.
- The remains of Abraham Lincoln were moved for the eleventh and last time, and placed in the Lincoln Tomb at the Oak Ridge Cemetery in Springfield, Illinois, where, the Chicago Tribune predicted, "the revered bones will be permitted the peace they have failed to secure through their first thirty-five years of decay". Lincoln's sister-in-law, Elizabeth Todd Edwards, was part of a crowd that "was permitted to pass through the tomb and take a final look at the coffin, which, it is expected, will never again be exposed."
- Born: Everett Hall, American philosopher, noted for his advocacy of common sense realism; in Janesville, Wisconsin (d. 1960)
- Died: Richard Henry Brunton, 59, Scottish architect and engineer, known as the "Father of Japanese Lighthouses" for his construction of 26 lighthouses along Japan's coasts (b. 1841)

== Thursday, April 25, 1901 (Thursday) ==
- New York became the first state of the United States to require license plates, as Governor Benjamin Odell signed a bill requiring all automobiles to be registered with the Secretary of State's office. The bill, sponsored by Assemblyman George W. Doughty, had been suggested by the Automobile Club of America, and also set a uniform speed limit of eight miles an hour within cities and villages, and as much as 15 miles an hour on highways in rural locations.
- German engineer Richard Fiedler was granted the first patent for the flamethrower, which he described as Verfahren zur Erzeugung grosser Flammenwassen ("Method of Producing Large Masses of Flame").
- An explosion and fire at a chemical factory in the city of Griesheim, (now a district in Frankfurt), Germany, killed 25 people and severely injured more than 150. At about 4:00 in the afternoon, a small fire ignited containers of picric acid into a fiery blaze that then exploded 18 cylinders of smokeless powder.
- In their very first Major League Baseball game, the Detroit Tigers set a record that continues to stand more than a century later, with the biggest ninth-inning comeback in MLB history. Going into the final inning of the game, the Tigers were losing to the original AL Milwaukee Brewers, 13–4, but team captain Jimmy "Doc" Casey made the first hit for what would become a ten run rally and a 14–13 win.
- Erve Beck of the Cleveland Blues (now the Guardians) hit the first home run in American League history, in a 7–3 loss to the host Chicago White Stockings (now the White Sox).
- The British Army ordered that all householders in occupied territory in South Africa would be required to display signs identifying the names of the persons living inside.
- Oil executive and multimillionaire Henry Flagler succeeded in getting the state of Florida to pass a bill that would allow him to divorce his wife of 20 years, Ida, so that he could marry his mistress, Mary Lily Kenan, whom he would marry on August 24. Under the terms of the bill, which had been introduced only 16 days earlier after Flagler's lobbying of legislators, incurable insanity for at least four years was made a ground for divorce.
- Italian polar explorer Umberto Cagni was forced to turn back, after only 44 days, from his attempt to become the first person to reach the North Pole, but managed to plant the Italian flag further north than any previous explorer. Reaching a latitude of 86° 34′ N, Cagni, who had set off from Russia's Franz Josef Land on March 11, was able to get 20 miles closer to the Pole than Fridtjof Nansen of Norway had done on April 7, 1895.

== April 26, 1901 (Friday) ==
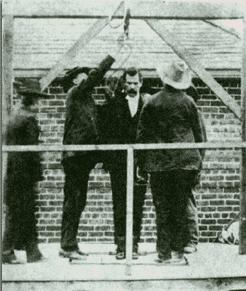
Ketchum hanged

- Tom "Black Jack" Ketchum, 37, a train robber and member of the Hole-in-the-Wall Gang, was hanged at 1:21 p.m. in Clayton, New Mexico. Ketchum is better remembered for his gruesome execution. Union County Sheriff Solome Garcia had never performed a hanging before, misjudged the length of the drop and used a rope that was too thin. Ketchum was decapitated by the force of his 215 pound frame and the quick tightening of the rope, and his body, separated from his head, reportedly "alighted squarely upon its feet, stood for a moment, swayed and fell"
- The Engineering Standards Committee of the United Kingdom held its first meeting, with a goal of reducing the number of different measurements for British products. The Committee's first achievement was to reduce the number of different gauges for streetcar rails from 75 to only five, and the variety of structural steel sections from 175 different sizes to 113, lowering the costs of manufacturing and warehousing steel products. The entity would later change its name to the British Standards Institution, and is known as the BSI Group.
- Died: Halle Tanner Dillon Johnson, 36, African-American physician who became the first woman of any race licensed to practice medicine in the state of Alabama (b. 1864)

== April 27, 1901 (Saturday) ==
- Tottenham Hotspur defeated Sheffield United, 3–1, to become the only non-member of The Football League of England to ever win the FA Cup. The game, which took place at Burnden Park in Bolton was a replay, since Spurs (then a member of the Southern League) and Sheffield had played to a 2–2 draw the previous Saturday.

== April 28, 1901 (Sunday) ==
- General Miguel Malvar took over as the new commander of the Philippine resistance after the capture of Emilio Aguinaldo.
- In Algeria, the village of Marguerite, with more than 150 French settlers and located about 50 miles from Algiers, was attacked by a force of 400 Berber rebels, and most of the inhabitants were massacred.
- The building housing the New York Stock Exchange at 10 Broad Street was closed, 20 years after the opening of an expanded location that had been designed by architect James Renwick Jr. Over the next two years, the NYSE occupied space in the New York Produce Exchange on 2 Broadway until its current location at 11 Wall Street could be constructed. The exchange would move to its current location on April 23, 1903.
- Died: Paule Mink, 61, French feminist and activist (b. 1839)

== April 29, 1901 (Monday) ==
- U.S. President William McKinley departed Washington, D.C. by train at 10:30 a.m., for a 15,000 mile, month-long tour of 25 of the 45 U.S. states, traveling to the west coast and back.
- The Kentucky Derby, now run on the first Saturday of May, took place on a Monday afternoon at Churchill Downs in Louisville, and was won by His Eminence, ridden by African-American jockey Jimmy Winkfield. The favored racehorse, Alard Scheck, finished in last place.
- Liverpool clinched The Football League championship in England on the last day of the season, with a narrow 1–0 win over last place West Bromwich Albion. Going into the match, Liverpool (18–7–8) and Sunderland (15–13–6) were tied in the standings with 43 points apiece, but Sunderland's season was over, and Liverpool needed only to avoid losing.
- Born: Hirohito, 124th Emperor of Japan from 1926 until his death in 1989, in the Aoyama Palace in Tokyo

== April 30, 1901 (Tuesday) ==
- Camillo "Deaf Charley" Hanks was released from prison in Montana after serving almost eight years of a ten year sentence. Initially sentenced to hanging after being convicted of murder, he was spared by the Governor in 1894. Upon gaining his freedom, he quickly went back to crime and joined Butch Cassidy's Wild Bunch gang in a train robbery near Wagner, Montana, on July 3. He would be killed in a shootout with San Antonio detectives on April 15, 1902.
- Born: Simon Kuznets, Ukrainian-American economist and 1971 Nobel Prize laureate, in Kharkov, Russian Empire (d. 1985)
