= March 1901 =

Month in 1901

<<	March 1901					>>
Su	Mo	Tu	We	Th	Fr	Sa
					1	2
3	4	5	6	7	8	9
10	11	12	13	14	15	16
17	18	19	20	21	22	23
24	25	26	27	28	29	30
31

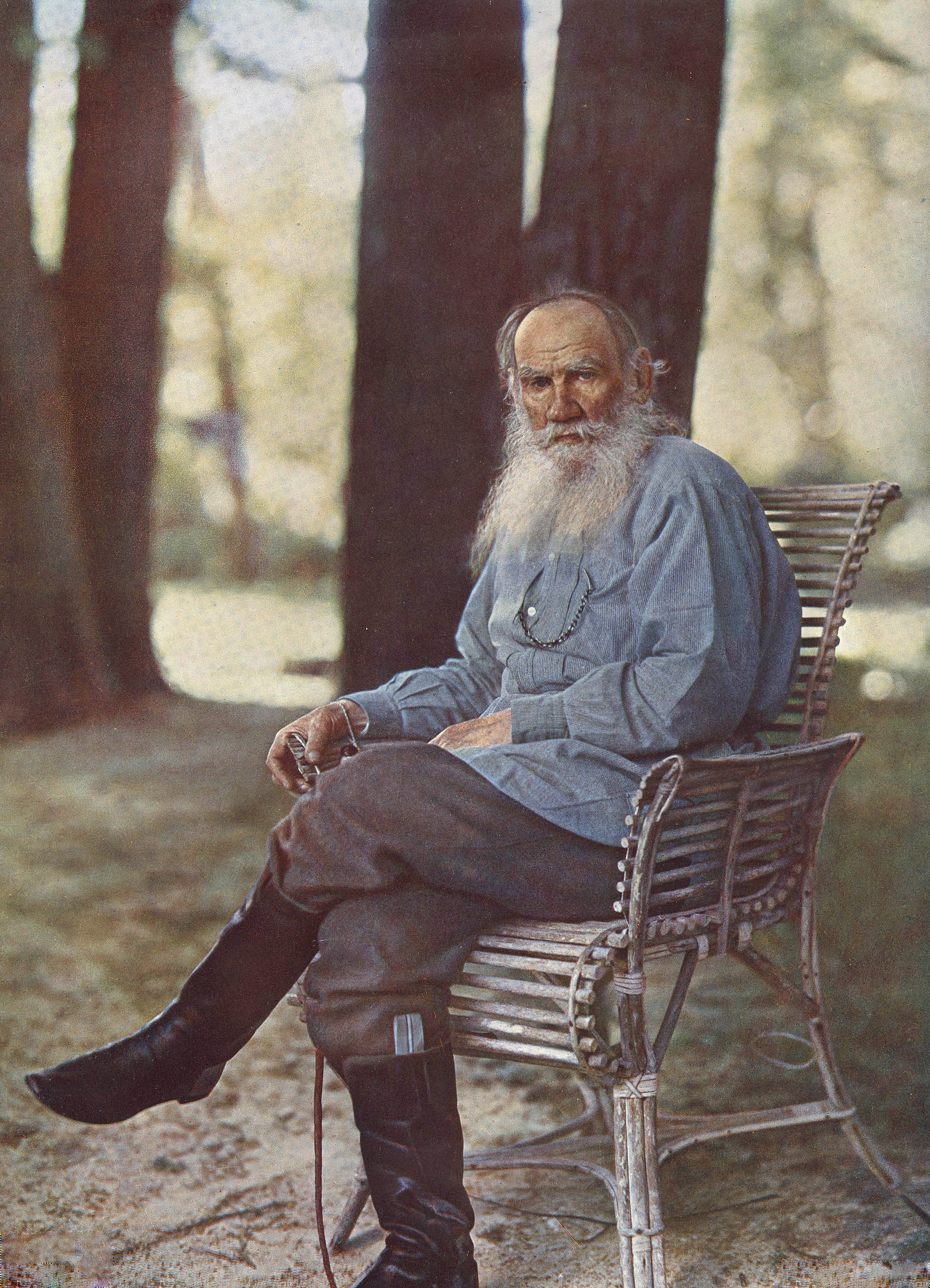
On 9 March 1901, Leo Tolstoy was excommunicated from the Russian Orthodox Church, and banished from the Russian Empire days later.

The following events occurred in March 1901:

== March 1, 1901 (Friday) ==
- Australia's Department of Defence was created, and assumed control over the naval and military forces of the six former colonies, by proclamation made by the Governor-General under Section 69 of the new Constitution. The new department's first headquarters was at Victoria Barracks in Melbourne and assumed jurisdiction over 30,000 total personnel, all but 1,750 of whom were in part-time service. Captain Muirhead Collins of the Royal Australian Navy, who formerly had guided the defense forces of the Victoria colony, became the first Defence Secretary.
- Albert Einstein was published in an academic journal for the first time, when the Annalen der Physik printed "Folgerungen aus der Kapillaritatserscheinungen" ("Deductions from the Phenomena of Capillarity"), which he had submitted on December 13, 1900.
- A wireless telegraph network began operations on the five principal islands of the Territory of Hawaii, allowing instant communication for the first time between Oahu, Hawaii, Maui, Kauai and Molokai.
- Born: Tommy Jarrell, American fiddler and banjo player who attained nationwide recognition in the 1960s; in Round Peak, North Carolina (d. 1985)

== March 2, 1901 (Saturday) ==
- The Platt Amendment, which provided seven conditions for the withdrawal of American troops from Cuba in return for a treaty that would require American approval of most of that new nation's foreign affairs, was signed into law by President William McKinley. Introduced on February 25 by U.S. Senator Orville H. Platt of Connecticut as an addition to an army funding bill, the amendment had passed the United States Senate, 43–20 and the United States House of Representatives, 161–137. The amendment would not be repealed until 1934.
- Liquidation of the Electric Vehicle Company, founded in 1897 by Isaac Rice, then transformed by Samuel Insull into the largest American operator of taxicabs, began when Insull shut down operations of its 109 cars in Chicago following a drivers' strike. Two months later, Boston's 250 car fleet would be idled, and the other cities followed (300 in New York City, 100 in Washington, D.C., a dozen in Philadelphia).
- A column of Russian troops in China was defeated in battle by Chinese defenders at Mukden, with 20 men killed and 30 wounded on the Russian side.

== March 3, 1901 (Sunday) ==
- The Insular Government of the Philippine Islands was established by the United States Congress with the passage of the "Spooner Amendment" that had been sponsored by Senator John Coit Spooner of Wisconsin. Effective July 4, the U.S. military government of the Philippines gave way to a civilian government.
- Yaa Asantewaa, the Queen of the Ashanti Empire (in what is now Ghana), was arrested by British troops, bringing to an end the War of the Golden Stool that had started on March 28, 1900. She was found at the small village of Sreso Tinpomu, south of Kumasi. She would be exiled to the island of Mahé in the Seychelles off the east coast of Africa, and would die at the age of 90 in 1921.
- The National Bureau of Standards was established in the United States on the last day of operations for the 56th United States Congress.
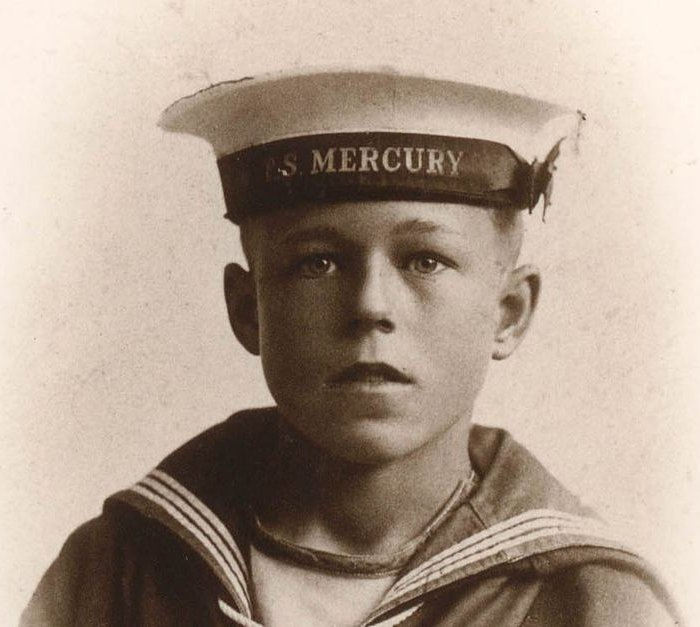
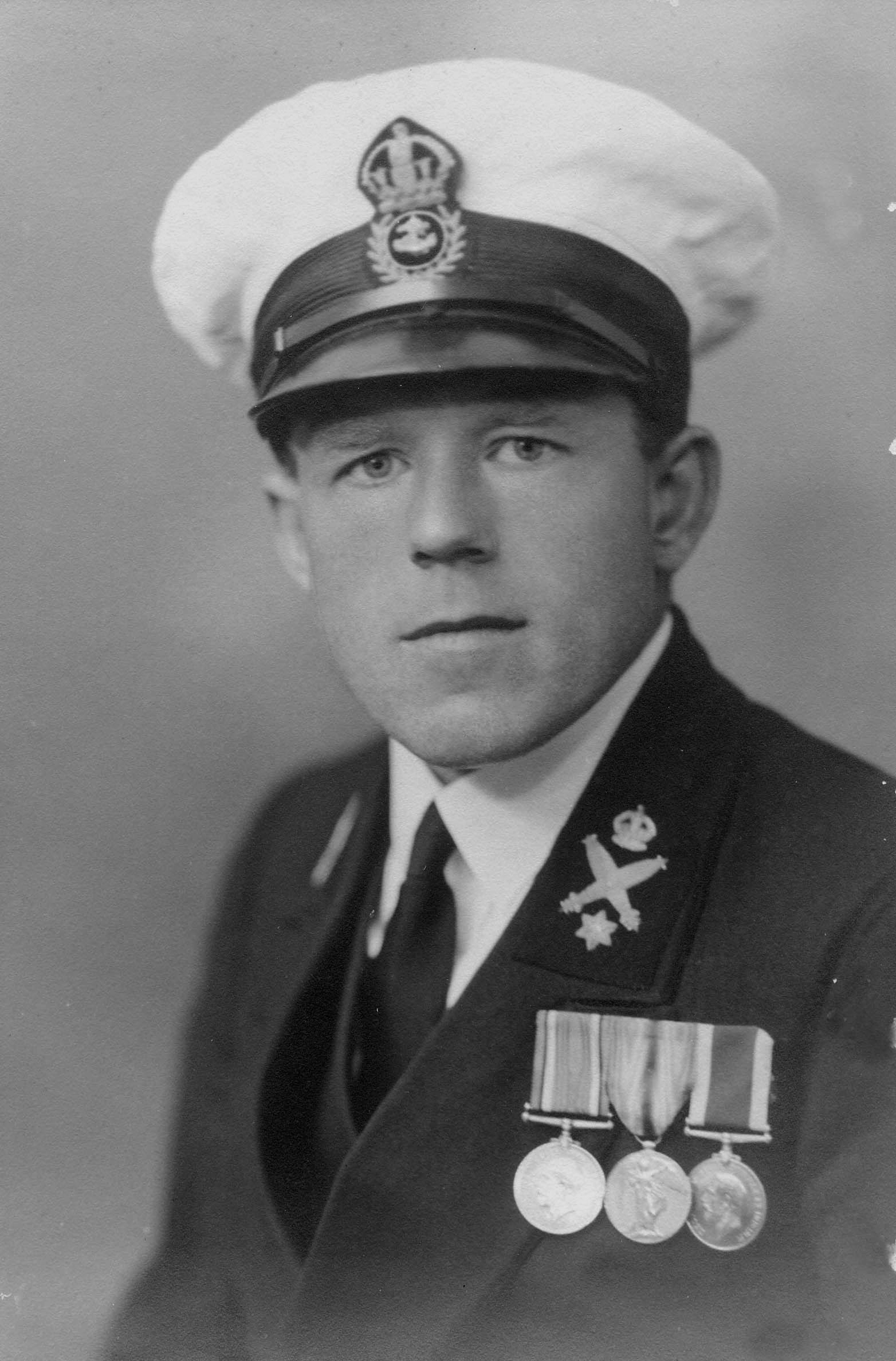
Choules in 1915 and 1936
- Parkfield, California, which lies along the southern Calaveras Fault, a branch of the larger San Andreas Fault, was struck by 6.4 magnitude earthquake, the third in less than 50 years; tremors of at least 6.0 had already shaken Parkfield on January 9, 1857, and February 2, 1881, and would strike again on March 10, 1922, January 8, 1934, and June 28, 1966.
- Born: Claude Choules, British Royal Navy officer and the last surviving combat veteran of World War I; in Pershore, Worcestershire, England. Choules began training in the Royal Navy at the age of 14. (d. 2011)

== March 4, 1901 (Monday) ==
- William McKinley began his second term as President of the United States, and Theodore Roosevelt was sworn into the then-unimportant job of Vice President of the United States. It marked the first time in 28 years that an incumbent president had been sworn in for a second consecutive term. After four Southern states had disenfranchised African-American voters during McKinley's first term, when he was pursuing reconciliation between North and South after the end of the American Civil War and the Reconstruction era, McKinley announced in his second inaugural address, "We are reunited. Sectionalism has disappeared. Division on public questions can no longer be traced on the war maps of 1861. These old differences less and less disturb the judgment."
- Born:
  - Charles Goren, American bridge player, wrote a nationally syndicated column about the game, "Goren on Bridge"; in Philadelphia (d. 1991)
  - Jean-Joseph Rabearivelo, Malagasy-French poet; in Antananarivo, French Madagascar (d. 1937)

== March 5, 1901 (Tuesday) ==
- Sixteen Irish members of the House of Commons of the United Kingdom were ordered to leave during a debate over matters affecting Great Britain (which excluded Ireland even though it was part of the United Kingdom), and all refused. After the resolution for their closure from a debate on the education budget had passed, 220–117, Chairman Balfour House asked them to retire to the lobby. P. A. McHugh responded, "We will not divide," and was cheered by his Irish colleagues. The Speaker of the House then directed the Sergeant-at-Arms to remove the non-compliant members of parliament; first to go was Eugene Crean, from Cork, who fought with the six officers but was finally subdued. In the early hours of Wednesday morning, at about 12:30, policemen were called into the building. Taken, in addition to Crean and McHugh were members Michael Flavin, James Gilhooly, Thomas McGovern, John Cullinan, Patrick O'Brien, William Lundon, William Abraham, Patrick Doogan, Anthony Donelan, Patrick White and Jeremiah Jordan. The Times of London wrote, "Drastic punishment must be meted out to this offense which is all the more unpardonable because clearly deliberate."
- The United States Department of the Treasury announced that the amount of its reserve of gold was higher than ever before in the Department's history, with $489,412,158 of gold bullion in its possession. At the official price at the time of $20.67 per ounce, the figure represented 23,677,414 ounces of gold; the 2015 reported U.S. gold reserve of was 8133.5 metric tons or 286,900,771 ounces.
- Died: Bir Shumsher Jung Bahadur Rana, Nepalese state leader, 48, 11th Prime Minister of Nepal, who had guided modernization and reforms in the Buddhist kingdom

== March 6, 1901 (Wednesday) ==
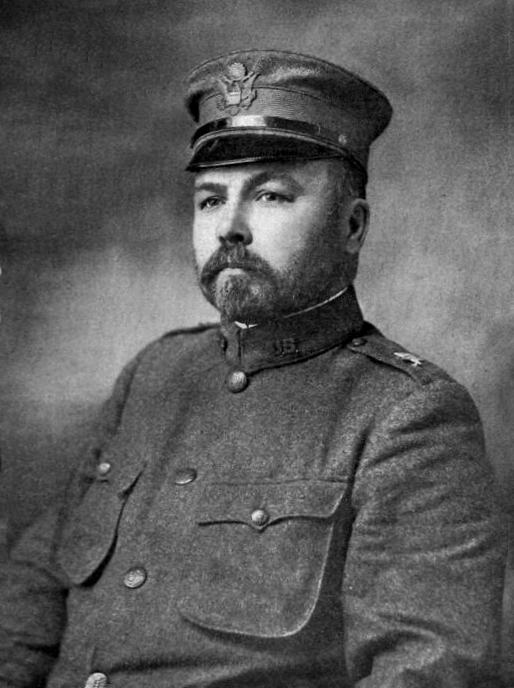
Colonel Funston

- Acting on an intelligence report that had been brought to his camp, Colonel Frederick Funston embarked on a mission to capture the leader of the Philippine opposition, Emilio Aguinaldo. Funston and his group of 88 men departed from Manila Bay on the USS Vicksburg (PG-11) to reach a deserted location on Luzon, about 100 miles (160 km) from Palanan, where Aguinaldo had been seen. Funston's commander, Lieutenant General Arthur MacArthur Jr., told him, "Funston, this is a desperate undertaking. I fear that I shall never see you again."
- During a visit to Bremen, Kaiser Wilhelm of Germany was struck in the face by a sharp iron object thrown at him in an apparent assassination attempt. The assailant, identified as Deidrich Weiland, was adjudged to be insane. The Kaiser was riding in a coach to the railway station when the incident happened at 10:10 pm, and the object thrown "afterward proved to be a fishplate". The German Emperor was left with a deep wound, 1.5 inches (38 mm) long, below his left eye; the Chief of the Naval Ministry would note later, "On the temple or in the eye the blow could have been devastating. The wonder of it is that our All-Gracious Lord felt neither the object flying at him nor, in the rain, the copiously flowing blood; it was those around him who drew his attention to it at first." Despite rumors in the press that the Kaiser had sunk into a depression, he would say in a speech at month's end, "nothing is more false than to pretend that my sanity has suffered in some way. I am exactly the same as I was; I have become neither elegiac nor melancholic... everything stays the same."
- After Marcelo Azcárraga Palmero resigned, Práxedes Mateo Sagasta became the Prime Minister of Spain for the seventh time in thirty years. Sagasta had also been the Premier in 1872, 1874, 1881–1883, 1885–1890, 1892–1895, and 1897–1899. He would serve for the seventh, and final, time for 21 months, ending on December 6, 1902.
- In Dohnavur, in the Madras division of British India, a seven-year-old girl named Preena was able to find sanctuary at a Christian mission, after escaping from being sold into prostitution. She told missionary Amy Carmichael about the human trafficking that prevailed throughout the area and the practice of "temple prostitution"; in some Hindu temples where Perumal was worshipped as an incarnation of Vishnu, young girls were kept captive for the purpose. Carmichael would create a sanctuary and school, the Dohnavur Fellowship, to protect as many youngsters as possible from a similar fate. She would become known locally as Ammai, a variation of both "Amy" and of Amma, the Tamil language word for "mother", and would be credited with rescuing over 1,000 children from traffickers. Her 1932 book about the mission, The Gold Cord, would become a bestseller.
- Born: Robert Hall, Australian economist, chief economic advisor to the British government from 1947 to 1961; in Tenterfield, New South Wales, Australia (d. 1988)
- Died: John Jabez Edwin Mayall, 87, British portrait photographer, known for his portraits of the royal family taken in 1860

== March 7, 1901 (Thursday) ==
- A grand jury in Anderson County, South Carolina, indicted four leading citizens in Anderson "and a score of guards" after finding that they had been operating a slavery system. County Judge Benet had asked for an investigation, and the investigators determined that many African Americans had been seized while traveling, sent to stockade prison camps for felons (despite having never been convicted of a felony at all), and then put to work for local landowners.
- The state of Texas formally adopted Lupinus subcarnosus, the sandyland bluebonnet, as its official flower.

== March 8, 1901 (Friday) ==
- The Delaware Senate adjourned without being able to agree on anyone to fill either of the vacancies for Senator, leaving the state completely unrepresented in that with only one member in the United States Senate. The term of Richard R. Kenney had expired on March 3, while the seat last occupied by George Gray had been vacant since the expiration of Gray's term two years earlier. On the 45th ballot taken since January 16, Democrat Kenney had 23 votes, four short of the 27 necessary for a majority, while Republican J. Edward Addicks, who had been fighting for a seat since 1895, had 16, and two other Republican candidates, Henry A. Du Pont and former U.S. Senator Anthony Higgins, had 7 and 6, respectively. On voting for the other vacancy, Willard Salisbury had 23 votes, Addicks had 22, and Robert H. Richards had 7.
- The House of Commons of the United Kingdom voted, 264 to 51, to amend its rules in order to provide for a one-year expulsion from the House of any member who refused to leave the chambers when ordered. The measure followed Tuesday evening's forcible removal of 16 Irish members of parliament from a debate. However, a motion to have recalcitrant members of parliament imprisoned, made by MP Hugh Cecil, was unanimously rejected. Cecil, the son of Prime Minister Lord Salisbury, was jeered by the Irish members (taunts included "Why don't you behead us?"). After Hugh finished, his father, the Prime Minister, "was kindly but candidly explaining to the young man that his amendment was impossible" and Hugh left the chambers.
- After a seven-hour battle, German troops captured the Zhongshun Pass between the North Zhili and Shanxi provinces in China.
- A seven-day halt in fighting in the Second Boer War was called by Lord Kitchener of the United Kingdom, in order to allow South Africa's General Louis Botha time to communicate proposed peace terms with other Boer commanders.
- An assassination attempt failed against Konstantin Pobedonostsev, the Chief Procurator of the Russian Empire and a member of the cabinet of Tsar Nicholas.
- Both Houses of the United States Congress adjourned for the summer after a one-week opening session. With no further duties over the Senate, Vice-president Theodore Roosevelt left for a long vacation with his family at Sagamore Hill, Roosevelt's home on Long Island. He would have no further duties for nearly six months until being summoned on September 6 to be by the side of the mortally wounded President.
- On the last day of the organizing session of the new United States Senate, the Senate Park Commission was created, to provide a comprehensive plan for turning the layout of Washington, D.C., into its present form, with reflecting pools, monuments and other structures incorporated into the seat of government. The sponsor, U.S. Senator James McMillan of Michigan, would pass away in less than a year-and-a-half later, shortly after the commission's plan was published and accepted.
- "Cal Poly", the California Polytechnic State University, was born with the signing of the Polytechnic School Bill by California Governor Henry Gage. Initially, the institution was a high school in San Luis Obispo, a project that local journalist Myron Angel had lobbied six years for, and its mandate was "to furnish to young people of both sexes mental and manual training in the arts and sciences, including agriculture, mechanics, engineering, business methods, domestic economy, and such other branches as will fit the students for non-professional walks of life". It would become a two-year technical school in 1933, and a four-year college in 1940.
- The British steamer Aviona struck a breakwater in the Port of Bilbao, Spain and sank, drowning 23 of its crew.

== March 9, 1901 (Saturday) ==
- Leo Tolstoy was excommunicated from the Russian Orthodox Church, as announced by the official publication of the Holy Synod. "Count Leo Tolstoi," the statement said, "to the grief and horror of the whole orthodox world has, by speech and writing, unceasingly striven to separate himself from all communion with the Orthodox Church... Consequently, the Orthodox Church no longer considers him to be one of the members and cannot regard him as such as long as he does not repent and does not become reconciled to the Church."
- A fire completely destroyed the Oldsmobile factory owned by Ransom E. Olds but, as a historian would write in 1934, "what seems bad fortune at one time may become the basis of later triumph. Something like that came to pass in the fire which destroyed the Olds Plant..." All but one of the Olds vehicles were burned up, but an enterprising employee, James J. Brady, rescued the prototype for the small Oldsmobile Runabout (also known as the "Curved Dash"). Because of the catastrophe, Olds was forced to rely upon outside suppliers to produce machine parts that had formerly been built inside the factory, so that "[t]he manufacture of his cars became essentially an assembly process" (at a new location in Lansing). The price of an Olds car dropped from $2,382 to $625, and by the end of 1902, Olds was manufacturing about 25% of the autos built in the United States
- The Olds fire also proved to be a big break for other auto manufacturers. Henry M. Leland and his company, Leland & Faulconer, were given a contract to make 2,000 engines for Olds, and the influx of capital made it possible for Leland to create and manufacture his vision for a line of luxury cars, the Cadillac. At the same time, Olds contracted with brothers John Dodge and Horace Dodge to manufacture the transmissions for the new Runabouts.
- Following the recent campaign by Carrie Nation and her followers against saloons and liquor-selling establishments, women voted in large numbers in primaries across Kansas to nominate candidates who had pledged to outlaw the sale of alcohol.
- Born: Joachim Hämmerling, Danish-German biologist whose 1943 experiments determined that the cell nucleus controls the development of organisms; in Berlin (d. 1980). The plant Acetabularia haemmerlingii, of the genus Acetabularia that he used in his experiments, is named in his honor.

== March 10, 1901 (Sunday) ==
- A rare instance of blood rain took place in southern and central Italy, including the island of Sicily.
- A new species of jellyfish, Rhopilema Frida, was discovered by Ernst Haeckel in the Malaccan Straits. Haeckel named it in honor of his mistress, Frida von Uslar-Gleichen, whom he described as "the artistic friend of nature, who has advanced the Kunstformen der Natur in numerous ways by her exquisite judgment."

== March 11, 1901 (Monday) ==
- The first of many large tourist resorts in Hawaii, the Moana Hotel, opened for business on the Waikiki beach, outside of Honolulu, with an afternoon tour of the rooms and dinner and entertainment for investors, newspaper reporters and VIPs. The first overnight guests were registered the next day, March 12, with rooms for $1.50 per night. Located at what is now 2365 Kalakaua Avenue in Honolulu, the hotel is now operated as the Westin Moana Surfrider.
- At the age of five, Joseph Frank Keaton made his New York City comedy debut as "Buster", the star of his parents' vaudeville act, at Proctor's 125th Street Theater. Joe and Myra Keaton had first introduced their son to their routines in October, and he quickly became the centerpiece as "Buster, The smallest real comedian". With a natural talent for making people laugh, Buster Keaton would become a legend in comedy films.
- U.S. Army Captain Ralph Van Deman, director of the Division of Military Information for the American occupation forces in the Philippines, instituted a program of creating "identity cards", a central file of individual records on all Filipino persons of interest in the war against the Filipino insurgents. Files were opened by garrison commanders on captured guerrilla officers "but also on priests, civic officials, and all other important people in their communities". Although the insurgency would soon collapse, the idea would continue; Van Deman, later nicknamed "The Father of American Military Intelligence", would perfect the system of individual file records as director of the United States Department of War's Military Intelligence Section.
- The tanker ship Atlas departed from Port Arthur, Texas, with 3,000 barrels of crude oil from the Spindletop oil fields, bound for the Standard Oil refineries in Philadelphia, marking the first shipments of Texas oil.
- Eight people were killed and 51 injured in a boiler explosion at the Doremus Laundry at 458 West Madison Street in Chicago. Employees had started working at 7:30 in the morning, and 36 had clocked in when the boiler, located in a corner of the building, blew up, collapsing the three-story structure. All of the dead worked in the laundry. Many of the injured were passersby who were walking along Madison Street, and 17 of them were hospitalized. The blast took place somewhere between 8:07 and 8:14, judging by stopped clocks in the building.
- The United Kingdom rejected the Hay–Pauncefote Treaty, as amended by the United States Senate, because the Senate had voted to fortify any canal built across Central America between the Atlantic and Pacific Oceans. The British had agreed not to contest the exclusive American right to build or control a canal, but had opposed the placement of military weapons. The official reply was delivered to United States Secretary of State John Hay by the British Ambassador, Julian Pauncefote.
- The village of Tenstrike, Minnesota, was incorporated, and with a name derived from a contemporary slang term for complete success, as well as the term for what is now referred to in bowling as simply a "strike".

== March 12, 1901 (Tuesday) ==
- Almost all black African residents of Cape Town, South Africa, were forcibly removed by orders of John Gregory, the Chief Medical Officer of Britain's Cape Colony, for the ostensible purpose of controlling an outbreak of the bubonic plague. The only exceptions to the order, recommended by British plague specialist Dr. William Simpson, were "a small number of African freeholders and leaseholders, domestic servants, and stevedores housed near the docks". The quarantined persons were confined to the Matiland Plague Hospital at Uitvlugt, 5 miles (8.0 km) away, and their possessions burned.
- The Russian Writers' Union for Mutual Aid, which had been founded in 1897 in Saint Petersburg, was ordered permanently disbanded by Dmitry Sipyagin, the Minister of Internal Affairs, after officers of the group had participated in a political demonstration a week earlier.
- Died: Harry Redford, 59, Australian bushranger, inspiration for "Captain Starlight" in the Australian novel Robbery Under Arms

== March 13, 1901 (Wednesday) ==
- In reply to an inquiry by Admiral Otto von Diederichs, and at the request of Kaiser Wilhelm, Field Marshal Alfred von Schlieffen sent his calculations for the force necessary for American invasion and occupation plans, and his battle plan. In Schlieffen's judgment, the United States would be able to move 100,000 men to defend an assault on Cape Cod Bay, and Germany would need to land its own 100,000 troops on the Cape Cod peninsula, 100,000 more to move against Boston and an even larger force to secure New York City, and added "fuer ein vordringen in amerika wuerde aber auch diese zahl voraussichtlich in keiner weise ausreichen" ("for an advance into America, even this number would not, in any way, be expected to be sufficient"). Diedrichs was furious with Schlieffen's vague and evasive reply. Historian Paul Kennedy wrote later, "In retrospect it can be seen that Schlieffen's letter of 13 March 1901 formed a turning point in the formulation of the operations plan against the United States— despite Diederich's continued efforts on behalf of the direct invasion project."
- Andrew Carnegie, who had recently sold all of his stock in Carnegie Steel, announced that he was prepared to give $5,200,000 to the City of New York to build 65 branch libraries, on the condition that the city furnish the sites and guarantee their maintenance. Other donations announced were $4,000,000 for disabled and retired employees of Carnegie Steel, $7,000,000 for maintenance of Carnegie libraries around Pittsburgh, and $1,000,000 for a library in St. Louis.
- The Arizona Rangers, a short-lived law enforcement body modeled after the Texas Rangers, were established by the Arizona Territorial Legislature, with a unit consisting of commander Burton C. Mossman, a sergeant, and 12 Rangers who would ride on horseback and search for outlaws. Over almost eight years, 107 men would serve as Rangers until the Territorial Legislature's abolition of the Rangers on February 15, 1909.
- Nadir of American race relations: In Corsicana, Texas, a white mob followed the example set two months earlier in Leavenworth, Kansas, and burned an African-American man at the stake in front of the Navarro County Courthouse. John Henderson had confessed to the murder of a white woman, Mrs. Conway Younger, and was being transported to a prison in Fort Worth for his own safety, but a mob overpowered the officers guarding him when the train reached Itasca.
- Died: Benjamin Harrison, 67, the 23rd President of the United States, died at his home at 1214 North Delaware Street in Indianapolis, a week after contracting pneumonia. Harrison served one term as president, from 1889 to 1893.

== March 14, 1901 (Thursday) ==
- Utah's Governor Heber Wells vetoed a bill that would have prevented criminal prosecution of polygamy. Earlier in the week, the state Senate had voted 11–7 to approve the measure and the state House of Representatives had concurred, 25–17. In his statement, Governor Wells wrote, "I have the honor to return herewith, without approval, senate bill No. 119... No official act of my life has been approached by me with a sense of responsibility so profound as is involved in the consideration of this bill." He noted, "I have every reason to believe its enactment would be the signal for a general demand upon the national congress for a constitutional amendment directed solely against certain social conditions here, a demand which, under the circumstances, would surely be complied with. While it may be urged that in any event only the few could be made to suffer, is it not an odious thought, repulsive to every good citizen, of whatsoever creed or party, that the whole state should thus be put under a ban?" Wells acknowledged that he was "myself a product of that marriage system" (when Governor Wells was born in 1859, his mother was the second of seven wives of his father, Daniel H. Wells) "taught from infancy to regard my lineage as approved of the Almighty, and proud today, as I have ever been, of my heritage", but as for the bill, "in offering a phantom of relief to a few, it, in reality, invites a deluge of discord and disaster upon all."
- Born: Wilhelm Hallermann, German forensic physician who, along with Enrico Streiff, became the first scientist to identify the Hallermann–Streiff syndrome; in Arnsberg, Germany (d. 1975)
- Died: Sam Browne, 76, British Indian Army cavalry officer who invented the Sam Browne belt after losing his left arm while fighting in the Indian Rebellion of 1857. Needing to be able to have his battle sword and scabbard at the ready, Captain Browne fashioned a second belt that came over the right shoulder and diagonally to his waist belt, and the modification quickly became standard issue for soldiers.

== March 15, 1901 (Friday) ==
- Philippe Bunau-Varilla, a French engineer lobbying to have the proposed canal between the Atlantic and Pacific Oceans to be built across the Panama (at the time, the northernmost province of Colombia), rather than Nicaragua, began distribution of the pamphlet Nicaragua or Panama to each U.S. Senator and Congressman. Along with the pamphlet, he also provided each recipient a Nicaraguan postage stamp that depicted the active Momotombo volcano. His point was to emphasize his assertion that, unlike Nicaragua, the route across Panama had "no winds, no currents (except on rare occasions), no sharp curves, no sediments, no bad harbors, no volcanoes" and added "look at the Nicaraguan postage stamps. Young nations like to put on their coat of arms what best symbolizes their moral domain or characterizes their soil. What have the Nicaraguans chosen to characterize their country on their coat of arms, on their postage stamps? Volcanoes!"
- The results of the 1901 Census of India were released. It was the fourth census of the British Raj, but the first considered to be reliable, and showed the population to be more than 294,000,000 people. The exact count for British India in 1901 (an area encompassing modern-day India, Pakistan, Bangladesh and Burma) was 294,361,056.
- Eleven years after the artist's suicide, 71 of the paintings of Vincent van Gogh were placed on exhibit at the Galerie Bernheim-Jeune in Paris. During the 17-day Van Gogh retrospective, the Dutch artist attained a fame that had escaped him during his lifetime.
- American troops were ordered withdrawn from Beijing, with the exception of 150 men to guard the American legation to China.

== March 16, 1901 (Saturday) ==
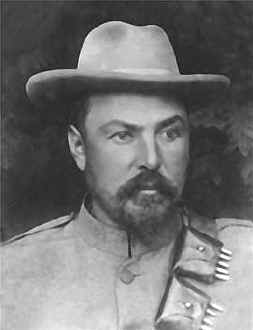
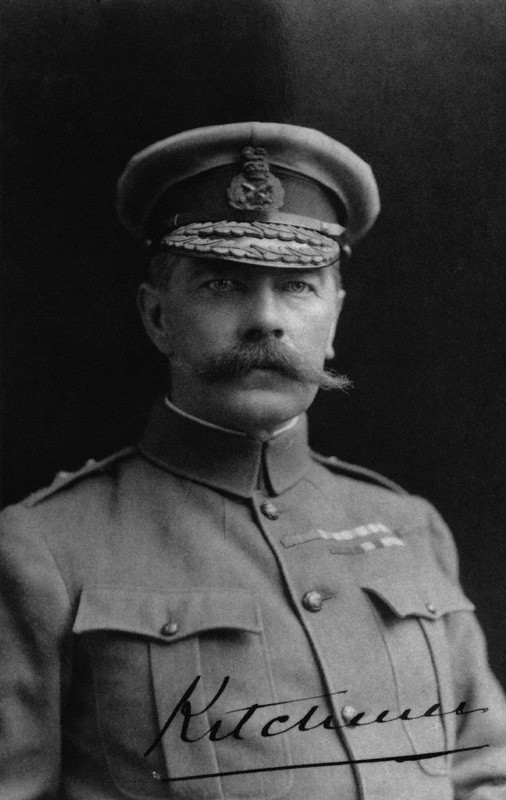
Generals Botha and Kitchener
- The Boers' General Louis Botha informed the British commanding general, Lord Kitchener, that he was unable to accept Britain's terms for peace and provided no explanation. However, a London paper, the Daily Chronicle, would break the news on March 22 that the major disputes were that Kitchener insisted on "the full privilege of citizenship to properly domiciled and registered blacks", and had refused amnesty to the Boer leaders in the Cape Colony. Kitchener had offered self-government for the South African Republic and the Orange Free State, one million British pounds as compensation for destroyed property, low-interest reconstruction loans and other concessions.
- General Mariano Trías, second only to General Emilio Aguinaldo in the leadership of the Philippine resistance, surrendered unconditionally to the United States at his encampment at San Francisco de Malabon in Cavite. The city is now named General Trias.
- Prince George, who had become the Crown Prince of the United Kingdom only six weeks earlier upon the ascension of his father to the throne as King Edward VII, began an eight-month trip around the world on an inspection of the British Empire. Accompanied by his wife, Princess Mary, he departed from Portsmouth on board RMS Ophir, an ocean liner acquired as a royal yacht. Along the way, the future King George V would visit Australia, New Zealand, Singapore and Canada.
- Wesele (The Wedding), a play by Stanisław Wyspiański that has been described as "a legend... which lives on to this day" was staged for the first time. The first performance was at a theater in Kraków, which was, at the time, part of the Austria-Hungary Empire.
- Dita H. Kinney was named as the first Superintendent of the newly organized United States Army Nurse Corps.
- Luna County, New Mexico, was created from portions of southern Grant County and western Doña Ana County. It was named for wealthy sheep rancher Solomon Luna during his lifetime, and a courthouse was authorized for the new county seat at Deming.
- The town of Millinocket, Maine, was incorporated.
- Fernand de Rodays, the editor of the daily Paris newspaper Le Figaro, was shot and wounded in a duel with Count Boni de Castellane at the Velodrome of the Parc des Princes. Three days earlier, the Count and Rodays had argued over an article in the newspaper, and, at 3:30, faced off with pistols after "the most careful precautions had been taken to avoid the intrusion of any outsiders".
- Born: P. B. Gajendragadkar, Indian judge, 7th Chief Justice of India, 6th and 7th chairman of the Law Commission of India; in Satara, Bombay Province, British India (d. 1981)

== March 17, 1901 (Sunday) ==
- Thousands of protesters gathered at Kazan Square in Saint Petersburg, the capital of the Russian Empire, to demonstrate against the severe limitations against students. Many of Russia's intellectuals, members of the Writers Union, led a peaceful protest. "The authorities," it would later be written, "who had never before been faced with a demonstration of this size, decided to teach the participants a lesson", and encouraged the mounted police, many of them loyal Cossacks, to injure members of the crowd. The Cossacks' weapon of choice was the nagaika, a whip with an embedded piece of metal, while the police on horseback swung sabres. Sixty people were hurt, and more than 1,500 were arrested; students who were picked up would be detained for three weeks and then expelled from the university and banished from the city altogether. The date of the riots was March 4 on the calendar used at the time in Russia, 13 days behind the Gregorian calendar.
- Sheikh Mubarak Al-Sabah, the emir of Kuwait, was defeated in the Battle of Serif, ending his campaign to take control of the Emirate of Jabal Shammar, located in much of what later became Saudi Arabia. In the fight against the forces of the Rashidi Emir, Abdulaziz bin Mutaib Al Rashid, Mubarak lost most of his forces, including the commanding general, Hamoud Sabah II, his brother, Khalifa Abdullah II, and two nephews.
- Phoa Keng Hek opened the first school for the Tionghoa, the Indonesian language name for its Chinese minority, in Batavia, the Dutch East Indies (now Jakarta, Indonesia). The Tiong Hoa Hwee Koan (THHK), a derivation of the Chinese phrase Zhong Hua Hui Guan, or Chinese Association, had been approved in 1900 by the Dutch colonial government for its purpose of preserving Chinese culture.
- Born:
  - Ludolf von Alvensleben, German state official SS and police leader for Nazi Germany in Poland during World War II who escaped to Argentina to avoid war crimes; in Halle an der Saale, Germany (d. 1970)
  - Severino Di Giovanni, Italian-Argentine anarchist; in Chieti, Italy (d. 1931, executed)
  - Marquis Childs, American journalist and novelist; in Clinton, Iowa (d. 1990)
- Died: Elijah Kellogg, 87, American children's author whose works included the Elm Island series and Pleasant Cove series of books

== March 18, 1901 (Monday) ==
- Baron Hermann von Eckardstein, the Germany's chargé d'affaires to the United Kingdom, suggested to Britain's Foreign Secretary, Lord Lansdowne, the possibility of a defensive alliance between the German and British Empires. Lansdowne considered the proposal, and sent four questions to his German counterpart, Foreign Affairs Secretary Oswald von Richthofen, about whether the proposed alliance would be unconditional, or secret, or inclusive with Japan, or feasible in light of anti-British public sentiment in Germany.
- Born:
  - William H. Johnson, American painter, member of the Harlem Renaissance expressionist school; in Florence, South Carolina (d. 1970)
  - Manly P. Hall, Canadian-American mystic, author of The Secret Teachings of All Ages; in Peterborough, Ontario (d. 1990)
- Died: Patrick Donahoe, 90, Irish American creator (in 1836) of The Pilot, which now bills itself as "America's Oldest Catholic Newspaper"

== March 19, 1901 (Tuesday) ==
- The government of Prussia took the lead in alleviating the housing shortage in Germany by directing the Governors of Prussia's twelve provinces to recommend all cities, towns and village governments to buy as much available land as possible, so that municipal governments could build and own more residential units.
- Three Boer prisoners of war, convicted of murder for the wrecking of a British troop train, were executed by firing squad at De Aar, Northern Cape, South Africa by order of Lord Kitchener.
- Dr. John Harvey Kellogg was granted the first United States Patent for "Protose", a blend of nuts and grain cereals, as a "vegetable substitute for meat". "Nuttose", introduced by Kellogg in 1896 and made primarily from peanuts and said to resemble "cold roast mutton", had been the first commercial alternative to meat, but had not been patented. In applying for U.S. Patent No. 670,283 for "Vegetable-food Compound", the well-known nutritionist described Protose as a product "which shall possess equal or greater nutritive value in equal or more available form ... By proper regulation of the temperature and proportions of the ingredients, various meat-like flavors are developed, which give the finished product very characteristic properties."
- Nadir of American race relations: Tiptonville, Tennessee, a town of 700 people, was destroyed by a fire three days after white townsmen had lynched Ike Fitzgerald, a black man accused of raping a white woman. It was speculated that the blaze, which burned 30 buildings and residences, including all of the stores on the main street, had been deliberately set by African Americans in reprisal for Fitzgerald's lynching.
- The state of Washington ceded all jurisdiction over the territory within the Mount Rainier National Park to the United States government, less than two years after the park had been created as a joint federal and state venture.
- Born:
  - James J. Delaney, American politician, New York Congressman for 28 years, author of the Food Additives Amendment of 1958 (also known as the "Delaney clause"), strictly prohibiting the addition of potentially carcinogenic ingredients to foods; in New York City (d. 1987)
  - Gerrit Jan van Heuven Goedhart, Dutch public servant, first United Nations High Commissioner for Refugees; in Bussum, Netherlands (d. 1956)
  - Joseph Jastak, Polish-American psychologist, and co-creator (with Sidney W. Bijou in 1936) of the Wide Range Achievement Test, one of the original standardized tests for measuring the educational achievements of schoolchildren; in Gostycyn, Poland (d. 1979)
  - Josef Wirmer, German lawyer, participant in the 1944 conspiracy to assassinate Adolf Hitler; in Paderborn, Germany (d. 1944, executed)
- Died: Zerelda G. Wallace, 83, American advocate for women's suffrage, and former First Lady of Indiana from 1837 to 1840, when her husband David Wallace was Governor of Indiana

== March 20, 1901 (Wednesday) ==
- At the direction of Admiral Otto von Diederichs, Germany's Hubert von Rebeur-Paschwitz accompanied the ship SMS Vineta to Boston. While the Vineta was in the American port for a supposed "routine repair stop", Rebeur-Paschwitz and Richard von Kap-herr surveyed possible landing sites for an American invasion, and concluded that Rockport and Gloucester, Massachusetts, would be ideal locations.
- Died: Edmond Got, 78, French stage actor and comedian

== March 21, 1901 (Thursday) ==
- General Ananías Diokno, commander of the Philippine resistance on the island of Panay, ordered his men to surrender their weapons to the United States Army, and General Leandro L. Fullon became one of the first to comply giving up his men and 150 rifles.
- RRS Discovery, the last traditional wooden three-masted ship to be built in Great Britain, was launched from Dundee, Scotland. Built specifically for the British National Antarctic Expedition, led by Robert Falcon Scott and Ernest Shackleton, the Royal Research Ship would depart for Antarctica on August 6. Lady Markham, the wife of Sir Clements Markham, the organizer of the Expedition, "snipped a tape with a pair of golden scissors and the Discovery slid gracefully into the Tay.
- Nikola Tesla applied for the patent for "Apparatus for the Utilization of Radiant Energy", which he described as "a machine to capture the sun's cosmic rays and turn them into electricity". U.S. Patent No. 685,957 would be granted on November 5.
- Born:
  - Karl Arnold, German politician who served as the first President of the German Bundesrat upon the creation of West Germany. Sworn into office on September 7, 1949, six days before the inauguration of Theodor Heuss as the new nation's first Federal President, Arnold was the acting head of state, based on Article 57 of the Grundgesetz, the nation's constitution, which provides that the Bundesrat president shall exercise the powers of the federal president if the office is vacant; in Warthausen, Germany (d. 1958)
  - Carmelita Geraghty, American silent film actress; in Rushville, Indiana (d. 1966)

== March 22, 1901 (Friday) ==
- Fodi Kabba, the 69-year-old Mandinka ruler of the lands south of the Gambia River, was killed in a battle with a joint British and French expedition against his Marabout forces. Kabba, who had led random attacks for more than 20 years, had fought to the end, from his fortress at Medina, in what is now the Casamance area of Senegal. After French forces took the town without resistance, the gunpowder warehouse beneath Kabba's home exploded, killing his 40 wives.
- British and Russian occupation troops in the Chinese city of Tianjin withdrew at 5:00 in the morning, after it appeared that the two armies would go to war over the Russian threat to the Northern China Railroad.
- The Boer mayor of Maraisburg was arrested and charged with treason by the government of the South African Republic.
- Roselle Park, New Jersey, was created by act of the state legislature.
- Born: Greta Kempton, Austrian-American painter, served as the official White House portrait artist during the Truman administration; in Vienna (d. 1991)

== March 23, 1901 (Saturday) ==
- Emilio Aguinaldo, leader of the Philippine resistance to the American takeover of the islands, was captured alive, following a daring ruse by U.S. Army Colonel Frederick Funston and his 88-man party of American soldiers and native collaborators. Funston's party had made a 100-mile (160 km) journey over the previous ten days to reach President Aguinaldo's capital at Palanan. The four Filipino scouts, dressed in insurgent uniforms and preceded by an authentic looking message, forged on Brigade Lacuna letterhead, were welcomed into Palanan, and two of them were invited into Aguinaldo's residence to report on reinforcements and on the capture of American prisoners. One of the two scouts gave the signal to the two others outside the residence, and within moments, Funston's troops broke into the Palanan compound and took Aguinaldo as prisoner, then took him to a waiting gunboat. Aguinaldo would take the oath of allegiance to the United States, bringing an effective end to the American war in the Philippines. Colonel Funston, commander of the 20th Kansas Infantry, was promoted to brigadier general by President William McKinley in recognition of his services.
- After weeks of rioting throughout Russia, the cabinet voted not to enforce a law that allowed protesting students to be drafted into the Imperial Russian Army.
- France's Minister of War, General Louis André, issued an order prohibiting the sale of alcoholic drinks in barracks and camps throughout the French colonies.
- John Hay, the United States Secretary of State, presented a U.S. Treasury warrant for $100,000 to Spain, and the Spanish ambassador, Duke d'Arcos, provided the instruments of cession of "any and all islands of the Philippine archipelago lying outside of the line described in article 3" of the 1898 treaty that ended the Spanish–American War. The principal territory ceded was the islands of Sibutu and Babuyan.
- Born: T. C. Lethbridge, English archaeologist, explorer and parapsychologist; in Timberscombe, England (d. 1970)
- Died: Konstantin Stoilov, 47, Bulgarian state leader, 8th Prime Minister of Bulgaria

== March 24, 1901 (Sunday) ==
- Shōzō Tanaka apologized to his fellow legislators in the Japanese parliament for outbursts where he implied that the Imperial government was being "run by traitors" and called the Ministry of Agriculture and Commerce "a club of criminals in the pay of" copper mining magnate Furukawa Ichibei (whom Tanaka identified as a major polluter), and called the Ministry of Home Affairs "a pack of hobgoblins". Tanaka, remembered as the first conservationist and environmental activist in Japan, blamed his loss of composure on "brain sickness".
- An assassination plot against Tsar Nicholas was discovered and thwarted. According to reports from France "on the highest authority", but not allowed to be published in Russia, a tunnel had been dug underneath the Tsar's home of Tzarkoe Palace, 17 miles (27 km) south of Saint Petersburg.
- English classical composer Edward Elgar completed writing the Cockaigne Overture.
- La Nación, a newspaper in Buenos Aires, Argentina, broke what appeared to be a major news story about a serum that could immunize people against tuberculosis and potentially heal its effects. Dr. Carlos Villar, known for being an experienced clinical and research physiologist, asserted that his serum "permitted organic rehabilitation" and led to significant improvement in weight, physical vigor and vital capacity. For the next two months, the possible medical breakthrough would be promoted in the press and investigated by the Argentine Medical Association. The physicians would conclude its "healing value was null" and that there was a danger that it could delay treatment that worked.
- The city of Sunnyvale, California, now a major part of the "Silicon Valley", was established. Since the original name, "Murphy", was already in use in what is now Murphys, California, real estate developer W.E. Crossman was forced to rename his planned community on the San Francisco peninsula and chose the name "because traveling either north or south from this sunny area meant running into fog."
- Born: Ub Iwerks, American animator, leading cartoonist for Walt Disney's films; in Kansas City, Missouri (d. 1971)
- Died: Charlotte Mary Yonge, 77, English novelist

== March 25, 1901 (Monday) ==
- Lord Kitchener ordered the entire province of Zululand placed under martial law, and the supplying of rifles and ammunition to the Zulus for their defense against the Boers in the area north of the Thukela River.
- Eighteen people were killed in a tornado at Birmingham, Alabama. The storm struck at 10:00 in the morning and demolished 300 houses. Most of the dead and injured were African Americans living in the southern part of town.
- At a town meeting in Denton, Texas, a proposal passed to created John B. Denton College as a private school to complement North Texas State Normal College. Denton College would become Southwestern Christian College in 1904, then Southland University in 1908, and would depart from Denton entirely in 1909.
- Born:
  - Camilla Wedgwood, British anthropologist, known for her research in New Guinea and Nauru, one of the first British Commonwealth women in that discipline; in Barlaston, England (d. 1955)
  - Raymond Firth, New Zealand anthropologist and ethnologist, co-developer of economic anthropology; in Auckland (d. 2002)
  - William Harding Jackson, American intelligence officer, National Security Advisor to President Dwight D. Eisenhower, third Deputy Director of the Central Intelligence Agency; in Belle Meade, Tennessee (d. 1971)

== March 26, 1901 (Tuesday) ==
- Banco Bilbao Vizcaya, which would merge almost 100 years later with another company to create Spain's megabank BBVA, was founded in the Spanish city of Bilbao, with a capital of 15,000,000 pesetas. At the end of 2015, BBVA's total assets would be €750 million or roughly 125 billion pesetas.
- Future British Prime Minister Neville Chamberlain settled with The Star, a London paper, for 1,500 British pounds sterling (£166,500 in 2016) in a libel suit against and the Star and London newspaper Morning Leader, after the two publications accused him of showing "favoritism in the matter of government contracts".
- The deadline passed for the Chinese government to ratify the March 13 modifications that Russia had insisted upon for control of Manchuria.
- After being excommunicated from the Russian Orthodox Church, Count Leo Tolstoy was banished from the Russian Empire.

== March 27, 1901 (Wednesday) ==
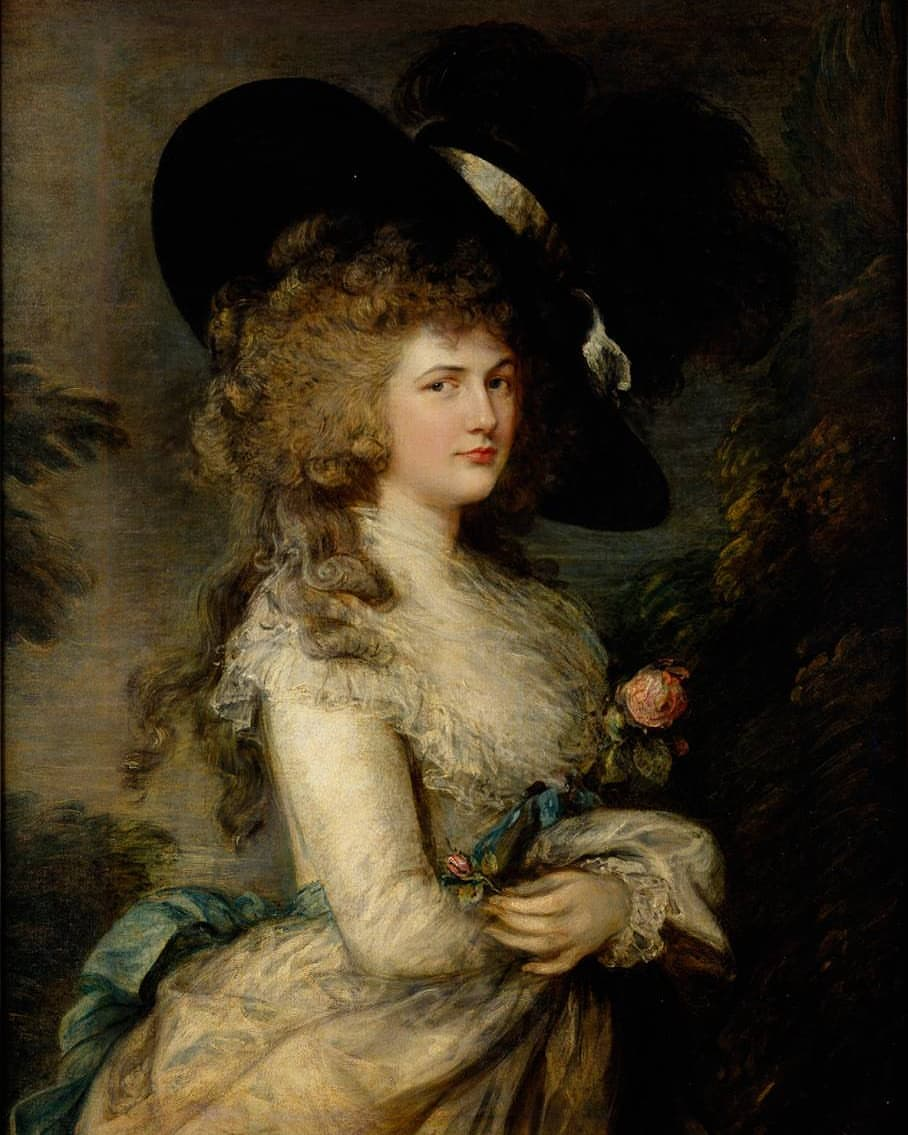
Portrait of Georgiana, Duchess of Devonshire, recovered in Chicago nearly 25 years after it had been stolen

- General Nicolas Capistrano, leader of the Philippine resistance on the island of Mindanao, surrendered to U.S. Army General William Kobbé, after Captain John J. Pershing arranged the meeting. General Capistrano's capitulation took place only days after General Aguinaldo had been captured on the island of Luzon.
- One hundred guns and ammunition were issued to Zulu warriors in the Nqutu and Nkandhla districts of Zululand. The group were put under the command of British Army Colonel H. B. Bottomley, with directions to cross into Boer territory to conduct raids on cattle and livestock. The Zulus were to get 10 percent of any seized property, with the British Army receiving 25%, and the other 65% reserved for Colonel Bottomley's use.
- John Davis Long, the United States Secretary of the Navy, ordered the armored cruiser USS New York (ACR-2) to abandon plans to use force against Morocco in an effort to collect American claims for lost property. The ship had arrived at Mazagran, Algeria, to transport U.S. Consul General Samuel R. Gummeré to Tangier, along with U.S. Navy personnel, to enforce the claims. Instead, the New York was ordered to proceed to the Philippines.
- Portrait of Georgiana, Duchess of Devonshire, painted by Thomas Gainsborough, was recovered in Chicago nearly 25 years after it had been stolen.
- Born:
  - Carl Barks, American cartoonist, credited for expanding the Donald Duck comic strip into a universe of characters; near Merrill, Oregon (d. 2000)
  - Enrique Santos Discépolo, Argentine musician and composer, lead promoter of tango and milonga; in Buenos Aires (d. 1951)
  - Erich Ollenhauer, German politician, leader of the Social Democratic Party of Germany during the 1950s; in Magdeburg, Germany (d. 1963)
  - Eisaku Satō, Japanese state leader, 38th Prime Minister of Japan, recipient of the Nobel Peace Prize; in Tabuse, Japan (d. 1975)
  - Kenneth Slessor, Australian poet; in Orange, New South Wales, Australia (d. 1971)
- Died: Francis E. Dumas, a former American army officer, died in New Orleans. He was an African-American free man of color in Louisiana who had been the highest-ranking black officer in the U.S. military during the early years of the American Civil War. Major Dumas led the Second Regiment of the all-black Louisiana Native Guard. After the end of the war, he continued to operate a successful clothing store in New Orleans, and narrowly lost a bid to become the Governor of Louisiana during the Reconstruction era.

== March 28, 1901 (Thursday) ==
- The Texas Fuel Company was founded in Beaumont, Texas, by Joseph S. Cullinan, the lessee of a large storage tank in Sabine Pass. In 1902, Cullinan would sell the assets of Texas Fuel to his new corporation, The Texas Company, now known as Texaco.
- Kaiser Wilhelm delivered an ominous speech at the dedication of the new Berlin barracks of the Alexander Regiment, calling upon the elite guards' sense of duty, and giving a warning against any repeat of the Prussian Revolution of 1848. Addressing his assembled troops from horseback, and bedecked in his Field Marshal uniform, the Kaiser said, "The Emperor Alexander Regiment is called upon in a sense to stand ready as bodyguard by night and by day, if necessary, to risk its life and its blood for the King and his House; and if ever again the city should presume to rise up against its master, then I have no doubt that the regiment will repress with the bayonet the impertinence of the people toward their king."
- Maurice Barrymore, a famous stage actor, suffered a nervous breakdown during a performance at the Lion Palace on Broadway. In the middle of a monologue he shocked the audience with "a blasphemous attack on the Jews". According to reporters, "The audience sat silent, unable to understand... while Barrymore worked himself up to such an emotional pitch that tears rolled down his face." The next day, his son obtained a court order committing the elder Barrymore to the Bellevue Hospital.
- The two-week impeachment trial of North Carolina Supreme Court chief justice David M. Furches and associate justice Robert M. Douglas ended with the acquittal of both men by the state Senate. A two-thirds majority of the senators (34 out of 50) was required to convict, and 12 Democrats joined Republican senators in voting to acquit. Yes-no votes on the five articles were 23–27, 24–26, 24–26, 25–25 and 16–34.
- Born:
  - Princess Märtha of Sweden, future Crown Princess of Norway; at Arvfurstens palats, Stockholm, Sweden (d. 1954)
  - Jack Weil, American entrepreneur, founder of the Western clothing manufacturer Rockmount Ranch Wear, who continued to serve as its chief executive officer until his death at the age of 107 years old; in Evansville, Indiana (d. 2008)
  - Henry Salvatori, Italian-American conservative political activist and philanthropist; in Tocco da Casauria, Italy (d. 1997)

== March 29, 1901 (Friday) ==
- The imperial government of China informed Russia that it would not sign an agreement for substantial Russian control of Manchuria, due to the opposition of the other foreign powers. "It is China's desire to keep on friendly terms with all nations," the diplomatic note said. "At present she is going through a period which is the most perilous in the Empire's history, and it is necessary that she should have the friendship of all."
- The United Mine Workers obtained recognition by the anthracite mines in Pennsylvania and called off a strike that had been planned for April 1.
- After a meeting with his cabinet, President William McKinley concluded that Colonel Frederick Funston should be promoted to one of the two vacant brigadier general posts in the United States Army.
- Portuguese troops brought 700 Boer prisoners of war to Lisbon after they were shipped from South Africa from Delagoa Bay in the Angola colony.

== March 30, 1901 (Saturday) ==
- The British Army captured Boer Commandant Joachim Prinsloo at Standarton, and obtained the surrender of Commandant Engelbrecht in South Africa.
- Born: Catherine Dorris Norrell, American politician, third woman to gain a seat in the United States House of Representatives (Arkansas, 1961–63) and U.S. Deputy Assistant Secretary of State (1963–65); in Camden, Arkansas (d. 1981)

== March 31, 1901 (Sunday) ==
- An earthquake struck the Black Sea region at 7:10 a.m. local time and registered at 7.2 magnitude, the most powerful ever recorded in the region. The epicenter was 30 km (19 miles) off the coast of Cape Shabla-Kaliakare, Bulgaria, but at a depth of 15 km (9 miles), and caused a tsunami that struck the coast of Bulgaria and Romania.
- The original West End production of the Leslie Stuart and Paul Rubens musical comedy Florodora closed after 455 performances in London.
- By executive order, U.S. President William McKinley created the first two federally-protective wildlife reserves in Alaska for the benefit of reindeer in that territory. The order set aside 75 square miles (190 km^{2}) at Cape Denbigh and 100 square miles (260 km^{2}) at Unalakleet.
