= Great Comet of 1901 =

Non-periodic comet

C/1901 G1 (Viscara) (Great Comet of 1901)
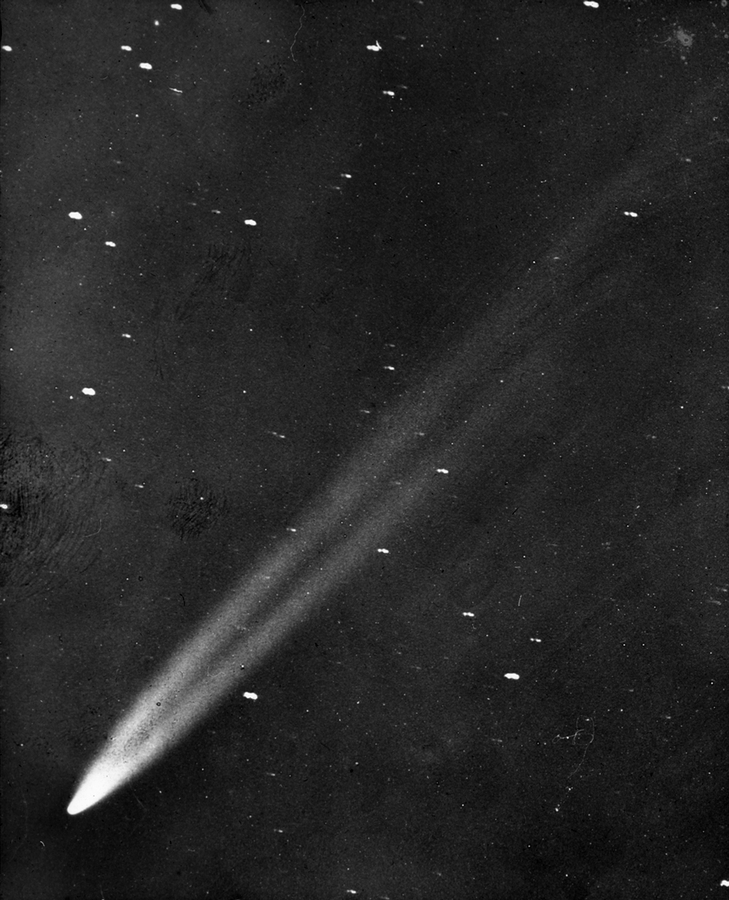
- The Great Comet of 1901 photographed by Edward Emerson Barnard on 11 May 1901

Discovery
- Discovered by: Viscara
- Discovery site: Paysandú, Uruguay
- Discovery date: 12 April 1901

Designations
- Alternative designations: 1901 I, 1901a

Orbital characteristics
- Epoch: 18 May 1901 (JD 2415522.5)
- Observation arc: 42 days
- Number of observations: 54
- Aphelion: ~7,100 AU
- Perihelion: 0.245 AU
- Semi-major axis: ~3,500 AU
- Eccentricity: 0.99993
- Orbital period: ~210,900 years
- Inclination: 131.077°
- Longitude of ascending node: 111.038°
- Argument of periapsis: 203.046°
- Mean anomaly: 0.0001°
- Last perihelion: 24 April 1901
- T_{Jupiter}: –0.402
- Earth MOID: 0.4523 AU
- Jupiter MOID: 0.1551 AU

Physical characteristics
- Mean radius: 4.77 km (2.96 mi) (Note: Calculated mean radius using the formula: $\log_{10}\,(\,R\,)\ =\;0.9 +\;0.13 (\,H\,)$ Where $\,H\,$ is the comet's absolute total magnitude (M1))
- Comet total magnitude (M1): 1.7
- Comet nuclear magnitude (M2): 9.0
- Apparent magnitude: –1.5 (1901 apparition)

The Great Comet of 1901, sometimes known as Comet Viscara, formally designated C/1901 G1 (and in the older nomenclature as 1901 I and 1901a), was a non-periodic comet which became bright in the spring of 1901. Visible exclusively (or almost exclusively) from the Southern Hemisphere, it was discovered on the morning of April 12, 1901 as a naked-eye object of second magnitude with a short tail. On the day of perihelion passage, the comet's head was reported as deep yellowish in color, trailing a 10-degree tail. It was last seen by the naked eye on May 23.

== Discovery and observations ==
In the pre-dawn of 12 April 1901 there was a naked-eye discovery of the comet by Viscara, the manager of an estancia in the Departamento de Paysandú, Uruguay. In the pre-dawn of April 23 the comet was observed in Queenstown, South Africa and on April 24 by David Gill and Robert Innes at the Royal Observatory, Cape of Good Hope; the tail was then about 10° long. On April 24 the comet was also observed at Cape Leeuwin in Western Australia. At the Sydney Observatory on April 25, H. C. Russell found the tail to be about 2° long.

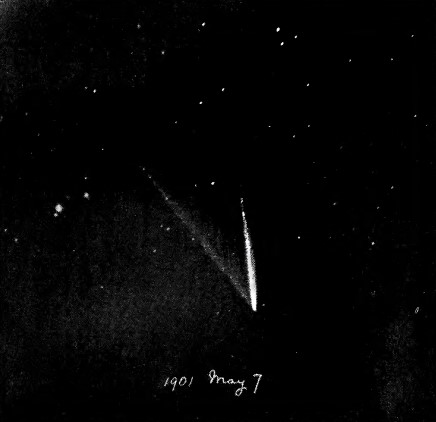
The comet on May 7, 1901.

When the comet's brightness reached a maximum on May 5, the tail had fanned out with a weak plasma tail about 45° long and a curved dust tail about 15° long. On May 5 the comet's brightness reached magnitude 1 or perhaps brighter. According to some observers (of the nucleus viewed telescopically following sunrise) the brightness might have reached magnitude −1.5. From naked-eye observations on May 5 there were at least two reports of aurora-like undulations in the tail.

The comet was readily visible to the naked eye until about May 20 and visible by telescope until October.

== Orbit ==
Using 160 observations over 43 days, Charles J. Merfield (1866–1931) could calculate only a parabolic orbit, inclined about 131° to the ecliptic. The comet travelled in a retrograde orbit relative to the planetary orbits. The comet was on April 10 about .56 AU from Venus and on April 21 about .19 AU from Mercury. On April 24 the comet reached perihelion at about .245 AU from the Sun. On April 30 the comet made its closest approach to planet Earth at about 0.83 AU (124 million km).

== Tebbutt's summary ==
In the section of his Astronomical Memoirs entitled 1901, Tebbutt wrote:

... During the dark hours it was a striking and beautiful object. In addition to the principal or bright tail, a secondary and much longer but fainter one made an angle with it toward the south of about 35 or 40 degrees. Altogether the comet was observed at Windsor on thirty-two evenings. It was seen in the southern hemisphere only, and the only other observatories taking part in the work were the Royal Observatory, Cape Town, the Argentine National Observatory, Cordoba, and the Government Observatory at Perth, Australia. According to the definitive orbit calculated by Mr. Merfield, who also contributed a few observations himself, the comet arrived in perihelion on April 24 at a distance of 23 millions of miles from the sun. At the time of the first Windsor observation, May 3, the comet was distant 79 millions of miles from us, but by June 13, when my last observation was obtained, it had receded to a distance of 193 millions of miles. The orbit is sensibly parabolic. ...
