= 1904 Boston Beaneaters season =

1904 Boston Beaneaters
- League: National League
- Ballpark: South End Grounds
- City: Boston, Massachusetts
- Record: 55–98 (.359)
- League place: 7th
- Owners: Arthur Soden
- Managers: Al Buckenberger

The 1904 Boston Beaneaters season was the 34th season of the Braves franchise.

== Regular season ==
=== Season standings ===
National League
Team	W	L	Pct.	GB	Home	Road
New York Giants	106	47	.693	—	56‍–‍26	50‍–‍21
Chicago Cubs	93	60	.608	13	49‍–‍27	44‍–‍33
Cincinnati Reds	88	65	.575	18	49‍–‍27	39‍–‍38
Pittsburgh Pirates	87	66	.569	19	48‍–‍30	39‍–‍36
St. Louis Cardinals	75	79	.487	31½	39‍–‍36	36‍–‍43
Brooklyn Superbas	56	97	.366	50	31‍–‍44	25‍–‍53
Boston Beaneaters	55	98	.359	51	34‍–‍45	21‍–‍53
Philadelphia Phillies	52	100	.342	53½	28‍–‍43	24‍–‍57

=== Record vs. opponents ===
1904 National League record Sources:
Team	BSN	BRO	CHC	CIN	NYG	PHI	PIT	STL
Boston	—	9–13	9–13	7–15	2–20	11–10–1	8–14	9–13–1
Brooklyn	13–9	—	5–17	8–14	3–19	13–9	7–14–1	7–15
Chicago	13–9	17–5	—	13–8–1	11–11–2	15–7	9–13	15–7
Cincinnati	15–7	14–8	8–13–1	—	10–12–1	16–6	11–11–2	14–8
New York	20–2	19–3	11–11–2	12–10–1	—	17–4–2	12–10	15–7
Philadelphia	10–11–1	9–13	7–15	6–16	4–17–2	—	9–13	7–15
Pittsburgh	14–8	14–7–1	13–9	11–11–2	10–12	13–9	—	12–10
St. Louis	13–9–1	15–7	7–15	8–14	7–15	15–7	10–12	—

=== Notable transactions ===
- August 7, 1904: Doc Marshall was purchased by the Beaneaters from the New York Giants.

=== Roster ===
1904 Boston Beaneaters
Roster
Pitchers: Tom Fisher; Ed McNichol; Togie Pittinger; Joe Stewart; Kaiser Wilhelm; Vic Willis	Catchers: Doc Marshall; Gene McAuliffe; Pat Moran; Tom Needham; Infielders: Ed Abbaticchio; Jim Delahanty; Bill Lauterborn; Fred Raymer; Andy Sullivan; Fred Tenney	Outfielders: George Barclay; Rip Cannell; Pat Carney; Duff Cooley; Phil Geier; Kid O'Hara; Joe Stanley; Jack White	Manager: Al Buckenberger

== Player stats ==
=== Batting ===
==== Starters by position ====
Note: Pos = Position; G = Games played; AB = At bats; H = Hits; Avg. = Batting average; HR = Home runs; RBI = Runs batted in

Pos	Player	G	AB	H	Avg.	HR	RBI
C	Tom Needham	84	269	70	.280	4	19
1B	Fred Tenney	147	533	144	.270	1	37
2B	Fred Raymer	114	419	88	.210	1	27
3B	Jim Delahanty	142	499	142	.285	3	60
SS	Ed Abbaticchio	154	579	148	.256	3	54
OF	Phil Geier	149	580	141	.243	1	27
OF	Rip Cannell	100	346	81	.234	0	18
OF	Duff Cooley	122	467	127	.272	5	70

==== Other batters ====
Note: G = Games played; AB = At bats; H = Hits; Avg. = Batting average; HR = Home runs; RBI = Runs batted in

Player	G	AB	H	Avg.	HR	RBI
Pat Moran	113	398	90	.226	4	34
Pat Carney	78	279	57	.204	0	11
George Barclay	24	93	21	.226	0	10
Bill Lauterborn	20	69	19	.275	0	2
Doc Marshall	13	43	9	.209	0	2
Kid O'Hara	8	29	6	.207	0	0
Joe Stanley	3	8	0	.000	0	0
Jack White	1	5	0	.000	0	0
Gene McAuliffe	1	2	1	.500	0	0
Andy Sullivan	1	1	0	.000	0	0

=== Pitching ===
==== Starting pitchers ====
Note: G = Games pitched; IP = Innings pitched; W = Wins; L = Losses; ERA = Earned run average; SO = Strikeouts

Player	G	IP	W	L	ERA	SO
Vic Willis	43	350.0	18	25	2.85	196
Togie Pittinger	38	335.1	15	21	2.66	146
Kaiser Wilhelm	39	288.0	14	20	3.69	73
Ed McNichol	17	122.0	2	12	4.28	39

==== Other pitchers ====
Note: G = Games pitched; IP = Innings pitched; W = Wins; L = Losses; ERA = Earned run average; SO = Strikeouts

Player	G	IP	W	L	ERA	SO
Tom Fisher	31	214.0	6	16	4.25	84
Pat Carney	4	26.1	0	4	5.81	5

==== Relief pitchers ====
Note: G = Games pitched; W = Wins; L = Losses; SV = Saves; ERA = Earned run average; SO = Strikeouts

Player	G	W	L	SV	ERA	SO
Joe Stewart	2	0	0	0	9.64	1
Jim Delahanty	1	0	0	0	0.00	0
