= 1904 Philadelphia Phillies season =

Major League Baseball season

1904 Philadelphia Phillies
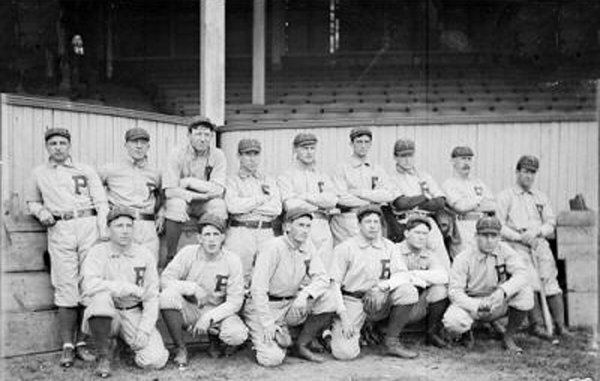
- 1904 Philadelphia Phillies
- League: National League
- Ballpark: National League Park
- City: Philadelphia, Pennsylvania
- Owners: James Potter
- Managers: Hugh Duffy

The following lists the events of the 1904 Philadelphia Phillies season.

== Spring Training ==
In 1904, the Phillies held spring training in Savannah, Georgia. The team practiced and played exhibition games at Bolton Street Park. It was the first season the Phillies trained in Savannah.

=== 1904 Philadelphia City Series ===
The Phillies played eight games against the Philadelphia Athletics for the local championship in the pre-season city series. The Athletics defeated the Phillies, 5 games to 3.

The series was to have opened on April 2, 1904, at the Phillies’ Philadelphia Ball Park but was called off due to wet grounds. The game scheduled for April 9, 1904 at the Phillies’ park was canceled due to rain.

AL Philadelphia Athletics (5) vs. NL Philadelphia Phillies (3)

Game	Date	Score	Location	Time	Attendance
1	April 4, 1904	Philadelphia Phillies – 1, Philadelphia Athletics – 0	Columbia Park	1:25	8,641
2	April 5, 1904	Philadelphia Phillies – 2, Philadelphia Athletics – 4	Columbia Park	1:38	3,701
3	April 6, 1904	Philadelphia Phillies – 6, Philadelphia Athletics – 14	Columbia Park	-	2,643
4	April 7, 1904	Philadelphia Athletics – 4, Philadelphia Phillies – 6	Philadelphia Ball Park	-	3,142
5	April 8, 1904	Philadelphia Athletics – 2, Philadelphia Phillies – 4	Philadelphia Ball Park	1:35	2,311
6	April 11, 1904	Philadelphia Phillies – 0, Philadelphia Athletics – 2	Columbia Park	1:25	1,046
7	April 12, 1904	Philadelphia Athletics – 4, Philadelphia Phillies – 3	Philadelphia Ball Park	1:40	1,379
8	April 13, 1904	Philadelphia Phillies – 8, Philadelphia Athletics – 3	Columbia Park	1:30	714

The Phillies and Athletics had each won 10 of the 20 games between the two teams after the 1904 series,

== Regular season ==
=== Season standings ===
National League
Team	W	L	Pct.	GB	Home	Road
New York Giants	106	47	.693	—	56‍–‍26	50‍–‍21
Chicago Cubs	93	60	.608	13	49‍–‍27	44‍–‍33
Cincinnati Reds	88	65	.575	18	49‍–‍27	39‍–‍38
Pittsburgh Pirates	87	66	.569	19	48‍–‍30	39‍–‍36
St. Louis Cardinals	75	79	.487	31½	39‍–‍36	36‍–‍43
Brooklyn Superbas	56	97	.366	50	31‍–‍44	25‍–‍53
Boston Beaneaters	55	98	.359	51	34‍–‍45	21‍–‍53
Philadelphia Phillies	52	100	.342	53½	28‍–‍43	24‍–‍57

=== Record vs. opponents ===
1904 National League record Sources:
Team	BSN	BRO	CHC	CIN	NYG	PHI	PIT	STL
Boston	—	9–13	9–13	7–15	2–20	11–10–1	8–14	9–13–1
Brooklyn	13–9	—	5–17	8–14	3–19	13–9	7–14–1	7–15
Chicago	13–9	17–5	—	13–8–1	11–11–2	15–7	9–13	15–7
Cincinnati	15–7	14–8	8–13–1	—	10–12–1	16–6	11–11–2	14–8
New York	20–2	19–3	11–11–2	12–10–1	—	17–4–2	12–10	15–7
Philadelphia	10–11–1	9–13	7–15	6–16	4–17–2	—	9–13	7–15
Pittsburgh	14–8	14–7–1	13–9	11–11–2	10–12	13–9	—	12–10
St. Louis	13–9–1	15–7	7–15	8–14	7–15	15–7	10–12	—

=== Roster ===
1904 Philadelphia Phillies
Roster
Pitchers: Tom Barry; John Brackenridge; Ralph Caldwell; Frank Corridon; Bill Duggleby; Chick Fraser; John McPherson; Fred Mitchell; Tully Sparks; Jack Sutthoff	Catchers: Red Dooin; Doc Marshall; Butch Rementer; Frank Roth; Infielders: She Donahue; Klondike Douglass; Jack Doyle; Kid Gleason; Bob Hall; Rudy Hulswitt; Herman Long; Johnny Lush; Jesse Purnell; Harry Wolverton	Outfielders: Shad Barry; Hugh Duffy; Tom Fleming; Sherry Magee; Roy Thomas; John Titus; Deacon Van Buren	Manager: Hugh Duffy

== Player stats ==
=== Batting ===
==== Starters by position ====
Note: Pos = Position; G = Games played; AB = At bats; H = Hits; Avg. = Batting average; HR = Home runs; RBI = Runs batted in

Pos	Player	G	AB	H	Avg.	HR	RBI
C	Red Dooin	108	355	86	.242	6	36
1B	Jack Doyle	66	236	52	.220	1	22
2B	Kid Gleason	153	587	161	.274	0	42
SS	Rudy Hulswitt	113	406	99	.244	1	36
3B	Harry Wolverton	102	398	106	.266	0	49
OF	Roy Thomas	139	496	144	.290	3	29
OF	Sherry Magee	95	364	101	.277	3	57
OF	John Titus	146	504	148	.294	4	55

==== Other batters ====
Note: G = Games played; AB = At bats; H = Hits; Avg. = Batting average; HR = Home runs; RBI = Runs batted in

Player	G	AB	H	Avg.	HR	RBI
Johnny Lush	106	369	102	.276	2	42
Frank Roth	81	229	59	.258	1	20
She Donahue	58	200	43	.215	0	14
Bob Hall	46	163	26	.160	0	17
Shad Barry	35	122	25	.205	0	3
Fred Mitchell	25	82	17	.207	0	3
Hugh Duffy	18	46	13	.283	0	5
Deacon Van Buren	12	43	10	.233	0	3
Doc Marshall	8	20	2	.100	0	1
Jesse Purnell	7	19	2	.105	0	1
Klondike Douglass	3	10	3	.300	0	1
Tom Fleming	3	6	0	.000	0	0
Herman Long	1	4	1	.250	0	0
Butch Rementer	1	2	0	.000	0	0

=== Pitching ===
==== Starting pitchers ====
Note: G = Games pitched; IP = Innings pitched; W = Wins; L = Losses; ERA = Earned run average; SO = Strikeouts

Player	G	IP	W	L	ERA	SO
Chick Fraser	42	302.0	14	24	3.25	127
Bill Duggleby	32	223.2	12	13	3.78	55
Tully Sparks	26	200.2	7	16	2.65	67
Jack Sutthoff	19	163.2	6	13	3.68	46
John McPherson	15	128.0	1	12	3.66	32
Fred Mitchell	13	108.2	4	7	3.40	29
Frank Corridon	11	94.1	6	5	2.19	44
Johnny Lush	7	42.2	0	6	3.59	27
Ralph Caldwell	6	41.0	2	2	4.17	30
Tom Barry	1	0.2	0	1	40.50	1

==== Other pitchers ====
Note: G = Games pitched; IP = Innings pitched; W = Wins; L = Losses; ERA = Earned run average; SO = Strikeouts

Player	G	IP	W	L	ERA	SO
John Brackenridge	7	34.0	0	1	5.66	11
