= 1904 Cincinnati Reds season =

1904 Cincinnati Reds
- League: National League
- Ballpark: Palace of the Fans
- City: Cincinnati, Ohio
- Owners: Garry Herrmann
- Managers: Joe Kelley

The 1904 Cincinnati Reds season was a season in American baseball. The team finished third in the National League with a record of 88–65, 18 games behind the New York Giants.

== Regular season ==
The Cincinnati Reds had made steady improvements over the past two seasons, and were looking to improve even more in 1904, as they were hoping to contend for the National League pennant. The Reds won only 52 games in 1901, however, they improved to 70 in 1902, and 74 in 1903.

Joe Kelley returned for his third season as player-manager of the team, as he took over first base on a permanent basis after Jake Beckley joined the St. Louis Cardinals. Thirty-one-year-old rookie Fred Odwell joined the team after spending the 1903 season with the Louisville Colonels of the American Association, while another rookie Miller Huggins, took over the starting job at second base.

Cy Seymour led Cincinnati with a .313 batting average, while hitting a club high five home runs, and drove in 58 runners. Tommy Corcoran hit only .230, but he managed to hit two home runs and have a club best 74 RBI. Rookie Miller Huggins led the Reds with 96 runs, while he hit .296 with two homers and 30 RBI.

On the mound, Jack Harper had a breakout season, as he won a team high 23 games, while posting a 2.30 ERA in 35 starts. Noodles Hahn had poor run support, as he only had a 16–18 record, however, Hahn had a 2.06 ERA in 35 games, 34 of them starts. Win Kellum and Tom Walker each won 15 games each, with ERA's of 2.60 and 2.24 respectively.

=== Season summary ===
Cincinnati began the season with a mediocre 8–7 record after fifteen games, however, the Reds won their next eight games to move into second place, just half a game behind the first place New York Giants. Cincinnati continues to play good baseball, winning seven of their next ten to improve to 23–11, and take a 1.5 game lead over the Giants and Chicago Cubs for first place in the National League.

The Reds, Giants and Cubs continued their battle for first place going into the month of June, but then the Giants got red hot, and Cincinnati, nor Chicago, could keep up with New York. The Reds had a 13–16 slump to drop their record to 36–27, falling into third place, 11.5 games behind the Giants. As the season went on, the Cubs, Reds and Pittsburgh Pirates battled for second place, but all three teams were well behind New York.

On August 7, the Reds, Giants and Pirates were in a three team deal, which included Cincinnati sending Mike Donlin to New York, while the Reds acquired Jimmy Sebring from Pittsburgh. The team continued playing good baseball for the remainder of the season, finishing with a record of 88–65, good for third place in the National League, 18 games behind the Giants. The Reds 88 wins was their highest since they won 92 games in the 1898 season.

=== Season standings ===
National League
Team	W	L	Pct.	GB	Home	Road
New York Giants	106	47	.693	—	56‍–‍26	50‍–‍21
Chicago Cubs	93	60	.608	13	49‍–‍27	44‍–‍33
Cincinnati Reds	88	65	.575	18	49‍–‍27	39‍–‍38
Pittsburgh Pirates	87	66	.569	19	48‍–‍30	39‍–‍36
St. Louis Cardinals	75	79	.487	31½	39‍–‍36	36‍–‍43
Brooklyn Superbas	56	97	.366	50	31‍–‍44	25‍–‍53
Boston Beaneaters	55	98	.359	51	34‍–‍45	21‍–‍53
Philadelphia Phillies	52	100	.342	53½	28‍–‍43	24‍–‍57

=== Record vs. opponents ===
1904 National League record Sources:
Team	BSN	BRO	CHC	CIN	NYG	PHI	PIT	STL
Boston	—	9–13	9–13	7–15	2–20	11–10–1	8–14	9–13–1
Brooklyn	13–9	—	5–17	8–14	3–19	13–9	7–14–1	7–15
Chicago	13–9	17–5	—	13–8–1	11–11–2	15–7	9–13	15–7
Cincinnati	15–7	14–8	8–13–1	—	10–12–1	16–6	11–11–2	14–8
New York	20–2	19–3	11–11–2	12–10–1	—	17–4–2	12–10	15–7
Philadelphia	10–11–1	9–13	7–15	6–16	4–17–2	—	9–13	7–15
Pittsburgh	14–8	14–7–1	13–9	11–11–2	10–12	13–9	—	12–10
St. Louis	13–9–1	15–7	7–15	8–14	7–15	15–7	10–12	—

=== Roster ===
1904 Cincinnati Reds
Roster
Pitchers: Claude Elliott; Bob Ewing; Noodles Hahn; Jack Harper; Win Kellum; Jack Sutthoff; Tom Walker	Catchers: Peaches O'Neill; Heinie Peitz; Admiral Schlei; Gabby Street; Infielders: Tommy Corcoran; Miller Huggins; Joe Kelley; Harry Steinfeldt; Sam Woodruff	Outfielders: Cozy Dolan; Mike Donlin; Fred Odwell; Jimmy Sebring; Cy Seymour	Manager: Joe Kelley

== Player stats ==
=== Batting ===
==== Starters by position ====
Note: Pos = Position; G = Games played; AB = At bats; H = Hits; Avg. = Batting average; HR = Home runs; RBI = Runs batted in

Pos	Player	G	AB	H	Avg.	HR	RBI
C	Admiral Schlei	97	291	69	.237	0	32
1B	Joe Kelley	123	449	126	.281	0	63
2B	Miller Huggins	140	491	129	.263	2	30
SS	Tommy Corcoran	150	578	133	.230	2	74
3B	Harry Steinfeldt	99	349	85	.244	1	52
OF	Cy Seymour	131	531	166	.313	5	58
OF	Fred Odwell	129	468	133	.284	1	58
OF	Cozy Dolan	129	465	132	.284	6	51

==== Other batters ====
Note: G = Games played; AB = At bats; H = Hits; Avg. = Batting average; HR = Home runs; RBI = Runs batted in

Player	G	AB	H	Avg.	HR	RBI
Sam Woodruff	87	306	58	.190	0	20
Heinie Peitz	84	272	66	.243	1	30
Mike Donlin	60	236	84	.356	1	38
Jimmy Sebring	56	222	50	.225	0	24
Gabby Street	11	33	4	.121	0	0
Peaches O'Neill	8	15	4	.267	0	1

=== Pitching ===
==== Starting pitchers ====
Note: G = Games pitched; IP = Innings pitched; W = Wins; L = Losses; ERA = Earned run average; SO = Strikeouts

Player	G	IP	W	L	ERA	SO
Noodles Hahn	35	297.2	16	18	2.06	98
Jack Harper	34	293.2	23	9	2.30	125
Win Kellum	31	224.2	15	10	2.60	70
Tom Walker	24	217.0	15	8	2.24	64
Bob Ewing	26	212.0	11	13	2.46	99
Jack Sutthoff	12	90.0	5	6	2.30	27

==== Other pitchers ====
Note: G = Games pitched; IP = Innings pitched; W = Wins; L = Losses; ERA = Earned run average; SO = Strikeouts

Player	G	IP	W	L	ERA	SO
Claude Elliott	9	57.2	3	1	2.97	19
