= 1904 Chicago Cubs season =

1904 Chicago Cubs
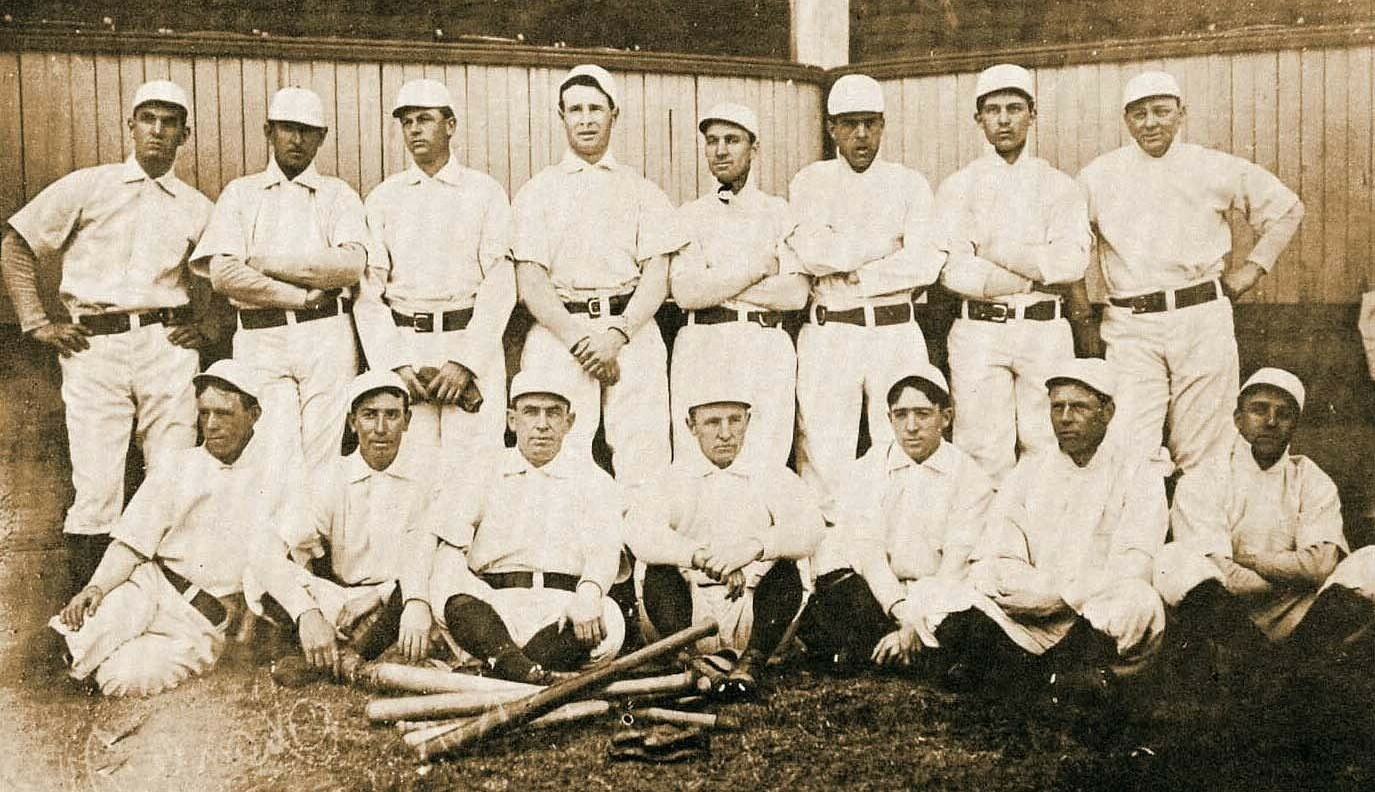
- League: National League
- Ballpark: West Side Park
- City: Chicago
- Record: 93–60 (.608)
- League place: 2nd
- Owners: James Hart
- Managers: Frank Selee

The 1904 Chicago Cubs season was the 33rd season of the Chicago Cubs franchise, the 29th in the National League, and the 12th at West Side Park. The Cubs finished second in the National League with a record of 93–60.

== Regular season ==
=== Season standings ===
National League
Team	W	L	Pct.	GB	Home	Road
New York Giants	106	47	.693	—	56‍–‍26	50‍–‍21
Chicago Cubs	93	60	.608	13	49‍–‍27	44‍–‍33
Cincinnati Reds	88	65	.575	18	49‍–‍27	39‍–‍38
Pittsburgh Pirates	87	66	.569	19	48‍–‍30	39‍–‍36
St. Louis Cardinals	75	79	.487	31½	39‍–‍36	36‍–‍43
Brooklyn Superbas	56	97	.366	50	31‍–‍44	25‍–‍53
Boston Beaneaters	55	98	.359	51	34‍–‍45	21‍–‍53
Philadelphia Phillies	52	100	.342	53½	28‍–‍43	24‍–‍57

=== Record vs. opponents ===
1904 National League record Sources:
Team	BSN	BRO	CHC	CIN	NYG	PHI	PIT	STL
Boston	—	9–13	9–13	7–15	2–20	11–10–1	8–14	9–13–1
Brooklyn	13–9	—	5–17	8–14	3–19	13–9	7–14–1	7–15
Chicago	13–9	17–5	—	13–8–1	11–11–2	15–7	9–13	15–7
Cincinnati	15–7	14–8	8–13–1	—	10–12–1	16–6	11–11–2	14–8
New York	20–2	19–3	11–11–2	12–10–1	—	17–4–2	12–10	15–7
Philadelphia	10–11–1	9–13	7–15	6–16	4–17–2	—	9–13	7–15
Pittsburgh	14–8	14–7–1	13–9	11–11–2	10–12	13–9	—	12–10
St. Louis	13–9–1	15–7	7–15	8–14	7–15	15–7	10–12	—

=== Roster ===
1904 Chicago Cubs
Roster
Pitchers: Buttons Briggs; Mordecai Brown; Frank Corridon; Ernie Groth; Carl Lundgren; Jake Weimer; Bob Wicker	Catchers: Fred Holmes; Johnny Kling; Jack O'Neill; Tom Stanton; Infielders: Doc Casey; Frank Chance; Johnny Evers; George Moriarty; Joe Tinker	Outfielders: Shad Barry; Bill Carney; Solly Hofman; Davy Jones; Jack McCarthy; Harry McChesney; Dutch Rudolph; Wildfire Schulte; Jimmy Slagle; Aleck Smith; Ike Van Zandt; Otto Williams	Manager: Frank Selee

== Player stats ==
=== Batting ===
==== Starters by position ====
Note: Pos = Position; G = Games played; AB = At bats; H = Hits; Avg. = Batting average; HR = Home runs; RBI = Runs batted in

Pos	Player	G	AB	H	Avg.	HR	RBI
C	Johnny Kling	123	452	110	.243	2	46
1B	Frank Chance	124	451	140	.310	6	49
2B	Johnny Evers	152	532	141	.265	0	47
SS	Joe Tinker	141	488	108	.221	3	41
3B	Doc Casey	136	548	147	.268	1	43
OF	Jack McCarthy	115	432	114	.264	0	51
OF	Jimmy Slagle	120	481	125	.260	1	31
OF	Davy Jones	98	336	82	.244	3	39

==== Other batters ====
Note: G = Games played; AB = At bats; H = Hits; Avg. = Batting average; HR = Home runs; RBI = Runs batted in

Player	G	AB	H	Avg.	HR	RBI
Shad Barry	73	263	69	.262	1	26
Otto Williams	57	185	37	.200	0	8
Jack O'Neill	51	168	36	.214	1	19
Harry McChesney	22	88	23	.261	0	11
Frank Schulte	20	84	24	.286	2	13
Frank Corridon	19	58	13	.224	0	1
Aleck Smith	10	29	6	.207	0	1
Solly Hofman	7	26	7	.269	1	4
George Moriarty	4	13	0	.000	0	0
Ike Van Zandt	3	11	0	.000	0	0
Bill Carney	2	7	0	.000	0	0
Fred Holmes	1	3	1	.333	0	0
Tom Stanton	1	3	0	.000	0	0
Dutch Rudolph	2	3	1	.333	0	0

=== Pitching ===
==== Starting pitchers ====
Note: G = Games pitched; IP = Innings pitched; W = Wins; L = Losses; ERA = Earned run average; SO = Strikeouts

Player	G	IP	W	L	ERA	SO
Jake Weimer	37	307.0	20	14	1.91	177
Buttons Briggs	34	277.0	19	11	2.05	112
Carl Lundgren	31	242.0	17	9	2.60	106
Bob Wicker	30	229.0	17	9	2.67	99
Mordecai Brown	26	212.1	15	10	1.86	81
Frank Corridon	12	100.1	5	5	3.05	34

==== Other pitchers ====
Note: G = Games pitched; IP = Innings pitched; W = Wins; L = Losses; ERA = Earned run average; SO = Strikeouts

Player	G	IP	W	L	ERA	SO
Ernie Groth	3	16.0	0	2	5.63	9
