= Philadelphia Phillies all-time roster (B) =

List of baseball players

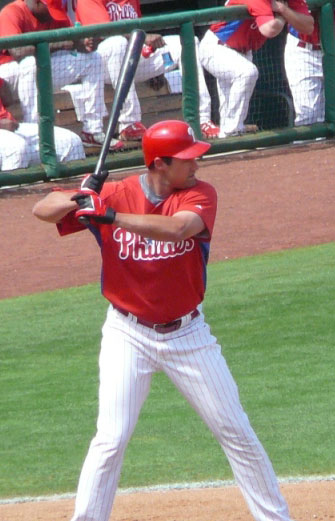
Pat Burrell was a first-round draft pick of the Phillies in 1998 and played for the team from 2000 to 2008.

The Philadelphia Phillies are a Major League Baseball team based in Philadelphia, Pennsylvania. They are a member of the Eastern Division of Major League Baseball's National League. The team has played officially under two names since beginning play in 1883: the current moniker, as well as the "Quakers", which was used in conjunction with "Phillies" during the team's early history. The team was also known unofficially as the "Blue Jays" during the World War II era. Since the franchise's inception, 2,081 players have made an appearance in a competitive game for the team, whether as an offensive player (batting and baserunning) or a defensive player (fielding, pitching, or both).

Of those 2,081 Phillies, 180 have had surnames beginning with the letter B. Four of those players have been inducted into the Baseball Hall of Fame: Dave Bancroft, who played six seasons at shortstop for Philadelphia; Chief Bender, a pitcher with the team for two years; Dan Brouthers, whose career with the Phillies encompassed the 1896 season; and Jim Bunning, the pitcher whose number 14 is the only one retired by the Phillies for a player on this list. Of the four, Bancroft is the only one inducted to the Hall of Fame with the Phillies as his primary team. Bunning and Bender are two of four members of the Philadelphia Baseball Wall of Fame on this list, although Bender was inducted as a member of the Philadelphia Athletics; the others are catcher Bob Boone and shortstop Larry Bowa.

Among the 95 batters in this list, catcher Mack Burk has the highest batting average, at .500; he had one hit in two career plate appearances with Philadelphia. Other players with an average at or above .300 include Henry Baldwin (.313 in one season), Johnny Bates (.301 in two seasons), Beals Becker (.301 in three seasons), Wally Berger (.317 in one season), T. J. Bohn (.400 in one season), Brouthers (.344 in one season), George Browne (.300 in three seasons), Frank Bruggy (.310 in one season), and Smoky Burgess (.316 in four seasons). Pat Burrell leads Phillies players whose names begin with B in home runs, with 251, and runs batted in, with 827.

Of this list's 85 pitchers, Doug Bair and Doug Bird share the best winning percentage with Mark Brownson. Each is undefeated in his decisions—Bair and Bird with 2–0 records, and Brownson at 1–0. The top winner among pitchers whose names begin with B is Bunning, who recorded 89 victories in 6 seasons with Philadelphia. Ray Benge lost 82 games in 6 seasons, the most among these pitchers. Bunning's 1,409 strikeouts are the highest total among B pitchers, and two pitchers (Joe Bisenius and Dan Boitano) share the earned run average (ERA) lead, with a 0.00 mark; among pitchers who have allowed a run, Stan Bahnsen's 1.35 ERA is best. Bunning is one of the ten Phillies pitchers who have thrown a no-hitter, having pitched a perfect game on June 21, 1964.

Key to symbols in player list(s)
† or ‡	Indicates a member of the National Baseball Hall of Fame and Museum; ‡ indicates that the Phillies are the player's primary team^{[H]}
§	Indicates a member of the Philadelphia Baseball Wall of Fame
*	Indicates a team record^{[R]}
(#)	A number following a player's name indicates that the number was retired by the Phillies in the player's honor.
Year	Italic text indicates that the player is a member of the Phillies' active (25-man) roster.
Position(s)	Indicates the player's primary position(s)^{[P]}
Notes	Statistics shown only for playing time with Phillies^{[S]}
Ref	References

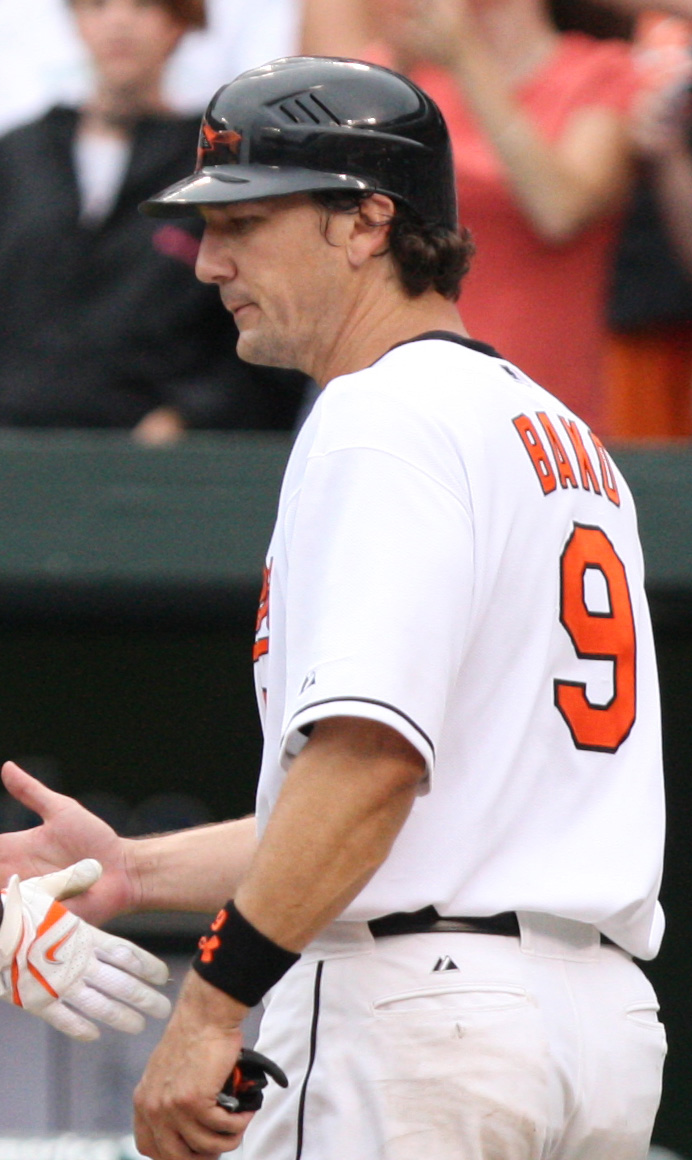
Catcher Paul Bako hit three home runs in his only season with Philadelphia.

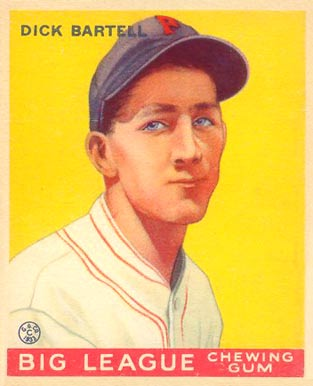
Dick Bartell had a four-year career as the Phillies' shortstop.

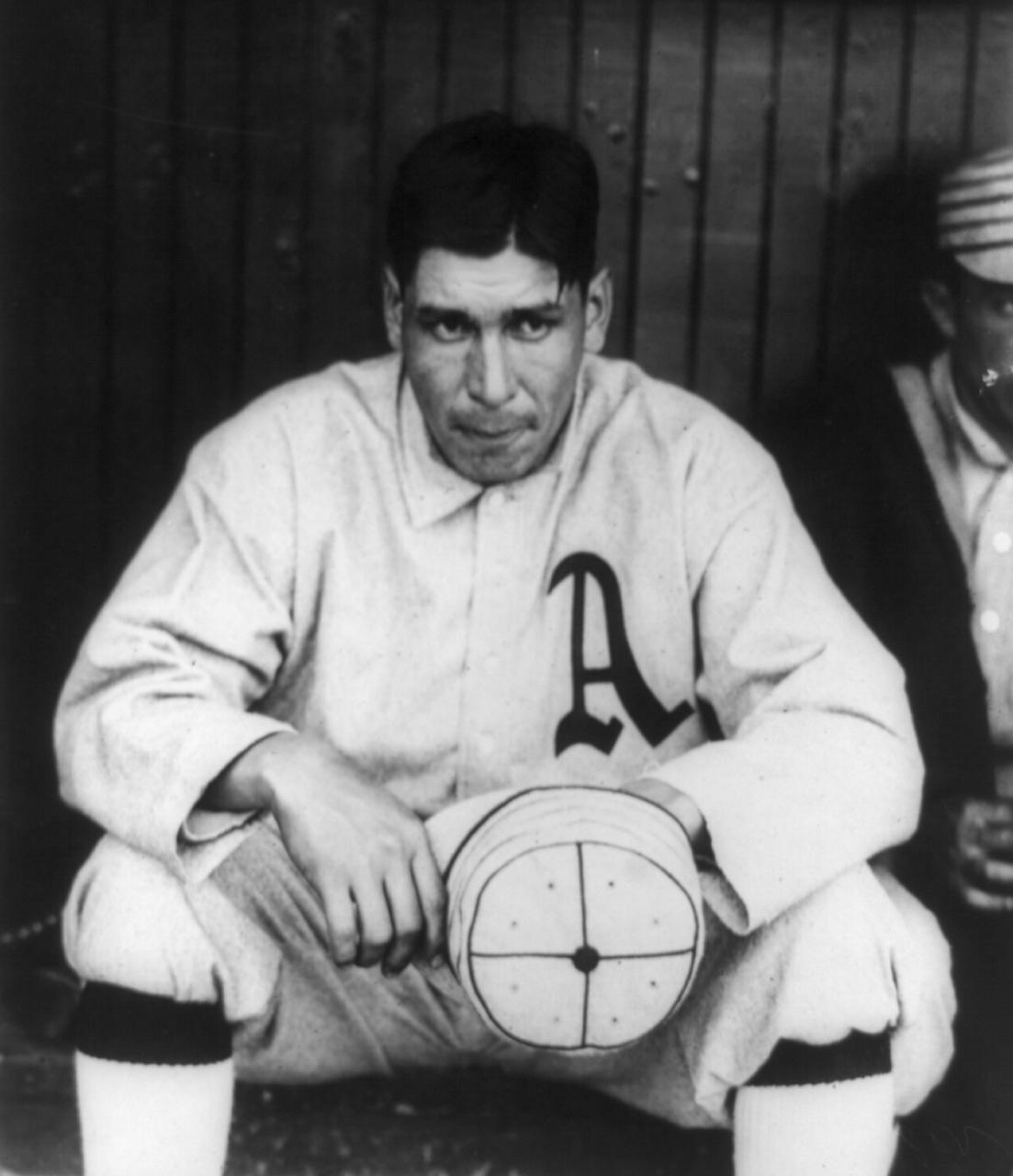
Chief Bender is a member of the Philadelphia Baseball Wall of Fame elected for his tenure with the crosstown Athletics.

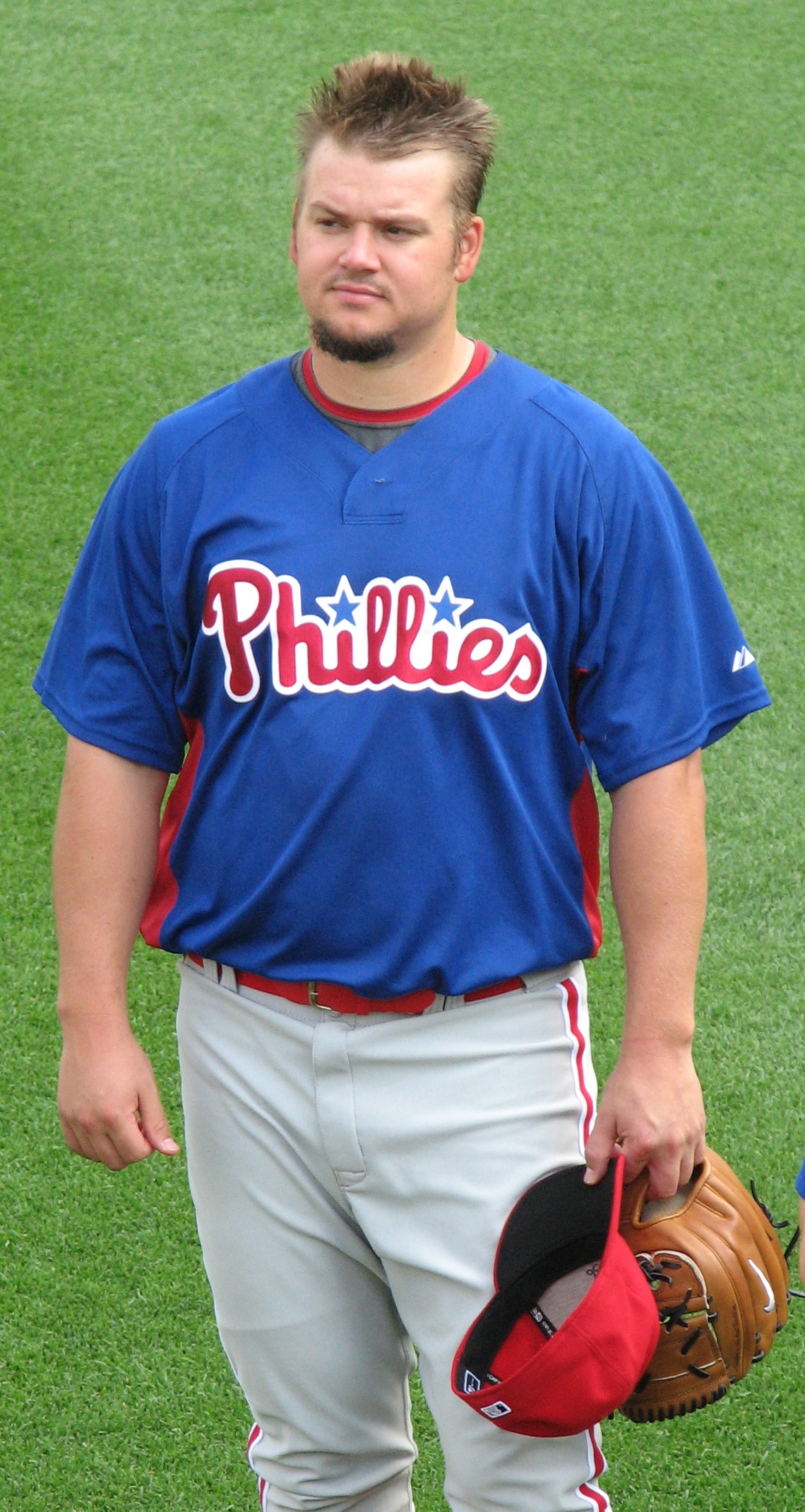
In his first three seasons with the Phillies, pitcher Joe Blanton won 25 games.

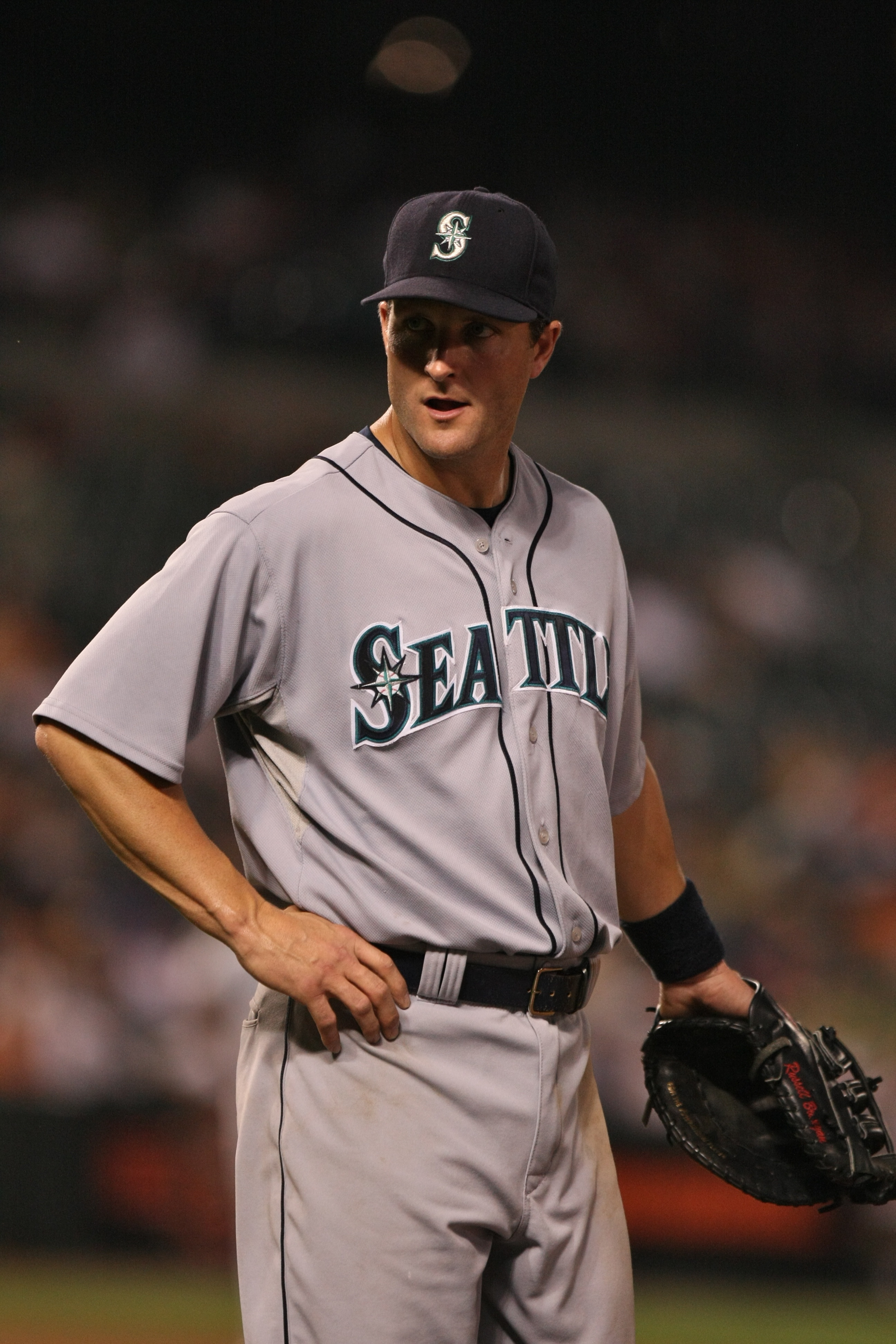
Russell Branyan played two positions for the Phillies (third base and left field) during the 2007 season.

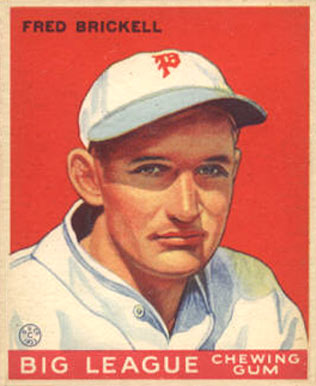
Fred Brickell hit 13 triples in his four seasons with Philadelphia.

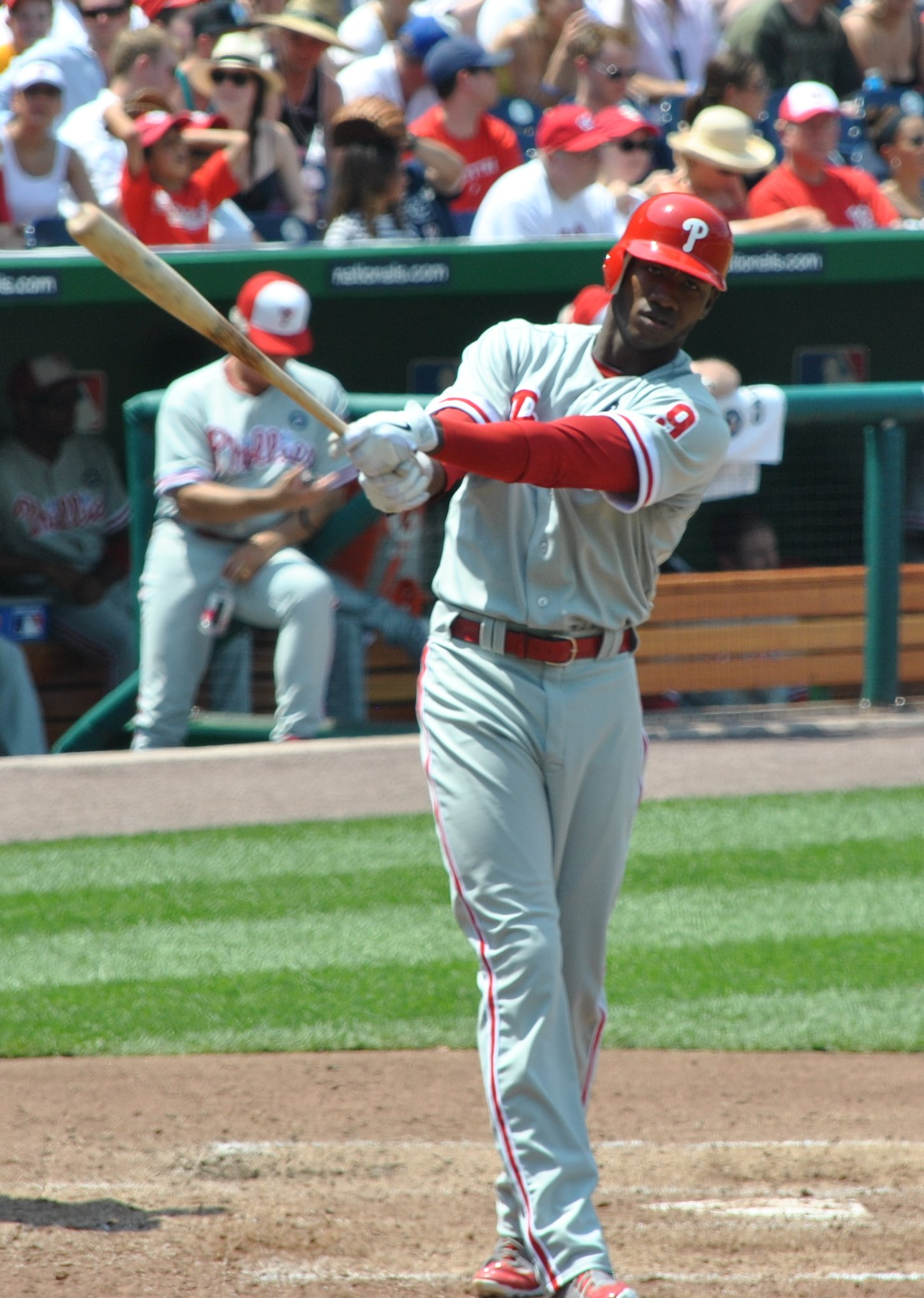
Domonic Brown is expected to platoon as the Phillies' starter in right field beginning in 2011.

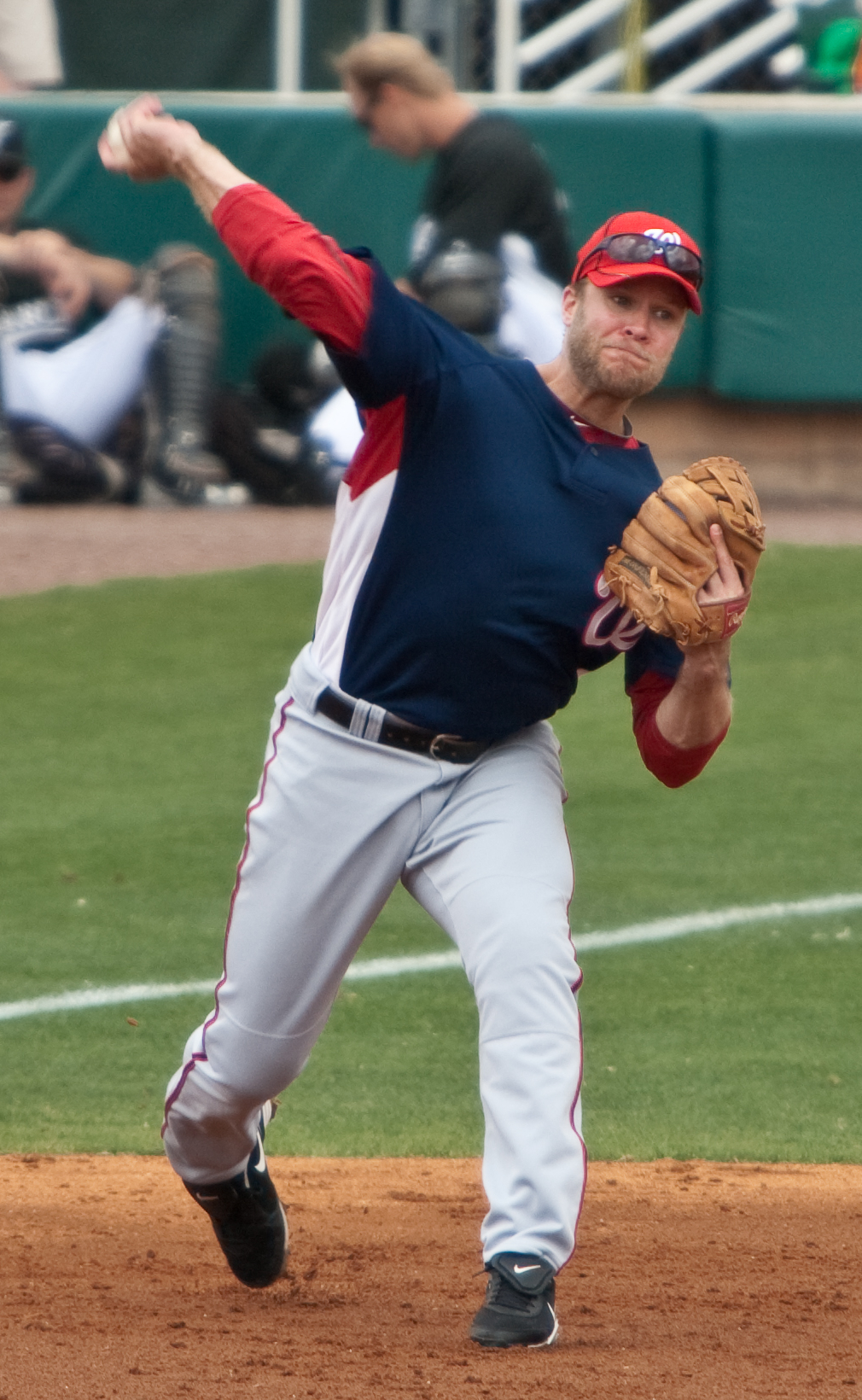
As a Phillie, Eric Bruntlett turned the first game-ending unassisted triple play in National League history.

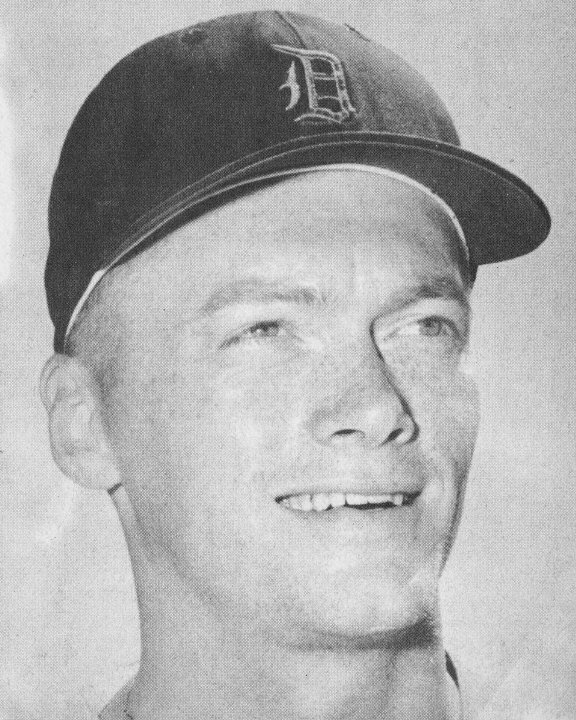
Jim Bunning threw the first perfect game in Philadelphia's franchise history.

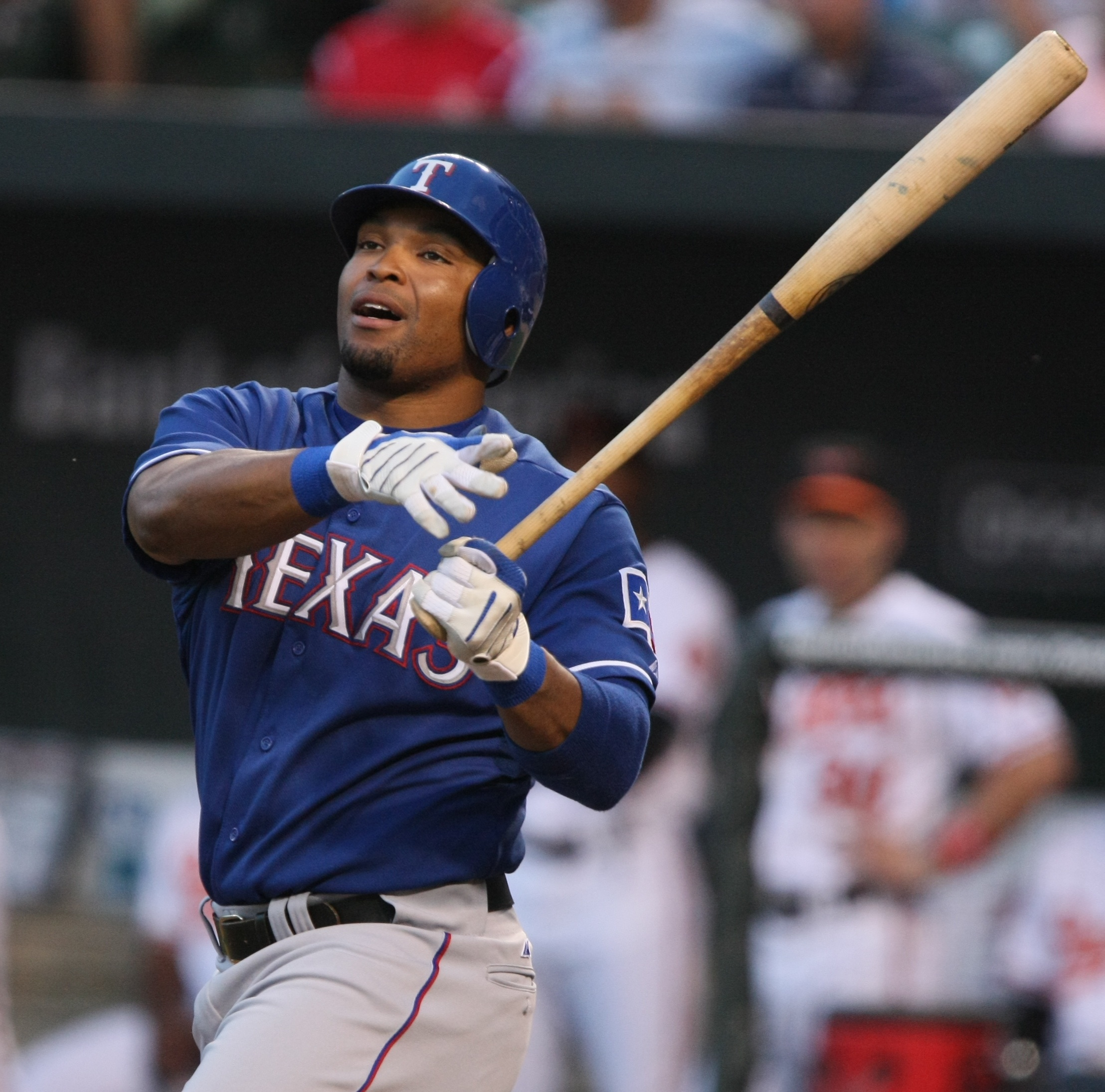
Marlon Byrd played center field for Philadelphia for four seasons.

List of players whose surnames begin with B, showing season(s) and position(s) played and selected statistics
Name	Season(s)	Position(s)	Notes	Ref
Wally Backman	1991–1992	Second baseman Third baseman	.249 batting average; 13 doubles; 21 runs batted in	
Ed Baecht	1926–1928	Pitcher	3–2 record; 6.49 earned run average; 24 strikeouts	
Danys Báez	2010–2011	Pitcher	5–8 record; 5.81 earned run average; 46 strikeouts	
Stan Bahnsen	1982	Pitcher	1.35 earned run average; 9 strikeouts; 3 walks	
Doug Bair	1987	Pitcher	2–0 record; 5.93 earned run average; 10 strikeouts	
Doug Baird	1919	Third baseman	.252 batting average; 2 home runs; 30 runs batted in	
Floyd Baker	1954–1955	Third baseman	.167 batting average; 5 hits; 30 plate appearances	
Paul Bako	2009	Catcher	.224 batting average; 3 home runs; 9 runs batted in	
Jack Baldschun	1961–1965	Pitcher	39–34 record; 3.18 earned run average; 420 strikeouts; 59 saves	
Henry Baldwin	1927	Shortstop; Third baseman	.313 batting average; 5 doubles; 1 run batted in	
Jay Baller	1982; 1992	Pitcher	6.16 earned run average; 16 strikeouts; 12 walks	
Dave Bancroft^{‡}	1915–1920	Shortstop	.251 batting average; 14 home runs; 162 runs batted in	
Alan Bannister	1974–1975	Center fielder	.221 batting average; 3 doubles; 1 run batted in	
Rod Barajas	2007	Catcher	.230 batting average; 4 home runs; 10 runs batted in	
Salomé Barojas	1988	Pitcher	8.31 earned run average; 1 strikeout; 8 walks	
Dick Barrett	1943–1945	Pitcher	30–47 record; 3.93 earned run average; 211 strikeouts	
Tom Barrett	1988–1989	Second baseman	.210 batting average; 1 double; 4 runs batted in	
Tony Barron	1997	Right fielder	.286 batting average; 4 home runs; 24 runs batted in	
Rich Barry	1969	Left fielder	.188 batting average; 1 double; 4 runs scored	
Shad Barry	1901–1904	Right fielder Left fielder	.269 batting average; 5 home runs; 143 runs batted in	
Tom Barry	1904	Pitcher	0–1 record; 2/3 innings pitched; 3 earned runs	
Dick Bartell	1931–1934	Shortstop	.295 batting average; 2 home runs; 161 runs batted in	
Walt Bashore	1936	Center fielder	.200 batting average; 2 hits; 11 plate appearances	
Antonio Bastardo	2009–2011	Pitcher	10–4 record; 3.86 earned run average; 115 strikeouts	
Charlie Bastian	1885–1888; 1891	Second baseman Shortstop	.196 batting average; 8 home runs; 105 runs batted in	
John Bateman	1972	Catcher	.222 batting average; 3 home runs; 17 runs batted in	
Bud Bates	1939	Center fielder	.259 batting average; 1 home run; 2 runs batted in	
Del Bates	1970	Catcher	.133 batting average; 2 doubles; 1 run batted in	
Johnny Bates	1909–1910	Center fielder	.301 batting average; 4 home runs; 76 runs batted in	
Kim Batiste	1991–1994	Third baseman Shortstop	.241 batting average; 7 home runs; 53 runs batted in	
Howard Battle	1996	Third baseman	.000 batting average; 5 plate appearances; 2 strikeouts	
Stan Baumgartner	1914–1916; 1921–1922	Pitcher	6–11 record; 4.52 earned run average; 66 strikeouts	
Frank Baumholtz	1956–1957	Right fielder	.265 batting average; 27 hits; 9 runs batted in	
Ernie Beam	1895	Pitcher	0–2 record; 11.31 earned run average; 3 saves	
Boom-Boom Beck	1939–1943	Pitcher	12–33 record; 4.75 earned run average; 162 strikeouts	
Fred Beck	1911	Right fielder	.281 batting average; 3 home runs; 25 runs batted in	
Beals Becker	1913–1915	Left fielder	.301 batting average; 29 home runs; 145 runs batted in	
Bob Becker	1897–1898	Pitcher	0–2 record; 6.52 earned run average; 10 strikeouts	
Howie Bedell	1968	Pinch hitter^{[a]}	.143 batting average; 1 runs batted in; 7 plate appearances	
Steve Bedrosian	1986–1989	Pitcher	21–18 record; 3.29 earned run average; 241 strikeouts; 103 saves	
Fred Beebe	1911	Pitcher	3–3 record; 4.47 earned run average; 20 strikeouts	
Matt Beech	1996–1998	Pitcher	8–22 record; 5.37 earned run average; 266 strikeouts	
Petie Behan	1921–1923	Pitcher	7–15 record; 4.76 earned run average; 43 strikeouts	
Bo Belinsky	1965–1966	Pitcher	4–11 record; 4.61 earned run average; 79 strikeouts	
David Bell	2003–2006	Third baseman	.258 batting average; 38 home runs; 209 runs batted in	
Juan Bell	1992–1993	Shortstop	.203 batting average; 1 home run; 15 runs batted in	
Chief Bender^{†§}	1916–1917	Pitcher	15–9 record; 2.75 earned run average; 86 strikeouts	
Art Benedict	1883	Second baseman	.267 batting average; 1 double; 4 runs batted in	
Ray Benge	1928–1931; 1936	Pitcher	58–82 record; 4.69 earned run average; 435 strikeouts	
Mike Benjamin	1996	Shortstop	.223 batting average; 4 home runs; 13 runs batted in	
Stan Benjamin	1939–1942	Right fielder	.226 batting average; 5 home runs; 38 runs batted in	
Dave Bennett	1964	Pitcher	9.00 earned run average; 1 inning pitched; 1 strikeout	
Dennis Bennett	1962–1964	Pitcher	30–28 record; 3.48 earned run average; 356 strikeouts	
Gary Bennett	1995–2001	Catcher	.249 batting average; 4 home runs; 36 runs batted in	
Joe Bennett	1923	Third baseman	0 plate appearances; 1.000 fielding percentage; 1 assist	
Joel Bennett	1999	Pitcher	2–1 record; 9.00 earned run average; 13 strikeouts	
Jack Bentley	1926	First baseman	.258 batting average; 2 home runs; 27 runs batted in	
Rabbit Benton	1922	Second baseman	.211 batting average; 1 double; 3 runs batted in	
Wally Berger	1940	Right fielder Left fielder	.317 batting average; 1 home runs; 5 runs batted in	
Jack Berly	1932–1933	Pitcher	3–5 record; 6.28 earned run average; 19 strikeouts	
Adam Bernero	2006	Pitcher	0–1 record; 36.00 earned run average; 2 walks	
Bill Bernhard	1899–1900	Pitcher	21–16 record; 3.97 earned run average; 72 strikeouts	
Joe Berry	1902	Catcher	.250 batting average; 1 run batted in; 5 plate appearances	
Lefty Bertrand	1936	Pitcher	9.00 earned run average; 1 strikeout; 2 walks	
Huck Betts	1920–1925	Pitcher	18–27 record; 4.40 earned run average; 142 strikeouts	
Charlie Bicknell	1948–1949	Pitcher	0–1 record; 6.83 earned run average; 9 strikeouts	
Doug Bird	1979	Pitcher	0–2 record; 5.16 earned run average; 33 strikeouts	
Joe Bisenius	2007	Pitcher	2 innings pitched; 3 strikeouts; 2 walks	
Jim Bishop	1923–1924	Pitcher	0–4 record; 6.39 earned run average; 8 strikeouts	
Jeff Bittiger	1986	Pitcher	1–1 record; 5.52 earned run average; 8 strikeouts	
Jim Bivin	1935	Pitcher	2–9 record; 5.79 earned run average; 54 strikeouts	
Lena Blackburne	1919	Third baseman	.199 batting average; 2 home runs; 19 runs batted in	
Tim Blackwell	1976–1977	Catcher	.250 batting average; 1 run batted in; 8 plate appearances	
Sheriff Blake	1931	Pitcher	4–5 record; 5.58 earned run average; 31 strikeouts	
Cy Blanton	1940–1942	Pitcher	10–20 record; 4.55 earned run average; 103 strikeouts	
Joe Blanton	2008–2011	Pitcher	26–16 record; 4.43 earned run average; 381 strikeouts	
Johnny Blatnik	1948–1950	Left fielder	.258 batting average; 6 home runs; 45 runs batted in	
Buddy Blattner	1949	Second baseman Third baseman	.247 batting average; 5 home runs; 21 runs batted in	
Marv Blaylock	1955–1957	First baseman	.235 batting average; 15 home runs; 78 runs batted in	
Ron Blazier	1996–1997	Pitcher	4–2 record; 5.38 earned run average; 67 strikeouts	
Jimmy Bloodworth	1950–1951	Second baseman First baseman	.203 batting average; 2 doubles; 14 runs batted in	
Joe Boever	1990–1991	Pitcher	5–8 record; 3.30 earned run average; 129 strikeouts	
T. J. Bohn	2008	Left fielder	.400 batting average; 1 double; 3 runs batted in	
Dan Boitano	1978	Pitcher	1 inning pitched; 1 walk; 4 batters faced	
Ed Boland	1934–1935	Right fielder	.247 batting average; 1 double; 9 runs batted in	
Stew Bolen	1931–1932	Pitcher	3–12 record; 5.89 earned run average; 58 strikeouts	
Jim Bolger	1959	Left fielder	.083 batting average; 1 double; 1 run batted in	
Jack Bolling	1939	First baseman	.289 batting average; 3 home runs; 13 runs batted in	
Rod Booker	1990–1991	Shortstop	.223 batting average; 6 doubles; 17 runs batted in	
Bob Boone^{§}	1972–1981	Catcher	.259 batting average; 65 home runs; 456 runs batted in	
John Boozer	1962–1964; 1966–1969	Pitcher	14–16 record; 4.09 earned run average; 282 strikeouts	
Toby Borland	1994–1996; 1998	Pitcher	9–6 record; 3.72 earned run average; 170 strikeouts	
Hank Borowy	1949–1950	Pitcher	12–12 record; 4.24 earned run average; 46 strikeouts	
Rick Bosetti	1976	Center fielder	.278 batting average; 1 double; 3 runs batted in	
Shawn Boskie	1994	Pitcher	4–6 record; 5.23 earned run average; 59 strikeouts	
Ricky Bottalico	1994–1998; 2001–2002	Pitcher	15–25 record; 3.70 earned run average; 361 strikeouts; 78 saves	
Kent Bottenfield	2000	Pitcher	1–2 record; 4.50 earned run average; 31 strikeouts	
Ed Bouchee	1956–1960	First baseman	.280 batting average; 41 home runs; 198 runs batted in	
Michael Bourn	2006–2007	Left fielder	.268 batting average; 6 runs batted in; 19 stolen bases	
Larry Bowa^{§}	1970–1981	Shortstop	.264 batting average; 421 runs batted in; 288 stolen bases	
John Bowker	2011	First baseman Right fielder	.000 batting average; 13 at-bats; 7 strikeouts	
Bob Bowman	1955–1959	Outfielder	.249 batting average; 17 home runs; 54 runs batted in	
Joe Bowman	1935–1936	Pitcher	16–30 record; 4.70 earned run average; 138 strikeouts	
Sumner Bowman	1890	Pitcher	7.88 earned run average; 2 strikeouts; 2 walks	
Jason Boyd	2000	Pitcher	0–1 record; 6.55 earned run average; 32 strikeouts	
Jack A. Boyle	1893–1898	First baseman	.274 batting average; 11 home runs; 304 runs batted in	
Jack B. Boyle	1912	Third baseman	.280 batting average; 1 double; 2 runs batted in	
Gibby Brack	1938–1939	Right fielder Center fielder	.288 batting average; 10 home runs; 69 runs batted in	
John Brackenridge	1904	Pitcher	0–1 record; 5.56 earned run average; 11 strikeouts	
Phil Bradley	1988	Left fielder	.264 batting average; 11 home runs; 56 runs batted in	
King Brady	1905	Pitcher	1–1 record; 3.46 earned run average; 3 strikeouts	
Bobby Bragan	1940–1942	Shortstop	.233 batting average; 13 home runs; 128 runs batted in	
Art Bramhall	1935	Shortstop; Third baseman	.000 batting average; 1 plate appearance; 1.000 fielding percentage	
Bucky Brandon	1971–1973	Pitcher	15–17 record; 4.06 earned run average; 136 strikeouts	
Jackie Brandt	1966–1967	Center fielder	.235 batting average; 1 home run; 16 runs batted in	
Kitty Bransfield	1905–1911	First baseman	.269 batting average; 11 home runs; 105 runs batted in	
Cliff Brantley	1991–1992	Pitcher	4–8 record; 4.25 earned run average; 57 strikeouts	
Jeff Brantley	1999–2000	Pitcher	3–9 record; 5.77 earned run average; 68 strikeouts	
Russell Branyan	2007	Third baseman Left fielder	.222 batting average; 2 home runs; 5 runs batted in	
Roy Brashear	1903	Second baseman	.227 batting average; 3 doubles; 4 runs batted in	
Alonzo Breitenstein	1883	Pitcher	0–1 record; 9.00 earned run average; 2 walks	
Ad Brennan	1910–1913	Pitcher	29–22 record; 2.87 earned run average; 212 strikeouts	
Rube Bressler	1932	Left fielder	.229 batting average; 6 doubles; 6 runs batted in	
Ken Brett	1973	Pitcher	13–9 record; 3.44 earned run average; 111 strikeouts	
Billy Brewer	1997–1999	Pitcher	2–4 record; 6.00 earned run average; 44 strikeouts	
Charlie Brewster	1943	Shortstop	.220 batting average; 2 doubles; 12 runs batted in	
Fred Brickell	1930–1933	Center fielder	.258 batting average; 13 triples; 51 runs batted in	
Johnny Briggs	1964–1971	Center fielder Left fielder	.251 batting average; 52 home runs; 209 runs batted in	
Brad Brink	1992–1993	Pitcher	0–4 record; 3.99 earned run average; 24 strikeouts	
Bill Brinker	1912	Third baseman	.222 batting average; 1 double; 2 runs batted in	
Eude Brito	2005–2006	Pitcher	2–4 record; 5.36 earned run average; 24 strikeouts	
Jack Brittin	1950–1951	Pitcher	6.75 earned run average; 6 strikeouts; 9 walks	
Chris Brock	2000–2001	Pitcher	10–8 record; 4.29 earned run average; 95 strikeouts	
Rico Brogna	1997–2000	First baseman	.265 batting average; 65 home runs; 300 runs batted in	
Dan Brouthers^{†}	1896	First baseman	.344 batting average; 1 home run; 41 runs batted in	
Buster Brown	1907–1909	Pitcher	9–6 record; 2.56 earned run average; 51 strikeouts	
Domonic Brown	2010–2011	Right fielder	.236 batting average; 7 home runs; 32 runs batted in	
Lloyd Brown	1940	Pitcher	1–3 record; 6.21 earned run average; 16 strikeouts	
Ollie Brown	1974–1977	Right fielder Left fielder	.264 batting average; 16 home runs; 82 runs batted in	
Paul Brown	1961–1963; 1968	Pitcher	0–8 record; 6.00 earned run average; 45 strikeouts	
Tommy Brown	1951–1952	Left fielder	.213 batting average; 11 home runs; 34 runs batted in	
William Brown	1891	First baseman	.243 batting average; 20 doubles; 50 runs batted in	
Byron Browne	1970–1972	Right fielder	.237 batting average; 13 home runs; 41 runs batted in	
Earl Browne	1937–1938	Right fielder First baseman	.286 batting average; 6 home runs; 60 runs batted in	
George Browne	1901–1902; 1912	Left fielder	.300 batting average; 8 doubles; 30 runs batted in	
Mark Brownson	2000	Pitcher	1–0 record; 7.20 earned run average; 3 strikeouts	
Frank Bruggy	1921	Catcher	.310 batting average; 5 home runs; 28 runs batted in	
Roy Bruner	1939–1941	Pitcher	0–7 record; 5.74 earned run average; 28 strikeouts	
Eric Bruntlett	2008–2009	Second baseman	.202 batting average; 2 home runs; 22 runs batted in	
Warren Brusstar	1977–1982	Pitcher	18–11 record; 3.23 earned run average; 149 strikeouts	
Dick Buckley	1894–1895	Catcher	.276 batting average; 1 home run; 40 runs batted in	
Charlie Buffinton	1887–1889	Pitcher	77–50 record; 2.89 earned run average; 512 strikeouts	
Bob Buhl	1966–1967	Pitcher	6–8 record; 4.93 earned run average; 60 strikeouts	
Kirk Bullinger	2000	Pitcher	5.40 earned run average; 4 strikeouts; 3 1/3 innings pitched	
Eric Bullock	1989	Right fielder Center fielder	.000 batting average; 1 run scored; 4 plate appearances	
Jim Bunning^{†§} (#14)	1964–1967; 1970–1971	Pitcher	89–73 record; 2.93 earned run average; 1,197 strikeouts	
Fred Burchell	1903	Pitcher	0–3 record; 2.86 earned run average; 12 strikeouts	
Lew Burdette	1965	Pitcher	3–3 record; 5.48 earned run average; 23 strikeouts	
Smoky Burgess	1952–1955	Catcher	.316 batting average; 15 home runs; 139 runs batted in	
Bill Burich	1942; 1946	Shortstop	.284 batting average; 1 double; 7 runs batted in	
Mack Burk	1956; 1958	Catcher	.500 batting average; 1 hit; 2 plate appearances	
Elmer Burkart	1936–1939	Pitcher	1–1 record; 4.93 earned run average; 9 strikeouts	
Bobby Burke	1937	Pitcher	Infinite earned run average; 1 run allowed; 0 innings pitched	
Eddie Burke	1890	Outfielder	.263 batting average; 4 home runs; 50 runs batted in	
Bill Burns	1911	Pitcher	6–10 record; 3.42 earned run average; 47 strikeouts	
Ed Burns	1913–1918	Catcher	.230 batting average; 21 doubles; 64 runs batted in	
George Burns	1925	Left fielder	.292 batting average; 1 home run; 22 runs batted in	
Pat Burrell	2000–2008	Left fielder	.257 batting average; 251 home runs; 827 runs batted in	
Al Burris	1894	Pitcher	18.00 earned run average; 10 runs allowed; 5 innings pitched	
Paul Busby	1941; 1943	Right fielder	.268 batting average; 1 double; 7 runs batted in	
Joe Buskey	1926	Shortstop	.000 batting average; 11 plate appearances; 1 run scored	
Mike Buskey	1977	Shortstop	.286 batting average; 1 triple; 1 run batted in	
Max Butcher	1938–1939	Pitcher	6–21 record; 4.31 earned run average; 56 strikeouts	
Charlie Butler	1933	Pitcher	9.00 earned run average; 2 walks; 1 hit allowed	
Rob Butler	1997	Center fielder Right fielder	.292 batting average; 9 doubles; 13 runs batted in	
John Buzhardt	1960–1961	Pitcher	11–34 record; 4.18 earned run average; 165 strikeouts	
Marlon Byrd	2002–2005	Center fielder	.271 batting average; 13 home runs; 79 runs batted in	
Paul Byrd	1998–2001	Pitcher	22–23 record; 4.79 earned run average; 200 strikeouts	
Bobby Byrne	1913–1917	Third baseman Second baseman	.243 batting average; 1 home run; 60 runs batted in	
Marty Bystrom	1980–1984	Pitcher	24–22 record; 4.24 earned run average; 218 strikeouts	

== Footnotes ==
Key

- ^{H} The National Baseball Hall of Fame and Museum determines which cap a player wears on their plaque, signifying "the team with which he made his most indelible mark". The Hall of Fame considers the player's wishes in making their decision, but the Hall makes the final decision as "it is important that the logo be emblematic of the historical accomplishments of that player's career".
- ^{P} Players are listed at a position if they appeared in 30% of their games or more during their Phillies career, as defined by Baseball-Reference.com. Additional positions may be shown on the Baseball-Reference website by following each player's citation.
- ^{R} Franchise batting and pitching leaders are drawn from Baseball-Reference.com. A total of 1,500 plate appearances are needed to qualify for batting records, and 500 innings pitched or 50 decisions are required to qualify for pitching records.
- ^{S} Statistics are correct as of the end of the 2010 Major League Baseball season.

List

- ^{a} Howie Bedell is listed by Baseball-Reference as a left fielder, but never appeared in a game in the field for the Phillies.
