= 1904 Pittsburgh Pirates season =

1904 Pittsburgh Pirates
- League: National League
- Ballpark: Exposition Park
- City: Allegheny, Pennsylvania
- Owners: Barney Dreyfuss
- Managers: Fred Clarke

The 1904 Pittsburgh (Note: In the early 20th century and earlier, the name of Pittsburgh was spelled with and without the final 'h'.) Pirates season was the 23rd season of the Pittsburgh Pirates franchise; the 18th in the National League.

The Pirates finished fourth in the National League with a record of 87–66.

== Regular season ==
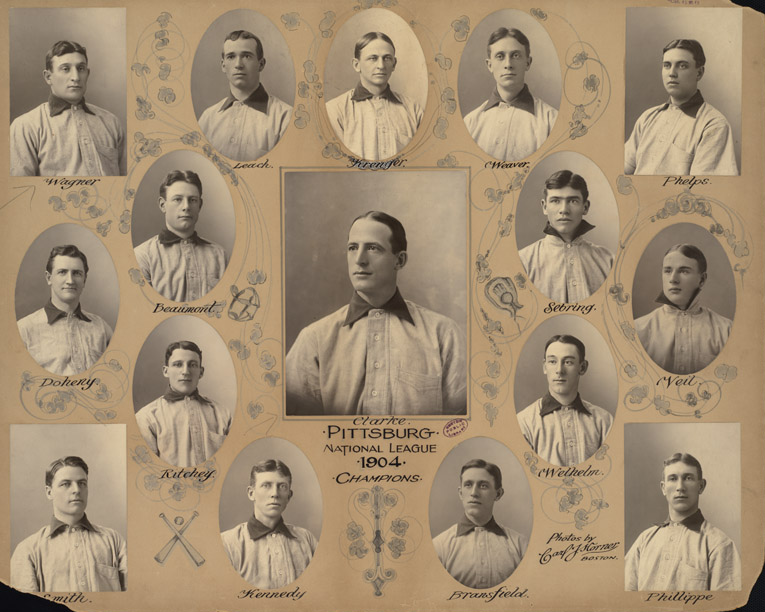
The 1904 Pittsburgh Pirates

=== Season standings ===
National League
| Team | W | L | Pct. | GB | Home | Road |
|---|---|---|---|---|---|---|
| New York Giants | 106 | 47 | .693 | — | 56‍–‍26 | 50‍–‍21 |
| Chicago Cubs | 93 | 60 | .608 | 13 | 49‍–‍27 | 44‍–‍33 |
| Cincinnati Reds | 88 | 65 | .575 | 18 | 49‍–‍27 | 39‍–‍38 |
| Pittsburgh Pirates | 87 | 66 | .569 | 19 | 48‍–‍30 | 39‍–‍36 |
| St. Louis Cardinals | 75 | 79 | .487 | 31½ | 39‍–‍36 | 36‍–‍43 |
| Brooklyn Superbas | 56 | 97 | .366 | 50 | 31‍–‍44 | 25‍–‍53 |
| Boston Beaneaters | 55 | 98 | .359 | 51 | 34‍–‍45 | 21‍–‍53 |
| Philadelphia Phillies | 52 | 100 | .342 | 53½ | 28‍–‍43 | 24‍–‍57 |

=== Record vs. opponents ===
1904 National League record Sources:
| Team | BSN | BRO | CHC | CIN | NYG | PHI | PIT | STL |
|---|---|---|---|---|---|---|---|---|
| Boston | — | 9–13 | 9–13 | 7–15 | 2–20 | 11–10–1 | 8–14 | 9–13–1 |
| Brooklyn | 13–9 | — | 5–17 | 8–14 | 3–19 | 13–9 | 7–14–1 | 7–15 |
| Chicago | 13–9 | 17–5 | — | 13–8–1 | 11–11–2 | 15–7 | 9–13 | 15–7 |
| Cincinnati | 15–7 | 14–8 | 8–13–1 | — | 10–12–1 | 16–6 | 11–11–2 | 14–8 |
| New York | 20–2 | 19–3 | 11–11–2 | 12–10–1 | — | 17–4–2 | 12–10 | 15–7 |
| Philadelphia | 10–11–1 | 9–13 | 7–15 | 6–16 | 4–17–2 | — | 9–13 | 7–15 |
| Pittsburgh | 14–8 | 14–7–1 | 13–9 | 11–11–2 | 10–12 | 13–9 | — | 12–10 |
| St. Louis | 13–9–1 | 15–7 | 7–15 | 8–14 | 7–15 | 15–7 | 10–12 | — |

=== Roster ===
1904 Pittsburgh Pirates
Roster
| Pitchers: Howie Camnitz; Charlie Case; Patsy Flaherty; Watty Lee; Sam Leever; Mike Lynch; Roscoe Miller; Lew Moren; Jack Pfiester; Deacon Phillippe; Chick Robitaille; Doc Scanlan; Bucky Veil | Catchers: Jimmy Archer; Fred Carisch; Ed Phelps; Jack Rafter; Harry Smith; Infielders: Kitty Bransfield; Tommy Leach; Claude Ritchey; Tom Stankard; Honus Wagner | Outfielders: Ginger Beaumont; Harry Cassady; Fred Clarke; Ernie Diehl; Jack Gilbert; Otto Krueger; Moose McCormick; Jimmy Sebring; Bull Smith; Other batters: Bobby Lowe | Manager: Fred Clarke |

== Player stats ==
=== Batting ===
==== Starters by position ====
Note: Pos = Position; G = Games played; AB = At bats; H = Hits; Avg. = Batting average; HR = Home runs; RBI = Runs batted in

| Pos | Player | G | AB | H | Avg. | HR | RBI |
|---|---|---|---|---|---|---|---|
| C | Ed Phelps | 94 | 302 | 73 | .242 | 0 | 28 |
| 1B | Kitty Bransfield | 139 | 520 | 116 | .223 | 0 | 60 |
| 2B | Claude Ritchey | 156 | 544 | 143 | .263 | 0 | 51 |
| SS | Honus Wagner | 132 | 490 | 171 | .349 | 4 | 75 |
| 3B | Tommy Leach | 146 | 579 | 149 | .257 | 2 | 56 |
| OF | Fred Clarke | 72 | 278 | 85 | .306 | 0 | 25 |
| OF | Ginger Beaumont | 153 | 615 | 185 | .301 | 3 | 54 |
| OF | Jimmy Sebring | 80 | 305 | 82 | .269 | 0 | 32 |

==== Other batters ====
Note: G = Games played; AB = At bats; H = Hits; Avg. = Batting average; HR = Home runs; RBI = Runs batted in

| Player | G | AB | H | Avg. | HR | RBI |
|---|---|---|---|---|---|---|
| Otto Krueger | 86 | 268 | 52 | .194 | 1 | 26 |
| Moose McCormick | 66 | 238 | 69 | .290 | 2 | 23 |
| Harry Smith | 47 | 141 | 35 | .248 | 0 | 18 |
| Fred Carisch | 37 | 125 | 31 | .248 | 0 | 8 |
| Jack Gilbert | 25 | 87 | 21 | .241 | 0 | 3 |
| Harry Cassady | 12 | 44 | 9 | .205 | 0 | 3 |
| Bull Smith | 13 | 42 | 6 | .143 | 0 | 1 |
| Ernie Diehl | 12 | 37 | 6 | .162 | 0 | 4 |
| Jimmy Archer | 7 | 20 | 3 | .150 | 0 | 1 |
| Jack Rafter | 1 | 3 | 0 | .000 | 0 | 0 |
| Tom Stankard | 2 | 2 | 0 | .000 | 0 | 0 |
| Bobby Lowe | 1 | 1 | 0 | .000 | 0 | 0 |

=== Pitching ===
==== Starting pitchers ====
Note: G = Games pitched; IP = Innings pitched; W = Wins; L = Losses; ERA = Earned run average; SO = Strikeouts

| Player | G | IP | W | L | ERA | SO |
|---|---|---|---|---|---|---|
| Sam Leever | 34 | 253.1 | 18 | 11 | 2.17 | 63 |
| Patsy Flaherty | 29 | 242.0 | 19 | 9 | 2.05 | 54 |
| Mike Lynch | 27 | 222.2 | 15 | 11 | 2.71 | 95 |
| Deacon Phillippe | 21 | 166.2 | 10 | 10 | 3.24 | 82 |
| Charlie Case | 18 | 141.0 | 10 | 5 | 2.94 | 49 |
| Roscoe Miller | 19 | 134.1 | 7 | 7 | 3.35 | 35 |
| Chick Robitaille | 9 | 66.0 | 4 | 3 | 1.91 | 34 |
| Bucky Veil | 1 | 4.2 | 0 | 0 | 5.79 | 1 |

==== Other pitchers ====
Note: G = Games pitched; IP = Innings pitched; W = Wins; L = Losses; ERA = Earned run average; SO = Strikeouts

| Player | G | IP | W | L | ERA | SO |
|---|---|---|---|---|---|---|
| Howie Camnitz | 10 | 45.0 | 1 | 4 | 4.22 | 21 |
| Watty Lee | 5 | 22.2 | 1 | 2 | 8.74 | 5 |
| Doc Scanlan | 4 | 22.0 | 1 | 3 | 4.91 | 10 |
| Jack Pfiester | 3 | 20.0 | 1 | 1 | 7.20 | 6 |

==== Relief pitchers ====
Note: G = Games pitched; W = Wins; L = Losses; SV = Saves; ERA = Earned run average; SO = Strikeouts

| Player | G | W | L | SV | ERA | SO |
|---|---|---|---|---|---|---|
| Lew Moren | 1 | 0 | 0 | 0 | 9.00 | 0 |
