= 1904 Brooklyn Superbas season =

1904 Brooklyn Superbas
- League: National League
- Ballpark: Washington Park
- City: Brooklyn, New York
- Record: 56–97 (.366)
- League place: 6th
- Owners: Charles Ebbets, Ferdinand Abell, Harry Von der Horst, Ned Hanlon
- President: Charles Ebbets
- Managers: Ned Hanlon

The 1904 Brooklyn Superbas finished in sixth place with a 56–97 record.

== Offseason ==
- December 12, 1903: Bill Dahlen was traded by the Superbas to the New York Giants for Charlie Babb, Jack Cronin and cash.
- January 16, 1904: Bill Bergen was purchased by the Superbas from the Cincinnati Reds.
- March 1904: Ed Poole was purchased by the Superbas from the Cincinnati Reds.

== Regular season ==
=== Season standings ===
National League
Team	W	L	Pct.	GB	Home	Road
New York Giants	106	47	.693	—	56‍–‍26	50‍–‍21
Chicago Cubs	93	60	.608	13	49‍–‍27	44‍–‍33
Cincinnati Reds	88	65	.575	18	49‍–‍27	39‍–‍38
Pittsburgh Pirates	87	66	.569	19	48‍–‍30	39‍–‍36
St. Louis Cardinals	75	79	.487	31½	39‍–‍36	36‍–‍43
Brooklyn Superbas	56	97	.366	50	31‍–‍44	25‍–‍53
Boston Beaneaters	55	98	.359	51	34‍–‍45	21‍–‍53
Philadelphia Phillies	52	100	.342	53½	28‍–‍43	24‍–‍57

=== Record vs. opponents ===
1904 National League record Sources:
Team	BSN	BRO	CHC	CIN	NYG	PHI	PIT	STL
Boston	—	9–13	9–13	7–15	2–20	11–10–1	8–14	9–13–1
Brooklyn	13–9	—	5–17	8–14	3–19	13–9	7–14–1	7–15
Chicago	13–9	17–5	—	13–8–1	11–11–2	15–7	9–13	15–7
Cincinnati	15–7	14–8	8–13–1	—	10–12–1	16–6	11–11–2	14–8
New York	20–2	19–3	11–11–2	12–10–1	—	17–4–2	12–10	15–7
Philadelphia	10–11–1	9–13	7–15	6–16	4–17–2	—	9–13	7–15
Pittsburgh	14–8	14–7–1	13–9	11–11–2	10–12	13–9	—	12–10
St. Louis	13–9–1	15–7	7–15	8–14	7–15	15–7	10–12	—

=== Notable transactions ===
- April 30, 1904: Jack Doyle and Deacon Van Buren were purchased from the Superbas by the Philadelphia Phillies.
- August 1, 1904: Doc Scanlan was purchased by the Superbas from the Pittsburgh Pirates.
- August 27: Fred Mitchell was purchased by the Superbas from the Philadelphia Phillies.

=== Roster ===
1904 Brooklyn Superbas
Roster
Pitchers: Jack Cronin; Jack Doscher; Bull Durham; Ned Garvin; Oscar Jones; Joe Koukalik; Fred Mitchell; Ed Poole; Bill Reidy; Doc Reisling; Doc Scanlan; Grant Thatcher	Catchers: Bill Bergen; Lew Ritter; Infielders: Charlie Babb; Emil Batch; Pop Dillon; Jack Doyle; Fred Jacklitsch; Dutch Jordan; Charlie Loudenslager; Mike McCormick; Sammy Strang	Outfielders: John Dobbs; Doc Gessler; Harry Lumley; Jimmy Sheckard; Other batters: Deacon Van Buren	Manager: Ned Hanlon

== Player stats ==
=== Batting ===
==== Starters by position ====
Note: Pos = Position; G = Games played; AB = At bats; R = Runs; H = Hits; Avg. = Batting average; HR = Home runs; RBI = Runs batted in; SB = Stolen bases

Pos	Player	G	AB	R	H	Avg.	HR	RBI	SB
C	Bill Bergen	96	329	17	60	.182	0	12	3
1B	Pop Dillon	135	511	60	132	.258	0	31	13
2B	Dutch Jordan	87	252	21	45	.179	0	19	7
3B	Mike McCormick	105	347	28	64	.184	0	27	22
SS	Charlie Babb	151	521	49	138	.265	0	53	34
OF	Harry Lumley	150	577	79	161	.279	9	78	30
OF	Jimmy Sheckard	143	507	70	121	.239	1	46	21
OF	John Dobbs	101	363	36	90	.248	0	30	11

==== Other batters ====
Note: G = Games played; AB = At bats; R = Runs; H = Hits; Avg. = Batting average; HR = Home runs; RBI = Runs batted in; SB = Stolen bases

Player	G	AB	R	H	Avg.	HR	RBI	SB
Doc Gessler	104	341	41	99	.290	2	28	13
Sammy Strang	77	271	28	52	.192	1	9	16
Lew Ritter	72	214	23	53	.248	0	19	17
Emil Batch	28	94	9	24	.255	2	7	6
Fred Jacklitsch	26	77	8	18	.234	0	8	7
Bill Reidy	11	32	2	5	.156	0	1	0
Jack Doyle	8	22	2	5	.227	0	2	1
Charlie Loudenslager	1	2	0	0	.000	0	0	0
Deacon Van Buren	1	1	0	1	1.000	0	0	0

=== Pitching ===
==== Starting pitchers ====
Note: G = Games pitched; GS = Games started; IP = Innings pitched; W = Wins; L = Losses; ERA = Earned run average; BB = Bases on balls; SO = Strikeouts; CG = Complete games

Player	G	GS	IP	W	L	ERA	BB	SO	CG
Oscar Jones	46	41	377.0	17	25	2.75	92	96	38
Jack Cronin	40	33	307.0	12	23	2.70	79	110	33
Ned Garvin	23	22	181.2	5	15	1.68	78	86	16
Ed Poole	25	23	178.0	8	14	3.39	74	67	19
Doc Scanlan	13	12	104.0	6	6	2.16	40	40	11
Fred Mitchell	8	8	66.0	2	5	3.82	23	16	8
Doc Reisling	7	7	51.0	3	4	2.12	10	19	6
Bull Durham	2	2	11.0	2	0	3.27	5	1	1
Joe Koukalik	1	1	8.0	0	1	1.13	4	1	1

==== Other pitchers ====
Note: G = Games pitched; GS = Games started; IP = Innings pitched; W = Wins; L = Losses; ERA = Earned run average; BB = Bases on balls; SO = Strikeouts; CG = Complete games

Player	G	GS	IP	W	L	ERA	BB	SO	CG
Bill Reidy	6	4	38.1	0	4	4.46	6	11	2

==== Relief pitchers ====
Note: G = Games pitched; IP = Innings pitched; W = Wins; L = Losses; SV = Saves; ERA = Earned run average; BB = Bases on balls; SO = Strikeouts

Player	G	IP	W	L	SV	ERA	BB	SO
Grant Thatcher	1	9.0	1	0	0	4.00	2	4
Jack Doscher	2	6.1	0	0	0	0.00	1	2
