= 1904 St. Louis Cardinals season =

Major League Baseball season

1904 St. Louis Cardinals
- League: National League
- Ballpark: League Park
- City: St. Louis, Missouri
- Record: 75–79 (48.7%)
- League place: 5th
- Owners: Frank Robison and Stanley Robison
- Manager: Kid Nichols

The 1904 St. Louis Cardinals season was the team's 23rd season in St. Louis, Missouri and its 13th season in the National League. The Cardinals went 75 wins and 79 losses during the season and finished 5th place in the National League.

== Regular season ==
=== Season standings ===
National League
| Team | W | L | Pct. | GB | Home | Road |
|---|---|---|---|---|---|---|
| New York Giants | 106 | 47 | .693 | — | 56‍–‍26 | 50‍–‍21 |
| Chicago Cubs | 93 | 60 | .608 | 13 | 49‍–‍27 | 44‍–‍33 |
| Cincinnati Reds | 88 | 65 | .575 | 18 | 49‍–‍27 | 39‍–‍38 |
| Pittsburgh Pirates | 87 | 66 | .569 | 19 | 48‍–‍30 | 39‍–‍36 |
| St. Louis Cardinals | 75 | 79 | .487 | 31½ | 39‍–‍36 | 36‍–‍43 |
| Brooklyn Superbas | 56 | 97 | .366 | 50 | 31‍–‍44 | 25‍–‍53 |
| Boston Beaneaters | 55 | 98 | .359 | 51 | 34‍–‍45 | 21‍–‍53 |
| Philadelphia Phillies | 52 | 100 | .342 | 53½ | 28‍–‍43 | 24‍–‍57 |

=== Record vs. opponents ===
1904 National League record Sources:
| Team | BSN | BRO | CHC | CIN | NYG | PHI | PIT | STL |
|---|---|---|---|---|---|---|---|---|
| Boston | — | 9–13 | 9–13 | 7–15 | 2–20 | 11–10–1 | 8–14 | 9–13–1 |
| Brooklyn | 13–9 | — | 5–17 | 8–14 | 3–19 | 13–9 | 7–14–1 | 7–15 |
| Chicago | 13–9 | 17–5 | — | 13–8–1 | 11–11–2 | 15–7 | 9–13 | 15–7 |
| Cincinnati | 15–7 | 14–8 | 8–13–1 | — | 10–12–1 | 16–6 | 11–11–2 | 14–8 |
| New York | 20–2 | 19–3 | 11–11–2 | 12–10–1 | — | 17–4–2 | 12–10 | 15–7 |
| Philadelphia | 10–11–1 | 9–13 | 7–15 | 6–16 | 4–17–2 | — | 9–13 | 7–15 |
| Pittsburgh | 14–8 | 14–7–1 | 13–9 | 11–11–2 | 10–12 | 13–9 | — | 12–10 |
| St. Louis | 13–9–1 | 15–7 | 7–15 | 8–14 | 7–15 | 15–7 | 10–12 | — |

=== Roster ===
1904 St. Louis Cardinals
Roster
| Pitchers: Joe Corbett; Chappie McFarland; Jim McGinley; Kid Nichols; Mike O'Neill; War Sanders; Jack Taylor | Catchers: John Butler; Bill Byers; Mike Grady; Larry McLean; Charlie Swindells; Dave Zearfoss; Infielders: Jake Beckley; Dave Brain; Jimmy Burke; She Donahue; John Farrell; Simmy Murch; Danny Shay | Outfielders: George Barclay; Jack Dunleavy; Hugh Hill; Spike Shannon; Homer Smoot | Manager: Kid Nichols |

== Player stats ==
=== Batting ===
==== Starters by position ====
Note: Pos = Position; G = Games played; AB = At bats; H = Hits; Avg. = Batting average; HR = Home runs; RBI = Runs batted in

| Pos | Player | G | AB | H | Avg. | HR | RBI |
|---|---|---|---|---|---|---|---|
| C | Mike Grady | 101 | 323 | 101 | .313 | 5 | 43 |
| 1B | Jake Beckley | 142 | 551 | 179 | .325 | 1 | 67 |
| 2B | John Farrell | 131 | 509 | 130 | .255 | 0 | 20 |
| SS | Danny Shay | 99 | 340 | 87 | .256 | 1 | 18 |
| 3B | Jimmy Burke | 118 | 406 | 92 | .227 | 0 | 37 |
| OF | Homer Smoot | 137 | 520 | 146 | .281 | 3 | 66 |
| OF | Spike Shannon | 134 | 500 | 140 | .280 | 1 | 26 |
| OF | George Barclay | 103 | 375 | 75 | .200 | 1 | 28 |

==== Other batters ====
Note: G = Games played; AB = At bats; H = Hits; Avg. = Batting average; HR = Home runs; RBI = Runs batted in

| Player | G | AB | H | Avg. | HR | RBI |
|---|---|---|---|---|---|---|
| Dave Brain | 127 | 488 | 130 | .266 | 7 | 72 |
| Jack Dunleavy | 51 | 172 | 40 | .233 | 1 | 14 |
| Hugh Hill | 23 | 93 | 21 | .226 | 3 | 4 |
| Larry McLean | 27 | 84 | 14 | .167 | 0 | 4 |
| Dave Zearfoss | 27 | 80 | 17 | .213 | 0 | 9 |
| Bill Byers | 19 | 60 | 13 | .217 | 0 | 4 |
| Simmy Murch | 13 | 51 | 7 | .137 | 0 | 1 |
| John Butler | 12 | 37 | 6 | .162 | 0 | 1 |
| She Donahue | 4 | 15 | 4 | .267 | 0 | 2 |
| Charlie Swindells | 3 | 8 | 1 | .125 | 0 | 0 |

=== Pitching ===
==== Starting pitchers ====
Note: G = Games pitched; IP = Innings pitched; W = Wins; L = Losses; ERA = Earned run average; SO = Strikeouts

| Player | G | IP | W | L | ERA | SO |
|---|---|---|---|---|---|---|
| Jack Taylor | 41 | 352.0 | 20 | 19 | 2.22 | 103 |
| Kid Nichols | 36 | 317.0 | 21 | 13 | 2.02 | 134 |
| Chappie McFarland | 32 | 269.1 | 14 | 18 | 3.21 | 111 |
| Mike O'Neill | 25 | 220.0 | 10 | 14 | 2.09 | 68 |
| Joe Corbett | 14 | 108.2 | 5 | 8 | 4.39 | 68 |
| Jack Dunleavy | 7 | 55.0 | 1 | 4 | 4.42 | 28 |
| Jim McGinley | 3 | 27.0 | 2 | 1 | 2.00 | 6 |
| War Sanders | 4 | 19.0 | 1 | 2 | 4.74 | 11 |
