= 1904 New York Giants season =

Major League Baseball season

1904 New York Giants
- National League champions
- League: National League
- Ballpark: Polo Grounds
- City: New York City
- Record: 106–47 (.693)
- League place: 1st
- Owners: John T. Brush
- Managers: John McGraw

The 1904 New York Giants season was the 22nd season in franchise history. They led the National League in both runs scored and fewest runs allowed, on their way to 106 wins and the pennant.

The first modern World Series had been played the previous year, but manager John McGraw and owner John T. Brush refused to play the American League champion Boston Americans in a World Series. They would change their position the following year.

== Regular season ==
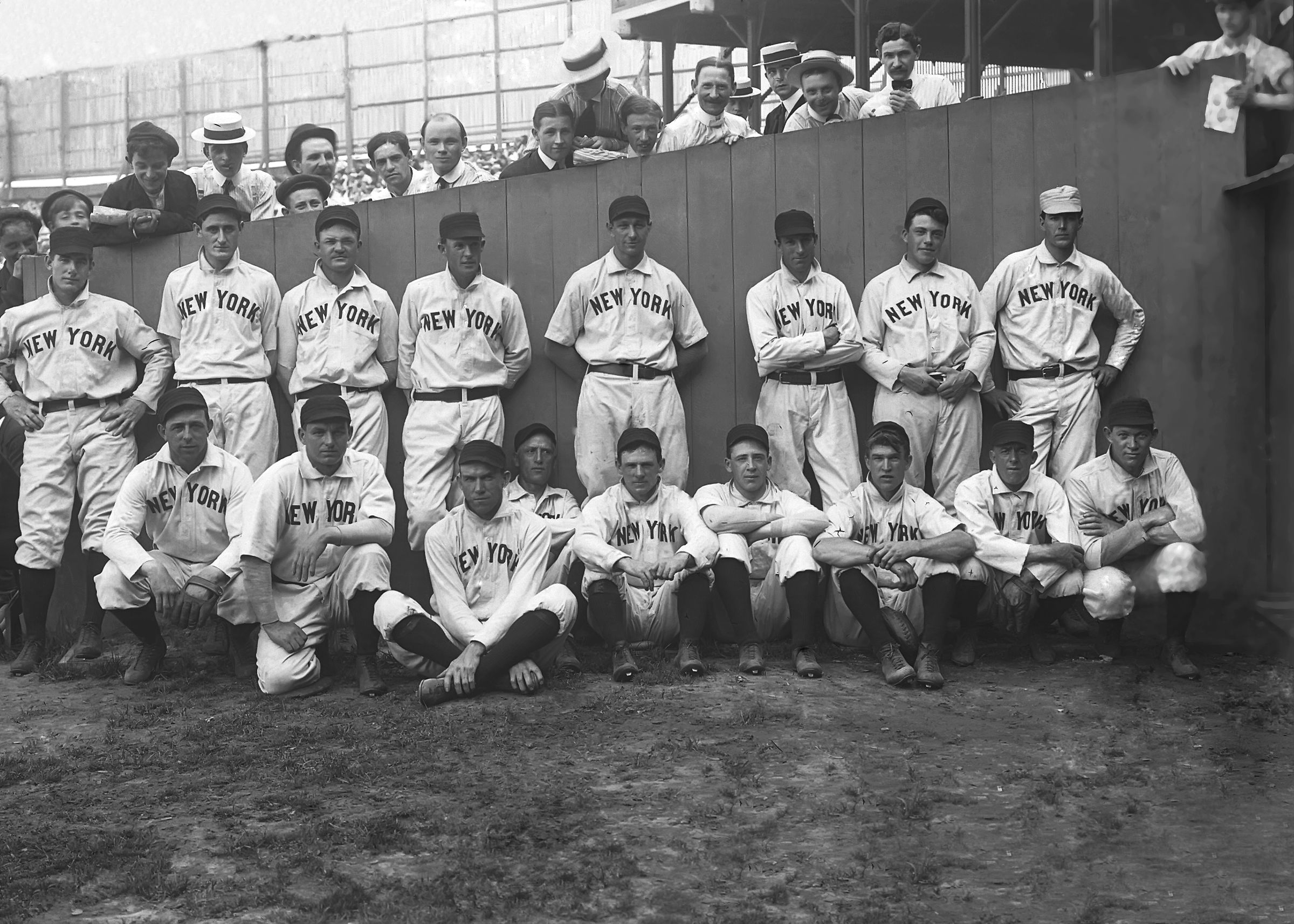
Team photograph

The Giants had little offensive firepower in this pitching-dominated era but scored using a balanced lineup and a lot of small-ball tactics formerly employed by manager McGraw in his playing days. The lineup featured three of the top five stolen base leaders in the majors: Bill Dahlen, Sam Mertes, and Dan McGann.

They also had one of the greatest pitching duos of all-time in Joe McGinnity and Christy Mathewson. They combined for 68 wins – a 20th-century record for two pitchers on the same team.

=== Season standings ===
National League
| Team | W | L | Pct. | GB | Home | Road |
|---|---|---|---|---|---|---|
| New York Giants | 106 | 47 | .693 | — | 56‍–‍26 | 50‍–‍21 |
| Chicago Cubs | 93 | 60 | .608 | 13 | 49‍–‍27 | 44‍–‍33 |
| Cincinnati Reds | 88 | 65 | .575 | 18 | 49‍–‍27 | 39‍–‍38 |
| Pittsburgh Pirates | 87 | 66 | .569 | 19 | 48‍–‍30 | 39‍–‍36 |
| St. Louis Cardinals | 75 | 79 | .487 | 31½ | 39‍–‍36 | 36‍–‍43 |
| Brooklyn Superbas | 56 | 97 | .366 | 50 | 31‍–‍44 | 25‍–‍53 |
| Boston Beaneaters | 55 | 98 | .359 | 51 | 34‍–‍45 | 21‍–‍53 |
| Philadelphia Phillies | 52 | 100 | .342 | 53½ | 28‍–‍43 | 24‍–‍57 |

=== Record vs. opponents ===
1904 National League record Sources:
| Team | BSN | BRO | CHC | CIN | NYG | PHI | PIT | STL |
|---|---|---|---|---|---|---|---|---|
| Boston | — | 9–13 | 9–13 | 7–15 | 2–20 | 11–10–1 | 8–14 | 9–13–1 |
| Brooklyn | 13–9 | — | 5–17 | 8–14 | 3–19 | 13–9 | 7–14–1 | 7–15 |
| Chicago | 13–9 | 17–5 | — | 13–8–1 | 11–11–2 | 15–7 | 9–13 | 15–7 |
| Cincinnati | 15–7 | 14–8 | 8–13–1 | — | 10–12–1 | 16–6 | 11–11–2 | 14–8 |
| New York | 20–2 | 19–3 | 11–11–2 | 12–10–1 | — | 17–4–2 | 12–10 | 15–7 |
| Philadelphia | 10–11–1 | 9–13 | 7–15 | 6–16 | 4–17–2 | — | 9–13 | 7–15 |
| Pittsburgh | 14–8 | 14–7–1 | 13–9 | 11–11–2 | 10–12 | 13–9 | — | 12–10 |
| St. Louis | 13–9–1 | 15–7 | 7–15 | 8–14 | 7–15 | 15–7 | 10–12 | — |

=== Notable transactions ===
- August 7, 1904: Doc Marshall was purchased from the Giants by the Boston Beaneaters.

=== Roster ===
1904 New York Giants
Roster
| Pitchers: Red Ames; Claude Elliott; Christy Mathewson; Joe McGinnity; Billy Milligan; Dummy Taylor; Hooks Wiltse; Catchers: Frank Bowerman; Doc Marshall; Jim O'Rourke; Jack Warner | Infielders: Dan Brouthers; Bill Dahlen; Art Devlin; Jack Dunn; Billy Gilbert; Dan McGann; John McGraw | Outfielders: Roger Bresnahan; George Browne; Mike Donlin; Moose McCormick; Sam Mertes | Manager: John McGraw |

== Player stats ==
=== Batting ===
==== Starters by position ====
Note: Pos = Position; G = Games played; AB = At bats; H = Hits; Avg. = Batting average; HR = Home runs; RBI = Runs batted in

| Pos | Player | G | AB | H | Avg. | HR | RBI |
|---|---|---|---|---|---|---|---|
| C | Jack Warner | 86 | 287 | 57 | .199 | 1 | 15 |
| 1B | Dan McGann | 141 | 517 | 148 | .286 | 6 | 71 |
| 2B | Billy Gilbert | 146 | 478 | 121 | .253 | 1 | 54 |
| 3B | Art Devlin | 130 | 474 | 133 | .281 | 1 | 66 |
| SS | Bill Dahlen | 145 | 523 | 140 | .268 | 2 | 80 |
| OF | Roger Bresnahan | 109 | 402 | 114 | .284 | 5 | 33 |
| OF | George Browne | 150 | 596 | 169 | .284 | 4 | 39 |
| OF | Sam Mertes | 148 | 532 | 147 | .276 | 4 | 78 |

==== Other batters ====
Note: G = Games played; AB = At bats; H = Hits; Avg. = Batting average; HR = Home runs; RBI = Runs batted in

| Player | G | AB | H | Avg. | HR | RBI |
|---|---|---|---|---|---|---|
| Frank Bowerman | 93 | 289 | 67 | .232 | 2 | 27 |
| Moose McCormick | 59 | 203 | 54 | .266 | 1 | 26 |
| Jack Dunn | 64 | 181 | 56 | .309 | 1 | 19 |
| Mike Donlin | 42 | 132 | 37 | .280 | 2 | 14 |
| Doc Marshall | 11 | 17 | 6 | .353 | 0 | 2 |
| John McGraw | 5 | 12 | 4 | .333 | 0 | 0 |
| Dan Brouthers | 2 | 5 | 0 | .000 | 0 | 0 |
| Jim O'Rourke | 1 | 4 | 1 | .250 | 0 | 0 |

=== Pitching ===
==== Starting pitchers ====
Note: G = Games pitched; IP = Innings pitched; W = Wins; L = Losses; ERA = Earned run average; SO = Strikeouts

| Player | G | IP | W | L | ERA | SO |
|---|---|---|---|---|---|---|
| Joe McGinnity | 51 | 408.0 | 35 | 8 | 1.61 | 144 |
| Christy Mathewson | 48 | 367.2 | 33 | 12 | 2.03 | 212 |
| Dummy Taylor | 36 | 296.1 | 21 | 15 | 2.34 | 138 |
| Red Ames | 16 | 115.0 | 4 | 6 | 2.27 | 93 |

==== Other pitchers ====
Note: G = Games pitched; IP = Innings pitched; W = Wins; L = Losses; ERA = Earned run average; SO = Strikeouts

| Player | G | IP | W | L | ERA | SO |
|---|---|---|---|---|---|---|
| Hooks Wiltse | 24 | 164.2 | 13 | 3 | 2.84 | 105 |
| Billy Milligan | 5 | 25.0 | 0 | 1 | 5.40 | 6 |
| Claude Elliott | 3 | 15.0 | 0 | 1 | 3.00 | 8 |

==== Relief pitchers ====
Note: G = Games pitched; W = Wins; L = Losses; SV = Saves; ERA = Earned run average; SO = Strikeouts

| Player | G | W | L | SV | ERA | SO |
|---|---|---|---|---|---|---|
| Jack Dunn | 1 | 0 | 0 | 0 | 4.50 | 1 |
| Frank Bowerman | 1 | 0 | 0 | 0 | 9.00 | 0 |

== Awards and honors ==
=== League top five finishers ===
George Browne

- NL leader in runs scored (99)

Bill Dahlen

- NL leader in RBI (80)
- #2 in NL in stolen bases (47)

Christy Mathewson

- NL leader in strikeouts (212)
- #2 in NL in wins (33)

Iron Man McGinnity

- NL leader in wins (35)
- NL leader in ERA (1.61)
- NL leader in shutouts (9)

Sam Mertes

- #2 in NL in RBI (78)
- #2 in NL in stolen bases (47)
