= Jack White (outfielder) =

American baseball player (1878–1963)

- Outfielder
- Born: January 19, 1878; Traders Point, Indiana, U.S.
- Died: September 30, 1963 (aged 85); Indianapolis, Indiana, U.S.
- Batted: Right Threw: Right

MLB debut
- June 26, 1904, for the Boston Beaneaters

Last MLB appearance
- June 26, 1904, for the Boston Beaneaters

MLB statistics
- At-bats: 5
- Batting average: .000
- Stats at Baseball Reference

Teams
- Boston Beaneaters (1904)

John Wallace White (January 19, 1878 – September 30, 1963) was an American Major League Baseball outfielder who played for one season. He played for the Boston Beaneaters for one game on June 26 during the 1904 Boston Beaneaters season.
