= Hugh Hill (baseball) =

American baseball player (1879–1958)

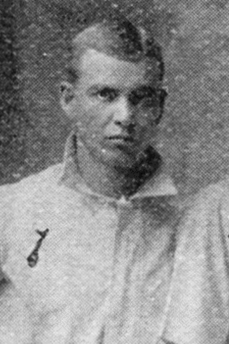
- Hill with the Nashville Baseball Club in 1902
- Outfielder
- Born: July 21, 1879; Ringgold, Georgia, U.S.
- Died: September 6, 1958 (aged 79); Cincinnati, Ohio, U.S.
- Batted: Left Threw: Right

MLB debut
- May 1, 1903, for the Cleveland Naps

Last MLB appearance
- October 9, 1904, for the St. Louis Cardinals

MLB statistics
- Batting average: .223
- Hits: 94
- Runs batted in: 4
- Stats at Baseball Reference

Teams
- As player: Cleveland Naps (1903); St. Louis Cardinals (1904)

Hugh Ellis Hill (July 21, 1879 – September 6, 1958) was an American Major League Baseball outfielder who played for two seasons. He played for the Cleveland Naps during the 1903 Cleveland Naps season and the St. Louis Cardinals during the 1904 St. Louis Cardinals season. Hill spent a few quality seasons with the American Association's Kansas City Blues prior to 1910. He is buried at the Spring Hill Cemetery in Charleston, West Virginia.
