= Ernie Groth =

American baseball player (1884–1950)

- Pitcher
- Born: December 24, 1884; Cedarburg, Wisconsin
- Died: May 23, 1950 (aged 65); Milwaukee, Wisconsin
- Batted: Right Threw: Right

MLB debut
- September 6, 1904, for the Chicago Cubs

Last MLB appearance
- October 7, 1904, for the Chicago Cubs

MLB statistics
- Win–loss record: 0–2
- Earned run average: 5.63
- Strikeouts: 9
- Stats at Baseball Reference

Teams
- Chicago Cubs (1904)

Ernest John Groth (December 24, 1884 – May 23, 1950), nicknamed "Dango", was a pitcher in Major League Baseball who played for the 1904 Chicago Cubs.
