= Peaches O'Neill =

American baseball player (1879–1955)

- Catcher
- Born: August 30, 1879; Anderson, Indiana, U.S.
- Died: August 2, 1955 (aged 75); Anderson, Indiana, U.S.
- Batted: Right Threw: Right

MLB debut
- April 16, 1904, for the Cincinnati Reds

Last MLB appearance
- August 4, 1904, for the Cincinnati Reds

MLB statistics
- Batting average: .267
- Home runs: 0
- Runs batted in: 1
- Stats at Baseball Reference

Teams
- Cincinnati Reds (1904)

Philip Bernard "Peaches" O'Neill (August 30, 1879 – August 2, 1955) was an American catcher for the Cincinnati Reds in the 1904 season. He later managed the Anderson, Indiana minor league baseball team in 1906.
