= Tom Fisher (1900s pitcher) =

American baseball player

- Pitcher
- Born: November 1, 1880; Anderson, Indiana, U.S.
- Died: September 3, 1972 (aged 91); Anderson, Indiana, U.S.
- Batted: Right Threw: Right

MLB debut
- April 17, 1904, for the Boston Beaneaters

Last MLB appearance
- October 3, 1904, for the Boston Beaneaters

MLB statistics
- Win–loss record: 6-16
- Strikeouts: 84
- Earned run average: 4.25
- Stats at Baseball Reference

Teams
- Boston Beaneaters (1904)

Thomas Chalmers Fisher (November 1, 1880 – September 3, 1972) was an American professional baseball pitcher. The 5"10½", 185 lb (84 kg) right-hander played one season in Major League Baseball for the Boston Beaneaters in 1904.

Fisher made his major league debut in relief on April 17, 1904 against the Brooklyn Superbas at Washington Park. His first major league win came as a starter on May 10 against the Chicago Cubs at West Side Park. The score was 7-1. He pitched his first shutout five days later at Robison Field, a 1–0 decision over the St. Louis Cardinals.

He ended his season and career with a 6–16 record for the 55-98 Beaneaters. Other totals include 31 games pitched, 21 games started, 19 complete games, 2 shutouts, 9 games finished, and an earned run average of 4.25 in 214 innings pitched. He struck out 84 and walked 82. He also played six games in center field, and in a total of 39 games played had a batting average of .212 (21-for-99) with 2 home runs and 8 RBI.

Fisher died in his hometown of Anderson, Indiana, at the age of 91.

== Trivia ==
- Fisher's nickname was "Red."
