= Charlie Swindells =

American baseball player (1878–1940)

- Catcher
- Born: October 26, 1878; Rockford, Illinois, U.S.
- Died: July 22, 1940 (aged 61); Portland, Oregon, U.S.
- Batted: Right Threw: Right

MLB debut
- September 7, 1904, for the St. Louis Cardinals

Last MLB appearance
- September 22, 1904, for the St. Louis Cardinals

MLB statistics
- Batting average: .125
- Home runs: 0
- RBI: 0
- Stats at Baseball Reference

Teams
- St. Louis Cardinals (1904)

Charles Jay "Swin" Swindells (October 26, 1878 – July 22, 1940) was an American who played Major League Baseball as a catcher for the St. Louis Cardinals in September, 1904. He went to Stanford University. He was the manager of the Community of the Northwestern League in 1907.

== Sources ==
- Career statistics from Baseball Reference · Baseball Reference (Minors) · Retrosheet · Baseball Almanac
