= Joe Stewart (baseball) =

American baseball player (1879-1913)

- Pitcher
- Born: March 11, 1879; Monroe, North Carolina, U.S.
- Died: February 9, 1913 (aged 33); Youngstown, Ohio, U.S.
- Batted: Unknown Threw: Right

MLB debut
- June 9, 1904, for the Boston Beaneaters

Last MLB appearance
- June 11, 1904, for the Boston Beaneaters

MLB statistics
- Games pitched: 2
- Earned run average: 9.64
- Strikeouts: 1
- Stats at Baseball Reference

Teams
- Boston Beaneaters (1904)

Joseph Lawrence Stewart (March 11, 1879 – February 9, 1913), nicknamed "Ace", was a Major League Baseball pitcher who played in 1904 with the Boston Beaneaters. He batted and threw right-handed. Stewart had a 0-0 record, with a 9.64 ERA, in 2 games, in his one-year career.

He was born in Monroe, North Carolina and died in Youngstown, Ohio.
