= Jesse Purnell =

American baseball player (1881-1966)

- Third baseman
- Born: May 11, 1881; Glenside, Pennsylvania
- Died: July 4, 1966 (aged 85); Philadelphia, Pennsylvania
- Batted: Left Threw: Right

MLB debut
- October 1, 1904, for the Philadelphia Phillies

Last MLB appearance
- October 8, 1904, for the Philadelphia Phillies

MLB statistics
- Games played: 7
- At bats: 19
- Hits: 2
- Stats at Baseball Reference

Teams
- Philadelphia Phillies (1904)

Jesse Rhoades Purnell (May 11, 1881 to July 4, 1966), was a Major League Baseball third baseman who played in 1904 with the Philadelphia Phillies. He batted left and threw right-handed. Purnell had two hits and scored 2 runs in 19 at-bats in seven career games. He was born in Glenside, Pennsylvania, and died in Philadelphia, Pennsylvania.
