= Harry McChesney =

American football and baseball player (1880–1960)

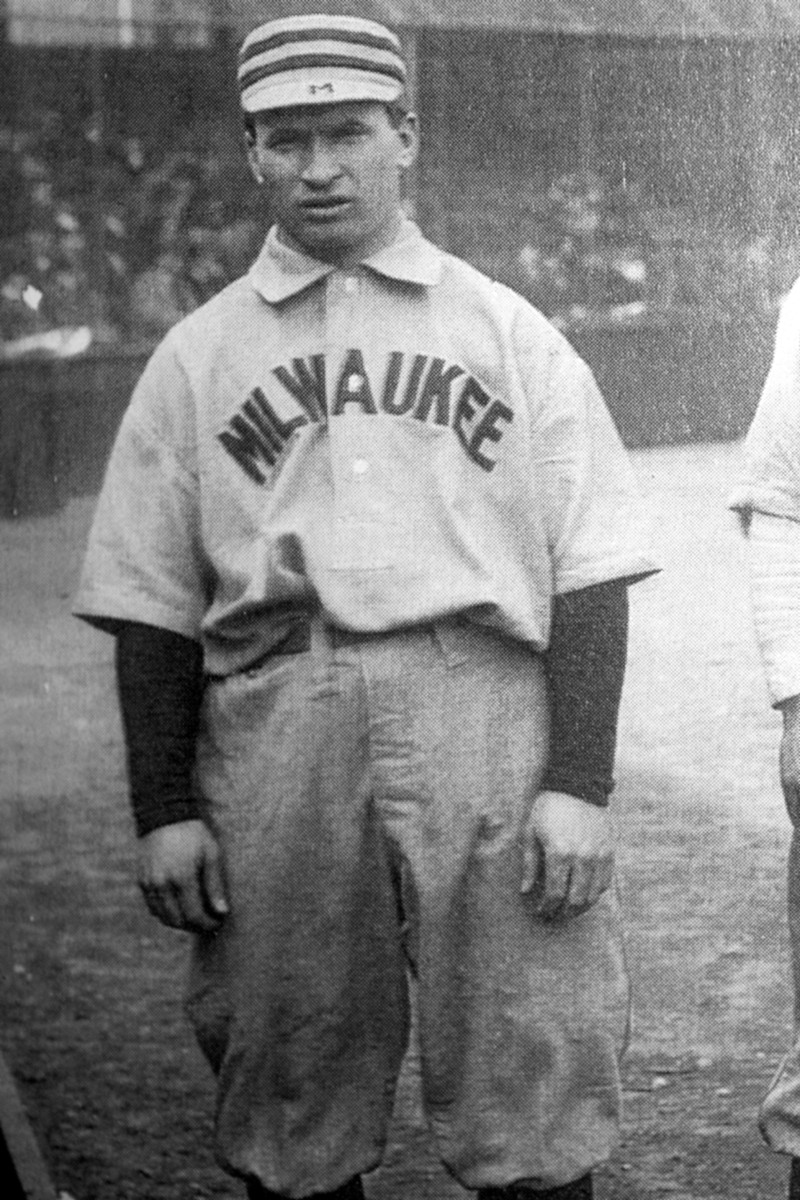
- McChesney in 1905

Profile
- Position: Halfback

Personal information
- Born: June 1, 1880; Pittsburgh, Pennsylvania, U.S.
- Died: August 11, 1960 (aged 80); Pittsburgh, Pennsylvania, U.S.

Career history
- 1901: Pittsburgh Athletic Club
- 1902: Pittsburgh Stars
- 1903–1904: Massillon Tigers

Awards and highlights
- 1902 NFL (1902) Champs; 1903 Ohio League Champs; 1904 Ohio League Champs

Harry McChesney
- Rightfielder
- Batted: Right Threw: Right

MLB debut
- September 17, 1904, for the Chicago Cubs

Last MLB appearance
- October 9, 1904, for the Chicago Cubs

MLB statistics
- Batting average: .261
- Hits: 23
- RBI: 11
- Stats at Baseball Reference

Teams
- Chicago Cubs (1904)

Harry Vincent McChesney (June 1, 1880 – August 11, 1960), nicknamed "Pud", was an American professional football player, as well as a professional baseball player. He played 22 games in the majors in 1904 for the Chicago Cubs. The rest of his 12-year career was spent in the minors, where he played in the Western League, the American Association (AA), the New York State League and the Texas League.

Prior to his professional baseball career, McChesney played for the Pittsburgh Stars of the first National Football League (NFL) as well as the Massillon Tigers of the Ohio League and the Pittsburgh Athletic Club. He was considered one of the best punters of his era.
