= Tom Walker (1900s pitcher) =

American baseball player (1881–1944)

- Pitcher
- Born: August 1, 1881; Philadelphia, Pennsylvania, U.S.
- Died: July 10, 1944 (aged 62); Woodbury Heights, New Jersey, U.S.
- Batted: Right Threw: Right

MLB debut
- September 27, 1902, for the Philadelphia Athletics

Last MLB appearance
- September 30, 1905, for the Cincinnati Reds

MLB statistics
- Win–loss record: 24-16
- Earned run average: 2.70
- Strikeouts: 94
- Stats at Baseball Reference

Teams
- Philadelphia Athletics (1902); Cincinnati Reds (1904–1905)

Thomas William Walker (August 1, 1881 – July 10, 1944) was an American Major League Baseball pitcher in 1902 with the Philadelphia Athletics and in 1904 and 1905 with the Cincinnati Reds. He batted and threw right-handed.

He was born in Philadelphia, and died in Woodbury Heights, New Jersey.
