= Jack Rafter =

American baseball player (1875–1943)

- Catcher
- Born: February 20, 1875; Troy, New York, U.S.
- Died: January 5, 1943 (aged 67); Troy, New York, U.S.
- Batted: Right Threw: Right

MLB debut
- September 24, 1904, for the Pittsburgh Pirates

Last MLB appearance
- September 24, 1904, for the Pittsburgh Pirates

MLB statistics
- Games played: 1
- At bats: 3
- Hits: 0
- Stats at Baseball Reference

Teams
- Pittsburgh Pirates (1904)

John Cornelius Rafter (February 20, 1875 – January 5, 1943) was an American Major League Baseball catcher who played in 1904 with the Pittsburgh Pirates. In one game, he went hitless in three at-bats. He attended Fordham University.

He was born in and died in Troy, New York.
