= Fred Holmes =

American baseball player (1878–1956)

- First baseman / Catcher
- Born: July 1, 1878; Chicago, Illinois, US
- Died: February 13, 1956 (aged 77); Chicago, Illinois, US
- Batted: Right Threw: Right

MLB debut
- August 23, 1903, for the New York Highlanders

Last MLB appearance
- April 24, 1904, for the Chicago Cubs

MLB statistics
- Batting average: .333
- Home runs: 0
- Runs batted in: 0
- Stats at Baseball Reference

Teams
- New York Highlanders (1903); Chicago Cubs (1904)

Frederick Clarence Holmes (July 1, 1878 – February 13, 1956) was an American Major League Baseball first baseman and catcher.

Holmes played for the New York Highlanders in 1903 and the Chicago Cubs in 1904. In two career games, he had one hit in three at-bats. He batted and threw right-handed.

Holmes was born in Chicago, Illinois and died in Norwood Park, Chicago.
