= Butch Rementer =

American baseball player (1878-1922)

- Catcher
- Born: March 14, 1878; Philadelphia, Pennsylvania, U.S.
- Died: September 23, 1922 (aged 44); Philadelphia, Pennsylvania, U.S.
- Batted: Right Threw: Right

MLB debut
- October 8, 1904, for the Philadelphia Phillies

Last MLB appearance
- October 8, 1904, for the Philadelphia Phillies

MLB statistics
- Batting average: .000
- Home runs: 0
- Runs batted in: 0
- Stats at Baseball Reference

Teams
- Philadelphia Phillies (1904)

Willis J. Rementer (March 14, 1878 – September 23, 1922) was an American Major League Baseball catcher for the Philadelphia Phillies.

== Sources ==
- Career statistics from Baseball Reference · Baseball Reference (Minors) · Retrosheet · Baseball Almanac
