= Joe Koukalik =

American baseball player (1880–1947)

- Pitcher
- Born: March 3, 1880; Studena, Bohemia, Austria-Hungary
- Died: January 2, 1947 (aged 66); Chicago, Illinois, U.S.
- Batted: Right Threw: Right

MLB debut
- September 1, 1904, for the Brooklyn Superbas

Last MLB appearance
- September 1, 1904, for the Brooklyn Superbas

MLB statistics
- Win–loss record: 0–1
- Earned run average: 1.13
- Strikeouts: 1
- Stats at Baseball Reference

Teams
- Brooklyn Superbas (1904)

Josef Koukalik (March 3, 1880 – January 2, 1947) was an American professional baseball pitcher. He pitched in one game for the Brooklyn Superbas on September 1, 1904.

After his short stint in Brooklyn, Koukalik played for the Western League, a Minor League Baseball Single-A league. He played for the Omaha Rourkes as a pitcher and a batter. In 1905, Koukalik pitched twenty-eight innings for the Single-A Rourkes. He allowed eight runs to score. As a hitter Joe had a batting average of .138.
