= Gene McAuliffe =

American baseball player (1872–1953)

- Catcher
- Born: February 28, 1872; Randolph, Massachusetts, U.S.
- Died: April 29, 1953 (aged 81); Randolph, Massachusetts, U.S.
- Batted: Right Threw: Right

MLB debut
- August 17, 1904, for the Boston Beaneaters

Last MLB appearance
- August 17, 1904, for the Boston Beaneaters

MLB statistics
- Batting average: .500
- Home runs: 0
- Runs batted in: 0
- Stats at Baseball Reference

Teams
- Boston Beaneaters (1904)

Eugene Leo McAuliffe (February 28, 1872 – April 29, 1953) was an American Major League Baseball catcher who played for the Boston Beaneaters in 1904. The 32-year-old rookie stood 6'1" and weighed 180 lb.

On August 17, 1904, McAuliffe got into a home game against the Chicago Cubs at South End Grounds. He was 1-for-2 (.500) at the plate, and behind the plate he had one putout, one assist, and one error for a fielding percentage of .667.

He died in his hometown of Randolph, Massachusetts, aged 81.
