= Fred Odwell =

American baseball player (1872–1948)

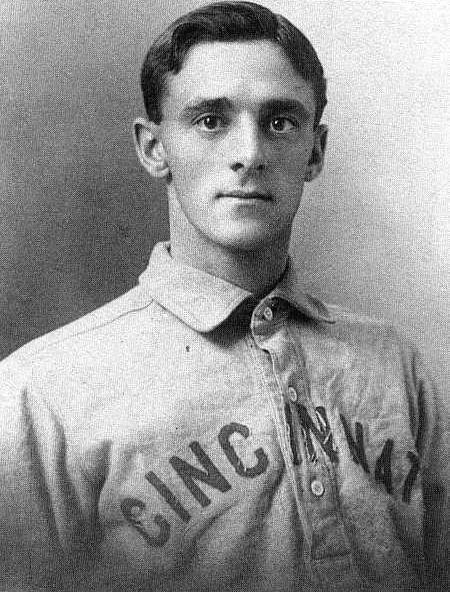
- Outfielder
- Born: September 25, 1872; Downsville, New York, U.S.
- Died: August 19, 1948 (aged 75); Downsville, New York, U.S.
- Batted: Left Threw: Right

MLB debut
- April 16, 1904, for the Cincinnati Reds

Last MLB appearance
- September 12, 1907, for the Cincinnati Reds

MLB statistics
- Batting average: .258
- Home runs: 10
- Runs batted in: 168
- Stats at Baseball Reference

Teams
- Cincinnati Reds (1904–1907)

Career highlights and awards
- NL home run leader (1905)

Frederick William Odwell (September 25, 1872 – August 19, 1948) was an American professional baseball player. He was an outfielder over parts of four seasons with the Cincinnati Reds. In 1905, he led the National League in home runs. He was born in and later died at the age of 75 in Downsville, New York.

== Career ==
1904 was Odwell's first season in the Major Leagues. He made his Major League debut on April 16, and finished the season with Cincinnati with a batting average of .284, with 133 hits, including 22 doubles, 10 triples and a home run, plus 26 walks.

In 1905, Odwell finished with a .241 average, with ten doubles, nine triples and nine home runs, along with 26 walks. The nine home runs hit led the National League that season, edging teammate Cy Seymour who had eight. Seymour led the National League that season in batting average (.377) and runs batted in (121) and was tied with Odwell for the lead in home runs at eight with two games left in the season, and would have taken the batting Triple Crown if the two stayed tied. In the next-to-last game of the season, Odwell hit an inside-the-park home run and took the home run title with nine. The nine home runs he hit in 1905 were the last home runs of his Major League career.

Odwell only played in 58 games for Cincinnati in the 1906 season, finishing with a batting average of .245 with two doubles, four triples and no home runs, together with 15 walks. In the 1907 season, his last in the majors, he hit for a .294 average, with five doubles, seven triples and no home runs, with 22 walks. His last Major League game was on September 12, 1907. Odwell had injured his leg in an August game and struggled to return to play. He was ultimately shut down after failing to make it down the baseline on a groundout in Pittsburgh.

Though Odwell was almost exclusively an outfielder during his career, he played one game at second base in 1904 and another in 1907.

== See also ==
- List of Major League Baseball annual home run leaders
