= Bill Lauterborn =

American baseball player (1879-1965)

- Second baseman/Third baseman
- Born: June 9, 1879; Hornell, New York, U.S.
- Died: April 19, 1965 (aged 85); Andover, New York, U.S.
- Batted: Right Threw: Right

MLB debut
- September 20, 1904, for the Boston Beaneaters

Last MLB appearance
- August 28, 1905, for the Boston Beaneaters

MLB statistics
- Batting average: .208
- Home runs: 0
- Runs batted in: 11
- Stats at Baseball Reference

Teams
- Boston Beaneaters (1904–1905)

William Bernard Lauterborn (June 9, 1879 – April 19, 1965) was an American infielder in Major League Baseball. He went to Fordham University.
