= Ed McNichol =

American baseball player (1879–1952)

- Pitcher
- Born: January 10, 1879; Martins Ferry, Ohio
- Died: November 1, 1952 (aged 73); Salineville, Ohio
- Batted: Right Threw: Right

MLB debut
- July 9, 1904, for the Boston Beaneaters

Last MLB appearance
- October 3, 1904, for the Boston Beaneaters

MLB statistics
- Win–loss record: 2–12
- Earned run average: 4.28
- Strikeouts: 39
- Stats at Baseball Reference

Teams
- Boston Beaneaters (1904)

Edwin Briggs McNichol (January 10, 1879 – November 1, 1952) was a Major League Baseball pitcher. He played a single year, 1904, for the Boston Beaneaters. He died in a house fire in 1952.
