= Jack Gilbert (baseball) =

American baseball player (1875–1941)

- First baseman
- Born: September 4, 1875; Rhinecliff, New York, U.S.
- Died: July 7, 1941 (aged 65); Albany, New York, U.S.

MLB debut
- September 11, 1898, for the Washington Senators

Last MLB appearance
- October 9, 1904, for the Pittsburgh Pirates

MLB statistics
- Batting average: .240
- Home runs: 0
- Runs batted in: 4
- Stats at Baseball Reference

Teams
- Washington Senators (1898); New York Giants (1898); Pittsburgh Pirates (1904)

John Robert Gilbert (September 4, 1875 – July 7, 1941), nicknamed "Jackrabbit", was an American backup outfielder in Major League Baseball who played between 1898 and 1904 for the Washington Senators (1898), New York Giants (1898) and Pittsburgh Pirates (1904). He was born in Rhinecliff, New York.

In a two-season career, Gilbert was a .240 hitter (23-for-96) with 13 runs and four RBI in 28 games, including five stolen bases and a .354 on-base percentage.

Gilbert died in Albany, New York at the age of 65.
