= Kid O'Hara =

American baseball player (1875-1954)

- Outfielder
- Born: December 19, 1875; Wilkes-Barre, Pennsylvania, U.S.
- Died: December 1, 1954 (aged 78); Canton, Ohio, U.S.
- Batted: Switch Threw: Right

MLB debut
- September 15, 1904, for the Boston Beaneaters

Last MLB appearance
- September 22, 1904, for the Boston Beaneaters

MLB statistics
- Batting average: .207
- Home runs: 0
- Runs batted in: 0
- Stats at Baseball Reference

Teams
- Boston Beaneaters (1904)

James Francis "Kid" O'Hara (December 19, 1875 – December 1, 1954) was an American outfielder in Major League Baseball.
