= Rip Cannell =

American baseball player (1880-1948)

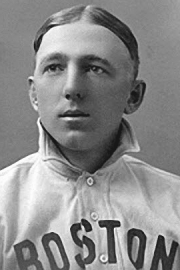
- Outfielder
- Born: January 23, 1880; South Bridgton, Maine, U.S.
- Died: August 26, 1948 (aged 68); Bridgton, Maine, U.S.
- Batted: Left Threw: Right

MLB debut
- April 14, 1904, for the Boston Beaneaters

Last MLB appearance
- October 7, 1905, for the Boston Beaneaters

MLB statistics
- Batting average: .242
- Home runs: 0
- Runs batted in: 54
- Stats at Baseball Reference

Teams
- Boston Beaneaters (1904–1905)

Wirt Virgin Cannell (January 23, 1880 – August 26, 1948) was an American professional baseball outfielder who played with the Boston Beaneaters of Major League Baseball in 1904 and 1905. He went to Tufts University in Massachusetts. He was born in Bridgton, Maine.

== Sources ==
- Career statistics from Baseball Reference, or Baseball Reference (Minors)
