= Tom Stanton (baseball) =

American baseball player (1874–1957)

- Catcher
- Born: October 25, 1874; St. Louis, Missouri, U.S.
- Died: January 17, 1957 (aged 82); St. Louis, Missouri, U.S.
- Batted: Switch Threw: Right

MLB debut
- April 19, 1904, for the Chicago Cubs

Last MLB appearance
- April 19, 1904, for the Chicago Cubs

MLB statistics
- Batting average: .000
- Home runs: 0
- Runs batted in: 0
- Stats at Baseball Reference

Teams
- Chicago Cubs (1904)

Thomas Patrick Stanton (25 October 1874 – 17 January 1957) was an American Major League Baseball catcher. He played for the 1904 Chicago Cubs.
