= Tom Barry (baseball) =

American baseball player

- Pitcher
- Born: April 10, 1879; St. Louis, Missouri, U.S.
- Died: June 4, 1946 (aged 67); St. Louis, Missouri, U.S.
- Batted: Unknown Threw: Right

MLB debut
- April 15, 1904, for the Philadelphia Phillies

Last MLB appearance
- April 15, 1904, for the Philadelphia Phillies

MLB statistics
- Win–loss record: 0–1
- Earned run average: 40.50
- Strikeouts: 1
- Stats at Baseball Reference

Teams
- Philadelphia Phillies (1904)

Thomas Arthur Barry (April 10, 1879 – June 4, 1946) was an American Major League Baseball pitcher who played for one season. He pitched in one game for the Philadelphia Phillies on April 15 during the 1904 Philadelphia Phillies season.
