= She Donahue =

American baseball player (1877–1947)

- Shortstop / Third baseman
- Born: June 29, 1877; Oswego, New York, U.S.
- Died: August 27, 1947 (aged 70); Bronx, New York, U.S.
- Batted: Right Threw: Right

MLB debut
- April 19, 1904, for the St. Louis Cardinals

Last MLB appearance
- October 3, 1904, for the Philadelphia Phillies

MLB statistics
- Batting average: .219
- Home runs: 0
- Runs batted in: 16
- Stats at Baseball Reference

Teams
- St. Louis Cardinals (1904); Philadelphia Phillies (1904)

Charles Michael "She" Donahue (June 29, 1877 – August 27, 1947) played Major League baseball as an infielder for the St. Louis Cardinals and Philadelphia Phillies.

== Sources ==
- Career statistics from Baseball Reference · Baseball Reference (Minors) · Retrosheet · Baseball Almanac
