= George Browne (baseball) =

American baseball player (1876–1920)

- Right fielder
- Born: January 12, 1876; Richmond, Virginia, U.S.
- Died: December 9, 1920 (aged 44); Hyde Park, New York, U.S.
- Batted: Left Threw: Right

MLB debut
- September 27, 1901, for the Philadelphia Phillies

Last MLB appearance
- June 24, 1912, for the Philadelphia Phillies

MLB statistics
- Batting average: .273
- Home runs: 18
- Runs batted in: 303
- Stats at Baseball Reference

Teams
- Philadelphia Phillies (1901–1902); New York Giants (1902–1907); Boston Doves (1908); Chicago Cubs (1909); Washington Senators (1909–1910); Chicago White Sox (1910); Brooklyn Dodgers (1911); Philadelphia Phillies (1912)

Career highlights and awards
- World Series champion (1905)

George Edward Browne (January 12, 1876 – December 9, 1920) was an American professional baseball right fielder. He played in Major League Baseball (MLB) for the Philadelphia Phillies, New York Giants, Boston Doves, Chicago Cubs, Washington Senators, Chicago White Sox, and Brooklyn Dodgers between 1901 and 1912.

== Biography ==
Browne was born in Richmond, Virginia. Browne entered the major leagues with the Philadelphia Phillies in 1901. Though he usually spent one or two seasons with a team, he remained with the New York Giants from 1902 to 1907. He was the National League leader in runs scored in 1904 with New York; runs were down across the league and Browne's 99 runs were the lowest total for a league leader until 1915.

A member of the 1905 World Series champion Giants, Browne hit .227 with one RBI and two runs scored in the World Series. Moonlight Graham, whose one-inning major-league career became famous through the movie Field of Dreams, replaced Browne in his lone appearance for the 1905 Giants. Browne's "World's Champions" jersey, which the Giants wore during the 1906 season, was exhibited at the Baseball Hall of Fame.

After leaving the Giants following the 1907 season, Browne played one season with the Boston Doves and was sold to the Chicago Cubs; the Washington Senators then purchased him early in the 1909 season. He remained there until mid-1910, when he was sold to the Chicago White Sox. For his career, he compiled a .273 batting average, 303 runs batted in, 614 runs scored, and 190 stolen bases.

In 1920, Browne became sick with tuberculosis right as former teammate Christy Mathewson was recovering from the illness. Newspaper accounts highlighted the differences in financial capacity between the former star Mathewson and the lesser-known Browne. While Mathewson had been able to afford the best treatment, Browne's friends had to help ensure that he was admitted to a hospital in the Bronx. The New York Giants raised $1,825 for him in a benefit baseball game.

On December 9, 1920, Browne died of tuberculosis at his home in Hyde Park, New York, at the age of 44. He was interred at St. Peter's Cemetery in Poughkeepsie.

== See also ==
- List of Major League Baseball annual runs scored leaders
- List of Major League Baseball career stolen bases leaders
