= Deacon Van Buren =

American baseball player (1870-1957)

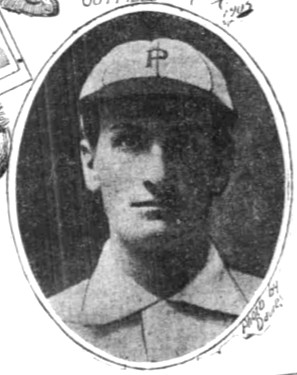
- Outfielder
- Born: December 14, 1870; LaSalle County, Illinois, U.S.
- Died: June 29, 1957 (aged 86); Portland, Oregon, U.S.
- Batted: Left Threw: Right

MLB debut
- April 21, 1904, for the Brooklyn Superbas

Last MLB appearance
- May 15, 1904, for the Philadelphia Phillies

MLB statistics
- Batting average: .250
- Home runs: 0
- Runs batted in: 3
- Stats at Baseball Reference

Teams
- Brooklyn Superbas (1904); Philadelphia Phillies (1904)

Edward Eugene Van Buren (December 14, 1870 in LaSalle County, Illinois – June 29, 1957 in Portland, Oregon), was an American professional baseball player who played outfield during the 1904 season.
