= John Brackenridge (baseball) =

American baseball player (1880-1953)

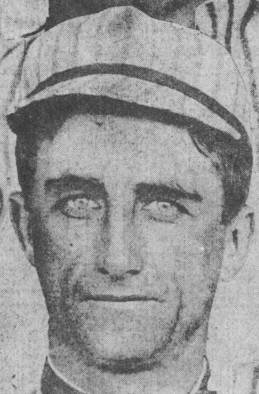
- Pitcher
- Born: December 24, 1880; Harrisburg, Pennsylvania, U.S.
- Died: March 20, 1953 (aged 72); Harrisburg, Pennsylvania, U.S.
- Batted: Right Threw: Right

MLB debut
- April 15, 1904, for the Philadelphia Phillies

Last MLB appearance
- May 30, 1904, for the Philadelphia Phillies

MLB statistics
- Win–loss record: 0–1
- ERA: 5.56
- Strikeouts: 11
- Stats at Baseball Reference

Teams
- Philadelphia Phillies (1904)

John Givler Brackenridge (December 24, 1880 – March 20, 1953) was an American Major League Baseball (MLB) pitcher. Brackenridge played for the Philadelphia Phillies in the 1904 season. In 7 career games, he had a 0-1 record with a 5.56 ERA. He batted and threw right-handed.

Brackenridge was born and died in Harrisburg, Pennsylvania.
