= Jack Sutthoff =

American baseball player (1873–1942)

- Pitcher
- Born: June 29, 1873; Cincinnati, Ohio, U.S.
- Died: August 3, 1942 (aged 69); Cincinnati, Ohio, U.S.
- Batted: Left Threw: Right

MLB debut
- September 15, 1898, for the Washington Senators

Last MLB appearance
- August 7, 1905, for the Philadelphia Phillies

MLB statistics
- Win–loss record: 31–40
- Earned run average: 3.65
- Strikeouts: 194
- Stats at Baseball Reference

Teams
- Washington Senators (1898); St. Louis Perfectos (1899); Cincinnati Reds (1901, 1903–1904); Philadelphia Phillies (1904–1905)

John Gerhard Sutthoff (June 29, 1873 – August 3, 1942) was an American pitcher in Major League Baseball. He played all or parts of six seasons in the major leagues between 1898 and 1905, for four teams.
