= Claude Elliott (baseball) =

American baseball player (1876–1923)

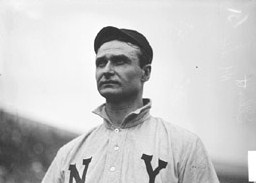
- Pitcher
- Born: November 17, 1876; Pardeeville, Wisconsin, U.S.
- Died: June 22, 1923 (aged 46); Pardeeville, Wisconsin, U.S.
- Batted: Right Threw: Right

MLB debut
- April 16, 1904, for the Cincinnati Reds

Last MLB appearance
- October 7, 1905, for the New York Giants

MLB statistics
- Win–loss record: 3–3
- Earned run average: 3.33
- Strikeouts: 47
- Stats at Baseball Reference

Teams
- Cincinnati Reds (1904); New York Giants (1904–1905)

Career highlights and awards
- World Series champion (1905)

Claude Judson "Chaucer" Elliott (November 17, 1876 – June 22, 1923) was an American professional baseball player. He was a right-handed pitcher over parts of two seasons (1904–1905) with the Cincinnati Reds and New York Giants. For his career, he compiled a 3–3 record in 22 appearances, with a 3.33 earned run average and 47 strikeouts. He was a member of the 1905 World Series champions Giants, though he did not play in the World Series.

In 1905, Elliott relieved 8 times in his 10 appearances. Though saves were not an official statistic until 1969, Elliot was retroactively credited with six saves that season, a record at that time. His manager, John McGraw, was one of the first to use a relief pitcher to save games.

On June 29, 1905, while playing for the Giants, Elliott played a part in history that would be immortalized some 80 years later with the making of Field of Dreams. The movie included a depiction of Moonlight Graham, who only played one inning in Major League baseball and never got an at-bat. It was Elliot who flied out ending the top of the ninth inning with Graham on deck.

Elliott was born in Pardeeville, Wisconsin. He died of muscular atrophy in Pardeeville at the age of 46.

== See also ==
- List of Major League Baseball annual saves leaders
