= 1905 St. Louis Cardinals season =

Major League Baseball season

1905 St. Louis Cardinals
- League: National League
- Ballpark: League Park
- City: St. Louis, Missouri
- Record: 58–96 (.377)
- League place: 6th
- Owners: Frank Robison and Stanley Robison
- Managers: Kid Nichols, Jimmy Burke, and Stanley Robison

The 1905 St. Louis Cardinals season was the team's 24th season in St. Louis, Missouri and the 14th season in the National League. The Cardinals went 58–96 during the season and finished sixth in the National League.

== Regular season ==
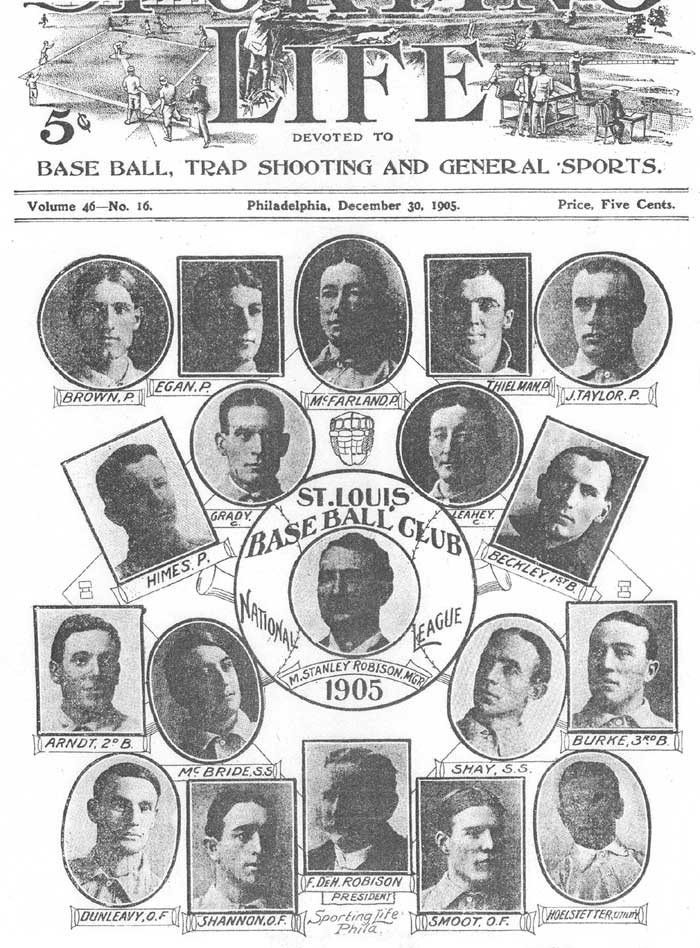
The 1905 St. Louis Cardinals

=== Season standings ===
National League
Team	W	L	Pct.	GB	Home	Road
New York Giants	105	48	.686	—	54‍–‍21	51‍–‍27
Pittsburgh Pirates	96	57	.627	9	49‍–‍28	47‍–‍29
Chicago Cubs	92	61	.601	13	54‍–‍25	38‍–‍36
Philadelphia Phillies	83	69	.546	21½	39‍–‍36	44‍–‍33
Cincinnati Reds	79	74	.516	26	50‍–‍28	29‍–‍46
St. Louis Cardinals	58	96	.377	47½	32‍–‍45	26‍–‍51
Boston Beaneaters	51	103	.331	54½	29‍–‍46	22‍–‍57
Brooklyn Superbas	48	104	.316	56½	29‍–‍47	19‍–‍57

=== Record vs. opponents ===
1905 National League record Sources:
Team	BSN	BRO	CHC	CIN	NYG	PHI	PIT	STL
Boston	—	11–11–1	7–15	8–14	3–19	5–17–1	9–13	8–14
Brooklyn	11–11–1	—	6–16	4–18	7–15	3–18–1	7–14–1	10–12
Chicago	15–7	16–6	—	12–10	10–12	12–9–1	10–12–1	17–5
Cincinnati	14–8	18–4	10–12	—	5–16–2	13–9	9–13	10–12
New York	19–3	15–7	12–10	16–5–2	—	14–8	12–10	17–5
Philadelphia	17–5–1	18–3–1	9–12–1	9–13	8–14	—	6–16	16–6
Pittsburgh	13–9	14–7–1	12–10–1	13–9	10–12	16–6	—	18–4
St. Louis	14–8	12–10	5–17	12–10	5–17	6–16	4–18	—

=== Roster ===
1905 St. Louis Cardinals
Roster
Pitchers: Buster Brown; Billy Campbell; Wish Egan; Win Kellum; Sandy McDougal; Chappie McFarland; Jim McGinley; Kid Nichols; Jack Taylor; Jake Thielman	Catchers: Mike Grady; Tom Leahy; Gerry Shea; Jack Warner; Dave Zearfoss; Infielders: Harry Arndt; Jake Beckley; Dave Brain; Jimmy Burke; John Farrell; Art Hoelskoetter; George McBride; Simmy Murch; Danny Shay	Outfielders: Josh Clarke; Rube DeGroff; Jack Dunleavy; Jack Himes; Spike Shannon; Homer Smoot	Manager: Jimmy Burke; Kid Nichols; Stanley Robison

== Player stats ==
=== Batting ===
==== Starters by position ====
Note: Pos = Position; G = Games played; AB = At bats; H = Hits; Avg. = Batting average; HR = Home runs; RBI = Runs batted in

Pos	Player	G	AB	H	Avg.	HR	RBI
C	Mike Grady	100	311	89	.286	4	41
1B	Jake Beckley	134	514	147	.286	1	57
2B	Harry Arndt	113	415	101	.243	2	36
SS	George McBride	81	281	61	.217	2	34
3B	Jimmy Burke	122	431	97	.225	1	30
OF	Homer Smoot	139	534	166	.311	4	58
OF	Spike Shannon	140	544	146	.268	0	41
OF	Jack Dunleavy	119	435	105	.241	1	25

==== Other batters ====
Note: G = Games played; AB = At bats; H = Hits; Avg. = Batting average; HR = Home runs; RBI = Runs batted in

Player	G	AB	H	Avg.	HR	RBI
Danny Shay	78	281	67	.238	0	28
Josh Clarke	50	167	43	.257	3	18
Dave Brain	44	158	36	.228	1	17
Jack Warner	41	137	35	.255	1	12
Tom Leahy	35	97	22	.227	0	7
Art Hoelskoetter	24	83	20	.241	0	5
Rube DeGroff	15	56	14	.250	0	5
Dave Zearfoss	20	51	8	.157	0	2
Jack Himes	12	41	6	.146	0	0
John Farrell	7	24	4	.167	0	1
Simmy Murch	4	9	1	.111	0	0
Gerry Shea	2	6	2	.333	0	0

=== Pitching ===
==== Starting pitchers ====
Note: G = Games pitched; IP = Innings pitched; W = Wins; L = Losses; ERA = Earned run average; SO = Strikeouts

Player	G	IP	W	L	ERA	SO
Jack Taylor	37	309.0	15	21	3.44	102
Chappie McFarland	31	250.1	8	18	3.81	85
Jake Thielman	32	242.0	15	16	3.50	87
Buster Brown	23	178.2	8	11	2.97	57
Wish Egan	23	171.1	6	15	3.97	29
Kid Nichols	7	51.2	1	5	5.40	16
Sandy McDougal	5	44.2	1	4	3.43	10
Billy Campbell	2	17.0	1	1	7.41	2
Art Hoelskoetter	1	6.0	0	1	1.50	4
Jim McGinley	1	3.0	0	1	15.00	0

==== Other pitchers ====
Note: G = Games pitched; IP = Innings pitched; W = Wins; L = Losses; ERA = Earned run average; SO = Strikeouts

Player	G	IP	W	L	ERA	SO
Win Kellum	11	74.0	3	3	2.92	19
