= 1905 Brooklyn Superbas season =

1905 Brooklyn Superbas
- League: National League
- Ballpark: Washington Park
- City: Brooklyn, New York
- Record: 48–104 (.316)
- League place: 8th
- Owners: Charles Ebbets, Ferdinand Abell, Henry Medicus, Ned Hanlon
- President: Charles Ebbets
- Managers: Ned Hanlon

The 1905 Brooklyn Superbas fell to last place with a franchise-worst 48–104 record, costing manager Ned Hanlon his job.

== Offseason ==
- January 1905: Sammy Strang was purchased from the Superbas by the New York Giants.

== Regular season ==
=== Season standings ===
National League
Team	W	L	Pct.	GB	Home	Road
New York Giants	105	48	.686	—	54‍–‍21	51‍–‍27
Pittsburgh Pirates	96	57	.627	9	49‍–‍28	47‍–‍29
Chicago Cubs	92	61	.601	13	54‍–‍25	38‍–‍36
Philadelphia Phillies	83	69	.546	21½	39‍–‍36	44‍–‍33
Cincinnati Reds	79	74	.516	26	50‍–‍28	29‍–‍46
St. Louis Cardinals	58	96	.377	47½	32‍–‍45	26‍–‍51
Boston Beaneaters	51	103	.331	54½	29‍–‍46	22‍–‍57
Brooklyn Superbas	48	104	.316	56½	29‍–‍47	19‍–‍57

=== Record vs. opponents ===
1905 National League record Sources:
Team	BSN	BRO	CHC	CIN	NYG	PHI	PIT	STL
Boston	—	11–11–1	7–15	8–14	3–19	5–17–1	9–13	8–14
Brooklyn	11–11–1	—	6–16	4–18	7–15	3–18–1	7–14–1	10–12
Chicago	15–7	16–6	—	12–10	10–12	12–9–1	10–12–1	17–5
Cincinnati	14–8	18–4	10–12	—	5–16–2	13–9	9–13	10–12
New York	19–3	15–7	12–10	16–5–2	—	14–8	12–10	17–5
Philadelphia	17–5–1	18–3–1	9–12–1	9–13	8–14	—	6–16	16–6
Pittsburgh	13–9	14–7–1	12–10–1	13–9	10–12	16–6	—	18–4
St. Louis	14–8	12–10	5–17	12–10	5–17	6–16	4–18	—

=== Roster ===
1905 Brooklyn Superbas
Roster
Pitchers: Jack Doscher; Mal Eason; Oscar Jones; Harry McIntire; Fred Mitchell; Doc Reisling; Doc Scanlan; Elmer Stricklett	Catchers: Bill Bergen; Lew Ritter; Infielders: Charlie Babb; Emil Batch; Doc Gessler; John Hummel; Phil Lewis; Ed MacGamwell; Charlie Malay; Red Owens; Ad Yale	Outfielders: John Dobbs; Bob Hall; Harry Lumley; Jimmy Sheckard	Manager: Ned Hanlon

== Player stats ==
=== Batting ===
==== Starters by position ====
Note: Pos = Position; G = Games played; AB = At bats; R = Runs; H = Hits; Avg. = Batting average; HR = Home runs; RBI = Runs batted in; SB = Stolen bases

Pos	Player	G	AB	R	H	Avg.	HR	RBI	SB
C	Lew Ritter	92	311	32	68	.219	1	28	16
1B	Doc Gessler	126	431	44	125	.290	3	46	26
2B	Charlie Malay	102	349	33	88	.252	1	31	13
3B	Emil Batch	145	568	64	143	.252	5	49	21
SS	Phil Lewis	118	433	32	110	.254	3	33	16
OF	Harry Lumley	130	505	50	148	.293	7	47	22
OF	Jimmy Sheckard	130	480	58	140	.292	3	41	23
OF	John Dobbs	123	460	59	117	.254	2	36	15

==== Other batters ====
Note: G = Games played; AB = At bats; R = Runs; H = Hits; Avg. = Batting average; HR = Home runs; RBI = Runs batted in; SB = Stolen bases

Player	G	AB	R	H	Avg.	HR	RBI	SB
Bill Bergen	79	247	12	47	.190	0	22	4
Charlie Babb	75	235	27	44	.187	0	17	10
Bob Hall	56	203	21	48	.236	2	15	8
Red Owens	43	168	14	36	.214	1	20	1
John Hummel	30	109	19	29	.266	0	7	6
Fred Mitchell	27	79	4	15	.190	0	8	0
Ed MacGamwell	4	16	0	4	.250	0	0	0
Ad Yale	4	13	1	1	.077	0	1	0

=== Pitching ===
==== Starting pitchers ====
Note: G = Games pitched; GS = Games started; CG = Complete games; IP = Innings pitched; W = Wins; L = Losses; ERA = Earned run average; BB = Bases on balls; SO = Strikeouts

Player	G	GS	CG	IP	W	L	ERA	BB	SO
Harry McIntire	40	35	29	308.2	8	25	3.70	101	135
Doc Scanlan	33	28	22	249.2	14	12	2.92	104	135
Elmer Stricklett	33	28	25	237.1	9	18	3.34	71	77
Mal Eason	27	27	20	207.0	5	21	4.30	72	64
Oscar Jones	29	20	14	174.0	8	15	4.66	56	66
Fred Mitchell	12	10	9	96.1	3	7	4.76	38	44

==== Other pitchers ====
Note: G = Games pitched; GS = Games started; CG = Complete games; IP = Innings pitched; W = Wins; L = Losses; ERA = Earned run average; BB = Bases on balls; SO = Strikeouts

Player	G	GS	CG	IP	W	L	ERA	BB	SO
Jack Doscher	12	7	6	71.0	1	5	3.17	30	33

==== Relief pitchers ====
Note: G = Games pitched; IP = Innings pitched; W = Wins; L = Losses; SV = Saves; ERA = Earned run average; BB = Bases on balls; SO = Strikeouts

Player	G	IP	W	L	SV	ERA	BB	SO
Doc Reisling	2	3.0	0	1	0	3.00	4	2
