= 1905 Philadelphia Phillies season =

Major League Baseball season

1905 Philadelphia Phillies
- League: National League
- Ballpark: National League Park
- City: Philadelphia, Pennsylvania
- Owners: Bill Shettsline
- Managers: Hugh Duffy

The 1905 Philadelphia Phillies season was a season in Major League Baseball. The Phillies finished fourth in the National League with a record of 83 wins and 69 losses.

== Preseason ==
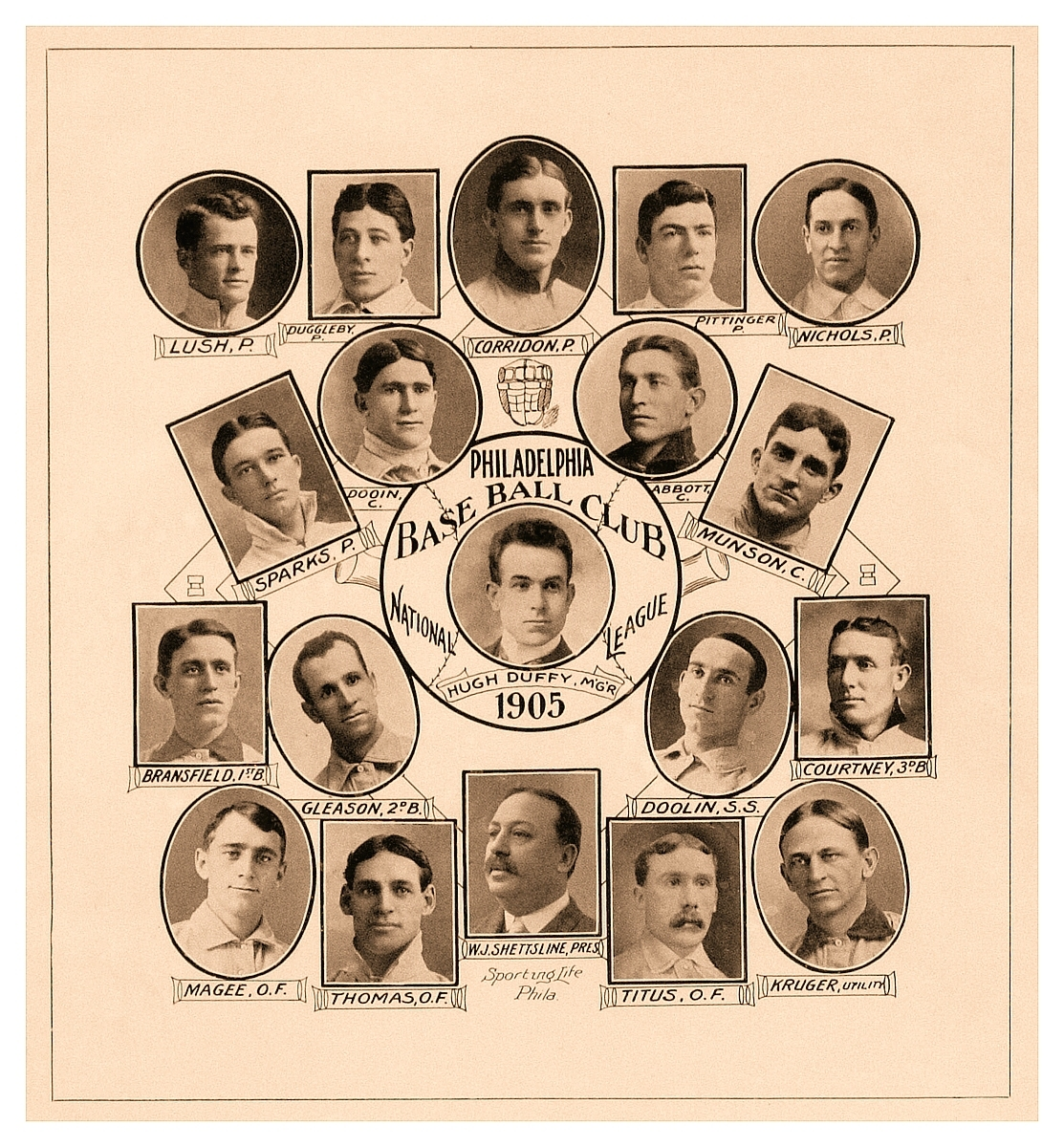
The 1905 Philadelphia Phillies

In 1905, the Phillies conducted spring training for a week in Augusta, Georgia at Warren Park, and then in Savannah, Georgia, where the team practiced and played exhibition games at Bolton Street Park. It was the second consecutive year the Phillies trained in Savannah.

=== 1905 Philadelphia City Series ===
The Phillies played eight games against the Philadelphia Athletics for the local championship in the pre-season city series. The Athletics and Phillies tied in the series, 4 games to 4.

Two games scheduled for April 5, 1905 at the Phillies' Philadelphia Ball Park, and for April 6, 1905 at the Athletics' Columbia Park were called off due to wet grounds.

AL Philadelphia Athletics (4) vs. NL Philadelphia Phillies (4)

Game	Date	Score	Location	Time	Attendance
1	April 1, 1905	Philadelphia Phillies – 0, Philadelphia Athletics – 4	Columbia Park	1:40	14,830
2	April 3, 1905	Philadelphia Athletics – 3, Philadelphia Phillies – 2	Philadelphia Ball Park	1:45	4,642
3	April 4, 1905	Philadelphia Phillies – 4, Philadelphia Athletics – 3	Columbia Park	1:40	2,451
4	April 7, 1905	Philadelphia Phillies – 1, Philadelphia Athletics – 6	Columbia Park	1:30	1,905
5	April 8, 1905	Philadelphia Athletics – 1, Philadelphia Phillies – 3	Philadelphia Ball Park	1:35	4,372
6	April 10, 1905	Philadelphia Athletics – 5, Philadelphia Phillies – 1	Philadelphia Ball Park	1:40	2,896
7	April 11, 1905	Philadelphia Phillies – 8, Philadelphia Athletics – 5	Columbia Park	1:45	1,874
8	April 12, 1905	Philadelphia Athletics – 0, Philadelphia Phillies – 5	Philadelphia Ball Park	1:40	1,975

The Phillies all-time record against the A's was 14–14 through 1905.

== Regular season ==
=== Season standings ===
National League
Team	W	L	Pct.	GB	Home	Road
New York Giants	105	48	.686	—	54‍–‍21	51‍–‍27
Pittsburgh Pirates	96	57	.627	9	49‍–‍28	47‍–‍29
Chicago Cubs	92	61	.601	13	54‍–‍25	38‍–‍36
Philadelphia Phillies	83	69	.546	21½	39‍–‍36	44‍–‍33
Cincinnati Reds	79	74	.516	26	50‍–‍28	29‍–‍46
St. Louis Cardinals	58	96	.377	47½	32‍–‍45	26‍–‍51
Boston Beaneaters	51	103	.331	54½	29‍–‍46	22‍–‍57
Brooklyn Superbas	48	104	.316	56½	29‍–‍47	19‍–‍57

=== Record vs. opponents ===
1905 National League record Sources:
Team	BSN	BRO	CHC	CIN	NYG	PHI	PIT	STL
Boston	—	11–11–1	7–15	8–14	3–19	5–17–1	9–13	8–14
Brooklyn	11–11–1	—	6–16	4–18	7–15	3–18–1	7–14–1	10–12
Chicago	15–7	16–6	—	12–10	10–12	12–9–1	10–12–1	17–5
Cincinnati	14–8	18–4	10–12	—	5–16–2	13–9	9–13	10–12
New York	19–3	15–7	12–10	16–5–2	—	14–8	12–10	17–5
Philadelphia	17–5–1	18–3–1	9–12–1	9–13	8–14	—	6–16	16–6
Pittsburgh	13–9	14–7–1	12–10–1	13–9	10–12	16–6	—	18–4
St. Louis	14–8	12–10	5–17	12–10	5–17	6–16	4–18	—

=== Roster ===
1905 Philadelphia Phillies
Roster
Pitchers: King Brady; Ralph Caldwell; Frank Corridon; Bill Duggleby; Harry Kane; Kid Nichols; Togie Pittinger; Tully Sparks; Jack Sutthoff; Buck Washer	Catchers: Fred Abbott; Red Dooin; Mike Kahoe; Red Munson; Infielders: Kitty Bransfield; Ernie Courtney; Mickey Doolan; Kid Gleason; Otto Krueger	Outfielders: Hugh Duffy; Johnny Lush; Sherry Magee; Roy Thomas; John Titus	Manager: Hugh Duffy

== Player stats ==
=== Batting ===
==== Starters by position ====
Note: Pos = Position; G = Games played; AB = At bats; H = Hits; Avg. = Batting average; HR = Home runs; RBI = Runs batted in

Pos	Player	G	AB	H	Avg.	HR	RBI
C	Red Dooin	113	380	95	.250	0	36
1B	Kitty Bransfield	151	580	150	.259	3	76
2B	Kid Gleason	155	608	150	.247	1	50
SS	Mickey Doolin	136	492	125	.254	1	48
3B	Ernie Courtney	155	601	165	.275	2	77
OF	Roy Thomas	147	562	178	.317	0	31
OF	Sherry Magee	155	603	180	.299	5	98
OF	John Titus	147	548	169	.308	2	89

==== Other batters ====
Note: G = Games played; AB = At bats; H = Hits; Avg. = Batting average; HR = Home runs; RBI = Runs batted in

Player	G	AB	H	Avg.	HR	RBI
Fred Abbott	42	128	25	.195	0	12
Otto Krueger	46	114	21	.184	0	12
Mike Kahoe	16	51	13	.255	0	4
Hugh Duffy	15	40	12	.300	0	3
Red Munson	9	26	3	.115	0	2
Johnny Lush	6	16	5	.313	0	1

=== Pitching ===
==== Starting pitchers ====
Note: G = Games pitched; IP = Innings pitched; W = Wins; L = Losses; ERA = Earned run average; SO = Strikeouts

Player	G	IP	W	L	ERA	SO
Togie Pittinger	46	337.1	23	14	3.09	136
Bill Duggleby	38	289.1	18	17	2.46	75
Tully Sparks	34	259.2	14	11	2.18	98
Frank Corridon	35	212.0	10	12	3.48	79
Kid Nichols	17	138.2	10	6	2.27	50
Johnny Lush	2	17.0	2	0	1.59	8
Harry Kane	2	17.0	1	1	1.59	12
King Brady	2	13.0	1	1	3.46	3

==== Other pitchers ====
Note: G = Games pitched; IP = Innings pitched; W = Wins; L = Losses; ERA = Earned run average; SO = Strikeouts

Player	G	IP	W	L	ERA	SO
Jack Sutthoff	13	77.2	3	4	3.62	26
Ralph Caldwell	7	34.0	1	3	4.24	29

==== Relief pitchers ====
Note: G = Games pitched; W = Wins; L = Losses; SV = Saves; ERA = Earned run average; SO = Strikeouts

Player	G	W	L	SV	ERA	SO
Buck Washer	1	0	0	0	6.00	0
