= Major League Baseball rosters =

List of allowed players

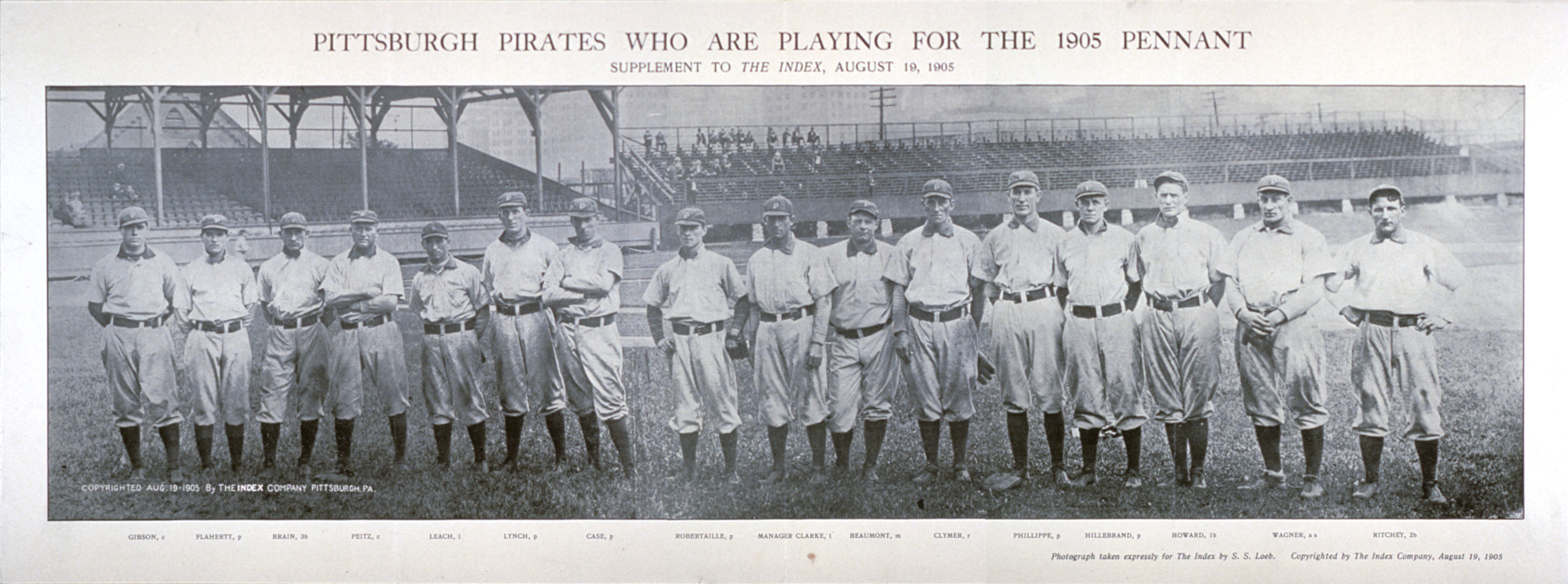
August 1905 photo of players on the Pittsburgh Pirates' roster.

A Major League Baseball roster is a list of players who are allowed, by league agreement, to play for a Major League Baseball (MLB) team. Each MLB team maintains two rosters: an active roster of players eligible to participate in an MLB game, and an expanded roster encompassing the active roster plus additional reserve players.

Beginning with the 2021 season, the active roster size is 26 players, and the expanded roster size is 40 players (the expanded roster is commonly referred to as the "40-man roster"). Historically, the active roster size was 25 players, with exceptions made in some seasons, most recently in 2020 when teams could have 28 active players.

== Active roster ==
Since 1910, when teams were first allowed to carry players under contract in excess of those allowed to participate in regular season games, the latter has been called the "active roster." With exceptions through the years for varying economic conditions (primarily during World War I, the Great Depression, post-World War II, and from 1986 to 1989 when the limit was set at 24 because of rising player salaries), the active roster has allowed up to 25 players to participate for a Major League team within specified dates, currently Opening Day to September 1. In 1968, the 25-player maximum for active rosters was made a part of the first collective bargaining agreement (CBA) between the major leagues and the Major League Baseball Players Association (MLBPA). Starting in 1977, teams were required to carry a minimum of 24 players on their active rosters as well.

Active rosters include the starting eight position players, starting pitching rotation, and reserve players on the team. Players on the active roster are also on the 40-man roster. These players are generally the only ones who dress in uniform and are the only ones who may take the field in a game at any time.

Typically, in modern-day play, an active roster will consist of five starting pitchers, eight relief pitchers, two catchers, six infielders, and five outfielders. Teams can vary this somewhat according to preference and circumstance, and indeed the "typical" roster makeup has changed somewhat over the years. (Starting rotations used to consist of four pitchers, not five, well into the 1970s; third-string catchers used to be much more common; many other minor variations exist.) A full-time designated hitter (DH) is usually classified as either an infielder or an outfielder, not a DH, because most DHs do play defensive positions from time to time.

Since 2012, teams have been allowed to carry one additional active player for "day-night" doubleheaders – two games scheduled on the same day, but with the stadium cleared between games, and separate tickets sold for each game – as long as the doubleheaders have been scheduled with at least 48 hours of advance notice. Teams are also allowed an additional active player for games played at neutral sites, such as the MLB Little League Classic.

=== Changes made in 2020 ===
On March 14, 2019, MLB and the MLBPA reached an agreement on midterm changes to the then-current CBA, with the changes officially unveiled on February 12, 2020. Two significant changes were announced, which were planned to take effect during the 2020 season:

==== 26-man roster ====
Under the agreement, teams would be allowed 26-man active rosters from the start of the season through August 31, as well as the postseason. From September 1 to the end of the regular season, two additional players (28 total) would be active. Teams would be limited to carrying 13 pitchers, except from September 1 to the end of the regular season, when this limit would increase to 14. Prior conditions that allowed an extra active player (such as day-night doubleheaders) would persist, with the extra player not counting against the limit for pitchers.

==== Restrictions on position players pitching ====
The agreement also introduced a playing rule placing severe limits on pitching by position players. Each team must designate players as either "position players" or "pitchers" before the start of the season, and that designation cannot be changed during the season. Only players who are designated as "pitchers" will be allowed to pitch in any regular-season or postseason game, with the following exceptions:

- One team is ahead by at least 7 runs when the player has assumed a pitching role.
- The game is in extra innings.
- The player serving as pitcher has earned the status of "two-way player".

A player earns two-way status by satisfying both of the following criteria, in either the current season or the immediately preceding season:

- Pitching at least 20 MLB innings.
- Playing in at least 20 MLB games as a position player or designated hitter, with at least three plate appearances in each of the 20 games.

For the 2020 season only, a player who met the above qualifications in either 2018 or 2019 would be considered a two-way player.

==== Delayed implementation ====
Due to the impact of the COVID-19 pandemic on the 2020 season, the planned changes were deferred. Teams were allowed to begin the shortened season with 30 active players, and were allowed to have 28 active players from early August through the postseason.

For the 2021 season, the 26-man active roster size took effect; however, the roster limit of 13 pitchers was waived, as were restrictions on position players pitching. The 13-pitcher limit, two-way player rule, and restrictions on position players pitching finally went into effect during the 2022 season.

== Expanded roster ==
Also called the "40-man roster", the expanded roster is composed of all the players in a Major League club's organization who are signed to a major-league contract. The 40-man roster limit has been in effect since 1921, except for 1945 and 1946 when it was raised to 48 to accommodate the number of returning players whose careers had been interrupted by military service in World War II, from 1962 to 1965 when it was raised to 41 to add a reserve spot for first-year players acquired before implementation of a player draft was approved prior to the 1965 season, and in 1994 for a strike that canceled the remainder of that season.

The expanded roster includes all players who are eligible for call-up to the active roster at any given time. Also on the 40-man roster are any players on the 10-day (for position players) or 15-day (for pitchers) injured list (known as the "disabled list" prior to the 2019 season) and minor league players who are signed to a major-league contract but are on an "optional assignment" to the minors (each player has three "option years" to be sent to the minors once on the expanded roster before he must be placed on waivers to be sent there). A player who is on the 40-man roster but is later placed on the 60-day injured list is removed from the 40-man roster until his time on the injured list is over. The same applies to players who are suspended. Because players on the 60-day injured list are taken off the 40-man roster with no risk of losing the player, MLB teams often transfer injured players from the 10-day or 15-day injured lists to the 60-day injured list so that the team can add another player to the 40-man roster without having to put a player through the designated for assignment (DFA) process. DFA is the removal of a player from the expanded roster; the team has seven days to trade the player, release him, or send him to the minor leagues.

=== September call-ups ===
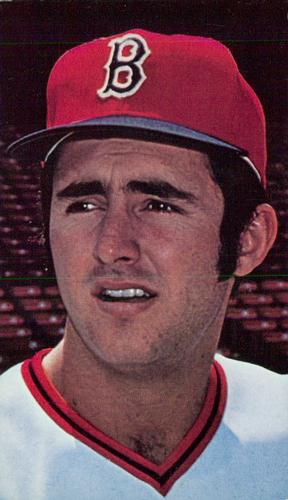
Fred Lynn made his MLB debut as a September call up in 1974; he was later the American League's Rookie of the Year and MVP in 1975.

September call-ups are players who, historically, were added to MLB rosters late in the season.

==== Historical practice ====
Through the 2019 season, every MLB team's roster expanded on September 1 from the 25-man active roster to the entire 40-man roster. Thus, any player on the expanded roster on September 1 or later could play for the MLB team through the end of the regular season.

September call-ups were often younger players who were being given major league experience and, especially for teams in playoff contention, players who could provide positional depth, such as a third catcher or additional relief pitchers. In practice, teams usually did not have the entire 40-man roster on hand for games; typically, clubs would have about six additional players available over the usual limit of 25. There were exceptions – for example; during the 2018 season, the Los Angeles Dodgers and Philadelphia Phillies used their full rosters, and in 2019 the Boston Red Sox carried 36 players (including 21 pitchers). In 2003, the Montreal Expos were contending for the National League wild card berth, and in what many people deemed to be a conflict of interest, Major League Baseball, which owned the Expos at the time, refused to allow them to call any players up, claiming they could not afford the additional expenses, yet the following season with the Expos out of contention, September call ups were allowed.

During the final years of the 40-man active roster, one perceived problem was that teams were allowed to carry any number of players between 25 and 40 on their September rosters. Shortly after the decision to curtail September roster expansion was announced, former Milwaukee Brewers general manager Doug Melvin, who had advocated changes to September roster rules for more than a decade, made the following remarks to a USA Today writer:

I think people got sick of me talking about it, but it was about the integrity of the game.... It got to be such a huge imbalance. It would be one thing if teams just had a couple of more players than the other team in September, but we were seeing differences by more than 10 players a game. To me, it was destroying the integrity of it. No other sport has uneven rosters at any point in the season, and we were doing it [in] the pennant race.

==== Current practice ====
From 2020 forward, expanding the active roster late in the season so it is equivalent to the expanded roster has been eliminated. Each team is still allowed to have up to 40 players under major-league contracts, and active rosters are now normally 26 players, with a limited expansion—to 28 players—from September 1 through the end of the regular season. Additionally, all teams are now required to have 28 players on their active rosters after August 31—they cannot carry a lower number of players. Adjustments to these limits may be implemented by MLB, such as during the delayed and shortened 2020 season, when teams were allowed to begin the season with 30 players on their active rosters.

== Postseason roster ==
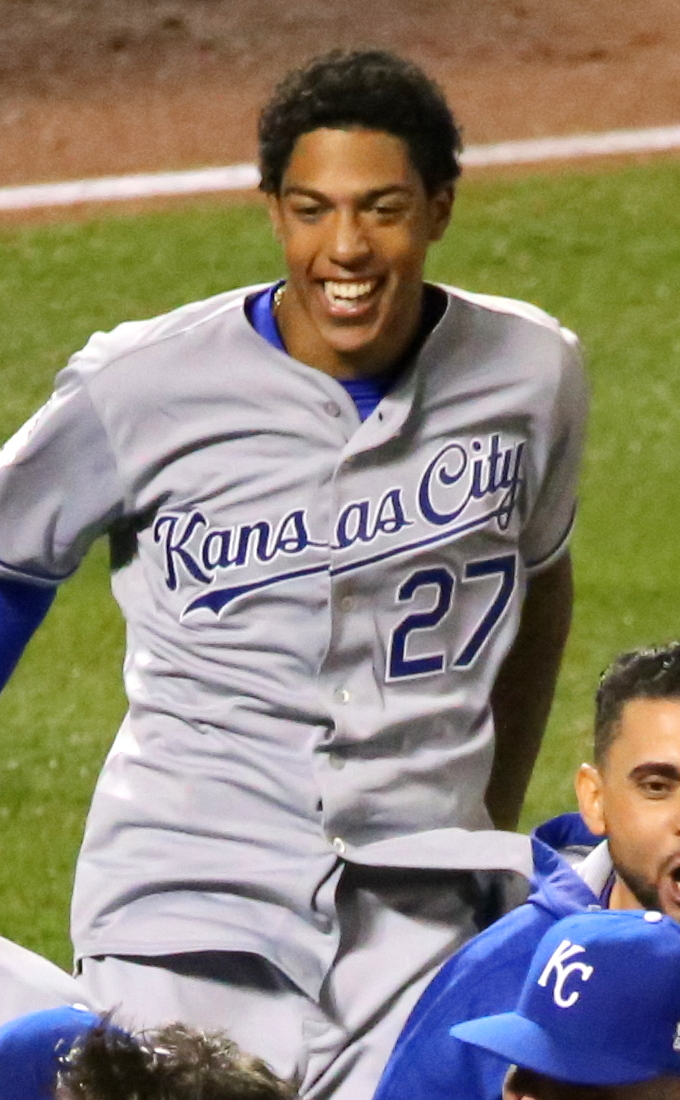
Adalberto Mondesí made his MLB debut during the 2015 World Series, the only player in MLB history to do so.

A postseason roster takes effect only if a team clinches a playoff berth. Players who are part of the team's final roster at the end of the regular season are eligible to participate in the postseason. Any player who has been traded from a different team, spent time in the Minor Leagues, or signed later in the season with the team (no later than August 31) is eligible to participate in the postseason; players who are suspended for drug use are not allowed to participate in the postseason. From 2020, a postseason roster is allowed up to 26 active players (up from 25 through 2019), with a maximum of 13 pitchers (new for 2020); qualifying two-way players do not count against the limit on pitchers. Other players who are not on the 26-man active roster will be assigned to the postseason secondary squad. Players who are on the injured list or any other non-active transaction by the end of the regular season will have their transactions passed on in the postseason. Rosters for a series are set at the beginning of the series and no changes to the 26-man active roster are allowed except when a player is moved to the injured list or any other inactive transaction. If a player is moved to the injured list or another inactive transaction during a series, he then becomes ineligible to be returned to the 26-man active roster for the remainder of the series as well as the next series if applicable. If any player goes on any inactive transaction, any player from the 40-man roster can be promoted to the 26-man active roster for the remainder of the series if applicable.

For a player to be eligible for the postseason active roster, he must have either been on his club's expanded roster or injured list as of midnight (ET) on August 31 of that year and not placed on the 60-day injured list after August 1. The one exception is for replacing players on the injured list. Since the 2014 season, an injured player eligible for postseason play may be replaced by any player within his club's organization, including players assigned to the club's minor league affiliates who are not on the major league 40-man roster. Prior to 2014, only players who were on a club's 40-man roster (including those added to the expanded roster after August 31, who would not otherwise be eligible for the postseason) at the conclusion of the regular season were eligible to replace injured players on postseason rosters. The 2015 Kansas City Royals were the first club to exploit this new provision when they added Adalberto Mondesí – who at the time was assigned to the Royals' Double-A affiliate and was not on the 40-man roster – to their World Series roster.

== Non-roster players ==
All other professional players affiliated with Major League Baseball are signed to minor-league contracts. They can receive an invitation to spring training with their organization's Major League team without being on the 40-man roster. Two types of players generally receive a non-roster invitation: prospect players who are there to gain experience and face tougher competition as well as receive instruction from the Major League team's coaching staff; and veteran players who were not offered any major league contract by a club. The veteran player is usually signed to a "two-way" salary option – one for their time in the minors and another if they are placed on the 40-man during the season. All spring training invitees are under some sort of contract, to avoid liability if an injury were to occur to the player.

== All-Star roster ==
Since 1933, an annual Major League Baseball All-Star Game has been played at approximately the mid-point of each season, except for 1945 and 2020. The game features an American League team versus a National League team. The number of players on All-Star rosters has varied; since 2010, there are 34 players on each league's roster.

== See also ==
- Bonus rule
- Phantom ballplayer
- Major League Baseball transactions
- List of Major League Baseball team rosters
