= 1905 Cincinnati Reds season =

1905 Cincinnati Reds
- League: National League
- Ballpark: Palace of the Fans
- City: Cincinnati, Ohio
- Owners: Garry Herrmann
- Managers: Joe Kelley

The 1905 Cincinnati Reds season was a season in American baseball. The team finished fifth in the National League with a record of 79 wins and 74 losses, 26 games behind the New York Giants.

== Regular season ==
The Reds were coming off a third-place finish in 1904, as they went 88–65, eighteen games behind the powerful New York Giants. The 88 wins by Cincinnati was their highest total since 1898.

Player-manager Joe Kelley returned for his fourth season. Kelley moved from first base to the outfield, as the Reds acquired first baseman Shad Barry from the Chicago Cubs very early in the 1905 season. Some other new faces on the team included pitcher Orval Overall, who went 32–25 with a 2.78 ERA in 56 starts with the Tacoma Tigers of the Pacific Coast League in 1904, and pitcher Charlie Chech, who joined Cincinnati from the St. Paul Saints of the American Association. Chech had a 27–8 record in 35 starts.

Cy Seymour had a career season, leading the National League with a .377 batting average, 219 hits, 40 doubles, 21 triples, and driving in 121 runs. Seymour also had eight home runs, second on the club. Fred Odwell led Cincinnati with nine home runs, while he had a .241 average and drove in 65 runs. Miller Huggins hit .273 with a homer and 38 RBI, while scoring a team best 117 runs and walking 103 times. Tommy Corcoran hit only .248, but he had two homers and drove in 85 runs. Barry also played well following his trade from the Cubs, hitting .324 with a homer and 56 RBI with Cincinnati.

With Noodles Hahn missing most of the season due to an injury, Bob Ewing emerged as the ace, going 20–11 with a 2.51 ERA. Orval Overall went 18–23 with a 2.86 ERA in 39 starts in his rookie season, while Charlie Chech went 14–14 with a 2.89 ERA in his first season. In limited action, Hahn was 5–3 with a 2.81 ERA in thirteen games, eight of them starts.

=== Season summary ===
The Reds got off to a bad start in 1905, going 12–16 in their opening twenty-eight games, sitting in fifth place, 10.5 games behind the New York Giants. To make matters worse, the Reds lost ace pitcher Noodles Hahn to an arm injury. Cincinnati stayed around the .500 mark until going on an eight-game winning streak to up their record to 32–24, and found themselves in third place, 6.5 games back. The team then won only three of thirteen games to fall back into fifth, 14.5 games behind the Giants. The Reds played out the rest of the season in fifth place, as they finished with a 79–74 record, 26 games behind New York.

=== Season standings ===
National League
Team	W	L	Pct.	GB	Home	Road
New York Giants	105	48	.686	—	54‍–‍21	51‍–‍27
Pittsburgh Pirates	96	57	.627	9	49‍–‍28	47‍–‍29
Chicago Cubs	92	61	.601	13	54‍–‍25	38‍–‍36
Philadelphia Phillies	83	69	.546	21½	39‍–‍36	44‍–‍33
Cincinnati Reds	79	74	.516	26	50‍–‍28	29‍–‍46
St. Louis Cardinals	58	96	.377	47½	32‍–‍45	26‍–‍51
Boston Beaneaters	51	103	.331	54½	29‍–‍46	22‍–‍57
Brooklyn Superbas	48	104	.316	56½	29‍–‍47	19‍–‍57

=== Record vs. opponents ===
1905 National League record Sources:
Team	BSN	BRO	CHC	CIN	NYG	PHI	PIT	STL
Boston	—	11–11–1	7–15	8–14	3–19	5–17–1	9–13	8–14
Brooklyn	11–11–1	—	6–16	4–18	7–15	3–18–1	7–14–1	10–12
Chicago	15–7	16–6	—	12–10	10–12	12–9–1	10–12–1	17–5
Cincinnati	14–8	18–4	10–12	—	5–16–2	13–9	9–13	10–12
New York	19–3	15–7	12–10	16–5–2	—	14–8	12–10	17–5
Philadelphia	17–5–1	18–3–1	9–12–1	9–13	8–14	—	6–16	16–6
Pittsburgh	13–9	14–7–1	12–10–1	13–9	10–12	16–6	—	18–4
St. Louis	14–8	12–10	5–17	12–10	5–17	6–16	4–18	—

=== Roster ===
1905 Cincinnati Reds
Roster
Pitchers: Ernie Baker; Charlie Chech; Bob Ewing; Noodles Hahn; Jack Harper; Ollie Johns; Orval Overall; Rip Vowinkel; Tom Walker	Catchers: Ed Phelps; Admiral Schlei; Gabby Street; Infielders: Shad Barry; Cliff Blankenship; Al Bridwell; Tommy Corcoran; Cozy Dolan; Miller Huggins; Mike Mowrey; Harry Steinfeldt	Outfielders: Bill Hinchman; Joe Kelley; Fred Odwell; Jimmy Sebring; Cy Seymour; Johnny Siegle	Manager: Joe Kelley

== Player stats ==
=== Batting ===
==== Starters by position ====
Note: Pos = Position; G = Games played; AB = At bats; H = Hits; Avg. = Batting average; HR = Home runs; RBI = Runs batted in

Pos	Player	G	AB	H	Avg.	HR	RBI
C	Admiral Schlei	99	314	71	.226	1	36
1B	Shad Barry	125	494	160	.324	1	56
2B	Miller Huggins	149	564	154	.273	1	38
SS	Tommy Corcoran	151	605	150	.248	2	85
3B	Harry Steinfeldt	114	384	104	.271	1	39
OF	Cy Seymour	149	581	219	.377	8	121
OF	Fred Odwell	130	468	113	.241	9	65
OF	Joe Kelley	90	321	89	.277	1	37

==== Other batters ====
Note: G = Games played; AB = At bats; H = Hits; Avg. = Batting average; HR = Home runs; RBI = Runs batted in

Player	G	AB	H	Avg.	HR	RBI
Al Bridwell	82	254	64	.252	0	17
Jimmy Sebring	58	217	62	.286	2	28
Ed Phelps	44	156	36	.231	0	18
Gabby Street	31	93	23	.247	0	8
Cozy Dolan	22	77	18	.234	0	4
Cliff Blankenship	19	56	11	.196	0	7
Johnny Siegle	17	56	17	.304	1	8
Bill Hinchman	17	51	13	.255	0	10
Mike Mowrey	7	30	8	.267	0	6

=== Pitching ===
==== Starting pitchers ====
Note: G = Games pitched; IP = Innings pitched; W = Wins; L = Losses; ERA = Earned run average; SO = Strikeouts

Player	G	IP	W	L	ERA	SO
Orval Overall	42	318.0	18	23	2.86	173
Bob Ewing	40	311.2	20	11	2.51	164
Jack Harper	26	179.1	9	13	3.86	70
Tom Walker	23	144.2	9	7	3.24	28
Rip Vowinkel	6	45.1	3	3	4.17	7

==== Other pitchers ====
Note: G = Games pitched; IP = Innings pitched; W = Wins; L = Losses; ERA = Earned run average; SO = Strikeouts

Player	G	IP	W	L	ERA	SO
Charlie Chech	39	267.2	14	14	2.89	79
Noodles Hahn	13	77.0	5	3	2.81	17
Ollie Johns	4	18.0	1	0	3.50	8

==== Relief pitchers ====
Note: G = Games pitched; W = Wins; L = Losses; SV = Saves; ERA = Earned run average; SO = Strikeouts

Player	G	W	L	SV	ERA	SO
Ernie Baker	1	0	0	0	4.50	1
