= 1905 New York Giants season =

Major League Baseball season

1905 New York Giants
- World Series champions National League champions
- League: National League
- Ballpark: Polo Grounds
- City: New York City
- Record: 105–48 (.686)
- League place: 1st
- Owners: John T. Brush
- Managers: John McGraw

The 1905 New York Giants season was the franchise's 23rd season, and the team won their second consecutive National League pennant. They beat the Philadelphia Athletics in the World Series.

== Regular season ==
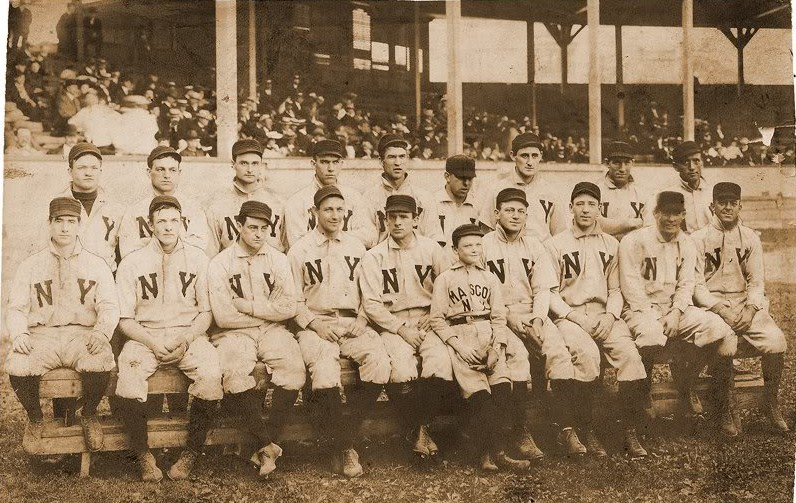
1905 New York Giants

This team featured three Hall of Fame players – catcher Roger Bresnahan, and pitchers Christy Mathewson and Joe McGinnity – along with Hall of Fame manager John McGraw. Mathewson won the pitching triple crown and then had one of the greatest World Series performances of all-time, with three shutouts in six days. Only six men pitched for the Giants in 1905. The offense, led by "Turkey" Mike Donlin, scored the most runs in the majors.

On June 29, Archie "Moonlight" Graham, made famous through the novel Shoeless Joe and subsequent movie Field of Dreams, made his lone major league appearance.

=== Season standings ===
National League
| Team | W | L | Pct. | GB | Home | Road |
|---|---|---|---|---|---|---|
| New York Giants | 105 | 48 | .686 | — | 54‍–‍21 | 51‍–‍27 |
| Pittsburgh Pirates | 96 | 57 | .627 | 9 | 49‍–‍28 | 47‍–‍29 |
| Chicago Cubs | 92 | 61 | .601 | 13 | 54‍–‍25 | 38‍–‍36 |
| Philadelphia Phillies | 83 | 69 | .546 | 21½ | 39‍–‍36 | 44‍–‍33 |
| Cincinnati Reds | 79 | 74 | .516 | 26 | 50‍–‍28 | 29‍–‍46 |
| St. Louis Cardinals | 58 | 96 | .377 | 47½ | 32‍–‍45 | 26‍–‍51 |
| Boston Beaneaters | 51 | 103 | .331 | 54½ | 29‍–‍46 | 22‍–‍57 |
| Brooklyn Superbas | 48 | 104 | .316 | 56½ | 29‍–‍47 | 19‍–‍57 |

=== Record vs. opponents ===
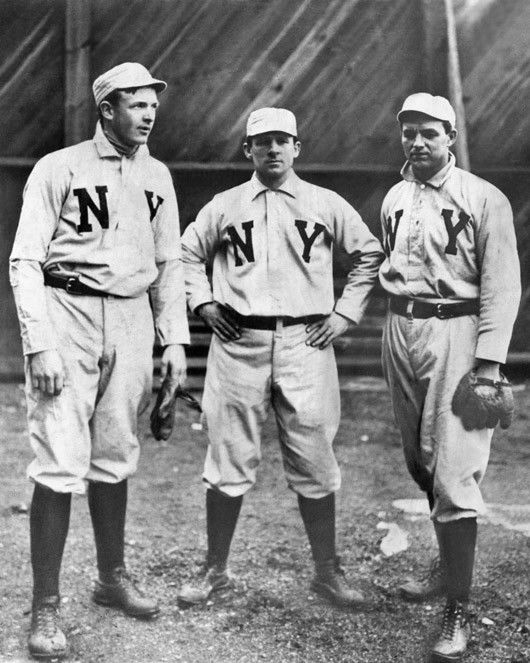
Christy Mathewson, John McGraw, and Joe McGinnity in 1905

1905 National League record Sources:
| Team | BSN | BRO | CHC | CIN | NYG | PHI | PIT | STL |
|---|---|---|---|---|---|---|---|---|
| Boston | — | 11–11–1 | 7–15 | 8–14 | 3–19 | 5–17–1 | 9–13 | 8–14 |
| Brooklyn | 11–11–1 | — | 6–16 | 4–18 | 7–15 | 3–18–1 | 7–14–1 | 10–12 |
| Chicago | 15–7 | 16–6 | — | 12–10 | 10–12 | 12–9–1 | 10–12–1 | 17–5 |
| Cincinnati | 14–8 | 18–4 | 10–12 | — | 5–16–2 | 13–9 | 9–13 | 10–12 |
| New York | 19–3 | 15–7 | 12–10 | 16–5–2 | — | 14–8 | 12–10 | 17–5 |
| Philadelphia | 17–5–1 | 18–3–1 | 9–12–1 | 9–13 | 8–14 | — | 6–16 | 16–6 |
| Pittsburgh | 13–9 | 14–7–1 | 12–10–1 | 13–9 | 10–12 | 16–6 | — | 18–4 |
| St. Louis | 14–8 | 12–10 | 5–17 | 12–10 | 5–17 | 6–16 | 4–18 | — |

=== Roster ===
1905 New York Giants
Roster
| Pitchers: Red Ames; Claude Elliott; Christy Mathewson; Joe McGinnity; Dummy Taylor; Hooks Wiltse; Catchers: Frank Bowerman; Roger Bresnahan | Infielders: Boileryard Clarke; Bill Dahlen; Art Devlin; Billy Gilbert; Dan McGann; Offa Neal; Sammy Strang | Outfielders: George Browne; Mike Donlin; Moonlight Graham; Bob Hall; John McGraw; Sam Mertes | Manager: John McGraw |

== Player stats ==
| = Indicates team leader |

=== Batting ===
==== Starters by position ====
Note: Pos = Position; G = Games played; AB = At bats; H = Hits; Avg. = Batting average; HR = Home runs; RBI = Runs batted in

| Pos | Player | G | AB | H | Avg. | HR | RBI |
|---|---|---|---|---|---|---|---|
| C | Roger Bresnahan | 104 | 331 | 100 | .302 | 0 | 46 |
| 1B | Dan McGann | 136 | 491 | 147 | .299 | 5 | 75 |
| 2B | Billy Gilbert | 115 | 376 | 93 | .247 | 0 | 24 |
| 3B | Art Devlin | 153 | 525 | 129 | .246 | 2 | 61 |
| SS | Bill Dahlen | 148 | 520 | 126 | .242 | 7 | 81 |
| OF | Mike Donlin | 150 | 606 | 216 | .356 | 7 | 80 |
| OF | George Browne | 127 | 536 | 157 | .293 | 4 | 43 |
| OF | Sam Mertes | 150 | 551 | 154 | .279 | 5 | 108 |

==== Other batters ====
Note: G = Games played; AB = At bats; H = Hits; Avg. = Batting average; HR = Home runs; RBI = Runs batted in

| Player | G | AB | H | Avg. | HR | RBI |
|---|---|---|---|---|---|---|
| Frank Bowerman | 98 | 297 | 80 | .269 | 3 | 41 |
| Sammy Strang | 111 | 294 | 76 | .259 | 3 | 29 |
| Boileryard Clarke | 31 | 50 | 9 | .180 | 1 | 4 |
| Offa Neal | 4 | 13 | 0 | .000 | 0 | 0 |
| Bob Hall | 1 | 3 | 1 | .333 | 0 | 0 |
| Moonlight Graham | 1 | 0 | 0 | ---- | 0 | 0 |
| John McGraw | 3 | 0 | 0 | ---- | 0 | 0 |

=== Pitching ===
==== Starting pitchers ====
Note: G = Games pitched; IP = Innings pitched; W = Wins; L = Losses; ERA = Earned run average; SO = Strikeouts

| Player | G | IP | W | L | ERA | SO |
|---|---|---|---|---|---|---|
| Christy Mathewson | 43 | 338.2 | 31 | 9 | 1.28 | 206 |
| Joe McGinnity | 46 | 320.1 | 21 | 15 | 2.87 | 125 |
| Red Ames | 34 | 262.2 | 22 | 8 | 2.74 | 198 |
| Dummy Taylor | 32 | 213.1 | 16 | 9 | 2.66 | 91 |
| Hooks Wiltse | 32 | 197.0 | 15 | 6 | 2.47 | 120 |

==== Relief pitchers ====
Note: G = Games pitched; W = Wins; L = Losses; SV = Saves; ERA = Earned run average; SO = Strikeouts

| Player | G | W | L | SV | ERA | SO |
|---|---|---|---|---|---|---|
| Claude Elliott | 10 | 0 | 1 | 6 | 4.03 | 20 |

== Awards and honors ==
=== League top five finishers ===
Red Ames

- #2 in NL in strikeouts (198)
- #3 in NL in wins (22)

Art Devlin

- MLB leader in stolen bases (59)

Mike Donlin

- MLB leader in runs scored (124)
- #3 in NL in batting average (.356)
- #3 in NL in slugging percentage (.495)

Christy Mathewson

- MLB leader in wins (31)
- MLB leader in ERA (1.28)
- NL leader in strikeouts (206)

Joe McGinnity

- #4 in NL in wins (21)

Sam Mertes

- #2 in NL in RBI (108)
- #4 in NL in stolen bases (52)

== 1905 World Series ==
NL New York Giants (4) vs AL Philadelphia Athletics (1)

| Game | Score | Date | Location | Attendance |
|---|---|---|---|---|
| 1 | New York Giants – 3, Philadelphia Athletics – 0 | October 9 | Columbia Park | 17,995 |
| 2 | Philadelphia Athletics – 3, New York Giants – 0 | October 10 | Polo Grounds | 24,992 |
| 3 | New York Giants – 9, Philadelphia Athletics – 0 | October 12 | Columbia Park | 10,991 |
| 4 | Philadelphia Athletics – 0, New York Giants – 1 | October 13 | Polo Grounds | 13,598 |
| 5 | Philadelphia Athletics – 0, New York Giants – 2 | October 14 | Polo Grounds | 24,187 |
