= 1905 Chicago Cubs season =

1905 Chicago Cubs
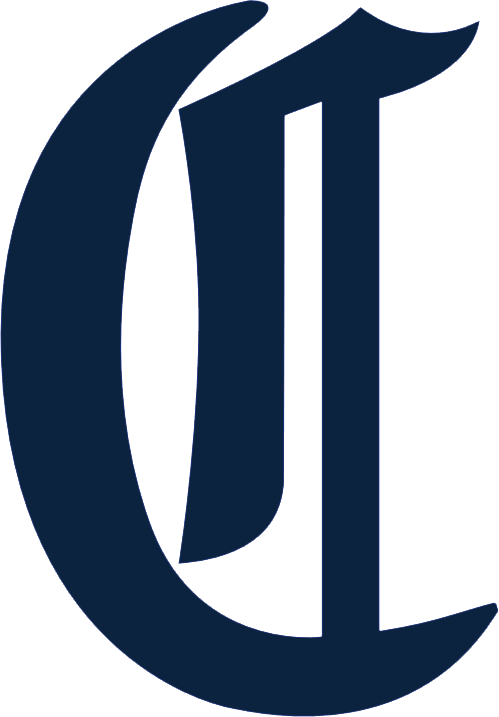
- League: National League
- Ballpark: West Side Park
- City: Chicago
- Record: 92–61 (.601)
- League place: 3rd
- Owners: James Hart, Charles Murphy
- Managers: Frank Selee, Frank Chance

The 1905 Chicago Cubs season was the 34th season of the Chicago Cubs franchise, the 30th in the National League and the 13th at West Side Park. The Cubs finished third in the National League with a record of 92–61.

== Regular season ==
=== Season standings ===
National League
Team	W	L	Pct.	GB	Home	Road
New York Giants	105	48	.686	—	54‍–‍21	51‍–‍27
Pittsburgh Pirates	96	57	.627	9	49‍–‍28	47‍–‍29
Chicago Cubs	92	61	.601	13	54‍–‍25	38‍–‍36
Philadelphia Phillies	83	69	.546	21½	39‍–‍36	44‍–‍33
Cincinnati Reds	79	74	.516	26	50‍–‍28	29‍–‍46
St. Louis Cardinals	58	96	.377	47½	32‍–‍45	26‍–‍51
Boston Beaneaters	51	103	.331	54½	29‍–‍46	22‍–‍57
Brooklyn Superbas	48	104	.316	56½	29‍–‍47	19‍–‍57

=== Record vs. opponents ===
1905 National League record Sources:
Team	BSN	BRO	CHC	CIN	NYG	PHI	PIT	STL
Boston	—	11–11–1	7–15	8–14	3–19	5–17–1	9–13	8–14
Brooklyn	11–11–1	—	6–16	4–18	7–15	3–18–1	7–14–1	10–12
Chicago	15–7	16–6	—	12–10	10–12	12–9–1	10–12–1	17–5
Cincinnati	14–8	18–4	10–12	—	5–16–2	13–9	9–13	10–12
New York	19–3	15–7	12–10	16–5–2	—	14–8	12–10	17–5
Philadelphia	17–5–1	18–3–1	9–12–1	9–13	8–14	—	6–16	16–6
Pittsburgh	13–9	14–7–1	12–10–1	13–9	10–12	16–6	—	18–4
St. Louis	14–8	12–10	5–17	12–10	5–17	6–16	4–18	—

=== Roster ===
1905 Chicago Cubs
Roster
Pitchers: Buttons Briggs; Mordecai Brown; Carl Lundgren; Big Jeff Pfeffer; Ed Reulbach; Jake Weimer; Bob Wicker	Catchers: Johnny Kling; Jack O'Neill; Infielders: Shad Barry; Doc Casey; Frank Chance; Johnny Evers; Solly Hofman; Hans Lobert; Joe Tinker	Outfielders: Billy Maloney; Jack McCarthy; Wildfire Schulte; Jimmy Slagle	Manager: Frank Chance; Frank Selee

== Player stats ==
=== Batting ===
==== Starters by position ====
Note: Pos = Position; G = Games played; AB = At bats; H = Hits; Avg. = Batting average; HR = Home runs; RBI = Runs batted in

Pos	Player	G	AB	H	Avg.	HR	RBI
C	Johnny Kling	111	380	83	.218	1	52
1B	Frank Chance	118	392	124	.316	2	70
2B	Johnny Evers	99	340	94	.276	1	37
SS	Joe Tinker	149	547	135	.247	2	66
3B	Doc Casey	144	526	122	.232	1	56
OF	Billy Maloney	145	558	145	.260	2	56
OF	Jimmy Slagle	155	568	153	.269	0	37
OF	Frank Schulte	123	493	135	.274	1	47

==== Other batters ====
Note: G = Games played; AB = At bats; H = Hits; Avg. = Batting average; HR = Home runs; RBI = Runs batted in

Player	G	AB	H	Avg.	HR	RBI
Solly Hofman	86	287	68	.237	1	38
Jack O'Neill	53	172	34	.198	0	12
Jack McCarthy	59	170	47	.276	0	14
Shad Barry	27	104	22	.212	0	10
Hans Lobert	14	46	9	.196	0	1

=== Pitching ===
==== Starting pitchers ====
Note: G = Games pitched; IP = Innings pitched; W = Wins; L = Losses; ERA = Earned run average; SO = Strikeouts

Player	G	IP	W	L	ERA	SO
Ed Reulbach	34	291.2	18	14	1.42	152
Jake Weimer	33	250.1	18	12	2.26	107
Mordecai Brown	30	249.0	18	12	2.17	89
Bob Wicker	22	178.0	13	6	2.02	86
Carl Lundgren	23	169.1	13	5	2.23	69
Buttons Briggs	20	168.0	8	8	2.14	68
Big Jeff Pfeffer	15	101.0	4	4	2.50	56
