= Ralph Caldwell =

American baseball player (1884-1969)

- Pitcher
- Born: January 18, 1884; Philadelphia, Pennsylvania, U.S.
- Died: August 5, 1969 (aged 85); West Trenton, New Jersey, U.S.
- Batted: Left Threw: Left

MLB debut
- September 10, 1904, for the Philadelphia Phillies

Last MLB appearance
- July 5, 1905, for the Philadelphia Phillies

MLB statistics
- Win–loss record: 3–5
- Earned run average: 4.20
- Strikeouts: 59
- Stats at Baseball Reference

Teams
- Philadelphia Phillies (1904–1905)

Ralph Grant "Lefty" Caldwell (January 18, 1884 – August 5, 1969) was an American pitcher in Major League Baseball. He was 5'9" and weighed 155 pounds.

== Biography ==
Caldwell was born in Philadelphia, Pennsylvania, in 1884. He entered the University of Pennsylvania in 1902 and played on the school's baseball team in 1903 and 1904. He graduated in 1907.

Caldwell made his professional baseball debut for the National League's Philadelphia Phillies on September 10, 1904. In six appearances that season, he went 2–2 with a 4.17 earned run average. He also went 8 for 18 at the plate for a .444 batting average. The following season, he went 1–3 with a 4.24 ERA in seven appearances for the Phillies. He went 0 for 15 at the plate. His final major league game was on July 5, 1905. During the 1905 season, he also played for the Eastern League's Toronto Maple Leafs.

Caldwell died in West Trenton, New Jersey, in 1969 and was buried in Ewing Church Cemetery.
