= Jim McGinley =

American baseball player (1878–1961)

- Pitcher
- Born: October 2, 1878; Groveland, Massachusetts, U.S.
- Died: September 20, 1961 (aged 82); Haverhill, Massachusetts, U.S.
- Batted: Right Threw: Right

MLB debut
- September 22, 1904, for the St. Louis Cardinals

Last MLB appearance
- May 5, 1905, for the St. Louis Cardinals

MLB statistics
- Win–loss record: 2–2
- Earned run average: 3.30
- Strikeouts: 6
- Stats at Baseball Reference

Teams
- St. Louis Cardinals (1904–1905)

James William McGinley (October 2, 1878 – September 20, 1961) was an American pitcher in Major League Baseball.
