= Cy Seymour =

American baseball player (1872–1919)

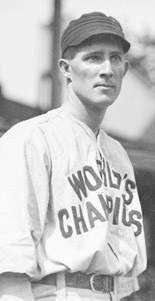
- Center fielder / Pitcher
- Born: December 9, 1872; Albany, New York, U.S.
- Died: September 20, 1919 (aged 46); New York, New York, U.S.
- Batted: Left Threw: Left

MLB debut
- April 22, 1896, for the New York Giants

Last MLB appearance
- July 17, 1913, for the Boston Braves

MLB statistics
- Batting average: .303
- Home runs: 52
- Runs batted in: 799
- Win–loss record: 61–56
- Earned run average: 3.73
- Strikeouts: 591
- Stats at Baseball Reference

Teams
- New York Giants (1896–1900); Baltimore Orioles (1901–1902); Cincinnati Reds (1902–1906); New York Giants (1906–1910); Boston Braves (1913)

Career highlights and awards
- 2× NL strikeout leader (1897, 1898); NL batting champion (1905); NL RBI leader (1905); Cincinnati Reds Hall of Fame

James Bentley "Cy" Seymour (December 9, 1872 – September 20, 1919) was an American professional baseball center fielder and pitcher, who played in Major League Baseball (MLB) from 1896 to 1913 for the New York Giants (1896–1900; 1906–1910), Baltimore Orioles (1901–1902), Cincinnati Reds (1902–1906) and Boston Braves (1913). He batted and threw left-handed.

Primarily a center fielder, Seymour retired with 1,724 hits and a lifetime batting average (BA) of .303. He was a pitcher for his first five seasons, ending his MLB career with a 61–56 win–loss record and a 3.76 earned run average (ERA) in 140 games pitched (123 as a starting pitcher). Seymour is the only player apart from Babe Ruth to finish his career with at least 50 home runs (HR) and 50 pitching wins. Seymour is the Reds' career leader in batting average (.332) and holds the Reds' single-season record for batting average (.377 in 1905).

== Career ==
=== Early career ===
Seymour played semi-professional baseball in Plattsburgh, New York, receiving a monthly salary of $1,000 ($38,700 in current dollar terms). He began his professional career in minor league baseball with Springfield Ponies of the Class-A Eastern League and New York Metropolitans of the Class-A Atlantic League in 1896.

=== Major League Baseball ===
==== New York Giants (1896–1900) ====
Seymour signed with the New York Giants of the National League (NL) during the 1896 season, making his Major League Baseball (MLB) debut on April 22. A sometimes wild pitcher, The New York Times described him as having a "$10,000 arm and a $00,000 head". Seymour set an MLB record with three errors in one inning, a record later tied by Tommy John. However, he pitched to an 18–14 win–loss record in 1897, with a 3.37 earned run average (ERA), while recording 149 strikeouts, good for second in the NL.

In 1898, he won 25 games, had a 3.18 ERA, and led the NL in strikeouts with 239, while leading the team in wins and games started (43). During the season, Seymour pitched three games in two days against the Baltimore Orioles. Orioles manager John McGraw later said that Seymour deserved the title of "Iron Man" more than Joe McGinnity.

Seymour held out from the Giants for the first month of the 1899 season in a contract dispute, eventually signing for $2,000 ($77,400 in current dollar terms), a $500 raise ($19,350 in current dollar terms) over his 1898 salary. He finished second in the NL in strikeouts with 142. Seymour was briefly demoted to the minor leagues after walking 11 batters in a victory against the St. Louis Perfectos on June 7, 1900. Due to injuries and the ineffectiveness of the Giants' outfielders, the team began to play Seymour in the outfield, though they insisted that Seymour would not shift positions on a permanent basis. Seymour last pitched for the Giants that season, at which point he converted into an outfielder full-time due to injury from throwing the screwball.

==== Baltimore Orioles (1901–1902) ====
With the formation of the American League (AL) as a competitor to the NL, Seymour joined many fellow NL players who jumped to the AL. McGraw, remembering Seymour's toughness in previous seasons, signed Seymour to his team, the Baltimore Orioles, before the 1901 season. Seymour batted .303 with the Orioles that year. By 1902, the franchise began to fall into significant debt. Joe Kelley, star player for the Orioles and son-in-law of part-owner John Mahon, reported that the team owed as much as $12,000 ($446,538 in current dollar terms). Unable to afford that debt, Mahon purchased shares of the team from Kelley and player-manager McGraw, who had resigned from the team and signed with the Giants. With this, Mahon became the majority shareholder. On July 17, 1902, Mahon sold his interest in the Orioles to Andrew Freedman, principal owner of the Giants, and John T. Brush, principal owner of the Cincinnati Reds, also of the NL. That day, Freedman and Brush released Seymour, McGraw, Kelley, McGinnity, Roger Bresnahan, Jack Cronin, and Dan McGann from their Oriole contracts. Brush then signed Seymour and Kelley to the Reds, while Freedman signed McGinnity, Bresnahan, Cronin, and McGann, joining McGraw, his new player-manager, on the Giants.

==== Cincinnati Reds (1902–1906) ====
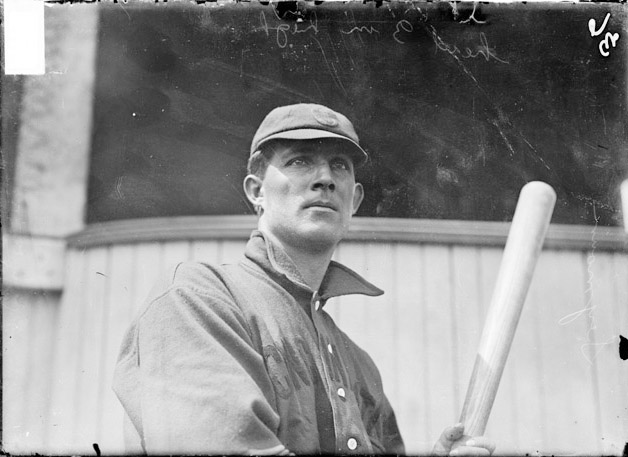
Seymour with the Cincinnati Reds in 1903

Reds owner Garry Herrmann added $100 per month ($3,721 in current dollar terms) to Seymour's $2,800 annual salary ($104,192 in current dollar terms) when he acquired him from Baltimore, and made him the team's starting center fielder. He set a record with four sacrifice bunts in one game on July 25, 1902; this mark was tied by Jake Daubert on August 15, 1914. Seymour continued to bat above .300 with the Reds in each season through 1905, when he led the NL in batting average (.377), hits (219), runs batted in (RBI) (121), doubles (40), triples (21), and slugging percentage (.559). He nearly won the Triple Crown but finished second in home runs with eight, behind Fred Odwell's nine. His .377 batting average set the single-season record for the Reds, and his 325 total bases that season were an NL record through 1919. Seymour had a .333 batting average during his tenure with the Reds, which remains a franchise record.

==== New York Giants (1906–1910) ====
The Giants purchased Seymour from the Reds on July 12, 1906, for $10,000 ($358,333 in current dollar terms), the largest monetary transaction in baseball to date. Seymour attempted to hold out from the Giants in order to obtain a portion of this transfer fee, claiming that Herrmann had promised him this money if the sale was completed. McGraw convinced Seymour not to hold out, which could have set a precedent for players obtaining money in player transactions. He batted .286 in 1906 for the Reds and Giants, finishing eighth in the NL.

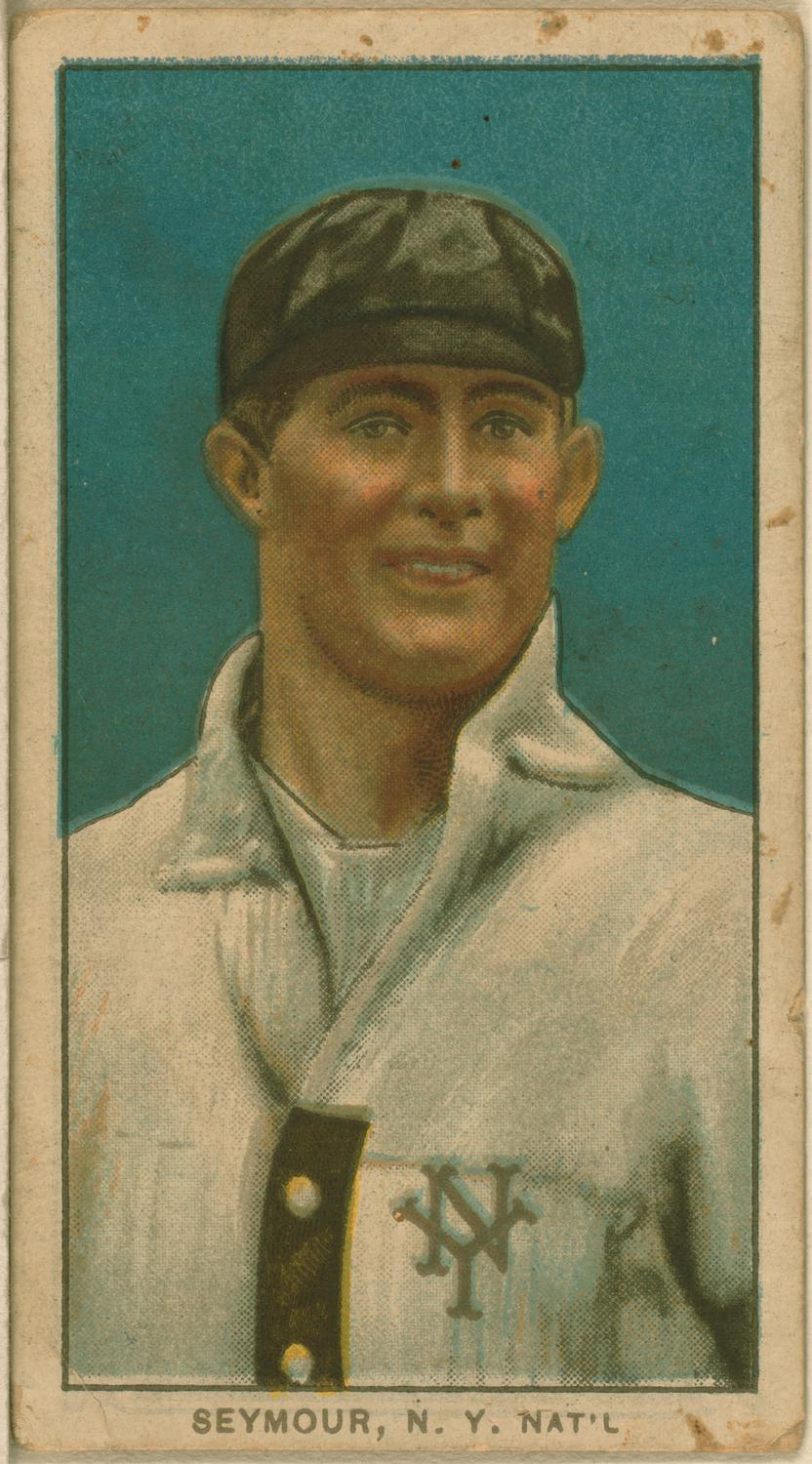
Cy Seymour's baseball card

Seymour finished fifth in the NL in batting average (.294) for the 1907 season. However, an ankle injury prematurely ended his season. His batting average declined to .267 for the 1908 season. That year, he participated in one of baseball's most infamous plays, known as Merkle's Boner, in which the Giants lost the pennant to the Chicago Cubs. In the replayed game between the Giants and Cubs, Giants pitcher Christy Mathewson reportedly waved Seymour to move further back in the outfield; Seymour refused, only to see the ball hit over his head, allowing the Cubs to score three runs on their way to the win. Mathewson later denied waving Seymour back, saying Seymour "knew the Chicago batters as well as [he] did and how to play them."

As there were no full-time base coaches at the time, players took turns in the role. While coaching at third base, Seymour tackled teammate Moose McCormick as he rounded third base and headed for home plate, in an attempt to keep McCormick at third. McCormick overpowered Seymour and scored. When McGraw asked why, Seymour made an excuse about having the sun in his eyes. This led McGraw, now realizing the need for a full-time coach, to hire Arlie Latham for the role, the first full-time coach in MLB. Seymour got into an altercation with Latham in March 1909 at the team's hotel, prompting McGraw to seek a buyer for Seymour. Seymour apologized to McGraw, who responded by suspending Seymour for eight weeks. However, Seymour injured his right leg in his first game back from the suspension. This injury limited his effectiveness for the rest of his career. As a part-time player that season, he batted .311, best among NL reserves. He again played a reserve role for the Giants in 1910, batting .265 in 79 games.

=== Later career ===
The minor league Baltimore Orioles of the Class-A Eastern League purchased Seymour from the Giants on August 24, 1910. After playing for the Orioles in the 1911 season, they sold him to the Newark Indians of the Class-AA International League, where he played during the 1912 season. Seymour became property of the Los Angeles Angels of the Class-A Pacific Coast League after the 1912 season, but he secured his release from the Angels without playing a game for them,

Seymour subsequently signed as a free agent with the Boston Braves on February 25, 1913. After playing sparingly for the Braves during the 1913 season, the Braves released him on July 19, 1913, as they were carrying 26 players on their roster, though league rules permitted a maximum roster of 25. Seymour played for the Buffalo Bisons of the Class-A International League after being released by the Braves. He returned to professional baseball in 1918, playing in 13 games for the Newark Bears of the International League.

== After baseball ==
Seymour was declared physically unfit for service in World War I. However, he worked in wartime jobs in the Speedway shipyards and Bush terminal. While working in the shipyards, he contracted tuberculosis, and died at his home on September 20, 1919. He was interred in Albany Rural Cemetery.

== Career perspective ==
Few players enjoyed as much success as Seymour as both a pitcher and hitter; only Babe Ruth recorded more combined pitching victories and hits. As a pitcher, Seymour threw a fastball, a curveball, and a screwball. Orioles catcher Wilbert Robinson said that he had never caught a pitcher as wild as Seymour, as opposing batters did "not know whether their head or feet were in most danger."

"I look upon Seymour as the greatest straight ball player of the age, by that I mean he is absolutely all right if you let him play the game his own way. But if you try to mix up any science on him you are likely to injure his effectiveness."

— Ned Hanlon

In his 16-year MLB career, Seymour hit 52 home runs with 799 RBI, 1,723 hits, 222 stolen bases, and a .303 batting average. He also won 61 games as a pitcher. Seymour was posthumously inducted in the Cincinnati Reds Hall of Fame in 1998.

The New York World listed Seymour as one of the best players in baseball, along with Mathewson, Ed Walsh, Honus Wagner, Nap Lajoie, and Roger Bresnahan. Elmer Flick insisted that Seymour was the toughest pitcher he batted against, saying he "was practically unhittable" and that Seymour "had a wonderful control of his curve ball."

According to a formula for evaluating baseball players developed by Bill James, Seymour ranks above Hall of Famers Lloyd Waner, Jimmy Collins, and Joe Tinker.

== See also ==
- List of Major League Baseball annual runs batted in leaders
- List of Major League Baseball batting champions
- List of Major League Baseball annual strikeout leaders
- List of Major League Baseball annual doubles leaders
- List of Major League Baseball annual triples leaders
- List of Major League Baseball career stolen bases leaders
