= Jack Himes =

American baseball player (1878–1949)

- Outfielder
- Born: September 22, 1878; Bryan, Ohio, U.S.
- Died: December 16, 1949 (aged 71); Joliet, Illinois, U.S.
- Batted: Left Threw: Right

MLB debut
- September 18, 1905, for the St. Louis Cardinals

Last MLB appearance
- May 30, 1906, for the St. Louis Cardinals

MLB statistics
- Batting average: .245
- Home runs: 0
- Runs batted in: 14
- Stats at Baseball Reference

Teams
- St. Louis Cardinals (1905–1906)

John Herby Himes (September 22, 1878 – December 16, 1949) was an American Major League Baseball outfielder who played for the St. Louis Cardinals in 1905 and 1906.
