= Buttons Briggs =

American baseball player (1875–1911)

- Pitcher
- Born: July 8, 1875; Poughkeepsie, New York, U.S.
- Died: February 11, 1911 (aged 35); Cleveland, Ohio, U.S.
- Batted: Right Threw: Right

MLB debut
- April 23, 1896, for the Chicago Colts

Last MLB appearance
- September 23, 1905, for the Chicago Cubs

MLB statistics
- Win–loss record: 44–47
- earned run average: 3.41
- Strikeouts: 338
- Stats at Baseball Reference

Teams
- Chicago Colts/Orphans/Cubs (1896–1898, 1904–1905)

Herbert Theodore "Buttons" Briggs (July 8, 1875 – February 18, 1911) was an American Major League Baseball pitcher who played a total of five seasons.

== Career ==
Born in Poughkeepsie, New York, Briggs played his entire major league career for the Chicago National League franchise. He began his career with the Chicago Colts in 1896, and played three seasons through the 1898 season when the team was known as the Orphans. His second stretch with the club was from 1904 to 1905 when they were known as the Cubs. He finished his career with 44 wins and 47 losses and a 3.41 ERA.

== Later life ==
Around 1910, Briggs contracted pneumonia but was able to return to work as a decorator in Cleveland. In January 1911, a newspaper account described him as "down and out with lung trouble." He died of tuberculosis at his Cleveland home in June 1911. His friends in Cleveland had scheduled a benefit for him, which was held a few days after he died. He is interred at the Calvary Cemetery there.
