= Jim Wallace (baseball) =

American baseball player (1881–1953)

- Outfielder
- Born: November 14, 1881; Boston, Massachusetts, U.S.
- Died: May 16, 1953 (aged 71); Revere, Massachusetts, U.S.
- Batted: Switch Threw: Right

MLB debut
- August 24, 1905, for the Pittsburgh Pirates

Last MLB appearance
- August 29, 1905, for the Pittsburgh Pirates

MLB statistics
- Batting average: .207
- Home runs: 0
- Runs batted in: 3
- Stats at Baseball Reference

Teams
- Pittsburgh Pirates (1905)

James Leo Wallace (November 14, 1881 - May 16, 1953) was an American professional baseball player. He played seven games in Major League Baseball for the Pittsburgh Pirates in 1905, all as a right fielder. He batted .207 in his brief major league career, going 6-for-29 with 3 RBI.

== Sources ==
- Career statistics from Baseball Reference · Baseball Reference (Minors) · Retrosheet · Baseball Almanac
