= Buck Washer =

American baseball player (1882–1955)

- Pitcher
- Born: October 11, 1882; Akron, Ohio, U.S.
- Died: December 8, 1955 (aged 73); Akron, Ohio, U.S.
- Batted: Right Threw: Right

MLB debut
- April 25, 1905, for the Philadelphia Phillies

Last MLB appearance
- April 25, 1905, for the Philadelphia Phillies

MLB statistics
- Games: 1
- Win–loss record: 0–0
- ERA: 6.00
- Stats at Baseball Reference

Teams
- Philadelphia Phillies (1905)

William "Buck" Washer (October 11, 1882 – December 8, 1955) was an American professional baseball pitcher. Washer played for the Philadelphia Phillies in the 1905 season. In one career game, he had a 0–0 record, giving up two runs, four hits, and also gave up five walks. He batted and threw right-handed.

Washer attended West Virginia University, where he played college baseball for the Mountaineers in 1902.

Washer was born and died in Akron, Ohio.
