= Sandy McDougal =

American baseball player (1874–1910)

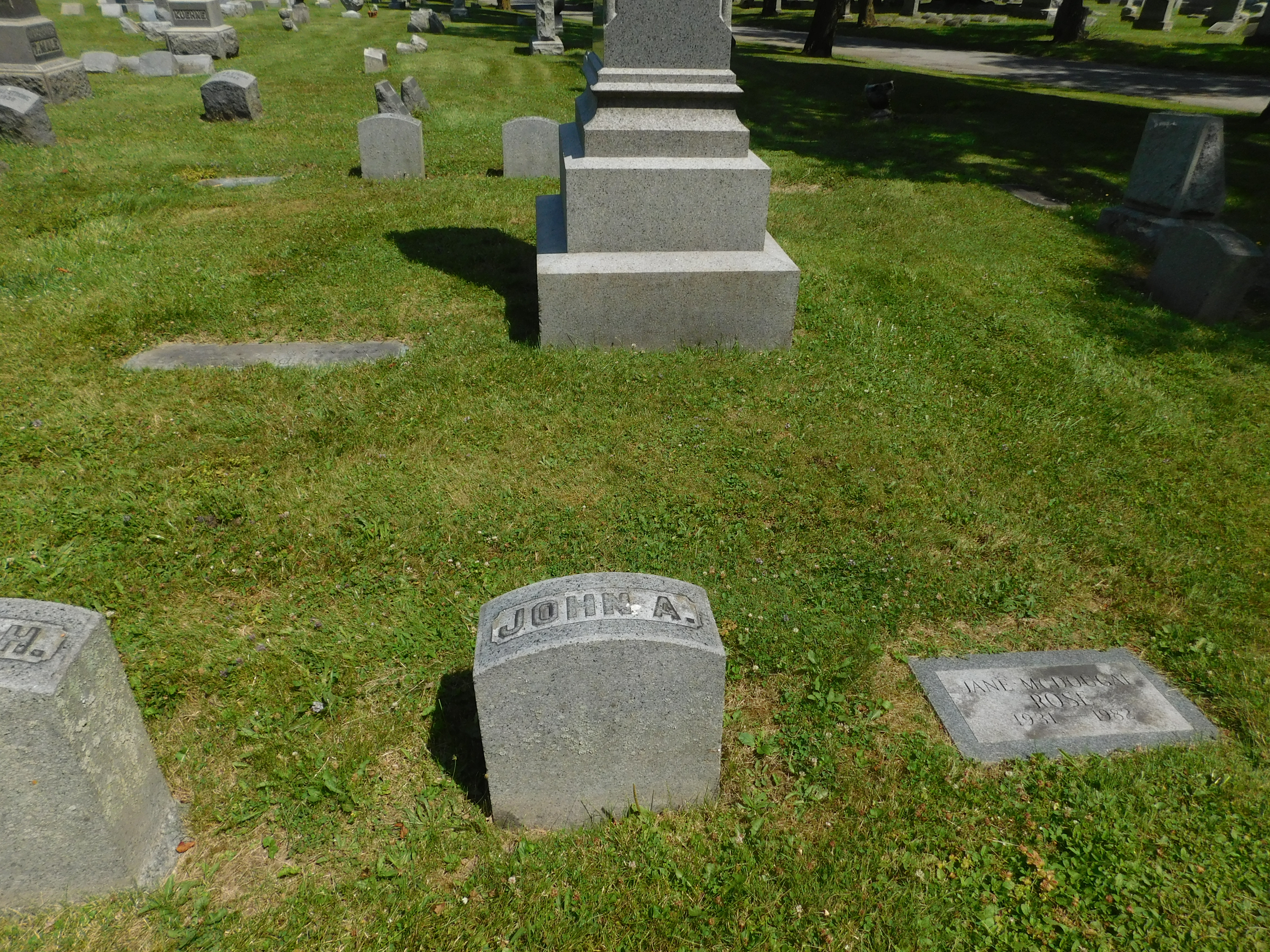
- McDougal's grave at Forest Lawn Cemetery in Buffalo, New York
- Pitcher
- Born: May 21, 1874; Buffalo, New York, U.S.
- Died: October 2, 1910 (aged 36); Buffalo, New York, U.S.
- Batted: Right Threw: Right

MLB debut
- June 12, 1895, for the Brooklyn Grooms

Last MLB appearance
- October 8, 1905, for the St. Louis Cardinals

MLB statistics
- Win–loss record: 1-4
- Earned run average: 3.97
- Strikeouts: 12
- Stats at Baseball Reference

Teams
- Brooklyn Grooms (1895); St. Louis Cardinals (1905)

John Auchanbolt McDougal (May 21, 1874 – October 2, 1910) was a 19th-century American Major League Baseball pitcher. He pitched in one game for the Brooklyn Grooms in the 1895 season and five games for the St. Louis Cardinals during the 1905 season.
