= Gerry Shea =

American baseball player (1881–1964)

- Catcher
- Born: October 26, 1881; Omaha, Nebraska
- Died: May 3, 1964 (aged 82); Berkeley, Missouri
- Batted: Unknown Threw: Right

MLB debut
- October 1, 1905, for the St. Louis Cardinals

Last MLB appearance
- October 3, 1905, for the St. Louis Cardinals

MLB statistics
- Games: 2
- At bats: 6
- Hits: 2
- Stats at Baseball Reference

Teams
- St. Louis Cardinals (1910)

Gerald Joseph "Gerry" Shea (October 26, 1881 – May 3, 1964) was a Major League Baseball catcher. Shea played for the St. Louis Cardinals in 1905. In 2 career games, he had two hits in six at-bats. It is unknown which hand he batted with and he threw right-handed. He was apparently the first major league player to graduate from Creighton University.

Shea was born in Omaha, Nebraska, and died in Berkeley, Missouri.
