= Billy Campbell (baseball) =

American baseball player (1873–1957)

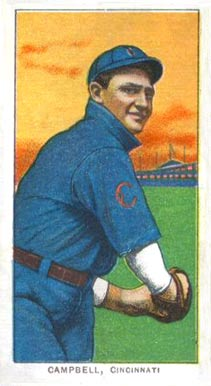
- Pitcher
- Born: November 5, 1873; Pittsburgh, Pennsylvania, U.S.
- Died: October 6, 1957 (aged 83); Cincinnati, Ohio, U.S.
- Batted: Left Threw: Left

MLB debut
- April 17, 1905, for the St. Louis Cardinals

Last MLB appearance
- August 23, 1909, for the Cincinnati Reds

MLB statistics
- Win–loss record: 23–25
- Earned run average: 2.80
- Strikeouts: 116
- Stats at Baseball Reference

Teams
- St. Louis Cardinals (1905); Cincinnati Reds (1907–1909)

William James Campbell (November 5, 1873 – October 6, 1957) was an American professional baseball player. He was a left-handed pitcher over parts of four seasons (1905, 1907–09) with the St. Louis Cardinals and Cincinnati Reds. For his career, he compiled a 23–25 record, with a 2.80 earned run average, and 116 strikeouts in 407 2/3 innings pitched.

He was born in Pittsburgh, Pennsylvania and later died in Cincinnati, Ohio at the age of 83.
