= 1905 Pittsburgh Pirates season =

1905 Pittsburgh Pirates
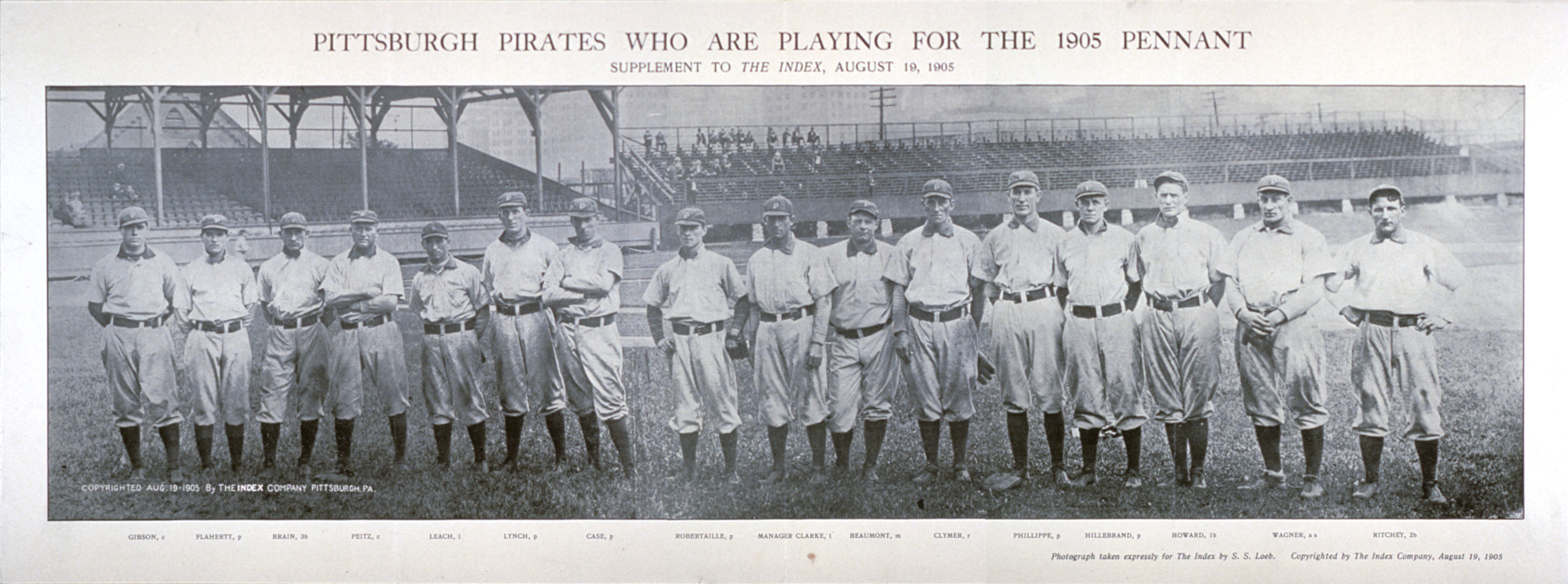
- Team photo, August 1905
- League: National League
- Ballpark: Exposition Park
- City: Allegheny, Pennsylvania
- Owners: Barney Dreyfuss
- Managers: Fred Clarke

The 1905 Pittsburgh (Note: In the early 20th century and earlier, the name of Pittsburgh was spelled with and without the final 'h'.) Pirates season was the 24th season of the Pittsburgh Pirates franchise. The Pirates finished second in the National League with a record of 96–57.

== Regular season ==
=== Season standings ===
National League
Team	W	L	Pct.	GB	Home	Road
New York Giants	105	48	.686	—	54‍–‍21	51‍–‍27
Pittsburgh Pirates	96	57	.627	9	49‍–‍28	47‍–‍29
Chicago Cubs	92	61	.601	13	54‍–‍25	38‍–‍36
Philadelphia Phillies	83	69	.546	21½	39‍–‍36	44‍–‍33
Cincinnati Reds	79	74	.516	26	50‍–‍28	29‍–‍46
St. Louis Cardinals	58	96	.377	47½	32‍–‍45	26‍–‍51
Boston Beaneaters	51	103	.331	54½	29‍–‍46	22‍–‍57
Brooklyn Superbas	48	104	.316	56½	29‍–‍47	19‍–‍57

=== Record vs. opponents ===
1905 National League record Sources:
Team	BSN	BRO	CHC	CIN	NYG	PHI	PIT	STL
Boston	—	11–11–1	7–15	8–14	3–19	5–17–1	9–13	8–14
Brooklyn	11–11–1	—	6–16	4–18	7–15	3–18–1	7–14–1	10–12
Chicago	15–7	16–6	—	12–10	10–12	12–9–1	10–12–1	17–5
Cincinnati	14–8	18–4	10–12	—	5–16–2	13–9	9–13	10–12
New York	19–3	15–7	12–10	16–5–2	—	14–8	12–10	17–5
Philadelphia	17–5–1	18–3–1	9–12–1	9–13	8–14	—	6–16	16–6
Pittsburgh	13–9	14–7–1	12–10–1	13–9	10–12	16–6	—	18–4
St. Louis	14–8	12–10	5–17	12–10	5–17	6–16	4–18	—

=== Roster ===
1905 Pittsburgh Pirates
Roster
Pitchers: Charlie Case; Patsy Flaherty; Ed Kinsella; Sam Leever; Lefty Leifield; Mike Lynch; Frank Moore; Deacon Phillippe; Chick Robitaille	Catchers: Fred Carisch; George Gibson; Heinie Peitz; Harry Smith; Infielders: Dave Brain; Bill Clancy; Homer Hillebrand; Del Howard; Otto Knabe; George McBride; Claude Ritchey; Honus Wagner	Outfielders: Ginger Beaumont; Fred Clarke; Otis Clymer; Steamer Flanagan; Bob Ganley; Tommy Leach; Jim Wallace	Manager: Fred Clarke

== Player stats ==
=== Batting ===
==== Starters by position ====
Note: Pos = Position; G = Games played; AB = At bats; H = Hits; Avg. = Batting average; HR = Home runs; RBI = Runs batted in

Pos	Player	G	AB	H	Avg.	HR	RBI
C	Heinie Peitz	88	278	62	.223	0	27
1B	Del Howard	123	435	127	.292	2	63
2B	Claude Ritchey	153	533	136	.255	0	52
SS	Honus Wagner	147	548	199	.363	6	101
3B	Dave Brain	85	307	79	.257	3	46
OF	Ginger Beaumont	103	384	126	.328	3	40
OF	Fred Clarke	141	525	157	.299	2	51
OF	Otis Clymer	96	365	108	.296	0	23

==== Other batters ====
Note: G = Games played; AB = At bats; H = Hits; Avg. = Batting average; HR = Home runs; RBI = Runs batted in

Player	G	AB	H	Avg.	HR	RBI
Tommy Leach	131	499	128	.257	2	53
Bill Clancy	56	227	52	.229	2	34
George Gibson	46	135	24	.178	2	14
Bob Ganley	32	127	40	.315	0	7
Homer Hillebrand	39	110	26	.236	0	7
Fred Carisch	32	107	22	.206	0	8
George McBride	27	87	19	.218	0	7
Jim Wallace	7	29	6	.207	0	3
Steamer Flanagan	7	25	7	.280	0	3
Otto Knabe	3	10	3	.300	0	2
Harry Smith	1	3	0	.000	0	1

=== Pitching ===
==== Starting pitchers ====
Note: G = Games pitched; IP = Innings pitched; W = Wins; L = Losses; ERA = Earned run average; SO = Strikeouts

Player	G	IP	W	L	ERA	SO
Deacon Phillippe	38	279.0	20	13	2.19	133
Sam Leever	33	229.2	20	5	2.70	81
Charlie Case	31	217.0	11	11	2.57	57
Patsy Flaherty	27	187.2	10	10	3.50	44
Chick Robitaille	17	120.1	8	5	2.92	32
Lefty Leifield	8	56.0	5	2	2.89	10

==== Other pitchers ====
Note: G = Games pitched; IP = Innings pitched; W = Wins; L = Losses; ERA = Earned run average; SO = Strikeouts

Player	G	IP	W	L	ERA	SO
Mike Lynch	33	206.1	17	8	3.79	106
Homer Hillebrand	10	60.2	5	2	2.82	37
Ed Kinsella	3	17.0	0	1	2.65	11

==== Relief pitchers ====
Note: G = Games pitched; W = Wins; L = Losses; SV = Saves; ERA = Earned run average; SO = Strikeouts

Player	G	W	L	SV	ERA	SO
Del Howard	1	0	0	0	0.00	0
Frank Moore	1	0	0	0	0.00	1
