= King Brady =

American baseball player (1881–1947)

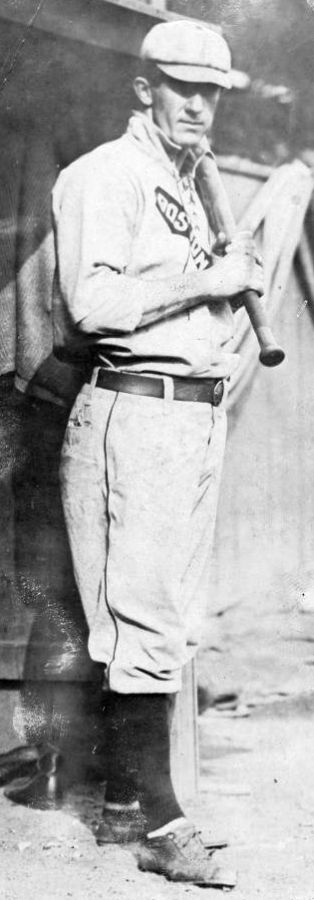
- Pitcher
- Born: May 28, 1881; Elmer, New Jersey
- Died: August 21, 1947 (aged 66); Albany, New York
- Batted: Right Threw: Right

MLB debut
- September 21, 1905, for the Philadelphia Phillies

Last MLB appearance
- April 13, 1912, for the Boston Braves

MLB statistics
- Win–loss record: 3–2
- Earned run average: 3.08
- Strikeouts: 20
- Stats at Baseball Reference

Teams
- Philadelphia Phillies (1905); Pittsburgh Pirates (1906–1907); Boston Red Sox (1908); Boston Braves (1912)

James Ward Brady (May 28, 1881 – August 21, 1947) was a starting pitcher in Major League Baseball who played between 1905 and 1912. Brady batted and threw right-handed.

In 1881, King Brady was born in Elmer, New Jersey. A modest pitcher most of his career, Brady was 24 years old when he reached the majors in 1905 with the Philadelphia Phillies, spending one year with them before moving to the Pittsburgh Pirates (1906–1907), Boston Red Sox (1908) and Boston Braves (1912). His most productive season came in 1906 with Pittsburgh, when he finished 1-1 and compiled career-highs in ERA (2.35), strikeouts (14) and innings pitched (23.0). On October 5, 1908, with the Red Sox, he made his only American League appearance a good one, pitching an eight-hit, 4–0 shutout over the New York Highlanders.
