= Doc Reisling =

American baseball player (1874-1955)

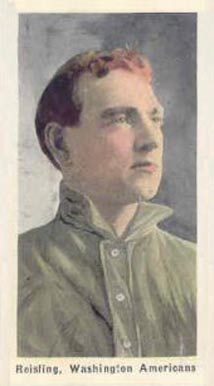
- Pitcher
- Born: July 25, 1874; Martins Ferry, Ohio, U.S.
- Died: March 4, 1955 (aged 80); Tulsa, Oklahoma, U.S.
- Batted: Right Threw: Right

MLB debut
- September 10, 1904, for the Brooklyn Superbas

Last MLB appearance
- October 5, 1910, for the Washington Senators

MLB statistics
- Win–loss record: 15–19
- Earned run average: 2.45
- Strikeouts: 100
- Stats at Baseball Reference

Teams
- Brooklyn Superbas (1904–1905); Washington Senators (1909–1910)

Frank Carl Reisling (July 25, 1874 in Martins Ferry, Ohio – March 4, 1955 in Tulsa, Oklahoma) was an American pitcher in Major League Baseball. He pitched from 1904–1910 with the Brooklyn Superbas and Washington Senators.
