= Chick Robitaille =

American baseball player (1879–1947)

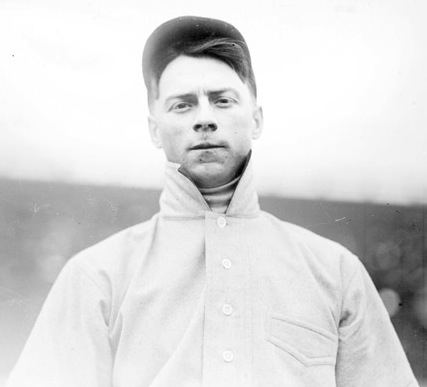
- Pitcher
- Born: March 2, 1879; Whitehall, New York, U.S.
- Died: July 30, 1947 (aged 68); Waterford, New York, U.S.
- Batted: Right Threw: Right

MLB debut
- September 2, 1904, for the Pittsburgh Pirates

Last MLB appearance
- August 29, 1905, for the Pittsburgh Pirates

MLB statistics
- Win–loss record: 12–8
- Earned run average: 2.56
- Strikeouts: 66
- Stats at Baseball Reference

Teams
- Pittsburgh Pirates (1904–1905)

Joseph Anthony Robitaille (March 2, 1879 – July 30, 1947) was an American Major League Baseball pitcher who played in 1904 and 1905 with the Pittsburgh Pirates. He batted and threw right-handed.

He was born in Whitehall, New York and died in Waterford, New York.
