= 1905 Boston Beaneaters season =

1905 Boston Beaneaters
- League: National League
- Ballpark: South End Grounds
- City: Boston, Massachusetts
- Record: 51–103 (.331)
- League place: 7th
- Owners: Arthur Soden
- Managers: Fred Tenney

The 1905 Boston Beaneaters season was the 35th season of the franchise. The Beaneaters finished seventh in the National League with a record of 51 wins and 103 losses.

== Regular season ==
=== Season standings ===
National League
Team	W	L	Pct.	GB	Home	Road
New York Giants	105	48	.686	—	54‍–‍21	51‍–‍27
Pittsburgh Pirates	96	57	.627	9	49‍–‍28	47‍–‍29
Chicago Cubs	92	61	.601	13	54‍–‍25	38‍–‍36
Philadelphia Phillies	83	69	.546	21½	39‍–‍36	44‍–‍33
Cincinnati Reds	79	74	.516	26	50‍–‍28	29‍–‍46
St. Louis Cardinals	58	96	.377	47½	32‍–‍45	26‍–‍51
Boston Beaneaters	51	103	.331	54½	29‍–‍46	22‍–‍57
Brooklyn Superbas	48	104	.316	56½	29‍–‍47	19‍–‍57

=== Record vs. opponents ===
1905 National League record Sources:
Team	BSN	BRO	CHC	CIN	NYG	PHI	PIT	STL
Boston	—	11–11–1	7–15	8–14	3–19	5–17–1	9–13	8–14
Brooklyn	11–11–1	—	6–16	4–18	7–15	3–18–1	7–14–1	10–12
Chicago	15–7	16–6	—	12–10	10–12	12–9–1	10–12–1	17–5
Cincinnati	14–8	18–4	10–12	—	5–16–2	13–9	9–13	10–12
New York	19–3	15–7	12–10	16–5–2	—	14–8	12–10	17–5
Philadelphia	17–5–1	18–3–1	9–12–1	9–13	8–14	—	6–16	16–6
Pittsburgh	13–9	14–7–1	12–10–1	13–9	10–12	16–6	—	18–4
St. Louis	14–8	12–10	5–17	12–10	5–17	6–16	4–18	—

=== Roster ===
1905 Boston Beaneaters
Roster
Pitchers: Chick Fraser; Dick Harley; Frank Hershey; Jake Volz; Kaiser Wilhelm; Vic Willis; Irv Young	Catchers: Bill McCarthy; Pat Moran; Tom Needham; Gabby Street; Infielders: Ed Abbaticchio; Bill Lauterborn; Dave Murphy; Fred Raymer; Allie Strobel; Fred Tenney; Harry Wolverton	Outfielders: George Barclay; Rip Cannell; Jim Delahanty; Cozy Dolan; Bud Sharpe	Manager: Fred Tenney

== Player stats ==
=== Batting ===
==== Starters by position ====
Note: Pos = Position; G = Games played; AB = At bats; H = Hits; Avg. = Batting average; HR = Home runs; RBI = Runs batted in

Pos	Player	G	AB	H	Avg.	HR	RBI
C	Pat Moran	85	267	64	.240	2	22
1B	Fred Tenney	149	549	158	.288	0	28
2B	Fred Raymer	137	498	105	.211	0	31
SS	Ed Abbaticchio	153	610	170	.279	3	41
3B	Harry Wolverton	122	463	104	.225	2	55
OF	Cozy Dolan	112	433	119	.275	3	48
OF	Jim Delahanty	125	461	119	.258	5	55
OF	Rip Cannell	154	567	140	.247	0	36

==== Other batters ====
Note: G = Games played; AB = At bats; H = Hits; Avg. = Batting average; HR = Home runs; RBI = Runs batted in

Player	G	AB	H	Avg.	HR	RBI
Tom Needham	83	271	59	.218	2	17
Bill Lauterborn	67	200	37	.185	0	9
Bud Sharpe	46	170	31	.182	0	11
George Barclay	29	108	19	.176	0	7
Allie Strobel	5	19	2	.105	0	2
Gabby Street	3	12	2	.167	0	0
Dave Murphy	3	11	2	.182	0	1
Bill McCarthy	1	3	0	.000	0	0

=== Pitching ===
==== Starting pitchers ====
Note: G = Games pitched; IP = Innings pitched; W = Wins; L = Losses; ERA = Earned run average; SO = Strikeouts

Player	G	IP	W	L	ERA	SO
Irv Young	43	378.0	20	21	2.90	156
Vic Willis	41	342.0	12	29	3.21	149
Chick Fraser	39	334.1	14	21	3.28	130
Kaiser Wilhelm	34	242.1	3	23	4.53	76
Frank Hershey	1	4.0	0	1	6.75	1
Jim Delahanty	1	2.0	0	0	4.50	0

==== Other pitchers ====
Note: G = Games pitched; IP = Innings pitched; W = Wins; L = Losses; ERA = Earned run average; SO = Strikeouts

Player	G	IP	W	L	ERA	SO
Dick Harley	9	65.2	2	5	4.66	19
Jake Volz	3	8.2	0	2	10.38	1

==== Relief pitchers ====
Note: G = Games pitched; W = Wins; L = Losses; SV = Saves; ERA = Earned run average; SO = Strikeouts

Player	G	W	L	SV	ERA	SO
Cozy Dolan	2	0	1	0	9.00	1
Fred Tenney	1	0	0	0	4.50	0
