= Charlie Malay =

American baseball player (1879–1949)

- Second baseman
- Born: June 13, 1879; Brooklyn, New York, U.S.
- Died: September 18, 1949 (aged 70); Brooklyn, New York, U.S.
- Batted: Switch Threw: Right

MLB debut
- April 24, 1905, for the Brooklyn Superbas

Last MLB appearance
- October 7, 1905, for the Brooklyn Superbas

MLB statistics
- Batting average: .252
- Home runs: 1
- Runs batted in: 31
- Stats at Baseball Reference

Teams
- Brooklyn Superbas (1905)

Charles Francis Malay (June 13, 1879 – September 18, 1949) was an American professional baseball player who played second base for the 1905 Brooklyn Superbas. His son, Joe Malay, also played professional baseball.
