= Shad Barry =

American baseball player (1878–1936)

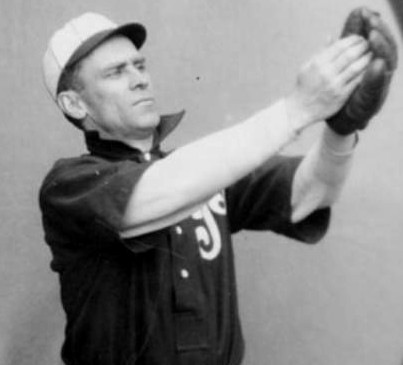
- Utility player
- Born: October 27, 1878; Newburgh, New York, U.S.
- Died: November 27, 1936 (aged 58); Los Angeles, California, U.S.
- Batted: Right Threw: Right

MLB debut
- May 30, 1899, for the Washington Senators

Last MLB appearance
- October 7, 1908, for the New York Giants

MLB statistics
- Batting average: .267
- Home runs: 10
- Runs batted in: 391
- Stats at Baseball Reference

Teams
- Washington Senators (1899); Boston Beaneaters (1900–1901); Philadelphia Phillies (1901–1904); Chicago Cubs (1904–1905); Cincinnati Reds (1905–1906); St. Louis Cardinals (1906–1908); New York Giants (1908)

John Charles "Shad" Barry (October 27, 1878 – November 27, 1936), known also as "Jack" Barry, was an American professional baseball player who spent ten seasons, from 1899 to 1909, in Major League Baseball. Barry was a utility player, having played every position with the exception of catcher and pitcher during his career.

== Early life ==
Barry was born in Newburgh, New York. Barry attended Niagara University.

== Career ==
Barry began his major league career with the Washington Senators in 1899. On February 11, 1900, Washington sold him (along with Bill Dineen and Buck Freeman) to the Boston Beaneaters for $7500. On a Boston team that included several .300 hitters, Barry was relegated to a utility player role; he played in 81 games in 1900, leading the league in pinch-hitting appearances.

After two seasons, Boston released Barry on May 11, 1901, and he was signed by the Philadelphia Phillies five days later. He remained with Philadelphia until he was traded to the Chicago Cubs for Frank Corridon on July 20, 1904. Chicago later sold him to the Cincinnati Reds on January 20, 1905. Barry had been hitting .212 in 27 games for Chicago, but he hit .324 in 125 games for Cincinnati that year. On July 25, 1906, Barry was traded to the St. Louis Cardinals for Homer Smoot. He had hit .287 for Cincinnati in 73 games, but he hit only .249 in 62 games with the Cardinals. The Cardinals sold Barry to the New York Giants on August 3, 1908.

In 1909, the Giants sold Barry to the minor league Milwaukee Brewers of the American Association. He played for Milwaukee until 1910 when he was granted a release from his contract. He contacted Walt McCredie, manager of the Portland Beavers in the Pacific Coast League (PCL), and secured a contract for the 1911 season. Barry started wearing eye glasses during the 1911 season, telling The Oregonian, "Certainly I think spectacles will help a batsman [...] This statement may sound far-fetched now, but remember that the catching mitt, the mask, the breast and shin protectors are only recent products." During the final weeks of the 1911 PCL pennant race, The Oregonian featured columns written by Barry. Barry's net worth in 1911 was estimated at $50,000 (equivalent to $1,687,321 in 2024) by Oregonian sports editor Roscoe Fawcett.

In 1100 games over 10 seasons, Barry posted a .267 batting average (1073-for-4014) with 516 runs, 128 doubles, 47 triples, 10 home runs, 391 RBI, 140 stolen bases and 279 bases on balls.

Barry was offered a player-manager role with the Northwestern League Seattle Giants in 1912. Beavers manager Walt McCredie granted Barry his release to sign with the Giants. His tenure with Seattle was tumultuous as he feuded with the team owner Dan Dugdale. According to Barry, his attempts to strengthen the roster with new players was thwarted by Dugdale, who refused to allocate money for the contracts. Barry also accused Dugdale of overstepping his role by making transactions without Barry's knowledge. He resigned his position as manager in May 1912 following an argument with Dugdale in the lobby of the Ridpath Hotel in Spokane, Washington. Dugdale claimed the disagreements stemmed from Barry's lack of leadership. Among Barry's accomplishments at the helm of the Giants was signing "Seattle" Bill James out of Saint Mary's College of California. James was sold to the Boston Braves in 1913 and led the National League in winning percentage in 1914.

The La Grande Pippins of the Western Tri-State League hired Barry as manager for the remainder of the 1912 season for a salary of $300 (equivalent to $9,775 in 2024) per month.

Barry was fond of regaling his teammates with stories. During the off-seasons, Barry was a freelance writer who submitted his works to various periodicals. He used his baseball experience to contribute to World War I, coordinating baseball programs for the American Expeditionary Forces.

== Death ==
After his baseball career, Barry provided security for a bank. He developed prostate cancer and died from it at Verdugo Hills Sanitarium in Los Angeles. He was interred at the Calvary Cemetery in Los Angeles.
