= 1905 in baseball =

The following are the baseball events of the year 1905 throughout the world.

== Champions ==
- World Series: New York Giants over Philadelphia Athletics (4–1)

== Statistical leaders ==
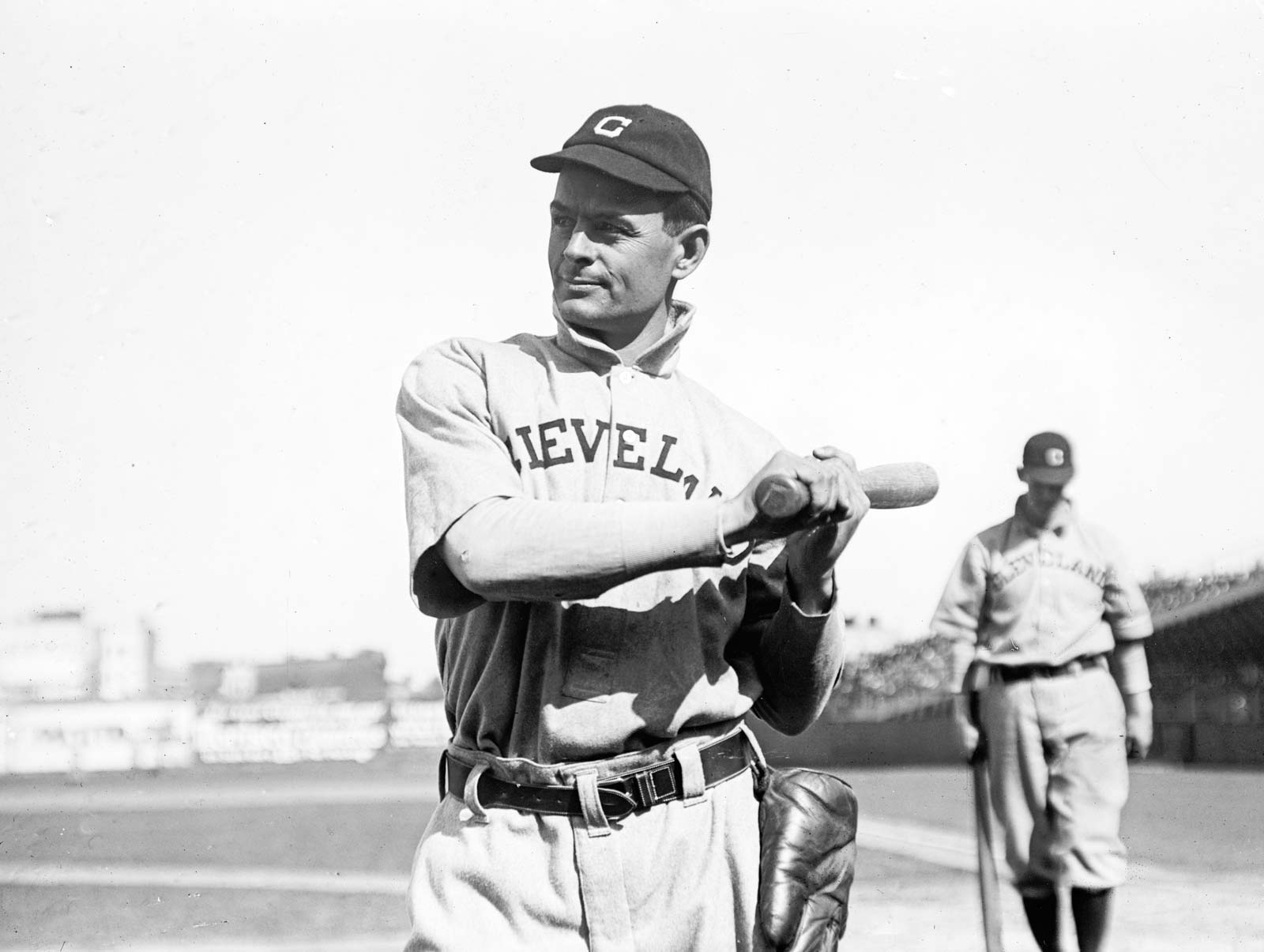
Elmer Flick

	American League		National League	
Stat	Player	Total	Player	Total
AVG	Elmer Flick (CLE)	.308	Cy Seymour (CIN)	.377
HR	Harry Davis (PHA)	8	Fred Odwell (CIN)	9
RBI	Harry Davis (PHA)	83	Cy Seymour (CIN)	121
W	Rube Waddell^{1} (PHA)	27	Christy Mathewson^{2} (NYG)	31
ERA	Rube Waddell^{1} (PHA)	1.48	Christy Mathewson^{2} (NYG)	1.28
K	Rube Waddell^{1} (PHA)	287	Christy Mathewson^{2} (NYG)	206

^{1} American League Triple Crown pitching winner
^{2} National League Triple Crown pitching winner

== Major league baseball final standings ==
=== American League final standings ===
American League
Team	W	L	Pct.	GB	Home	Road
Philadelphia Athletics	92	56	.622	—	51‍–‍22	41‍–‍34
Chicago White Sox	92	60	.605	2	50‍–‍29	42‍–‍31
Detroit Tigers	79	74	.516	15½	45‍–‍30	34‍–‍44
Boston Americans	78	74	.513	16	44‍–‍32	34‍–‍42
Cleveland Naps	76	78	.494	19	41‍–‍36	35‍–‍42
New York Highlanders	71	78	.477	21½	40‍–‍35	31‍–‍43
Washington Senators	64	87	.424	29½	33‍–‍42	31‍–‍45
St. Louis Browns	54	99	.353	40½	34‍–‍42	20‍–‍57

Locations of teams for the 1904–1907 American League seasons
American League

=== National League final standings ===
National League
Team	W	L	Pct.	GB	Home	Road
New York Giants	105	48	.686	—	54‍–‍21	51‍–‍27
Pittsburgh Pirates	96	57	.627	9	49‍–‍28	47‍–‍29
Chicago Cubs	92	61	.601	13	54‍–‍25	38‍–‍36
Philadelphia Phillies	83	69	.546	21½	39‍–‍36	44‍–‍33
Cincinnati Reds	79	74	.516	26	50‍–‍28	29‍–‍46
St. Louis Cardinals	58	96	.377	47½	32‍–‍45	26‍–‍51
Boston Beaneaters	51	103	.331	54½	29‍–‍46	22‍–‍57
Brooklyn Superbas	48	104	.316	56½	29‍–‍47	19‍–‍57

Locations of teams for the 1903–1906 National League seasons
National League

== Events ==
- April 26 – Chicago Cubs outfielder Jack McCarthy ties a major league record by starting three double plays in one game from the outfield, and becoming the first fielder to throw all base runners out at home plate, against the Pittsburgh Pirates.
- June 5 – Catcher Gabby Street is loaned to the Boston Beaneaters by the Cincinnati Reds. He is returned to the Reds on the 15th of June.
- June 13 – Christy Mathewson of the New York Giants tosses his second career no-hitter in a 1–0 victory against the Chicago Cubs.
- June 29 – Archibald "Moonlight" Graham made his major league debut with the New York Giants during a game against the host Brooklyn Superbas at Washington Park. For the bottom of the eighth inning, Graham was sent in to play right field, replacing George Browne. In the top of the ninth, Graham was on deck when Claude Elliott flied out for the third and final out. Graham played the bottom of the ninth at right field but never came to bat, as the Giants won 11–1. That game turned out to be his only appearance in the major leagues. His story was popularized in Shoeless Joe, a novel by W. P. Kinsella, and the subsequent 1989 film Field of Dreams.
- July 4 – In one of the greatest duels in baseball history, Cy Young and Rube Waddell go toe to toe in Boston. The A's and Waddell win 4–2 in 20 innings.
- July 22 – Weldon Henley of the Philadelphia Athletics pitches a no-hitter in the first game of a doubleheader against the St. Louis Browns. Philadelphia wins, 6–0.
- August 9 – Mistaking her husband for a burglar, the mother of minor league outfielder Ty Cobb shoots and kills him, an incident that will be cited as the reason for Cobb's intense desire to succeed. He will make his major league debut with the Tigers later this month.
- August 16 – The Chicago Cubs purchase the contract of pitcher Jack Pfiester from the Omaha Rourkes of the Western League.
- September 1 – The Chicago White Stockings draft Branch Rickey from the Dallas Giants from the Texas League.
- September 6 – Frank Smith of the Chicago White Sox pitches a no-hitter in the second game of a doubleheader against the Detroit Tigers, as the Sox win 15–0.
- September 27 – Boston American pitcher Bill Dinneen tosses a no-hitter in a 2–0 victory against the Chicago White Sox.
- October 5 – For the first time in Major League history, two teams with over 100 losses played each other, when the Brooklyn Superbas (103 losses) and Boston Beaneaters (100 losses) met in their final series of the season. The game ends with Brooklyn defeating Boston.
- October 9 – Christy Mathewson of the New York Giants outpitches 26-game-winner Eddie Plank and the Philadelphia Athletics, 3–0, in the first game of an all-shutout World Series.
- October 14 – In Game 5 of the World Series, the New York Giants defeat the Philadelphia Athletics, 2–0, to claim their first world championship, four games to one.
- October 22 – The Los Angeles Angels of the Pacific Coast League beats the visiting Portland Beavers, 3–2, in 11 innings. Los Angeles pitcher Bill Tozer ends his PCL record of 48 consecutive shutout inning-streak when Portland scored two unearned runs in the third inning.

== Births ==
=== January ===
- January 2 – Red Kress
- January 2 – Pinky Whitney
- January 7 – Frank Grube
- January 13 – Charlie Wilson
- January 17 – Ray Cunningham
- January 20 – Ike Danning
- January 21 – Larry Boerner
- January 24 – Rufus Smith

=== February ===
- February 5 – Joe Hutcheson
- February 6 – Eddie Hunter
- February 7 – Cy Moore
- February 11 – Ed Walsh Jr.
- February 15 – Hal Lee
- February 17 – Ed Brandt
- February 23 – Les Barnhart
- February 24 – Lynn Nelson
- February 26 – Emmett Nelson

=== March ===
- March 1 – Jim Beckman
- March 11 – Joe Mellana
- March 14 – Jack Rothrock
- March 21 – Joe Samuels
- March 27 – Johnny Gill
- March 28 – Allen Benson

=== April ===
- April 3 – Gordie Hinkle
- April 7 – Joe Hassler
- April 9 – Earl Caldwell
- April 10 – Ed Strelecki
- April 13 – Biff Wysong
- April 18 – Mal Moss
- April 25 – Belve Bean

=== May ===
- May 3 – Red Ruffing
- May 5 – Jack Ryan
- May 7 – Dave Barbee
- May 15 – Chet Falk
- May 18 – Arndt Jorgens
- May 23 – Harry Child
- May 31 – Peaches Davis

=== June ===
- June 5 – Heliodoro Díaz
- June 5 – Owen Kahn
- June 10 – Vic Harris
- June 10 – Danny MacFayden
- June 17 – Chink Outen
- June 25 – Johnny Pasek
- June 30 – Art Scharein

=== July ===
- July 6 – Ned Porter
- July 13 – Tiny Chaplin
- July 16 – Lou Garland
- July 22 – Doc Cramer
- July 24 – Ed Montague
- July 26 – Sam Leslie
- July 27 – Leo Durocher
- July 27 – Rudy Leopold
- July 30 – Hal Finney

=== August ===
- August 5 – Ray Pepper
- August 6 – Ed Roetz
- August 7 – Jim Cronin
- August 10 – Jim Oglesby
- August 10 – Willie Wells
- August 10 – Ed Wineapple
- August 12 – Don Hurst
- August 17 – Johnny Watwood
- August 21 – Jim Mosolf
- August 21 – Frank Waddey
- August 23 – Phil Page
- August 31 – Frank Pearce
- August 31 – Jack White

=== September ===
- September 2 – Bernie James
- September 5 – Bill McGhee
- September 5 – Danny Musser
- September 8 – Ed Grimes
- September 9 – Charlie Perkins
- September 10 – Irv Jeffries
- September 11 – Glenn Spencer
- September 15 – Vance Page
- September 15 – Henry Peploski
- September 16 – Dinny McNamara
- September 16 – Joe Vance
- September 17 – Red Parnell
- September 22 – Larry Bettencourt
- September 25 – Greg Mulleavy
- September 26 – Pat Caraway
- September 26 – Johnny Hodapp
- September 26 – Millito Navarro
- September 27 – Marty Lang
- September 28 – Paul Easterling
- September 29 – Bruce Cunningham
- September 30 – Luther Harvel

=== October ===
- October 3 – Johnny Riddle
- October 10 – Wally Berger
- October 10 – John Stone
- October 11 – Joel Hunt
- October 12 – Rick Ferrell
- October 19 – Mike Meola
- October 24 – Jack Russell
- October 24 – Charlie Small
- October 25 – Joe Malay

=== November ===
- November 4 – Lefty Willis
- November 5 – Carl Fischer
- November 13 – Milt Shoffner
- November 21 – Freddie Lindstrom
- November 21 – Les Mallon
- November 26 – Bob Johnson
- November 28 – Ed Chapman
- November 29 – Harlan Pyle

=== December ===
- December 1 – Buddy Dear
- December 2 – Leon Williams
- December 5 – Gus Mancuso
- December 9 – Adam Comorosky
- December 11 – Al Weston
- December 14 – Bob Weiland
- December 21 – Fred Koster
- December 30 – John Pomorski

== Deaths ==
=== January–March ===
- January 18 – Fergy Malone, 63, Irish catcher and manager in a career that spanned 14 years from 1871 to 1884.
- January 28 – Len Stockwell, 45, outfielder for the Cleveland Blues and Spiders teams.
- February 6 – Ned Cuthbert, 59, outfielder who hit .254 with five teams between 1871 and 1884.
- February 13 – Bill Eagan, 35, second baseman for three teams from 1891 to 1898.
- February 13 – Ralph Ham, 55, outfielder for the 1871 Rockford Forest Citys.
- February 18 – Tom Poorman, 47, outfielder for five teams from 1880 to 1888, who led American Association in triples and stolen bases in its 1887 season.
- March 3 – Stump Weidman, 44, pitcher for nine seasons from 1880 to 1888, most notably for the Detroit Wolverines.
- March 7 – John Murphy, 47, pitcher who posted a 5–12 record for the Altoona Mountain City and Wilmington Quicksteps in the 1884 season.
- March 15 – Pete Meegan, 42, pitcher for two seasons, 1884 and 1885 with the Richmond Virginians and the Pittsburgh Alleghenys.
- March 18 – Dick Higham, 53, English right fielder and catcher who led National League in doubles in its 1876 first season, in runs and doubles in 1878; later an umpire, barred from the sport in 1882.
- March 22 – Gus Krock, 38, pitched from 1888 to 1890 for the Cubs, Hoosiers, Nationals and Bisons.

=== April–June ===
- April 24 – Jim Gardner, 30, pitcher and infielder for the Pittsburgh Pirates/Orphans from 1895 to 1902.
- April 25 – Jackie Hayes, 43, catcher/outfielder for seven different teams from 1882 to 1990.
- May 7 – Al Mays, 39, pitcher who went 53–90 with a 3.91 ERA for the Colonels/Metropolitans/Bridegrooms/Solons from 1885 to 1890.
- May 13 – Sam Gillen, 38, infielder for the 1893 Pittsburgh Pirates and the 1897 Philadelphia Phillies.
- May 17 – John Abadie, 50, first baseman who batted a combined .224 with the Philadelphia Centennials and the Brooklyn Atlantics in 1875.
- May 22 – Ed Kennedy, 49, outfielder who played from 1883 through 1886 for the New York Metropolitans and Brooklyn Grays.
- May 22 – George Zettlein, 60, pitcher who won 125 games in the National Association and ended Cincinnati's 84-game winning streak in 1870.
- May 24 – Bill Goodenough, 41, outfielder for the 1893 St. Louis Browns.
- May 25 – Paul Cook, 42, catcher who played from 1884 to 1891 for the Quakers, Colonels, Ward's Wonders and Browns.
- June 1 – Harry East, 43, third baseman for the 1882 Baltimore Orioles.
- June 30 – Pete Dowling, 28, pitcher who posted a 39–65 record with the Colonels, Brewers and Blues from 1897 to 1901.

=== July–September ===
- July 28 – Jim Tray, 45, catcher for the 1884 Indianapolis Hoosiers.
- July 28 – Harry Von der Horst, 54, former owner of the Baltimore Orioles and Brooklyn Superbas.
- August 2 – George Snyder, 57, pitched briefly for the 1882 Philadelphia Athletics.
- August 27 – Heinie Kappel, 41, infielder who hit a combined .269 for the Cincinnati Red Stockings (1887–88) and Columbus Solons (1899).
- September 10 – Pete Browning, 44, legendary outfielder who helped to create the Louisville Slugger baseball bat and hit a .341 lifetime for the second-highest mark among right-handed hitters, who also won three batting titles and hit for the cycle twice, in a career that spanned from 1882 to 1894.
- September 11 – Jerry McCormick, 43, third baseman who played from 1893 to 1984 with three different teams in the American Association and the Union Association.
- September 12 – Billy Taylor, 34, infielder who hit .250 in nine games for the 1898 Louisville Colonels.

=== October–December ===
- October 8 – Bill Sullivan, 36, pitcher/outfielder who posted a 1–4 record and hit .091 for the 1890 Syracuse Stars.
- October 17 – Joe Otten, 35, Dutch outfielder and catcher who hit .241 in 26 games for the 1895 St. Louis Browns.
- November 14 – John Connor, 44, pitcher for three teams from 1884 to 1885.
- November 23 – Bill Hanlon, 29, first base who played for the 1903 Chicago Cubs.
- December 6 – Jack Leary, 48, outfielder, infielder, and pitcher for five seasons from 1880 to 1884.
- December 31 – Frank Bonner, 36, infielder who played from 1894 through 1903.
