= Harry Arndt =

American baseball player (1879–1921)

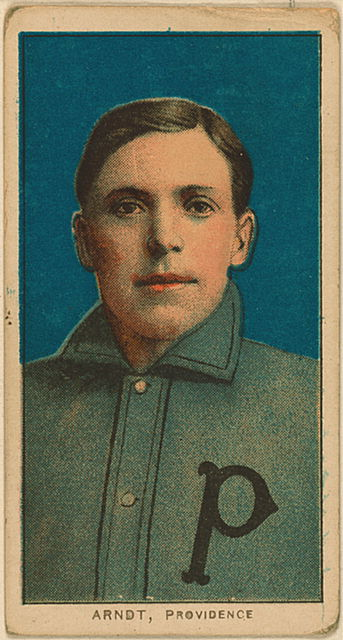
- Arndt in 1910
- Second baseman / Outfielder
- Born: February 12, 1879; South Bend, Indiana, U.S.
- Died: March 25, 1921 (aged 42); South Bend, Indiana, U.S.
- Batted: Right Threw: Right

MLB debut
- July 2, 1902, for the Detroit Tigers

Last MLB appearance
- May 25, 1907, for the St. Louis Cardinals

MLB statistics
- Batting average: .248
- Home runs: 6
- Runs batted in: 99
- Stats at Baseball Reference

Teams
- Detroit Tigers (1902); Baltimore Orioles (1902); St. Louis Cardinals (1905–1907)

Harry John Arndt (February 12, 1879 – March 25, 1921) was an American Major League Baseball (MLB) second baseman. He was born in South Bend, Indiana. He played four seasons, with the Detroit Tigers, Baltimore Orioles, and St. Louis Cardinals. Arndt played in 271 games with 244 hits in 985 at bats. He had a .248 average with six home runs and 99 runs batted in. Arndt died on March 25, 1921, in his home town of South Bend.
