= Ed MacGamwell =

American baseball player (1878-1924)

- First baseman
- Born: January 10, 1878; Buffalo, New York, U.S.
- Died: May 26, 1924 (aged 46); Albany, New York, U.S.
- Batted: Left Threw: Left

MLB debut
- April 14, 1905, for the Brooklyn Superbas

Last MLB appearance
- April 18, 1905, for the Brooklyn Superbas

MLB statistics
- Batting average: .250
- Home runs: 0
- Runs batted in: 0
- Stats at Baseball Reference

Teams
- Brooklyn Superbas (1905)

Edward M. MacGamwell (January 10, 1878 in Buffalo, New York – May 26, 1924 in Albany, New York), was an American professional baseball player who played first base in four games for the 1905 Brooklyn Superbas.
