= Art Hoelskoetter =

American baseball player (1882–1954)

- Utility player
- Born: September 30, 1882; St. Louis, Missouri, U.S.
- Died: August 3, 1954 (aged 71); St. Louis, Missouri, U.S.
- Batted: Right Threw: Right

MLB debut
- September 10, 1905, for the St. Louis Cardinals

Last MLB appearance
- October 3, 1908, for the St. Louis Cardinals

MLB statistics
- Batting average: .236
- Home runs: 2
- Runs batted in: 53
- Stats at Baseball Reference

Teams
- St. Louis Cardinals (1905–1908)

Arthur William Hoelskoetter (September 30, 1882 – August 3, 1954) was a baseball player with the St. Louis Cardinals from 1905 to 1908. Hoelskoetter was a utility player and a jack of all trades. Hoelskoetter is the only major league baseball player to have played at least 15 games as pitcher, catcher, first baseman, second baseman, third baseman, shortstop and outfielder.
