= Billy Taylor (third baseman) =

American baseball player (1870–1905)

- Third baseman
- Born: December , 1870; Butler, Kentucky
- Died: September 12, 1905; Cincinnati, Ohio
- Batted: Switch Threw: Right

MLB debut
- September 19, 1898, for the Louisville Colonels

Last MLB appearance
- October 15, 1898, for the Louisville Colonels

MLB statistics
- Batting average: .250
- Home runs: 0
- Runs batted in: 2
- Stats at Baseball Reference

Teams
- Louisville Colonels (1898)

William H. Taylor (1870–1905) was a Major League Baseball player for the Louisville Colonels in 1898. He played in nine games, mostly at third base, going 6-for-24 with 2 RBI.

== Sources ==
- Career statistics from Baseball Reference · Retrosheet · Baseball Almanac
