= John Otten =

American baseball player (1870–1905)

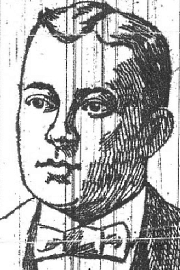
- Catcher
- Born: August 21, 1870; Chicago, Illinois, U.S.
- Died: October 17, 1905 (aged 35); Chicago, Illinois, U.S.
- Batted: Unknown Threw: Right

MLB debut
- July 5, 1895, for the St. Louis Browns

Last MLB appearance
- September 28, 1895, for the St. Louis Browns

MLB statistics
- Batting average: .241
- Home runs: 0
- Runs batted in: 8
- Stats at Baseball Reference

Teams
- St. Louis Browns (1895)

John G. Otten (August 21, 1870 – October 17, 1905) was an American catcher for the St. Louis Browns of the National League in 1895.

== Biography ==
Otten first played baseball in amateur leagues beginning in 1889 after growing up in Chicago. An injury in the catching position led manager Joe Quinn of the St. Louis Browns to get on the wire to bring Otten into the majors. However, his major league career would only last a few games due to an injury suffered on July 7 on a pitch taken to his thumb while attempting a bunt. It affected his ability to catch runners behind the plate and it would continue to hinder for the rest of his playing days. He dabbled in amateur baseball for the next couple of years until 1897. He worked as a book glider for the rest of his days in Chicago before dying of pneumonia in 1905. He is buried in Forest Home Cemetery in Illinois.
