= Joe Malay =

American baseball player (1905-1989)

- First baseman
- Born: October 25, 1905; Brooklyn, New York, U.S.
- Died: March 19, 1989 (aged 83); Bridgeport, Connecticut, U.S.
- Batted: Left Threw: Left

MLB debut
- September 7, 1933, for the New York Giants

Last MLB appearance
- April 19, 1935, for the New York Giants

MLB statistics
- Batting average: .160
- Stats at Baseball Reference

Teams
- New York Giants (1933, 1935)

Joseph Charles Malay (October 25, 1905 – March 19, 1989) was an American professional baseball player who played in nine games for the New York Giants in 1933 and 1935. He batted and threw left-handed.

Malay's father, Charlie Malay, played for the Brooklyn Dodgers in 1905.

== See also ==
- List of second-generation Major League Baseball players
