= Charlie Chech =

American baseball player (1878–1938)

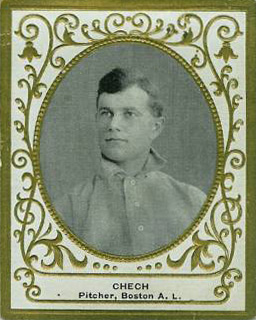
- Pitcher
- Born: April 27, 1878; Madison, Wisconsin, U.S.
- Died: January 31, 1938 (aged 59); Los Angeles, California, U.S.
- Batted: Right Threw: Right

MLB debut
- April 14, 1905, for the Cincinnati Reds

Last MLB appearance
- July 19, 1909, for the Boston Red Sox

MLB statistics
- Win–loss record: 33-30
- Earned run average: 2.52
- Strikeouts: 187
- Stats at Baseball Reference

Teams
- Cincinnati Reds (1905–1906); Cleveland Naps (1908); Boston Red Sox (1909)

Charles William Chech (April 27, 1878 – January 31, 1938) was an American pitcher who played in Major League Baseball between 1905 and 1909. Chech batted and threw right-handed. He was born in Madison, Wisconsin.

== Early life ==
Charlie Chech was born April 27, 1878, in Madison, Wisconsin.

== Playing career ==
A curveball specialist, Chech reached the majors in 1905 with the Cincinnati Reds, spending two years with them before moving to the Cleveland Naps 1908 and Boston Red Sox (1909). His most productive season came in his rookie year for Cincinnati, when he recorded career-highs in wins (14), strikeouts (79), starts (25), complete games (20) and innings pitched 267 2/3, while posting a 2.89 ERA. After going 11–7 for Cleveland, he was sent to the Red Sox with Jack Ryan in the same trade that brought Cy Young to Boston.

In a four-season career, Chech posted a 33–30 record with 187 strikeouts and a 2,52 ERA in 606 innings. Following his Major League career, he played for the St. Paul Apostles of the American Association.

== Personal life ==
Chech married Edith Inez Elliot, daughter of James Elliot and Martha Lavinia (Halbach) Elliot, on 12 October 1904 in St. Paul, Ramsey County, Minnesota. Returning to Saint Paul, the 1910 U.S. Census shows Chech had become a druggist, supporting his wife and his widowed mother-in-law. Edith died in California on 23 September 1916 of Addison's disease.

Chech married secondly to Catherine M Tierney on 29 Nov 1918 in Los Angeles County, California. The 1920 and 1930 censuses indicate he had established a career as an insurance writer and salesman.

Chech died in Los Angeles on 31 January 1938, at the age of 59.
