= Jim Tray =

American baseball player (1860–1905)

- Catcher/First baseman
- Born: February 14, 1860; Jackson, Michigan, U.S.
- Died: July 28, 1905 (aged 45); Jackson, Michigan, U.S.
- Batted: Unknown Threw: Unknown

MLB debut
- September 6, 1884, for the Indianapolis Hoosiers

Last MLB appearance
- September 21, 1884, for the Indianapolis Hoosiers

MLB statistics
- Batting average: .286
- Home runs: 0
- Runs batted in: 0
- Stats at Baseball Reference

Teams
- Indianapolis Hoosiers (1884)

James Tray (February 14, 1860 – July 28, 1905) was an American Major League Baseball catcher for the 1884 Indianapolis Hoosiers. He played in the minors through 1889.
