= Sammy Strang =

American baseball player (1876–1932)

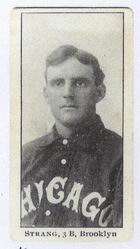
- Second baseman / Third baseman
- Born: December 16, 1876; Chattanooga, Tennessee, U.S.
- Died: March 13, 1932 (aged 55); Chattanooga, Tennessee, U.S.
- Batted: Switch Threw: Right

MLB debut
- July 10, 1896, for the Louisville Colonels

Last MLB appearance
- June 2, 1908, for the New York Giants

MLB statistics
- Batting average: .269
- Home runs: 16
- Runs batted in: 253
- Stats at Baseball Reference

Teams
- Louisville Colonels (1896); Chicago Orphans (1900); New York Giants (1901); Chicago White Sox (1902); Chicago Orphans (1902); Brooklyn Superbas (1903–1904); New York Giants (1904–1908)

Career highlights and awards
- World Series champion (1905)

Samuel Strang Nicklin (December 16, 1876 – March 13, 1932) was an American professional baseball player for the Louisville Colonels (1896), Chicago Orphans (1900 and 1902), New York Giants (1901 and 1905–08), Chicago White Sox (1902) and Brooklyn Superbas (1903–04). He also played college football for the Tennessee Volunteers.

== Biography ==
Strang was born in Chattanooga, Tennessee. He helped the Giants win the 1905 World Series. He led the National League in On-base percentage (.423) in 1906. In 10 seasons he played in 903 games and had 16 home runs, 253 RBI, 216 stolen bases and a .269 batting average.

After his playing career, he was the baseball coach at Georgia Tech in 1902 and Army from 1909 to 1917. Strang died in Chattanooga, Tennessee, at age 55. He was buried in its National Cemetery.

Sammy was a descendant of John Penn, a signer of the Declaration of Independence. He was a distant relative of First Lady Laura Bush.

== See also ==
- List of Major League Baseball career stolen bases leaders
