= Bob Hall (outfielder) =

American baseball player (1878-1950)

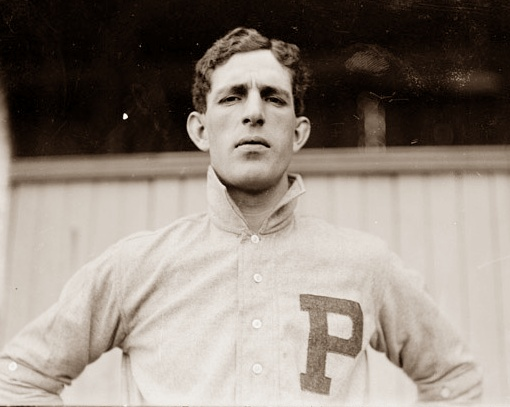
- Outfielder / Infielder
- Born: December 20, 1878; Baltimore, Maryland, US
- Died: December 1, 1950 (aged 71); Wellesley, Massachusetts, US
- Batted: Unknown Threw: Right

MLB debut
- April 18, 1904, for the Philadelphia Phillies

Last MLB appearance
- October 7, 1905, for the Brooklyn Superbas

MLB statistics
- Batting average: .203
- Home runs: 2
- Runs batted in: 31
- Stats at Baseball Reference

Teams
- Philadelphia Phillies (1904); New York Giants (1905); Brooklyn Superbas (1905)

Robert Prill Hall (December 20, 1878 – December 1, 1950) was an American professional baseball player who played infield and outfield during the 1904 and 1905 seasons. He was a utility player including games at right field, Center field, left field, first base, second base, shortstop, and third base. Bob played for the Philadelphia Phillies in 1904, and the New York Giants and Brooklyn Superbas in 1905. Hall made his debut on April 18, 1904. In 103 career games, he had 75 hits in 369 at bats, which is a .203 average. He had 2 home runs, 32 RBIs, and 13 stolen bases. Hall played in his final game on October 7, 1905, and died on December 1, 1950, in Wellesley, Massachusetts.

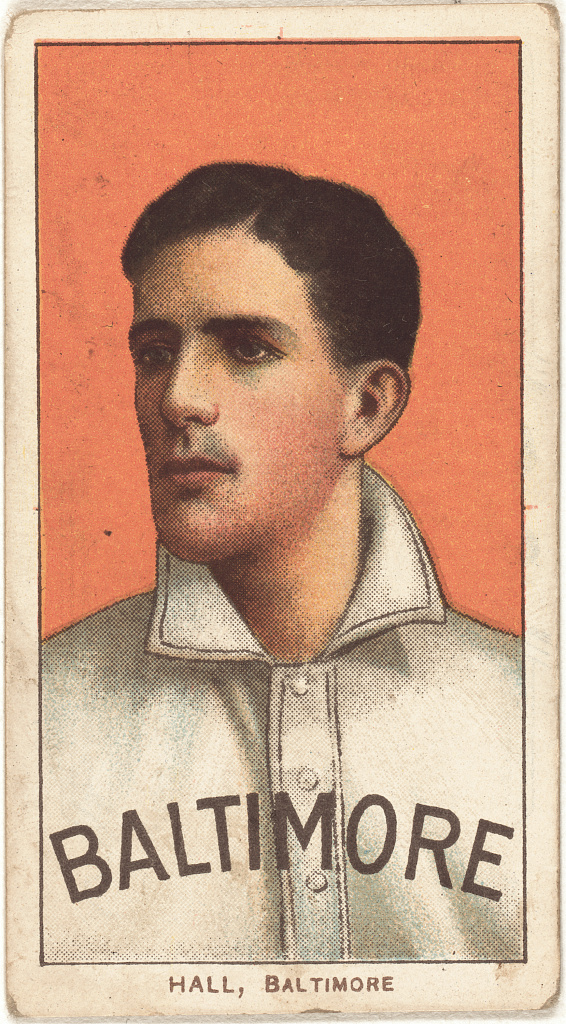
Bob Hall
