= 1951 Washington Senators season =

1951 Washington Senators
- League: American League
- Ballpark: Griffith Stadium
- City: Washington, D.C.
- Record: 62–92 (.403)
- League place: 7th
- Owners: Clark Griffith (majority owner)
- Managers: Bucky Harris
- Television: WTTG (Arch McDonald, Bob Wolff)
- Radio: WWDC (FM) (Arch McDonald, Bob Wolff)

The 1951 Washington Senators won 62 games, lost 92, and finished in seventh place in the American League. They were managed by Bucky Harris and played home games at Griffith Stadium.

== Offseason ==
- December 4, 1950: Rubén Gómez was drafted by the Senators from the St. Jean Braves in the 1950 minor league draft.

== Regular season ==
=== Season standings ===
American League
| Team | W | L | Pct. | GB | Home | Road |
|---|---|---|---|---|---|---|
| New York Yankees | 98 | 56 | .636 | — | 56‍–‍22 | 42‍–‍34 |
| Cleveland Indians | 93 | 61 | .604 | 5 | 53‍–‍24 | 40‍–‍37 |
| Boston Red Sox | 87 | 67 | .565 | 11 | 50‍–‍25 | 37‍–‍42 |
| Chicago White Sox | 81 | 73 | .526 | 17 | 39‍–‍38 | 42‍–‍35 |
| Detroit Tigers | 73 | 81 | .474 | 25 | 36‍–‍41 | 37‍–‍40 |
| Philadelphia Athletics | 70 | 84 | .455 | 28 | 38‍–‍41 | 32‍–‍43 |
| Washington Senators | 62 | 92 | .403 | 36 | 32‍–‍44 | 30‍–‍48 |
| St. Louis Browns | 52 | 102 | .338 | 46 | 24‍–‍53 | 28‍–‍49 |

=== Record vs. opponents ===
1951 American League record Sources:
| Team | BOS | CWS | CLE | DET | NYY | PHA | SLB | WSH |
|---|---|---|---|---|---|---|---|---|
| Boston | — | 11–11 | 8–14 | 12–10 | 11–11 | 15–7 | 15–7 | 15–7 |
| Chicago | 11–11 | — | 12–10–1 | 12–10 | 8–14 | 9–13 | 15–7 | 14–8 |
| Cleveland | 14–8 | 10–12–1 | — | 17–5 | 7–15 | 16–6 | 16–6 | 13–9 |
| Detroit | 10–12 | 10–12 | 5–17 | — | 10–12 | 13–9 | 12–10 | 13–9 |
| New York | 11–11 | 14–8 | 15–7 | 12–10 | — | 13–9 | 17–5 | 16–6 |
| Philadelphia | 7–15 | 13–9 | 6–16 | 9–13 | 9–13 | — | 14–8 | 12–10 |
| St. Louis | 7–15 | 7–15 | 6–16 | 10–12 | 5–17 | 8–14 | — | 9–13 |
| Washington | 7–15 | 8–14 | 9–13 | 9–13 | 6–16 | 10–12 | 13–9 | — |

=== Notable transactions ===
- June 1951: Rubén Gómez was returned by the Washington Senators to the St. Jean Braves.

=== Roster ===
1951 Washington Senators
Roster
| Pitchers: 19 Gene Bearden; 24 Alton Brown; 30 Sandy Consuegra; 21 Tom Ferrick; 17 Mickey Harris; 18 Joe Haynes; 20 Sid Hudson; 24 Don Johnson; 21 Bob Kuzava; 22 Connie Marrero; 23 Julio Moreno; 19,29 Bob Porterfield; 29 Bob Ross; 27 Fred Sanford; 28 Al Sima; 27,31 Dick Starr; 19 Hank Wyse | Catchers: 11 Mickey Grasso; 15 Mike Guerra; 10 Clyde Kluttz; 10 Len Okrie; 25 Frank Sacka; Infielders: 4 Sam Dente; 26 Roy Hawes; 7 Cass Michaels; 16 Willy Miranda; 35 Pete Runnels; 36 Fred Taylor; 6 Gene Verble; 3 Mickey Vernon; 1 Eddie Yost | Outfielders: 25 Frank Campos; 2 Gil Coan; 12 Mike McCormick; 14 Sam Mele; 8 Irv Noren; 29 Dan Porter; 5 Sherry Robertson | Manager: 50 Bucky Harris; Coaches: 54 Nick Altrock; 52 Joe Fitzgerald; 51 Clyde Milan; 53 George Myatt |

== Player stats ==
| = Indicates team leader |

| = Indicates league leader |

=== Batting ===
==== Starters by position ====
Note: Pos = Position; G = Games played; AB = At bats; H = Hits; Avg. = Batting average; HR = Home runs; RBI = Runs batted in

| Pos | Player | G | AB | H | Avg. | HR | RBI |
|---|---|---|---|---|---|---|---|
| C | Mike Guerra | 72 | 214 | 43 | .201 | 1 | 20 |
| 1B | Mickey Vernon | 141 | 546 | 160 | .293 | 9 | 87 |
| 2B | Cass Michaels | 138 | 485 | 125 | .258 | 4 | 45 |
| SS | Pete Runnels | 78 | 273 | 76 | .278 | 0 | 25 |
| 3B | Eddie Yost | 154 | 568 | 161 | .283 | 12 | 65 |
| OF | Sam Mele | 143 | 558 | 153 | .274 | 5 | 94 |
| OF | Irv Noren | 129 | 509 | 142 | .279 | 8 | 86 |
| OF | Gil Coan | 135 | 538 | 163 | .303 | 9 | 62 |

==== Other batters ====
Note: G = Games played; AB = At bats; H = Hits; Avg. = Batting average; HR = Home runs; RBI = Runs batted in

| Player | G | AB | H | Avg. | HR | RBI |
|---|---|---|---|---|---|---|
| Sam Dente | 88 | 273 | 65 | .238 | 0 | 29 |
| Mike McCormick | 81 | 243 | 70 | .288 | 1 | 23 |
| Gene Verble | 68 | 177 | 36 | .203 | 0 | 15 |
| Mickey Grasso | 52 | 175 | 36 | .206 | 1 | 14 |
| Clyde Kluttz | 53 | 159 | 49 | .308 | 1 | 22 |
| Sherry Robertson | 62 | 111 | 21 | .189 | 1 | 10 |
| Frank Campos | 8 | 26 | 11 | .423 | 0 | 3 |
| Dan Porter | 13 | 19 | 4 | .211 | 0 | 0 |
| Frank Sacka | 7 | 16 | 4 | .250 | 0 | 3 |
| Fred Taylor | 6 | 12 | 2 | .167 | 0 | 0 |
| Willy Miranda | 7 | 9 | 4 | .444 | 0 | 0 |
| Len Okrie | 5 | 8 | 1 | .125 | 0 | 0 |
| Roy Hawes | 3 | 6 | 1 | .167 | 0 | 0 |

=== Pitching ===
==== Starting pitchers ====
Note: G = Games pitched; IP = Innings pitched; W = Wins; L = Losses; ERA = Earned run average; SO = Strikeouts

| Player | G | IP | W | L | ERA | SO |
|---|---|---|---|---|---|---|
| Connie Marrero | 25 | 187.0 | 11 | 9 | 3.90 | 66 |
| Don Johnson | 21 | 143.2 | 7 | 11 | 3.95 | 52 |
| Sid Hudson | 23 | 138.2 | 5 | 12 | 5.13 | 43 |
| Bob Porterfield | 19 | 133.1 | 9 | 8 | 3.24 | 53 |
| Dick Starr | 11 | 61.1 | 1 | 7 | 5.58 | 17 |
| Bob Kuzava | 8 | 52.1 | 3 | 3 | 5.50 | 22 |
| Fred Sanford | 7 | 37.0 | 2 | 3 | 6.57 | 12 |
| Gene Bearden | 1 | 2.2 | 0 | 0 | 16.88 | 1 |

==== Other pitchers ====
Note: G = Games pitched; IP = Innings pitched; W = Wins; L = Losses; ERA = Earned run average; SO = Strikeouts

| Player | G | IP | W | L | ERA | SO |
|---|---|---|---|---|---|---|
| Sandy Consuegra | 40 | 146.0 | 7 | 8 | 4.01 | 31 |
| Julio Moreno | 31 | 132.2 | 5 | 11 | 4.88 | 37 |
| Al Sima | 18 | 77.0 | 3 | 7 | 4.79 | 26 |
| Hank Wyse | 3 | 9.1 | 0 | 0 | 9.64 | 3 |

==== Relief pitchers ====
Note: G = Games pitched; W = Wins; L = Losses; SV = Saves; ERA = Earned run average; SO = Strikeouts

| Player | G | W | L | SV | ERA | SO |
|---|---|---|---|---|---|---|
| Mickey Harris | 41 | 6 | 8 | 4 | 3.81 | 47 |
| Joe Haynes | 26 | 1 | 4 | 2 | 4.56 | 18 |
| Tom Ferrick | 22 | 2 | 0 | 2 | 2.38 | 17 |
| Bob Ross | 11 | 0 | 1 | 0 | 6.54 | 23 |
| Alton Brown | 7 | 0 | 0 | 0 | 9.26 | 7 |

== Farm system ==
| Level | Team | League | Manager |
|---|---|---|---|
| AA | Chattanooga Lookouts | Southern Association | Jack Onslow |
| B | Havana Cubanos | Florida International League | Adolfo Luque |
| B | Charlotte Hornets | Tri-State League | Cal Ermer |
| C | Erie Sailors | Middle Atlantic League | Pete Appleton |
| D | Roanoke Rapids Jays | Coastal Plain League | Morrie Aderholt |
| D | Orlando Senators | Florida State League | Ed Levy |
| D | Fulton Railroaders | KITTY League | Sam Lamitina |

LEAGUE CHAMPIONS: Fulton
