= 1953 Washington Senators season =

1953 Washington Senators
- League: American League
- Ballpark: Griffith Stadium
- City: Washington, D.C.
- Record: 76–76 (.500)
- League place: 5th
- Owners: Clark Griffith (majority owner)
- Managers: Bucky Harris
- Television: WTTG
- Radio: WWDC (FM) (Arch McDonald, Bob Wolff, Bailey Goss)

The 1953 Washington Senators won 76 games, lost 76, and finished in fifth place in the American League. They were managed by Bucky Harris and played home games at Griffith Stadium. This was their last winning season until 1962.

== Regular season ==
=== Season standings ===
American League
Team	W	L	Pct.	GB	Home	Road
New York Yankees	99	52	.656	—	50‍–‍27	49‍–‍25
Cleveland Indians	92	62	.597	8½	53‍–‍24	39‍–‍38
Chicago White Sox	89	65	.578	11½	41‍–‍36	48‍–‍29
Boston Red Sox	84	69	.549	16	38‍–‍38	46‍–‍31
Washington Senators	76	76	.500	23½	39‍–‍36	37‍–‍40
Detroit Tigers	60	94	.390	40½	30‍–‍47	30‍–‍47
Philadelphia Athletics	59	95	.383	41½	27‍–‍50	32‍–‍45
St. Louis Browns	54	100	.351	46½	23‍–‍54	31‍–‍46

=== Record vs. opponents ===
1953 American League record Sources:
Team	BOS	CWS	CLE	DET	NYY	PHA	SLB	WSH
Boston	—	6–16	13–9	13–9	10–11	15–7	17–5	10–12
Chicago	16–6	—	11–11–1	14–8–1	9–13	10–12	17–5	12–10
Cleveland	9–13	11–11–1	—	14–8	11–11	19–3	17–5	11–11
Detroit	9–13	8–14–1	8–14	—	6–16	11–11–3	7–15	11–11
New York	11–10	13–9	11–11	16–6	—	17–5	17–5	14–6
Philadelphia	7–15	12–10	3–19	11–11–3	5–17	—	13–9	8–14
St. Louis	5–17	5–17	5–17	15–7	5–17	9–13	—	10–12
Washington	12–10	10–12	11–11	11–11	6–14	14–8	12–10	—

=== Roster ===
1953 Washington Senators
Roster
Pitchers: 27,30 Tommy Byrne; 30 Sandy Consuegra; 16 Sonny Dixon; 25 Jerry Lane; 22 Connie Marrero; 20 Walt Masterson; 23 Julio Moreno; 49 Jim Pearce; 19 Bob Porterfield; 35,31 Johnny Schmitz; 17 Spec Shea; 36 Al Sima; 38,23 Bunky Stewart; 18 Chuck Stobbs; 31,32 Dean Stone	Catchers: 37 Ed Fitz Gerald; 11 Mickey Grasso; 10 Bob Oldis; 8 Les Peden; 10 Frank Sacka; Infielders: 4 Floyd Baker; 15 Yo-Yo Davalillo; 28 Mel Hoderlein; 29 Tony Roig; 35 Pete Runnels; 6 Jerry Snyder; 12 Wayne Terwilliger; 15 Gene Verble; 3 Mickey Vernon; 1 Eddie Yost	Outfielders: 30 Bruce Barmes; 7 Jim Busby; 2 Gil Coan; 4 Jackie Jensen; 6 Carmen Mauro; 26 Kite Thomas; 24 Clyde Vollmer; 26 Ken Wood; Other batters: 25 Frank Campos	Manager: 50 Bucky Harris; Coaches: 54 Nick Altrock; 52 Joe Fitzgerald; 55 Joe Haynes; 51 Heinie Manush; 53 George Myatt

== Player stats ==
=== Batting ===
= Indicates team leader

= Indicates league leader

==== Starters by position ====
Note: Pos = Position; G = Games played; AB = At bats; H = Hits; Avg. = Batting average; HR = Home runs; RBI = Runs batted in

Pos	Player	G	AB	H	Avg.	HR	RBI
C	Ed Fitz Gerald	88	288	72	.250	3	39
1B	Mickey Vernon	152	608	205	.337	15	115
2B	Wayne Terwilliger	134	464	117	.252	4	46
SS	Pete Runnels	137	486	125	.257	2	50
3B	Eddie Yost	152	577	157	.272	9	45
OF	Jim Busby	150	586	183	.312	6	82
OF	Jackie Jensen	147	582	147	.266	10	84
OF	Clyde Vollmer	118	408	106	.260	11	74

==== Other batters ====
Note: G = Games played; AB = At bats; H = Hits; Avg. = Batting average; HR = Home runs; RBI = Runs batted in

Player	G	AB	H	Avg.	HR	RBI
Mickey Grasso	61	196	41	.209	2	22
Gil Coan	68	168	33	.196	2	17
Jerry Snyder	29	62	21	.339	0	4
Kite Thomas	38	58	17	.293	1	12
Yo-Yo Davalillo	19	58	17	.293	0	2
Mel Hoderlein	23	47	9	.191	0	5
Ken Wood	12	33	7	.212	0	3
Les Peden	9	28	7	.250	1	1
Carmen Mauro	17	23	4	.174	0	2
Gene Verble	13	21	4	.190	0	2
Frank Sacka	7	18	5	.278	0	3
Bob Oldis	7	16	4	.250	0	3
Frank Campos	10	9	1	.111	0	2
Tony Roig	3	8	1	.125	0	0
Floyd Baker	9	7	0	.000	0	0
Bruce Barmes	5	5	1	.200	0	0

=== Pitching ===
==== Starting pitchers ====
Note: G = Games pitched; IP = Innings pitched; W = Wins; L = Losses; ERA = Earned run average; SO = Strikeouts

Player	G	IP	W	L	ERA	SO
Bob Porterfield	34	255.0	22	10	3.35	77
Walt Masterson	29	166.1	10	12	3.63	95
Spec Shea	23	164.2	12	7	3.94	38
Chuck Stobbs	27	153.0	11	8	3.29	67
Connie Marrero	22	145.2	8	7	3.03	65
Tommy Byrne	6	33.2	0	5	4.28	22
Bunky Stewart	2	15.1	0	2	4.70	3

==== Other pitchers ====
Note: G = Games pitched; IP = Innings pitched; W = Wins; L = Losses; ERA = Earned run average; SO = Strikeouts

Player	G	IP	W	L	ERA	SO
Sonny Dixon	43	120.0	5	8	3.75	40
Johnny Schmitz	24	107.2	2	7	3.68	39
Julio Moreno	12	35.1	3	1	2.80	13
Jim Pearce	4	9.1	0	1	7.71	0
Dean Stone	3	8.2	0	1	8.31	5

==== Relief pitchers ====
Note: G = Games pitched; W = Wins; L = Losses; SV = Saves; ERA = Earned run average; SO = Strikeouts

Player	G	W	L	SV	ERA	SO
Al Sima	31	2	3	1	3.42	25
Jerry Lane	20	1	4	0	4.92	26
Sandy Consuegra	4	0	0	0	10.80	0

== Farm system ==
Level	Team	League	Manager
AA	Chattanooga Lookouts	Southern Association	Cal Ermer
A	Scranton Miners	Eastern League	Morrie Aderholt
B	Charlotte Hornets	Tri-State League	Pete Appleton
D	Bluefield Blue-Grays	Appalachian League	Ivan Kuester
D	Orlando Senators	Florida State League	Donald Ford and Leslie Filkins
D	Fulton Lookouts	KITTY League	Sam Lamitina

LEAGUE CHAMPIONS: Charlotte
