= Gene Verble =

American baseball player (1928-2017)

- Shortstop/Second Baseman
- Born: June 29, 1928; Concord, North Carolina, U.S.
- Died: November 4, 2017 (aged 89); Kannapolis, North Carolina, U.S.
- Batted: Right Threw: Right

MLB debut
- April 17, 1951, for the Washington Senators

Last MLB appearance
- June 27, 1953, for the Washington Senators

MLB statistics
- Batting average: .202
- Home runs: 0
- Runs batted in: 17
- Stats at Baseball Reference

Teams
- Washington Senators (1951; 1953)

Gene Kermit Verble (June 29, 1928 – November 4, 2017) was an American shortstop and second baseman in Major League Baseball. Nicknamed "Satchel", he played a full season for the 1951 Washington Senators, as well as for part of the Senators' 1953 campaign, batting .202 with 40 hits, 17 runs batted in and no home runs in 81 games and 198 at bats.

Verble threw and batted right-handed, and stood 5 ft 10 in (1.78 m) tall and weighed 163 pounds (74 kg). He had a 14-season minor league playing career, much of it in the Double-A Southern Association playing for the Atlanta Crackers and Chattanooga Lookouts. He managed in the Washington/Minnesota Twins organization from 1957 through midseason 1961, including a stint at the Triple-A level with the 1961 Syracuse Chiefs of the International League. His 1957 Charlotte Hornets team won the Class A Sally League championship. In 1962, his final season in baseball, Verble managed the Burlington Indians, the Cleveland Indians' Class B Carolina League affiliate. His record as a minor league pilot was 387–392 (.497).

Post baseball, he owned and operated Gene's Shortstop. A corner store and gas station in the Jackson Park neighborhood of Concord, NC.

Verble died on November 4, 2017, at the age of 89.
