= Herb Gorman =

American baseball player (1924–1953)

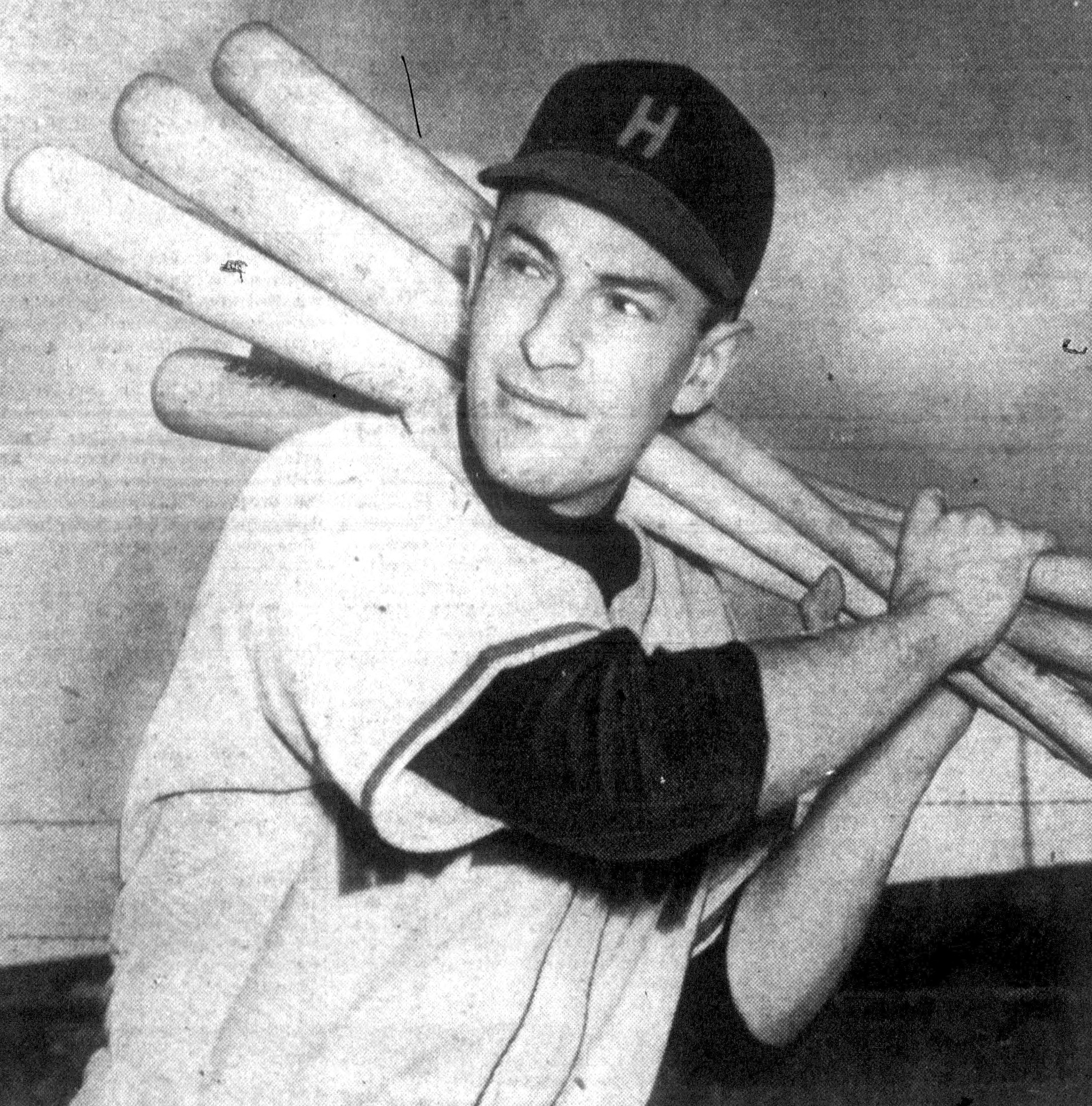
- Gorman, circa 1951
- Pinch hitter
- Born: December 19, 1924; San Francisco, California
- Died: April 5, 1953 (aged 28); San Diego, California
- Batted: Left Threw: Left

MLB debut
- April 19, 1952, for the St. Louis Cardinals

Last MLB appearance
- April 19, 1952, for the St. Louis Cardinals

MLB statistics
- Games played: 1
- Hits: 0
- At bats: 1
- Stats at Baseball Reference

Teams
- St. Louis Cardinals (1952)

Herbert Allen Gorman (December 19, 1924 – April 5, 1953) was an American professional baseball player. He had only one Major League at bat in a single game played for the St. Louis Cardinals in 1952; then, the following season, he died at age 28 after he was stricken with a fatal heart attack while he was playing a minor league game.

== Career ==
Gorman was Jewish. Born in San Francisco, he threw and batted left-handed, stood 5 feet 11 inches (1.80 m) tall, and weighed 180 pounds (82 kg). His minor league career spanned eleven seasons, from 1943 until 1953, with 1944–45 missed during Gorman's military service in the United States Coast Guard during World War II.

Originally signed by the Brooklyn Dodgers, he began his career as a first baseman and moved to the outfield in 1949. In Gorman's one MLB at bat, on April 19, 1952, at Wrigley Field, he pinch hit for Cardinals' pitcher Willard Schmidt and grounded out to second base against Cubs' starter Turk Lown. He spent the remainder of 1952 with the San Diego Padres of the top-level Pacific Coast League, batting .261 in 108 games.

After returning to the Padres in 1953, he was playing left field on April 5 in a home game against the Hollywood Stars, his former PCL team. According to accounts of the game, he had hit two doubles but left the contest when he complained of chest pain during the sixth inning. He died en route to a local hospital from a massive heart attack.

Lefty O'Doul, his manager in San Diego, commented that Gorman "never complained, never caused trouble – he just wanted to play. I wanted to see how some rookies would do, so that's why he was making his first start. But I quickly saw that Gorman should play. A quiet fellow who just minded his own business. It's a terrible loss for his family and our team."

He was interred at Oak Hill Memorial Park in San Jose.

In 2002, he was inducted into the San Francisco Hall of Fame.
