= Bucky Harris =

American baseball player and manager (1896–1977)

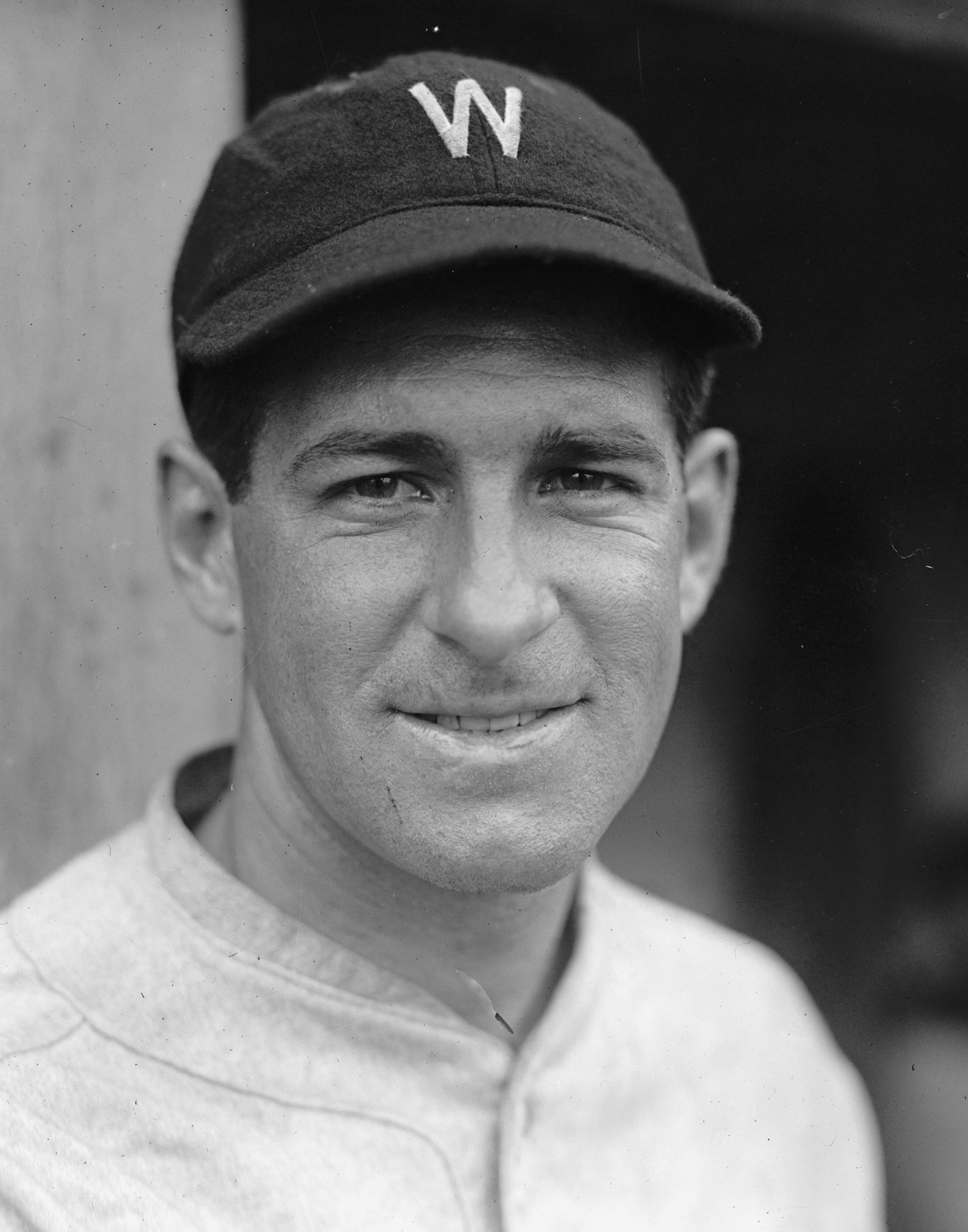
- Harris in 1925
- Second baseman / Manager
- Born: November 8, 1896; Port Jervis, New York, U.S.
- Died: November 8, 1977 (aged 81); Bethesda, Maryland, U.S.
- Batted: Right Threw: Right

MLB debut
- August 28, 1919, for the Washington Senators

Last MLB appearance
- June 12, 1931, for the Detroit Tigers

MLB statistics
- Batting average: .274
- Home runs: 9
- Runs batted in: 508
- Managerial record: 2,158–2,219–33
- Winning %: .493
- Stats at Baseball Reference
- Managerial record at Baseball Reference

Teams
- As player: Washington Senators (1919–1928); Detroit Tigers (1929, 1931); As manager: Washington Senators (1924–1928); Detroit Tigers (1929–1933); Boston Red Sox (1934); Washington Senators (1935–1942); Philadelphia Phillies (1943); New York Yankees (1947–1948); Washington Senators (1950–1954); Detroit Tigers (1955–1956)

Career highlights and awards
- 2× World Series champion (1924, 1947); Washington Nationals Ring of Honor

Member of the National

Baseball Hall of Fame
- Induction: 1975
- Election method: Veterans Committee

Stanley Raymond "Bucky" Harris (November 8, 1896 – November 8, 1977) was an American professional baseball second baseman, manager and executive. While Harris played in Major League Baseball (MLB) for the Washington Senators and Detroit Tigers, it was his long managerial career that led to his enshrinement in the Baseball Hall of Fame by the Veterans Committee in 1975.

Hired by the Senators to act as player-manager at the age of 27, Harris would lead the team to the 1924 World Series title, becoming the youngest manager to win a championship and the first rookie manager to do so (four other rookies have accomplished the feat since). Harris managed 29 seasons, fourth most in MLB history. In his tenure as manager for five teams (with three terms for Washington and two for Detroit), Harris won over 2,150 games, three league pennants and two World Series championships (1924 with the Senators and 1947 with the New York Yankees); the gap between Harris's World Series appearances (22 years) and championships (23) are the longest in major league history.

== Early life ==
Stanley Raymond "Bucky" Harris was born on November 8, 1896, in Port Jervis, New York, and raised after the age of six in Pittston, Pennsylvania. He was of Swiss and Welsh descent. His father, Thomas, had emigrated from Wales, while his mother, Catherine (Rupp), hailed from Hughestown, near Pittston. His elder brother, Merle, was a minor league second baseman. Bucky Harris left school at age 13 to work at a local colliery, the Butler Mine, as an office boy and, later, a weigh master. In his spare time, Harris played basketball for the Pittston YMCA team as well as sandlot baseball.

== Professional career ==
=== Minor leagues ===
Harris was listed as 5 feet 9 inches (1.75 m) tall and 156 pounds (71 kg); he threw and batted right-handed. In 1916, when Harris was 19, Pittston native Hughie Jennings, then the manager of the Detroit Tigers, signed him to his first contract and farmed him to the Class B Muskegon Reds of the Central League, where he struggled as a batsman and was released. Harris then caught on with the Scranton Miners, Norfolk Tars and Reading Pretzels through 1917, before reaching the highest level of minor league baseball with the 1918–1919 Buffalo Bisons of the International League. Harris improved his batting skills during the latter season with the Bisons, making 126 hits and raising his average to .282.

=== Washington Senators (1919–1928; player–manager after 1924) ===
Harris then was recommended to the Washington Senators by baseball promoter Joe Engel, who led the Chattanooga Lookouts at Engel Stadium. In August 1919, at the age of 22, he came up to Washington but was unimpressive at first, batting a meager .214 and getting into only eight games that first season. Despite this poor showing, owner-manager Clark Griffith made him Washington's regular second baseman in 1920, and before long Harris was batting .300 and making a mark for himself as a tough competitor, standing up to even ferocious superstar Ty Cobb, who threatened Harris when he tagged Cobb in their first encounter.

Harris spent most of his playing career as a second baseman with the Senators (1919–1928). In 1924, he was named player-manager; at the age of 27 he was the youngest manager in the Majors. He proceeded to lead the Senators to their only World Series title in Washington in his rookie season, and was nicknamed "the Boy Wonder." He won a second consecutive American League pennant in 1925, but the Senators lost the 1925 World Series in Pittsburgh in the late innings of Game 7 after leading 3–1 in the Series. Baseball historian William C. Kashatus wrote of his dominant play in the 1924 World Series: "Not only did he set records for chances accepted, double plays and put-outs in the exciting seven-game affair, but he batted .333 and hit two home runs" — including an important roundtripper in Game 7 which opened the scoring and gave Washington a 1–0 lead in the 4th inning. These feats are even more impressive considering that the light-hitting Harris only hit nine home runs during his entire career.

After Harris‘ back-to-back pennants in 1924–1925, he was able to keep the Senators in the first division for the next three seasons, but their win totals declined, from 96 (1925) to 81 (1926), then 85 (1927).

=== Detroit Tigers (1929–1933) ===
When, in 1928, they won only 75 games (against 79 losses), Griffith traded Harris to Detroit and changed managers, with Hall of Fame pitcher Walter Johnson named as his successor. The 1928 Tigers had won only 68 games, and Harris' 1929 edition offered only a slight improvement, winning 70. Harris’ initial departure from the Senators in 1928 (he would twice return to manage them again from 1935 to 1942 and 1950–1954) came in a trade to the Tigers as player-manager. Although he retired as a player after the 1931 season, his playing career effectively ended with his trade to Detroit. Harris only made 11 cameo appearances in the Tiger lineup: seven in 1929 and four in 1931. In all, he appeared in 1,263 games over all or portions of 13 seasons, and collected 1,297 hits, with 224 doubles, 64 triples, nine home runs, 472 bases on balls, and 167 stolen bases. Harris batted .274 lifetime with 508 career runs batted in.

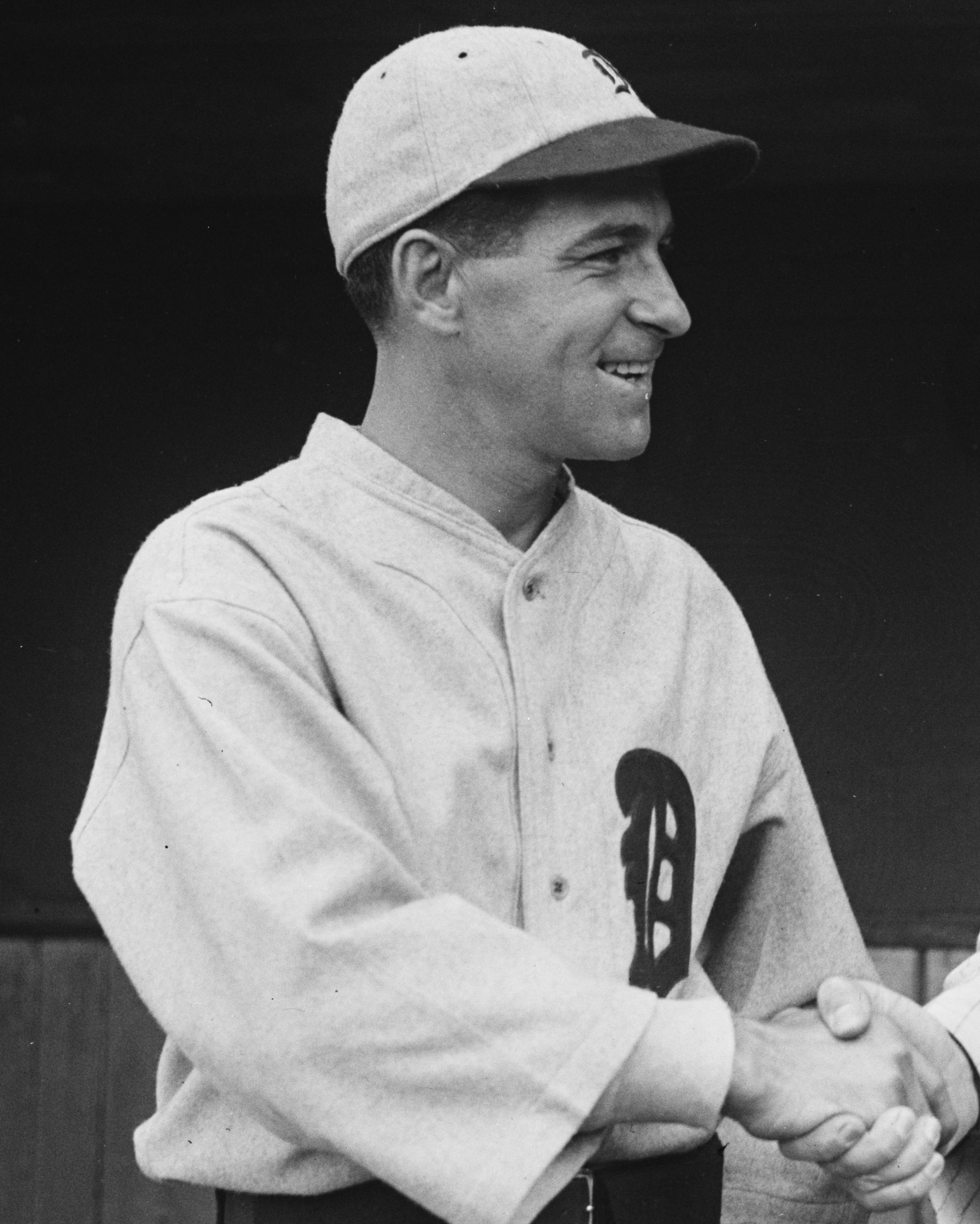
Bucky Harris in 1929

In five full seasons as the Tigers' manager, he produced only one winning year, 1932, when Detroit went 76–75 and finished fifth and 29 1/2 games behind the Yankees. In the waning days of 1933, Harris stepped down. His eventual successor, Mickey Cochrane, a future Hall-of-Fame catcher who was acquired from the Philadelphia Athletics, would lead the Tigers as a player-manager to back-to-back pennants in 1934–1935 (and their first-ever world championship in the latter year).

=== Boston Red Sox (1934) ===
Harris signed as manager of the Red Sox for 1934. Boston was then a habitual tail-ender in the American League, and had registered 15 consecutive losing seasons since its 1918 world championship. The 1933 Red Sox had won only 63 games and finished seventh in the eight-team AL under Marty McManus, but their wealthy new owner, Tom Yawkey, had begun a major rebuilding of both the ball club and Fenway Park. Yawkey jettisoned McManus and personally selected Harris as his new manager, and his 1934 Red Sox, despite an injury-riddled season by newly purchased ace left-handed pitcher Lefty Grove, broke the losing-season streak, finishing at .500 (76–76). But Harris's stay in the Boston dugout lasted only one season. He and Eddie Collins, the Red Sox' general manager, had feuded since their playing days and Yawkey may have hired Harris without consulting Collins. When Joe Cronin, the hard-hitting, 28-year-old playing manager of the Senators, became available on the trade market, Yawkey and Collins moved quickly, sending shortstop Lyn Lary and $225,000 to Washington on October 26, 1934, for Cronin, and then naming him manager for 1935. Harris then took Cronin's old job, returning to Clark Griffith and the Senators.

=== Second stint with Washington Senators (1935–1942) ===
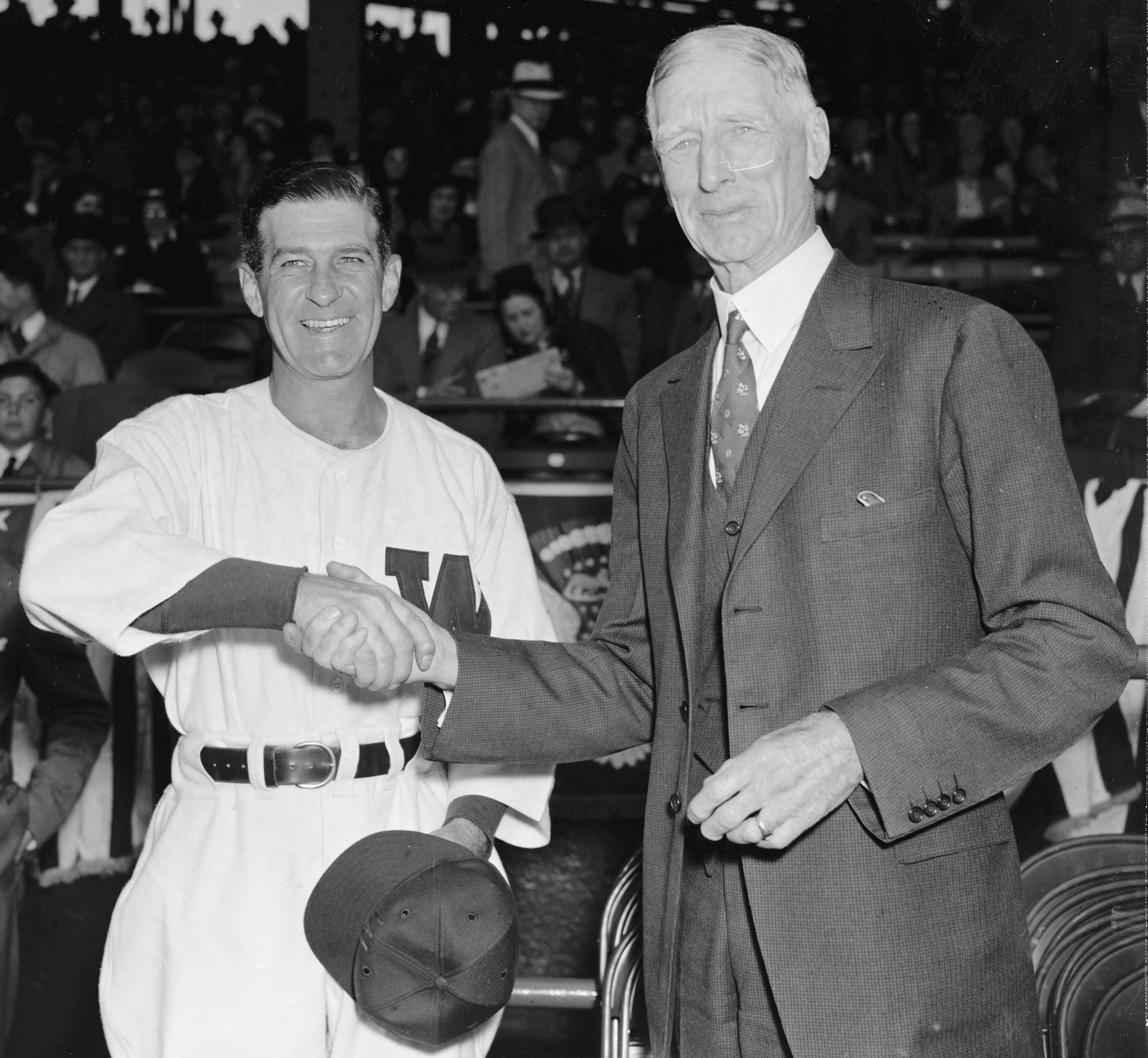
Harris and Connie Mack shaking hands in 1938

Harris' second term in Washington lasted for eight seasons (1935–1942), his longest tenure as a skipper. However, he never approached the highs of 1924 or 1925. Only one of his teams, the 1936 Senators, had a winning record (82–71) and first-division finish. Harris kept the club out of the American League basement, but three consecutive seventh-place finishes from 1940 to 1942 led to his departure.

=== Philadelphia Phillies (1943) ===
His only season in the National League was spent as skipper of the 1943 Phillies.

Perhaps the worst team (42–109, .278) in baseball in 1942, the Phillies had just been sold to lumberman William D. Cox. Under Harris, the 1943 edition improved to play .424 baseball (39–53) by July 27, with just three fewer victories than they had in all of 1942. However, Harris chafed at Cox' constant interference. When Harris protested, Cox abruptly fired him after only 92 games.

Harris then played a role in Cox' banishment from professional baseball for betting on games. On the day after his firing, Harris dropped a bombshell at his hotel room — he had evidence that Cox was betting on baseball. Harris's friends, outraged at his firing, informed Commissioner of Baseball Kenesaw Mountain Landis that Cox was violating baseball's anti-gambling mandate. Landis then summoned Harris to his office to testify in person about Cox' behavior. The owner was suspended indefinitely three months later and banned from baseball outright soon afterward. The Phillies were sold to R. R. M. Carpenter in November 1943.

=== New York Yankees (1947–1948) ===
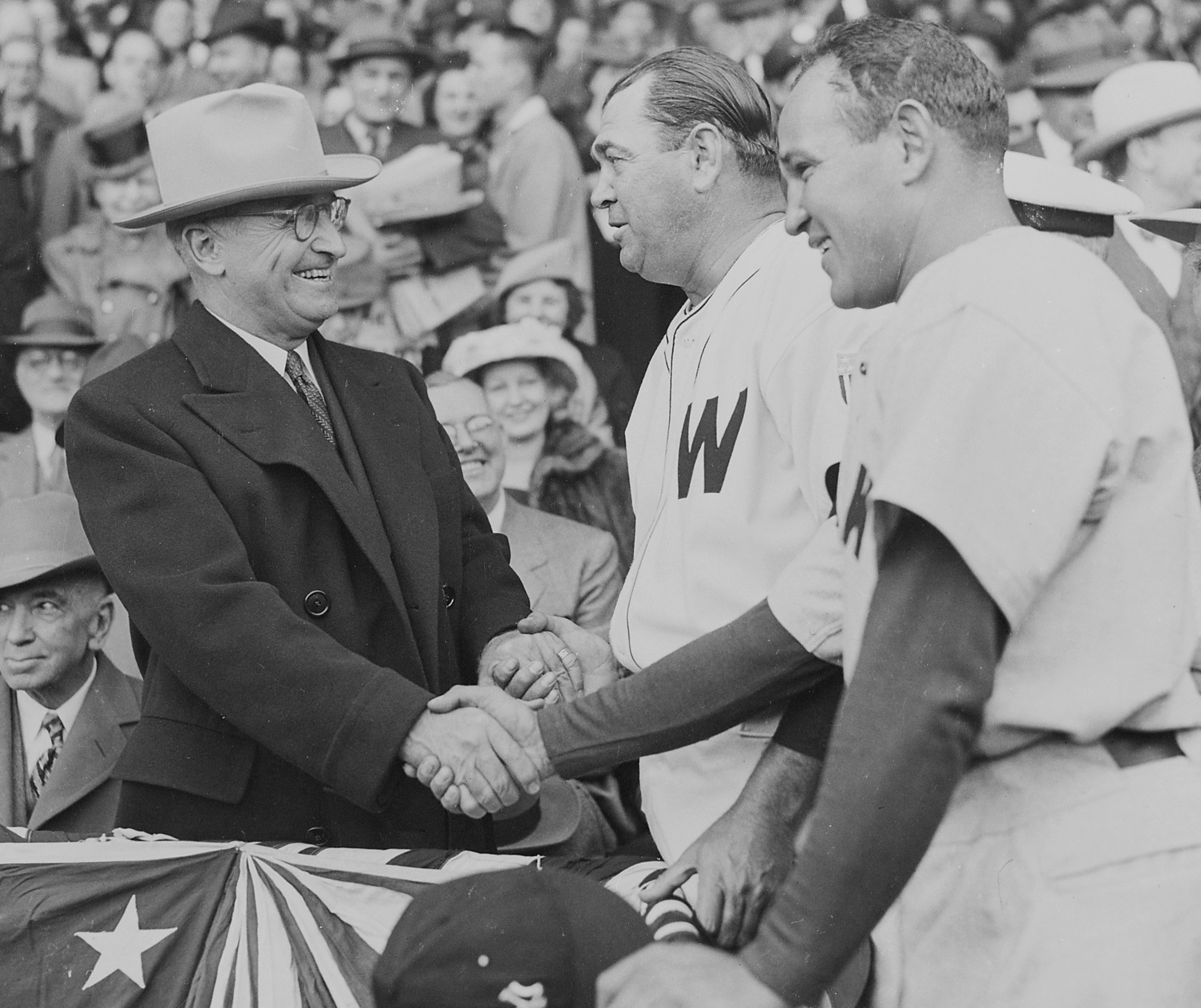
United States President Harry Truman (left) shaking hands with Washington Senators manager Ossie Bluege (center) and New York Yankees manager Bucky Harris (right) on April 18, 1947.

Harris then spent three seasons out of the big leagues, serving as general manager (1944–1946) and field manager (1944–1945) of the Buffalo Bisons, his old team in the International League. In August 1946, the Yankees' co-owner and GM, Larry MacPhail, appointed Harris to a front-office position.

The tumultuous 1946 season saw MacPhail employ three managers — Joe McCarthy, Bill Dickey and Johnny Neun — and finish third, 17 games in arrears of the pennant-winning Red Sox. At the close of the season, MacPhail named Harris the Bombers' 1947 manager, and he led them to his third American League pennant — the Yankees' 15th league title.

Behind Most Valuable Player Joe DiMaggio and newly acquired starting pitcher Allie Reynolds, the 1947 Yanks won 97 games and prevailed over the Tigers by a 12-game margin. Then they won Harris's second World Series championship, defeating the Jackie Robinson-led Brooklyn Dodgers in a thrilling, seven-game Fall Classic.

MacPhail sold his stake in the Yankees and left baseball immediately after the 1947 Series and Harris returned for a second season as manager. His 1948 Yankees won 94 games to finish a close third in a hectic pennant race, two games behind the Cleveland Indians and Red Sox, who ended the regular season in a tie for first place. But the result dissatisfied the Yankees' post-MacPhail ownership team, Dan Topping and Del Webb, and their new general manager, George Weiss, and they replaced Harris with Casey Stengel. Stengel would lead New York to ten American League pennants and seven World Series titles in the next 12 seasons.

=== Third stint with Washington Senators (1950–1954) ===
Harris returned to the minor leagues in 1949 as manager of the San Diego Padres of the Pacific Coast League, before launching his third stint as skipper of the Senators, coming off a 104-loss 1949 season. His first campaign, 1950, saw a 17-game improvement for Washington, then he led the Senators to a winning (78–76) mark in 1952, but the team could not escape the second division in Harris's five-year, final term as Washington's manager.

=== Detroit Tigers (1955–1956) ===
Nevertheless, the Tigers chose Harris to replace Fred Hutchinson as their manager for 1955, and in the first season of his second term in Detroit, Harris again produced a turnaround. The 1955 Tigers won 79 games (eleven more than 1954's edition) and had their first above-.500 season since 1950. Pitcher Ned Garver described Harris as "sympathetic," recalling that he would wait until an inning was over before replacing a pitcher on the mound. Then, Detroit won 82 games in 1956. But the Tigers finished fifth each season, and were experiencing turmoil in their front office; outspoken owner Walter Briggs Jr. was harshly critical of Harris and his coaches during the season and was in the process of selling the team. Fired by new owner Fred Knorr, Harris closed out his 29-year MLB managing career with a win–loss record of 2,158–2,219 (.493). As of September 2019, Harris ranked seventh in MLB manager career wins.

=== Managerial record ===
Team	Year	Regular season					Postseason			
Team	Year	Games	Won	Lost	Win %	Finish	Won	Lost	Win %	Result
WSH	1924	154	92	62	.597	1st in AL	4	3	.571	Won World Series (NYG)
WSH	1925	151	96	55	.636	1st in AL	3	4	.429	Lost World Series (PIT)
WSH	1926	150	81	69	.540	4th in AL	–	–	–	–
WSH	1927	154	85	69	.552	3rd in AL	–	–	–	–
WSH	1928	154	75	79	.487	4th in AL	–	–	–	–
DET	1929	154	70	84	.455	6th in AL	–	–	–	–
DET	1930	154	75	79	.487	5th in AL	–	–	–	–
DET	1931	154	61	93	.396	7th in AL	–	–	–	–
DET	1932	151	76	75	.503	5th in AL	–	–	–	–
DET	1933	152	73	79	.480	resigned	–	–	–	–
BOS	1934	152	76	76	.500	4th in AL	–	–	–	–
BOS total		152	76	76	.500		0	0	–	
WSH	1935	153	67	86	.438	6th in AL	–	–	–	–
WSH	1936	153	82	71	.536	4th in AL	–	–	–	–
WSH	1937	153	73	80	.477	6th in AL	–	–	–	–
WSH	1938	151	75	76	.497	5th in AL	–	–	–	–
WSH	1939	152	65	87	.428	6th in AL	–	–	–	–
WSH	1940	154	64	90	.416	7th in AL	–	–	–	–
WSH	1941	154	70	84	.455	6th in AL	–	–	–	–
WSH	1942	151	62	89	.411	7th in AL	–	–	–	–
PHI	1943	92	39	53	.424	fired	–	–	–	–
PHI total		92	39	53	.424		0	0	–	
NYY	1947	154	97	57	.630	1st in AL	4	3	.571	Won World Series (BKN)
NYY	1948	154	94	60	.610	3rd in AL	–	–	–	–
NYY total		308	191	117	.620		4	3	.571	
WSH	1950	154	67	87	.435	5th in AL	–	–	–	–
WSH	1951	154	62	92	.403	7th in AL	–	–	–	–
WSH	1952	154	78	76	.506	5th in AL	–	–	–	–
WSH	1953	152	76	76	.500	5th in AL	–	–	–	–
WSH	1954	154	66	88	.429	6th in AL	–	–	–	–
WSH total		2752	1336	1416	.500		7	7	.500	
DET	1955	154	79	75	.513	5th in AL	–	–	–	–
DET	1956	154	82	72	.532	5th in AL	–	–	–	–
DET total		1073	516	557	.481		0	0	–	
Total		4377	2158	2219	–		11	10	.524	

== Front office career ==
In 1957, at 60, Harris rejoined the Red Sox in a front office capacity. He was assistant general manager to Joe Cronin for two seasons, and then, when Cronin was named president of the American League, succeeded him as GM in January 1959, 24 years after Cronin had displaced Harris as Boston's field manager. Harris served for two losing seasons as general manager of the Red Sox before his firing in late September 1960. On his watch, the Red Sox finally broke the baseball color line by promoting Pumpsie Green from Triple-A on July 21, 1959, more than a dozen years after Robinson's debut with the Dodgers. They were the last of the 16 pre-expansion teams to integrate.

But the Red Sox went 75–79 in 1959 and fell into the second division, beginning a streak of eight straight losing seasons. Then, in 1960, Hall of Famer Ted Williams's final season, they won only 65 games and finished seventh in the eight-team league. Rightfielder Jackie Jensen, still productive at age 33 — he had been 1958's American League MVP and the AL's 1959 runs batted in leader — sat out the entire 1960 campaign in retirement due to his fear of flying.

Harris made a flurry of minor trades in an attempt to shake up his faltering team. His two highest-profile transactions, which occurred during the 1959–1960 offseason, saw him send left-handed pitcher and former bonus baby Frank Baumann to the Chicago White Sox and veteran starting catcher Sammy White to the Indians. But Baumann led the AL in earned run average with the 1960 Chisox (while the player Harris obtained, first baseman Ron Jackson, struggled through only ten games with Boston before being traded away again) and White abruptly retired rather than report to Cleveland, canceling his trade. Harris also ran afoul of Yawkey when he fired Yawkey associate Pinky Higgins as manager and replaced him with Billy Jurges, a Senators' coach, on July 3, 1959, without consulting the owner. Jurges lasted less than a calendar year as the Red Sox' pilot before his firing in June 1960 — and replacement by Higgins. Harris's dismissal followed not quite four months later.

Harris ended his long MLB career as a scout for the White Sox (1961–1962) and special assistant for the new expansion Washington Senators franchise that played in D.C. from 1961 to 1971 before moving on to Arlington, Texas. All told, he spent over 55 years in baseball. He died in Bethesda, Maryland, on his 81st birthday. According to his obituary in the November 10, 1977 Washington Post, Harris died after a long battle with Parkinson's disease. He was buried at St. Peter's Lutheran Church in Hughestown.

== Personal life ==
Harris's father-in-law during his first marriage, which ended in divorce in 1951, was Howard Sutherland, former United States Senator from West Virginia.

== See also ==
- List of Major League Baseball career stolen bases leaders
- List of Major League Baseball player-managers
- List of Major League Baseball managerial wins and winning percentage leaders

Sporting positions
Preceded by Greg Mulleavy	Buffalo Bisons manager 1944–1945	Succeeded by Gabby Hartnett
Preceded by Jim Brillheart	San Diego Padres (PCL) manager 1949	Succeeded by Del Baker
