= Bruce Barmes =

American baseball player (1929–2014)

- Pinch hitter / Right fielder
- Born: October 23, 1929; Vincennes, Indiana, U.S.
- Died: January 25, 2014 (aged 84); Garner, North Carolina, U.S.
- Batted: Left Threw: Right

MLB debut
- September 13, 1953, for the Washington Senators

Last MLB appearance
- September 27, 1953, for the Washington Senators

MLB statistics
- Batting average: .200
- Home runs: 0
- Runs batted in: 0
- Stats at Baseball Reference

Teams
- Washington Senators (1953)

Bruce Raymond Barmes (October 23, 1929 – January 25, 2014), nicknamed "Squeaky", was an American professional baseball player.

An outfielder, Barmes had an outstanding minor league career, notching a .318 career batting average and 1,627 hits in 1,439 games played over eleven full seasons (1950–60). He made All-Star teams in the Florida State League in 1950 and the Tri-State League in 1952, when he won the batting title with the Charlotte Hornets, and he helped his teams win league championships in his first three seasons of professional baseball. However, his major league career was simply a Cup of coffee during a late September call-up with the 1953 Washington Senators.

Barmes batted left-handed, threw right-handed, stood 5 feet 8 inches (1.73 m) tall and weighed 165 pounds (75 kg). His MLB debut came when he replaced Jackie Jensen as Washington's right fielder in the first game of a doubleheader at Griffith Stadium against the Detroit Tigers on September 13. He handled two chances in the field without an error and grounded out to second baseman Fred Hatfield against Ned Garver in his only at bat. Barmes' other four MLB appearances came as a pinch hitter. He earned his only MLB hit with a pinch single off Bob Trice of the Philadelphia Athletics on September 26.

Bruce Barmes was the uncle of MLB infielder Clint Barmes.
