= Jerry Lane =

American baseball player (1926–1988)

- Pitcher
- Born: February 7, 1926; Ashland, New York, U.S.
- Died: July 24, 1988 (aged 62); Chattanooga, Tennessee, U.S.
- Batted: Right Threw: Right

MLB debut
- July 7, 1953, for the Washington Senators

Last MLB appearance
- May 8, 1955, for the Cincinnati Redlegs

MLB statistics
- Win–loss record: 2–6
- Earned run average: 4.48
- Strikeouts: 33
- Stats at Baseball Reference

Teams
- Washington Senators (1953); Cincinnati Redlegs (1954–1955)

Jerald Hal Lane (February 7, 1926 – July 24, 1988) was an American professional baseball player. He was a right-handed pitcher who appeared in 32 games in Major League Baseball for the Washington Senators (1953) and the Cincinnati Redlegs (1954–1955), in addition to 429 games over 12 seasons (1948–1959) in the minor leagues. The native of Ashland, New York, stood 6 feet (1.8 m) tall and weighed 205 pounds (93 kg).

Lane graduated from Ithaca College in 1953. He did not play college baseball for the Ithaca Bombers but only attended classes during the baseball offseasons.

Lane signed initially with the Boston Braves in 1948, but after two years of Class D ball he was acquired by Washington. Recalled from the Double-A Chattanooga Lookouts in the middle of the 1953 season, Lane made his Major League debut at Griffith Stadium against the Boston Red Sox on July 7 as a starting pitcher, but lost a low-scoring duel to Hal Brown, giving up only one run in eight innings of work. He started only one other game all season — on September 13 — and again lasted eight innings in a losing effort (this time against the Detroit Tigers). As a rookie, Lane compiled a 1–4 record in 20 games and 56 2/3 innings, with an earned run average of 4.92. His lone victory, however, came against the eventual 1953 world champion New York Yankees in relief on August 18.

Sent back to Chattanooga for 1954, Lane posted a 13–8 record with a 2.97 ERA in 31 games and was purchased by the Redlegs on August 7. He made his National League debut September 7 as a relief pitcher and held the St. Louis Cardinals scoreless over two innings. Five days later, he relieved Fred Baczewski in the first inning of a game against the Pittsburgh Pirates with Cincinnati already leading, 3–0. He worked the next 7 1/3 frames to earn the win in a 13–2 Redleg victory, which would represent his last MLB win and his only Senior Circuit triumph.

Lane appeared in three games for Cincinnati in 1954 and eight more in relief at the outset of 1955 before returning to the minor leagues for the remainder of his career. In the Majors, he allowed 84 hits and 25 bases on balls in 78 1/3 innings of work. As a minor leaguer, he posted a 114–118 mark before leaving the game.
