= Al Sima =

American baseball player (1921–1993)

- Pitcher
- Born: October 7, 1921; Mahwah, New Jersey, U.S.
- Died: August 17, 1993 (aged 71); Suffern, New York, U.S.
- Batted: Right Threw: Left

MLB debut
- July 28, 1950, for the Washington Senators

Last MLB appearance
- September 19, 1954, for the Philadelphia Athletics

MLB statistics
- Win–loss record: 11–21
- Earned run average: 4.61
- Strikeouts: 111
- Stats at Baseball Reference

Teams
- Washington Senators (1950–1951, 1953); Chicago White Sox (1954); Philadelphia Athletics (1954)

Albert Sima (October 7, 1921 – August 17, 1993) was an American professional baseball pitcher.

He appeared in exactly 100 Major League Baseball (MLB) games over four seasons with the Washington Senators (1950–1951; 1953), Chicago White Sox (1954), and Philadelphia Athletics (1954).

On September 19, 1954, Sima was the last pitcher to take the mound for his Philadelphia Athletics in the final home game in their 54-year franchise history in Philadelphia, hurling a scoreless ninth inning at Connie Mack Stadium, which was previously named Shibe Park. It was also Sima's last game in the Major Leagues.

Of Sima's 100 appearances, 30 came as a starting pitcher. In 308 2/3 innings pitched, he allowed 343 hits, 158 earned runs and 132 bases on balls. He recorded 111 strikeouts, four complete games and four saves, winning 11 of 32 decisions and compiling an earned run average of 4.61.

Sima's professional career extended over 16 seasons, being interrupted in 1944–1945 by service in the United States Navy during World War II.

Most of his career was spent in minor league baseball in the organizations of the Senators and New York Giants, playing for eight seasons as a member of Washington's Double-A affiliate, the Chattanooga Lookouts of the Southern Association.

He retired in 1959.
