= Dan Porter =

American baseball player (1931-2017)

- Outfielder
- Born: October 17, 1931; Decatur, Illinois, U.S.
- Died: January 7, 2017 (aged 85); Decatur, Illinois, U.S.
- Batted: Left Threw: Left

MLB debut
- August 16, 1951, for the Washington Senators

Last MLB appearance
- September 30, 1951, for the Washington Senators

MLB statistics
- Games played: 13
- At bats: 19
- Hits: 4
- Stats at Baseball Reference

Teams
- Washington Senators (1951)

Daniel Edward Porter (October 17, 1931 – January 7, 2017) was an American outfielder in Major League Baseball. He played for the Washington Senators.
