= Charlie Shields (1900s pitcher) =

American baseball player (1879–1953)

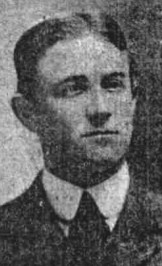
- Pitcher
- Born: December 10, 1879; Jackson, Tennessee, U.S.
- Died: August 27, 1953 (aged 73); Memphis, Tennessee, U.S.
- Batted: Left Threw: Left

MLB debut
- April 23, 1902, for the Baltimore Orioles

Last MLB appearance
- June 10, 1907, for the St. Louis Cardinals

MLB statistics
- Win–loss record: 7–13
- Earned run average: 4.27
- Strikeouts: 35
- Stats at Baseball Reference

Teams
- Baltimore Orioles (1902); St. Louis Browns (1902); St. Louis Cardinals (1907)

Charles Jessamine Shields (December 10, 1879 – August 27, 1953) was an American Major League Baseball (MLB) pitcher who played in 1902 and 1907 with the Baltimore Orioles, St. Louis Browns and the St. Louis Cardinals. He batted and threw left-handed.

He was born in Jackson, Tennessee, and died in Memphis, Tennessee.
