= Julio Moreno (baseball) =

Cuban baseball player (1921–1987)

- Pitcher
- Born: January 28, 1921; Güines, Cuba
- Died: January 2, 1987 (aged 65); Miami, Florida, U.S.
- Batted: Right Threw: Right

MLB debut
- September 8, 1950, for the Washington Senators

Last MLB appearance
- June 26, 1953, for the Washington Senators

MLB statistics
- Win–loss record: 18–22
- Earned run average: 4.25
- Strikeouts: 119
- Stats at Baseball Reference

Teams
- Washington Senators (1950–1953)

Julio Moreno González (January 28, 1921 – January 2, 1987) was a Cuban-born right-handed pitcher in North American professional baseball. Nicknamed "Jiquí" (after a hardwood tree) and "the Cuban Bob Feller" for his blazing fastball, Moreno was a star in Cuban amateur baseball circles before he turned professional in 1947 and his mound career would extend into 1966, when he was 45 years of age. Moreno appeared in 73 games played in Major League Baseball for the Washington Senators from 1950–1953. The native of Güines stood 5 feet 8 inches (1.73 m) tall and weighed 165 pounds (75 kg).

== Career ==
After joining professional baseball, Moreno was a star hurler for the Havana Cubanos of the Class B Florida International League, winning 50 of 66 decisions (.758) from 1947 to 1950, before being called up by the Senators for the final month of the 1950 campaign.

In his Major League debut on September 8, he started against the Philadelphia Athletics and pitched a complete game, 10–4 victory at Griffith Stadium. Moreno spent the full 1951 and 1952 seasons with Washington, as both a starter and relief pitcher, and was credited with 12 complete games and two saves during that period. He made his last MLB start on May 25, 1953 — also against Philadelphia — and threw another complete game victory over the Athletics, 6–1. Although Moreno had compiled a 3–1 record that season and his best MLB earned run average (2.80), he was sent to the minor leagues in mid-season and spent the rest of his career in minor and winter league baseball. At age 45, he worked in 38 games for the 1966 Puebla Pericos in the Double-A Mexican League. Two years later, as batting practice pitcher for the world champion Detroit Tigers, he was voted a full World Series share by his teammates.

As a Major Leaguer, Moreno surrendered 349 hits and 157 bases on balls, and recorded 119 strikeouts, in 336 2/3 innings pitched.
