= Frank Campos =

Cuban baseball player (1924-2006)

- Outfielder / Pinch hitter
- Born: May 11, 1924; Havana, Cuba
- Died: January 28, 2006 (aged 81); Miami, Florida, U.S.
- Batted: Left Threw: Left

MLB debut
- September 11, 1951, for the Washington Senators

Last MLB appearance
- May 17, 1953, for the Washington Senators

MLB statistics
- Batting average: .279
- Home runs: 0
- Runs batted in: 13
- Stats at Baseball Reference

Teams
- Washington Senators (1951–1953)

Francisco José Campos Lopéz (May 11, 1924 – January 28, 2006) was a Cuban-born professional baseball player, an outfielder who appeared in 71 games played over three Major League seasons with the Washington Senators between 1951–1953. He threw and batted left-handed, stood 5 feet 11 inches (1.80 m) tall and weighed 180 pounds (82 kg).

Born in Havana, Campos played in organized baseball for nine seasons (1944–1945; 1948–1954). He made his debut with Washington after winning the 1951 batting championship of the Class B Tri-State League, batting .368 with 177 hits. In his debut game for the Senators on September 11, 1951, Campos doubled in his first MLB at bat off Howie Judson of the Chicago White Sox. He continued his hot streak by racking up four multi-hit games in his next seven Major League appearances, and batted .423 with 11 hits in 26 at bats during his September trial.

Campos spent the entire 1952 campaign with Washington, appearing in 53 games. Although he played the outfield in 23 games during the season's early months, he appeared exclusively as a pinch hitter or pinch runner after July 22. Campos batted .259 in 112 at bats for the year. His Major League career concluded with ten more pinch hitting appearances during the early weeks of the 1953 season. All told, Campos made 41 hits in the Majors, including nine doubles and two triples.
