= Ed Haigh =

American baseball player (1867–1953)

- Outfielder
- Born: February 7, 1867; Philadelphia, Pennsylvania, U.S.
- Died: February 13, 1953 (aged 86); Atlantic City, New Jersey, U.S.
- Batted: Unknown Threw: Unknown

MLB debut
- August 14, 1892, for the St. Louis Browns

Last MLB appearance
- August 14, 1892, for the St. Louis Browns

MLB statistics
- Batting average: .250
- Home runs: 0
- Runs batted in: 0
- Stats at Baseball Reference

Teams
- St. Louis Browns (1892)

Edward E. Haigh (February 7, 1867 – February 13, 1953) was a 19th-century American Major League Baseball outfielder. He played for the St. Louis Browns of the National League in 1892.

Haigh made his big league debut on August 14, 1892. Louisville's Courier Journal reported that Haigh "accidentally made a hit and it was a regular comedy to see him on the bases ... It is doubtful if Haigh could steal a base if he was alone in a ten-acre field." His release was reported in the St. Louis Globe-Democrat on August 16: "Capt. Gore and Mr. Von der Ahe do not consider him a good enough player for the big League."
