= Frank Sacka =

American baseball player (1924-1994)

- Catcher
- Born: August 30, 1924; Romulus, Michigan, U.S.
- Died: December 7, 1994 (aged 70); Dearborn, Michigan, U.S.
- Batted: Right Threw: Right

MLB debut
- April 29, 1951, for the Washington Senators

Last MLB appearance
- September 13, 1953, for the Washington Senators

MLB statistics
- Batting average: .265
- Home runs: 0
- Runs batted in: 6
- Stats at Baseball Reference

Teams
- Washington Senators (1951; 1953)

Frank Sacka (August 30, 1924 – December 7, 1994) was an American professional baseball player. He appeared in 14 Major League games as a catcher and pinch hitter for the 1951 and 1953 editions of the Washington Senators, playing in seven games in each season. Sacka threw and batted right-handed, stood 6 feet (1.8 m) tall and weighed 195 pounds (88 kg).

Born in Romulus, Michigan, the same hometown of future MLB catcher and batting coach Charley Lau, Sacka joined the professional baseball ranks in 1946 and played through the 1956 season. After spending his first five pro years in the St. Louis Browns' and Cleveland Indians' farm systems, Sacka was selected by Washington in the Rule 5 draft after a stellar 1950 campaign with the Anderson Rebels of the Class B Tri-State League, in which Sacka batted .324 with 23 home runs and 124 runs batted in. In his MLB debut on April 29, 1951, Sacka went hitless in three at bats as the starting catcher in a game against Ed Lopat and the New York Yankees at Yankee Stadium. Eight days later, he enjoyed his best day in the Majors, collecting three singles in five at-bats with two runs batted in against his former organization, the Indians, helping Washington win, 11–10.

He stuck with the Senators through the end of May, then was optioned to the Double-A Chattanooga Lookouts, where he would spend most of the next five seasons. However, he was recalled to Washington in late July 1953 and appeared in seven more MLB games. He collected two hits in two of them, against the Browns (another former employer) and the Yankees. Altogether, Sacka collected nine hits, all singles, in 34 MLB at bats during his 14-game career.
