= Mickey Grasso =

American baseball player (1920–1975)

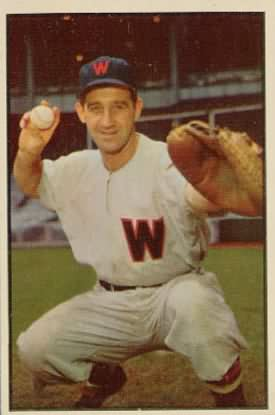
- Catcher
- Born: May 10, 1920; Newark, New Jersey, U.S.
- Died: October 15, 1975 (aged 55); Miami, Florida, U.S.
- Batted: Right Threw: Right

MLB debut
- September 18, 1946, for the New York Giants

Last MLB appearance
- May 8, 1955, for the New York Giants

MLB statistics
- Batting average: .226
- Home runs: 5
- Runs batted in: 87
- Stats at Baseball Reference

Teams
- New York Giants (1946); Washington Senators (1950–1953); Cleveland Indians (1954); New York Giants (1955)

Newton Michael Grasso (May 10, 1920 – October 15, 1975) was an American professional baseball catcher and veteran of World War II who, after over two years as a Prisoner of War of the Germans, played all or parts of seven seasons in Major League Baseball. He appeared in 322 total games for the New York Giants in 1946 and 1955, the Washington Senators from 1950 to 1953, and the Cleveland Indians in 1954. The Newark, New Jersey, native stood 6 feet (1.8 m) tall and weighed 190 pounds (86 kg); he batted and threw right-handed.

== Prisoner of War ==
Grasso had played only one season in the minor leagues when he enlisted in the United States Army in January 1942, six weeks after the Attack on Pearl Harbor. He rose to the rank of technical sergeant and was assigned to the 34th Infantry Division when he was taken prisoner in Tunisia in February 1943 during the North African Campaign. Grasso was eventually interned in a POW camp in Fürstenberg (Oder), 68 miles (109 km) southeast of Berlin. In the waning days of the war, in April 1945, as he was being marched westward by his captors, Grasso was one of ten allied prisoners who escaped German custody and the invading Soviet Red Army and was rescued by American troops.

== Baseball career ==
Although he had lost 60 pounds (27 kg) during his internment, Grasso was able to return to professional baseball in 1946 when he played 106 games at the Triple-A level before his recall by the New York Giants in September. He got into seven games, six as the Giants' starting catcher, but he had only three hits and was sent back to the minors for three full years.

Selected by the Washington Senators in the 1949 Rule 5 draft, Grasso then spent the next five seasons in the major leagues. He hit a career-high .287 in 1950 and was the Senators' regular catcher in 1952, when they posted their last winning season in Washington before moving in 1961 to Minneapolis–Saint Paul. After four seasons in Washington, Grasso was traded to the contending Cleveland Indians in January 1954, but a broken ankle sustained during spring training sidelined him until September 2. The 1954 Indians won 111 games and captured their third American League pennant. Grasso was able to play in the 1954 World Series (against his old team, the Giants). But his lone appearance, in Game 1 on September 29 at the Polo Grounds, lasted only one inning. Relieving regular catcher Jim Hegan in the tenth frame with the game tied 2–2, Grasso was behind the plate when Dusty Rhodes hit a walk-off, three-run homer off Indians' ace Bob Lemon. New York went on to sweep the series in four games.

During the off-season, Grasso was reacquired by the Giants, and finished his big-league tenure with them in limited service during the 1955 season's early weeks. His 216 career MLB hits included 23 doubles, one triple and five home runs, and he was credited with 87 runs batted in. He was one of eight former World War II Prisoners of War to appear in the major leagues. His 13-season professional career ended in 1958.

Grasso was known for his fiery temper and was one of the Senators' most popular players of the early 1950s. He was nicknamed "Mickey" because of his resemblance to the Baseball Hall of Fame catcher of the 1920s and 1930s, Mickey Cochrane.

He died of a heart attack in Miami, Florida, at the age of 55.
