= Harry Atkinson (baseball) =

American baseball player (1874–1953)

- Left fielder
- Born: January 19, 1874; Fulton, Missouri, U.S.
- Died: January 2, 1953 (aged 78); Mexico, Missouri, U.S.
- Batted: Unknown Threw: Unknown

MLB debut
- September 25, 1895, for the St. Louis Browns

Last MLB appearance
- September 25, 1895, for the St. Louis Browns

MLB statistics
- Games played: 1
- At bats: 5
- Hits: 2
- Stats at Baseball Reference

Teams
- St. Louis Browns (1895)

John Harry Atkinson (January 19, 1874 – January 2, 1953) was an American professional baseball player who played for the St. Louis Browns in 1895.

Atkinson was born in Fulton, Missouri and attended Westminster College.
