= Roy Hawes =

American baseball player

- First baseman
- Born: July 5, 1926; Shiloh, Illinois, U.S.
- Died: October 9, 2017 (aged 91); Ringgold, Georgia, U.S.
- Batted: Left Threw: Left

MLB debut
- September 23, 1951, for the Washington Senators

Last MLB appearance
- September 30, 1951, for the Washington Senators

MLB statistics
- Games played: 3
- At bats: 6
- Hits: 1
- Stats at Baseball Reference

Teams
- Washington Senators (1951)

Roy Lee Hawes (July 5, 1926 – October 9, 2017) was an American baseball player who had a 14-year professional career. A first baseman, he appeared in three Major League Baseball games for the Washington Senators in 1951. The Shiloh, Illinois, native threw and batted left-handed and was listed as 6 feet 2 inches (1.88 m) tall and 190 pounds (86 kg).

Hawes' MLB service came at the tail end of the 1951 campaign. In his debut, at Shibe Park on September 23, he was sent to the plate in the third inning as a pinch hitter for Connie Marrero and singled off Bob Hooper of the Philadelphia Athletics. He was then erased on a double play. Washington trailed 6–0 at the time, and lost the contest, 12–4. He appeared in two more games, including one start at first base on September 30, and went hitless in his next five at bats. Hawes played over 1,700 games during his minor-league career, which included six full seasons for the Double-A Chattanooga Lookouts. He retired after the 1960 season. Hawes died at the age of 91 on October 9, 2017, in Ringgold, Georgia.
