= 1953 in baseball =

The following are the baseball events of the year 1953 throughout the world.

== Champions ==
=== Major League Baseball ===
- World Series: New York Yankees over Brooklyn Dodgers (4–2)
- All-Star Game, July 14 at Crosley Field: National League, 5–1

=== Other champions ===
- All-American Girls Professional Baseball League: Grand Rapids Chicks
- College World Series: Michigan
- Japan Series: Yomiuri Giants over Nankai Hawks (4–2)
- Little League World Series: Southside, Birmingham, Alabama

Winter Leagues

- 1953 Caribbean Series: Cangrejeros de Santurce
- Cuban League: Leones del Habana
- Dominican Republic League: Águilas Cibaeñas
- Mexican Pacific League: Venados de Mazatlán
- Panamanian League: Chesterfield Smokers
- Puerto Rican League: Cangrejeros de Santurce
- Venezuelan League: Leones del Caracas

== Awards and honors ==
- Baseball Hall of Fame
  - Ed Barrow
  - Chief Bender
  - Tom Connolly
  - Dizzy Dean
  - Bill Klem
  - Al Simmons
  - Bobby Wallace
  - Harry Wright
- MLB Most Valuable Player Award
  - Roy Campanella (BRO, National)
  - Al Rosen (CLE, American) (unanimous)
- MLB Rookie of the Year Award
  - Jim Gilliam (BRO, National)
  - Harvey Kuenn (DET, American)
- The Sporting News Player of the Year Award
  - Al Rosen (CLE)
- The Sporting News Pitcher of the Year Award
  - Warren Spahn (MIL, National)
  - Bob Porterfield (WSH, American)
- The Sporting News Rookie of the Year Award
  - Jim Gilliam (BRO, National)
  - Harvey Kuenn (DET, American)
- The Sporting News Manager of the Year Award
  - Casey Stengel (NYY)

== Statistical leaders ==
	American League		National League	
Stat	Player	Total	Player	Total
AVG	Mickey Vernon (WSH)	.337	Carl Furillo (BRO)	.344
HR	Al Rosen (CLE)	43	Eddie Mathews (MIL)	47
RBI	Al Rosen (CLE)	145	Roy Campanella (BRO)	142
W	Bob Porterfield (WSH)	22	Robin Roberts (PHI); Warren Spahn (MIL)	23
ERA	Eddie Lopat (NYY)	2.42	Warren Spahn (MIL)	2.10
K	Billy Pierce (CWS)	186	Robin Roberts (PHI)	198

== Major league baseball final standings ==
=== American League final standings ===
American League
Team	W	L	Pct.	GB	Home	Road
New York Yankees	99	52	.656	—	50‍–‍27	49‍–‍25
Cleveland Indians	92	62	.597	8½	53‍–‍24	39‍–‍38
Chicago White Sox	89	65	.578	11½	41‍–‍36	48‍–‍29
Boston Red Sox	84	69	.549	16	38‍–‍38	46‍–‍31
Washington Senators	76	76	.500	23½	39‍–‍36	37‍–‍40
Detroit Tigers	60	94	.390	40½	30‍–‍47	30‍–‍47
Philadelphia Athletics	59	95	.383	41½	27‍–‍50	32‍–‍45
St. Louis Browns	54	100	.351	46½	23‍–‍54	31‍–‍46

Locations of teams for the 1942–1953 American League seasons
American League

=== National League final standings ===
National League
Team	W	L	Pct.	GB	Home	Road
Brooklyn Dodgers	105	49	.682	—	60‍–‍17	45‍–‍32
Milwaukee Braves	92	62	.597	13	45‍–‍31	47‍–‍31
Philadelphia Phillies	83	71	.539	22	48‍–‍29	35‍–‍42
St. Louis Cardinals	83	71	.539	22	48‍–‍30	35‍–‍41
New York Giants	70	84	.455	35	38‍–‍39	32‍–‍45
Cincinnati Redlegs	68	86	.442	37	38‍–‍39	30‍–‍47
Chicago Cubs	65	89	.422	40	43‍–‍34	22‍–‍55
Pittsburgh Pirates	50	104	.325	55	26‍–‍51	24‍–‍53

Locations of teams for the 1953–1957 National League seasons
National League

== All-American Girls Professional Baseball League final standings ==
Rank	Team	W	L	Pct.	GB
1	Fort Wayne Daisies	66	39	.629	—
2	Grand Rapids Chicks	62	44	.585	4½
3	Kalamazoo Lassies	56	50	.528	10½
4	Rockford Peaches	51	55	.481	15½
5	South Bend Blue Sox	44	62	.415	22½
6	Muskegon Belles	38	67	.362	28

== Nippon Professional Baseball final standings ==
=== Central League final standings ===
Central League	G	W	L	T	Pct.	GB
Yomiuri Giants	125	87	37	1	.702	—
Osaka Tigers	130	74	56	0	.569	16.0
Chunichi Dragons	130	70	57	3	.551	18.5
Hiroshima Carp	130	53	75	2	.414	36.0
Taiyo Shochiku Robins	130	52	77	1	.403	37.5
Kokutetsu Swallows	125	45	79	1	.363	42.0

=== Pacific League final standings ===
Pacific League	G	W	L	T	Pct.	GB
Nankai Hawks	120	71	48	1	.597	—
Hankyu Braves	120	67	52	1	.563	4.0
Daiei Stars	120	63	53	4	.543	6.5
Nishitetsu Lions	120	57	61	2	.483	13.5
Mainichi Orions	120	56	62	2	.475	14.5
Tokyu Flyers	120	50	67	3	.427	20.0
Kintetsu Pearls	120	48	69	3	.410	22.0

== Events ==
=== January ===
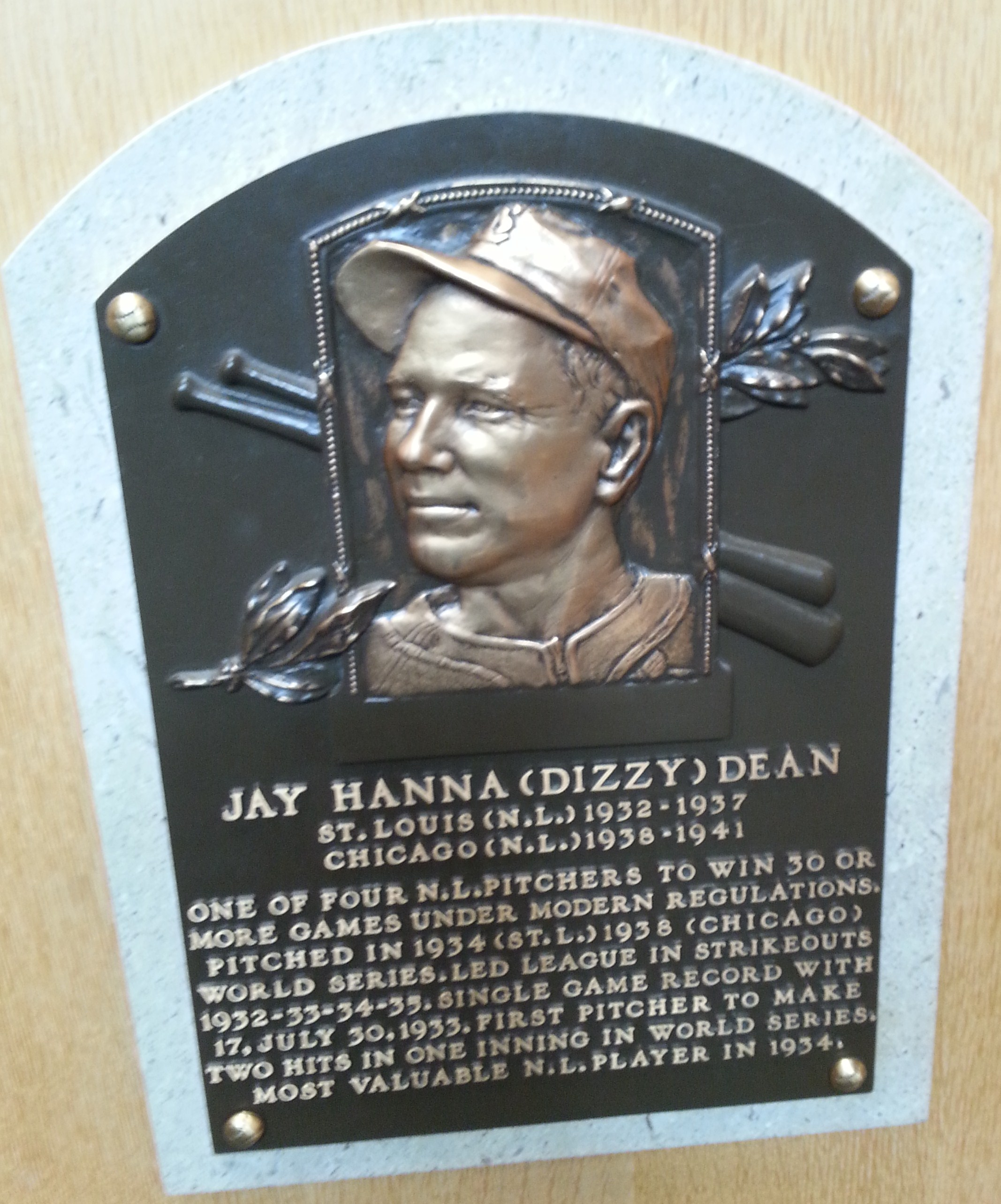
Dizzy Dean's Hall-of-Fame plaque

- January 17 – The Brooklyn Dodgers trade veteran outfielder Andy Pafko to the Boston Braves for infielder Roy Hartsfield and $50,000. Two months from now, Wisconsin-native Pafko will find himself playing in his home state when Boston's National League franchise abruptly transfers to Milwaukee during spring training.
- January 21 – Former St. Louis Cardinals pitcher Dizzy Dean and Philadelphia Athletics slugger Al Simmons are elected to the Baseball Hall of Fame.
- January 27 – The Chicago White Sox acquire the reigning, two-time American League batting champion, first baseman Ferris Fain, from the Philadelphia Athletics in a five-player trade. Chicago also receives a minor-league infielder and sends first baseman Eddie Robinson, shortstop Joe DeMaestri and outfielder Ed McGhee to Philadelphia in the deal.
- January 28 – St. Louis Cardinals owner Fred Saigh pleads no contest to two charges of income tax evasion in a U.S. federal court, and is sentenced to 15 months in prison. The penalty forces Saigh to put the Cardinals up for sale, and triggers fears that an out-of-town buyer could move the franchise out of St. Louis.
- January 29 – The Philadelphia Athletics and Detroit Tigers exchange veteran utility infielders, with Billy Hitchcock, 36, going to Detroit for Don Kolloway, 34.

=== February ===
- February 9 – The Boston Red Sox trade shortstop/third baseman Vern Stephens, 32, an eight-time All-Star and 3x AL runs batted in champion, to the Chicago White Sox for pitchers Hal Brown, Marv Grissom and Bill Kennedy. Stephens, Ted Williams and Bobby Doerr had formed a formidable slugging trio for the Bosox' late-1940s contending teams.
- February 13 – The Philadelphia Athletics' home field, known as Shibe Park since its 1909 opening, is renamed Connie Mack Stadium in honor of the team's 90-year-old, legendary and longtime (1901–1950) former manager.
- February 16:
  - Future Baseball Hall of Fame hitter Ted Williams, flying combat missions as a U.S. Marine Corps pilot during the Korean War, survives the crash-landing of his F9F Panther fighter jet at Suwon airfield after it is hobbled by enemy anti-aircraft fire. The jet is "trailing smoke and a 30-foot ribbon of fire" as Williams brings it in on its belly; he escapes with minor injuries.
  - A complicated four-team, five-player trade occurs in the National League involving the Boston Braves, Brooklyn Dodgers, Cincinnati Reds and Philadelphia Phillies. When the dust settles, the Braves acquire first baseman Joe Adcock from the Reds and outfielder Jim Pendleton from the Dodgers, Brooklyn obtains pitcher Russ Meyer from the Phillies, the Reds get infielder Rocky Bridges from the Dodgers, and the Phillies receive first baseman Earl Torgeson from Boston. Cash payments also figure in the transaction.
- February 20 – Brewing giant Anheuser-Busch and its president, August A. Busch Jr., purchase the St. Louis Cardinals franchise from Fred Saigh for $3.75 million, removing all concerns that the team will move elsewhere. Rumors had abounded that a group from Houston were bidding on the club with the intention of transferring it to that Texas city. The Busch ownership will last until the start of 1996, and witness six NL pennants and three World Series championships.

=== March ===
- March 13 – Boston Braves owner Lou Perini announces he is moving the team to Milwaukee, site of the Braves' top farm club, in time for the 1953 season. The move ends the club's presence in Boston after 82 consecutive years, predating the formation of the National League, of which it is a charter member; it began in 1871 as a member of the old National Association of Professional Base Ball Players. The franchise transfer is the NL's first of the 20th century, and MLB's first since 1903—but nine more will follow over the next two decades.
- March 19 – The Pittsburgh Pirates sign twin brothers Eddie and Johnny O'Brien, 22, former baseball and basketball stars at Seattle University, to bonus contracts as amateur free agents. The first twins to play on the same MLB team in 38 years, on June 7, they will start at shortstop and second base and become Pittsburgh's primary double-play combination for the 1953 season.
- March 26 – The St. Louis Browns return minor-league southpaw Tommy Lasorda to the Brooklyn Dodgers' organization. Lasorda's contract had been sold to the Browns on a conditional basis on February 21.

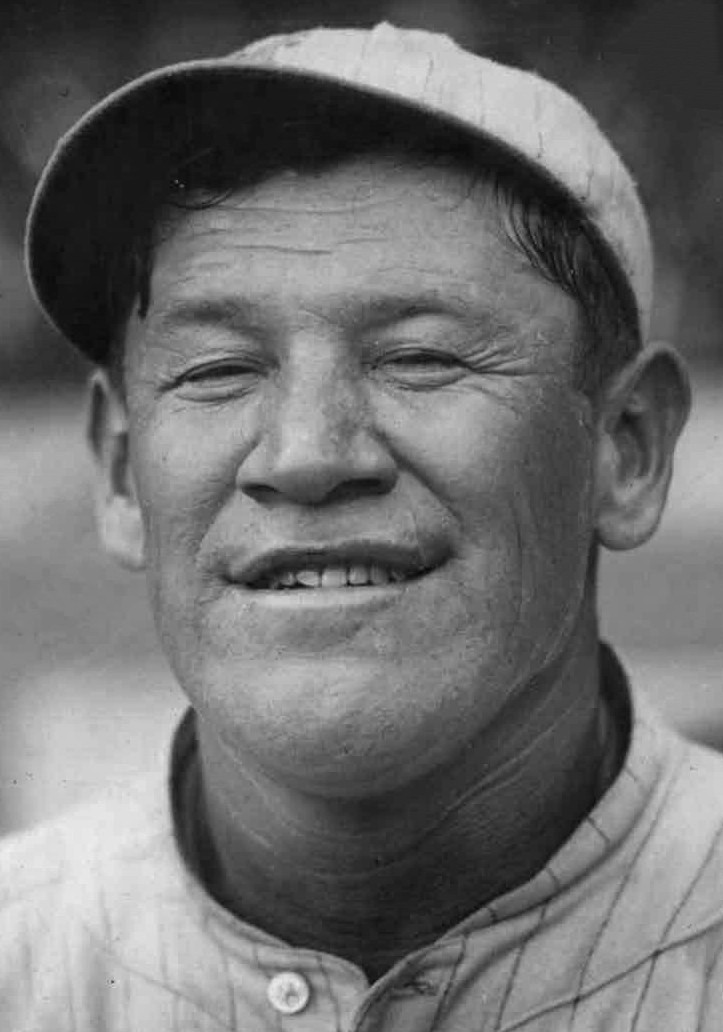
Jim Thorpe

- March 28 – Jim Thorpe, famed American Indian athlete considered by many the greatest athlete in recorded history, dies in Lomita, California at the age of 64. A native of Prague, Oklahoma, Thorpe played six seasons of Major League Baseball between 1913 and 1919, mostly for the New York Giants, in addition to his Olympic gold medals in the 1912 pentathlon and decathlon competition, while playing and coaching for a long time in the National Football League.

=== April ===
- April 5 – Herb Gorman, 28-year-old left-fielder for San Diego of the Pacific Coast League, suffers severe chest pain after hitting his second double of the game. Rushed to a local hospital, Gorman dies en route from a heart attack.
- April 9:
  - The financially-stressed St. Louis Browns sell Sportsman's Park to August A. Busch Jr., new owner of their National League tenants, the Cardinals, for $800,000. The brewery magnate will refurbish the 44-year-old edifice and rename it "Busch Stadium."
  - The Cincinnati Reds announce they're changing their official name to the Cincinnati Redlegs. The name "Reds" dates to 1890 and is derived from the famous Cincinnati Red Stockings of 1869. But American troops are fighting Communism in Korea and the Cold War is escalating globally; as Cincinnati's general manager, Gabe Paul, notes later, "We wanted to be certain we weren't confused with the 'Russian Reds'." The team's official identity will remain "Redlegs" until February 1959.
- April 13 – In Cincinnati, over 30,000 see the Milwaukee Braves win their first game, 2–0, behind the pitching of Max Surkont.
- April 14 – After a motorcade through its downtown streets, Milwaukee hosts its first major-league baseball game since the "original" Brewers, a turn-of-the-century American League team, played their last home game on September 12, 1901 before transferring to St. Louis for 1902. Today, the National League Braves debut before a delirious County Stadium crowd by defeating the St. Louis Cardinals in ten innings, 3–2. Warren Spahn gets the win, secured by rookie Bill Bruton's walk-off home run. The single-game attendance—34,357—represents 12 percent of the total turnstile count of the 1952 Boston Braves.
- April 15 – Triple-A baseball returns to Toledo with the relocation of the minor-league Milwaukee Brewers franchise that has been displaced by the MLB Braves. The Toledo Sox succeed the famous original Mud Hens, who moved to Charleston, West Virginia, on June 23, 1952. The T-Sox will win the regular-season American Association pennant and lead the circuit in attendance.
- April 16 – Connie Ryan of the Philadelphia Phillies, a .248 lifetime hitter, goes six-for-six (two doubles and four singles) in a 14–12 defeat at the hands of the Pittsburgh Pirates at Forbes Field. His is the first of two six-for-six days in MLB in 1953: the other is recorded by Jimmy Piersall of the Boston Red Sox against the St. Louis Browns at Sportsman's Park on June 10.
- April 17 – The New York Yankees' Mickey Mantle hits the longest home run in Griffith Stadium history, a 565-foot shot off Washington Senators' left-hander Chuck Stobbs. The Yankees win, 7–3.
- April 29 – Joe Adcock of the Milwaukee Braves hits the first home run ever hit over the center field wall of the Polo Grounds. The shot, measured 475 feet, comes off Jim Hearn in the third inning of the Braves' 3–1 victory over the New York Giants.
- April 30 – The Little-Bigger League changes its name to the Babe Ruth League.

=== May ===
- May 6 – At Sportsman's Park, Bobo Holloman of the St. Louis Browns no-hits the Philadelphia Athletics, 6–0, in his very first Major League start. (He had pitched five previous games in relief.) Holloman walks five and strikes out three in the majors' only no-hit game of the season. He will only post two more victories in his MLB career, with his final appearance coming on July 19 of this season.
- May 16 – At County Stadium, southpaw Curt Simmons of the Philadelphia Phillies allows a single to lead-off man Bill Bruton of the Milwaukee Braves—then he sets down the next 27 Braves' hitters in order, fanning ten of them. His 3–0 shutout is one of nine one-hitters in MLB in 1953.
- May 27 – The Detroit Tigers and Chicago White Sox battle 15 innings at Comiskey Park, but can't break a 2–2 deadlock. Each team has 12 hits. The game, halted by a 1 a.m. curfew, will be replayed in full at a later date.
- May 28 – It is the National League's turn for a tie game: in this case, at Crosley Field, the Cincinnati Redlegs battle back with two runs in the home half of the tenth to tie the St. Louis Cardinals, 10–all. Then the game is called so the Redbirds can catch a train.
- May 31 – At Ebbets Field, the Brooklyn Dodgers sweep a Sunday doubleheader from the last-place Pittsburgh Pirates, 4–3 and 4–1, to stretch their winning streak to ten. At 27–14, they lead the surprising, second-place Milwaukee Braves (25–13) by half a game.

=== June ===
- June 3 – Congress cites the research of New York City librarian Robert Henderson in proving that Alexander Cartwright "founded" baseball and not Abner Doubleday. His 1947 book Bat, Ball and Bishop documents Cartwright's contributions to the origins of the game of the baseball.
- June 4 – Future Hall-of-Fame slugger Ralph Kiner, who has led (or co-led) the NL in home runs every year since 1946, is traded by the Pittsburgh Pirates to the Chicago Cubs in a ten-player blockbuster. The Bucs send Kiner, pitcher Howie Pollet, catcher Joe Garagiola and outfielder Catfish Metkovich to Chicago for pitcher Bob Schultz, catcher Toby Atwell, infielders Preston Ward and George Freese, outfielders Bob Addis and Gene Hermanski, and cash.

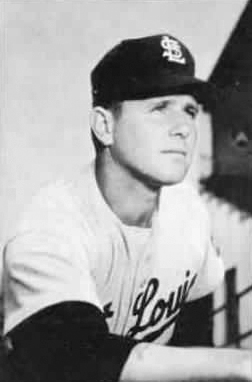
Virgil Trucks

- June 13 – The Chicago White Sox acquire veteran right-handed fire-baller Virgil Trucks and third baseman Bob Elliott from the St. Louis Browns for pitcher Lou Kretlow, catcher Darrell Johnson and $75,000. Trucks, 36, will win 47 games for the ChiSox over the next 2½ seasons.
- June 14 – The New York Yankees sweep the second-place Cleveland Indians, 6–2 and 3–0, before 74,708 at Cleveland Stadium to extend their winning streak to 18 games. The Bombers are 41–11 and 10½ games ahead of Cleveland in the American League. Two nights later, the St. Louis Browns' Duane Pillette defeats Whitey Ford 3–1 at Yankee Stadium to end the skein, with Satchel Paige getting the save.
- June 15 – Second-place Cleveland and the last-place Detroit Tigers make an eight-player trade. The Indians get pitchers Art Houtteman and Bill Wight, catcher Joe Ginsberg and infielder Owen Friend in exchange for hurlers Al Aber, Steve Gromek and Dick Weik, and hard-hitting infielder Ray Boone.
- June 17 – In 1953's longest MLB game, the Chicago Cubs outlast the Pittsburgh Pirates, 5–4, in 16 innings at Wrigley Field. Randy Jackson strikes the RBI single that makes reliever Turk Lown the winning hurler; Johnny Hetki is the hard-luck loser.
- June 18 – In a 23–3 thrashing of the Detroit Tigers at Fenway Park, the Boston Red Sox set a still-standing Major League record by scoring 17 runs in one inning. After scoring twice in the sixth to break a 3–3 tie, the Red Sox go on their record-breaking run-scoring output in the seventh. Eleven Boston players score in the inning, with Sammy White tallying three times and Gene Stephens (who also collects three hits in the inning, becoming the first Major Leaguer in modern history to do so), Tom Umphlett, Dick Gernert and winning pitcher Ellis Kinder scoring twice.
- June 19 – In perhaps the brightest moment of their so-far dismal season, the 15–43 Tigers sign 18-year-old "bonus baby" Al Kaline one day after he graduates from Baltimore's Southern High School.
- June 25 – Ted Kazanski collects three hits and four runs batted in in his MLB debut to lead the Philadelphia Phillies to a 13–2 victory over the Chicago Cubs at Wrigley Field. As a result, Kazanski becomes the first player in Major League history to drive in at least four runs as a shortstop in his major league debut, according to the Elias Sports Bureau.

=== July ===
- July 1 – The New York Giants claim right-hander Marv Grissom off waivers from the Boston Red Sox. Grissom, 35, will become one of the top relief pitchers in the National League over the next five seasons.
- July 4 – When the holiday doubleheaders are in the books, the half-way point of the 1953 season sees 1952's champions setting the pace once more: the Brooklyn Dodgers (45–27) hold a two-game lead over the Milwaukee Braves in the National League, and the New York Yankees (50–22) occupy first place in the American League by 6½ games over the Chicago White Sox.
- July 14 – The National League wins its fourth consecutive All–Star Game, 5–1, at Cincinnati's Crosley Field behind the stellar pitching of Robin Roberts and Warren Spahn. National League outfielder Enos Slaughter gets two hits, scores twice and robs Harvey Kuenn of an extra-base hit.
- July 22 – The Detroit Tigers release four-time 20-game-winner, two-time AL MVP, 6x All-Star and future Hall-of-Famer Hal Newhouser. The 32-year-old left-hander, who posted a 200–148 record and a 3.07 ERA over his 15 years as a Tiger, will make a comeback in 1954 as a relief specialist for the Cleveland Indians.
- July 29 – Billy Pierce of the Chicago White Sox surrenders a two-out, two-run, ninth-inning homer to George Kell of the Boston Red Sox before nailing down the final out of an 8–3 victory at Fenway Park. Pierce will not allow another run until the sixth inning of an August 19 game against the St. Louis Browns. His streak of 40 consecutive scoreless innings pitched is 1953's longest; it includes three complete-game shutouts and 72/3 frames of spotless relief.
- July 31 – At Milwaukee County Stadium, the Braves' Max Surkont and Philadelphia Phillies' Bob Miller each throw ten shutout innings and allow only four hits, before rain forces the game to end in a 0–0 tie.

=== August ===
- August 1 – Milwaukee Braves left-hander Warren Spahn throws a one-hitter to defeat the visiting Philadelphia Phillies, 5–0. He walks none, strikes out eight and faces 28 hitters, one over the minimum. Fellow future Hall-of-Famer Richie Ashburn reaches him for a single in the fourth inning for the only blemish on an otherwise perfect outing. It is Spahn's second and last career one-hitter, although he'll fire no-hitters in both 1960 and 1961. Coincidentally, Spahn's near-perfecto turns the tables on the Phillies, whose lefty Curt Simmons has put up a similar outing on May 16 against the Braves at Milwaukee County Stadium.
- August 2 – Over fifty Los Angeles police are dispatched to Gilmore Field to quell an on-field brawl between the city's two Pacific Coast League teams, the minor-league Angels and the Hollywood Stars. The melee between the bitter rivals, engaged in a beanball war, is the third within three days, and lasts for a full half-hour. Los Angeles police chief William Parker is watching the game on television from his home when the slugfest breaks out, and he orders his men to Hollywood's home stadium to restore order. No arrests are made, but Parker warns both sides that further violence will result in "disturbing the peace" charges.
- August 5 – Rookie Don Larsen of the St. Louis Browns pitches a complete game but drops a 5–0 decision to the Boston Red Sox at Fenway Park. However, he goes three for three at the plate to set a consecutive-hits record for pitchers with seven. Over the course of Larsen's 14-season career, he will prove to be one of MLB's best-hitting hurlers, batting .242 with 144 hits (including 25 doubles, five triples and 14 home runs) and 72 RBI in 596 at bats.
- August 6 – Ted Williams' name appears in an MLB box score for the first time since April 30, 1952, days before he began his active Korean War service as a United States Marine Corps pilot. The Boston Red Sox legend flew 37 combat missions during his tour of duty, and survived a crash-landing when his plane was hit by enemy fire in February. Today, Williams pinch hits for Tom Umphlett in the ninth inning of a 7–7 tie against the St. Louis Browns at Fenway Park. He pops out to first base, but after six more appearances as an emergency batsman, he returns to his familiar post in left field and resumes his lusty hitting. By season's end, he gets into 37 games (26 of them as starting left fielder), and smashes 37 hits, including 13 home runs, in 91 at bats, for a batting average of .407 and an OPS of 1.410.
- August 8 – The New York Yankees deal a double setback to their closest pennant pursuer, the Chicago White Sox, by shutting them out in both ends of a doubleheader at Yankee Stadium, 1–0 (behind Whitey Ford) and 3–0 (behind Bob Kuzava). In the second game, Kuzava throws a one-hitter, allowing only a double to Bob Boyd in the second inning. The double defeat drops the White Sox to eight games out of first place.
- August 10 – The Washington Senators' Bob Porterfield one-hits the Boston Red Sox, winning 2–0 at Griffith Stadium. Jimmy Piersall reaches base twice, with Boston's only hit (in the third inning) and a base on balls.
- August 12 – The visiting New York Yankees lash 28 hits in their 22–1 pasting of the Washington Senators. Yogi Berra belts the Bombers' only home run, and he and Billy Martin each drive in five tallies. Hank Bauer scores five runs, and Whitey Ford and Gene Woodling each have four hits.
- August 30 – In Game 1 of a doubleheader, Jim Pendleton slugs three home runs, as the Milwaukee Braves rout the Pittsburgh Pirates at Forbes Field, 19–4. The Braves tie the major league record for most home runs in a single game with eight, held by the New York Yankees since 1939. Pendleton becomes only the second rookie in history to hit three home runs in one game, joining teammate Eddie Mathews, who accomplished the feat just a year earlier. In the second game of the twin bill, the Braves hit four more long balls and crush Pittsburgh again, 11–5. Mathews belts three dingers on the day, giving him a National League-leading 43. He will finish the season with 47 home runs, 30 of them on the road—also a major league record. Only the Yankees have ever hit more home runs in consecutive games, or in a doubleheader: on June 28, 1939, against the Philadelphia Athletics at Shibe Park, they belted eight home runs in a 23–2 victory in the first game of a twin bill, then five more in a 10–0 win in the nightcap.

=== September ===
- September 1 – The last month of MLB's regular season holds little promise of pennant races. The Brooklyn Dodgers, having gone 48–14 (.774) in July and August, have built a 10½-game lead over the Milwaukee Braves in the National League; meanwhile, the New York Yankees remain comfortably in front of the Chicago White Sox (8½ lengths) in the American League with 22 games left to play.
- September 2 – The St. Louis Cardinals overcome a three-run inside-the-park home run by shortstop Ted Kazanski to beat the Philadelphia Phillies‚ 10–7. Rip Repulski hits his 20th home run of the season for St. Louis‚ breaking the team's rookie record set by Johnny Mize in 1936. The Cardinals hammer 10 hits off Phillies starter Robin Roberts to hand him his 12th loss.
- September 5 – Dick Kokos' 12th-inning home run settles matters as the St. Louis Browns defeat the Detroit Tigers, 1–0 in St. Louis. The Browns' Bob Turley fans 14 and gains the shutout win, while veteran Ralph Branca, who went 11 scoreless innings for Detroit, absorbs the hard-luck defeat.
- September 6 – At the Polo Grounds, Brooklyn Dodgers right-fielder Carl Furillo's rage at brushback pitches from New York Giants hurlers finally boils over when he's plunked on the right wrist by a Rubén Gómez offering. After he takes first base, Furillo charges the Giants' nearby dugout. His target: New York manager Leo Durocher. Punches are thrown and Furillo, 31, reportedly grabs Durocher, 48, by the throat before peacemakers separate them. The two combatants are thrown out of the game, ultimately, a 6–3 Dodger win. It's Furillo's only career ejection. He also suffers a fractured left hand in the fracas, sidelining him until the 1953 World Series, in which he will bat .333 with eight hits.
- September 8 – The Chicago Cubs sign shortstop Ernie Banks of the Kansas City Monarchs. On September 17, Banks will become the first black player in Chicago Cub history. Moreover, he will earn fame as "Mister Cub" who, over 19 seasons, will blast 512 home runs as a 14-time All-Star, two-time National League MVP (1958, 1959) and Gold Glove Award winner. Then, in 1977, he becomes a first-ballot Hall of Famer; his #14 is retired five years later.
- September 12 – Carl Erskine defeats the second-place Milwaukee Braves 5–2, as the Brooklyn Dodgers clinch the pennant earlier than any other team in history. Brooklyn (98–44) leads Milwaukee by 13 games with 12 to play.
- September 13 – Pitcher Bob Trice becomes the first black player in Philadelphia Athletics history.
- September 14 – The New York Yankees clinch their fifth straight pennant with an 8–5 win over the Cleveland Indians. Second baseman Billy Martin has four RBIs. The Yankees and Dodgers will meet in the 1953 World Series for the second straight year and the fourth time in seven years.
- September 16 – Hall-of-Fame former second baseman Rogers Hornsby resigns as manager of the sixth place, 64–82 Cincinnati Redlegs. Hornsby, whose .358 lifetime batting average is contemporaneously ranked as second only to Ty Cobb's .367, wraps up a 14-year MLB managerial career with a won–lost mark of 701–812–17 (.463). After coach Buster Mills finishes Cincinnati's season as interim manager, the Redlegs will hire former American League catcher Birdie Tebbetts as their pilot for 1954.
- September 20 – The Milwaukee Braves split a double-header with the Redlegs at County Stadium in their final home date of 1953. They draw 36,011 fans, setting a new National League attendance record (1,826,397) which they will promptly shatter in 1954 by drawing over 2.1 million spectators. On and off the field, 1953 is a spectacular first season in Wisconsin for the Braves, who improve from seventh to second place and signal their arrival as a contending team for the rest of the 1950s.

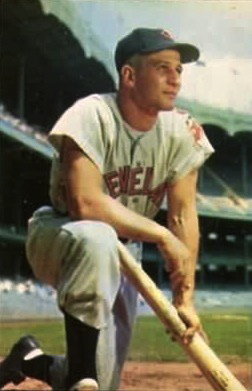
Cleveland's Al Rosen

- September 27
  - Al Rosen of the Cleveland Indians, who leads the American League in home runs (43) and runs batted in (145), is chasing the Triple Crown as he battles Mickey Vernon of the Washington Senators for the batting title. Rosen is batting .3361 entering his final at bat in the ninth inning; a hit will lift his average to .3372, one ten-thousandth of a point higher than Vernon's .3371, and earn him the crown. But he bounces out to third base, to finish the season at .3356.
  - Only 3,174 are on hand as the St. Louis Browns play their final home game at Sportsman's Park. The Brownies fall to the Chicago White Sox' Billy Pierce 2–1 in 11 innings. In their 52nd and last season in St. Louis, the American Leaguers attract only 297,238 fans.

=== October ===
- October 2 – In Game 3 of the 1953 World Series at Ebbets Field, Brooklyn Dodgers right-hander Carl Erskine racks up 14 strikeouts, breaking by one "K" Howard Ehmke's 24-year-old Fall Classic record, and vanquishes the New York Yankees by a 3–2 score. Erskine fans Joe Collins and Mickey Mantle four times each. His complete-game triumph is Brooklyn's first of the best-of-seven series.
- October 5 – The Yankees win their record-setting fifth consecutive World Series championship and sixteenth overall, defeating the visiting Dodgers, 4–3, in Game 6 of the 1953 Fall Classic, to prevail, four games to two. Billy Martin is the star with a record-setting 12 hits, including the game-winning single in the bottom of the ninth of today's clincher.
- October 7 – Bill Veeck, facing dwindling attendance and revenue, is forced to sell the St. Louis Browns to a Baltimore-based group led by attorney Clarence Miles and brewer Jerry Hoffberger. The Browns will move to Baltimore and be known as the Orioles starting in the 1954 season.
- October 8 – Jackie Robinson attempts to stage a barnstorming game in Birmingham, Alabama. However, city officials object to the team being integrated and bans Robinson from the city. It is only after Robinson agrees to release all the white players, that the city removes its objection and allows the team to play.
- October 10 – Hall-of-Fame second baseman and all-time Detroit Tiger great Charlie Gehringer steps down as the club's general manager after two difficult seasons. Farm system director Muddy Ruel, 57, succeeds him. The rebuilding Tigers were 110–198 (.357) during Gehringer's GM tenure.
- October 14 – Brooklyn Dodgers president Walter O'Malley tells the press that "the Dodgers will have a new manager next year." The announcement reveals that incumbent skipper Chuck Dressen, coming off 105 victories and a second-straight National League pennant in 1953, has demanded a three-year contract to return for 1954; O'Malley's policy is to limit his managers' contract terms to one year only. Although O'Malley gives Dressen "a few more days" to reconsider his demand, on October 28 it is reported that Dressen will not return to Brooklyn, instead signing a three-year pact to manage the Oakland Oaks of the Open-Classification Pacific Coast League. The defending NL champs begin their search for a new pilot.
- October 28 – Legendary Brooklyn Dodgers' play-by-play announcer Red Barber resigns and takes a job as broadcaster for the rival New York Yankees. Barber is upset that Dodger owner Walter O'Malley has refused to support him in his fee-negotiation dispute with Gillette, sponsor of the television coverage of the 1953 World Series.

=== November ===
- November 4 – In what some see as a cost-cutting measure, the Philadelphia Athletics replace skipper Jimmy Dykes with player-manager Eddie Joost, 37, the club's longtime shortstop.
- November 9 – Reaffirming its earlier position, the United States Supreme Court rules, 7–2, that baseball is a sport and not a business and therefore not subject to antitrust laws. The ruling is made in a case involving New York Yankees minor league player George Toolson, who refused to move from Triple-A to Double-A.
- November 10 – The New York Giants end their tour of Japan. It is reported that each Giants player received just $331 of the $3,000 they were promised.
- November 14 – Jimmy Dykes becomes the first manager of the reborn Baltimore Orioles, ten days after his release from the same position with the Philadelphia Athletics. In October, Arthur Ehlers, former Philadelphia general manager, made the same switch to Baltimore. The Orioles are the transplanted St. Louis Browns, set to rejoin the American League after a 52-year absence in 1954. On November 11, Ehlers had fired Marty Marion, the Browns' manager whom he and the Orioles have inherited.
- November 19 – Roy Campanella, Brooklyn's Cooperstown-bound catcher, wins the second of what will be his three National League MVP Awards, capturing 17 of 24 first-place ballots. In an unusual pattern, Campanella will be named MVP every other year between 1951 and 1955.
- November 24 – After what The New York Times calls a month-long "guessing game," the Brooklyn Dodgers sign Walter Alston, 42, a veteran minor-league manager, to a one-year pact to lead their team on the field in 1954. Although he has fashioned an outstanding record in Brooklyn's farm system, most recently with the Triple-A St. Paul Saints and Montreal Royals, Alston is so obscure a choice compared to well-known figures such as Pee Wee Reese, Bill Terry and Frank Frisch—all objects of press speculation—that some New York newspapers bear the headline "Wally Who?" But Alston will manage the Brooklyn/Los Angeles Dodgers over the next 23 seasons (all on one-year contracts), winning 2,040 games, seven NL pennants, four World Series championships, and a berth in the Baseball Hall of Fame.
- November 27 – Cleveland Indians third baseman Al Rosen, who missed out on the American League's Triple Crown by .0015 batting average points, is unanimously selected the AL's Most Valuable Player.

=== December ===
- December 1 – The Boston Red Sox trade for hard-hitting right fielder Jackie Jensen, sending pitcher Mickey McDermott and outfielder Tom Umphlett to the Washington Senators. Jensen will average 25 home runs a year during his seven seasons for Boston, lead the league in RBI three times, make two All-Star squads, and win a Gold Glove Award and the American League Most Valuable Player Award in 1958. A fear of flying will end his career prematurely.
- December 2 – The St. Louis Cardinals obtain rookie shortstop Alex Grammas from the Cincinnati Redlegs for pitcher Jack Crimian and $100,000.
- December 16 – In an 11-player deal, the New York Yankees trade pitcher Johnny Gray, catcher Jim Robertson, first basemen Don Bollweg and Vic Power, third baseman Jim Finigan, outfielder Bill Renna and $25,000 to the Philadelphia Athletics for pitcher Harry Byrd, first baseman Eddie Robinson, third baseman Loren Babe, and outfielders Tom Hamilton and Carmen Mauro.
- December 17 – The Athletics obtain left-handed pitcher Bob Cain from the Baltimore Orioles for hurlers Joe Coleman Sr. and Frank Fanovich.
- December 23 – Jim Gilliam of the Brooklyn Dodgers is named NL Rookie of the Year, beating out Harvey Haddix and Ray Jablonski for the honor. Eight days earlier, Harvey Kuenn of the Detroit Tigers took home the American League version of the award, winning 23 of 24 votes cast.
- December 26 – The Milwaukee Braves trade six players, plus $100,000 cash, to the Pittsburgh Pirates for 24-year-old third baseman Danny O'Connell. The six: pitchers Curt Raydon, Max Surkont, Fred Waters and minor-leaguer Larry Lassalle and outfielders Sid Gordon and Sam Jethroe. The Braves plan to use O'Connell at second base in 1954.

== Movies ==
- The Kid from Left Field
- Big Leaguer

== Births ==
=== January ===
- January 1
  - Lynn Jones
  - Joe Pittman
- January 5 – Jim Gantner
- January 8 – Bruce Sutter
- January 9
  - Iván DeJesús
  - Phil Mankowski
- January 12 – Terry Whitfield
- January 13 – Odell Jones
- January 16 – Dennis DeBarr
- January 17 – Mark Littell
- January 24 – Tim Stoddard
- January 25 – Junior Moore
- January 26 – Tom Bruno
- January 31 – Mike Rowland

=== February ===
- February 4 – Rob Picciolo
- February 7 – Dan Quisenberry
- February 11 – Tom Veryzer
- February 12 – Dave Revering
- February 17
  - Jamie Easterly
  - Jim Umbarger
- February 21 – Rick Lysander
- February 22 – Gerry Davis
- February 23 – Fred Kuhaulua
- February 24
  - Mike Sember
  - Frank Riccelli
- February 27 – Ron Hassey

=== March ===
- March 1 – Jeff Holly
- March 2
  - Dave Tobik
  - Larry Wolfe
- March 6 – Gerry Hannahs
- March 7 – Randy Stein
- March 8
  - Jim Rice
  - Don Werner
- March 14 – Tim Ireland
- March 16
  - Jay Franklin
  - Rich Puig
- March 18 – Randy Miller
- March 19 – Tim Corcoran
- March 22 – Dan Boitano
- March 23 – Bo Díaz
- March 27 – Gary Alexander
- March 29 – Tom Hume
- March 30 – Mike Miley
- March 31 – Tom Hausman

=== April ===
- April 1 – Larry Murray
- April 2 – Héctor Cruz
- April 5 – Kim Allen
- April 14 – Mark Bomback
- April 16
  - Don Reynolds
  - Bruce Taylor
- April 21 – Joe Keener
- April 26 – Arturo DeFreites

=== May ===
- May 3 – Keith Smith
- May 5 – Gary Christenson
- May 6 – Larry Andersen
- May 9 – Ron Jackson
- May 12 – Taylor Duncan
- May 15 – George Brett
- May 16 – Rick Rhoden
- May 28 – Rafael Landestoy
- May 29 – Mike Dupree

=== June ===
- June 1 – Rick Baldwin
- June 3 – Ed Glynn
- June 4 – Larry Demery
- June 5 – Paul Siebert
- June 6 – Dave Bergman
- June 8 – Jack Kucek
- June 10
  - Francisco Barrios
  - Rick Camp
- June 14
  - Luis Aponte
  - Mark Lee
- June 20 – Tony Chévez
- June 21
  - Charlie Moore
  - Gene Pentz
- June 22 – Roy Thomas
- June 27 – Joe Zdeb

=== July ===
- July 2 – Tony Armas
- July 3 – Frank Tanana
- July 11 – Sam Hinds
- July 12 – Roy Branch
- July 13 – Joe Cannon
- July 14 – Billy Smith
- July 16 – Sheldon Mallory
- July 20 – Gary Woods
- July 22 – Kevin Pasley
- July 25 – Biff Pocoroba
- July 28
  - Jerry Maddox
  - Mark Williams
- July 31 – Hank Small

=== August ===
- August 4 – Masataka Nashida
- August 5
  - Rick Bosetti
  - John Hale
  - Jesús de la Rosa
  - Rick Mahler
- August 8 – Alvis Woods
- August 10 – Tom Brookens
- August 11
  - Rex Hudson
  - Dennis Lewallyn
- August 15 – Nino Espinosa
- August 16 – Nick Leyva
- August 20 – Dan Dumoulin
- August 24 – Luis Sánchez
- August 25 – Bob Lacey
- August 29 – Marv Foley
- August 31
  - Juan Bernhardt
  - Bill Nahorodny

=== September ===
- September 1 – Rob Wilfong
- September 2 – Danny Goodwin
- September 3 – Mike Paxton
- September 7 – La Rue Washington
- September 9 – Steve Ratzer
- September 11 – Mike Gordon
- September 12 – Greg Keatley
- September 15 – Oswaldo Olivares
- September 16 – Chris Knapp
- September 18 – Mark DeJohn
- September 23 – Brian Asselstine
- September 25
  - Dick Davis
  - Ed Putman
- September 26 – Jim Gideon
- September 29
  - Warren Cromartie
  - Gene Richards
  - Carlos Tosca
- September 30 – Dan Gonzales

=== October ===
- October 1 – Pete Falcone
- October 2 – Kevin Kobel
- October 4 – Dave Schuler
- October 6 – Victor Bernal
- October 7 – Andy Replogle
- October 14 – Kiko Garcia
- October 16 – Rodney Scott
- October 20 – Keith Hernandez
- October 21 – Juan Eichelberger
- October 22 – Rich Wortham
- October 23 – Bo McLaughlin
- October 27
  - Barry Bonnell
  - U. L. Washington
- October 29 – Randy McGilberry

=== November ===
- November 2 – Paul Hartzell
- November 3
  - Larry Herndon
  - Bobby Thompson
- November 4 – Roger Slagle
- November 6
  - John Candelaria
  - Brock Pemberton
- November 10

Larry Christenson

  - Larry Parrish
  - Paul Thormodsgard
- November 14 – Kim Andrew
- November 18 – Gilberto Rondón
- November 20 – Duane Theiss
- November 22 – Rick Matula
- November 29 – Sixto Lezcano

=== December ===
- December 3
  - Bob Pate
  - Pat Putnam
- December 4 – Charlie Beamon Jr.
- December 6 – Gary Ward
- December 9 – Hiromitsu Ochiai
- December 18 – Roy Howell
- December 20 – Paul Moskau
- December 22 – Tom Underwood
- December 23 – Jerry Manuel
- December 25 – Rick Anderson
- December 30 – Steve Davis
- December 31 – José Báez

== Deaths ==
=== January ===
- January 1 – Doug McWeeny, 56, pitcher who played for the Chicago White Sox, Brooklyn Robins and Cincinnati Reds over seven seasons between 1921 and 1930.
- January 2 – Harry Atkinson, 78, left fielder for the 1895 St. Louis Browns.
- January 3
  - Joe Houser, 61, pitcher who played for the Buffalo Buffeds of the outlaw Federal League in 1914.
  - Chuck Workman, 37, right fielder and third baseman who played for the Cleveland Indians, Boston Braves and Pittsburgh Pirates in parts of four seasons spanning 1938–1946.
- January 5
  - Mike Cantwell, 58, pitcher who played with the New York Yankees in 1916 and for the Philadelphia Phillies from 1919 to 1920.
  - Pete Lapan, 61, backup catcher for the Washington Senators in 1922 and 1923.
- January 9 – Pat Carney, 76, pitcher who played from 1901 through 1904 for the Boston Beaneaters of the National League.
- January 11 – Doc Moskiman, 73, first baseman and right fielder for the Boston Red Sox in its 1910 season, who also spent parts of 13 seasons playing minor-league and independent-league ball, pitching more often than not and obtaining considerably good results.
- January 14 – Charlie Small, 47, center fielder who played in 25 games for the Boston Red Sox during their 1930 season.
- January 15 – Carl East, 58, outfielder and pitcher who played with the St. Louis Browns in 1915 and for the Washington Senators in 1924.
- January 21
  - Lorenza Cobb, 64, Negro league baseball catcher who played for the Indianapolis ABCs, West Baden Sprudels, St. Louis Giants and Lincoln Giants over seven seasons spanning 1914–1920.
  - José Rodríguez, 58, Cuban Baseball Hall of Fame infielder whose 18-year career in professional baseball included a stint with the New York Giants of the National League from 1917 to 1918.
- January 24 – Ben Taylor, 64, National Baseball Hall of Fame player, manager, coach and umpire, who played for 24 different teams in Negro League Baseball between 1908 and 1941, being considered the best first baseman in black baseball prior to the arrival of Buck Leonard and one of the most productive players offensively, while collecting a .334 lifetime batting average and hitting over .300 in fifteen of his first sixteen years in baseball.
- January 27 – Merv Shea, 52, catcher who played in 439 games for seven teams in a span of 11 seasons from 1927 to 1944; also coached for the Detroit Tigers, Philadelphia Phillies and Chicago Cubs during the 1940s.
- January 28 – Howie Haworth, 59, catcher who made seven game appearances for the Cleveland Indians in its 1915 season.
- January 31 – Mike Handiboe, 65, backup outfielder for the 1911 New York Highlanders.

=== February ===
- February 2 – Mike Dejan, 38, outfielder for the Cincinnati Reds in its 1940 season.
- February 3 – Frank Donnelly, 83, pitcher who played for the Chicago Colts in part of two seasons from 1893 to 1894.
- February 6
  - Ed Haigh, 86, backup outfielder for the St. Louis Browns of the National League in 1892.
  - Tex Pruiett, 69, pitcher who played from 1907 through 1908 for the Boston Americans and Red Sox.
- February 13 – Happy Foreman, 53, relief pitcher who played with the Chicago White Sox in 1924 and for the Boston Red Sox in 1926.
- February 21 – Buck Freeman, 56. pitcher who played for the Chicago Cubs in the 1921 and 1922 seasons.
- February 24 – Lenny Metz, 53, shortstop who played for the Philadelphia Phillies in a span of three seasons from 1923 to 1925.
- February 27 – Barney Wolfe, 77, pitcher who played four seasons from 1903 to 1906 for the New York Highlanders and the Washington Senators.

=== March ===
- March 3 – Clyde Milan, 65, speedy outfielder and solid line drive hitter who batted .285 for the Washington Senators over the course of 16 seasons from 1907 to 1922, collecting 2,100 hits, 1,004 runs and 495 stolen bases, and leading the American League by stealing 88 bases in 1912 and 75 in 1913, while setting a modern-rules MLB season record for steals in 1912, a mark surpassed three years later by Ty Cobb; player-manager of 1922 Senators and member of Washington coaching staff for 17 seasons (1928–1929 and 1938 until his death).
- March 6 – Tex Pruiett, 69, pitcher who played from 1907 through 1908 for the Boston Americans and Red Sox.
- March 7 – Tom Wilson, 62, backup catcher who played for the Washington Senators in its 1914 season.
- March 11
  - Jock Menefee, 85, pitcher for the Pittsburgh Pirates, Louisville Colonels, New York Giants, Chicago Orphans and Chicago Cubs in a span of nine seasons from 1892 to 1903, who gained notoriety with the Cubs on July 15, 1902, when he became the first pitcher in National League history to pull off a successful steal of home, a feat which he accomplished against the Brooklyn Superbas on July 15, 1902, and later on August 8, 1903, for start and win both games of a doubleheader against Brooklyn, as he finished his career starting both games of a doubleheader for the third time of the season, against Pittsburgh on September 7, but did not get a decision in either contest.
  - Fred Toney, 64, trustworthy pitcher whose 11-season major league career included stints with the Chicago Cubs, Cincinnati Reds, New York Giants and St. Louis Cardinals between 1911 and 1923, being a member of the Giants that won World Series titles in 1921 and 1922, while pitching a 10-inning no-hitter with Cincinnati against the Cubs on May 2, 1917, and ending his career with a 139–102 record and 2.69 earned run average in 336 appearances, including 158 complete games and 28 shutouts in 2,206 innings of work.
- March 16 – Oscar Jones, 76, pitcher who played from 1903 through 1905 for the Brooklyn Superbas.
- March 20 – John Brackenridge, 72, pitcher who played for the Philadelphia Phillies in its 1904 season.
- March 21 – Harry Truby, 82, 19th century second baseman who played from 1895 to 1896 with the Chicago Colts and Pittsburgh Pirates.
- March 22 – Michael Driscoll, 60, pitcher for the 1916 Philadelphia Athletics.
- March 25 – Tim Griesenbeck, 55, backup catcher for the 1920 St. Louis Cardinals.
- March 28 – Jim Thorpe, 65, Native American and one of the greatest all-around athlete in the first half of the 20th century, who in addition to playing in MLB for six seasons between 1913 and 1919, won gold medals in the 1912 Summer Olympics in pentathlon and decathlon, played in the NFL for eight seasons between 1920 and 1928, barnstormed as a basketball player with a team composed entirely of American Indians, playing professional sports before retiring in 1928 at age 41, and later appeared in several films as an actor while being portrayed by Burt Lancaster in the 1951 biopic Jim Thorpe – All-American.
- March 30 – Alva Bradley, 69, principal owner of the Cleveland Indians from 1927 until he sold the franchise to Bill Veeck in 1946.

=== April ===
- April 3 – Larry Benton, 55, pitcher who played for the Boston Braves, New York Giants and Cincinnati Reds over parts of thirteen seasons from 1923 to 1935, leading the National League with 25 wins and 28 complete games in 1928, and twice in W-L record from 1927 to 1928.
- April 5
  - Tex Erwin, 67, catcher who played with the Detroit Tigers in 1907, and for the Cincinnati Reds and the Brooklyn Superbas, Robins and Dodgers clubs in a span of five seasons from 1910 to 1914.
  - Connie Walsh, 70, pitcher who appeared in one game for the Pittsburgh Pirates in its 1907 season.
  - Herb Gorman, 28, outfielder/first baseman who made a pinch-hit appearance for the 1952 St. Louis Cardinals; suffered a fatal heart attack while playing in a Pacific Coast League game.
- April 11
  - Kid Nichols, Hall of Fame pitcher who posted 361 victories for the seventh most wins in Major League Baseball history, died in Kansas City, Missouri at the age of 79. Born in Madison, Wisconsin, Nichols anchored the pitching staff of the Boston Beaneaters between 1890 and 1901, guiding Boston to five National League championships in his first nine seasons with the club. He surpassed the 30-victory plateau seven times from 1891 to 1894 and 1896–1898, as his career record shows that he hurled 20 or more wins in ten consecutive seasons from 1891 to 1994 and in 1904. In addition, he remains as the youngest pitcher to reach the illustrious 300-win milestone, getting there months before his 31st birthday. His most productive season came in 1892, when he had a 35–16 record and won two games in the league's Championship Series as the Beaneaters defeated Cy Young and the Cleveland Spiders. Nichols remained with Boston through 1901, when the team let him go in an effort to save money. After a two-year lapse, he returned to the majors as manager and pitcher for the St. Louis Cardinals from 1904 to 1905 and ended his career with the Philadelphia Phillies in 1905. Overall, Nichols posted a 2.96 ERA, led the National league in wins for three straight years from 1896 to 1898, pitched more than 300 innings in every season but three and more than 400 five times while pitching 532 complete games and 48 shutouts in 562 starts, and was never removed from a game for a relief hurler. Besides, his record of seven seasons with 30 or more victories is a mark that is likely to stand forever, since the implementation of five-man rotations, pitch count and inning limits in modern baseball.
  - Bruce Wetmore, 77, Canadian-born Boston businessman and associate of Charles F. Adams who was a co-owner of the Braves from 1927 through 1935.
- April 14 – Roy Patterson, 77, Chicago White Sox pitcher best remembered for throwing the first pitch and recording the first win in the first official American League game on April 24, 1901, defeating the Cleveland Blues at Chicago's South Side Park, 8–2, while collecting an 81–72 career record and 2.75 ERA for Chicago in seven seasons from 1901 to 1907, including AL pennants in 1901 and 1906, though he did not pitch for the 1906 World Series champion White Sox team.
- April 16 – Sam Gray, 55, pitcher in 379 games for the Philadelphia Athletics and St. Louis Browns over ten seasons from 1924 to 1933; won 20 games for 1928 Browns, then lost 24 for them three years later; led American League in shutouts in 1929.
- April 18
  - Harry Niles, 72, outfielder and second baseman who played from 1906 through 1910 for the St. Louis Browns, New York Highlanders, Boston Red Sox and Cleveland Naps.
  - Cotton Tierney, 59, second baseman and third baseman who played from 1920 to 1925 for the Pittsburgh Pirates, Philadelphia Phillies, Boston Braves and Brooklyn Dodgers, being honored by his great-great-nephew Jeff Euston, who created in 2005 a website named Cot's Baseball Contracts, which track all salaries of MLB players, contracts, bonuses, service time and franchise values.
- April 26 – Don Brennan, 49, pitcher who played for the New York Yankees, Cincinnati Reds and New York Giants in a span of five seasons from 1933 to 1937.
- April 29 – Gene McAuliffe, 81, backup catcher for the 1904 Boston Beaneaters

=== May ===
- May 2 – Fred Miller, 66, pitcher who made six appearances for the 1910 Brooklyn Superbas.
- May 3
  - Kewpie Pennington, 56, pitcher for the 1917 St. Louis Browns.
  - Pete Scott, 55, backup outfielder who played from 1926 through 1928 for the Chicago Cubs and Pittsburgh Pirates.
- May 6 – Jim Jones, 76, outfielder who played for the Louisville Colonels and New York Giants in part of three seasons spanning 1897–1901.
- May 11 – Ed Hug, 68, backup catcher who played for the Brooklyn Superbas in its 1903 season.
- May 12 – Ed Summers, 68, pitcher for the Detroit Tigers over five seasons from 1908 to 1912, who posted a 24–12 record and 1.64 ERA in 301 innings of work in his rookie season, including two complete game victories over the Philadelphia Athletics in a doubleheader, finishing with a two-hit, 1–0 shutout in ten innings in the second game, becoming the only pitcher in major league history to throw two complete game victories and more than eighteen innings in both games of a doubleheader, a record that remain intact.
- May 13 – Jim Field, 90, 19th-century first baseman who played most of his career with five American Association clubs during four seasons between 1883 and 1890, but also played in the National League for the 1898 Washington Senators.
- May 16 – Jim Wallace, 71, backup outfielder for the 1905 Pittsburgh Pirates.
- May 19 – Sam Leever, 81, pitcher who spent his 13-year career with the Pittsburgh Pirates from 1898 to 1910, compiling a 194–100 record for a .660 W–L percentage, the ninth highest in MLB baseball history, leading the National League with a 2.06 ERA and seven shutouts in 1903 and in W-L% three times, while amassing 20 or more wins in four seasons.
- May 25 – Ray Grimes, 69, first baseman for the Boston Red Sox, Chicago Cubs and Philadelphia Phillies in a span of six seasons from 1921 to 1926, who posted a .329/.413/.480 line in 433 games and established a Major League season record with at least one run batted in over 17 consecutive games in 1922, a mark which still stands.
- May 27 – Jesse Burkett, Hall of Fame left fielder and three-time batting champion, died in Worcester, Massachusetts, at the age of 84. Born on December 4, 1868, in Wheeling, West Virginia, Burkett made his professional baseball debut in 1888 as a pitcher, winning 27 games for a minor league team in Pennsylvania. The next year, he posted a 39–6 record for a team in his native Worcester before surfacing in the National League in 1890 with the New York Giants, where he was turned into an outfielder. Afterwards, he joined the Cleveland Spiders from 1891 to 1898. In 1899, Burkette was assigned to the St. Louis Perfectos/Cardinals. He won three National League batting titles from 1895 to 1901, surpassing the .400 mark twice, hitting for the Spiders .405 and .410 in 1895 and 1896, respectively. In 1901, Burkett captured his third batting title with a .376 mark for the Cardinals, before finishing his 16-year career in the American League. Burkett jumped to the St. Louis Browns in 1902, playing for them three years before ending his career with the 1905 Boston Americans, who later became the Red Sox. Overall, Burkett compiled a lifetime batting average of .338 on the strength of 2,850 hits in 2,607 games, including a .415 on-base percentage, 320 doubles and 1,720 runs scored, while sharing with Rogers Hornsby and Ty Cobb the record of hitting .400 or better the most times. He also earned a 1916 World Series ring as a coach for his former Giants team.

=== June ===
- June 7 – Bill Burns, 73, left handed pitcher for five Major League Baseball teams in five seasons from 1908 to 1912, who infamously returned to the majors as one of the conspirators in the famous Black Sox Scandal.
- June 11 – Tex Vache, 64, fourth outfielder for the 1925 Boston Red Sox.
- June 22 – Charlie Hemphill, 77, outfielder who played for six teams over 11 seasons from 1899 to 1911, being also the first Opening Day right fielder in Boston Americans/Red Sox franchise history in its 1901 season.

=== July ===
- July 5 – Frank McCue, 54, third baseman who made two games appearances for the 1922 Philadelphia Athletics.
- July 11 – Lew Wendell, 61, catcher for the New York Giants and Philadelphia Phillies over five seasons spanning 1915–1926.
- July 21 – Al Kellogg, 66, pitcher for the Philadelphia Athletics during their 1908 season.
- July 25 – Pat Hilly, 66, right fielder for the Philadelphia Phillies in its 1914 season.
- July 30 – Leon Chagnon, 50, pitcher who played for the Pittsburgh Pirates and New York Giants in a span of six seasons between 1929 and 1935.

=== August ===
- August 6 – Bill Phyle, 78, two-way player who pitched over twelve seasons from 1898 through 1999 with the Chicago Orphans and for the New York Giants in 1901, before performing as a third baseman for the St. Louis Cardinals in 1906, working later as an umpire in the Pacific Coast League.
- August 7 – Abner Powell, 98, 19th century pitcher who played in the Union Association for the Washington Nationals in 1884, playing later in the American Association for the Baltimore Orioles and Cincinnati Red Stockings during the 1886 season.
- August 9 – Joe Evans, 56, third baseman and outfielder whose career included stints with the Cleveland Indians, Washington Senators and St. Louis Browns in eleven seasons spanning 1911–1925, being also a member of the 1920 World Series Cleveland champion team.
- August 16 – Ty Tyson, 61, outfielder who played from 1926 through 1928 for the New York Giants and Brooklyn Robins.
- August 22 – Jim Tabor, 36, slugging third baseman for the Boston Red Sox and Philadelphia Phillies over nine seasons from 1938 to 1947; led the American League in assists in 1939 and putouts in 1942; collected four home runs, 11 runs batted in and 19 total bases in a 1939 doubleheader against the Philadelphia Athletics; three of his homers came in the second game, including a record-tying two grand slams in consecutive innings, while his 11 RBI is an American League record that remains intact as of 2019.
- August 25 – Charlie Maisel, 63, catcher who played in 1915 for the Baltimore Terrapins of the outlaw Federal League.
- August 27 – Charlie Shields, 73, pitcher who played in 1902 with the Baltimore Orioles and St. Louis Browns and for the St. Louis Cardinals in 1907.

=== September ===
- September 3 – Jack Pfiester, 75, pitcher for the Pittsburgh Pirates and Chicago Cubs over eight seasons between 1903 and 1911, who won two World Series with the Cubs in 1907–1908, led the National League with a 1.15 earned run average in 1907, winning 20 games in 1906 and posting a career record of 71–44, whose lifetime 2.02 ERA is the third best of all-time for MLB pitchers with at least 1,000 innings of work.
- September 4
  - Buck Herzog, 68, versatile infielder who played from 1908 through 1920 with four National League teams and also managed the Cincinnati Reds from 1914 to 1916, winning four NL pennants, while collecting 12 hits in the 1912 World Series to set a series record since then tied and broken.
  - Roy Van Graflan, 59, American League umpire from 1927 to 1933 who worked 1,034 AL games and two World Series; one of only six umpires who ever ejected Lou Gehrig from a game (July 1, 1929).
- September 11 – Bob Coulson, 66, outfielder for the Cincinnati Reds, Brooklyn Superbas/Dodgers and Pittsburgh Rebels in part of three seasons spanning 1908–1914.
- September 13 – Wese Callahan, 6s, shortstop for the 1913 St. Louis Cardinals.
- September 15 – Seth Sigsby, 79, 19th century pitcher who played in 1893 for the New York Giants.
- September 18 – Chub Aubrey, 72, shortstop who played for the Boston Beaneaters in its 1903 season.
- September 26 – Bill Cunningham, 59, outfielder who played from 1921 through 1924 for the Boston Braves and New York Giants, whose two-run single in the decisive game of the 1922 World Series sparked the Giants to a 5–3 victory over the New York Yankees at the Polo Grounds en route to the championship title.
- September 29 – Lefty Tyler, 63, pitcher who played with the Boston Doves/Rustlers/Braves clubs from 1910 to 1917 and for the Chicago Cubs from 1918 to 1921, being also a member of the famous Miracle Braves who swept the highly favored Philadelphia Athletics in the 1914 World Series.

=== October ===
- October 5 – Rags Faircloth, 61, pitcher who made two appearances for the Philadelphia Phillies in 1919.
- October 17 – Jim Delahanty, 74, one of five Delahanty brothers to play in the majors, a fine defensive second baseman who had a 13-year career with eight teams spanning 1901–1915, while batting a solid .283/.357/.373/.730 line and 1,159 hits in 1,186 career games.

=== November ===
- November 3 – John Chapman, 54, shortstop for the 1924 Philadelphia Athletics.
- November 6 – Tom Dougherty, 72, pitcher who made one-game relief appearance for the Chicago White Sox in 1904, who is probably unique in Major League Baseball history for his perfect 1–0 winning record in a game where he faced the minimum six batters over two innings, without giving up a run, hit or walk in his immaculate work.
- November 18 – Mike McCormick, 71, third baseman for the 1904 Brooklyn Superbas.
- November 19
  - Guy Lacy, 56, second baseman who played for the Cleveland Indians in its 1926 season.
  - Dutch Schesler, 53, German pitcher who appeared in 17 games for the Philadelphia Phillies in 1931.
- November 20 – Billy Maharg, 72, professional boxer that achieved three distinct historical connections with Major League Baseball, 1) as a replacement player in the 1912 Detroit Tigers' players strike, 2) for a one-game stint with the 1916 Philadelphia Phillies, and 3) because of his role in the 1919 Chicago Black Sox Scandal.

=== December ===
- December 7 – Slats Jordan, 75, utility man for the 1901–02 Baltimore Orioles.
- December 10 – Harry Armbruster, 71, backup outfielder for the Philadelphia Athletics in its 1906 season.
- December 13 – Klondike Douglass, 81, 19th century first baseman and catcher who played in the National League for the St. Louis Browns and Philadelphia Phillies in a span of nine seasons from 1896 to 1904.
- December 15 – Ed Barrow, 85, Hall of Fame executive and notable judge of talent, who discovered Honus Wagner in 1896 and later converted Babe Ruth from pitcher to outfielder, also signing contracts with Lou Gehrig, Joe DiMaggio, Lefty Gomez, Tony Lazzeri and Red Ruffing; as business/general manager and club president, oversaw the New York Yankees' dynasty that captured 14 American League pennants and ten World Series championships from 1921 to 1944, including five Series sweeps; earlier, served as field manager of 1903–1904 Detroit Tigers and 1918–1920 Boston Red Sox, leading 1918 Bosox to world championship
- December 17
  - Walt Devoy, 68, multi-sport athlete who played right field for the 1903 St. Louis Browns, playing also in the St. Louis Soccer League, where he later was an executive for the Ben Millers FC.
  - Lou McEvoy, 51, who made 34 pitching appearances for the New York Yankees from 1931 to 1932.
- December 24 – Pinch Thomas, 65, backup catcher whose nickname reflects his pinch-hitting abilities, as he posted a batting average of .419 (13-for-31) for the Boston Red Sox and Cleveland Indians from 1912 to 1921, while earning four World Series titles with Boston (1912; 1915–16) and Cleveland (1920).
- December 25 – Patsy Donovan, 88, Irish-American right fielder and manager who played for several teams over 17 years spanning 1890–1907, while managing five teams in 11 seasons from 1897 to 1911, collecting a .301 batting career average of .301 with 2,253 hits and 518 stolen bases, and a managerial record of 684–879 (.438).
