= Relief pitcher =

Baseball or softball pitcher that enters a game to pitch after a starting pitcher

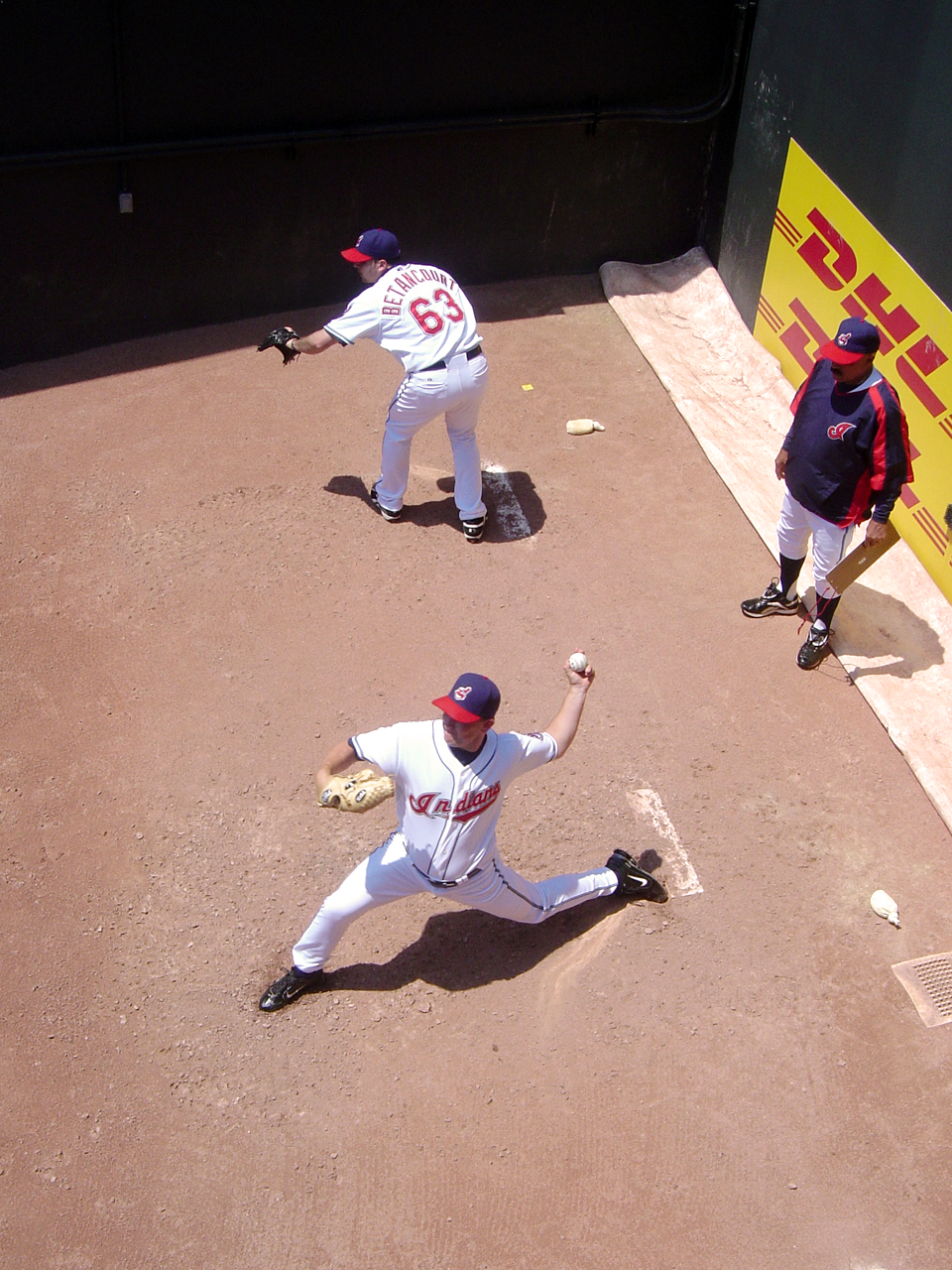
Cleveland Indians relief pitchers Aaron Fultz and Rafael Betancourt warming up in the bullpen at Jacobs Field in 2007

In baseball and softball, a relief pitcher or reliever is a pitcher who pitches in the game after the starting pitcher or another relief pitcher has been removed from the game because of fatigue, injury, ineffectiveness, ejection, high pitch count, or for other strategic reasons, such as inclement weather delays or pinch hitter substitutions. Relief pitchers are further divided informally into various roles, such as closers, setup men, middle relief pitchers, left/right-handed specialists, and long relievers. Whereas starting pitchers usually throw so many pitches in a single game that they must rest several days before pitching in another, relief pitchers are expected to be more flexible and typically pitch in more games with a shorter time period between pitching appearances but with fewer innings pitched per appearance. A team's staff of relievers is normally referred to metonymically as a team's bullpen, which refers to the area where the relievers sit during games, and where they warm up prior to entering the game.

== History ==
=== Pre-bullpen ===
In the early days of Major League Baseball (MLB), substituting a player was not allowed except for sickness or injury. An ineffective pitcher would switch positions with another player on the field. The first relief appearance in the major leagues was in 1876 with Boston Red Caps outfielder Jack Manning switching positions with pitcher Joe Borden. In this early era, relief pitchers changing from a position role to the pitcher's box in this way were often called "change" pitchers. This strategy of switching players between the mound and the outfield is still occasionally employed in modern baseball, sometimes in long extra inning games where a team is running out of players. In 1889, the first bullpen appearance occurred after rules were changed to allow a player substitution at any time. Early relief pitchers were normally starting pitchers pitching one or two innings in between starts. In 1903, during the second game of the inaugural World Series, Pittsburgh's Bucky Veil became the first relief pitcher in World Series history.

=== Early modern relievers/"firemen" ===
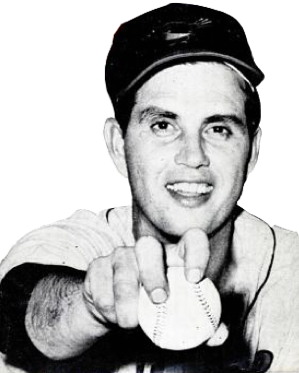
Hoyt Wilhelm won 124 games in relief, the major league record, and was the first pitcher to reach 200 saves and the first to appear in 1,000 games.

Firpo Marberry is credited with being the first prominent reliever. From 1923 to 1935, he pitched in 551 games, 364 of which were in relief. Baseball historian Bill James wrote that Marberry was "a modern reliever—a hard throwing young kid who worked strictly in relief, worked often, and was used to nail down victories". Another reliever, Johnny Murphy, became known as "Fireman" for his effectiveness when inserted into difficult situations ("put out fires") in relief.

Nonetheless, the full-time reliever who was entrusted with important situations was more the exception than the rule at this point. Often, a team's ace starting pitcher was used in between his starts to "close" games. Later research would reveal that Lefty Grove would have been in his league's top three in saves in four different seasons, had that stat been invented at the time.

Gradually after World War II, full-time relievers became more acceptable and standard. The relievers were usually pitchers that were not good enough to be starters. Relievers in the 1950s started to develop oddball pitches to distinguish them from starters. For example, Hoyt Wilhelm threw a knuckleball, and Elroy Face threw a forkball.

In 1969, the pitcher's mound was lowered and umpires were encouraged to call fewer strikes to give batters an advantage. Relief specialists were used to counter the increase in offense.

=== Closer era ===
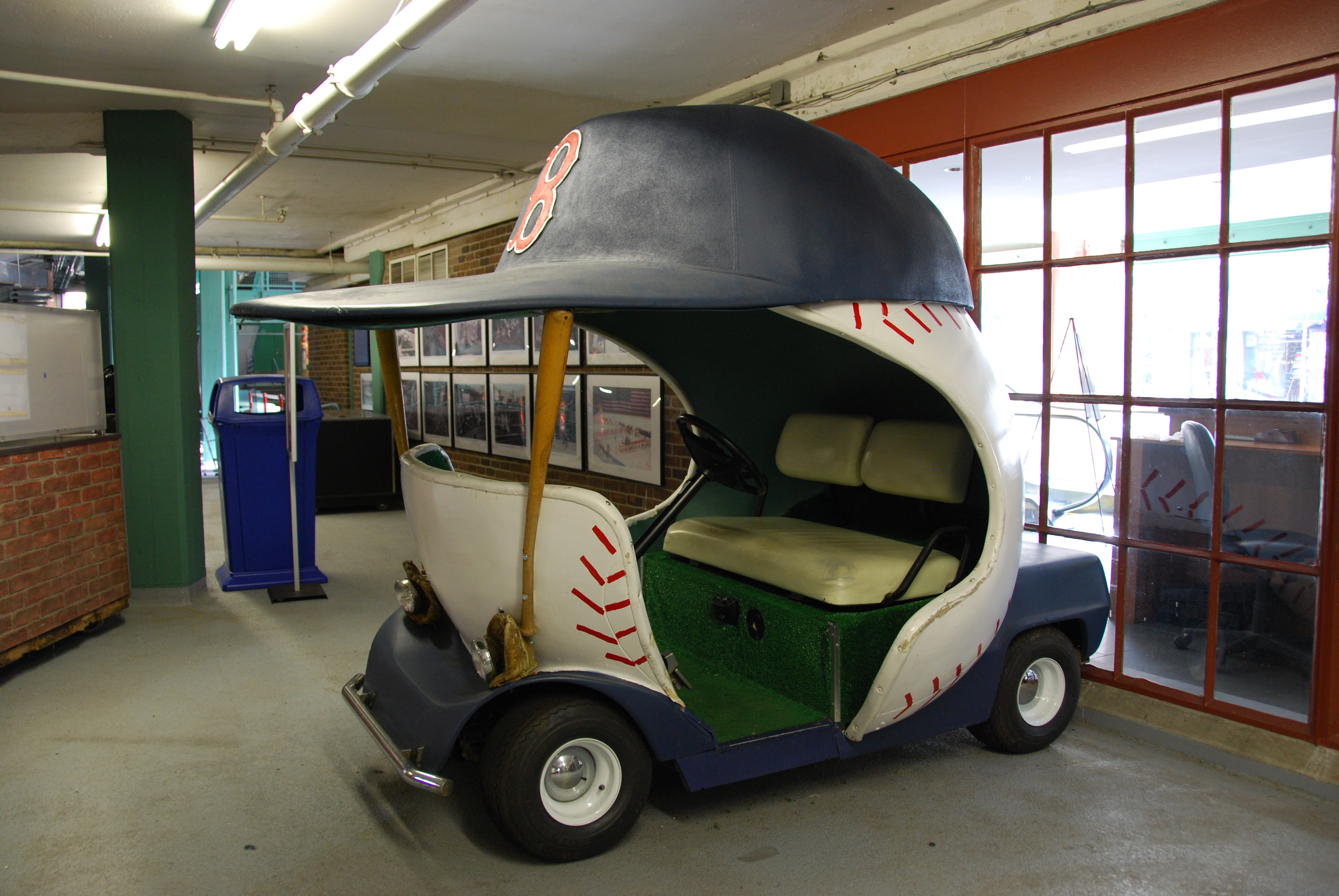
The bullpen car used by the Boston Red Sox to cart relievers into games

Relievers became more respected in the 1970s, and their pay increased due to free agency. All teams began having a closer. The 1980s were the first time in MLB that the number of saves outnumbered complete games. In 1995, there were nearly four saves for every complete game. It is unclear whether the specialization and reliance on relief pitchers led to pitch counts and fewer complete games, or whether pitch counts led to greater use of relievers.

As closers were reduced to one-inning specialists, setup men and middle relievers became more prominent.

In past decades, the relief pitcher was merely an ex-starter who came into a game upon the injury, ineffectiveness, or fatigue of the starting pitcher. The bullpen was for old starters who had lost the ability to throw effectively. Many of these pitchers would be able to flourish in this diminished role. Those such as Dennis Eckersley, as with many others, actually prolonged their tapering careers and often sparked them to new life. The added rest to their arms as well as the lessened exposure of their abilities became an advantage many would learn to capitalize on. Because these pitchers only faced some batters once a season, the opposing side would have greater difficulty preparing to face relief pitchers.

Recently, being a relief pitcher has become more of a career, rather than a reduced position. Many of today's top prospects are considered mainly for their relief pitching skills. In the quest for a managerial edge, managers as time goes on have carried more pitchers in the bullpen, and used them in more specialized situations. Acknowledgment of the platoon edge has prompted managers to ensure that opposing lefty hitters face as many lefty pitchers as possible, and that the same occur with respect to righty hitters and pitchers. Tony La Russa was particularly well known for making frequent pitching changes on this basis.

When Mike Marshall set the all-time record with 106 games pitched in 1974, he threw 208.1 innings. Currently, although some relievers still do appear in a large number of games per season, the workload for each individual pitcher has been much reduced. Since 2008, Pedro Feliciano has three of the top four seasons in games pitched, with 92, 88 and 86. However, Feliciano only averaged 58 innings pitched during those seasons. The last pitcher to throw 100 or more innings in a season without starting a game was Scott Proctor in 2006.

From the mid-2010s onward, MLB teams have given relievers an increasing number of innings at the expense of starters, due to the baseball game moving towards higher variance, and a flexible bullpen does give the manager more options of defending against high risk offensive strategies. In response, some teams have allocated funds and made trades to create a "super bullpen", nonetheless this is no guarantee of success since the performance of relief pitchers has been shown to fluctuate much more wildly than starting pitchers. For instance the 2016 and 2017 Cleveland Indians had the strongest bullpen in the league, however their bullpen in 2018 struggled and the Indians won their division thanks to the strength of their starting rotation. Similarly the 2019 Washington Nationals won the 2019 World Series in spite of their relief pitching staff having the worst ERA (5.66) that season.

== Current relief roles ==
Pitching staffs on MLB teams have grown from 9 or 10 to as many as 12 or 13 pitchers, due to the increased importance of relief pitching. The staff generally consists of five starting pitchers, with the remaining pitchers assigned as relievers. A team's relief staff usually contains a closer who generally pitches the ninth inning, a setup pitcher who generally pitches the eighth, and a left-handed specialist whose job is to retire left-handed batters. The rest of the bullpen then consists of middle relievers who are used in the remaining situations, and perhaps additional left-handed or right-handed specialists.

The closer is usually the best relief pitcher, followed by the setup man. Players typically get promoted into later-inning roles as they succeed. Relievers were previously more multipurpose before becoming one-inning specialists.

The setup man and closer will normally only be used to preserve a lead, although they may enter to maintain a close game (where the score is tied or if their team is trailing by only a few runs) particularly in the playoffs. If the team is significantly behind going into the eighth or ninth inning and a relief pitcher is required, usually a middle reliever or two will be chosen to soak up innings, while the setup man and closer are saved for the next time they are needed to preserve a win. The proper use of the bullpen is to avoid using an effective reliever on a low-leverage situation, instead saving them as "fireman" for high-leverage situations (such as bases-loaded, no-outs).

In 2018, some MLB teams began experimenting with an opener – a pitcher who is normally a reliever that starts the game for an inning or two before yielding to someone who would normally be a starter. Sometimes the manager replaces an opener with a series of other relievers who would only pitch one or two innings in a game, usually due to injury or fatigue affecting the team's starters or other strategical reasons; this approach became known as a bullpen game. One advantage of this approach is that the opener, who is often a hard-throwing specialist, can be called in to face the most dangerous hitters, who are usually near the top of the batting order, the first time they come to bat. Although the opener has only been formally regarded as a relief role in 2018, managers have sporadically used a reliever before a starter. A good example is Game 6 of the 1990 National League Championship Series when Pittsburgh Pirates manager Jim Leyland started a set-up man, Ted Power, in order to keep the Cincinnati Reds from employing their successful platoon (Power pitched 2 1/3 innings prior to giving way to lefty starter Zane Smith in the third inning) and the strategy worked in holding the Reds to only two runs; to deceive his opponents Leyland had announced the Game 6 starter at a press conference so that the Reds would set their batting order around Smith.

== Starting pitchers as relievers ==
Between their scheduled starts in the rotation, a starting pitcher can be used on short rest for the bullpen. They are sometimes used as relievers when the stakes are higher, such as a game that could decide the division title or an elimination (winner-take all) playoff game. Currently, starters are typically used in relief situations either early in the postseason prior to their scheduled rotation start, or late in the postseason after their last scheduled start (often with "the ultimatum of a series clincher"). However, the 2018 Boston Red Sox under Alex Cora managed their pitching rotation such that a starter was readily available in the bullpen every playoff game.

Regarded as an "almost universal truth in baseball", "almost every starting pitcher would be better in relief". However, a starter may not necessarily be best used as a "fireman" (to stop a rally) since "the conventional wisdom is that it’s unwise to bring a starter in for a relief appearance with men already on base; starting pitchers take longer to warm up than relievers and tend to be most comfortable when coming in at the start of an inning with the bases empty".

A good example of starters in relief was in the deciding Game 6 of the 2010 NLCS, where the San Francisco Giants bullpen utilized two starters as well as three regular relievers to get seven scoreless innings. In Game 6 of the 2010 ALCS, manager Joe Girardi was criticized for "managing by formula" in not calling upon ace CC Sabathia and instead going to reliever David Robertson who surrendered several runs that put the game out of reach for the New York Yankees.

Starter Madison Bumgarner recorded the longest save in World Series history, pitching five scoreless innings of relief in a Game 7 3–2 victory of the 2014 edition. In the 2018 World Series, starter Nathan Eovaldi, originally slated to pitch Game 4, was inserted in relief during Game 3 which turned into an 18-inning marathon. In making World Series history, he became the first reliever to throw at least six innings after Rick Rhoden did so in 1977, while Eovaldi's 97 pitches set the record for the most by a reliever (and also 36 more pitches than Rick Porcello who had started that game).

In the clinching Games of the 2018 NLCS and 2018 World Series, respectively, aces Clayton Kershaw (for Kenley Jansen) and Chris Sale (for Craig Kimbrel, indeed the other pitcher warming up besides Sale was another starter, Nathan Eovaldi) pitched the ninth-inning in lieu of their team's regular closer. Neither relief entrance was a high pressure situation as their teams were already leading 5-1 entering the 9th; but it gave Sale the opportunity to get the final outs of the series (Sale also got the first outs of the series when he started the opener).

== Position players as relievers ==
In games where a blowout is occurring, position players (non-pitchers) may be substituted in to pitch to save the bullpen for the next game. However, this is a rare occurrence as position players are not truly trained as pitchers, and tend to throw with less velocity and/or accuracy. There is also the increased risk of injury, such as Jose Canseco who suffered a season-ending arm injury after pitching two innings in a 1993 game. For these reasons, managers will typically only use a position player as a pitcher in a blowout loss, or in order to avoid a forfeit once they have run out of available pitchers. Typically, the position player also pitched at the high school or collegiate level, as smaller roster sizes at amateur levels forced some position players to pitch, with some were recruited in college also as pitchers, as starters or relievers. Mitch Moreland (Mississippi State), Ryan Rua (Lake Erie College), and J. D. Davis, (Cal State Fullerton) all played as both position players and pitchers in their collegiate careers, with Rua and Davis both being closers for their college teams.

Cliff Pennington became the first position player in Major League Baseball history to pitch in a postseason game, which was during Game 4 of the 2015 American League Championship Series. The second position player to pitch in the playoffs was Austin Romine during Game 3 of the 2018 American League Division Series.

Starting in 2023, MLB position players are allowed to pitch in a game under the following conditions:

- The leading team can only use a position player in this role in the ninth inning, and with a lead of at least 10 runs.
- A team behind by eight or more runs can use a position player to pitch at any time in the game.
- The use of position players as pitchers in extra innings is unrestricted.

== Awards given to relievers ==
The Major League Baseball Reliever of the Year Award and The Sporting News Reliever of the Year Award are annually voted on and presented to relievers, with the former being split by league into the "Trevor Hoffman NL Reliever of the Year Award" and the "Mariano Rivera AL Reliever of the Year Award". The former equivalent award for both leagues combined until 2012, the Rolaids Relief Man Award, was determined by a statistical formula.

Compared to starting pitchers, most relievers (with the except of closers with large save totals) receive few awards and honors. Historically, setup men were rarely selected to MLB All-Star Games, with the relievers selected usually being closers. A setup man has never won the Cy Young Award or the Major League Baseball Most Valuable Player Award; the highest placements in these respective awards have been achieved by Rivera, who finished third in the voting for the American League (AL) Cy Young Award and twelfth for the AL MVP in 1996, and for the next season he was promoted to closer. Middle reliever Andrew Miller became the first relief pitcher other than a closer to win a League Championship Series Most Valuable Player Award when he was voted the 2016 ALCS MVP.

Setup pitchers typically make less than the MLB average salary. Relief pitchers further down the line may be journeymen as their individual performances may vary greatly (often specialised to pitch against certain types of batters, such as to right-handed batters only or left-handed batters only), even though their team's relief pitching staff as a whole is overall effective.

The rising importance placed on relief pitchers is evident in the rising star power of the closer. It has gotten to the point where closers are among the biggest stars in the game, with status and salaries on par with starting pitchers. When closers play at home, and when they are called into the game to preserve a lead for the crucial last inning or those last couple of outs, many of them trot in from the bullpen to the pitchers mound accompanied by a theme song of their choice. For many years with the Yankees, Rivera entered the game accompanied by Metallica's "Enter Sandman" booming over Yankee Stadium's sound system. When Jonathan Papelbon was with the Red Sox, his entry song was the Dropkick Murphys' "I'm Shipping Up to Boston", and Hoffman entered to the tune of AC/DC's "Hells Bells".

Nine pitchers are currently in the Baseball Hall of Fame chiefly for their accomplishments as relief pitchers: Hoyt Wilhelm, Rollie Fingers, Dennis Eckersley, Bruce Sutter, Goose Gossage, Trevor Hoffman, Lee Smith, Mariano Rivera, and Billy Wagner. Eckersley, who was considered the first modern closer pitching exclusively in ninth inning situations, also had a significant career as a starting pitcher and even threw a no-hitter in 1977. Another pitcher entering the Hall in 2015, John Smoltz, was primarily a starter, but spent four seasons as a reliever.

Jim Konstanty in 1950 was the first reliever to win the MLB MVP Award after a then-record 74 games, 16–7 record, 22 saves, and a 2.66 ERA. Mike Marshall in 1974 was the first reliever to win the Cy Young Award after a record 106 games, 15–12 record, 21 saves, and 208 innings pitched. In 1992, Eckersley was the first modern closer (first player to be used almost exclusively in ninth inning situations) to win the Cy Young, and since then only one other relief pitcher has won the Cy Young, Éric Gagné in 2003 (also a closer). Three relief pitchers have won both the MVP and Cy Young Awards in a single season; Fingers in 1981, Willie Hernández in 1984, and Eckersley in 1992.

Relievers who have won the Rookie of the Year Award
Year	League	Player	Team
1976	National	Butch Metzger	San Diego Padres
1980	National	Steve Howe	Los Angeles Dodgers
1986	National	Todd Worrell	St. Louis Cardinals
1989	American	Gregg Olson	Baltimore Orioles
1999	National	Scott Williamson	Cincinnati Reds
2000	American	Kazuhiro Sasaki	Seattle Mariners
2005	American	Huston Street	Oakland Athletics
2009	American	Andrew Bailey	Oakland Athletics
2010	American	Neftalí Feliz	Texas Rangers
2011	National	Craig Kimbrel	Atlanta Braves
2020	National	Devin Williams	Milwaukee Brewers

Relievers who have won the Cy Young Award
Year	League	Player	Team
1974	National	Mike Marshall	Los Angeles Dodgers
1977	American	Sparky Lyle	New York Yankees
1979	National	Bruce Sutter	Chicago Cubs
1981	American	Rollie Fingers	Milwaukee Brewers
1984	American	Willie Hernández	Detroit Tigers
1987	National	Steve Bedrosian	Philadelphia Phillies
1989	National	Mark Davis	San Diego Padres
1992	American	Dennis Eckersley	Oakland Athletics
2003	National	Éric Gagné	Los Angeles Dodgers

Relievers who have won the Major League Baseball Most Valuable Player Award
Year	League	Player	Team
1950	National	Jim Konstanty	Philadelphia Phillies
1981	American	Rollie Fingers	Milwaukee Brewers
1984	American	Willie Hernández	Detroit Tigers
1992	American	Dennis Eckersley	Oakland Athletics

== See also ==
- 300 save club
- Hold
- This Year in Baseball Awards (including Starting Pitcher, Setup Pitcher, and Closer)
