= Inside-the-park home run =

Type of scoring play in baseball

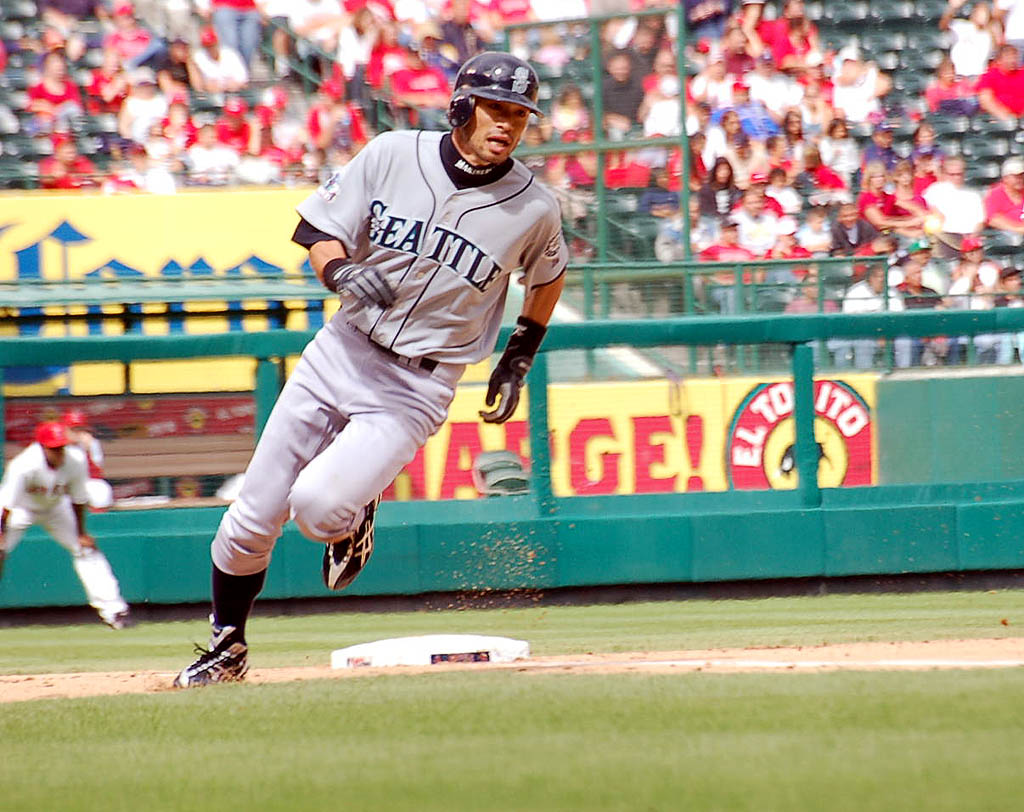
In 2007, Ichiro Suzuki became the first, and only, player to record an inside-the-park home run during an MLB All-Star Game.

In baseball, an inside-the-park home run is a rare play in which a batter rounds all four bases for a home run without the baseball leaving the field of play. It is also known as an "inside-the-parker", "in-the-park home run", or "in-the-park homer".

== Discussion ==
The vast majority of home runs occur when a batter hits the ball beyond the outfield fence on the fly, which requires striking the ball with enough power at the correct flight angle to clear the outfield, allowing the batter to trot around the bases at leisure. Though an inside-the-park home run is scored in the same manner, achieving the feat requires the batter to touch all four bases before being tagged out by an opposing player, all while the ball remains in play.

Inside-the-park home runs typically occur when a fast baserunner either hits the ball to the portion of the field farthest from where the opposing team's fielders are positioned or when a sharply hit ball takes an unexpected bounce away from defenders. They can also be the result of weather conditions like wind gusts or fog that reduce defenders' ability to track a moving ball. Sometimes (such as Alcides Escobar's inside-the-park homer in the 2015 World Series), an outfielder could lose sight of the ball in the stadium floodlights or against a light-colored roof of a domed stadium. Since a play is usually not ruled an error unless a fielder touches the ball, these scenarios can result in a home run if the batter is able to circle the bases before the defenders can track down the ball and get it to home plate.

If the defensive team is charged with an error on the play, the batter is not credited with a home run, but rather as having advanced on an error. At advanced levels of play, a batter scoring due to one or more errors by the defense is colloquially referred to as a Little League home run.

Though never an everyday occurrence, inside-the-park homers were more common in the early days of Major League Baseball. As there was no standard shape or size of the outfield, and many early ballparks featured outfields that were large, irregular, or contained odd angles in the outfield wall to accommodate the size of the property on which they were situated. This could result in a batted ball getting past outfielders to the far reaches of the playing field or bouncing off a wall in an unexpected direction, forcing defensive players to chase after it while the batter sprints around the bases. The smaller and more circumferential outfields of the modern baseball era reduce opportunities for the ball to take odd bounces, helping to reduce the number of inside-the-park homers while increasing the number of "regular" homers. Today, inside-the-park homers are rare, generally totaling ten to twenty per season.

== Major League Baseball statistics ==
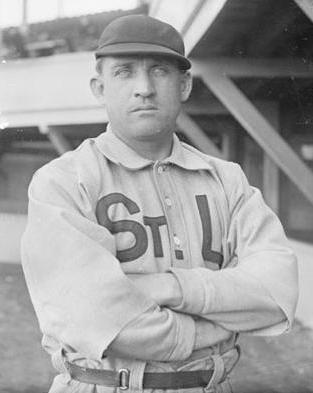
Jesse Burkett

Of the 154,483 home runs hit between 1951 and 2000, only 975 (0.63%; about one per 158) were inside-the-park. The percentage has dwindled since the increase in emphasis on power hitting, which began in the 1920s. Jesse Burkett, who played in the major leagues from 1890 to 1905, had 55 career inside-the-park home runs (of 75 career home runs). The leader in the live-ball era is Willie Wilson, who played in the major leagues from 1976 to 1994 and hit 13 inside-the-park home runs (of 41 career home runs).

=== Records ===
| League | Single game | | | Single season | | | Career | |
| League | Player | No. | Date | Player | No. | Year | Player | No. |
|---|---|---|---|---|---|---|---|---|
| American League | 17 players tied most recent: Greg Gagne | 2 | October 4, 1986 | Ty Cobb | 9 | 1909 | Ty Cobb | 46 |
| National League | Tom McCreery | 3 | July 12, 1897 | Sam Crawford | 12 | 1901 | Tommy Leach | 49 |
| Major League Baseball | Tom McCreery | 3 | July 12, 1897 | Sam Crawford | 12 | 1901 | Jesse Burkett | 55 |

=== In the World Series ===
| Date | Game | Player | Team | Opponent |
|---|---|---|---|---|
| October 1, 1903 | 1 | Jimmy Sebring | Pittsburgh Pirates | Boston Americans |
| October 2, 1903 | 2 | Patsy Dougherty | Boston Americans | Pittsburgh Pirates |
| October 13, 1915 | 5 | Duffy Lewis | Boston Red Sox | Philadelphia Phillies |
| October 9, 1916 | 2 | Hy Myers | Brooklyn Robins | Boston Red Sox |
| October 11, 1916 | 4 | Larry Gardner | Boston Red Sox | Brooklyn Robins |
| October 10, 1923 | 1 | Casey Stengel | New York Giants | New York Yankees |
| October 3, 1926 | 2 | Tommy Thevenow | St. Louis Cardinals | New York Yankees |
| October 7, 1928 | 3 | Lou Gehrig | New York Yankees | St. Louis Cardinals |
| October 12, 1929 | 4 | Mule Haas | Philadelphia Athletics | Chicago Cubs |
| October 27, 2015 | 1 | Alcides Escobar | Kansas City Royals | New York Mets |

=== Rare occurrences ===
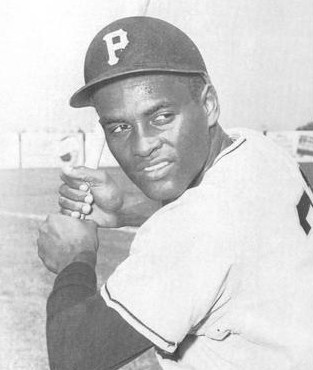
Roberto Clemente

- On July 13, 1896, Ed Delahanty of the Philadelphia Phillies hit four home runs in one game (itself an extraordinarily rare feat), two of which were inside-the-park home runs. This event was the only time any homers in a four-homer game were inside-the-park.
- On April 27, 1949, Pete Milne hit an inside-the-park grand slam for his only career home run. It gave the New York Giants an 11–8 lead over the Brooklyn Dodgers, which was also the final score.
- On July 25, 1956, Roberto Clemente became the only MLB player to hit a walk-off inside-the-park grand slam in a 9–8 Pittsburgh Pirates win over the Chicago Cubs, at Forbes Field.
- On August 27, 1977, Texas Rangers teammates Toby Harrah and Bump Wills hit back-to-back inside-the-park home runs.
- On June 12, 1986, Kelly Gruber of the Toronto Blue Jays had a three-run inside-the-park homer against the visiting Detroit Tigers, facilitated by the foggy weather and the proximity of Exhibition Stadium to Lake Ontario. The Tigers outfielders lost sight of a routine fly ball and the ball landed behind the defenders. By the time the ball was located, Gruber was able to complete his circumnavigation of the bases before the ball was thrown back to the infield.
- On October 4, 1986, during a Twins' home game at the Hubert H. Humphrey Metrodome, Greg Gagne tied a modern-era major league record by hitting two inside-the-park home runs against the Chicago White Sox. Gagne was just the second major league player to perform this feat since 1950. Both home runs were hit off Chicago starting pitcher Floyd Bannister, who also tied a modern-era major league record by allowing two inside-the-park home runs in one game. The Twins went on to win the game, 7–3.
- On June 17, 2007, Prince Fielder of the Milwaukee Brewers hit a popup to center field that became an inside-the-park home run when Minnesota Twins outfielder Lew Ford lost the ball after it struck a speaker on the ceiling of the Metrodome. On June 19, 2008, he hit another inside-the-park-homer at Miller Park in Milwaukee, in the 5th inning, versus A.J. Burnett of the Toronto Blue Jays.
- On July 10, 2007, Ichiro Suzuki became the first and only player to hit an inside-the-park home run in the All-Star Game hitting it at AT&T Park in San Francisco. Suzuki, playing in the American League's 5 to 4 win, was the game's MVP.
- On April 6, 2009, Emilio Bonifacio of the Florida Marlins became the first player in 41 years to hit an inside-the-park home run on Opening Day, which was also the first home run of Bonifacio's major league career.
- On July 18, 2010, Jhonny Peralta of the Cleveland Indians hit a three-run inside-the-park home run when Detroit Tigers outfielder Ryan Raburn crashed through the bullpen fence while trying to catch the ball. Peralta was one of the slowest runners then on the Indians' roster and would be traded to the Tigers ten days later. He took 16.74 seconds to round the bases, which was, at that point in the 2010 season, the slowest of any inside-the-park home run and slower than five regular home run trots.
- On May 25, 2013, Ángel Pagán of the San Francisco Giants hit an inside-the-park home run at AT&T Park in San Francisco against the Colorado Rockies. It was a tenth inning, two-run walk-off home run, with teammate Brandon Crawford on base. It was the first walk-off inside-the-park home run since 2004, when Rey Sanchez of the Devil Rays hit one, also in the bottom of the tenth inning, also against the Rockies, albeit in a tie game.
- On July 8, 2015, Logan Forsythe of the Tampa Bay Rays hit an inside-the-park home run in the 4th inning against the Kansas City Royals when, in attempting to field the ball, Royals left fielder Alex Gordon injured his groin. Gordon was replaced by Jarrod Dyson, who hit an inside-the-park home run of his own in the 6th inning of the game. Dyson's hit went past Rays left fielder David DeJesus, who, like Gordon, had been injured five years earlier, on July 22, 2010, while playing for the Royals on a play that led to an inside-the-park home run for Derek Jeter.
- On September 2, 2015, Rubén Tejada of the New York Mets hit the ball down the right-field foul line, under the glove of Philadelphia Phillies outfielder Domonic Brown who, running full speed, crashed into and flipped over a short wall on the side of the playing field. While Brown was shaken up in the first row, the ball rolled out to the right field fence in Citi Field, where Phillies second baseman Cesar Hernández finally retrieved it, though it was too late to prevent Tejada from rounding the bases. Brown later left the game with concussion-like symptoms. At 74.5 mph off the bat, it was the softest-hit home run of the season to that point.
- On October 27, 2015, Alcides Escobar of the Kansas City Royals hit an inside-the-park home run in Game 1 of the 2015 World Series. It was the first in a World Series game since Mule Haas in the 1929 World Series and the first hit by a leadoff batter since Patsy Dougherty did it for the Boston Americans (now Red Sox) in 1903.
- During the regionals for the 2022 College World Series, Louisiana Tech Bulldog catcher Jorge Corona hit a high fly ball to center field in a bases-loaded situation, with the Dallas Baptist Patriot centerfielder losing the ball in the lights of UFCU Disch–Falk Field, it bouncing well behind him to the wall and Corona easily clearing the bases standing up for an inside-the-park grand slam.
- On July 22, 2022, Raimel Tapia of the Toronto Blue Jays hit a high fly ball to center field with 2 outs and the bases loaded against the Boston Red Sox at Fenway Park. Jarren Duran, the center fielder, lost sight of the ball in Fenway's lights and it landed far behind him on the warning track, allowing Tapia to easily clear the bases giving him an inside-the-park grand slam. Toronto went on to score a franchise-record 28 runs in the game.
- On October 15, 2022, J. T. Realmuto of the Philadelphia Phillies hit an inside-the-park home run at Citizens Bank Park during a playoff game against the Atlanta Braves, becoming the first catcher to do so in postseason history.
- On August 8, 2023, Stuart Fairchild of the Cincinnati Reds hit a fly ball to right field with no outs in the 5th inning against the Miami Marlins at Great American Ball Park. Jesús Sánchez, the right fielder could not make the catch in foul territory and the ball landed against the wall and ran into the corner, Fairchild made the turn at 3rd base while a throw came in that bounced out of the catcher's glove, allowing Fairchild to dive over the catcher and make the play at home.
- On May 5, 2025, Matt Olson of the Atlanta Braves recorded an inside-the-park home run when he hit a fly ball to deep left field and Tyler Callihan (Cincinnati Reds) broke his wrist after diving into the wall in attempt to catch it.
- On July 8, 2025, Lawrence Butler of the Athletics hit a lead-off inside-the-park home run against Didier Fuentes of the Atlanta Braves, while Patrick Bailey of the San Francisco Giants hit a walk-off inside-the-park home run against Jordan Romano of the Philadelphia Phillies, marking the first time in MLB history where both lead-off and walk-off inside-the-park home runs were hit on the same day. Patrick Bailey's walk-off inside-the-park home run also marked the first walk-off inside-the-park home run by a catcher since Bennie Tate hit an extra innings walk-off inside-the-park home run for the Washington Senators in the second game of a doubleheader against Sad Sam Jones of the New York Yankees on August 11, 1926.
- On April 21, 2026, Sam Antonacci of the White Sox hit his first career home run after the Arizona Diamondbacks ball boy deflected the fair ball that had rolled into foul territory. Lourdes Gurriel Jr. assumed the play was dead and didn't attempt to field the ball, giving Antonacci time to reach home. The home run stood because there was no interference call on the play, so no challenge was allowed.
- On May 19, 2026, James Wood of the Nationals hit an inside-the-park grand slam after the Mets left fielder Nick Morabito collided with the wall while center fielder Tyrone Taylor believed Morabito had caught the ball.
