= Leo Durocher =

American baseball player and manager (1905–1991)

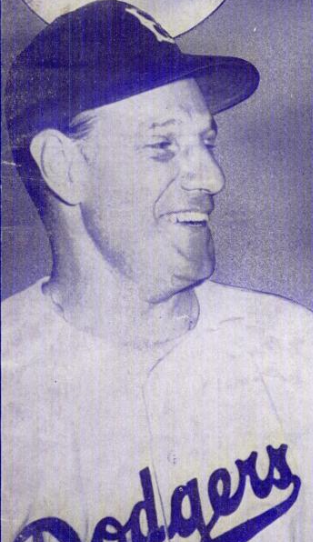
- Durocher in 1948
- Shortstop / Manager
- Born: July 27, 1905; West Springfield, Massachusetts, U.S.
- Died: October 7, 1991 (aged 86); Palm Springs, California, U.S.
- Batted: Right Threw: Right

MLB debut
- October 2, 1925, for the New York Yankees

Last MLB appearance
- April 18, 1945, for the Brooklyn Dodgers

MLB statistics
- Batting average: .247
- Home runs: 24
- Runs batted in: 567
- Managerial record: 2,008–1,709–22
- Winning %: .540
- Stats at Baseball Reference
- Managerial record at Baseball Reference

Teams
- As player: New York Yankees (1925, 1928–1929); Cincinnati Reds (1930–1933); St. Louis Cardinals (1933–1937); Brooklyn Dodgers (1938–1941, 1943, 1945); As manager: Brooklyn Dodgers (1939–1946, 1948); New York Giants (1948–1955); Chicago Cubs (1966–1972); Houston Astros (1972–1973); As coach: Los Angeles Dodgers (1961–1964)

Career highlights and awards
- 3× All-Star (1936, 1938, 1940); 4× World Series champion (1928, 1934, 1954, 1963); Chicago Cubs Hall of Fame

Member of the National

Baseball Hall of Fame
- Induction: 1994
- Election method: Veterans Committee

Leo Ernest Durocher (French spelling Léo Ernest Durocher) (/dəˈroʊ.ʃər/; July 27, 1905 – October 7, 1991), nicknamed "Leo the Lip" and "Lippy", was an American professional baseball player, manager, and coach. He played in Major League Baseball (MLB) as an infielder. Upon his retirement, he ranked fifth all-time among managers with 2,008 career victories, second only to John McGraw in National League history. Durocher still ranks thirteenth in career wins by a manager. A controversial and outspoken character, Durocher's half-century in baseball was dogged by clashes with authority, the baseball commissioner, the press, and umpires; his 100 career ejections as a manager trailed only McGraw when he retired, and he still ranks third on the all-time list. He won three National League pennants and one world championship. In 25 years as a manager, Durocher had only 4 losing seasons.

Durocher was posthumously elected to the Baseball Hall of Fame in 1994.

== Early life ==
Leo Ernest Durocher was born on July 27, 1905, in West Springfield, Massachusetts, the youngest of four sons born to French Canadian parents. His mother was a hotel maid, and his father was a railroad engineer. His parents were immigrants from Quebec, and both they and Durocher's older brothers spoke only French; Durocher began attending elementary school without knowing how to speak English.

The Durochers lived only two blocks from Rabbit Maranville, who taught Durocher the game of baseball and gave him a glove. Durocher became a good athlete while in high school and was offered a scholarship to Holy Cross, but was suspended from school after he hit a teacher, and never returned. Durocher became a prominent semi-professional athlete, with several Springfield-area employers competing to have him play on their company teams.

== Professional career ==
=== Minor leagues ===
After being scouted by the New York Yankees, Durocher broke into professional baseball with the Hartford Senators of the Eastern League in 1925.

=== New York Yankees (1925, 1928–1929) ===
Durocher was called up to the Yankees and played in two games. Durocher spent two more seasons in the minors, playing for the Atlanta Crackers of the Southern Association in 1926 and St. Paul Saints of the American Association in 1927.

Durocher rejoined the Yankees in 1928. A regular player, he was nicknamed "The All-American Out" by Babe Ruth. Durocher was a favorite of Yankee manager Miller Huggins, who considered Durocher a potential managerial candidate for his competitiveness, passion, ego, and facility for remembering situations. Durocher's outspokenness did not endear him to Yankee ownership, however, and his habit of passing bad checks to finance his expensive tastes in clothes and nightlife annoyed Yankee general manager Ed Barrow.

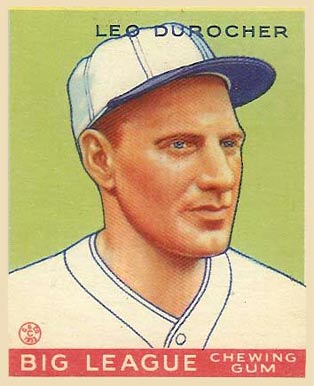
Durocher's 1933 Goudey baseball card

Durocher helped the team win their second consecutive World Series title in 1928, then demanded a raise.

=== Cincinnati Reds (1930–1933) ===
Durocher was later sold to the Cincinnati Reds on February 5, 1930. Durocher spent the remainder of his professional career in the National League.

=== St. Louis Cardinals (1933–1937) ===
After playing three seasons with the Reds, Durocher was traded to the St. Louis Cardinals in mid-1933. Upon joining the Cardinals, he was assigned uniform number 2, which he wore for the rest of his career, as player, coach, and manager. That team, whose famous nickname "Gashouse Gang" was supposedly inspired by Durocher, were a far more appropriate match for him; in St. Louis, Durocher's characteristics as a fiery player and vicious bench jockey were given full rein. Durocher remained with the Cardinals through the 1937 season, captaining the team and winning the 1934 World Series (their third title in nine years) before being traded to the Brooklyn Dodgers.

=== Brooklyn Dodgers (1938–1941, 1943, 1945) ===
Primarily a shortstop, Durocher played through 1945, though his last year as a regular was 1939; after that year he never played more than 62 games in a season. He was known as a solid fielder but a poor hitter. In 5,350 career at bats, he batted .247, hit 24 home runs, and had 567 runs batted in.

Durocher was named to the NL's All-Star team three times, once with St. Louis and twice with the Dodgers. In the 1938 game in Cincinnati, Durocher hit the only Little League home run in All-Star Game history.

Also in 1938, Durocher made history of a sort by making the final out in Johnny Vander Meer's second consecutive no-hitter.

== Managerial career ==
=== Brooklyn Dodgers (1939–1946, 1948) ===
After the 1938 season—Durocher's first year as Brooklyn's starting shortstop—he was appointed player-manager by the Dodgers' new president and general manager, Larry MacPhail. The two were a successful and combustible combination. MacPhail spared no expense in purchasing and trading for useful players (and sometimes outright stars), such as Dolph Camilli, Billy Herman, and Kirby Higbe. He also purchased shortstop Pee Wee Reese from the Boston Red Sox. By the middle of the 1940 season, Reese impressed Durocher enough that he gave up his spot as the regular shortstop so Reese could get a chance to play, though Durocher would make "cameo" appearances in the lineup in 1943 and 1945. Other major purchases by MacPhail included another young star, Pete Reiser, when he was ruled a free agent from the Cardinals' farm system. MacPhail found stalwarts such as American League veterans Dixie Walker and Whitlow Wyatt off the waiver wire.

In his first season as player-manager, Durocher came into his own. The most enduring image of Durocher is of him standing toe-to-toe with an umpire, vehemently arguing his case until his inevitable ejection from the game. Durocher's fiery temper and willingness to scrap came to epitomize the position for which he was to become most famous. As manager he valued these same traits in his players. His philosophy was best expressed in the phrase for which he is best, albeit inaccurately, remembered: "Nice guys finish last" (Durocher's actual phrasing "Nice guys, finish last" was a pair of clause fragments describing a team). Durocher once said, "Look at Mel Ott over there. He's a nice guy, and he finishes second. Now look at the Brat (Eddie Stanky). He can't hit, can't run, can't field. He's no nice guy, but all the little son-of-a-bitch can do is win."

Durocher was also notorious for ordering his pitchers to hit batters. Whenever he wanted a batter hit, he would yell, "Stick it in his ear!"

In 1939 the Dodgers were coming off six straight losing seasons, but Durocher led a quick turnaround. In 1941, his third season as manager, he led the Dodgers to a 100–54 record and the National League pennant, their first in 21 years. In the 1941 World Series the Dodgers lost to the Yankees in five games. They bettered their record in 1942, winning 104 games but just missing out on winning a second consecutive pennant.

Despite all the success of his first three years, Durocher and MacPhail had a tempestuous relationship. MacPhail was a notorious drinker and was as hot-tempered as his manager. He often fired Durocher in the midst of a night of drinking. The following morning, however, MacPhail inevitably hired Durocher back. Finally, at the end of the 1942 season, MacPhail's tenure with the Dodgers came to an end when he resigned to rejoin the United States Army. His replacement, former Cardinal boss Branch Rickey, retained Durocher as skipper. Durocher managed the Dodgers continuously through 1946 (having ceased as a player during the 1945 season) and led Brooklyn to the first postseason NL playoff series in history, which they lost to the Cardinals, two games to none.

Durocher also clashed regularly with Commissioner Albert "Happy" Chandler. Chandler, who had been named to the post in 1945, warned Durocher to stay away from some of his old friends who were gamblers or bookmakers or had mob connections, and who had a free rein at Ebbets Field. Durocher was particularly close with actor George Raft, with whom he shared a Los Angeles house, and he admitted to a nodding acquaintance with Bugsy Siegel.

Durocher, who encouraged and participated in card schools within the clubhouse, was something of a pool shark himself and a friend to many pool hustlers. He also followed horse racing closely. Matters came to a head when Durocher's affair with married actress Laraine Day became public knowledge, drawing criticism from Brooklyn's influential Catholic Youth Organization. The two later eloped and married in Texas in 1947. In the 1950s, Day hosted a radio program called Day with the Giants and later authored a book by the same title describing the life of a manager's wife.

=== Nice guys finish last ===
The saying "nice guys finish last" is a condensation by journalists of a quotation by Durocher—he did not originally say this himself, though it has often been attributed to him, and he did appropriate it as his own. The original quotation was "The nice guys are all over there, in seventh place" (July 6, 1946) about the 1946 New York Giants—seventh place was next to last place in the National League. This was shortly afterwards rendered as "'Nice Guys' Wind Up in Last Place, Scoffs Lippy", thence its present form.

In his autobiography, Nice Guys Finish Last (1975), Durocher quoted himself incorrectly, 29 years afterward, as his sayings were contradicted by the contemporary records (see references above), although they show his philosophy, as epitomized in this maxim:

The Giants, led by Mel Ott, began to come out of their dugout to take their warm-up. Without missing a beat, I said, "Take a look at that Number Four there. A nicer guy never drew breath than that man there." I called off his players' names as they came marching up the steps behind him, "Walker Cooper, Mize, Marshall, Kerr, Gordon, Thomson. Take a look at them. All nice guys. They'll finish last. Nice guys. Finish last." I said, "They lose a ball game, they go home, they have a nice dinner, they put their heads down on the pillow and go to sleep. Poor Mel Ott, he can't sleep at night. He wants to win; he's got a job to do for the owner of the ball club. But that doesn't concern the players, they're all getting good money." I said, "you surround yourself with this type of player, they're real nice guys, sure—'Howarya, Howarya' and you're going to finish down in the cellar with them. Because they think they're giving you one hundred percent on the ball field and they're not. Give me some scratching, diving, hungry ballplayers who come to kill you. Now, Stanky's the nicest gentleman who ever drew breath, but when the bell rings you're his mortal enemy. That's the kind of a guy I want playing for me." That was the context. To explain why Eddie Stanky was so valuable to me by comparing him to a group of far more talented players who were—in fact—in last place. Frankie Graham did write it up that way. In that respect, Graham was the most remarkable reporter I ever met. He would sit there and never take a note, and then you'd pick up the paper and find yourself quoted word for word. But the other writers who picked it up ran two sentences together to make it sound as if I were saying that you couldn't be a decent person and succeed.

Durocher is also credited with popularizing the metaphorical use of the phrase "capture lightning in a bottle" in a baseball context—it had previously been used to literally refer to Benjamin Franklin's kite experiment.

=== Suspension ===
During spring training 1947, Durocher became involved in a very unpleasant feud with Larry MacPhail, who had become a new co-owner of the Yankees. The Yankee boss had hired away two coaches from Durocher's 1946 staff (Chuck Dressen and Red Corriden) during the off-season, causing friction. Then, matters got worse.

In person, Durocher and MacPhail exchanged a series of accusations and counter-accusations, with each suggesting the other invited gamblers into their clubhouses. In the press, a ghostwritten article appeared under Durocher's name in the Brooklyn Eagle, seeking to stir the rivalry between their respective clubs and accusing baseball of a double standard for Chandler's warning him against his associations but not MacPhail or other baseball executives.

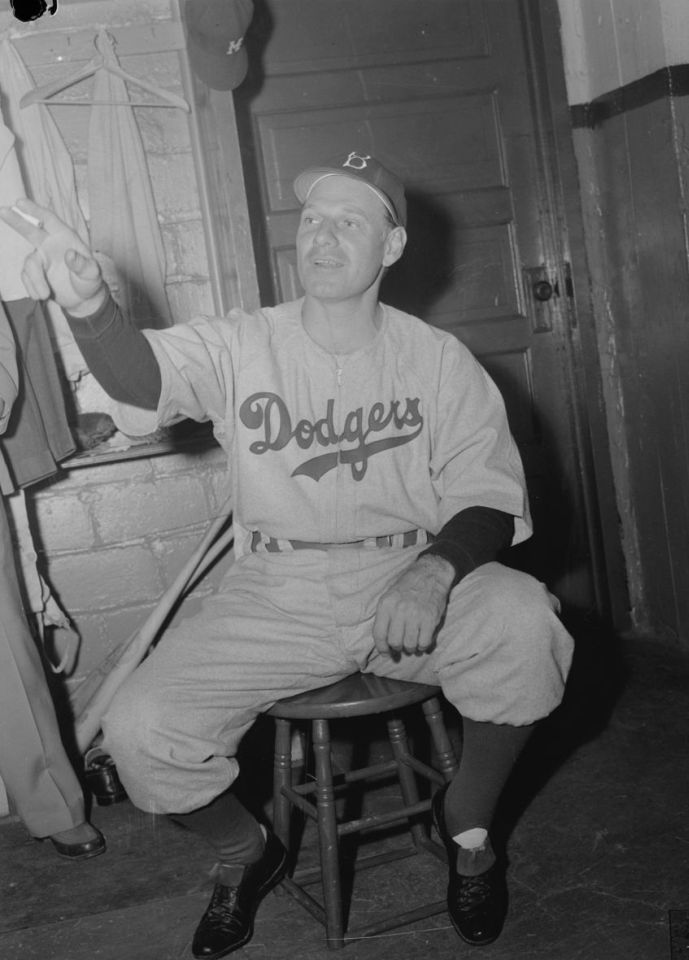
Durocher in the dressing room of Delorimier Stadium in Montreal in July 1946.

Chandler was pressured by MacPhail, a close friend who was pivotal in having him appointed commissioner, but the commissioner also discovered Durocher and Raft might have run a rigged craps game that swindled an active ballplayer of a large sum of money. (The player's identity was never confirmed officially, but former Detroit Tigers pitcher Elden Auker wrote in his 2002 memoir that it was Tigers pitcher Dizzy Trout.) Chandler suspended Durocher for the 1947 season for "association with known gamblers".

Before being suspended, however, Durocher played a noteworthy role in erasing baseball's color line. In the spring of 1947, he let it be known that he would not tolerate the dissent of those players on the team who opposed Jackie Robinson's joining the club, saying:

I do not care if the guy is yellow or black, or if he has stripes like a fuckin' zebra. I'm the manager of this team, and I say he plays. What's more, I say he can make us all rich. And if any of you cannot use the money, I will see that you are all traded.

He greatly admired Robinson for his hustle and aggression, calling him "a Durocher with talent."

While Durocher sat out his suspension, the Dodgers went on to win the National League pennant under an interim skipper, scout Burt Shotton. They then went on to lose the 1947 World Series to MacPhail's Yankees in seven games.

=== New York Giants (1948–1955) ===
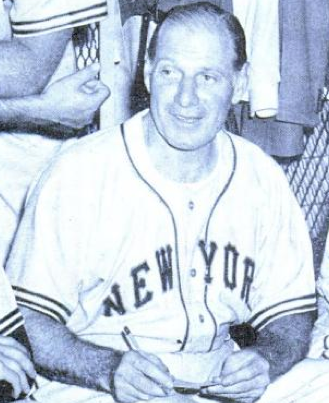
Durocher with the Giants in 1948.

Durocher returned for the 1948 season, but his outspoken personality and a 35-37 start again caused friction with Rickey, and on July 16 Durocher, Rickey, and New York Giants owner Horace Stoneham negotiated a deal whereby Durocher was let out of his Brooklyn contract to take over the Dodgers' cross-town rivals. He enjoyed perhaps his greatest success with the Giants, and possibly a measure of revenge against the Dodgers, as the Giants won the 1951 NL pennant in a playoff against Brooklyn, ultimately triumphing on Bobby Thomson's historic game-winning "Shot 'Heard 'Round The World" home run.

Later with the Giants in 1954, Durocher won his only World Series championship as a manager by sweeping the heavily favored Cleveland Indians, who posted the highest American League winning percentage of all time (111–43) during the regular season.

Alvin Dark, who played under Durocher during this period, admired his manager. He thought that Durocher's strength was letting veterans play according to their strengths, then supporting them. An aggressive manager, he either succeeded in getting the best out of players or getting nothing out of them, depending on how they responded. "If you stood up for Leo publicly, he'd go to the wall for you. He'd take the blame for every mistake you made, and expose himself to the criticism."

After leaving the Giants following the 1955 season, Durocher became an executive at NBC. He was a color commentator on the Major League Baseball on NBC and host of The NBC Comedy Hour and Jackpot Bowling.

=== Chicago Cubs (1966–1972) ===
1969 picture pack card of Durocher for Chicago Cubs

Durocher returned to the managerial ranks in 1966 with the Chicago Cubs. In several previous seasons, the Cubs had tried an experiment called the "College of Coaches", in which they were led by a "head coach" rather than a manager. However, at his first press conference, Durocher formally announced an end to the experiment by saying:

If no announcement has been made about what my title is, I'm making it here and now. I'm the manager. I'm not a head coach. I'm the manager.

At the same press conference, Durocher declared, "I am not the manager of an eighth-place team." He was right; the Cubs finished tenth in his first season, becoming the first team to finish behind the previously hapless New York Mets. In 1967, however, the Cubs started strongly and had only their second winning season since 1946. The team steadily improved, but in 1969, Durocher suffered one of his most remembered failures. The Cubs started the season on a tear and led the newly created National League East for 105 days. By mid-August they had a seemingly insurmountable nine-game cushion and they appeared to be a shoo-in for their first postseason appearance in 25 years. However, they floundered down the stretch, losing 25 of their last 40 games, and finished eight games behind the "Miracle Mets".

In a mid-July series against the Mets, the Cubs were beaten in the first two games at Shea Stadium, but finally managed to salvage the third game, after which Durocher was asked if those were the real Cubs.

'"No", Durocher answered, "those are the real Mets."

Part of Durocher's problem was that, while the Cubs were playing well in 1969, he began starting their best pitchers on two or three days' rest. While this led to immediate success, it exhausted the pitchers in the long run, resulting in poorer performance later in the season.

While with the Cubs, Durocher encountered a difficult dilemma in regard to aging superstar Ernie Banks. While Banks' bad knees made him a liability, his legendary status made benching him impossible. Durocher also nearly came to blows with Cubs star Ron Santo during an infamous clubhouse near-riot. The problems were symbolic of Durocher's difficulty in managing the new breed of wealthier, more outspoken players who had come up during his long career. With a mediocre record of 46–44, Durocher was fired midway through the 1972 season, later stating that his greatest regret in baseball was not being able to win a pennant for longtime Cubs owner Philip K. Wrigley.

=== Houston Astros (1972–1973) ===
1973 photocard of Durocher as manager of the Houston Astros

Durocher managed the Houston Astros for the final 31 games of the 1972 season (posting a 16–15 record in that span), replacing Harry Walker while being tapped by general manager Spec Richardson in the belief that he could lead the Astros to a pennant. He would manage just one full season (1973), posting an 82–80 record despite dealing with intestinal problems (Preston Gomez stepped in to manage a portion of the season in his absence) as the Astros finished a middling fourth; one highlight was Durocher reaching 2,000 career wins late in the season. Durocher drew the ire of multiple people that ranged from players such as Larry Dierker to Marvin Miller. On October 1, he resigned as manager, despite requests from Richardson to stay another year (Gomez was named his successor). Durocher stated upon his retirement, “Baseball has been 45 years of a wonderful life. But I have got a lot of things to do now. I'm going out to Palm Springs and I'm going to tee it up and play a lot of golf.”

== Coaching and later career ==
=== Los Angeles Dodgers (1961–1964) ===
He later served as a coach for the Dodgers, by then relocated to Los Angeles, from 1961 to 1964.

During this period, Durocher, who had made his screen debut in the 1943 Red Skelton comedy Whistling in Brooklyn, played himself in many television shows. Durocher appeared on the CBS game show What's My Line? twice as a mystery guest (January 28, 1951, and May 31, 1953), the latter when his wife Day was a guest panelist. In an April 10, 1963, airing of The Beverly Hillbillies, Durocher plays golf with Jed Clampett (Buddy Ebsen) and Jethro Bodine (Max Baer, Jr.) and tries to sign Jethro to a baseball contract after discovering Jethro has a strong pitching arm. In 1964, he appeared as himself in an episode of Mr. Ed, when the talking horse gave batting tips to the Los Angeles Dodgers, helping them win the pennant. In an episode of The Munsters titled "Herman the Rookie," on April 8, 1965, Durocher believes Herman (Fred Gwynne) is the next Mickey Mantle when he sees the towering Munster hit long home runs. Football great Elroy Hirsch also appears with Durocher.

Durocher made a brief comeback in 1976 in the Japanese Pacific League with the Taiheiyo Club Lions, but he retired for illness (hepatitis) before the beginning of the season. Supposedly, the Lions made special jerseys based on American football jerseys to honor Durocher for joining the team, but were retired halfway through the season because their designs were ridiculed and because Durocher, as mentioned, did not join the team.

Dark thought that Durocher's managerial style changed in the 1960s and 1970s. Instead of making moves regardless of how others felt about them, he began to make what Dark called "safe" decisions. Dark thought that openly negative comments by Cubs players during the 1969 season "really hurt Leo", and that by managing games more safely, he stopped using the style that had once been successful for him.

== Retirement ==
Durocher finished his managerial career with a 2,008–1,709 record for a .540 winning percentage. He posted a winning record with each of the four teams he led and was the first manager to win 500 games with three different clubs. He had a losing full season just four times.

Durocher, with Ed Linn, wrote a memoir titled Nice Guys Finish Last, a book that was recently re-published by the University of Chicago Press.

Leo Durocher died in 1991 in Palm Springs, California, at the age of 86 and is buried in Forest Lawn, Hollywood Hills Cemetery in Los Angeles. He was posthumously inducted into the Baseball Hall of Fame in 1994, wearing a Brooklyn Dodgers cap. His third wife, Laraine Day, accepted the honor of speaking on his behalf for the ceremony.

== Managerial statistics ==
Team	Year	Regular season						Postseason			
Team	Year	Games	Won	Lost	Tied	Pct.	Games	Won	Lost	Pct.	Notes
BKN	1939	157	84	69	4	.548	3rd in NL	–	–	–	–
BKN	1940	156	88	65	3	.574	2nd in NL	–	–	–	–
BKN	1941	157	100	54	3	.646	1st in NL	1	4	.200	Lost World Series (NYY)
BKN	1942	155	104	50	1	.674	2nd in NL	–	–	–	–
BKN	1943	153	81	72	0	.529	3rd in NL	–	–	–	–
BKN	1944	155	63	91	1	.410	7th in NL	–	–	–	–
BKN	1945	155	87	67	1	.565	3rd in NL	–	–	–	–
BKN	1946	157	96	60	1	.615	2nd in NL	–	–	–	–
BKN	1948	73	35	37	1	.486	dismissed	–	–	–	–
BKN total		1,318	738	565	15	.566		1	4	.200	
NYG	1948	79	41	38	0	.519	5th in NL	–	–	–	–
NYG	1949	156	73	81	2	.474	5th in NL	–	–	–	–
NYG	1950	154	86	68	0	.558	3rd in NL	–	–	–	–
NYG	1951	157	98	59	0	.624	1st in NL	2	4	.333	Lost World Series (NYY)
NYG	1952	154	92	62	0	.597	2nd in NL	–	–	–	–
NYG	1953	155	70	84	1	.455	5th in NL	–	–	–	–
NYG	1954	154	97	57	0	.630	1st in NL	4	0	1.000	Won World Series (CLE)
NYG	1955	154	80	74	0	.519	3rd in NL	–	–	–	–
NYG total		1,163	637	523	3	.549		6	4	.600	
CHC	1966	162	59	103	0	.364	10th in NL	–	–	–	–
CHC	1967	162	87	74	1	.540	3rd in NL	–	–	–	–
CHC	1968	163	84	78	1	.518	3rd in NL	–	–	–	–
CHC	1969	163	92	70	1	.567	2nd in NL East	–	–	–	–
CHC	1970	162	84	78	0	.519	2nd in NL East	–	–	–	–
CHC	1971	162	83	79	0	.512	3rd in NL East	–	–	–	–
CHC	1972	91	46	44	1	.511	dismissed	–	–	–	–
CHC total		1,065	535	526	4	.504		0	0	–	
HOU	1972	31	16	15	0	.516	2nd in NL West	–	–	–	–
HOU	1973	162	82	80	0	.506	4th in NL West	–	–	–	–
HOU total		193	98	95	0	.508		0	0	–	
Total		3,739	2008	1709	22	.540		7	8	.467	

== Personal life ==
Durocher was married four times. He was married to Ruby Hartley from 1930 to 1934. He was married to St. Louis socialite Grace Dozier from 1934 to 1943. In 1947 he married actress Laraine Day, and they divorced in 1960. His fourth wife was Lynne Walker Goldblatt, to whom he was married from 1969 to 1980.

In 1943, Durocher was deemed ineligible for service in World War II because he had a punctured eardrum.

With Ruby Hartley, Durocher had a daughter named Barbara (born 1931).

He adopted two children with Day, daughter Melinda Michele (1944–2012), and son Chris (born 1945). Willie Mays used to babysit Chris on Giants' roadtrips—the two would room together and go see movies as well.

Durocher appeared on the September 22, 1954 episode of the CBS television show, I've Got a Secret.

Durocher also made numerous appearances in comedy: He portrayed himself on episodes of The Munsters, The Joey Bishop Show, Mister Ed, The Beverly Hillbillies, Screen Directors Playhouse, What's My Line, The Jack Benny Program radio show and other shows.

In the 2013 film 42 about Jackie Robinson, Durocher is played by Christopher Meloni.

== See also ==
- List of Major League Baseball player-managers
- List of Major League Baseball managers with most career ejections
- List of Major League Baseball managerial wins and winning percentage leaders

Media offices
Preceded by First	Lead color commentator, Major League Baseball on NBC; 1957–1959	Succeeded by Fred Haney
