= 1903 World Series =

First modern Major League Baseball championship

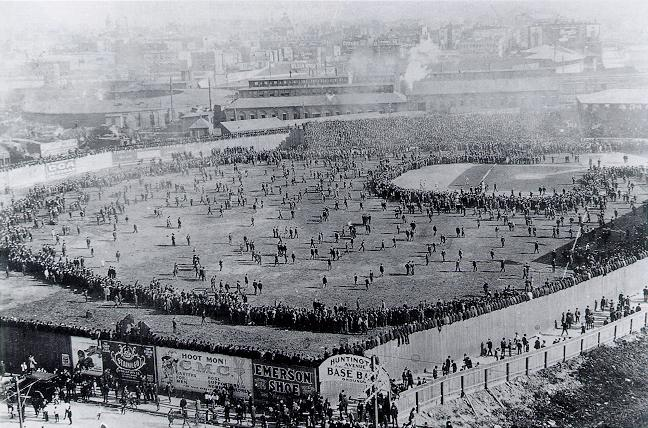
- An overflow crowd at the Huntington Avenue Grounds in Boston prior to Game 3
Team (Wins)	Managers	Season
Boston Americans (5)	Jimmy Collins (player/manager)	91–47, .659, GA: 14 1/2
Pittsburgh Pirates (3)	Fred Clarke (player/manager)	91–49, .650, GA: 6 1/2
- Dates: October 1–13
- Venue(s): Huntington Avenue Grounds (Boston); Exposition Park (Pittsburgh)
- Umpires: Hank O'Day (NL); Tom Connolly (AL)
- Hall of Famers: Umpires: Tom Connolly; Hank O'Day; Americans: Jimmy Collins; Cy Young; Pirates: Fred Clarke; Honus Wagner

The 1903 World Series was the first modern World Series to be played in Major League Baseball. It matched the American League (AL) champion Boston Americans (now the Boston Red Sox) against the National League (NL) champion Pittsburgh Pirates (Note: In the early 20th century and earlier, the name of Pittsburgh was spelled with and without the 'h'.) in a best-of-nine series, with Boston prevailing five games to three, winning the last four. This was the first major professional sports championship ever won by a Boston-based team. The first three games were played in Boston, the next four in Allegheny (home of the Pirates), and the eighth (last) game in Boston.

Pittsburgh pitcher Sam Leever injured his shoulder while trap shooting, so his teammate Deacon Phillippe pitched five complete games. Phillippe won three of his games, but it was not enough to overcome the club from the new American League. Boston pitchers Bill Dinneen and Cy Young led Boston to victory. In Game 1, Phillippe struck out ten Boston batters. The next day, Dinneen bettered that mark, striking out 11 Pittsburgh batters in Game 2.

Honus Wagner, bothered by injuries, batted only 6-for-27 (.222) in the Series and committed six errors. The shortstop was deeply distraught by his performance. The following spring, Wagner (who in 1903 led the National League in batting average) refused to send his portrait to a "Hall of Fame" for batting champions. "I was too bum last year", he wrote. "I was a joke in that Boston-Pittsburgh Series. What does it profit a man to hammer along and make a few hits when they are not needed only to fall down when it comes to a pinch? I would be ashamed to have my picture up now."

Due to overflow crowds at the Exposition Park games in Allegheny City, (Note: From 1882 to 1906, the team played in Allegheny, Pennsylvania, which was annexed by Pittsburgh as the North Side in 1907.) if a batted ball rolled under a rope in the outfield that held spectators back, a "ground-rule triple" would be scored. 17 ground-rule triples were hit in the four games played at the stadium.

In the series, Boston came back from a three games to one deficit, winning the final four games to capture the title. Such a large comeback would not happen again until the Pirates came back to defeat the Washington Senators in the 1925 World Series, and has happened only 11 times in baseball history. (The Pirates themselves repeated this feat in 1979 against the Baltimore Orioles.) Much was made of the influence of Boston's "Royal Rooters", who traveled to Exposition Park and sang their theme song "Tessie" to distract the opposing players (especially Wagner). Boston wound up winning three out of four games in Allegheny City.

Pirates owner Barney Dreyfuss added his share of the gate receipts to the players' share, so the losing team's players actually finished with a larger individual share than the winning team's.

The Series brought the new American League prestige and proved its best could beat the best of the National League, thus strengthening the demand for future World Series competitions.

== Background ==
=== A new league ===
In 1901, Ban Johnson, president of the Western League, a minor league organization, formed the American League to take advantage of the National League's 1900 contraction from twelve teams to eight. Johnson and fellow owners raided the National League and signed away many star players, including Cy Young and Jimmy Collins. Johnson had a list of 46 National Leaguers he targeted for the American League; by 1902, all but one had made the jump. The constant raiding, however, nixed the idea of a championship between the two leagues. Pirates owner Barney Dreyfuss, whose team ran away with the 1902 National League pennant, was open to a postseason contest and even said he would allow the American League champion to stock its roster with all-stars. However, Johnson had spoken of putting a team in Pittsburgh and even attempted to raid the Pirates' roster in August 1902, which soured Dreyfuss. At the end of the season, however, the Pirates played a group of American League All-Stars in a four-game exhibition series, winning two games to one, with one tie.

The leagues finally called a truce in the winter of 1902–03 and formed the National Commission to preside over organized baseball. The following season, the Boston Americans and Pittsburgh Pirates had secured their respective championship pennants by September. That August, Dreyfuss challenged the American League to an 11-game championship series. Encouraged by Johnson and National League President Harry Pulliam, Americans owner Henry J. Killilea met with Dreyfuss in Pittsburgh in September and instead agreed to a best-of-nine championship, with the first three games played in Boston, the next four in Allegheny City, and the remaining two (if necessary) in Boston.

One significant point about this agreement was that it was an arrangement primarily between the two clubs rather than a formal arrangement between the leagues. In short, it was a voluntary event, a fact which would result in no Series at all for 1904. The formal establishment of the Series as a compulsory event started in 1905.

== The teams ==
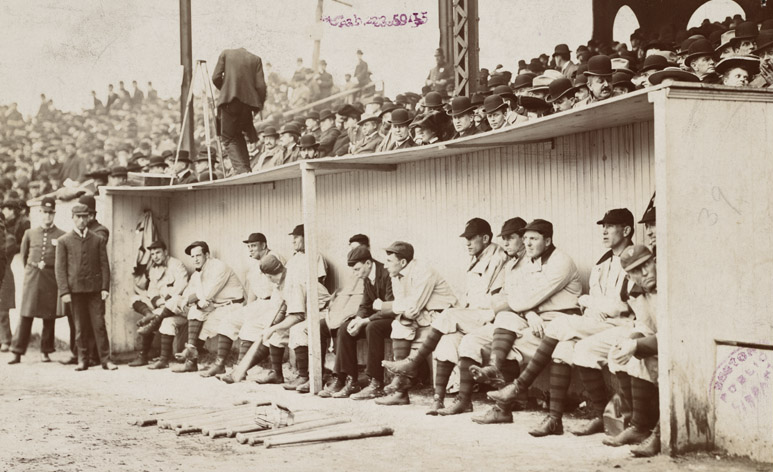
The 1903 Pittsburgh Pirates

1903 World Series Teams

The Pirates won their third straight pennant in 1903 thanks to a powerful lineup that included legendary shortstop Honus Wagner, who hit .355 and drove in 101 runs, player-manager Fred Clarke, who hit .351, and Ginger Beaumont, who hit .341 and led the league in hits and runs. The Pirates' pitching was weaker than it had been in previous years but boasted 24-game winner Deacon Phillippe and 25-game winner Sam Leever.

The Americans had a strong pitching staff, led by Cy Young, who went 28–9 in 1903 and became the all-time wins leader that year. Bill Dinneen and Long Tom Hughes, right-handers like Young, had won 21 games and 20 games each. The Boston outfield, featuring Chick Stahl (.274), Buck Freeman (.287, 104 RBI) and Patsy Dougherty (.331, 101 runs scored) was considered excellent.

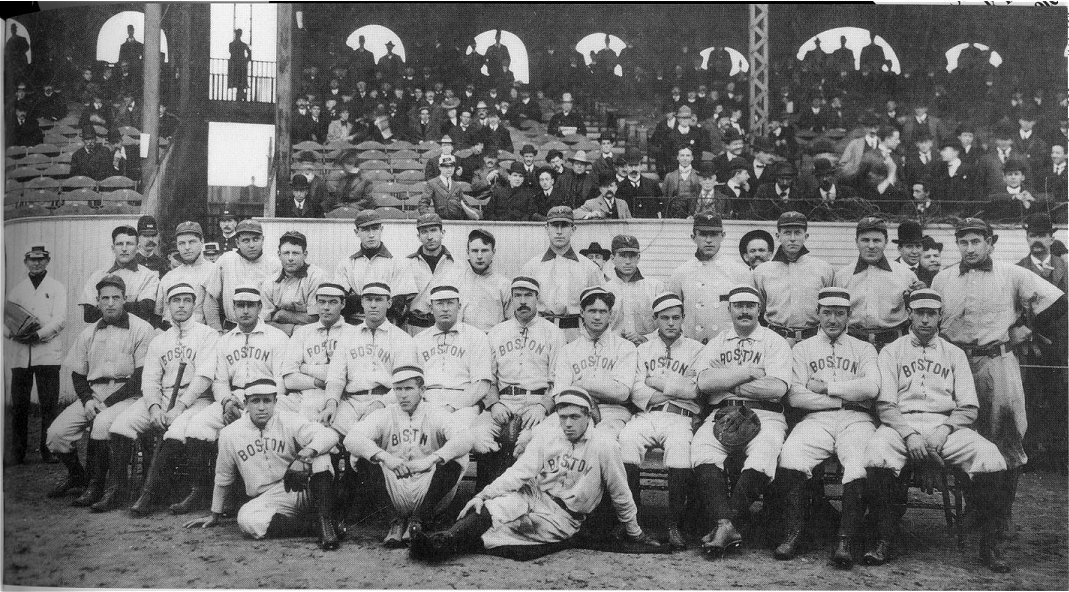
The 1903 Boston Americans and Pittsburgh Pirates

Although the Pirates had dominated their league for the previous three years, they went into the series riddled with injuries and plagued by bizarre misfortunes. Otto Krueger, the team's only utility player, was beaned on September 19 and never fully played in the series. 16-game winner Ed Doheny left the team three days later, exhibiting signs of paranoia; he was committed to an insane asylum the following month. Leever had been battling an injury to his pitching arm (which he made worse by entering a trapshooting competition). Worst of all, Wagner, who had a sore thumb throughout the season, injured his right leg in September and was never 100 percent for the postseason.

Some sources say Boston were heavy underdogs. Boston bookies actually gave even odds to the teams (and only because Dreyfuss and other "sports" were alleged to have bet on Pittsburgh to bring down the odds). The teams were generally thought to be evenly matched, with the Americans credited with stronger pitching and the Pirates with superior offense and fielding. The outcome, many believed, hinged on Wagner's health. "If Wagner does not play, bet your money at two to one on Boston", said the Sporting News, "but if he does play, place your money at two to one on Pittsburg."

== Summary ==
AL Boston Americans (5) vs. NL Pittsburgh Pirates (3)

Game	Date	Score	Location	Time	Attendance
1	October 1	Pittsburgh Pirates – 7, Boston Americans – 3	Huntington Avenue Baseball Grounds	1:55	16,242
2	October 2	Pittsburgh Pirates – 0, Boston Americans – 3	Huntington Avenue Baseball Grounds	1:47	9,415
3	October 3	Pittsburgh Pirates – 4, Boston Americans – 2	Huntington Avenue Baseball Grounds	1:50	18,801
4	October 6	Boston Americans – 4, Pittsburgh Pirates – 5	Exposition Park (III)	1:30	7,600
5	October 7	Boston Americans – 11, Pittsburgh Pirates – 2	Exposition Park (III)	2:00	12,322
6	October 8	Boston Americans – 6, Pittsburgh Pirates – 3	Exposition Park (III)	2:02	11,556
7	October 10	Boston Americans – 7, Pittsburgh Pirates – 3	Exposition Park (III)	1:45	17,038
8	October 13	Pittsburgh Pirates – 0, Boston Americans – 3	Huntington Avenue Baseball Grounds	1:35	7,455

== Matchups ==
=== Game 1 ===
Jimmy Sebring hit the first home run in World Series history, an inside-the-park home run in Game 1.

Thursday, October 1, 1903, at Huntington Avenue Baseball Grounds in Boston, Massachusetts
Team	1	2	3	4	5	6	7	8	9	R	H	E
Pittsburgh	4	0	1	1	0	0	1	0	0	7	12	2
Boston	0	0	0	0	0	0	2	0	1	3	6	4
WP: Deacon Phillippe (1–0) LP: Cy Young (0–1); Home runs: PIT: Jimmy Sebring (1); BOS: None; Boxscore

The Pirates started Game 1 strong, scoring six runs in the first four innings, and held on to win the first World Series game in modern baseball history. They extended their lead to 7–0 on an inside-the-park home run by Jimmy Sebring in the seventh, the first home run in World Series history. Boston scored a few runs in the last three innings, but it was too little, too late; they ended up losing 7–3 in the first ever World Series game. Both Phillippe and Young threw complete games, with Phillippe striking out ten and Young fanning five, but Young also gave up twice as many hits and allowed three earned runs to Phillippe's two.

=== Game 2 ===
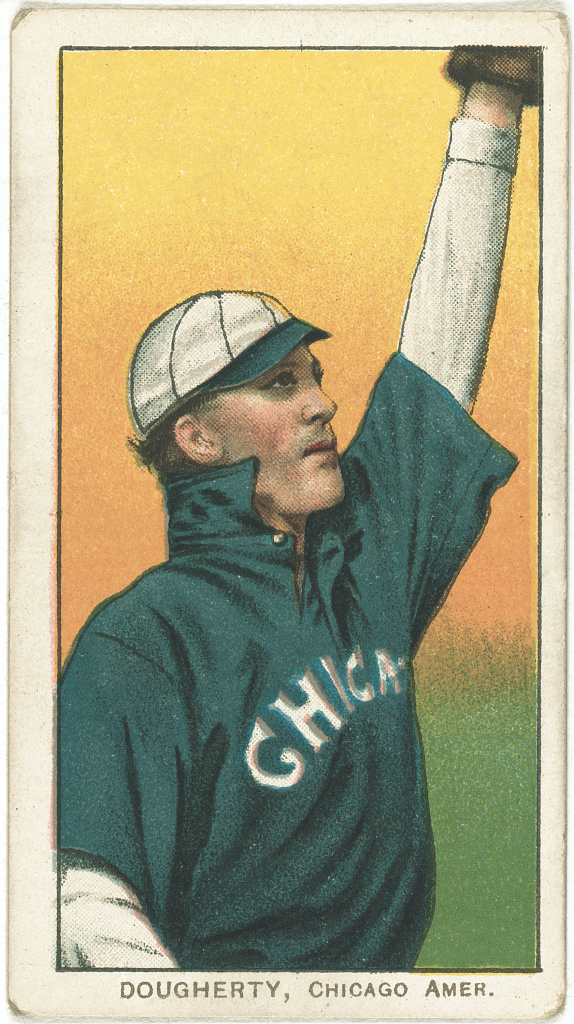
In Game 2, Patsy Dougherty hit the first over-the-fence home run in World Series history.

Friday, October 2, 1903, at Huntington Avenue Baseball Grounds in Boston, Massachusetts
Team	1	2	3	4	5	6	7	8	9	R	H	E
Pittsburgh	0	0	0	0	0	0	0	0	0	0	3	2
Boston	2	0	0	0	0	1	0	0	X	3	8	0
WP: Bill Dinneen (1–0) LP: Sam Leever (0–1); Home runs: PIT: None; BOS: Patsy Dougherty 2 (2); Boxscore

After starting out strong in Game 1, the Pirates simply shut down offensively, eking out a mere three hits, all singles. Pittsburgh starter Sam Leever went 1 inning and gave up three hits and two runs, before his ailing arm forced him to leave in favor of Bucky Veil, who finished the game. Bill Dinneen struck out 11 and pitched a complete game for the Americans, while Patsy Dougherty hit home runs in the first and sixth innings for two of the Boston's three runs. The Americans' Patsy Dougherty led off the Boston scoring with an inside-the-park home run, the first time a lead-off batter did just that until Alcides Escobar of the Kansas City Royals duplicated the feat in the 2015 World Series, 112 years later. Dougherty's second home run was the first in World Series history to actually sail over the fence, an incredibly rare feat at the time.

=== Game 3 ===
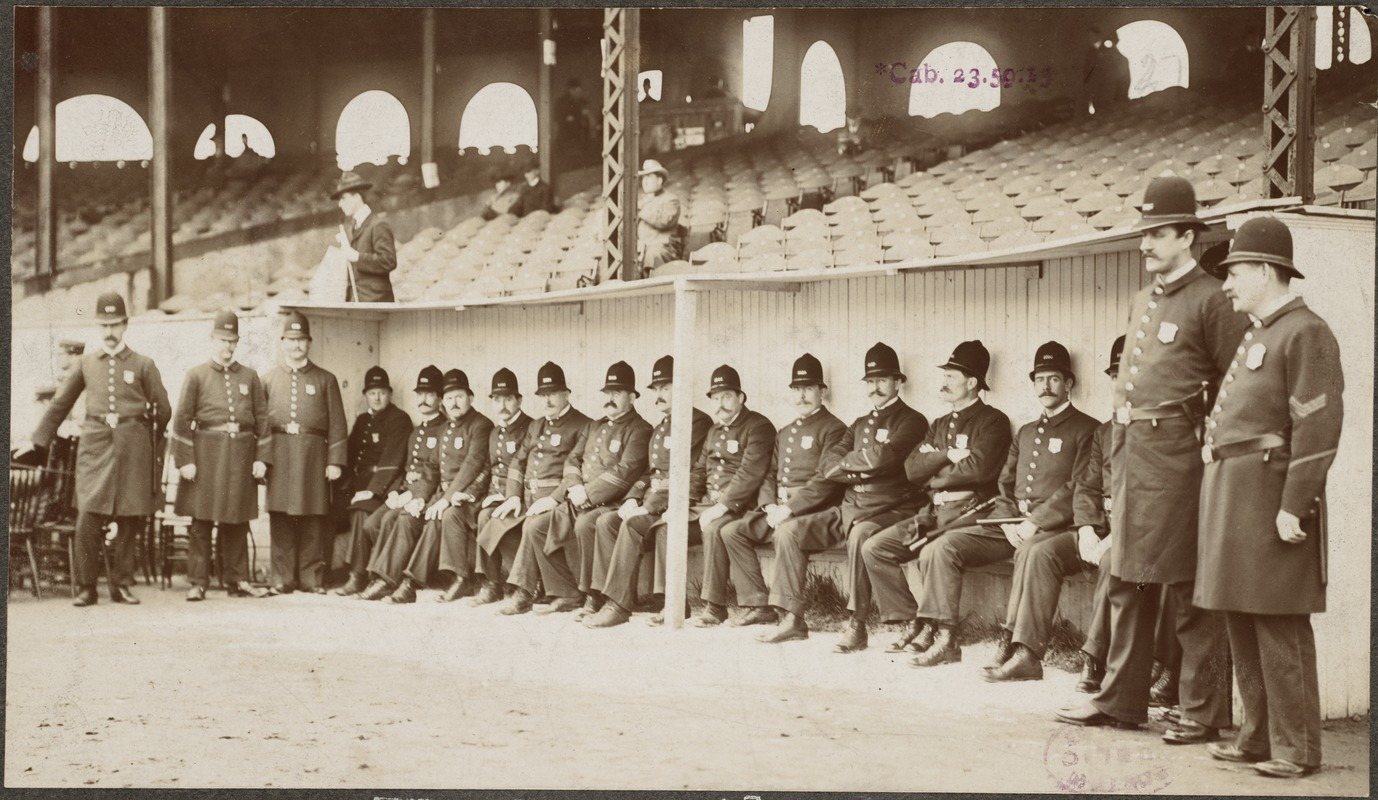
Members of the Boston Police Department at Huntington Avenue Grounds during the series

Saturday, October 3, 1903, at Huntington Avenue Baseball Grounds in Boston, Massachusetts
Team	1	2	3	4	5	6	7	8	9	R	H	E
Pittsburgh	0	1	2	0	0	0	0	1	0	4	7	1
Boston	0	0	0	1	0	0	0	1	0	2	4	2
WP: Deacon Phillippe (2–0) LP: Tom Hughes (0–1); Boxscore

Phillippe, pitching after only a single day of rest, started Game 3 for the Pirates and didn't let them down, hurling his second complete-game victory of the Series to put Pittsburgh up two games to one.

=== Game 4 ===
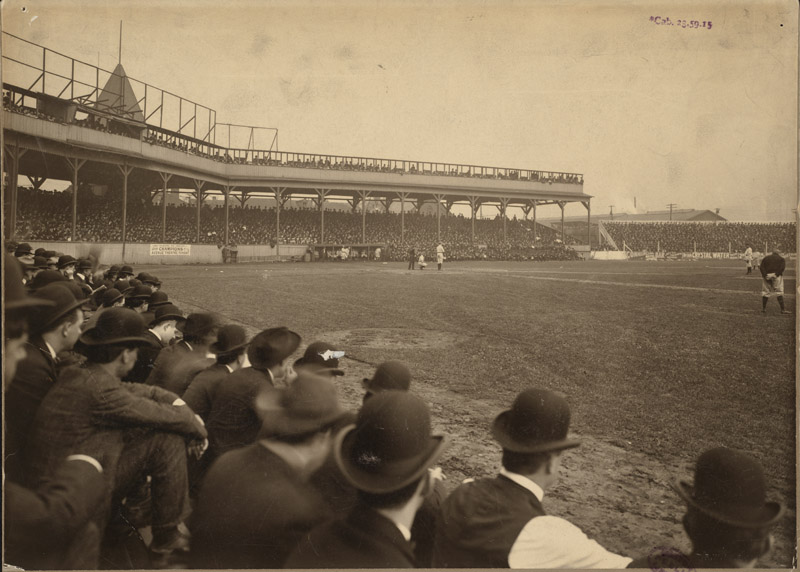
Game 4 at Exposition Park

Tuesday, October 6, 1903, at Exposition Park (III) in Allegheny, Pennsylvania
Team	1	2	3	4	5	6	7	8	9	R	H	E
Boston	0	0	0	0	1	0	0	0	3	4	9	1
Pittsburgh	1	0	0	0	1	0	3	0	X	5	12	1
WP: Deacon Phillippe (3–0) LP: Bill Dinneen (1–1); Boxscore

After two days of rest, Phillippe was ready to pitch a second straight game. He threw his third complete-game victory of the series against Bill Dinneen, who was making his second start of the series. But Phillippe's second straight win was almost not to be, as the Americans, down 5–1 in the top of the ninth, rallied to narrow the deficit to one run. The comeback attempt failed, as Phillippe managed to put an end to it and give the Pirates a commanding 3–1 series lead.

=== Game 5 ===
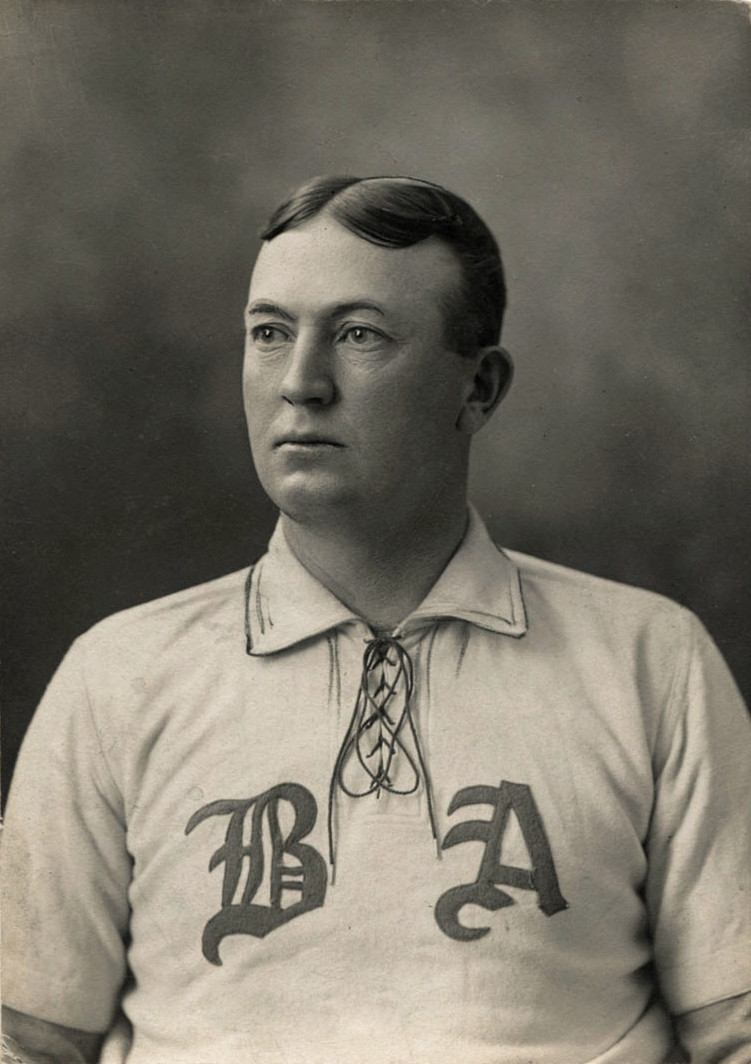
Game 5 winning pitcher Cy Young

Wednesday, October 7, 1903, at Exposition Park (III) in Allegheny, Pennsylvania
Team	1	2	3	4	5	6	7	8	9	R	H	E
Boston	0	0	0	0	0	6	4	1	0	11	13	2
Pittsburgh	0	0	0	0	0	0	0	2	0	2	6	4
WP: Cy Young (1–1) LP: Brickyard Kennedy (0–1); Boxscore

Game 5 was a pitcher's duel for the first five innings, with Boston's Cy Young and Pittsburgh's Brickyard Kennedy giving up no runs. That changed in the top of the sixth, however, when the Americans scored a then-record six runs before being retired. Young, on the other hand, managed to keep his shutout intact before finally giving up a pair of runs in the bottom of the eighth. He went the distance and struck out four for his first World Series win.

=== Game 6 ===
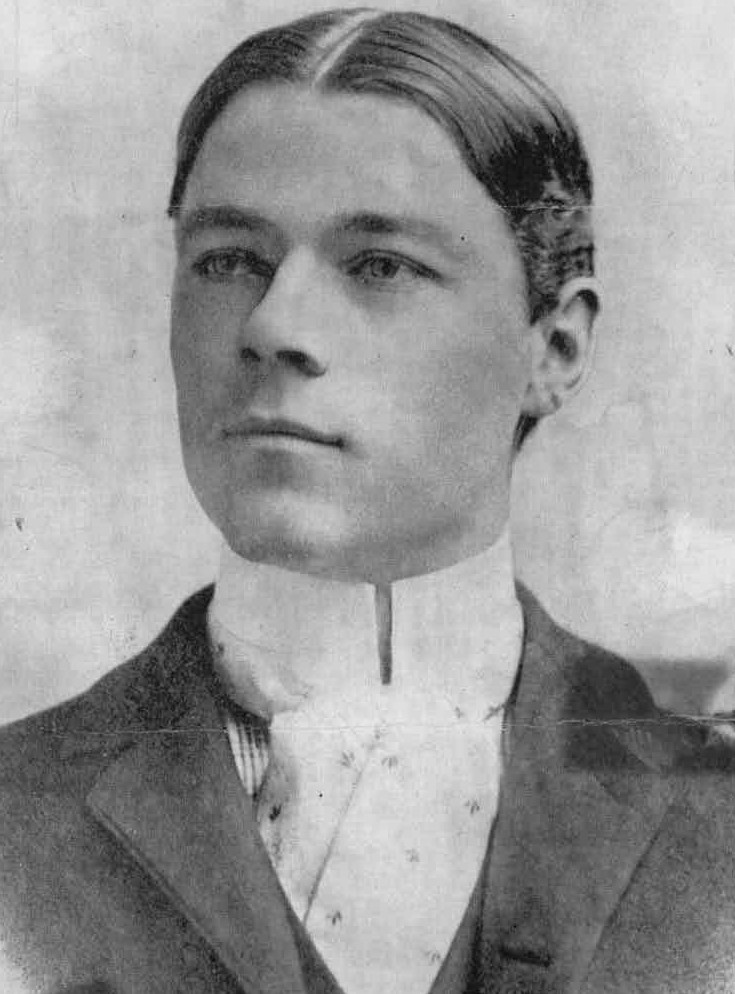
Game 6 winning pitcher Bill Dinneen

Thursday, October 8, 1903, at Exposition Park (III) in Allegheny, Pennsylvania
Team	1	2	3	4	5	6	7	8	9	R	H	E
Boston	0	0	3	0	2	0	1	0	0	6	10	1
Pittsburgh	0	0	0	0	0	0	3	0	0	3	10	3
WP: Bill Dinneen (2–1) LP: Sam Leever (0–2); Boxscore

Game 6 was a rematch between the starters of Game 2, Boston's Dinneen and Pittsburgh's Leever. Leever pitched a complete game this time but so did Dinneen, who outmatched him to earn his second complete-game victory of the series. After losing three of the first four games of the World Series, the underdog Americans had tied the series at three games apiece.

=== Game 7 ===
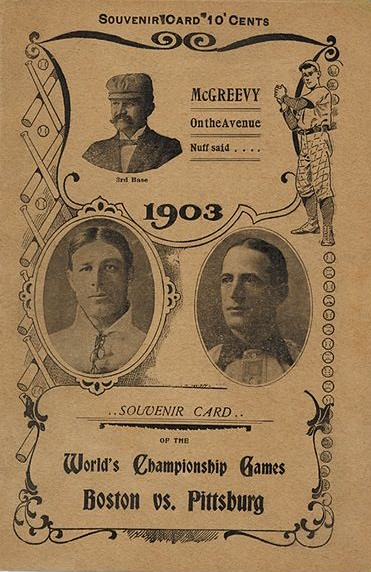
Souvenir card of the "World's Championship Games"

Saturday, October 10, 1903, at Exposition Park (III) in Allegheny, Pennsylvania
Team	1	2	3	4	5	6	7	8	9	R	H	E
Boston	2	0	0	2	0	2	0	1	0	7	11	4
Pittsburgh	0	0	0	1	0	1	0	0	1	3	10	3
WP: Cy Young (2–1) LP: Deacon Phillippe (3–1); Boxscore

The fourth and final game in Allegheny saw Phillippe start his fourth game of the Series for the Pirates. This time, however, he did not fare as well as he did in his first three starts. Cy Young, in his third start of the Series, held the Pirates to three runs and put the Americans ahead for the first time as the Series moved back to Boston.

=== Game 8 ===
Tuesday, October 13, 1903, at Huntington Avenue Baseball Grounds in Boston, Massachusetts
Team	1	2	3	4	5	6	7	8	9	R	H	E
Pittsburgh	0	0	0	0	0	0	0	0	0	0	4	3
Boston	0	0	0	2	0	1	0	0	X	3	8	0
WP: Bill Dinneen (3–1) LP: Deacon Phillippe (3–2); Boxscore

The final game of this inaugural World Series started out as an intense pitcher's duel, scoreless until the bottom of the fourth when Hobe Ferris hit a two-run single. Phillippe started his fifth and final game of the series and Dinneen his fourth. As he did in Game 2, Dinneen threw a complete-game shutout, striking out seven and leading his Americans to victory, while Phillippe pitched respectably but could not match Dinneen because his arm had been worn out with five starts in the eight games, giving up three runs to give the first 20th-century World Championship to the Boston Americans, Honus Wagner striking out to end the Series.

== Composite line score ==
1903 World Series (5–3): Boston Americans (A.L.) over Pittsburgh Pirates (N.L.)

Team	1	2	3	4	5	6	7	8	9	R	H	E
Boston Americans	4	0	3	5	3	10	7	3	4	39	69	14
Pittsburgh Pirates	5	1	3	2	1	1	7	3	1	24	64	19
Total attendance: 100,429 Average attendance: 12,554; Winning player's share: $1,182 Losing player's share: $1,316

== Series statistics ==
=== Boston Americans ===
==== Batting ====
Note: GP=Games played; AB=At bats; R=Runs; H=Hits; 2B=Doubles; 3B=Triples; HR=Home runs; RBI=Runs batted in; BB=Walks; AVG=Batting average; OBP=On base percentage; SLG=Slugging percentage

Player	GP	AB	R	H	2B	3B	HR	RBI	BB	AVG	OBP	SLG	Reference
Jimmy Collins	8	36	5	9	1	2	0	1	1	.250	.270	.389	
Lou Criger	8	26	1	6	0	0	0	4	2	.231	.286	.231	
Bill Dinneen	4	12	1	2	2	1	0	0	1	.167	.231	.167	
Patsy Dougherty	8	34	3	8	0	2	2	5	2	.235	.297	.529	
Duke Farrell	2	2	0	0	0	0	0	1	0	.000	.000	.000	
Hobe Ferris	8	31	3	9	0	1	0	5	0	.290	.313	.355	
Buck Freeman	8	32	6	9	0	3	0	4	2	.281	.324	.469	
Long Tom Hughes	1	0	0	0	0	0	0	0	0	.000	.000	.000	
Candy LaChance	8	27	5	6	2	1	0	4	3	.222	.300	.370	
Jack O'Brien	2	2	0	0	0	0	0	0	0	.000	.000	.000	
Freddy Parent	8	32	8	9	0	3	0	4	1	.281	.324	.469	
Chick Stahl	8	33	6	10	1	3	0	3	1	.303	.324	.515	
Cy Young	4	15	1	1	0	1	0	3	0	.067	.067	.200	

==== Pitching ====
Note: G=Games Played; GS=Games Started; ERA=Earned Run Average; W=Wins; L=Losses; SV=Saves; IP=Innings Pitched; H=Hits; R=Runs; ER= Earned Runs; BB=Walks; SO= Strikeouts

Player	G	GS	ERA	W	L	SV	IP	H	R	ER	BB	SO	Reference
Bill Dinneen	4	4	2.06	3	1	0	35.0	29	8	8	8	28	
Tom Hughes	1	1	9.00	0	1	0	2.0	4	3	2	2	0	
Cy Young	4	3	1.85	2	1	0	34.0	31	13	7	4	17	

=== Pittsburgh Pirates ===
==== Batting ====
Note: GP=Games played; AB=At bats; R=Runs; H=Hits; 2B=Doubles; 3B=Triples; HR=Home runs; RBI=Runs batted in; BB=Walks; AVG=Batting average; OBP=On base percentage; SLG=Slugging percentage

Player	GP	AB	R	H	2B	3B	HR	RBI	BB	AVG	OBP	SLG	Reference
Ginger Beaumont	8	34	6	9	0	1	0	2	2	.265	.306	.324	
Kitty Bransfield	8	29	3	6	0	2	0	1	1	.207	.233	.345	
Fred Clarke	8	34	3	9	2	1	0	0	1	.265	.286	.382	
Brickyard Kennedy	1	2	0	1	1	0	0	0	0	.500	.500	1.000	
Tommy Leach	8	33	3	9	0	4	0	8	1	.273	.294	.515	
Sam Leever	2	4	0	0	0	0	0	0	0	.000	.000	.000	
Ed Phelps	8	26	1	6	2	0	0	1	1	.231	.259	.308	
Deacon Phillippe	5	18	1	4	0	0	0	1	0	.222	.222	.222	
Claude Ritchey	8	27	2	4	1	0	0	2	4	.148	.258	.185	
Jimmy Sebring	8	30	3	10	0	1	1	4	1	.333	.355	.500	
Harry Smith	1	3	0	0	0	0	0	0	0	.000	.000	.000	
Gus Thompson	1	1	0	0	0	0	0	0	0	.000	.000	.000	
Bucky Veil	1	2	0	0	0	0	0	0	0	.000	.000	.000	
Honus Wagner	8	27	2	6	1	0	0	3	3	.222	.323	.259	

==== Pitching ====
Note: G=Games Played; GS=Games Started; ERA=Earned Run Average; W=Wins; L=Losses; SV=Saves; IP=Innings Pitched; H=Hits; R=Runs; ER= Earned Runs; BB=Walks; SO= Strikeouts

Player	G	GS	ERA	W	L	SV	IP	H	R	ER	BB	SO	Reference
Brickyard Kennedy	1	1	5.14	0	1	0	7.0	10	10	4	3	3	
Sam Leever	2	2	5.40	0	2	0	10.0	13	8	6	3	2	
Deacon Phillippe	5	5	3.07	3	2	0	44.0	38	19	15	3	22	
Gus Thompson	1	0	4.50	0	0	0	2.0	3	1	1	0	1	
Bucky Veil	1	0	1.29	0	0	0	7.0	5	1	1	5	1	

== Aftermath ==
The Red Sox would go on to be one of the most dominant teams of the early 20th century, winning four championships in six years during the 1910s decade. They would start their dynasty in 1912 when they won their next championship over the New York Giants in seven games.

The Pirates would return to the World Series in 1909, and defeated the Detroit Tigers in seven games to win their first championship.
