= Bucky Veil =

American baseball player (1881–1931)

- Pitcher
- Born: August 2, 1881; Tyrone, Pennsylvania
- Died: April 16, 1931 (aged 49); Altoona, Pennsylvania
- Batted: Right Threw: Right

MLB debut
- April 19, 1903, for the Pittsburgh Pirates

Last MLB appearance
- April 23, 1904, for the Pittsburgh Pirates

MLB statistics
- Pitching Record: 5-3
- Earned run average: 3.95
- Strikeouts: 21
- Stats at Baseball Reference

Teams
- Pittsburgh Pirates (1903–1904)

Frederick William "Bucky" Veil (August 2, 1881 – April 16, 1931) was an American Major League Baseball pitcher. He pitched for the Pittsburgh Pirates in 1903 and 1904.

== Career ==
Frederick played both baseball and football at Williamsport High School, the latter of which earned him the nickname "Bucky" for his mastery of the buck-lateral.

In January 1901 Veil attended Bucknell University on a baseball scholarship. That summer he pitched for a semi-pro team in Altoona, Pennsylvania, where he was scouted by Pittsburgh Pirates owner Barney Dreyfuss. Veil signed a contract with Dreyfuss in October 1902, and joined his former Bucknell teammate Jimmy Sebring during the 1903 season.

Veil appeared in the second game of the inaugural World Series, becoming the first relief pitcher in World Series history.

Veil return to Altoona in 1904 and played his final Major League season. From 1905 to 1909 Veil played in the minor leagues:

- 1905-1906, 1907 Columbus Senators (American Association)
- 1907 Williamsport Millionaires (Tri-State League)
- 1908 Binghamton Bingoes (New York State League)
- 1908 Wilkes-Barre Barons (New York State League)

1909 Wilmington/Sunbury (Atlantic League)

In 1909 he also managed with Wilmington/Sunbury.
