= Little League home run =

Baseball term

A Little League home run is a play in baseball during which a batter scores a run during their plate appearance with the aid of one or more errors committed by the fielding team. Despite the name, the player is not credited with a home run, but rather as having advanced on an error. It is so called because the play is presumably evocative of how young children in the process of learning how to play the sport frequently commit fielding and throwing errors that allow batters (as well as runners already on base during the at bat) to take more bases than they might otherwise normally take on the batted ball put into play. The term stems from Little League Baseball, founded in 1939 as an organizing body for local youth baseball and softball leagues throughout the United States and the rest of the world.

Given the prevalence of such plays at the actual Little League level, the play is remarkable only when batters playing in advanced leagues, up to and including the major leagues, commit such error-prone plays, since it is presumed that baseball players at the advanced amateur and professional levels are skillful enough to avoid them on a routine basis.

The earliest known media account to use the term "Little League home run" was a game recap written by Jeff Prugh, California Angels beat writer for the Los Angeles Times, in reference to a Little League home run hit by Denny Doyle versus the Detroit Tigers on June 1, 1974.

The first known effort to catalogue and report on incidences of Little League home runs at the major league level was undertaken by Chuck Hildebrandt, who presented his research to the annual conference of the Society of American Baseball Research (SABR) in Chicago, Illinois on June 27, 2015. The definition of the Little League home run announced during the presentation, was any play during which (1) the batter scores; and (2) two or more errors are committed by the fielding team, regardless as to whether the batter reaches base by way of error or base hit. This definition was established to allow queries to be run against a database of major league games for which play-by-play narrative is available, as maintained by Retrosheet.

In a subsequent article published by Hildebrandt in SABR's Baseball Research Journal in April 2017, the definition was expanded to reflect any play during which (1) the batter scores; and either (2a) two or more errors are committed by the fielding team, or (2b) one error is committed on a play which is not an extra-base hit, provided the error is charged to a non-outfielder (i.e., meaning by any infielder, the pitcher, or the catcher).

As of the close of the 2017 major league baseball season, a total of 358 Little League home runs have been discovered to have occurred during the 163,081 games that are available for play-by-play query in the Retrosheet database, or roughly one LLHR for every 455 games available. These plays are all consistent with the revised 2017 definition as described above, and have been all confirmed either through contemporary newspaper accounts, or by video or audio clips from the broadcasts of the games during which they occurred.

The earliest known Little League home run discovered as of 2018 was made by Ty Cobb of the Detroit Tigers versus the Cleveland Naps on September 10, 1911, nearly 28 years before the Little League organization itself was founded and thus available to lend its name to such a play. Fred Blanding was the Naps pitcher who yielded the Little League home run to Cobb.

== See also ==
- Inside-the-park home run, a similar play but without fielding errors
