= Jimmy Sebring =

American baseball player (1882–1909)

- Outfielder
- Born: March 22, 1882; Liberty, Pennsylvania, U.S.
- Died: December 22, 1909 (aged 27); Williamsport, Pennsylvania, U.S.
- Batted: Left Threw: Right

MLB debut
- September 8, 1902, for the Pittsburgh Pirates

Last MLB appearance
- August 6, 1909, for the Washington Senators

MLB statistics
- Batting average: .261
- Home runs: 6
- Runs batted in: 168
- Stats at Baseball Reference

Teams
- Pittsburgh Pirates (1902–1904); Cincinnati Reds (1904–1905); Brooklyn Superbas (1909); Washington Senators (1909)

James Dennison Sebring (March 22, 1882 – December 22, 1909) was an American professional baseball player who played outfield from 1902 to 1909. He attended college at Bucknell University. He played in the 1903 World Series with the Pittsburgh Pirates and was the first player in World Series history to hit a home run. He died of Bright's disease in 1909.

In 363 games over 5 seasons, Sebring compiled a .261 batting average (368-for-1411) with 178 runs, 6 home runs and 168 RBIs. In the 1903 World Series, he batted .333 (10-for-30) with 3 runs, 1 home run and 4 RBI. The home run was the first one in World Series history.

== See also ==
- List of baseball players who died during their careers
