= Boston Reds (1884) all-time roster =

List of baseball players

The following is a list of players who appeared in at least one game for the Boston Reds franchise, which played in the Union Association in 1884.

- β= indicates Baseball Hall of Famer.
- $= indicates that this player was also a manager.
- *= indicates that no other information is known on this player.

== B ==
- Tommy Bond
- Lew Brown
- James Burke
- Kid Butler

== C ==
- Ed Callahan
- Ed Crane

== D ==
- Charlie Daniels
- Clarence Dow

== F ==
- Joe Flynn

== H ==
- Walter Hackett

== I ==
- John Irwin

== M ==
- Tommy McCarthy β
- Jim McKeever
- Henry Mullin
- Tim Murnane $
- Murphy*

== O ==
- Tom O'Brien

== P ==
- Elias Peak

== R ==
- Charlie Reilley
- John Rudderham

== S ==
- Pat Scanlon
- Dupee Shaw
- Art Sladen
- Mike Slattery

== T ==
- Fred Tenney
