= 1884 Boston Reds season =

1884 Boston Reds
- League: Union Association
- Ballpark: Dartmouth Grounds
- City: Boston, Massachusetts
- Record: 58–51 (.532)
- League place: 3rd
- Manager: Tim Murnane

The 1884 Boston Reds finished with a 58–51 record in the Union Association, finishing in fifth place (fourth among teams that played a full schedule). This was the only season the team existed, and indeed the only season the Union Association existed.

== Regular season ==
=== Season standings ===
Union Association
Team	W	L	Pct.	GB	Home	Road
St. Louis Maroons	94	19	.832	—	49‍–‍6	45‍–‍13
Cincinnati Outlaw Reds	69	36	.657	21	35‍–‍17	34‍–‍19
Baltimore Monumentals	58	47	.552	32	29‍–‍21	29‍–‍26
Boston Reds	58	51	.532	34	34‍–‍22	24‍–‍29
Milwaukee Brewers	8	4	.667	35½	8‍–‍4	0‍–‍0
St. Paul Saints	2	6	.250	39½	0‍–‍0	2‍–‍6
Chicago Browns/Pittsburgh Stogies	41	50	.451	42	21‍–‍19	20‍–‍31
Altoona Mountain Citys	6	19	.240	44	6‍–‍12	0‍–‍7
Wilmington Quicksteps	2	16	.111	44½	1‍–‍6	1‍–‍10
Washington Nationals (UA)	47	65	.420	46½	36‍–‍27	11‍–‍38
Philadelphia Keystones	21	46	.313	50	14‍–‍21	7‍–‍25
Kansas City Cowboys	16	63	.203	61	11‍–‍23	5‍–‍40

=== Record vs. opponents ===
1884 Union Association record Sources:
Team	ALT	BLU	BSU	CUN	COR	KC	MIL	PHK	SLM	SPS	WST	WIL
Altoona	—	1–3	1–1	0–0	0–3	0–0	0–0	1–3	0–8	0–0	3–1	0–0
Baltimore	3–1	—	10–5–1	7–5	4–10	10–2	1–3	10–2	1–14	0–0	11–5	1–0
Boston	1–1	5–10–1	—	4–8–1	5–11	8–4	2–2	8–3	8–8	0–0	12–4	5–0
Chicago/Pittsburgh	0–0	5–7	8–4–1	—	7–8	12–4	0–0	3–5	2–14	0–0	4–8–1	0–0
Cincinnati	3–0	10–4	11–5	8–7	—	9–1	0–0	9–0	4–12	3–0	10–6	2–1
Kansas City	0–0	2–10	4–8	4–12	1–9	—	0–0	0–4	0–11–1	1–1–1	4–8–1	0–0
Milwaukee	0–0	3–1	2–2	0–0	0–0	0–0	—	0–0	0–0	0–0	3–1	0–0
Philadelphia	3–1	2–10	3–8	5–3	0–9	4–0	0–0	—	0–8	0–0	4–7	0–0
St. Louis	8–0	14–1	8–8	14–2	12–4	11–0–1	0–0	8–0	—	2–1	13–3	4–0
St. Paul	0–0	0–0	0–0	0–0	0–3	1–1–1	0–0	0–0	1–2	—	0–0	0–0
Washington	1–3	5–11	4–12	8–4–1	6–10	8–4–1	1–3	7–4	3–13	0–0	—	4–1
Wilmington	0–0	0–1	0–5	0–0	1–2	0–0	0–0	0–0	0–4	0–0	1–4	—

=== Roster ===
1884 Boston Reds
Roster
Pitchers: Tommy Bond; James Burke; Charlie Daniels; Dupee Shaw; Fred Tenney	Catchers: Lew Brown; Joe Flynn; Jim McKeever; Murphy; Infielders: Walter Hackett; John Irwin; Tim Murnane; Tom O'Brien	Outfielders: Kid Butler; Ed Callahan; Ed Crane; Clarence Dow; Tommy McCarthy; Henry Mullin; Elias Peak; Charlie Reilley; John Rudderham; Pat Scanlon; Art Sladen; Mike Slattery	Manager: Tim Murnane

== Player stats ==
=== Batting ===
==== Starters by position ====
Note: Pos = Position; G = Games played; AB = At bats; H = Hits; Avg. = Batting average; HR = Home runs

Pos	Player	G	AB	H	Avg.	HR
C	Lew Brown	85	325	75	.231	1
1B	Tim Murnane	76	311	73	.235	0
2B	Tom O'Brien	103	449	118	.263	4
3B	John Irwin	105	432	101	.234	1
SS	Walter Hackett	103	415	101	.243	1
OF	Kid Butler	71	255	43	.169	0
OF	Mike Slattery	106	413	86	.208	0
OF	Ed Crane	101	428	122	.285	12

==== Other batters ====
Note: G = Games played; AB = At bats; H = Hits; Avg. = Batting average; HR = Home runs

Player	G	AB	H	Avg.	HR
Tommy McCarthy	53	209	45	.215	0
Jim McKeever	16	66	9	.136	0
Joe Flynn	9	31	7	.226	0
Pat Scanlon	6	24	7	.292	0
Ed Callahan	4	13	5	.385	0
Charlie Reilley	3	11	0	.000	0
Henry Mullin	2	8	0	.000	0
Art Sladen	2	7	0	.000	0
Clarence Dow	1	6	2	.333	0
John Rudderham	1	4	1	.250	0
Elias Peak	1	4	2	.500	0
Murphy	1	3	0	.000	0

=== Pitching ===
==== Starting pitchers ====
Note: G = Games pitched; IP = Innings pitched; W = Wins; L = Losses; ERA = Earned run average; SO = Strikeouts

Player	G	IP	W	L	ERA	SO
Dupee Shaw	39	315.2	21	15	1.77	309
James Burke	38	322.0	19	15	2.85	255
Tommy Bond	23	189.0	13	9	3.00	128
Tommy McCarthy	7	56.0	0	7	4.82	18
Fred Tenney	4	35.0	3	1	2.31	18
Charlie Daniels	2	16.2	0	2	4.32	12

==== Other pitchers ====
Note: G = Games pitched; IP = Innings pitched; W = Wins; L = Losses; ERA = Earned run average; SO = Strikeouts

Player	G	IP	W	L	ERA	SO
Ed Crane	4	18.0	0	2	4.00	13

==== Relief pitchers ====
Note: G = Games pitched; W = Wins; L = Losses; SV = Saves; ERA = Earned run average; SO = Strikeouts

Player	G	W	L	SV	ERA	SO
Lew Brown	1	0	0	1	36.00	0
