= List of Major League Baseball players from Canada =

This is a list of active baseball players who hold Canadian citizenship, who have played in Major League Baseball (MLB).

== Active players ==
Player	Position	Debut	Team(s)	Birthplace	Notes
Jordan Balazovic	P	June 18, 2023	Minnesota Twins (2023)	Mississauga, ON	
Tyler Black	INF	April 30, 2024	Milwaukee Brewers (2024–)	Toronto, ON	
Matt Brash	P	April 12, 2022	Seattle Mariners (2022–)	Kingston, ON	
Owen Caissie	OF	August 14, 2025	Chicago Cubs (2025); Miami Marlins (2026–)	Burlington, ON	
Eric Cerantola	P	May 6, 2026	Kansas City Royals (2026–)	Montreal, QC	
Denzel Clarke	OF	May 23, 2025	Athletics (2025–)	Toronto, ON	
Freddie Freeman	1B	September 1, 2010	Atlanta Braves (2010–2021); Los Angeles Dodgers (2022–)	Fountain Valley, California (Note: Freeman was born in the USA to Canadian parents)	
Vladimir Guerrero Jr.	1B	April 26, 2019	Toronto Blue Jays (2019–)	Montreal, QC	
Liam Hicks	C	March 28, 2025	Miami Marlins (2025–)	Toronto, ON	
Edouard Julien	2B	April 13, 2023	Minnesota Twins (2023-25); Colorado Rockies (2026–)	Quebec City, QC	
Charles Leblanc	INF	July 30, 2022	Miami Marlins (2022); Los Angeles Angels (2024)	Laval, QC	
Otto Lopez	2B	August 17, 2021	Toronto Blue Jays (2021–2022); Miami Marlins (2024–)	Santo Domingo, Dominican Republic (Note: Lopez is a naturalized Canadian citizen)	
Bo Naylor	C	October 1, 2022	Cleveland Guardians (2022–)	Mississauga, ON	
Josh Naylor	1B	May 24, 2019	San Diego Padres (2019–2020); Cleveland Indians / Guardians (2020–2024); Arizona Diamondbacks (2025); Seattle Mariners (2025–)	Mississauga, ON	
Tyler O'Neill	OF	April 19, 2018	St. Louis Cardinals (2018–2023); Boston Red Sox (2024); Baltimore Orioles (2025–)	Burnaby, BC	
Tristan Peters	OF	August 8, 2025	Tampa Bay Rays (2025); Chicago White Sox (2026–)	Winkler, MB	
Nick Pivetta	P	April 30, 2017	Philadelphia Phillies (2017–2020); Boston Red Sox (2020–2024); San Diego Padres (2025–)	Victoria, BC	
Zach Pop	P	April 3, 2021	Miami Marlins (2021–2022); Toronto Blue Jays (2022–2024); Seattle Mariners (2025); New York Mets (2025); Philadelphia Phillies (2026–)	Brampton, ON	
Cal Quantrill	P	May 1, 2019	San Diego Padres (2019–2020); Cleveland Indians / Guardians (2020–23); Colorado Rockies (2024); Miami Marlins (2025); Atlanta Braves (2025); Texas Rangers (2026–)	Port Hope, ON	
Jordan Romano	P	June 12, 2019	Toronto Blue Jays (2019–2024); Philadelphia Phillies (2025); Los Angeles Angels (2026–)	Markham, ON	
Erik Sabrowski	P	September 4, 2024	Cleveland Guardians (2024–)	Edmonton, AB	
Cade Smith	P	March 24, 2024	Cleveland Guardians (2024–)	Abbotsford, BC	
Mike Soroka	P	May 1, 2018	Atlanta Braves (2018–2023); Chicago White Sox (2024); Washington Nationals (2025); Chicago Cubs (2025); Arizona Diamondbacks (2026–)	Calgary, AB	
Jameson Taillon	P	June 8, 2016	Pittsburgh Pirates (2016–2019); New York Yankees (2021–2022); Chicago Cubs (2023–)	Lakeland, Florida (Note: Taillon was born in the USA to Canadian parents)	
Jonah Tong	P	August 29, 2025	New York Mets (2025–)	Markham, ON	
Abraham Toro	3B	August 22, 2019	Houston Astros (2019–2021); Seattle Mariners (2021–2022); Milwaukee Brewers (2023); Oakland Athletics (2024)	Longueuil, QC	
Rowan Wick	P	August 31, 2018	San Diego Padres (2018); Chicago Cubs (2019–2022)	North Vancouver, BC	
Matt Wilkinson	P	August 19, 2026	San Francisco Giants (2026–)	Vancouver, BC	
Jared Young	2B	September 16, 2022	Chicago Cubs (2022–2023); New York Mets (2025)	Prince George, BC	
Rob Zastryzny	P	August 19, 2016	Chicago Cubs (2016–2018); New York Mets (2022); Los Angeles Angels (2022); Pittsburgh Pirates (2023); Milwaukee Brewers (2024–)	Edmonton, AB	

== Awards and notable accomplishments ==
Baseball Hall of Fame

- Ferguson Jenkins, 1991
- Larry Walker, 2020

Most Valuable Player Award

- Larry Walker, 1997 NL
- Justin Morneau, 2006 AL
- Joey Votto, 2010 NL
- Freddie Freeman, 2020 NL

Cy Young Award

- Ferguson Jenkins, 1971 NL
- Éric Gagné, 2003 NL

Rookie of the Year Award

- Jason Bay, 2004 NL

Silver Slugger Award

- Larry Walker, 1992, 1997, 1999 NL
- Freddie Freeman, 2019, 2020, 2021 NL
- Justin Morneau, 2006, 2008 AL
- Jason Bay, 2009 AL
- Russell Martin, 2007 NL
- Vladimir Guerrero Jr., 2021, 2024 AL

Gold Glove

- Larry Walker, 1992, 1993, 1997, 1998, 1999, 2001, 2002 NL
- Russell Martin, 2007 NL
- Joey Votto, 2011 NL
- Freddie Freeman, 2018 NL
- Tyler O'Neill, 2020, 2021 NL
- Vladimir Guerrero Jr., 2022 AL

Hank Aaron Award

- Joey Votto, 2010 NL
- Vladimir Guerrero Jr., 2021 AL

Rolaids Relief Man Award

- Éric Gagné, 2003, 2004 NL
- John Axford, 2011 NL

Batting Champion

- Larry Walker, 1998, 1999, 2001 NL
- Tip O'Neill, 1887, 1888 AA
- Justin Morneau, 2014 NL

Home Run Champion

- Larry Walker, 1997 NL
- Vladimir Guerrero Jr., 2021 AL

Triples Champion

- Jeff Heath, 2 times, 1938, 1941 AL

Home Run Derby Winner

- Justin Morneau, 2008
- Vladimir Guerrero Jr., 2023

All-MLB Team

- Freddie Freeman, 2019 NL 2nd Team (1B), 2020 NL 1st Team (1B), 2021 NL 2nd Team (1B), 2022 Team 2nd Team (1B), 2023 NL 1st Team (1B)
- Mike Soroka, 2019 NL 2nd Team (SP)
- Vladimir Guerrero Jr., 2021 AL 1st Team (1B), 2024 AL 1st Team (1B)

== All-Star Selection ==
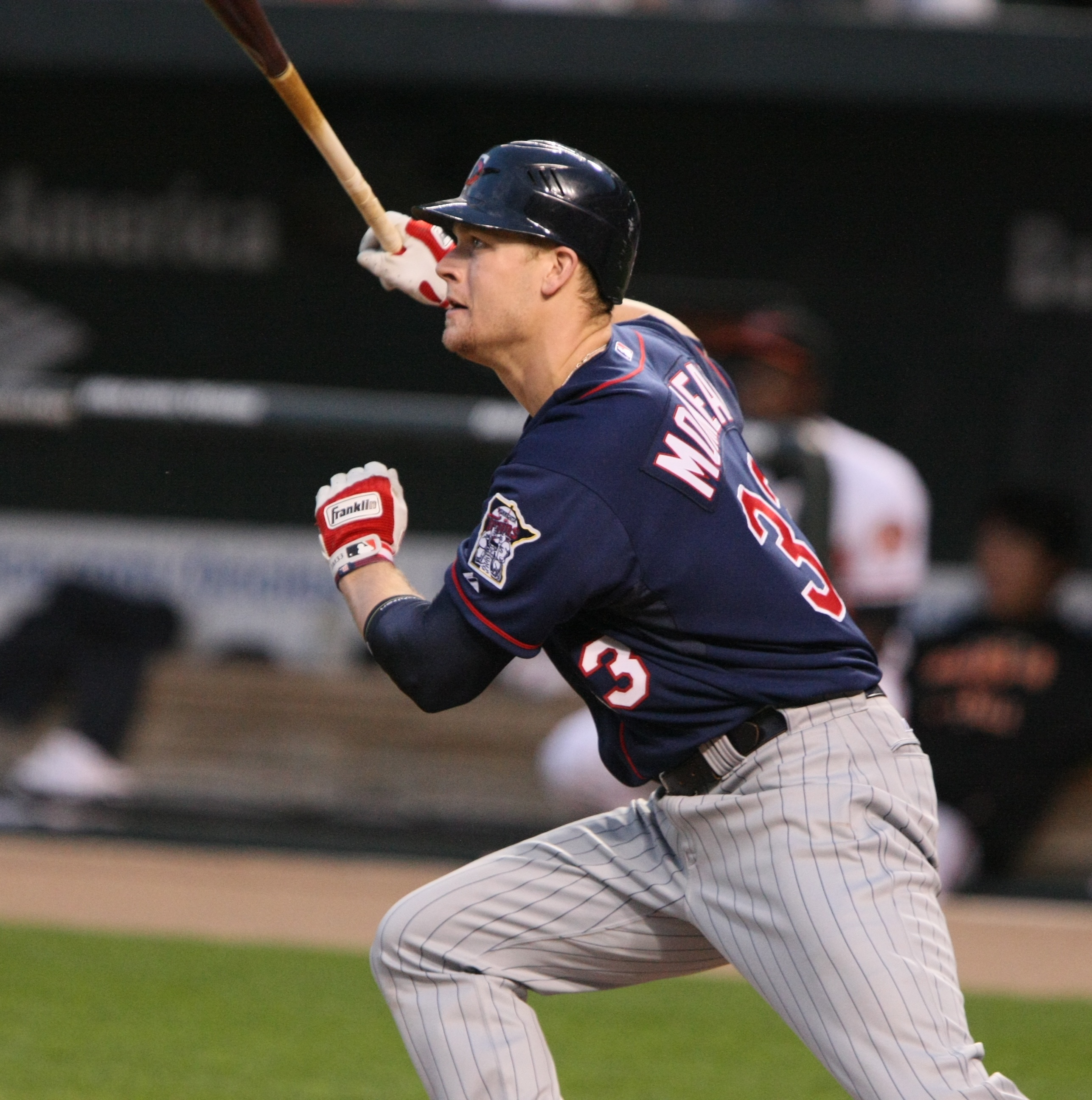
Justin Morneau

- Freddie Freeman, 9 times, 2013, 2014, 2018, 2019, 2021, 2022, 2023, 2024 and 2025 NL
- Joey Votto, 6 times, 2010, 2011, 2012, 2013, 2017 and 2018 NL
- Vladimir Guerrero Jr., 5 times, 2021, 2022, 2023, 2024 and 2025 AL
- Larry Walker, 5 times, 1992, 1997, 1998, 1999 and 2001 NL
- Justin Morneau, 4 times, 2007, 2008, 2009 and 2010 AL
- Russell Martin, 4 times, 2007 and 2008 NL, 2011 and 2015 AL
- Jason Bay, 3 times, 2005, 2006 NL, 2009 AL
- Éric Gagné, 3 times, 2002, 2003 and 2004 NL
- Ferguson Jenkins, 3 times 1967, 1971, 1972 NL
- Jeff Heath, 3 times, 1941, 1943, 1945 (game not held) AL
- Jordan Romano, 2 times, 2022 and 2023 AL
- Ryan Dempster, 2 times, 2000 and 2008 NL
- George Selkirk, 2 times, 1936 and 1939 AL
- Terry Puhl, 1978 NL
- Paul Quantrill, 2001 AL
- Claude Raymond, 1966 NL
- Jeff Zimmerman, 1999 NL
- Jason Dickson, 1997 AL
- Michael Saunders, 2016 AL
- Mike Soroka, 2019 NL
- John Hiller, 1974 AL
- Jesse Crain, 2013 AL
- Goody Rosen, 1945 NL
- Oscar Judd, 1943 AL

== Players ==
This is an alphabetical list of 258 baseball players from Canada who have played in Major League Baseball since 1871.

== A ==
- Jim Adduci
- Bob Addy
- Andrew Albers
- Bob Alexander
- Wiman Andrus
- Bill Atkinson
- Derek Aucoin
- Phillippe Aumont
- John Axford

== B ==
- Ed Bahr
- John Balaz
- Jordan Balazovic
- Vince Barton
- Jason Bay
- Érik Bédard
- Reno Bertoia
- Tyler Black
- Denis Boucher
- Ted Bowsfield
- Matt Brash
- Ryan Braun
- Tom Burgess
- Rich Butler
- Rob Butler
- Ralph Buxton

== C ==
- Owen Caissie
- Paul Calvert
- Jack "Happy Jack" Cameron
- Bob Casey
- Stubby Clapp
- Denzel Clarke
- Nig Clarke
- Jimmy Claxton
- Reggie Cleveland
- Jim Cockman
- Chub Collins
- Frank Colman
- Bunk Congalton
- Earl Cook
- Rhéal Cormier
- Barry Cort
- Pete Craig
- Jesse Crain
- Ken Crosby
- Clarence Currie
- Éric Cyr

== D ==
- Tom Daly
- Ray Daviault
- Dave Davidson
- Shorty Dee
- Fred Demarais
- Ryan Dempster
- Scott Diamond
- Jason Dickson
- John Doyle
- Rob Ducey
- Gus Dugas
- Steve Dunn

== E ==
- Bob Emslie
- Joe Erautt

== F ==
- Harry Fisher
- Gene Ford
- Russ Ford
- Dick Fowler
- Jeff Francis
- Freddie Freeman
- Doug Frobel

== G ==
- Éric Gagné
- Mike Gardiner
- Alex Gardner
- George Gibson
- Roland Gladu
- Glen Gorbous
- Jack Graney
- Jason Green
- Steve Green
- Taylor Green
- Vladimir Guerrero Jr.
- Aaron Guiel

== H ==
- Vern Handrahan
- Pat Hannivan
- Rich Harden
- Alex Hardy
- Tim Harkness
- Bill Harris
- Tom Harrison
- Blake Hawksworth
- Jeff Heath
- Jim Henderson
- Liam Hicks
- Shawn Hill
- John Hiller
- Paul Hodgson
- Bob Hooper
- Vince Horsman
- Peter Hoy
- John Humphries
- Bill Hunter

== I ==
- Arthur Irwin
- John Irwin

== J ==
- Ferguson Jenkins
- Abbie Johnson
- Mike Johnson
- Spud Johnson
- Bill Jones
- Mike Jones
- Oscar Judd
- Edouard Julien

== K ==
- Win Kellum
- Mel Kerr
- Mike Kilkenny
- Danny Klassen
- Joe Knight
- Jimmy Knowles
- George Korince
- Corey Koskie
- George Kottaras
- Joe Krakauskas
- Andy Kyle

== L ==
- Pete Laforest
- Ty LaForest
- Fred Lake
- Larry Landreth
- Sam LaRocque
- Ron Law
- Jim Lawrence
- Brett Lawrie
- Charles Leblanc
- Pete LePine
- Chris Leroux
- Dick Lines
- Rick Lisi
- Adam Loewen
- Red Long
- Otto Lopez
- Pat Lyons

== M ==
- Eric Mackenzie
- Ken MacKenzie
- Bill Magee
- Trystan Magnuson
- Georges Maranda
- Phil Marchildon
- Russell Martin
- Scott Mathieson
- Matt Maysey
- Ralph McCabe
- Kirk McCaskill
- Art McGovern
- Cody McKay
- Dave McKay
- Jim McKeever
- Larry McLean
- Charlie Mead
- Chris Mears
- Doc Miller
- Dustin Molleken
- Jerry Moore
- Justin Morneau
- Jon Morrison
- Bill Mountjoy
- Henry Mullin
- Larry Murphy
- Aaron Myette

== N ==
- Bo Naylor
- Josh Naylor
- Kevin Nicholson
- Mike Nickeas
- The Only Nolan

== O ==
- John O'Brien
- Dan O'Connor
- Greg O'Halloran
- Bill O'Hara
- Bill O'Neill
- Fred O'Neill
- Harry O'Neill
- Tip O'Neill
- Tyler O'Neill
- Frank O'Rourke
- Pete Orr
- Fred Osborne
- Brian Ostrosser
- Frank Owens
- Henry Oxley

== P ==
- Dave Pagan
- James Paxton
- Tristan Peters
- Bill Pfann
- Bill Phillips
- Ron Piché
- Ed Pinnance
- Jim Pirie
- Nick Pivetta
- Gordie Pladson
- Dalton Pompey
- Simon Pond
- Zach Pop
- Terry Puhl

== Q ==
- Cal Quantrill
- Paul Quantrill

== R ==
- Ryan Radmanovich
- Newt Randall
- Claude Raymond
- Billy Reid
- Kevin Reimer
- Scott Richmond
- Jim Riley
- Sherry Robertson
- Chris Robinson
- Jacob Robson
- Jamie Romak
- Jordan Romano
- Goody Rosen
- Ernie Ross
- Phil Routcliffe
- Dave Rowan
- Jean-Pierre Roy
- Johnny Rutherford

== S ==
- Michael Saunders
- Patrick Scanlon
- George Selkirk
- Harvey Shank
- Vince Shields
- Dave Shipanoff
- Joe Siddall
- Steve Sinclair
- Bert Sincock
- Bud Sketchley
- Frank Smith
- Cade Smith
- Pop Smith
- Cooney Snyder
- Mike Soroka
- Paul Spoljaric
- Ed Springer
- Max St. Pierre
- Matt Stairs
- Bob Steele
- Adam Stern
- Andy Stewart
- Kid Summers
- R. J. Swindle

== T ==
- Jameson Taillon
- Oscar Taveras
- Ron Taylor
- Jesen Therrien
- Tug Thompson
- Scott Thorman
- Jonah Tong
- Abraham Toro
- Rene Tosoni

== U ==
- John Upham

== V ==
- Gene Vadeboncoeur
- Ozzie Van Brabant
- Joey Votto

== W ==
- Dave Wainhouse
- George Walker
- Larry Walker
- Pete Ward
- Bill Watkins
- Joe Weber
- Milt Whitehead
- Rowan Wick
- Lefty Wilkie
- Nigel Wilson
- Steve Wilson
- Ed Wingo
- Fred Wood
- George Wood
- Pete Wood

== Z ==
- Rob Zastryzny
- Jeff Zimmerman
- Jordan Zimmerman
