= Charlie Berry (second baseman) =

American baseball player (1860–1940)

- Second baseman
- Born: September 6, 1860; Elizabeth, New Jersey
- Died: January 22, 1940 (aged 79); Phillipsburg, New Jersey
- Batted: Right Threw: Right

MLB debut
- April 30, 1884, for the Altoona Mountain City

Last MLB appearance
- August 27, 1884, for the Pittsburgh Stogies

MLB statistics
- Batting average: .224
- Home runs: 1
- Runs scored: 21
- Stats at Baseball Reference

Teams
- Altoona Mountain City (1884); Kansas City Cowboys (1884); Chicago Browns/Pittsburgh Stogies (1884)

Charles Joseph Berry (September 6, 1860 – January 22, 1940) was an American second baseman in Major League Baseball whose career consisted of one season in the Union Association. He was born in Elizabeth, New Jersey.

In his one-season, Berry batted .224 (38-for-170) with one home run and 21 runs in 43 games played. After the conclusion of his professional sports career, he worked for the Ingersoll Rand Company.

Berry died in Phillipsburg, New Jersey at the age of 79, and was buried at the Mount Olivet Cemetery in Elizabeth, New Jersey.

His son, Charlie Jr., was more successful in professional sports. He played both baseball and football on a major league level and later became an American League umpire and a head linesman for the NFL.

== See also ==
- List of second-generation Major League Baseball players
