= Lou Galvin =

American baseball player (1863–1916)

- Pitcher
- Born: April 23, 1863; St. Paul, Minnesota, U.S.
- Died: August 25, 1916 (aged 53); Los Angeles, California, U.S.
- Batted: Unknown Threw: Unknown

MLB debut
- October 1, 1884, for the St. Paul Saints

Last MLB appearance
- October 12, 1884, for the St. Paul Saints

MLB statistics
- Win–loss record: 0–2
- Earned run average: 2.88
- Strikeouts: 17
- Stats at Baseball Reference

Teams
- St. Paul Saints (1884)

James Louis Galvin (April 23, 1863 - August 25, 1916) was an American Major League Baseball pitcher who played with the St. Paul Saints of the Union Association.

== Career ==
Galvin played with the St. Paul Red Caps in 1883. By 1884, he joined the St. Paul Saints of the Northwestern League, and appeared in nine games as a pitcher and 22 games as an outfielder.

When St. Paul joined the Union Association in late September, Galvin remained with the club and appeared in three games from October 1 to October 12. The Kansas City Star described him as "one of the swiftest pitchers in the country" at the time.

In 1885, Galvin played for Springfield in the Interstate League, Omaha Omahogs and Keokuk Hawkeyes of the Western League and Haverhill and Lawrence of the Eastern New England League. In his last professional season of 1886, he played for the Oswego club of the International League, and the Meriden, Connecticut club.

In October 1886, he accepted a job at a boot and shoe establishment in Haverhill.

== Personal life ==
Galvin's father, Henry, worked as a police officer in St. Paul, Minnesota for 30 years. Galvin himself later became a patrolman.

Galvin was not related to future Baseball Hall of Fame pitcher Pud Galvin, who at the time was pitching for the Buffalo Bisons. Some newspaper accounts in October 1884 initially identified the two as brothers.
