= John Tilley (baseball) =

American baseball player (1854–1927)

- Left fielder
- Born: August 1854; New York, New York, U.S.
- Died: March 6, 1927 (aged 72); Newark, New Jersey, U.S.
- Batted: Right Threw: Unknown

MLB debut
- August 23, 1882, for the Cleveland Blues

Last MLB appearance
- October 13, 1884, for the St. Paul White Caps

MLB statistics
- Batting average: .138
- Home runs: 0
- Runs batted in: 4
- Stats at Baseball Reference

Teams
- Cleveland Blues (1882); Toledo Blue Stockings (1884); St. Paul White Caps (1884)

John C. Tilley (August 1854 – March 6, 1927) was an American left fielder in professional baseball. He played in Major League Baseball for the 1882 Cleveland Blues of the National League, the 1884 Toledo Blue Stockings of the American Association, and the 1884 St. Paul White Caps of the Union Association.
