= Kid Butler =

Kid Butler could refer to:

- Kid Butler (outfielder), (1861–1921), 19th century baseball outfielder for the 1884 Boston Reds
- Kid Butler (infielder), (1887–1964), baseball infielder for the 1907 St. Louis Browns
