= Pat Carroll (baseball) =

American baseball player (1853–1916)

- Catcher
- Born: March 1853; Philadelphia, Pennsylvania, U.S.
- Died: February 14, 1916 (aged 62); Philadelphia, Pennsylvania, U.S.
- Batted: Unknown Threw: Unknown

MLB debut
- May 10, 1884, for the Altoona Mountain City

Last MLB appearance
- August 7, 1884, for the Philadelphia Keystones

MLB statistics
- Batting average: .235
- Home runs: 0
- Runs batted in: 0
- Stats at Baseball Reference

Teams
- Altoona Mountain City (1884); Philadelphia Keystones (1884)

Patrick (Pat) Carroll (March, 1853 – February 14, 1916) was an American Major League Baseball catcher who played for the Altoona Mountain City and the Philadelphia Keystones, both of the Union Association, in 1884.

In 16 total games he was 16-for-68 (.235) and scored 5 runs. He was a slightly below-average defensive catcher for his era, making 13 errors in 106 total chances (.877). In three of his games, Carroll was a right fielder, and made no errors while playing that position.

He died in his hometown of Philadelphia, Pennsylvania.
