= George Noftsker =

American baseball player (1859–1931)

- Outfielder / Catcher
- Born: August 24, 1859; Shippensburg, Pennsylvania, U.S.
- Died: May 8, 1931 (aged 71); Shippensburg, Pennsylvania, U.S.
- Batted: Right Threw: Right

MLB debut
- April 17, 1884, for the Altoona Mountain City

Last MLB appearance
- May 2, 1884, for the Altoona Mountain City

MLB statistics
- Batting average: .040
- Home runs: 0
- Runs scored: 0
- Stats at Baseball Reference

Teams
- Altoona Mountain City (1884)

George Washington Noftsker (August 24, 1859 – May 8, 1931) was a 19th-century American Major League Baseball player born in Shippensburg, Pennsylvania. He played in just one season, splitting time between the outfield and catcher for the 1884 Altoona Mountain City of the Union Association. George had one base hit in 25 at bats for a .040 batting average in seven games played. George died in his hometown of Shippensburg at the age of 71 and is interred at Spring Hill Cemetery.
