= James Harris (baseball) =

American baseball player (1858–1939)

- First baseman / Outfielder
- Born: November 2, 1858; Pittsburgh, Pennsylvania, U.S.
- Died: November 26, 1939 (aged 81); East Moline, Illinois, U.S.
- Batted: Right Threw: Right

MLB debut
- April 17, 1884, for the Altoona Mountain City

Last MLB appearance
- May 31, 1884, for the Altoona Mountain City

MLB statistics
- Batting average: .263
- Home runs: 0
- Runs scored: 10
- Stats at Baseball Reference

Teams
- Altoona Mountain City (1884)

James Harris (November 2, 1858 – November 26, 1939) was an American infielder in Major League Baseball. Harris played in 24 games for the Altoona Mountain Citys of the Union Association in 1884.

== Sources ==
- Career statistics from Baseball Reference · Baseball Reference (Minors) · Retrosheet · Baseball Almanac
