= Joe Connors =

American baseball player (1862–1891)

- Outfielder/Pitcher
- Born: 1862; Paterson, New Jersey
- Died: January 13, 1891; Denver, Colorado
- Batted: Unknown Threw: Unknown

MLB debut
- May 3, 1884, for the Altoona Mountain City

Last MLB appearance
- June 15, 1884, for the Kansas City Cowboys

MLB statistics
- Win–loss record: 0–2
- Earned run average: 5.57
- Strikeouts: 1
- Stats at Baseball Reference

Teams
- Altoona Mountain City (1884); Kansas City Cowboys (1884)

Joseph P. Connors (1862 – January 13, 1891) was a 19th-century professional baseball pitcher. He pitched for two different teams in the Union Association in 1884.

== Sources ==
- Career statistics from Baseball Reference · Baseball Reference (Minors) · Retrosheet
