= 1884 St. Louis Maroons season =

1884 St. Louis Maroons
- 1884 Union Association Champions
- League: Union Association
- Ballpark: Union Base Ball Park
- City: St. Louis, Missouri
- Record: 94–19 (.832)
- League place: 1st
- Owner: Henry Lucas
- Managers: Ted Sullivan, Fred Dunlap

The 1884 St. Louis Maroons baseball team finished with a 94–19 record and won the championship of the new Union Association (UA). After the season, the UA folded and the Maroons joined the National League; they were the only UA team to continue past the 1884 season.

To this day, the Maroons' .832 winning percentage hasn't been matched by a professional baseball team. However, a number of factors have often led to the Maroons' season being questioned or disregarded as a true accomplishment, including: the relatively low number of games played; the debate over the classification of the Union Association as a "major league"; and the fact that the founder and president of the Union Association was also the owner of the Maroons, and deliberately (and anti-competitively) stocked his team with most of the league's best talent. Accordingly, the 1884 St. Louis Maroons are not usually mentioned in the conversation of baseball teams with the best single-season records of all time.

This team also set the record for the best start to a season in baseball history, going 20–0 before losing 8–1 to the Boston Reds on May 24, in their 21st game of the season.

The Maroons scored 887 runs while allowing 429, for a run differential of +458, the best in major-league history, as records and statistics of the UA are recognized by Major League Baseball (MLB).

The team was back in the news in 2015, when the Golden State Warriors started the 2015–16 season with an NBA-record 24 straight wins; this surpassed the Maroons' 20–0 start, which was previously the record for the four major professional sports leagues in the United States.

== Regular season ==
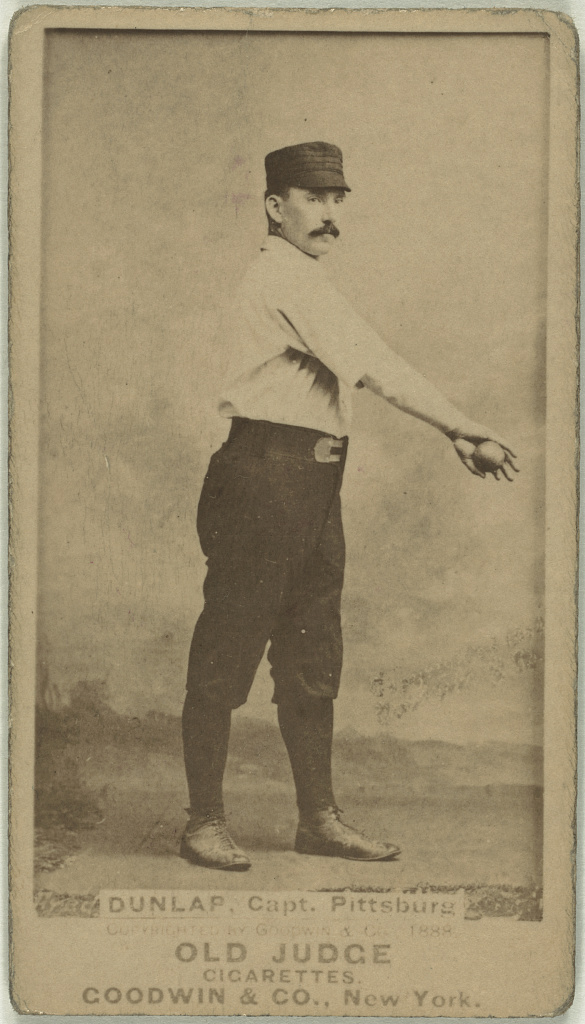
Second baseman Fred Dunlap

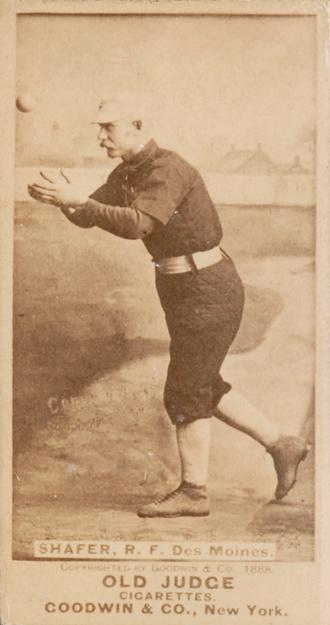
Right fielder Orator Shafer

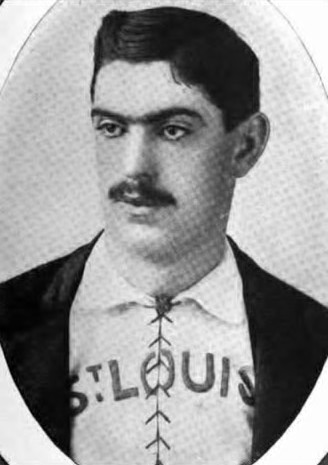
Pitcher Charlie Sweeney

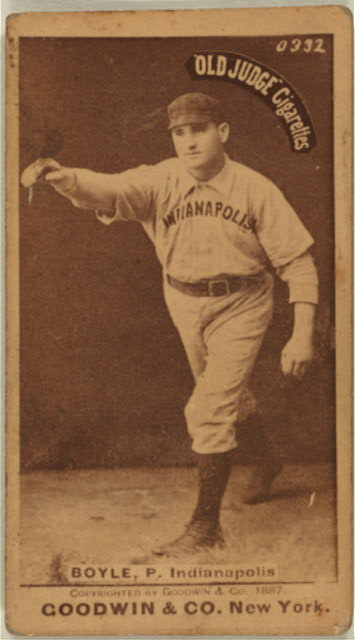
Left fielder Henry Boyle

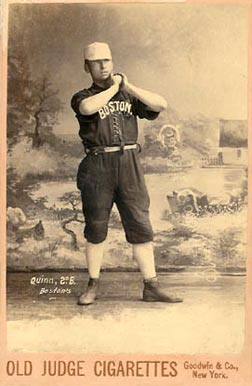
First baseman Joe Quinn

=== Season standings ===
Union Association
Team	W	L	Pct.	GB	Home	Road
St. Louis Maroons	94	19	.832	—	49‍–‍6	45‍–‍13
Cincinnati Outlaw Reds	69	36	.657	21	35‍–‍17	34‍–‍19
Baltimore Monumentals	58	47	.552	32	29‍–‍21	29‍–‍26
Boston Reds	58	51	.532	34	34‍–‍22	24‍–‍29
Milwaukee Brewers	8	4	.667	35½	8‍–‍4	0‍–‍0
St. Paul Saints	2	6	.250	39½	0‍–‍0	2‍–‍6
Chicago Browns/Pittsburgh Stogies	41	50	.451	42	21‍–‍19	20‍–‍31
Altoona Mountain Citys	6	19	.240	44	6‍–‍12	0‍–‍7
Wilmington Quicksteps	2	16	.111	44½	1‍–‍6	1‍–‍10
Washington Nationals (UA)	47	65	.420	46½	36‍–‍27	11‍–‍38
Philadelphia Keystones	21	46	.313	50	14‍–‍21	7‍–‍25
Kansas City Cowboys	16	63	.203	61	11‍–‍23	5‍–‍40

=== Record vs. opponents ===
1884 Union Association record Sources:
Team	ALT	BLU	BSU	CUN	COR	KC	MIL	PHK	SLM	SPS	WST	WIL
Altoona	—	1–3	1–1	0–0	0–3	0–0	0–0	1–3	0–8	0–0	3–1	0–0
Baltimore	3–1	—	10–5–1	7–5	4–10	10–2	1–3	10–2	1–14	0–0	11–5	1–0
Boston	1–1	5–10–1	—	4–8–1	5–11	8–4	2–2	8–3	8–8	0–0	12–4	5–0
Chicago/Pittsburgh	0–0	5–7	8–4–1	—	7–8	12–4	0–0	3–5	2–14	0–0	4–8–1	0–0
Cincinnati	3–0	10–4	11–5	8–7	—	9–1	0–0	9–0	4–12	3–0	10–6	2–1
Kansas City	0–0	2–10	4–8	4–12	1–9	—	0–0	0–4	0–11–1	1–1–1	4–8–1	0–0
Milwaukee	0–0	3–1	2–2	0–0	0–0	0–0	—	0–0	0–0	0–0	3–1	0–0
Philadelphia	3–1	2–10	3–8	5–3	0–9	4–0	0–0	—	0–8	0–0	4–7	0–0
St. Louis	8–0	14–1	8–8	14–2	12–4	11–0–1	0–0	8–0	—	2–1	13–3	4–0
St. Paul	0–0	0–0	0–0	0–0	0–3	1–1–1	0–0	0–0	1–2	—	0–0	0–0
Washington	1–3	5–11	4–12	8–4–1	6–10	8–4–1	1–3	7–4	3–13	0–0	—	4–1
Wilmington	0–0	0–1	0–5	0–0	1–2	0–0	0–0	0–0	0–4	0–0	1–4	—

=== Roster ===
1884 St. Louis Maroons
Roster
Pitchers: John Cattanach; Charlie Hodnett; C. V. Matteson; William Sullivan; Charlie Sweeney; Billy Taylor; Perry Werden	Catchers: George Baker; Jack Brennan; Tom Dolan; Infielders: Fred Dunlap; Jack Gleason; Joe Quinn; Milt Whitehead	Outfielders: Henry Boyle; Ed Callahan; Dan Cronin; Buttercup Dickerson; Fred Lewis; Dave Rowe; Tom Ryder; Orator Shafer; Sleeper Sullivan	Manager: Fred Dunlap; Ted Sullivan

== Player stats ==
=== Batting ===
==== Starters by position ====
Note: Pos = Position; G = Games played; AB = At bats; H = Hits; Avg. = Batting average; HR = Home runs

Pos	Player	G	AB	H	Avg.	HR
C	George Baker	80	317	52	.164	0
1B	Joe Quinn	103	429	116	.270	0
2B	Fred Dunlap	101	449	185	.412	13
SS	Milt Whitehead	99	393	83	.211	1
3B	Jack Gleason	92	395	128	.324	4
OF	Orator Shafer	106	467	168	.360	2
OF	Dave Rowe	109	485	142	.293	4
OF	Henry Boyle	65	262	68	.260	4

==== Other batters ====
Note: G = Games played; AB = At bats; H = Hits; Avg. = Batting average; HR = Home runs

Player	G	AB	H	Avg.	HR
Jack Brennan	56	231	50	.216	0
Buttercup Dickerson	46	211	77	.365	0
Tom Dolan	19	69	13	.188	0
Tom Ryder	8	28	7	.250	0
Sleeper Sullivan	2	9	1	.111	0

=== Pitching ===
==== Starting pitchers ====
Note: G = Games pitched; IP = Innings pitched; W = Wins; L = Losses; ERA = Earned run average; SO = Strikeouts

Player	G	IP	W	L	ERA	SO
Charlie Sweeney	33	271.0	24	7	1.83	192
Billy Taylor	33	263.0	25	4	1.68	154
Henry Boyle	19	150.0	15	3	1.74	88
Perry Werden	16	141.1	12	1	1.97	51
Charlie Hodnett	14	121.0	12	2	2.01	41
John Cattanach	2	17.0	1	1	2.12	13
Dave Rowe	1	9.0	1	0	2.00	2
Milt Whitehead	1	8.0	0	1	9.00	2
C. V. Matteson	1	6.0	1	0	9.00	3
Sleeper Sullivan	1	6.0	1	0	4.50	3

==== Relief pitchers ====
Note: G = Games pitched; IP = Innings pitched; W = Wins; L = Losses; ERA = Earned run average; SO = Strikeouts

Player	G	W	L	SV	ERA	SO
Fred Dunlap	1	0	0	1	13.50	1

== Sources ==
- 1884 St. Louis Maroons team page at Baseball Reference

Preceded by League created	Union Association Championship Season; 1884	Succeeded by League dissolved
