= Ed Curtis (baseball) =

American baseball manager

Edwin Russell Curtis (August 29, 1843 – August 6, 1914) was an American manager in Major League Baseball who led the Altoona Mountain Citys of the Union Association during that league's only season in 1884. The team played only 25 games before folding in May, with his record standing at 6 and 19, coming in 10th place out of 12 teams. Curtis was born in Hartford, Connecticut, and died at age 70 in Bath, New York.

Curtis ran a bookstore in Altoona and from that base he organized the Altoona team.
