= Jim Brown (pitcher) =

American baseball player (1860–1908)

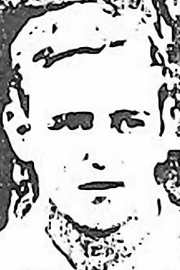
- Pitcher / Outfielder
- Born: December 12, 1860; Clinton County, Pennsylvania, U.S.
- Died: April 6, 1908 (aged 47); Williamsport, Pennsylvania, U.S.
- Batted: Unknown Threw: Unknown

MLB debut
- April 17, 1884, for the Altoona Mountain City

Last MLB appearance
- July 28, 1886, for the Philadelphia Athletics

MLB statistics
- Win–loss record: 2–15
- Earned run average: 4.74
- Strikeouts: 65
- Stats at Baseball Reference

Teams
- Altoona Mountain City (1884); New York Gothams (1884); St. Paul Saints (1884); Philadelphia Athletics (1886)

James W. H. Brown (December 12, 1860 – April 6, 1908) was an American Major League Baseball pitcher and outfielder for two seasons, 1884 and 1886. In 1884, he played for the Altoona Mountain City and St. Paul Saints, both of the Union Association, and played in one game for the New York Gothams of the National League. Two years later, in 1886, he played in one game for the Philadelphia Athletics of the American Association.

In 19 games as a starting pitcher, Brown won 2, lost 15, and pitched 13 complete games. His earned run average was 4.74. He also made some appearances in the outfield and one at first base, giving him a total of 29 games played at the major league level. He batted .245 (27-for-110) with 17 runs scored.

A native of Clinton County, Pennsylvania, he died at the age of 47 in Williamsport, Pennsylvania, and is interred at Highland Cemetery in Lock Haven, Pennsylvania.
