= Frank Schaefer =

Frank Schaefer or Schaeffer may refer to:

- Frank Schaefer (football manager) (born 1963), German football manager
- Frank Schaefer (minister) (born 1961), German-American author and LGBTQ advocate
- Frank Schaeffer (born 1952), American author and film director
- Frank E. Schaeffer Jr. (1905–1977), member of the Wisconsin State Assembly

== See also ==
- Frank Schaffer (born 1958), East German athlete
- Frank Schäffer (1952–2024), German footballer
- Frank Scheffer (born 1956), Dutch cinematographer and producer
- Frank Shaffer (1859–1939), American baseball player
- Francis Schaeffer (1912-1984), American pastor
