= Joe Werrick =

American baseball player (1861–1943)

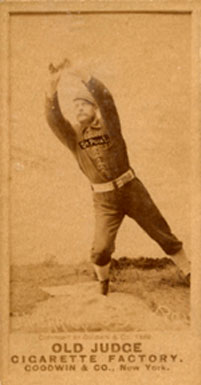
- Third baseman
- Born: October 25, 1861; Saint Paul, Minnesota, U.S.
- Died: May 10, 1943 (aged 81); St. Peter, Minnesota, U.S.
- Batted: Right Threw: Right

MLB debut
- October 27, 1884, for the St. Paul Saints

Last MLB appearance
- October 14, 1888, for the Louisville Colonels

MLB statistics
- Batting average: .250
- Home runs: 10
- Runs scored: 217
- Stats at Baseball Reference

Teams
- St. Paul Saints (1884); Louisville Colonels (1886–88)

Joseph Abraham Werrick (October 25, 1861 – May 10, 1943) was an American professional baseball third baseman. He played in Major League Baseball for four seasons in the 19th century.

Werrick made his professional debut in 1884 for the Winona Clippers of the minor Northwestern League. Partway through the season, he moved on to that league's St. Paul Saints. Later that year, the Saints joined the Union Association as a late-season replacement, and Werrick made his major league debut, playing nine games.

After the UA folded, Werrick returned to the minor leagues. After playing for the Nashville Americans of the original Southern League in 1885, he returned to the major leagues in 1886 with the American Association's Louisville Colonels. He spent three seasons as the Colonels' regular third baseman, being replaced late in 1888 by Harry Raymond.

Werrick continued to play professionally, returning to St. Paul to play for the Western Association Apostles in 1889. He finished his career in 1899 with the Dayton Veterans of the Interstate League.

== Sources ==
- Career statistics from Baseball Reference · Baseball Reference (Minors) · Retrosheet · Baseball Almanac
