= Jim McKeever (baseball) =

American baseball player (1861–1897)

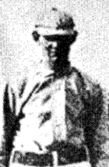
- Catcher
- Born: April 19, 1861; Saint John, New Brunswick, Canada
- Died: August 19, 1897 (aged 36); Boston, Massachusetts, U.S.
- Batted: Right Threw: Unknown

MLB debut
- April 17, 1884, for the Boston Reds

Last MLB appearance
- July 11, 1884, for the Boston Reds

MLB statistics
- Batting average: .136
- Home runs: 0
- Runs scored: 13
- Stats at Baseball Reference

Teams
- Boston Reds (1884)

James McKeever (April 19, 1861 – August 19, 1897) was an American professional baseball catcher. He played in Major League Baseball for the Boston Reds in 1884.

== Early life ==
McKeever was born in 1861 in Saint John, New Brunswick, the son of Irish immigrants. He moved to Boston with his parents at age three. He was boyhood friends in South Boston with Tommy McCarthy, who was later inducted into the Baseball Hall of Fame. He graduated from the Lawrence School in Boston in 1875 and became employed by the Norway Iron Company.

== Baseball career ==
McKeever played baseball "as a business" for several years for teams in the Boston area.

In April 1884, he signed with the Boston Reds in the Union Association. The Baltimore Sun reported that McKeever was working at a South Boston foundry before signing his first professional contract with the Reds. The Boston Globe reported that he was "a large man with no previous pro experience" who would be positioned at catcher and serve as one half of Boston's "change battery" with pitcher Charlie Daniels. A biography of McKeever in The National Pastime described him as "a strong defensive catcher" who was "unable to hit successfully against the suspect UA pitching." During his major-league career, he appeared in 16 games and scored 13 runs with a .136 batting average, before he was released along with Fred Tenney in August.

McKeever later played for several years for clubs in Biddeford, Maine (1885), Waterbury (1885), Minneapolis (1887), Eau Claire, Wisconsin (1887), Easton, Pennsylvania (1888), Haverhill, Massachusetts, Lowell, Massachusetts, and Oil City, Pennsylvania (1895). He also later played for the Boston-based clubs Woven Hose in 1890, the Whittentons in 1891, and Institute in 1893.

He played principally at the catcher position but also appeared as a right fielder, center fielder, and first baseman. He was described in the Star Tribune in 1887 as a "fine back stop" and an "excellent thrower" with endurance that allowed him to catch up to five games a week.

Poor health led to his retirement as a player during the 1895 season. He thereafter served as manager of a semipro team in Boston.

== Death ==
On August 19, 1897, Mckeever died "after an illness of five weeks of brain fever". At the time of his death, the South Boston Bulletin called him "one of the best known ball players about Boston." He was buried at Holy Cross Cemetery in Malden, Massachusetts.
