= John Grady (baseball) =

American baseball player (1858–1924)

- First baseman
- Born: December 15, 1858; Philadelphia, Pennsylvania, U.S.
- Died: April 26, 1924 (aged 65); Philadelphia, Pennsylvania, U.S.
- Batted: Unknown Threw: Unknown

MLB debut
- May 10, 1884, for the Altoona Mountain City

Last MLB appearance
- May 24, 1884, for the Altoona Mountain City

MLB statistics
- Batting average: .306
- Home runs: 0
- Runs scored: 5
- Stats at Baseball Reference

Teams
- Altoona Mountain City (1884)

John F. Grady (December 15, 1858 – April 26, 1924) was an American professional baseball player who played one year for the 1884 Altoona Mountain Citys. Mainly an outfielder, Grady played in 9 games, getting 36 at bats. His batting average was .306.

== Sources ==
- Career statistics from Baseball Reference · Baseball Reference (Minors) · Retrosheet · Baseball Almanac
