= St. Paul Saints (Union Association) =

The St. Paul Saints, also known as the Apostles or the White Caps, were a replacement Major League Baseball team that represented St. Paul, Minnesota in the short-lived Union Association, which existed for the 1884 season only. The team began the 1884 season in the Northwestern League as the St. Paul Apostles. In September of that year, after compiling a 24–48 record, the team jumped to the Union Association along with the Milwaukee Brewers. The club finished its short stint in the Association with a 2–6–1 record in nine road games, earning the distinction of being the only major league team not to play a single home game. The team was managed by Andrew Thompson. Their normal home field was the Fort Road or Fort Street Grounds, also known as West Seventh Street Park (two names for the same street).

Their top-hitting regular was pitcher/outfielder Jim Brown, who had five hits in 16 at bats, for a batting average of .313, hit four doubles, and a slugging percentage of .563. The team also included Charlie Ganzel, their catcher, who went on to play in 786 games in a 14-season career, most notably with the Detroit Wolverines and the Boston Beaneaters.

== 1884 season ==
The 1884 St. Paul Saints (variously known also as the "White Caps" or "Apostles") joined the Union Association on September 27, 1884, partway through its season after starting the season in the Northwestern League. They finished with a 2–6–1 record. After the season the UA folded, as did the Saints.

=== Season standings ===
Union Association
| Team | W | L | Pct. | GB | Home | Road |
|---|---|---|---|---|---|---|
| St. Louis Maroons | 94 | 19 | .832 | — | 49‍–‍6 | 45‍–‍13 |
| Cincinnati Outlaw Reds | 69 | 36 | .657 | 21 | 35‍–‍17 | 34‍–‍19 |
| Baltimore Monumentals | 58 | 47 | .552 | 32 | 29‍–‍21 | 29‍–‍26 |
| Boston Reds | 58 | 51 | .532 | 34 | 34‍–‍22 | 24‍–‍29 |
| Milwaukee Brewers | 8 | 4 | .667 | 35½ | 8‍–‍4 | 0‍–‍0 |
| St. Paul Saints | 2 | 6 | .250 | 39½ | 0‍–‍0 | 2‍–‍6 |
| Chicago Browns/Pittsburgh Stogies | 41 | 50 | .451 | 42 | 21‍–‍19 | 20‍–‍31 |
| Altoona Mountain Citys | 6 | 19 | .240 | 44 | 6‍–‍12 | 0‍–‍7 |
| Wilmington Quicksteps | 2 | 16 | .111 | 44½ | 1‍–‍6 | 1‍–‍10 |
| Washington Nationals (UA) | 47 | 65 | .420 | 46½ | 36‍–‍27 | 11‍–‍38 |
| Philadelphia Keystones | 21 | 46 | .313 | 50 | 14‍–‍21 | 7‍–‍25 |
| Kansas City Cowboys | 16 | 63 | .203 | 61 | 11‍–‍23 | 5‍–‍40 |

=== Record vs. opponents ===
1884 Union Association record Sources:
| Team | ALT | BLU | BSU | CUN | COR | KC | MIL | PHK | SLM | SPS | WST | WIL |
|---|---|---|---|---|---|---|---|---|---|---|---|---|
| Altoona | — | 1–3 | 1–1 | 0–0 | 0–3 | 0–0 | 0–0 | 1–3 | 0–8 | 0–0 | 3–1 | 0–0 |
| Baltimore | 3–1 | — | 10–5–1 | 7–5 | 4–10 | 10–2 | 1–3 | 10–2 | 1–14 | 0–0 | 11–5 | 1–0 |
| Boston | 1–1 | 5–10–1 | — | 4–8–1 | 5–11 | 8–4 | 2–2 | 8–3 | 8–8 | 0–0 | 12–4 | 5–0 |
| Chicago/Pittsburgh | 0–0 | 5–7 | 8–4–1 | — | 7–8 | 12–4 | 0–0 | 3–5 | 2–14 | 0–0 | 4–8–1 | 0–0 |
| Cincinnati | 3–0 | 10–4 | 11–5 | 8–7 | — | 9–1 | 0–0 | 9–0 | 4–12 | 3–0 | 10–6 | 2–1 |
| Kansas City | 0–0 | 2–10 | 4–8 | 4–12 | 1–9 | — | 0–0 | 0–4 | 0–11–1 | 1–1–1 | 4–8–1 | 0–0 |
| Milwaukee | 0–0 | 3–1 | 2–2 | 0–0 | 0–0 | 0–0 | — | 0–0 | 0–0 | 0–0 | 3–1 | 0–0 |
| Philadelphia | 3–1 | 2–10 | 3–8 | 5–3 | 0–9 | 4–0 | 0–0 | — | 0–8 | 0–0 | 4–7 | 0–0 |
| St. Louis | 8–0 | 14–1 | 8–8 | 14–2 | 12–4 | 11–0–1 | 0–0 | 8–0 | — | 2–1 | 13–3 | 4–0 |
| St. Paul | 0–0 | 0–0 | 0–0 | 0–0 | 0–3 | 1–1–1 | 0–0 | 0–0 | 1–2 | — | 0–0 | 0–0 |
| Washington | 1–3 | 5–11 | 4–12 | 8–4–1 | 6–10 | 8–4–1 | 1–3 | 7–4 | 3–13 | 0–0 | — | 4–1 |
| Wilmington | 0–0 | 0–1 | 0–5 | 0–0 | 1–2 | 0–0 | 0–0 | 0–0 | 0–4 | 0–0 | 1–4 | — |

=== Roster ===
1884 St. Paul Saints
Roster
| Pitchers: Jim Brown; Lou Galvin; Catchers: Pat Dealy; Charlie Ganzel | Infielders: Steve Dunn; Moxie Hengel; Billy O'Brien; Joe Werrick | Outfielders: Bill Barnes; Scrappy Carroll; John Tilley | Manager: Andrew Thompson |

== Player stats ==
=== Batting ===
==== Starters by position ====
Note: Pos = Position; G = Games played; AB = At bats; H = Hits; Avg. = Batting average; HR = Home runs

| Pos | Player | G | AB | H | Avg. | HR |
|---|---|---|---|---|---|---|
| C | Charlie Ganzel | 7 | 23 | 5 | .217 | 0 |
| 1B | Steve Dunn | 9 | 32 | 8 | .250 | 0 |
| 2B | Moxie Hengel | 9 | 33 | 5 | .152 | 0 |
| 3B | Billy O'Brien | 9 | 30 | 7 | .233 | 0 |
| SS | Joe Werrick | 9 | 27 | 2 | .074 | 0 |
| OF | John Tilley | 9 | 26 | 4 | .154 | 0 |
| OF | Bill Barnes | 8 | 30 | 6 | .200 | 0 |
| OF | Scrappy Carroll | 9 | 31 | 3 | .097 | 0 |

==== Other batters ====
Note: G = Games played; AB = At bats; H = Hits; Avg. = Batting average; HR = Home runs

| Player | G | AB | H | Avg. | HR |
|---|---|---|---|---|---|
| Jim Brown | 6 | 16 | 5 | .313 | 0 |
| Pat Dealy | 5 | 15 | 2 | .133 | 0 |

=== Pitching ===
==== Starting pitchers ====
Note: G = Games pitched; IP = Innings pitched; W = Wins; L = Losses; ERA = Earned run average; SO = Strikeouts

| Player | G | IP | W | L | ERA | SO |
|---|---|---|---|---|---|---|
| Jim Brown | 6 | 36.0 | 1 | 4 | 3.75 | 20 |
| Lou Galvin | 3 | 25.0 | 0 | 2 | 2.88 | 17 |

==== Relief pitchers ====
Note: G = Games pitched; W = Wins; L = Losses; SV = Saves; ERA = Earned run average; SO = Strikeouts

| Player | G | W | L | SV | ERA | SO |
|---|---|---|---|---|---|---|
| Billy O'Brien | 2 | 1 | 0 | 0 | 1.80 | 7 |
