= Tom Ryder (baseball) =

American baseball player (1863–1935)

- Outfielder
- Born: May 9, 1863; Dubuque, Iowa
- Died: July 18, 1935 (aged 72); Dubuque, Iowa
- Batted: Left Threw: Unknown

MLB debut
- July 22, 1884, for the St. Louis Maroons

Last MLB appearance
- August 6, 1884, for the St. Louis Maroons

MLB statistics
- Batting average: .250
- Home runs: 0
- Runs scored: 4
- Stats at Baseball Reference

Teams
- St. Louis Maroons (1884)

Thomas Ryder (May 9, 1863 – July 18, 1935) was a 19th-century professional baseball outfielder. He played for the St. Louis Maroons of the Union Association in July and August 1884.
