= John Murphy (pitcher) =

American baseball player (1858–1905)

- Outfielder / Pitcher
- Born: 1858; Philadelphia, Pennsylvania, U.S.
- Died: March 7, 1905 (aged 46–47); Philadelphia, Pennsylvania, U.S.
- Batted: Unknown Threw: Unknown

MLB debut
- April 17, 1884, for the Altoona Mountain City

Last MLB appearance
- September 12, 1884, for the Wilmington Quicksteps

MLB statistics
- Win–loss record: 5-12
- Earned run average: 3.61
- Batting average: .128
- Stats at Baseball Reference

Teams
- Altoona Mountain City (1884); Wilmington Quicksteps (1884)

John Henry Murphy (1858 – March 7, 1905) was an American professional baseball pitcher. He played in Major League Baseball in 1884 with Altoona Mountain City and the Wilmington Quicksteps. He was born in Philadelphia, Pennsylvania.

== Sources ==
- Career statistics from Baseball Reference · Baseball Reference (Minors) · Retrosheet · Baseball Almanac
