= Frank Buttery =

American baseball player (1851–1902)

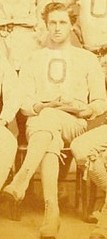
- Outfielder / Pitcher / Third baseman
- Born: May 13, 1851; Silvermine, Connecticut, U.S.
- Died: December 16, 1902 (aged 51); Norwalk, Connecticut, U.S.
- Batted: Unknown Threw: Unknown

MLB debut
- April 26, 1872, for the Middletown Mansfields

Last MLB appearance
- July 27, 1872, for the Middletown Mansfields

MLB statistics
- Batting average: .215
- Home runs: 0
- Runs batted in: 7
- Win–loss record: 3–2
- Earned run average: 4.27
- Strikeouts: 5
- Stats at Baseball Reference

Teams
- National Association of Base Ball Players: Norwalk Libertys (1869); Stratford Osceolas (1870-1871); League Player: Middletown Mansfields (1872)

Frank Buttery (May 13, 1851 – December 16, 1902) was an American professional baseball player who played during the 1872 season for the Middletown Mansfields in the National Association.

== Death ==
He died at age 51 in 1902 from blood poisoning.
