= Joe Flynn (baseball) =

American baseball player (1861–1933)

- Outfielder
- Born: December 29, 1861; Providence, Rhode Island, U.S.
- Died: December 22, 1933 (aged 71); Providence, Rhode Island, U.S.
- Batted: Unknown Threw: Unknown

MLB debut
- April 18, 1884, for the Philadelphia Keystones

Last MLB appearance
- September 17, 1884, for the Boston Reds

MLB statistics
- Batting average: .246
- Home runs: 4
- Runs batted in: 0
- Stats at Baseball Reference

Teams
- Philadelphia Keystones (1884); Boston Reds (1884)

Joseph Nicholas Flynn (December 29, 1861 – December 22, 1933) was an American Major League Baseball outfielder. He played for the 1884 Philadelphia Keystones and Boston Reds in the Union Association.

== Sources ==
- Career statistics from Baseball Reference · Retrosheet · Baseball Almanac
