= Altoona Mountain Citys =

Professional baseball team in Altoona, Pennsylvania in 1884

Information
- League: Union Association
- Location: Altoona, Pennsylvania
- Ballpark: Columbia Park
- Founded: 1884
- Folded: 1884
- Nickname(s): Altoona Pride, Altoona Ottawas
- Colors: Purple , white
- Ownership: Arthur Dively, William Ritz
- Manager: Ed Curtis

The Altoona Mountain Citys were a professional baseball franchise that played in Altoona, Pennsylvania in 1884. The Mountain Citys were a charter member of the Union Association, but folded after 25 games with a 6–19 record. They were alternately known as the Ottawas, after the local history of the Ottawa people in the 17th and 18th centuries. At the start of the season, they were also known by the nickname Altoona Pride, and were advertised as the Famous Altoonas. By the season's end, they were known as the Altoona Unfortunates.

== History ==
For its roughly six weeks of play, the Altoona Mountain Citys were managed by Ed Curtis and played in Altoona's Columbia Park. Among its roster, catcher Jerrie Moore and shortstop Germany Smith were two of its best players. John Murphy and Jim Brown were the team's ace pitchers.

When Henry Lucas, president of the newest major league, the Union Association, could only find seven teams for his league, he convinced the team, then part of the Inter-State Association, to join the league, with the promise that the Pennsylvania Railroad would provide some backing.

The Mountain Citys began the 1884 season by playing the top teams in the league, the St. Louis Maroons and the Cincinnati Outlaw Reds, and losing 11 straight. The Altoona team's performance against the Maroons was especially hideous; they gave up 92 runs and made 53 errors. After finally winning their first game on May 10, the Mountain Citys went 5–8 the rest of the way before folding. The team's final game was on May 31, 1884. The team was a disaster – attendance was as low as 200 on some games, and averaged slightly more than 1,000 per home game, low figures even for those times.

Shortly after the club folded, the Kansas City Unions (also known as the Unions or Cowboys) were formed to take over Altoona's games in the schedule; this club played out the remainder of the season. Despite a 16-63 (.203 W-L percentage) finish, the franchise was one of only two (the St. Louis club being the other) in the league to make a profit. In contemporary newspaper reports, the team had Altoona's record (6-19) combined with their own and were considered to have finished last in an eight-team league. The Unions disbanded shortly after the Union Association voted to dissolve after the 1884 season.

The Altoona Curve, Double-A affiliate of the Pittsburgh Pirates, saluted the Mountain Citys by changing their names to "The Altoona Mountain City" for every Thursday game.

== 1884 season ==
=== Season standings ===
Union Association
| Team | W | L | Pct. | GB | Home | Road |
|---|---|---|---|---|---|---|
| St. Louis Maroons | 94 | 19 | .832 | — | 49‍–‍6 | 45‍–‍13 |
| Cincinnati Outlaw Reds | 69 | 36 | .657 | 21 | 35‍–‍17 | 34‍–‍19 |
| Baltimore Monumentals | 58 | 47 | .552 | 32 | 29‍–‍21 | 29‍–‍26 |
| Boston Reds | 58 | 51 | .532 | 34 | 34‍–‍22 | 24‍–‍29 |
| Milwaukee Brewers | 8 | 4 | .667 | 35½ | 8‍–‍4 | 0‍–‍0 |
| St. Paul Saints | 2 | 6 | .250 | 39½ | 0‍–‍0 | 2‍–‍6 |
| Chicago Browns/Pittsburgh Stogies | 41 | 50 | .451 | 42 | 21‍–‍19 | 20‍–‍31 |
| Altoona Mountain Citys | 6 | 19 | .240 | 44 | 6‍–‍12 | 0‍–‍7 |
| Wilmington Quicksteps | 2 | 16 | .111 | 44½ | 1‍–‍6 | 1‍–‍10 |
| Washington Nationals (UA) | 47 | 65 | .420 | 46½ | 36‍–‍27 | 11‍–‍38 |
| Philadelphia Keystones | 21 | 46 | .313 | 50 | 14‍–‍21 | 7‍–‍25 |
| Kansas City Cowboys | 16 | 63 | .203 | 61 | 11‍–‍23 | 5‍–‍40 |

=== Record vs. opponents ===
1884 Union Association record Sources:
| Team | ALT | BAL | BOS | CHI/PIT | CIN | KC | MIL | PHI | STL | STP | WSH | WIL |
|---|---|---|---|---|---|---|---|---|---|---|---|---|
| Altoona | — | 1–3 | 1–1 | 0–0 | 0–3 | 0–0 | 0–0 | 1–3 | 0–8 | 0–0 | 3–1 | 0–0 |
| Baltimore | 3–1 | — | 10–5–1 | 7–5 | 4–10 | 10–2 | 1–3 | 10–2 | 1–14 | 0–0 | 11–5 | 1–0 |
| Boston | 1–1 | 5–10–1 | — | 4–8–1 | 5–11 | 8–4 | 2–2 | 8–3 | 8–8 | 0–0 | 12–4 | 5–0 |
| Chicago/Pittsburgh | 0–0 | 5–7 | 8–4–1 | — | 7–8 | 12–4 | 0–0 | 3–5 | 2–14 | 0–0 | 4–8–1 | 0–0 |
| Cincinnati | 3–0 | 10–4 | 11–5 | 8–7 | — | 9–1 | 0–0 | 9–0 | 4–12 | 3–0 | 10–6 | 2–1 |
| Kansas City | 0–0 | 2–10 | 4–8 | 4–12 | 1–9 | — | 0–0 | 0–4 | 0–11–1 | 1–1–1 | 4–8–1 | 0–0 |
| Milwaukee | 0–0 | 3–1 | 2–2 | 0–0 | 0–0 | 0–0 | — | 0–0 | 0–0 | 0–0 | 3–1 | 0–0 |
| Philadelphia | 3–1 | 2–10 | 3–8 | 5–3 | 0–9 | 4–0 | 0–0 | — | 0–8 | 0–0 | 4–7 | 0–0 |
| St. Louis | 8–0 | 14–1 | 8–8 | 14–2 | 12–4 | 11–0–1 | 0–0 | 8–0 | — | 2–1 | 13–3 | 4–0 |
| St. Paul | 0–0 | 0–0 | 0–0 | 0–0 | 0–3 | 1–1–1 | 0–0 | 0–0 | 1–2 | — | 0–0 | 0–0 |
| Washington | 1–3 | 5–11 | 4–12 | 8–4–1 | 6–10 | 8–4–1 | 1–3 | 7–4 | 3–13 | 0–0 | — | 4–1 |
| Wilmington | 0–0 | 0–1 | 0–5 | 0–0 | 1–2 | 0–0 | 0–0 | 0–0 | 0–4 | 0–0 | 1–4 | — |

=== Roster ===
1884 Altoona Mountain City
Roster
| Pitchers: Jim Brown; John Murphy; Catchers: Pat Carroll; Charlie Manlove; Jerry Moore | Infielders: Charlie Berry; Joe Connors; Clarence Cross; Charlie Dougherty; John Grady; Frank Harris; Harry Koons; George Noftsker; Germany Smith | Outfielders: George Daisy; Jack Leary; Taylor Shafer; Frank Shaffer | Manager: Ed Curtis |

== Player stats ==
=== Batting ===
==== Starters by position ====
Note: Pos = Position; G = Games played; AB = At bats; H = Hits; Avg. = Batting average; HR = Home runs

| Pos | Player | G | AB | H | Avg. | HR |
|---|---|---|---|---|---|---|
| C | Jerry Moore | 20 | 80 | 25 | .313 | 1 |
| 1B | Frank Harris | 24 | 95 | 25 | .263 | 0 |
| 2B | Charlie Dougherty | 23 | 85 | 22 | .259 | 0 |
| 3B | Harry Koons | 21 | 78 | 18 | .231 | 0 |
| SS | Germany Smith | 25 | 108 | 34 | .315 | 0 |
| OF | Taylor Shafer | 13 | 55 | 18 | .327 | 0 |
| OF | Jim Brown | 21 | 88 | 22 | .250 | 1 |
| OF | John Murphy | 23 | 94 | 14 | .149 | 0 |

==== Other batters ====
Note: G = Games played; AB = At bats; H = Hits; Avg. = Batting average; HR = Home runs

| Player | G | AB | H | Avg. | HR |
|---|---|---|---|---|---|
| Pat Carroll | 11 | 49 | 13 | .265 | 0 |
| John Grady | 9 | 36 | 11 | .306 | 0 |
| Jack Leary | 8 | 33 | 3 | .091 | 0 |
| Charlie Berry | 7 | 25 | 6 | .240 | 0 |
| George Noftsker | 7 | 25 | 1 | .040 | 0 |
| Frank Shaffer | 6 | 19 | 3 | .158 | 0 |
| Joe Connors | 3 | 11 | 1 | .091 | 0 |
| Clarence Cross | 2 | 7 | 4 | .571 | 0 |
| Charlie Manlove | 2 | 7 | 3 | .429 | 0 |
| George Daisy | 1 | 4 | 0 | .000 | 0 |

=== Pitching ===
==== Starting pitchers ====
Note: G = Games pitched; IP = Innings pitched; W = Wins; L = Losses; ERA = Earned run average; SO = Strikeouts

| Player | G | IP | W | L | ERA | SO |
|---|---|---|---|---|---|---|
| John Murphy | 14 | 111.2 | 5 | 6 | 3.87 | 48 |
| Jim Brown | 11 | 74.0 | 1 | 9 | 5.35 | 39 |
| Jack Leary | 3 | 24.0 | 0 | 3 | 5.25 | 7 |
| Joe Connors | 1 | 9.0 | 0 | 1 | 7.00 | 0 |

==== Relief pitchers ====
Note: G = Games pitched; W = Wins; L = Losses; SV = Saves; ERA = Earned run average; SO = Strikeouts

| Player | G | W | L | SV | ERA | SO |
|---|---|---|---|---|---|---|
| Germany Smith | 1 | 0 | 0 | 0 | 9.00 | 1 |
