= Steve Dunn (1880s first baseman) =

Canadian baseball player (1858–1933)

- First baseman
- Born: December 21, 1858; London, Ontario, Canada
- Died: May 5, 1933 (aged 74); London, Ontario, Canada
- Batted: Unknown Threw: Unknown

MLB debut
- September 27, 1884, for the St. Paul Saints

Last MLB appearance
- October 13, 1884, for the St. Paul Saints

MLB statistics
- Batting average: .250
- Home runs: 0
- Runs batted in: 0
- Stats at Baseball Reference

Teams
- St. Paul Saints (1884)

Stephen B. Dunn (December 21, 1858 – May 5, 1933) was a Canadian Major League Baseball first baseman in the 19th century. He played for the St. Paul Saints of the Union Association, a replacement team which began major league play near the end of the 1884 season.

In 9 games as the Saints' starting first baseman Dunn batted .250 (8-for-32) with two runs scored. He fielded well at first base (.972) and also played part of one game at third base.

A native of London, Ontario, Canada, he died in his hometown at the age of 74.
