= Manny Jiménez =

Dominican baseball player (1936–2017)

- Outfielder
- Born: November 19, 1936; San Pedro de Macorís, Dominican Republic
- Died: December 11, 2017 (aged 81); New York, New York, U.S.
- Batted: Left Threw: Right

MLB debut
- April 11, 1962, for the Kansas City Athletics

Last MLB appearance
- May 25, 1969, for the Chicago Cubs

MLB statistics
- Batting average: .272
- Home runs: 26
- Runs batted in: 144
- Stats at Baseball Reference

Teams
- Kansas City Athletics (1962–1964, 1966); Pittsburgh Pirates (1967–1968); Chicago Cubs (1969)

Manuel Emilio Jiménez Rivera (November 19, 1936 – December 11, 2017) was a Dominican professional baseball left fielder who played in Major League Baseball (MLB) for the Kansas City Athletics (1962–1966), Pittsburgh Pirates (1967–1968), and Chicago Cubs (1969). Born in San Pedro de Macorís, he batted left-handed, threw right-handed, and was listed as 6 feet 1 inch (1.85 m) tall and 185 pounds (84 kg).

Jiménez was regarded as an outstanding minor league hitter. In his first full professional season in 1958, he led the Northern League with a .340 batting average while playing for the Eau Claire Braves. After hitting .325 for the Pacific Coast League Vancouver Mounties in 1961, he was acquired by the Athletics from the Milwaukee Braves in a multi-player trade.

He made his major league debut on April 11, 1962, against the Minnesota Twins at Kansas City Municipal Stadium as the starting left fielder, batting fifth against Minnesota ace Camilo Pascual. The Athletics were victims of a four-hit shutout, but Jiménez went 3-for-4 against the All-Star right-hander. He was well on his way to a memorable rookie season in which he hit .301 (eighth in the American League) with 11 home runs and 69 runs batted in.

In July 1962 owner Charles O. Finley met with Jiménez and told him to "stop concentrating on hitting for average and concentrate on hitting more home runs." Jimenez went into a slump and lost about 30 points off his average during the last two months of the season. Finley at first denied any interference but later admitted to reporters that he had indeed met with Jiménez after the manager and coaches had "unsuccessfully tried to do the same thing."

Despite his initial success, playing time was harder to come by in 1963 and Jiménez found himself splitting time between Triple-A and the big leagues for the remainder of the decade.

Jiménez career totals during his 429 games included a .272 batting average (273-for-1,003), 26 HR, 144 RBI, 90 runs scored, a .337 on-base percentage, and a .401 slugging percentage. In 234 game appearances as an outfielder his fielding percentage was .966, which was below the major league average of .980 during the time he played.

His brother, Elvio, is a former major league outfielder.
