= John Upham =

Canadian baseball player (1940–2024)

- Pitcher, outfielder
- Born: December 29, 1940; Windsor, Ontario, Canada
- Died: May 22, 2024 (aged 83)
- Batted: Left Threw: Left

MLB debut
- April 16, 1967, for the Chicago Cubs

Last MLB appearance
- September 25, 1968, for the Chicago Cubs

MLB statistics
- Win–loss record: 0–1
- Strikeouts: 4
- Earned run average: 5.40
- Batting average: .308
- Stats at Baseball Reference

Teams
- Chicago Cubs (1967–1968)

John Leslie Upham (December 29, 1940 – May 22, 2024) was a Canadian relief pitcher and outfielder in Major League Baseball who played in 1967 and 1968 for the Chicago Cubs.

== Biography ==
Listed at 6 ft 0 in (1.83 m), 180 lb (82 kg), Upham batted and threw left-handed.

Upham was born in Windsor, Ontario, Canada on December 29, 1940.

In his first major league season, Upham appeared in five games as a relief pitcher, and three as a pinch hitter. He was notably more successful as a pinch hitter (2-for-3) than as a pitcher (33.75 ERA). All three of his batting appearances were as a pinch hitter in games where he did not appear as a pitcher, and he did not play a fielding position in those three games. Although Upham opened the season with the Cubs, he was sent down to the minor leagues in May and did not return to the majors that year.

Over a year later, in August 1968, Upham returned to the big leagues for 13 additional games with the Cubs. This time, Upham was primarily used as a pinch hitter and pinch runner, but was also used as an outfielder and as a pitcher where he appeared in two games as pitcher and in two games as an outfielder. For one of those outfield appearances, Upham was a late-inning defensive replacement in left; for the other, he got the start in center field on August 18 and played the entire game at that position. This made Upham the last "two-way player" in the major leagues (i.e., a player used regularly in non-blowout/non-extra-inning games as both a pitcher and a fielder in the same season) for 35 years. Brooks Kieschnick was the majors' next two-way player, for Milwaukee in 2003.

In a two-season career, Upham was a .308 hitter (4-for-13), scoring one run in 21 games. He did not register an extra-base hit, and did not drive in a run. In seven relief appearances, Upham posted an 0–1 record with a 5.40 ERA, giving up five earned runs on six hits and five walks, while striking out four in 8 1/3 innings of work.

Upham died on May 22, 2024, at the age of 83.

== See also ==
- Major League Baseball players from Canada
