= George Daisy =

American baseball player (1857–1931)

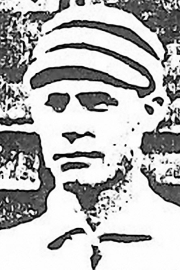
- Left fielder
- Born: March 9, 1857; Gloucester City, New Jersey, U.S.
- Died: April 17, 1931 (aged 73–74); Cumberland, Maryland, U.S.
- Batted: Unknown Threw: Unknown

MLB debut
- May 31, 1884, for the Altoona Mountain City

Last MLB appearance
- May 31, 1884, for the Altoona Mountain City

MLB statistics
- Batting average: .000
- Home runs: 0
- Runs scored: 0
- Stats at Baseball Reference

Teams
- Altoona Mountain City (1884)

George R. Daisy (March 9, 1857 – April 17, 1931) was a 19th-century American professional baseball player.

== Sources ==
- Career statistics from Baseball Reference · Baseball Reference (Minors) · Retrosheet · Baseball Almanac
