= John Rudderham =

American baseball player (1863–1942)

- Outfielder
- Born: August 30, 1863; Quincy, Massachusetts, U.S.
- Died: April 3, 1942 (aged 78); Randolph, Massachusetts, U.S.
- Batted: Right Threw: Right

MLB debut
- September 18, 1884, for the Boston Reds

Last MLB appearance
- September 18, 1884, for the Boston Reds

MLB statistics
- Batting average: .250
- At bats: 4
- hits: 1
- Stats at Baseball Reference

Teams
- Boston Reds (1884)

John Edmund Rudderham (August 30, 1863 – April 3, 1942) was an American Major League Baseball player. He played one game for the Union Association's Boston Reds in 1884, going 1-for-4 at the plate while making errors in each of his two chances in left field.

== Sources ==
- Career statistics from Baseball Reference · Baseball Reference (Minors) · Retrosheet · Baseball Almanac
