= Art Sladen =

American baseball player (1860–1914)

- Outfielder
- Born: October 28, 1860; Lowell, Massachusetts, U.S.
- Died: February 28, 1914 (aged 53); Dracut, Massachusetts, U.S.
- Batted: Unknown Threw: Unknown

MLB debut
- August 22, 1884, for the Boston Reds

Last MLB appearance
- August 25, 1884, for the Boston Reds

MLB statistics
- Batting average: .000
- Home runs: 0
- Runs batted in: 0
- Stats at Baseball Reference

Teams
- Boston Reds (1884)

Arthur W. Sladen (October 28, 1860 – February 28, 1914) was an American Major League Baseball outfielder. He played for the 1884 Boston Reds in the Union Association. He appeared in two games for the Reds, and was hitless in seven at-bats.

== Sources ==
- Career statistics from Baseball Reference · Retrosheet · Baseball Almanac
