= Walter Hackett (baseball) =

American baseball player (1857–1920)

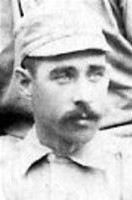
- Shortstop
- Born: August 15, 1857; Cambridge, Massachusetts, U.S.
- Died: October 2, 1920 (aged 63); Cambridge, Massachusetts, U.S.
- Batted: Unknown Threw: Unknown

MLB debut
- April 17, 1884, for the Philadelphia Keystones

Last MLB appearance
- October 8, 1885, for the Boston Beaneaters

MLB statistics
- Batting average: .230
- Home runs: 1
- Runs batted in: 9
- Stats at Baseball Reference

Teams
- Boston Reds (1884); Boston Beaneaters (1885)

Walter Henry Hackett (August 15, 1857 – October 2, 1920) was an American Major League Baseball shortstop. He played for the 1884 Boston Reds in the Union Association and the 1885 Boston Beaneaters in the National League. He later played in the minor leagues through 1889. His brother, Mert Hackett and cousins Dad Clarkson, John Clarkson and Walter Clarkson all also played professional baseball.

== Sources ==
- Career statistics from Baseball Reference · Baseball Reference (Minors) · Retrosheet · Baseball Almanac

Family History, great-grandson Walter Henry Hackett, III, Attorney at Law, CA SBN230607
