= Charlie Manlove =

American baseball player (1862–1952)

- Catcher
- Born: October 8, 1862; Philadelphia, Pennsylvania, U.S.
- Died: February 12, 1952 (aged 89); Altoona, Pennsylvania, U.S.
- Batted: Right Threw: Right

MLB debut
- May 31, 1884, for the Altoona Mountain Citys

Last MLB appearance
- June 17th, 1884, for the New York Gothams

MLB statistics
- Batting average: .176
- Hits: 3
- Runs: 1
- Stats at Baseball Reference

Teams
- Altoona Mountain City (1884); New York Gothams (1884)

Charles Henry Weeks "Chick" Manlove (October 8, 1862 – February 12, 1952) was an American professional baseball catcher. Whose career in the Major League Baseball (MLB) lasted one year. (1884)

== Major League Baseball career ==
“Chick” was an American professional baseball catcher that played a total of five games in his MLB career.

Charlie Manlove compiled a career record of wins and losses in his 5-game career with the New York Gothams and Altoona Mountain City.

He played during the 1884 season, collecting three hits in 17 at bats for a .176 career MLB batting average.

== Minor League Baseball career ==
Charlie Manlove had a minor career batting average of .151 with 0 home runs and 0 RBI in his 12-game career with the Altoona, Reading Actives and Altoona Mountaineers. He began playing during the 1883 season and last took the field during the 1892 campaign.

== Death ==
Charlie died in Altoona, Pennsylvania, at the age of 89 of cerebral thrombosis, and is interred at Oakridge Cemetery.
