= Charlie Dougherty =

American baseball player (1862–1925)

Chris Dougherty
- Second baseman
- Born: February 7, 1862; Darlington, Wisconsin, U.S.
- Died: February 18, 1925 (aged 63); Milwaukee, Wisconsin, U.S.
- Batted: Unknown Threw: Unknown

MLB debut
- April 17, 1884, for the Altoona Mountain City

Last MLB appearance
- May 31, 1884, for the Altoona Mountain City

MLB statistics
- Batting average: .259
- Home runs: 0
- Runs scored: 6
- Stats at Baseball Reference

Teams
- Altoona Mountain City (1884)

Charles William Dougherty (February 7, 1862 – February 18, 1925) was an American Major League Baseball player for Altoona Mountain City in 1884. He was their second baseman, and he hit a .259 batting average.

== Sources ==
- Career statistics from Baseball Reference · Baseball Reference (Minors) · Retrosheet · Baseball Almanac
