= Frank Shaffer =

American baseball player (1859–1939)

- Outfielder
- Born: December 6, 1859; Pittsburgh, Pennsylvania, U.S.
- Died: March 18, 1939 (aged 79); Eloise, Michigan, U.S.
- Batted: Unknown Threw: Unknown

MLB debut
- April 24, 1884, for the Altoona Mountain City

Last MLB appearance
- May 3, 1884, for the Altoona Mountain City

MLB statistics
- Batting average: .158
- Home runs: 0
- Runs batted in: 0
- Stats at Baseball Reference

Teams
- Altoona Mountain City (1884)

Francis X. Shaffer (December 6, 1859 – March 18, 1939) was an American Major League Baseball player in the 19th century.

== Career ==
Frank Shaffer was born in Pittsburgh, Pennsylvania, in 1859. His professional baseball career consists of six games played in 1884 for Altoona Mountain City of the Union Association. He appeared in four games as an outfielder, one as a third baseman, and one as a catcher, with a batting average of .158.

Shaffer was 5'11" and weighed 160 pounds. He died in Eloise, Michigan, in 1939.
