= Elvio Jiménez =

Dominican baseball player (born 1940)

- Left fielder
- Born: January 6, 1940 (age 85); San Pedro de Macorís, Dominican Republic
- Batted: Right Threw: Right

MLB debut
- October 4, 1964, for the New York Yankees

Last MLB appearance
- October 4, 1964, for the New York Yankees

MLB statistics
- Batting average: .333
- Home runs: 0
- Runs batted in: 0
- Stats at Baseball Reference

Teams
- New York Yankees (1964)

Felix Elvio Jiménez Rivera (born January 6, 1940) is a Dominican former professional baseball left fielder who appeared in one game for the New York Yankees in 1964.

== Career ==
The 5-foot-9-inch (1.75 m), 170-pound (77 kg) rookie was signed by the Yankees as an amateur free agent before the 1959 season.

Jiménez made his major league debut on October 4, 1964, and was in the starting lineup at home against the Cleveland Indians for the last game of the season. The Yankees lost the game 2–1 in 13 innings, but Jiménez went 2-for-6 with base hits against Luis Tiant and Tommy John. Jiménez, along with Clarence Dow and Tom Pratt, are the only players to have six at-bats in their only MLB game. He also recorded five putouts with no errors during the game.

Elvio's brother is former major league outfielder Manny Jiménez. In retirement he has served as a scout in the Dominican Republic for the Los Angeles Dodgers and Boston Red Sox.
