= Harry Koons =

American baseball player (1862–1932)

- Third baseman
- Born: August 18, 1862; Philadelphia, Pennsylvania, U.S.
- Died: April 5, 1932 (aged 69); Camden, New Jersey, U.S.
- Batted: Right Threw: Right

MLB debut
- April 17, 1884, for the Altoona Mountain City

Last MLB appearance
- July 5, 1884, for the Chicago Browns

MLB statistics
- At bats: 81
- Hits: 18
- Batting average: .222
- Stats at Baseball Reference

Teams
- Altoona Mountain City (1884); Chicago Browns (1884)

Harry M. Koons (August 18, 1862 – April 5, 1932) was an American third baseman in Major League Baseball. He played for the Altoona Mountain City and the Chicago Browns in 1884. Koons died in 1932 after being hit by a bus driver.
