= Stratford Osceolas =

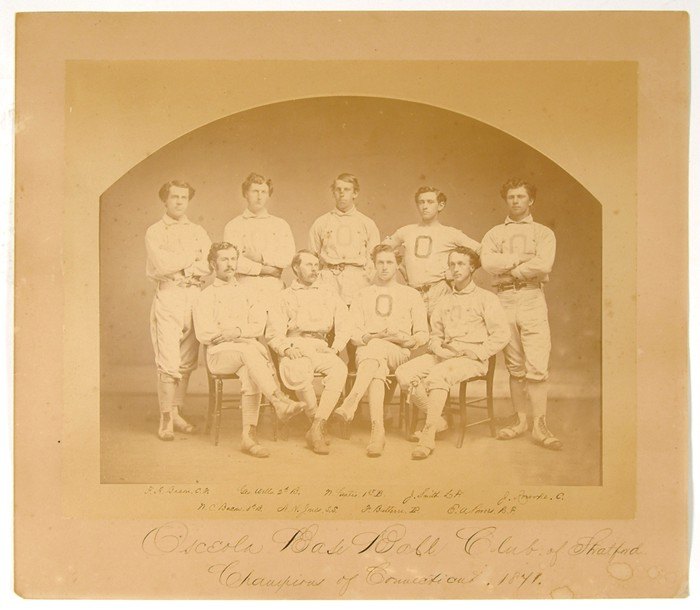
1871 Stratford Osceolas team photo

The Stratford Osceolas were an American professional baseball team located in Stratford, Connecticut. They were founded on June 18, 1866. They were the champions of the state of Connecticut in 1871.

== Notable players ==
- Jim O'Rourke
- Frank Buttery
- Tim Murnane
