= Elias Peak =

American baseball player (1859–1916)

- Second baseman
- Born: May 23, 1859; Philadelphia, Pennsylvania, U.S.
- Died: December 17, 1916 (aged 57); Philadelphia, Pennsylvania, U.S.
- Batted: Unknown Threw: Unknown

MLB debut
- April 19, 1884, for the Boston Reds

Last MLB appearance
- August 7, 1884, for the Philadelphia Keystones

MLB statistics
- Batting average: .202
- Home runs: 0
- Runs scored: 37
- Stats at Baseball Reference

Teams
- Boston Reds (1884); Philadelphia Keystones (1884)

Elias Peak (May 23, 1859 – December 17, 1916) was an American Major League Baseball second baseman. He played for the 1884 Philadelphia Keystones and Boston Reds in the Union Association. He was still playing minor league ball as late as 1897.

He died in Philadelphia on December 17, 1916.
