= Clarence Dow =

American baseball player (1854–1893)

- Outfielder
- Born: October 2, 1854; Charlestown, Massachusetts, U.S.
- Died: March 11, 1893 (aged 38); West Somerville, Massachusetts, U.S.
- Batted: Unknown Threw: Unknown

MLB debut
- September 22, 1884, for the Boston Reds

Last MLB appearance
- September 22, 1884, for the Boston Reds

MLB statistics
- Batting average: .333
- Home runs: 0
- Runs batted in: 0
- Stats at Baseball Reference

Teams
- Boston Reds (1884)

Clarence G. Dow (October 2, 1854 – March 11, 1893) was an American Major League Baseball outfielder. He played for the 1884 Boston Reds in the Union Association. Dow appeared in one game for the Reds and had two hits in six at-bats. Dow, along with Elvio Jiménez and Tom Pratt, are the only players to have six at-bats in their only MLB game.
