= Pat Scanlon (outfielder) =

Canadian baseball player (1861–1913)

- Outfielder
- Born: December 29, 1861; Halifax, Nova Scotia, British North America
- Died: July 17, 1913 (aged 52); Springfield, Massachusetts, U.S.
- Batted: Left Threw: Unknown

MLB debut
- July 4, 1884, for the Boston Reds

Last MLB appearance
- July 11, 1884, for the Boston Reds

MLB statistics
- Batting average: .292
- Home runs: 0
- Runs batted in: 0
- Stats at Baseball Reference

Teams
- Boston Reds (1884)

Patrick J. Scanlon (December 29, 1861 – July 17, 1913) was a Major League Baseball outfielder. He played for the 1884 Boston Reds in the Union Association.

== Sources ==
- Career statistics from Baseball Reference · Baseball Reference (Minors) · Retrosheet · Baseball Almanac
