= Kid Butler (outfielder) =

American baseball player (1861–1921)

- Outfielder
- Born: May 1861; Boston, Massachusetts, U.S.
- Died: April 9, 1921 (aged 59); South Boston, Massachusetts, U.S.
- Batted: Unknown Threw: Unknown

MLB debut
- May 20, 1884, for the Boston Reds

Last MLB appearance
- October 18, 1884, for the Boston Reds

MLB statistics
- Batting average: .169
- Home runs: 0
- Runs batted in: 0
- Stats at Baseball Reference

Teams
- Boston Reds (1884)

Frank Edward "Kid" Butler (May 1861 – April 9, 1921) was an American Major League Baseball outfielder. He played for the 1884 Boston Reds in the Union Association.

== Sources ==
- Career statistics from Baseball Reference · Baseball Reference (Minors) · Retrosheet · Baseball Almanac
