= Henry Mullin =

American baseball player (1862–1937)

- Outfielder
- Born: April 17, 1862; Saint John, New Brunswick, British North America
- Died: November 8, 1937 (aged 75); Beverly, Massachusetts, U.S.
- Batted: Right Threw: Unknown

MLB debut
- June 4, 1884, for the Washington Nationals

Last MLB appearance
- September 24, 1884, for the Boston Reds

MLB statistics
- Batting average: .133
- Home runs: 0
- Runs batted in: 0
- Stats at Baseball Reference

Teams
- Washington Nationals (1884); Boston Reds (1884)

Henry J. Mullin (April 17, 1862 – November 8, 1937) was a Major League Baseball outfielder. He played for the 1884 Washington Nationals in the American Association and Boston Reds in the Union Association. He played in the New England League in 1885–1886.

== Sources ==
- Career statistics from Baseball Reference · Baseball Reference (Minors) · Retrosheet · Baseball Almanac
