= Tim Murnane =

American baseball player and sportswriter (1850–1917)

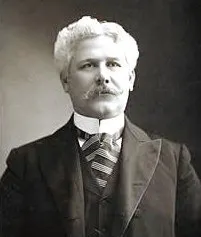
- Murnane in his older, "Silver King" years
- Born: Timothy Hayes Murnan; June 4, 1850; Lisfornane, County Tipperary, United Kingdom of Great Britain and Ireland
- Died: February 7, 1917 (aged 66); Boston, Massachusetts, U.S.
- Other names: T. H. Murnane, Silver King
- Occupation: Sportswriter
- Years active: 1887–1917
- Employer: The Boston Globe
- Known for: Baseball writing
- Spouses: Frances Manning (m. 1878; died 1895); Mary Agnes Dowling (m. 1898)
- Children: 6
- Awards: Honor Rolls of Baseball (1946); J. G. Taylor Spink Award (1978)
- Baseball career
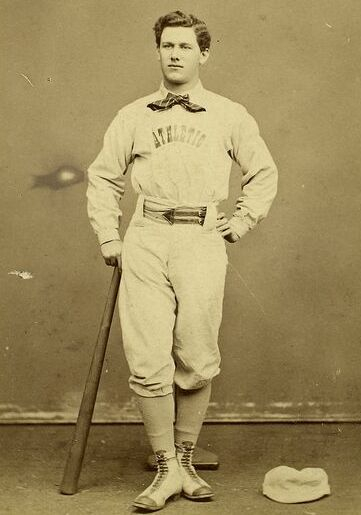
- Murnane with Athletic of Philadelphia, c. 1874
- First baseman / Outfielder
- Batted: Left Threw: Right

MLB debut
- April 26, 1872, for the Middletown Mansfields

Last MLB appearance
- October 19, 1884, for the Boston Reds

MLB statistics
- Batting average: .261
- Hits: 426
- Runs batted in: 130
- Stats at Baseball Reference

Teams
- As player: Middletown Mansfields (1872); Athletic of Philadelphia (1873–1874); Philadelphia White Stockings (1875); Boston Red Caps (1876–1877); Providence Grays (1878); Boston Reds (1884); As manager: Boston Reds (1884)

Timothy Hayes Murnane (born Timothy Hayes Murnan; June 4, 1850 – February 7, 1917) was an Irish-born American baseball player who became a leading sportswriter for that sport. He had a career as a professional baseball player for several seasons in the major leagues as a first baseman and outfielder, and spent one season as a player-manager. He later became the leading baseball writer at The Boston Globe, where he worked for three decades until his death. He also organized and led professional sports leagues and helped govern the baseball industry. Posthumously, he was inducted to the Honor Rolls of Baseball and received what is now known as the BBWAA Career Excellence Award.

== Biography ==
=== Early life ===
Murnane's birth was reported for many years as having been in 1851 in Naugatuck, Connecticut; however, research by an author for the Society for American Baseball Research (SABR) found that "he was likely born on June 4, 1850, in Ireland, and came to the United States with his immigrant parents around 1855." Baseball reference sites, notably Retrosheet and Baseball Reference, now list Murnane as having been born in 1850 in Lisfornane, County Tipperary, Ireland. (Note: At the time that Murnane was born, Ireland was part of the United Kingdom of Great Britain and Ireland.)

Little is known about Murnane's childhood. His surname was originally spelled "Murnan", which is how he was referred to in newspaper reports during his playing career; the "e" was added when he began his newspaper career.

=== Playing career ===
During Murnane's early years in baseball, he played as a catcher for the Stratford Osceolas, club in 1869; some old-timers of that era called this club was called the Savannah Seniors, though it seems Osceolas was their official name as the uniforms had a large letter "O" on the chests. Murnane remained at catcher for two seasons with the Osceolas, but moved to center field while with the Middletown Mansfields club of Middletown, Connecticut, halfway through the 1871 season. The Mansfields entered the professional National Association for 1872, which begins Murnane's major league career in records that count the National Association as a major league. He was the Mansfields' regular first basemen; that would be his most common fielding position although he played only a few full seasons as an every-day player.

Following the 1872 Mansfields, Murnane played in the majors for the Philadelphia Athletics (1873–74), Philadelphia White Stockings (1875), Boston Red Caps (1876–77), Providence Grays (1878)—as the first player signed by a new club—and finally the Boston Reds (1884), whom he also managed.

During eight seasons in the major leagues Murnane batted .261 with five home runs and 127 runs batted in. Highlights of his playing days would include finishing fifth in the National Association batting race with an average of .359 in 1872, and leading the NA with 30 stolen bases in 1875.

While Providence won the championship in its second season, the 27-year-old Murnane was no longer on the team or in the league. In 1879 and 1880, he played part-time for Capital City (in Albany, New York), Rochester, and Albany, before retiring "to open a saloon and billard hall in Boston".

Murnane returned to baseball and the major leagues for one year when the Union Association challenged the newly organized baseball industry, placing one of its eight clubs in Boston, backed by George Wright with Murnane one minor investor. Only 32, he served as recruiter, captain, and first baseman of the Boston Reds and guided them to a fifth-place finish with a record of 58–51. They did not threaten the National League in Boston, home to the NL's champion team and one of its anchor franchises. Rather, the Reds or "Unions" were a welcome but decidedly lesser attraction when the Beaneaters were out of town.

=== Later career ===
How to Play Base Ball, readable PDF

After his career in uniform, Murnane served as president of the minor league New England League for 24 years. He was also president of the Eastern League, vice president of the National Association, and went on to a 30-year career as a sportswriter and baseball editor with The Boston Globe. Articles he wrote were credited to "T. H. Murnane". He became known as the Silver King due to the color of his hair. (Note: Not to be confused with pitcher Charles Frederick Koenig, known as Silver King during his late-19th century career.)

=== Death ===
Murnane died in 1917 at age 65 of a heart attack while attending the opera at the Schubert Theatre in Boston. News reports said his death came only about 30 minutes after he had written his daily sports column for the Globe. He was originally buried in the Old Dorchester Burial Ground in Dorchester. Hundreds attended Murnane’s funeral. The pallbearers included Boston mayor James Michael Curley and Congressman James A. Gallivan; former Red Sox owner John I. Taylor was an usher. Many ballplayers attended, including Babe Ruth, then a pitcher for the Red Sox. Murnane's place of burial was later moved to the Old Calvary Cemetery in Roslindale.

Murnane had left little to care for his widow and four children from his second marriage, so the American League and the Baseball Writers' Association of America (BBWAA) established a memorial fund for his family and held a benefit game on September 27, 1917, at Fenway Park. The Red Sox, with Babe Ruth as the starting pitcher, defeated an all-star team that included Ty Cobb, Tris Speaker, and Shoeless Joe Jackson in the outfield. More than 17,000 people attended, generating at least $13,000 ($326,688 in 2025) for the Murnane family. The memorial fund purchased a gravestone for Murnane.

In 1946, Murnane was one of 39 people—executives, managers, umpires, and writers—selected for the Honor Rolls of Baseball by the National Baseball Hall of Fame. In 1978, was selected by the BBWAA as a recipient of the J. G. Taylor Spink Award for excellence in baseball journalism.

== Example works ==
- Murnane, T. H. (1903). How to Play Base Ball. New York City: American Sports Publishing Company. LCCN 05014472 – via Internet Archive.
- Murnane, T. H. (March 14, 1905). "With 18 Men. Collins Begins Practice at Macon, Ga". The Boston Globe. p. 5 – via newspapers.com.
- Murnane, T. H. (March 12, 1906). "Get First Practice". The Boston Globe. p. 9 – via newspapers.com.

== See also ==
- List of Major League Baseball player-managers

== Sources ==
- Eldred, Rich (1996). "Timothy Hayes Murnane". Baseball's First Stars. Edited by Frederick Ivor-Campbell, et al. Cleveland, Ohio: SABR. ISBN 0-910137-58-7
