= Mount Olivet Cemetery (Middletown, New Jersey) =

Cemetery in Monmouth County, New Jersey, US

- Interactive map of Mount Olivet Cemetery

Details
- Location: Middletown, New Jersey, U.S.
- Coordinates: 40.37579°N 74.08302°W
- Owned by: St. James Church, Red Bank, New Jersey (Roman Catholic Diocese of Trenton)
- No. of graves: >14,000
- Find a Grave: Mount Olivet Cemetery

Mount Olivet Cemetery is a cemetery in Middletown, New Jersey.

== Notable interments ==
- Vince Lombardi (1913–1970), National Football League coach
- Snuffy Stirnweiss (1918–1958), Major League Baseball player
