= Ed Crane (baseball) =

American baseball player (1862–1896)

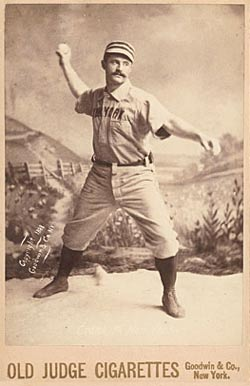
- 1887 Old Judge baseball card of Crane
- Pitcher / Outfielder
- Born: May 27, 1862; Boston, Massachusetts, U.S.
- Died: September 20, 1896 (aged 34); Rochester, New York, U.S.
- Batted: Right Threw: Right

MLB debut
- April 17, 1884, for the Boston Reds

Last MLB appearance
- July 19, 1893, for the Brooklyn Grooms

MLB statistics
- Win–loss record: 72–96
- Earned run average: 3.80
- Strikeouts: 720
- Stats at Baseball Reference

Teams
- Boston Reds (1884); Providence Grays (1885); Buffalo Bisons (1885); Washington Nationals (1886); New York Giants (1888–1889); New York Giants (PL) (1890); Cincinnati Kelly's Killers (1891); Cincinnati Reds (1891); New York Giants (1892–1893); Brooklyn Grooms (1893)

Career highlights and awards
- American Association ERA leader (1891)

Edward Nicholas Crane (May 27, 1862 – September 20, 1896), nicknamed Cannonball, was an American right-handed pitcher and outfielder in Major League Baseball for eight seasons. He played for the Boston Reds (1884), Providence Grays (1885), Buffalo Bisons (1885), Washington Nationals (1886), New York Giants (NL) (1888–89, 1892–93), New York Giants (PL) (1890), Cincinnati Kelly's Killers (1891), Cincinnati Reds (1891), and Brooklyn Grooms (1893). Crane was the first pitcher in the history of major league baseball to record 4 strikeouts in a single inning (New York Giants, 1888), and is one of the few players to play in four major leagues: the Union Association, the National League, the Players' League, and the American Association.

Born in Boston, Cannonball Crane was a man of uncommon strength. In his prime, he was described as "a giant in physical strength and proportions." He reportedly could throw a baseball 135 yards, farther than anyone else who played the game in his era. After his playing career ended, he died from what was officially declared an accidental overdose but was reported by others to have been a suicide.

== Early years (1884–87) ==
Cannonball debuted in April 1884 with the Boston Reds of the Union Association. He played in 101 games for the Reds, including 57 as an outfielder and 42 as a catcher. As a rookie, he was among the UA league leaders in most batting categories, with 12 home runs (2nd in the UA), a .451 slugging percentage (4th in the UA), 193 total bases (4th in the USA), 41 extra base hits (5th in the UA), 59 runs (7th in the UA), 122 hits (8th in the UA), and a .285 batting average (10th in the UA).

After a promising rookie year, Crane moved to the National League where he did not fare as well. In 1885, Crane played in the National League for the Providence Grays and Buffalo Bisons but appeared in only 14 games, all as an outfielder.

In 1886, he played in 80 games for the Washington Nationals, including 68 games as an outfielder and 10 games (70 innings) as a pitcher. His performance as a batter dropped off dramatically, as his batting average plummeted to .171 and he struck out 54 times. He did not fare much better as a pitcher, with a record of 1–7, an earned run average of 7.20 and an Adjusted ERA+ of 45.

With a dismal performance in 1886, Crane did not find a spot in the major leagues in 1887. Instead, Crane went to Canada and had a tremendous season for the Toronto Maple Leafs in 1887. He won the International League batting title in 1887, hitting for a .428 average (bases on balls counted as hits for the 1887 season in the Int’l League.) His .428 average in 1887 still stands as the highest batting average by a pitcher in professional baseball. He also set the all-time Maple Leafs’ record with 33 wins, as he led the Maple Leafs to their first International League pennant. On one occasion in 1887, Crane won both games of a Saturday doubleheader and also hit the game-winning home run in the second game.

== The New York Giants and Spalding's World Tour (1888–90) ==
After a great showing for the Maple Leafs, Crane signed with the New York Giants where he played in 1888 and 1889. In the 1888 season, Crane was 5–6 for the pre-modern World Series champion Giants. Crane accomplished two baseball firsts in 1888. On September 27, 1888, Crane became the first player in New York Giants’ history to throw a no-hitter. In a seven-inning game that was called due to darkness, Cannonball Crane held the Senators hitless in a 3–0 victory at the Polo Grounds. Crane retired six batters on ground balls to himself and struck out five Senators. The following week, on October 4, 1888, Crane became the first pitcher in major league history to strike out four batters in one inning.

In the 1889 season, Crane pitched in 29 games (25 as a starter) and had a much improved record of 14–10 and earned run average of 2.43 in 230 innings. Crane's career reached its pinnacle in the 1889 World Series, as Crane was the hero on the mound and at the plate. On the mound, Crane started 5 games and won 4, pitching 38 innings with a 3.79 ERA. At the plate, Crane had 5 RBIs, a .611 slugging percentage, scored 3 runs, a double, a triple, and a home run. An October 1889 newspaper account in The World described Crane's World Series performance as follows: "Ed Crane, fat and jolly, went into the pitcher's box for New York... Ed shot them in with terrific speed and brought joy to the New Yorkers, who saw the Grooms [i.e., Brooklyn Bridegrooms] succumb, one after another, to his invincible 'curves' and 'shoots'."

The newspaper's reference to Crane as "fat and jolly" was not the first such reference to Crane's girth. He won the nickname "Cannonball" due to his large size. He reportedly loved to eat and weighed 204 pounds at 5'10". (Tom Schott, Nick Peters, "The Giants Encyclopedia", p. 406.) Another book described Crane as a "prodigious eater" whose favorite snack consisted of "an order of a dozen soft-boiled eggs served in a soup bowl, which he liked to top off with an order of two dozen clams." (Lee Allen, "The Cincinnati Reds (1948)", p. 43)

After reaching the high point of his career in the 1889 World Series, Crane's life began a downhill spiral that fall. After the 1889 season, Crane traveled on the famous Spalding World Tour where he developed a taste for alcohol. The tour included 20 of the best players in baseball and covered Asia and Europe, lasting until early April 1890. One newspaper reported: "Until then, he never drank, but when the aggregation reached Paris Crane fell. . . . When he reached America again not only could he drink champagne but he had acquired a taste for less expensive drinks." The world tour was reportedly the "turning point" in Crane's life, as drinking eventually left him "without employment and incapacitated for work." A full account of Crane's time on the Spalding world tour can be found in the Mark Lamster book, "Spalding's World Tour: The Epic Adventure that Took Baseball Around the Globe—and Made It America's Game."

After returning from the Spalding tour, Crane joined the Players' League movement (a competing league formed by the players in 1890) and played with many of his former teammates for the newly formed New York Giants of the Players' League. He had a record of 16–19 and an ERA of 3.68 in 330 1/3 innings. Starting in 1890, Crane's control began to fail, as he gave up walks at a historic pace. In 1890, he gave up 210 bases on balls—the 13th highest single season total in major league history. He followed with 203 walks in 1891 and 189 in 1892—both years ranking among the highest single season totals of all time.

== Later years and death (1891–96) ==
In 1891, Crane played for Kelly's Killers and led the American Association with a 2.45 ERA (Adjusted ERA+ of 169) and 25 complete games in 250 innings. He spent the last part of the 1891 season with the Cincinnati Reds and finished the year with an 18–22 record. He followed in 1892 with a 24-loss record for the New York Giants. His major league career ended in 1893 as the 31-year-old Crane split the season between the Giants and the Brooklyn Grooms.

After being released by Brooklyn, Crane played with Toronto and then with Providence and Rochester. The 1896 season proved to be his last, and playing for Rochester, "he proved to be a failure but played the season out." According to his obituary, "his arm was in poor shape", and he was released by Rochester. He was then picked up by Springfield, where he "fared no better." He umpired a few games for Rochester but was released by the league president.

After his final release, the 34-year-old Crane spent the last few weeks of his life "going about the country" picking up odd jobs and "drinking harder and harder." On the day before his death, he was given notice that he would have to vacate his room (in a Rochester, New York hotel) the next day. He had been drinking heavily all day, and when he retired "seemed to be very gloomy." The next morning, Crane was found dead in his bed. A coroner's inquest was conducted, and the official verdict was an "accidental death from taking a chloral prescription for nervousness." Despite the coroner's verdict, others reported that Crane committed suicide by drinking acid. Crane was survived by a wife and child.

== Cannonball Crane in modern literature ==
In 1996, Canadian poet Bruce Meyer published a book "Goodbye Mr. Spalding", which includes a story titled "Sunlight Park." Sunlight Park was the name of the first ballpark in Toronto. Meyer chronicles Cannonball Crane's performance in leading the Maple Leafs to Toronto's first baseball championship in 1887 pennant and, a century later, a grieving father's drive to uncover the events surrounding Cannonball's death. Unable to confront the death of his teenage son, the father chooses, instead, to unravel the secret of Crane's final days. His desire to learn the truth transports him through time to an imagined meeting with Cannonball. Their "interview" resolves the mystery of Crane's apparent suicide and helps the father accept the death of his son.

== See also ==
- List of Major League Baseball annual ERA leaders
- List of Major League Baseball single-inning strikeout leaders
