= James Burke (baseball) =

American baseball player

- Pitcher
- Born: Attleboro, Massachusetts, U.S.
- Batted: Unknown Threw: Unknown

MLB debut
- June 10, 1882, for the Buffalo Bisons

Last MLB appearance
- September 15, 1884, for the Boston Reds

MLB statistics
- Win–loss record: 19–16
- Earned run average: 3.02
- Strikeouts: 256
- Stats at Baseball Reference

Teams
- Buffalo Bisons (1882–1883); Boston Reds (1884)

James Burke was an American professional baseball player who played pitcher in the Major Leagues from 1882 to 1884. He played for the Buffalo Bisons and Boston Reds.
