= Ed Callahan (baseball) =

American baseball player (1857–1947)

- Outfielder/Shortstop
- Born: December 11, 1857; Boston, Massachusetts, U.S.
- Died: February 5, 1947 (aged 89); New York, New York, U.S.
- Batted: Unknown Threw: Unknown

MLB debut
- July 19, 1884, for the St. Louis Maroons

Last MLB appearance
- October 13, 1884, for the Boston Reds

MLB statistics
- Batting average: .333
- Home runs: 0
- Runs scored: 0
- Stats at Baseball Reference

Teams
- St. Louis Maroons (1884); Kansas City Cowboys (1884); Boston Reds (1884)

Edward Joseph Callahan (December 11, 1857 – February 5, 1947) was an American professional baseball outfielder and shortstop. He played for three teams in the Union Association in 1884.
