= Tom Pratt (baseball) =

American baseball player (1844–1908)

- First baseman
- Born: January 26, 1844; Chelsea, Massachusetts, U.S.
- Died: September 28, 1908 (aged 64); Philadelphia, Pennsylvania, U.S.
- Batted: Unknown Threw: Right

MLB debut
- October 18, 1871, for the Philadelphia Athletics

Last MLB appearance
- October 18, 1871, for the Philadelphia Athletics

MLB statistics
- Games played: 1
- At bats: 6
- Hits: 2
- Stats at Baseball Reference

Teams
- National Association of Base Ball Players Philadelphia Athletics (1861–1863, 1866, 1870) Brooklyn Atlantics (1863–1866, 1868–1869) Quaker City of Philadelphia (1867) Tri-Mountain of Boston (1868) National Association of Professional BBP Philadelphia Athletics (1871)

Thomas Jefferson Pratt (January 26, 1844 – September 28, 1908) was an American professional baseball player who played for the Philadelphia Athletics. He played in one game for the Athletics on October 18, 1871, getting two hits in six at-bats. Pratt, along with Elvio Jiménez and Clarence Dow, are the only players to have six at-bats in their only MLB game. Prior to his brief professional career, he played with the old Brooklyn Atlantics in the 1860s. He had an extensive career as an umpire after retiring as a player.

== Sources ==
- Career statistics from Baseball Reference · Retrosheet
