= Dupee Shaw =

American baseball player (1859–1938)

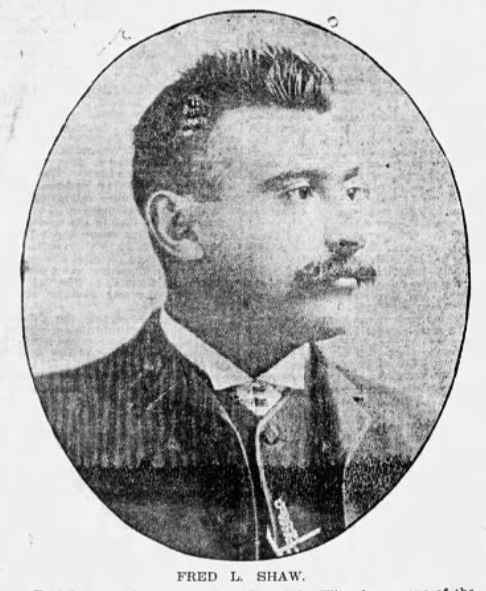
- Pitcher
- Born: May 31, 1859; Charlestown, Massachusetts, U.S.
- Died: January 12, 1938 (aged 78); Wakefield, Massachusetts, U.S.
- Batted: Left Threw: Left

MLB debut
- June 18, 1883, for the Detroit Wolverines

Last MLB appearance
- July 17, 1888, for the Washington Nationals

MLB statistics
- Win–loss record: 83–121
- Earned run average: 3.10
- Strikeouts: 950
- Stats at Baseball Reference

Teams
- Detroit Wolverines (1883–1884); Boston Reds (1884); Providence Grays (1885); Washington Nationals (1886–1888)

There have been long-fought and dangerous disputes about the exact number of motions through which Shaw puts himself before delivering the ball. One man claimed thirty-two, holding that he had counted them. An attempt to give all of them would be foolish. A few will be enough. When Shaw first lays his hands on the sphere he looks at it. Then he rolls it around a few times. Then he sticks out one leg; pulls it back and shoves the other behind him. Now he makes three or four rapid steps in the box. While he does all this he holds the ball in his left hand. After he has swapped it to his right he wipes his left on his breeches, changes the ball to the left again and pumps the air with both arms. Then he gets down to work and digs up the ground with his right foot. Then you think he is going to pitch. But he isn't. He starts in and reverses the programme and does it over again three or four times, and just as the audience sits back in the seats with a sigh, the ball flies out like a streak. Nobody knows how it left his hand, but it did.

— St. Louis Post Dispatch, June 19, 1886

Frederick Lander "Dupee" Shaw (May 31, 1859 – January 12, 1938), also sometimes known as "Wizard," was a professional baseball player from 1883 to 1896. The left-handed pitcher played Major League Baseball for six seasons with the Detroit Wolverines (1883–1884), Boston Reds (1884), Providence Grays (1885) and Washington Nationals (1886–1888). Shaw won 30 games in 1884 and 23 in 1885, but never won more than 13 games in any other season. He lost 33 games in 1884 and 31 in 1886. He had a career mark of 83–121 with a 3.10 earned run average (ERA).

Shaw claimed to have been the first pitcher to use a wind-up before throwing the ball. Some attributed his ability to strikeout batters to his unusual windmill delivery. He once struck out the great slugger, Orator Shafer, five times in a single game, and in 1884, he struck out 451 batters, a total that remains the fourth highest total in major league history. He held the major league record for the most strikeouts in a game by a losing pitcher (18), until Steve Carlton struck out 19 New York Mets in a losing effort on September 15, 1969. He also pitched a no-hitter on October 7, 1885, though the game has not qualified as an official no-hitter since 1991 because it lasted only five innings.

== Early years ==
Shaw was born in 1859 in the Charlestown section of Boston. Before playing professional baseball, he played first base for an amateur baseball team in Charlestown. His teammates on the Charlestown team included Thomas Shea, who later became a famous ragtime composer, John Clarkson, who was later inducted into the Baseball Hall of Fame and catcher Mert Hackett.

== Professional career ==
=== Wind-up ===
Shaw claimed to have been "the first pitcher to wind up preparatory to delivering the ball." Alfred Henry Spink, founder of the Sporting News, described Shaw's wind-up as follows:"

After considerable swinging and scratching around with his feet, during which he would deliver a lengthy speech to the batter, to the effect that he was the best pitcher on earth and the batter a dub, he would stretch both arms at full length over his head. Then after gazing fixedly at the first baseman for a moment, he would wheel half around and both arms would fly apart like magic... [H]e would wind his left arm around again and let the ball fly, running at the same time all the way from the box to the home plate.

Another account describes Shaw's delivery this way: "Shaw had a very peculiar preliminary motion. He was a regular jumping jack in the box, for then the pitcher had more space in the box than now and were not obliged to face the batter."

After his first game for the Providence Grays, the Sporting Life wrote: "Shaw made a successful debut and promises to be a valuable man. He has a series of introductory motions in order to get an impulse to the ball, which mystifies the batsman and conceals its pace, and will probably be a terror to left-hand hitters." Alfred Spink wrote that Shaw's swinging delivery caused "a genuine sensation," prompting baseball writers to call him "a monkey, a mountebank and other harsh names," but "Shaw paid no attention to the knocks and went right on fooling the batsmen."

Shaw replied to criticism, "Yes, I know I am nutty, but I am getting away with my games. I was bitten by a fox once." His wind-up was said to confuse batsmen and reportedly aided him in striking out the great slugger Orator Shafer five times in one game.

In addition to his complex wind-up, Shaw was also known for a further peculiarity in never stepping into the pitcher's box except from the rear. One account suggests that it was the eccentric behavior of Dupee that created the long-running baseball stereotype that left-handed pitchers were "the 'nuts' of the game."

=== Detroit ===
Shaw began his professional baseball career with the Detroit Wolverines, making his major league debut in June 1883. That year, he appeared in 26 games for Detroit, including 23 complete games, and compiled a 10–15 record with a 2.50 ERA. During a game in Boston in September 1883, Shaw's friends from Charlestown presented the rookie twirler with an elegant, inscribed gold watch, chain and charm.

Shaw remained with the Detroit club at the start of the 1884 season. He appeared in 28 games, 25 of them complete games, and compiled a 9–18 record with a 2.30 ERA. Midway through the season, Shaw jumped to the Boston Reds of the recently formed Union Association. Shaw had become the Wolverines' number one pitcher and was the first National League star to jump to the Union Association.

Shaw was interviewed 40 years later about his decision to jump leagues. Detroit fans, he recalled, held a grudge against him for leaving them mid-season for the lure of more money. When Shaw returned to Detroit in later years, he was heckled by fans with comments such as, "Oh, Shaw, how's your liver?", or "What'll you sell for?"

Shaw claimed that his real reason for jumping leagues was the bad treatment he received from Detroit's player/manager Jack Chapman. In Shaw's final game for Detroit, the Wolverines led by one run in the ninth inning, but two errors (one by Ned Hanlon in center field) allowed two runs to score. In the clubhouse after the loss, Chapman went on at length blaming Shaw without saying a word to the players whose errors contributed to the loss. Shaw recalled: "Finally I said, 'All right. I lost the ball game, but this is the last ball game I'll ever lose for Detroit.' And it was. I packed my belongings and that night I started for Boston. I applied for a job and got it."

=== Boston ===
After making the jump to the Union Association, Shaw appeared in an additional 39 games for Boston, including 35 complete games, and compiled a 21–15 record. Over the course of the full 1884 season, both with Detroit and Boston, Shaw compiled a 30–33 record and threw 60 complete games. He also struck out 451 batters, a total that remains the fourth highest single season strikeout total in major league history.

Shaw also set a major league record for the most strikeouts in a game as a losing pitcher that stood for 85 years. On July 19, 1884, he threw a one-hitter against the St. Louis Maroons and struck out 18 batters, but lost the game, 1–0. Shaw's 1884 average of 8.81 strikeouts per nine innings also broke the existing major league record.

=== Providence ===
In 1885, after the collapse of the Union Association, Shaw paid a $1,000 fine and was allowed to return to the National League as a member of the Providence Grays. On October 7, 1885, Shaw pitched a no-hitter against the Buffalo Bisons in a five-inning game. No-hitters pitched under such circumstances were counted before 1991, but no longer count as official no-hitters because nine innings were not completed. In all, Shaw pitched 49 games for Providence, including 47 complete games, and compiled a 23–26 record with a 2.57 ERA. Playing a full season against National League batters, Shaw's strikeout total dropped by more than 50% to 194. The 1885 Providence team as a whole finished the season in fourth place with a 53–57 record.

=== Washington ===
In 1886, and for the second straight year, Shaw was faced with the dilemma of having played for a team, this time Providence, that folded after the season had ended. The National League assumed control of the Providence players and assigned most of them, including Shaw, to the newly formed team in Washington, D.C. Shaw was unhappy with his assignment to Washington and insisted on being paid more than the league's maximum salary if he was to play there. A contract was eventually worked out, and Shaw appeared in 45 games for Washington during the 1886 season, going 13–31 with 43 complete games, a 3.34 ERA and 177 strikeouts. The Washington team as a whole finished in last place with a 28–92 record.

In 1887, Shaw lost his role as the Nationals' number one starter but still appeared in 21 games with 20 complete games. He compiled a 7–13 record and saw his ERA soar to 6.45. In June 1887, The Evening Star of Washington, D.C., suggested a new nickname for Shaw: "It is now 'Looney' instead of 'Dupee' Shaw. Perhaps there's method in his madness." In September 1887, the Boston Courier concluded that Shaw's career was at end, writing:

Dupee Shaw has been the enigma of the Washington team. They have laid him off, suspended and fined him. They said he was indifferent and crooked. He is a queer fellow. His day is gone by, and that is about all there is to it.

In 1888, Shaw appeared in only three games for Washington, all complete games, and compiled an 0–3 record with a 6.48 ERA. His final major league appearance was against the Indianapolis Hoosiers on July 17, 1888.

=== Comeback attempts ===
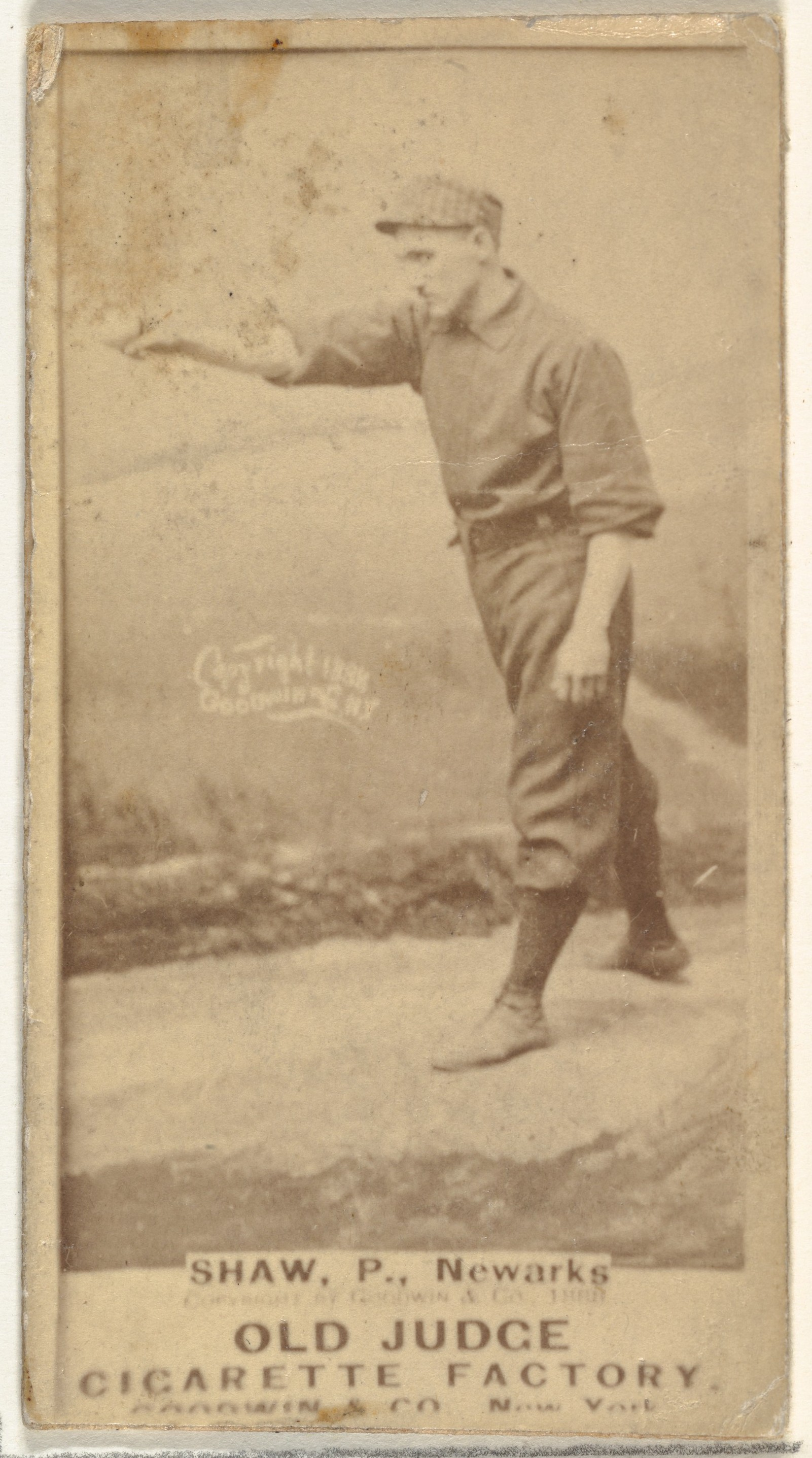
Dupee Shaw, 1889, Newark Little Giants,

Shaw was 29 when he pitched his final major league game. He made several attempts at a comeback, but arm problems appear to have prevented his return to the major leagues. In 1889, he signed with, and played for, the Newark Little Giants of the Atlantic Association. In May 1890, he received an offer to play for Brooklyn Ward's Wonders in the Players' League, but said he could not accept an offer until he was satisfied that his arm was "strong enough to stand the strain through the season." Finally, in March 1892, Shaw, at age 32, announced that he had "most of the 'crystal' out of his arm and will be in condition soon to accept advance money."

There is no indication that any major league responded to Shaw's 1892 claim of readiness. However, Shaw did return briefly to the minor leagues in 1894 with a team from Haverhill, Massachusetts, in the New England League, and then in 1896 with the Lancaster Maroons of the Class A Atlantic League. Shaw appeared in two games for Lancaster, compiling an 0–2 record with a 4.50 ERA and nine runs (only five earned) in ten innings pitched.

== Later years ==
After retiring from baseball, Dupee settled in the Boston area and was a successful businessman. At the time of the 1900 United States census, he worked as a bartender in Boston, and in 1910, he was a grocer there. He also continued to follow baseball and to participate in "old timers" games in Boston. He died at age 78 in Wakefield, Massachusetts, and was interred at Glenwood Cemetery in Everett, Massachusetts.

== See also ==
- List of Major League Baseball pitchers with 18 strikeouts in one game
- List of Major League Baseball no-hitters
