= John Irwin (baseball) =

American baseball player (1861–1934)

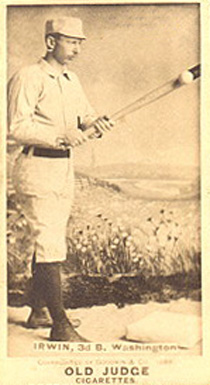
- Third baseman
- Born: July 21, 1861; Toronto, Ontario, Canada
- Died: February 28, 1934 (aged 72); Boston, Massachusetts, U.S.
- Batted: Left Threw: Right

MLB debut
- May 31, 1882, for the Worcester Ruby Legs

Last MLB appearance
- August 8, 1896, for the Louisville Colonels

MLB statistics
- Batting average: .246
- Home runs: 3
- Runs batten in: 93
- Stats at Baseball Reference

Teams
- Worcester Ruby Legs (1882); Boston Reds (UA) (1884); Philadelphia Athletics (1886); Washington Nationals (1887–1889); Buffalo Bisons (1890); Boston Reds (AA) (1891); Louisville Colonels (1891)

John Irwin (July 21, 1861 – February 28, 1934) was a Canadian born third baseman in Major League Baseball in the 19th century.

== Sources ==
- Career statistics from Baseball Reference · Baseball Reference (Minors) · Retrosheet · Baseball Almanac
