= Charlie Daniels (baseball) =

American baseball player (1861–1938)

- Pitcher
- Born: July 1, 1861; Roxbury, Massachusetts, U.S.
- Died: February 9, 1938 (aged 76); Boston, Massachusetts, U.S.
- Batted: Unknown Threw: Unknown

MLB debut
- April 18, 1884, for the Boston Reds

Last MLB appearance
- April 26, 1884, for the Boston Reds

MLB statistics
- Win–loss record: 0–2
- Earned run average: 4.32
- Strikeouts: 12
- Stats at Baseball Reference

Teams
- Boston Reds (1884)

Charles L. Daniels (July 1, 1861 – February 9, 1938) was an American Major League Baseball pitcher who briefly played in 1884 with the Boston Reds. He debuted on 18 April and strikeout a record 11 batters in a match against Philadelphia's Enoch Bakley.

Daniels played a game in the outfield in addition to his two hurling losses. After a 7–6 lose to Washington's Milo Lockwood, Daniels was dropped. He then briefly played a few innings with Lawrence of the Massachusetts State Association before leaving pro ball. He died in 1938 at Boston's Shangri-La Nursing Home for the aged.

He was born in Roxbury, Massachusetts.
