= Tommy McCarthy (baseball) =

American baseball player (1863–1922)

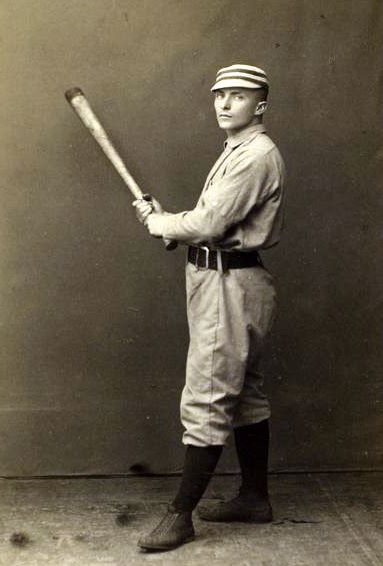
- Outfielder
- Born: July 24, 1863; Boston, Massachusetts, U.S.
- Died: August 5, 1922 (aged 59); Boston, Massachusetts, U.S.
- Batted: Right Threw: Right

MLB debut
- July 10, 1884, for the Boston Reds

Last MLB appearance
- September 26, 1896, for the Brooklyn Bridegrooms

MLB statistics
- Batting average: .292
- Home runs: 44
- Runs batted in: 732
- Stolen bases: 468
- Stats at Baseball Reference

Teams
- As player: Boston Reds (1884); Boston Beaneaters (1885); Philadelphia Quakers (1886–1887); St. Louis Browns (1888–1891); Boston Beaneaters (1892–1895); Brooklyn Bridegrooms (1896); As manager: St. Louis Browns (1890)

Member of the National

Baseball Hall of Fame
- Induction: 1946
- Election method: Old-Timers Committee

Thomas Francis Michael McCarthy (July 24, 1863 – August 5, 1922) was an American Major League Baseball player. He was elected to the Baseball Hall of Fame in 1946.

== Career ==
McCarthy was born on July 24, 1863, in Boston, Massachusetts, the eldest son of seven surviving children to Daniel and Sarah McCarthy née Healy. Daniel McCarthy was born in County Kerry, Ireland. After graduating from South Boston's John A. Andrew Grammar School, McCarthy worked for a clothing company during the day and played baseball at night. In 1884, he went to work for a piano company, where he received $18 a week for work in their factory and play for the company baseball team. Later that year, McCarthy joined the Boston Reds in the Union Association as a starting pitcher and outfielder. In limited innings and at-bats, he played poorly, batting at a paltry .215 average, and lost all seven of his pitching appearances. McCarthy moved to the National League and played with the Boston Beaneaters the following season and the Philadelphia Quakers the following two years but failed to bat higher than .200 in any season, although in limited at-bats.

Setting aside aspirations of being a star pitcher, McCarthy finally settled into an everyday position in a lineup in 1888 with the St. Louis Browns in the American Association. With the Browns until 1891, McCarthy scored over 100 runs each season and grew increasingly productive at the plate. He batted .350 in 1890 and drove in 95 runs in 1891. Although the shoddy record-keeping of the time prevents an accurate tally, he also asserted himself as a daring presence on the base-paths, by some accounts stealing over 100 bases in 1888 and approaching the mark in 1890.

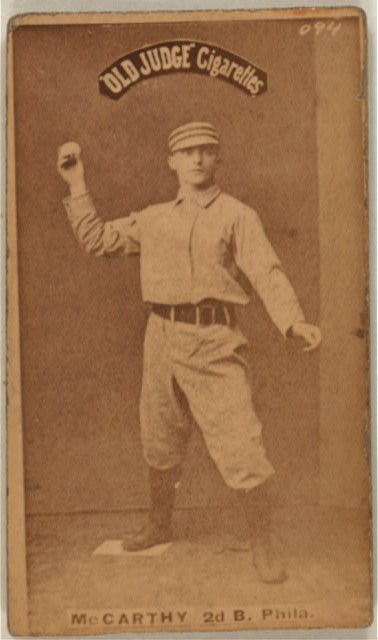

McCarthy moved back to the National League to play for the Boston Beaneaters in 1892 and enjoyed his most productive seasons over the next few years. In 1893, he drove in over 100 runs for the first time in his career, a feat that he repeated in 1894 while hitting 13 home runs. The press of the day called McCarthy and teammate Hugh Duffy the "Heavenly Twins". Their Boston team was one of the most successful clubs of the era. McCarthy played for the Brooklyn Bridegrooms in 1896 before retiring. He finished his career with a .292 batting average, 44 home runs and roughly 500 stolen bases.

== Post-playing career ==
After his playing career ended, McCarthy served as the head baseball coach at Holy Cross (1899–1900, 1904–1905, and 1916), Dartmouth (1906–1907), and Boston College (1920). He was also a scout for the Cincinnati Reds (1909–1912), Boston Braves (1913–1915) and Boston Red Sox (1920) and manager of the Newark Bears (1918). In 1921, he joined the Brooklyn Dodgers coaching staff.

In 1921, McCarthy had a severe attack of double pneumonia and was in critical condition. He recovered and traveled south for the winter. His health declined when he returned home and in June was diagnosed with cancer. He died on August 5, 1922.

== Hall of Fame selection ==
McCarthy's selection into the Baseball Hall of Fame in 1946 by the Old Timers Committee has always been a controversial one due to his less than spectacular statistics, especially when compared to those of his fellow inductees and some players who have not yet been honored.

In his 2001 book, The New Bill James Historical Baseball Abstract, Sabermetrician Bill James makes the point that McCarthy was held in such high esteem because of his introduction of the "hit and run" play into the game. This play, among other novel strategies (such as batter to baserunner signals, etc.) that he and his Boston teammates utilized, were a clever and gentlemanly counter to the rough and tumble "Baltimore" style of play which was, at the time, giving baseball a bad name. Nevertheless, in the same book, James also said that McCarthy is the worst right fielder in the Hall of Fame. As of 2014, McCarthy had the lowest Jaffe Wins Above Replacement Score of any player in the Hall of Fame.

According to SABR, McCarthy is also the only Union Association player elected to the Hall of Fame.

== See also ==
- List of Major League Baseball career runs scored leaders
- List of Major League Baseball career stolen bases leaders
- List of Major League Baseball player-managers
- List of St. Louis Cardinals team records
