= Boston Reds (Union Association) =

Poster for an April 1884 game between the Boston Unions (Reds) and the Keystone Club. Note the red uniform pants.

The Boston Reds (called the Boston Unions in some sources) of 1884 were a professional baseball team that competed in the short-lived Union Association.

== History ==
One of the last teams to join the Union Association, which operated only for the 1884 season, the Boston Reds were owned by George Wright, whose long association with professional baseball (including the first major-league team in Boston, the Red Stockings) lent credibility to the fledgling league.

The team was managed by Tim Murnane, who was also their regular first baseman. In their one season of existence, the Reds finished with a record of 58–51 (.532), in fourth place in the league.

Their top-hitting regular was outfielder Ed Crane, who batted .285 with 12 home runs, and their best pitcher was Dupee Shaw, who was 21–15 with an ERA of 1.77. Shaw struck out 18 St. Louis Maroons in a game on July 19.

== Ballpark ==
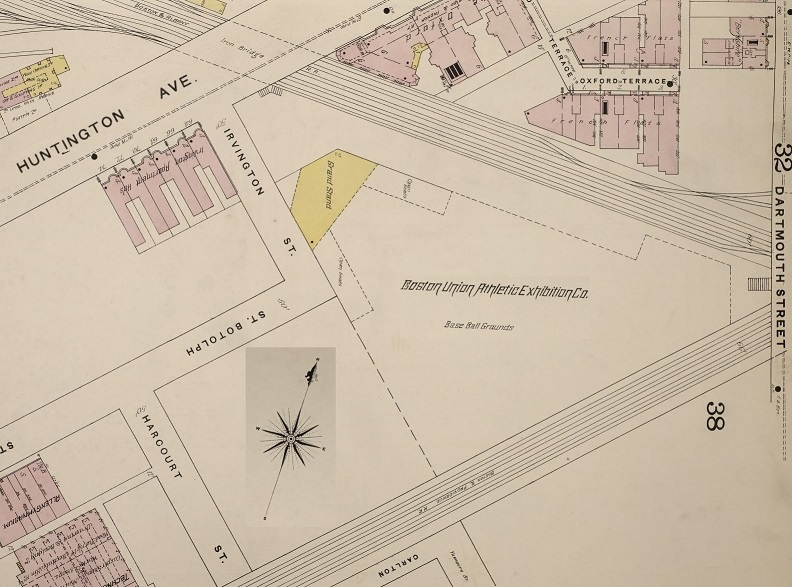
The ballpark as of 1887

The club played their home games at the Dartmouth Street Grounds, also known as the Union Athletic Grounds or Union Grounds. A diagram in The Boston Globe on April 3, 1884, around the start of construction, indicated the layout as follows: Huntington Avenue (to the north, some distance back from the main stands and home plate); Boston and Albany Railroad tracks (northeast—home plate and third base); Dartmouth Street (southeast—left and center fields); Boston and Providence Railroad tracks (south—center and right fields); Irvington Street (west, right field and third base—approximately corresponds to Yarmouth Street). Those details match the Sanborn map. The field was to be encircled by a bicycle track, as a number of ballparks were in those days, owing to the growing popularity of cycling. The property once used by the Boston Unions is now occupied by Copley Place. The field had a capacity of 4,575.
