= Union Association =

Defunct American baseball league

- Sport: Baseball
- Founded: 1884
- Ceased: 1884
- President: Henry Lucas
- No. of teams: 12
- Country: United States
- Last champion(s): St. Louis Maroons (1884)

The Union Association was an American professional baseball league which competed with Major League Baseball, lasting for just the 1884 season. St. Louis won the pennant and joined the National League the following season.

Seven of the twelve teams who were in the Association at some point during the season did not play a full schedule: four teams folded during the season and were replaced, while Chicago moved to Pittsburgh in late August.

== History ==
The league was founded in September 1883 by the young St. Louis millionaire Henry Lucas, who was eventually named the league's president, with owner Tom Pratt of the Philadelphia franchise serving as vice-president and Warren W. White of the Washington franchise as secretary.

After being appointed president, Lucas bought the best available players for his St. Louis franchise at the expense of the rest of the league, which represented an obvious conflict-of-interest situation: the Maroons subsequently opened the season with 20 straight wins, and finished with a record of 94–19 (.832 winning percentage), winning the pennant by 21 games after having clinched it with five weeks to play.

The league not only suffered from lopsided talent distribution, but also instability - four franchises folded during the season, forcing the league to scramble to replace them with three teams from lower leagues and one new team, while Chicago moved to Pittsburgh mid-season - and a poorly drafted schedule, which saw the league derisively dubbed "The Onion League" by its detractors in the two established leagues. The list of franchise movements is as follows:

- April 17: Season opens with the following franchises: Altoona Mountain Citys, Baltimore Monumentals, Boston Reds, Chicago Browns, Cincinnati Outlaw Reds, Philadelphia Keystones, St. Louis Maroons, and Washington Nationals
- May 31: Altoona Mountain Citys folded.
- June 7: Kansas City Cowboys were formed to take over Altoona's games starting on this date.
- August 7: Philadelphia Keystones folded.
- August 18: Wilmington Quicksteps recruited from Eastern League to take over Philadelphia's games, starting on this date.
- August 21: Chicago Browns played their last game before the franchise moved to Pittsburgh.
- September 15: Wilmington Quicksteps fold, having played their final game on September 12: at this point of the season, the St. Louis Maroons have already clinched the pennant, even though there are still five weeks of games left to play.
- September 18: Pittsburgh Stogies (formerly the Chicago Browns) folded.
- September 27: St. Paul Saints and Milwaukee Brewers were recruited from the Northwestern League to finish the Chicago/Pittsburgh and the Philadelphia/Wilmington schedules respectively.
- October 19: Season concludes.

On January 15, 1885, at a scheduled UA meeting in Milwaukee, only the Milwaukee and Kansas City franchises showed up, and the league was promptly disbanded.

The St. Louis franchise itself was deemed to be strong enough to enter the National League in 1885, but it faced heavy competition within the city, as the St. Louis Browns were a power in the American Association.

The lone survivor of the Union moved to Indianapolis and became the Hoosiers after 1886, having compiled records of 36–72 and 43–79 in St. Louis, and they played another three seasons before folding, with records of 37–89, 50–85 and 59–75 for a .360 win percentage in the NL, and an all-time franchise winning percentage of .432. These figures, perhaps, reveal the gulf in class between the UA and the established major leagues.

Perhaps the most obvious impact of the short-lived league was on the career of a player who did not jump to the new league: Charles Radbourn. With a schedule of a little over 100 games, most teams employed two regular pitchers, and the Providence Grays in the National League featured Radbourn and Charlie Sweeney. According to the 1991 book Glory Fades Away by Jerry Lansche, Sweeney fell out of grace with the Providence team in late July after he refused to be replaced in a game while drunk, and was expelled. Rather than come crawling back, Sweeney signed with Lucas' team, leaving Radbourn by himself.

Leveraging his situation, Radbourn pledged to stay with the club and be the sole primary pitcher if he would be given a raise and granted free agency at season's end. Radbourn, who already had 24 wins at that point to Sweeney's 17, pitched nearly every game after that, and went on to win an astounding 59 games (a record) during the regular season; he has since been credited with another win for 60 that season. For an encore, he also won all three games of 1884's version of the World Series, pitching every inning of a sweep of the New York Metropolitans of the American Association. His performance in 1884, along with a generally strong career and an overall record of 309-194 (.614), assured Radbourn his place in the Baseball Hall of Fame.

== Notable players ==
The best hitter of the 1884 Union Association was Fred Dunlap of the Maroons, while star pitchers for the UA included Jim McCormick, Charlie Sweeney, Dupee Shaw and Hugh Daily.

Notable players that made their debut in the Union Association included Tommy McCarthy, who was elected to the Hall of Fame in 1946, and Jack Clements, the only man in baseball history to play a full career as a left-handed catcher. Switch-pitcher Tony Mullane attempted to sign with the Maroons, but the Browns had a reserve clause on Mullane, and he relented after he was threatened with banishment from the NL if he signed.

== Highlights ==
The Union Association saw two no-hitters in its brief existence: one by Dick Burns of the Outlaw Reds on August 26 and one by Ed Cushman of the Brewers on September 28. On July 7, Hugh Daily struck out 19 Boston Reds in a nine-inning game, a major league record that would stand for 102 years, until Roger Clemens struck out 20 batters in a game in 1986. Henry Porter and Dupee Shaw got 18-strikeout games. The Chicago Browns executed a triple play on June 19.

== Standings ==
Locations of teams for the 1884 Union Association season
Union Association
*Chicago Browns moved to Pittsburgh mid-way through the season as the Pittsburgh Stogies.

As teams dissolved and were replaced by others, taking over their games on the schedule, Union Association standings were printed in contemporary newspapers with a total of eight teams.

Under this system, Altoona and Kansas City were counted as one team, as were Chicago/Pittsburgh/St. Paul and Philadelphia/Wilmington/Milwaukee. In fact, the Chicago team had moved to Pittsburgh mid-way through the season, maintaining the same team ownership and player roster; the league's other team changes involved entirely new teams taking over the scheduled games for a team that folded.

The final standings for the Union Association's 1884 season, when regarded as an eight-team league, were:

Union Association eight-team standings
Team	W	L	Pct.	GB	Home	Road
St. Louis Maroons	94	19	.832	—	49–6	45–13
Cincinnati Outlaw Reds	69	36	.657	21	35–17	34–19
Baltimore Monumentals	58	47	.552	32	29–21	29–26
Boston Reds	58	51	.532	34	34–22	24–29
Chicago Browns/Pittsburgh Stogies / St. Paul Saints	43	56	.434	43	21–19	22–37
Washington Nationals (UA)	47	65	.420	46½	36–27	11–38
Philadelphia Keystones / Wilmington Quicksteps / Milwaukee Brewers	31	66	.320	55	23–31	8–35
Altoona Mountain Citys / Kansas City Cowboys	22	82	.212	67½	17–35	5–47

When each individual team is considered separately (a situation that was not in force in 1884), the Union Association standings look like this:

Union Association
Team	W	L	Pct.	GB	Home	Road
St. Louis Maroons	94	19	.832	—	49‍–‍6	45‍–‍13
Cincinnati Outlaw Reds	69	36	.657	21	35‍–‍17	34‍–‍19
Baltimore Monumentals	58	47	.552	32	29‍–‍21	29‍–‍26
Boston Reds	58	51	.532	34	34‍–‍22	24‍–‍29
Milwaukee Brewers	8	4	.667	35½	8‍–‍4	0‍–‍0
St. Paul Saints	2	6	.250	39½	0‍–‍0	2‍–‍6
Chicago Browns/Pittsburgh Stogies	41	50	.451	42	21‍–‍19	20‍–‍31
Altoona Mountain Citys	6	19	.240	44	6‍–‍12	0‍–‍7
Wilmington Quicksteps	2	16	.111	44½	1‍–‍6	1‍–‍10
Washington Nationals (UA)	47	65	.420	46½	36‍–‍27	11‍–‍38
Philadelphia Keystones	21	46	.313	50	14‍–‍21	7‍–‍25
Kansas City Cowboys	16	63	.203	61	11‍–‍23	5‍–‍40

== Status as a major league ==
Although the league is currently conventionally listed as a major league, this status has been questioned by a number of modern baseball historians, most notably Bill James in The New Bill James Historical Baseball Abstract, who found that the contemporary baseball guides did not consider the Union Association to be a major league: the earliest record James found of the Union Association being referred to as a major league was Ernest Lanigan's The Baseball Cyclopedia, published in 1922.

While the league had a number of major league players (on the St. Louis franchise, at least), the league's overall talent and organization was notably inferior to that of the two established major leagues. Of the 272 players in the Association, 107 (39.34%) never played in another major league, while 72 (26.47%) played very briefly (less than 300 at bats and/or 50 hits) in other major leagues, and 79 (29.04%) had longer careers but little success in other major leagues.

The league's only star player, Fred Dunlap, led the league in batting average with .412 (86 points higher than his second-best season, and 120 points higher than his career average), and also led the league in on-base percentage, slugging percentage, runs scored, hits, total bases, and home runs (with 13, typical for the era).

After the Association folded, Dunlap never hit higher than .274 or more than seven home runs in a season until he retired in 1891, another measure of the inferior quality of the Union Association. In point of fact, if the 1884 UA season is excluded from his career totals, Dunlap's career batting average was .276 (a drop of sixteen points), and he hit 28 career home runs (a loss of nearly one-third of his career total).

However, Richard Hershberger, responding to James in the Baseball Research Journal, has argued that the UA should be considered a major league because the then-existing major leagues, the National League (NL) and the American Association (AA), treated it as a significant competitor: "The AA added teams to block the UA. The established leagues changed their own rules via the Day resolutions [to enforce the reserve clause to ban players who played in the UA]. They were forced to pay higher salaries. The AA Washingtons were run out of town by the UA. The NL Clevelands were brought to the brink and forced to sell out. Finally, the NL paid Lucas off by bringing him into the league, risking renewed war with the AA. In short, we should regard the Union Association as a major league because the National League and American Association regarded it as a major threat. They were in a position to know."
