= 1884 Major League Baseball season =

1884 MLB season
- League: American Association (AA); National League (NL); Union Association (UA)
- Sport: Baseball
- Duration: Regular season: May 1 – October 15, 1884 (AA, NL); April 17 – October 19, 1884 (UA); World's Championship Series (AA vs. NL): October 23–25, 1884
- Games: 110 (AA); 112 (NL, UA)
- Teams: 33 (28 active at any time): 13 in AA (12 active at any time); 8 in NL; 12 in UA (8 active at any time)

Pennant winner
- AA champions: New York Metropolitans
- AA runners-up: Columbus Buckeyes
- NL champions: Providence Grays
- NL runners-up: Boston Beaneaters
- UA champions: St. Louis Maroons
- UA runners-up: Cincinnati Outlaw Reds

World's Championship Series
- Venue: Messer Street Grounds, Providence, Rhode Island; Polo Grounds, New York, New York
- Champions: Providence Grays
- Runners-up: New York Metropolitans

MLB seasons
- ← 1883 1885 →

Locations of teams for the 1884 American Association season
American Association
Locations of teams for the 1884 National League season
National League
Locations of teams for the 1884 Union Association season
Union Association
*Chicago Browns moved to Pittsburgh mid-way through the season as the Pittsburgh Stogies.

The 1884 major league baseball season began on April 17, 1884. The National League and American Association's regular seasons ended on October 15, with the Providence Grays and New York Metropolitans as the NL and AA pennant winners, respectively. The newly founded Union Association regular season ended on October 19, with the St. Louis Maroons as the UA pennant winner. The postseason between the AA and NL began with Game 1 of the first World's Championship Series (the first inter-league championship game of its kind in the Major Leagues) on October 23 and ended with Game 3 on October 25, in what was a best-of-five-playoff. The Grays swept the Metropolitans in three games, capturing their first World's Championship Series.

Prior to the 1884 season, in September 1883, the Union Association was formed, in direct contravention to the reserve rule (that a ballplayer could be reserved by a team) of the 1883 National Agreement (a.k.a. Tripartite Agreement) signed between the National League, American Association, and minor league Northwestern League. In response to formation of the UA, the AA expanded their league from an eight teams to twelve teams to undermine the weak footing the UA had, as UA teams were mostly in cities that already had established AA and NL teams.

The American Association expansion saw the minor league Brooklyn Grays of the Inter-State Association of Professional Baseball Clubs join as the Brooklyn Atlantics (today's Los Angeles Dodgers) and the Toledo Blue Stockings join from the minor league Northwestern League, as well as the establishment of the Indianapolis Hoosiers and Washington Nationals. The latter played their last game on August 2, and were replaced by the minor league Eastern League's Richmond Virginians to finish Washington's schedule.

The Union Association was largely unstable throughout its only year in existence (though confidence in the league remained high), as three of its founding teams would not make it to the end of the season. The Altoona Mountain Citys folded on May 31, and were replaced by the Kansas City Cowboys on June 7. The Philadelphia Keystones folded on August 7, and were replaced by the Eastern League's Wilmington Quicksteps. The Chicago Browns relocated to Pittsburgh as the Pittsburgh Stogies following their August 21 game. The Quicksteps would fold on September 15, while the Stogies would fold just three days later. On September 27, the Milwaukee Brewers and St. Paul Apostles (now renamed the St. Paul Saints) were recruited from the Northwestern League to finish the Philadelphia / Wilmington and Chicago/Pittsburgh schedules, respectively.

== The last pre-color barrier season ==
The 1884 season featured Moses Fleetwood Walker, the second African American player in the major leagues (following William Edward White five years prior), debuting May 1 and playing 42 games for the Toledo Blue Stockings of the American Association. During his tenure, he faced abuse from other players (including teammates), fans, and the press, and even threats of being mobbed by 75 men before a road trip to Richmond, Virginia, before being released due to injury on September 29, prior to the road trip. His brother Weldy Walker played on the Toledo Blue Stockings for five games between July and August, becoming the third African American in the major leagues.

While it wouldn't be until 1887 that the color barrier was formally implemented (thanks to threats to not play from Chicago White Stockings manager Cap Anson and the general racism in society), the color barrier would not begin breaking until the Brooklyn Dodgers called up Jackie Robinson in 1947, 63 years after Walker's last game.

== Schedule ==
The 1884 schedule consisted of 110 games for all teams in the American Association, which had twelve active teams, and 112 games for all teams in the National League and Union Association, each of which had eight active teams. Each AA team was scheduled to play 10 games against the other eleven teams in their league, and each of NL & UA teams were scheduled to play 16 games against the other seven teams of their respective league. The National League increased its total games per team from 98 to 112, 14 games to 16 games per seven opponents. The new Union Association copied this format. Meanwhile, the American Association, expanding from eight to twelve teams, changed from the 98-game format to the 110-game format. The National League would continue to use their 112-game format through the following season, while the American Association would copy the NL format.

Union Association Opening Day took place on April 17 featuring six teams, while American Association and National League Opening Days took place on May 1, featuring all twelve and all eight teams, respectively. The Union Association would see its final day of the regular season on October 19 featuring four teams, while the American Association and National League would see their final day of the regular season on October 15 featuring all twelve teams and four teams, respectively. The 1884 World's Championship Series took place between October 23 and October 25.

== Rule changes ==
The 1884 season saw the following rule changes:

- In the National League all restrictions on the delivery of a pitcher were removed. This lifting of restrictions enabled pitchers to throw above the shoulder during pitch delivery. The American Association would follow suit the following year.
- In the National League, six balls became a base on balls, down from seven. The American Association keeps the rule at seven balls.
- In the American Association, a hit by pitch rule was implemented, when a batter was "solidly and bodily hit by a pitched ball when he cannot apparently avoid it." The National League would not implement a hit by pitch rule until 1887.

== Teams ==
An asterisk (*) denotes the ballpark a team played the minority of their home games at
A dagger (†) denotes a team that folded mid-season
A double dagger (‡) denotes a team joined mid-season

League	Team	City	Ballpark	Capacity	Manager
American Association	Baltimore Orioles	Oxford, Maryland	Oriole Park	5,000	Billy Barnie
American Association	Brooklyn Atlantics	Brooklyn, New York	Washington Park	3,000	George Taylor
American Association	Cincinnati Red Stockings	Cincinnati, Ohio	American Park	3,000	Will White
American Association	Cincinnati Red Stockings	Cincinnati, Ohio	American Park	3,000	Pop Snyder
American Association	Columbus Buckeyes	Columbus, Ohio	Recreation Park (Columbus)	Unknown	Gus Schmelz
American Association	Indianapolis Hoosiers	Indianapolis, Indiana	Seventh Street Park	Unknown	Jim Gifford
American Association	Indianapolis Hoosiers	Indianapolis, Indiana	Seventh Street Park	Unknown	Bill Watkins
American Association	Louisville Eclipse	Louisville, Kentucky	Eclipse Park	5,860	Mike Walsh
American Association	New York Metropolitans	New York, New York	Metropolitan Park	5,000	Jim Mutrie
American Association	New York Metropolitans	New York, New York	Polo Grounds*	20,709*	Jim Mutrie
American Association	Philadelphia Athletics	Philadelphia, Pennsylvania	Jefferson Street Grounds	15,000	Lon Knight
American Association	Pittsburgh Alleghenys	Allegheny, Pennsylvania	Recreation Park (Pittsburgh)	17,000	Denny McKnight
American Association	Pittsburgh Alleghenys	Allegheny, Pennsylvania	Recreation Park (Pittsburgh)	17,000	Bob Ferguson
American Association	Pittsburgh Alleghenys	Allegheny, Pennsylvania	Recreation Park (Pittsburgh)	17,000	Joe Battin
American Association	Pittsburgh Alleghenys	Allegheny, Pennsylvania	Recreation Park (Pittsburgh)	17,000	George Creamer
American Association	Pittsburgh Alleghenys	Allegheny, Pennsylvania	Recreation Park (Pittsburgh)	17,000	Horace Phillips
American Association	Richmond Virginians‡	Richmond, Virginia	Virginia Base-Ball Park	Unknown	Felix Moses
American Association	St. Louis Browns	St. Louis, Missouri	Sportsman's Park	6,000	Jimmy Williams
American Association	St. Louis Browns	St. Louis, Missouri	Sportsman's Park	6,000	Charles Comiskey
American Association	Toledo Blue Stockings	Toledo, Ohio	League Park	Unknown	Charlie Morton
American Association	Washington Nationals (AA)†	Washington, D.C.	Athletic Park (Washington)	6,000	Holly Hollingshead
American Association	Washington Nationals (AA)†	Washington, D.C.	Athletic Park (Washington)	6,000	John Bickerton
National League	Boston Beaneaters	Boston, Massachusetts	South End Grounds	3,000	John Morrill
National League	Buffalo Bisons	Buffalo, New York	Olympic Park	5,000	Jim O'Rourke
National League	Chicago White Stockings	Chicago, Illinois	Lakefront Park	5,000	Cap Anson
National League	Cleveland Blues	Cleveland, Ohio	National League Park	Unknown	Charlie Hackett
National League	Detroit Wolverines	Detroit, Michigan	Recreation Park (Detroit)	Unknown	Jack Chapman
National League	New York Gothams	New York, New York	Polo Grounds	20,709	John Montgomery Ward
National League	New York Gothams	New York, New York	Polo Grounds	20,709	Jim Price
National League	Philadelphia Quakers	Philadelphia, Pennsylvania	Recreation Park	6,500	Harry Wright
National League	Providence Grays	Providence, Rhode Island	Messer Street Grounds	6,000	Frank Bancroft
Union Association	Altoona Mountain Citys†	Altoona, Pennsylvania	Columbia Park	Unknown	Ed Curtis
Union Association	Baltimore Monumentals	Baltimore, Maryland	Belair Lot	Unknown	Bill Henderson
Union Association	Boston Reds	Boston, Massachusetts	Dartmouth Street Grounds	4,575	Tim Murnane
Union Association	Chicago Browns/Pittsburgh Stogies†	Chicago, Illinois	South Side Park	Unknown	Ed Hengel
Union Association	Chicago Browns/Pittsburgh Stogies†	Allegheny, Pennsylvania	Exposition Park	Unknown	Joe Battin
Union Association	Chicago Browns/Pittsburgh Stogies†	Allegheny, Pennsylvania	Exposition Park	Unknown	Joe Ellick
Union Association	Cincinnati Outlaw Reds	Cincinnati, Ohio	Bank Street Grounds	3,000	Dan O'Leary
Union Association	Cincinnati Outlaw Reds	Cincinnati, Ohio	Bank Street Grounds	3,000	Sam Crane
Union Association	Kansas City Cowboys	Kansas City, Missouri	Athletic Park	4,000	Harry Wheeler
Union Association	Kansas City Cowboys	Kansas City, Missouri	Athletic Park	4,000	Matthew Porter
Union Association	Kansas City Cowboys	Kansas City, Missouri	Athletic Park	4,000	Ted Sullivan
Union Association	Milwaukee Brewers‡	Milwaukee, Wisconsin	Wright Street Grounds	5,300	Tom Loftus
Union Association	Philadelphia Keystones†	Philadelphia, Pennsylvania	Keystone Park	Unknown	Fergy Malone
Union Association	St. Louis Maroons	St. Louis, Missouri	Union Base Ball Park	10,000	Ted Sullivan
Union Association	St. Louis Maroons	St. Louis, Missouri	Union Base Ball Park	10,000	Fred Dunlap
Union Association	St. Paul Saints‡	Saint Paul, Minnesota	West Seventh Street Park	Unknown	Andrew Thompson
Union Association	Washington Nationals (UA)	Washington, D.C.	Capitol Grounds	6,000	Michael Scanlon
Union Association	Wilmington Quicksteps‡†	Wilmington, Delaware	Union Street Park	Unknown	Joe Simmons

=== Neutral site and Sunday games ===
Four teams played in four neutral or alternate sites in which they were treated as the home team. Meanwhile, blue laws restricted Sunday activities in several localities, causing the Indianapolis Hoosiers of the American Association (which was informally referred to as the "Beer & Whiskey League" due to its openness on alcohol, compared to the National League) to play at ballparks in a different locality.

Team	City	Ballpark	Capacity	Games played	Type
Baltimore Monumentals	Baltimore, Maryland	Monumental Park	Unknown	1	Neutral site
Cincinnati Red Stockings	Brooklyn, New York	Washington Park	3,000	1	Neutral site
Indianapolis Hoosiers	Center Township, Indiana	Bruce Grounds	Unknown	11	Sunday
Pittsburgh Stogies	Baltimore, Maryland	Belair Lot	Unknown	1	Neutral site
Toledo Blue Stockings	Toledo, Ohio	Tri-State Fair Grounds	Unknown	1	Neutral site

1. In today's Baltimore, Maryland.
2. In today's New York, New York.
3. In today's Pittsburgh, Pennsylvania.
4. In today's Indianapolis, Indiana.

== Standings ==
=== American Association ===
American Association
Team	W	L	Pct.	GB	Home	Road
New York Metropolitans	75	32	.701	—	42‍–‍9	33‍–‍23
Columbus Buckeyes	69	39	.639	6½	38‍–‍16	31‍–‍23
Louisville Eclipse	68	40	.630	7½	41‍–‍14	27‍–‍26
St. Louis Browns	67	40	.626	8	38‍–‍16	29‍–‍24
Cincinnati Red Stockings	68	41	.624	8	40‍–‍16	28‍–‍25
Baltimore Orioles	63	43	.594	11½	42‍–‍13	21‍–‍30
Philadelphia Athletics	61	46	.570	14	38‍–‍16	23‍–‍30
Toledo Blue Stockings	46	58	.442	27½	28‍–‍25	18‍–‍33
Brooklyn Atlantics	40	64	.385	33½	23‍–‍26	17‍–‍38
Richmond Virginians	12	30	.286	30½	5‍–‍15	7‍–‍15
Pittsburgh Alleghenys	30	78	.278	45½	18‍–‍37	12‍–‍41
Indianapolis Hoosiers	29	78	.271	46	15‍–‍39	14‍–‍39
Washington Nationals	12	51	.190	41	10‍–‍20	2‍–‍31

=== National League ===
National League
Team	W	L	Pct.	GB	Home	Road
Providence Grays	84	28	.750	—	45‍–‍11	39‍–‍17
Boston Beaneaters	73	38	.658	10½	40‍–‍16	33‍–‍22
Buffalo Bisons	64	47	.577	19½	37‍–‍18	27‍–‍29
New York Gothams	62	50	.554	22	34‍–‍22	28‍–‍28
Chicago White Stockings	62	50	.554	22	39‍–‍17	23‍–‍33
Philadelphia Quakers	39	73	.348	45	19‍–‍37	20‍–‍36
Cleveland Blues	35	77	.312	49	22‍–‍34	13‍–‍43
Detroit Wolverines	28	84	.250	56	18‍–‍38	10‍–‍46

=== Union Association ===
Union Association
Team	W	L	Pct.	GB	Home	Road
St. Louis Maroons	94	19	.832	—	49‍–‍6	45‍–‍13
Cincinnati Outlaw Reds	69	36	.657	21	35‍–‍17	34‍–‍19
Baltimore Monumentals	58	47	.552	32	29‍–‍21	29‍–‍26
Boston Reds	58	51	.532	34	34‍–‍22	24‍–‍29
Milwaukee Brewers	8	4	.667	35½	8‍–‍4	0‍–‍0
St. Paul Saints	2	6	.250	39½	0‍–‍0	2‍–‍6
Chicago Browns/Pittsburgh Stogies	41	50	.451	42	21‍–‍19	20‍–‍31
Altoona Mountain Citys	6	19	.240	44	6‍–‍12	0‍–‍7
Wilmington Quicksteps	2	16	.111	44½	1‍–‍6	1‍–‍10
Washington Nationals (UA)	47	65	.420	46½	36‍–‍27	11‍–‍38
Philadelphia Keystones	21	46	.313	50	14‍–‍21	7‍–‍25
Kansas City Cowboys	16	63	.203	61	11‍–‍23	5‍–‍40

==== Union Association eight-team standings ====
Union Association
Team	W	L	Pct.	GB	Home	Road
St. Louis Maroons	94	19	.832	—	49–6	45–13
Cincinnati Outlaw Reds	69	36	.657	21	35–17	34–19
Baltimore Monumentals	58	47	.552	32	29–21	29–26
Boston Reds	58	51	.532	34	34–22	24–29
Chicago Browns/Pittsburgh Stogies / St. Paul Saints	43	56	.434	43	21–19	22–37
Washington Nationals (UA)	47	65	.420	46½	36–27	11–38
Philadelphia Keystones / Wilmington Quicksteps / Milwaukee Brewers	31	66	.320	55	23–31	8–35
Altoona Mountain Citys / Kansas City Cowboys	22	82	.212	67½	17–35	5–47

=== Tie games ===
35 tie games (19 in AA, 10 in NL, 6 in UA), which are not factored into winning percentage or games behind (and were often replayed again), occurred throughout the season.

==== American Association ====
- Baltimore Orioles, 2
- Brooklyn Atlantics, 5
- Cincinnati Red Stockings, 3
- Columbus Buckeyes, 2
- Indianapolis Hoosiers, 3
- Louisville Eclipse, 2
- New York Metropolitans, 5
- Philadelphia Athletics, 1
- Pittsburgh Alleghenys, 2
- Richmond Virginians, 4
- St. Louis Browns, 3
- Toledo Blue Stockings, 6

==== National League ====
- Boston Beaneaters, 5
- Buffalo Bisons, 4
- Chicago White Stockings, 1
- Cleveland Blues, 1
- Detroit Wolverines, 2
- New York Gothams, 4
- Philadelphia Quakers, 1
- Providence Grays, 2

==== Union Association ====
- Baltimore Monumentals, 1
- Boston Reds, 2
- Chicago Browns/Pittsburgh Stogies, 2
- Kansas City Cowboys, 3
- St. Louis Maroons, 1
- St. Paul Saints, 1
- Washington Nationals, 2

== Postseason ==
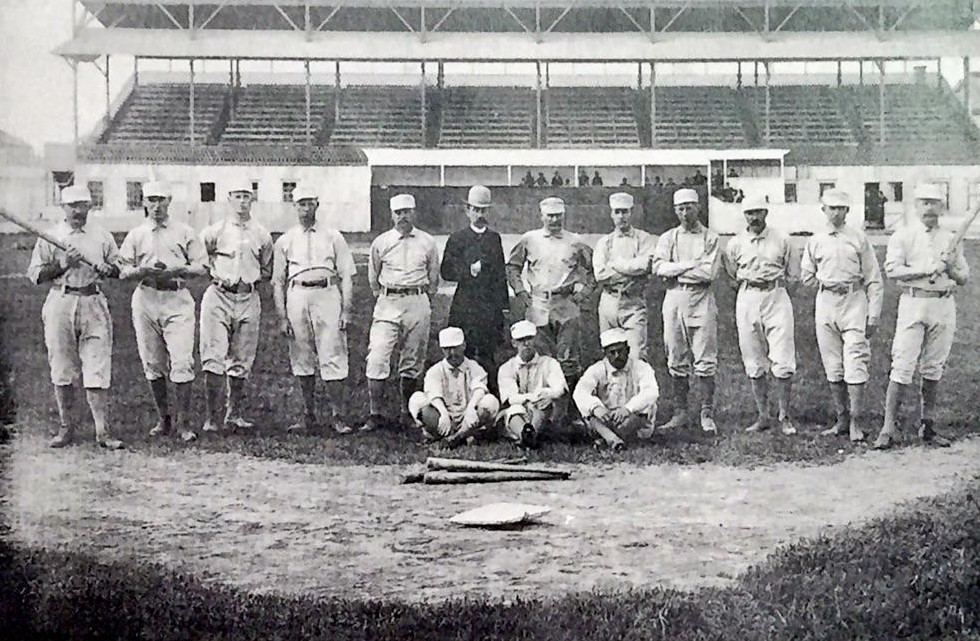
1884 Providence Grays

=== Bracket ===
World's Championship Series
AA	New York Metropolitans	0	1	2
NL	Providence Grays	6	3^{7}	12^{6}

== Managerial changes ==
=== Off-season ===
Team	Former Manager	New Manager
Cincinnati Red Stockings	Pop Snyder	Will White
Cleveland Blues	Frank Bancroft	Charlie Hackett
Columbus Buckeyes	Horace Phillips	Gus Schmelz
Louisville Eclipse	Joe Gerhardt	Mike Walsh
New York Gothams	John Clapp	John Montgomery Ward
Philadelphia Quakers	Blondie Purcell	Harry Wright
Pittsburgh Alleghenys	Joe Battin	Denny McKnight
Providence Grays	Harry Wright	Frank Bancroft
St. Louis Browns	Charles Comiskey	Jimmy Williams

=== In-season ===
Team	Former Manager	New Manager
Altoona Mountain Citys	Ed Curtis	Team folded mid-way through the season
Chicago Browns/Pittsburgh Stogies	Ed Hengel	Joe Battin
Chicago Browns/Pittsburgh Stogies	Joe Battin	Joe Ellick
Chicago Browns/Pittsburgh Stogies	Joe Ellick	Team folded mid-way through the season
Cincinnati Outlaw Reds	Dan O'Leary	Sam Crane
Cincinnati Red Stockings	Will White	Pop Snyder
Indianapolis Hoosiers	Jim Gifford	Bill Watkins
Kansas City Cowboys	Team enfranchised mid-season	Harry Wheeler
Kansas City Cowboys	Harry Wheeler	Matthew Porter
Kansas City Cowboys	Matthew Porter	Ted Sullivan
Milwaukee Brewers	Team transferred from minor league Northwestern League mid-way through the season	Tom Loftus
New York Gothams	John Montgomery Ward	Jim Price
Philadelphia Keystones	Fergy Malone	Team folded mid-way through the season
Pittsburgh Alleghenys	Denny McKnight	Bob Ferguson
Pittsburgh Alleghenys	Bob Ferguson	Joe Battin
Pittsburgh Alleghenys	Joe Battin	George Creamer
Pittsburgh Alleghenys	George Creamer	Horace Phillips
St. Louis Browns	Jimmy Williams	Charles Comiskey
St. Louis Maroons	Ted Sullivan	Fred Dunlap
St. Paul Saints	Team transferred from minor league Northwestern League mid-way through the season	Andrew Thompson
Washington Nationals (AA)	Holly Hollingshead	John Bickerton
Wilmington Quicksteps	Team transferred from minor league Eastern League mid-way through the season	Joe Simmons
Wilmington Quicksteps	Joe Simmons	Team folded mid-way through the season

== League leaders ==
Any team shown in small text indicates a previous team a player was on during the season.
Any team shown in italics indicates a team a player was on from a different league. Any stat from said different league is not calculated to determine the league leader.

=== American Association ===
Hitting leaders
Stat	Player	Total
AVG	Dave Orr (NYM)	.354
OPS	John Reilly (CIN)	.918
HR	John Reilly (CIN)	11
RBI	Dave Orr (NYM)	112
R	Harry Stovey (PHA)	124
H	Dave Orr (NYM)	162

Pitching leaders
Stat	Player	Total
W	Guy Hecker^{1} (LOU)	52
L	Larry McKeon (IND)	41
ERA	Guy Hecker^{1} (LOU)	1.80
K	Guy Hecker^{1} (LOU)	385
IP	Guy Hecker (LOU)	670.2
SV	Thomas Burns (BAL/WIL); Frank Mountain (COL); Hank O'Day (TOL)	1
WHIP	Guy Hecker (LOU)	0.868

^{1} American Association Triple Crown pitching winner

=== National League ===
Hitting leaders
Stat	Player	Total
AVG	King Kelly (CHI)	.354
OPS	Dan Brouthers (BUF)	.941
HR	Ed Williamson (CHI)	27
RBI	Cap Anson (CHI)	102
R	King Kelly (CHI)	120
H	Jim O'Rourke (BUF); Ezra Sutton (BSN)	162

Pitching leaders
Stat	Player	Total
W	Charles Radbourn^{2 3} (PRO)	60
L	John Harkins (CLE)	32
ERA	Charles Radbourn^{2} (PRO)	1.38
K	Charles Radbourn^{2} (PRO)	441
IP	Charles Radbourn (PRO)	678.2
SV	John Morrill (BSN)	2
WHIP	Charlie Sweeney (SLM/PRO)	0.824

^{2} National League Triple Crown pitching winner
^{3} All-time single-season wins record

=== Union Association ===
Hitting leaders
Stat	Player	Total
AVG	Fred Dunlap (SLM)	.412
OPS	Fred Dunlap (SLM)	1.069
HR	Fred Dunlap (SLM)	13
RBI	Unavailable	
R	Fred Dunlap (SLM)	160
H	Fred Dunlap (SLM)	185

Pitching leaders
Stat	Player	Total
W	Bill Sweeney (BLU)	40
L	Jersey Bakley (KC/WIL/PHK)	30
ERA	Jim McCormick (COR/CLE)	1.54
K	Hugh Daily (WST/CUN)	483
IP	Bill Sweeney (BLU)	538.0
SV	Billy Taylor (PHA/SLM)	4
WHIP	Jim McCormick (COR/CLE)	0.786

== Milestones ==
=== Batters ===
==== Cycles ====
- Jim O'Rourke (BUF):
  - O'Rourke hit for his first cycle and second in franchise history, on June 16 against the Chicago White Stockings.

==== Other batting accomplishments ====
- Ned Williamson (CHI):
  - Became the first player to hit three home runs in one game in a 12–2 win over the Detroit Wolverines on May 30.

=== Pitchers ===
==== No-hitters ====
- Al Atkinson (BLU/CUN/PHA):
  - Atkinson threw his first career no-hitter and the first no-hitter in Philadelphia Athletics franchise history, by defeating the Pittsburgh Alleghenys 10–1 on May 24.
- Ed Morris (COL):
  - Morris threw his first career no-hitter and the first no-hitter in franchise history, by defeating the Pittsburgh Alleghenys 5–0 on May 29.
- Frank Mountain (COL):
  - Mountain threw his first career no-hitter and the second no-hitter in franchise history, by defeating the Washington Nationals 12–0 on June 5.
- Larry Corcoran (CHI):
  - Corcoran threw his third career no-hitter and the third no-hitter in franchise history, by defeating the Providence Grays 6–0 on June 27.
- Pud Galvin (BUF):
  - Galvin threw his second career no-hitter and the second no-hitter in franchise history, by defeating the Detroit Wolverines 18–0 on August 4.
- Dick Burns (COR):
  - Burns threw his first career no-hitter, first no-hitter in franchise history, and first no-hitter in Union Association history, by defeating the Kansas City Cowboys 3–1 on August 26.
- Ed Cushman (MIL):
  - Cushman threw his first career no-hitter and the first no-hitter in franchise history, by defeating the Washington Nationals 5–0 on September 28.
- Sam Kimber (BRO):
  - Kimber threw his first career no-hitter and the first no-hitter in franchise history, in a scoreless, 10-inning tie against the Toledo Blue Stockings on October 4. Kimber walked five and struck out six. It is the first no-hitter that did not result in a win and the only no-hitter to result in a tie.

==== Other pitching accomplishments ====
- Charlie Sweeney (SLM/PRO):
  - Set a Major League record for most strikeouts in a single game as a part of the Providence Grays, throwing 19 strikeouts in a 2–1 win over the Boston Beaneaters on June 7. The record, in a nine-inning game, would not be broken until Roger Clemens threw 20 strikeouts in 1986.
- Hugh Daily (WST/CUN):
  - Tied a Major League record and set a Union Association record for most strikeouts in a single game as a part of the Chicago Browns, throwing 19 strikeouts in a 10–4 win over the Boston Reds on July 7.
- Henry Porter (MIL):
  - Set a Major League record for most strikeouts in a single game while still losing, throwing 18 strikeouts in a 5–4 loss to the Boston Reds on October 3. This record will be broken in 1969 by Steve Carlton.
- Charles Radbourn (PRO):
  - Set a Major League record for most wins in a single season, winning 60 games. It is considered an unbreakable record, because no pitcher has made 37 or more starts in a season since Greg Maddux did so in 1991.

== Venues ==
The 1884 season saw the single-season Union Association form, and with it, there were initially eight new teams in eight venues:

- The Altoona Mountain Citys played at Columbia Park.
- The Baltimore Monumentals played at the Belair Lot.
- The Boston Reds played at Dartmouth Street Grounds.
- The Chicago Browns played at South Side Park.
- The Cincinnati Outlaw Reds played at Bank Street Grounds.
- The Philadelphia Keystones played at Keystone Park.
- The St. Louis Maroons played at Union Base Ball Park.
- The Washington Nationals played at the Capitol Grounds.

Four of these teams folded, one of which relocated cities prior to folding. All four were replaced with other teams who played in different venues:

- The Altoona Mountain Citys folded on May 31, and on June 7 were replaced with the Kansas City Cowboys and play at Athletic Park.
- The Philadelphia Keystones folded on August 7, and on August 18 were replaced with the Wilmington Quicksteps and play at Union Street Park.
- After the Chicago Browns played their August 22 game away, they relocated to Allegheny, Pennsylvania and rebranded as the Pittsburgh Stogies in time for their next five home games at Exposition Park (the second iteration that the Pittsburgh Alleghenys played early the previous season), from August 25 through August 30.
- The Wilmington Quicksteps folded on September 15 and the Pittsburgh Stogies folded on September 18. On September 27 the two vacant spots were filled respectively by minor league teams of the Milwaukee Brewers, playing at Wright Street Grounds, and the St. Paul Saints, playing at West Seventh Street Park (though never played a major league game there).

The 1884 season saw the American Association with two new teams:

- The Brooklyn Atlantics played at Washington Park.
- The Richmond Virginians, following the collapse of the Washington Nationals following their August 2 loss, began playing Major League games on August 5 at Virginia Base-Ball Park.

The 1884 season saw four teams relocate to new ballparks:

- The Buffalo Bisons leave Riverside Park (where they played for five seasons) and move to Olympic Park, where they would go on to play for two seasons through 1885, before continuing on as a minor league team.
- The Cincinnati Red Stockings leave Bank Street Grounds (where they played for three seasons) and move to American Park, where they would go on to play for 18 seasons through 1901.
- The New York Metropolitans attempted to leave the Polo Grounds at the start of the season, playing the majority of home games at nearby Metropolitan Park. However, this stay would not last. Aside from a five-game stretch from July 17–22 where they returned to the Polo Grounds, they permanently left the park after their August 23 game. Prior to leaving, the park had been labeled "The Dump" by players and other observers (especially sports reporters working for the Brooklyn Eagle). Following a long road trip, their next home game saw them move back to the Polo Grounds for another 15 games for the rest of the season, where they would stay for the following season.
- The Pittsburgh Alleghenys leave Exposition Park (where they played for two seasons) and move to Recreation Park, where they would go on to play for seven seasons through 1890.

For various reasons, three teams would play home games at neutral sites:

- The Baltimore Monumentals played at Monumental Park in Baltimore, Maryland on August 25.
- The Cincinnati Red Stockings played at Washington Park at the home of the Brooklyn Atlantics in Brooklyn, New York, on October 10.
- The Pittsburgh Stogies played at Belair Lot at the home of the Baltimore Monumentals in Baltimore, Maryland.
- The Toledo Blue Stockings played at the Tri-State Fair Grounds in Toledo, Ohio, on September 13.

The Indianapolis Hoosiers hosted 11 Sunday games at the Bruce Grounds north of Indianapolis city limits in Center Township on May 18, 25, June 22, 29, July 6, 13, 20, August 3, 10, 31, and September 21.

== See also ==
- 1884 in baseball (Events, Births, Deaths)
