= List of former Major League Baseball stadiums =

The following is a list of ballparks previously used by professional baseball teams.

In addition to the current National (NL) and American (AL) leagues, Major League Baseball recognizes four short-lived other leagues as "major" for at least some portion of their histories; three of them played only in the 19th century, while a fourth played two years in the 1910s. These leagues are the American Association (AA), 1882–1891; the Union Association (UA), 1884; the Players' League (PL), 1890; and the Federal League (FL), 1914–1915. This list includes all ballparks that served as regular home fields for teams throughout all six circuits' histories as major leagues.

All playing fields are natural grass unless otherwise noted.

| Location | Stadium | MLB team(s) | Opened | Closed | Notes | Ref(s) |
|---|---|---|---|---|---|---|
| Altoona, Pennsylvania | Columbia Park | Altoona Mountain City (UA, 1884) | 1884 | | | |
| Arlington, Texas | Arlington Stadium | Texas Rangers (AL, 1972–1993) | 1965 | 1993 | A portion of the former stadium site is AT&T Way, an access road to AT&T Stadium, while another portion is a parking lot for the Arlington Convention Center. | |
| Arlington, Texas | Globe Life Park in Arlington; Rangers Ballpark in Arlington; Ameriquest Field in Arlington; The Ballpark in Arlington | Texas Rangers (AL, 1994–2019) | 1994 | 2019 | Stadium converted to football and soccer use as Choctaw Stadium; to be used by the Arlington Renegades of the UFL and North Texas SC of USL League One. | |
| Atlanta, Georgia | Atlanta–Fulton County Stadium | Atlanta Braves (NL, 1966–1996) | 1965 | 1996 | Former stadium site to be converted for baseball by Georgia State University. | |
| Atlanta, Georgia | Turner Field | Atlanta Braves (NL, 1997–2016) | 1996 | 2016 | Stadium rebuilt as Center Parc Stadium. | |
| Baltimore, Maryland | Newington Park | Baltimore Orioles (AA, 1882) | | | Replaced by Ames Memorial United Methodist. | |
| Baltimore, Maryland | Huntington Avenue Park; Oriole Park I | Baltimore Orioles (AA, 1882–1889) | | | Now residential and commercial | |
| Baltimore, Maryland | Belair Lot | Baltimore Monumentals (UA, 1884) | | | Now occupied by commercial buildings and vacant lots. | |
| Baltimore, Maryland | Oriole Park II | Baltimore Orioles (AA, 1890–1891) | 1890 | | Now residential and commercial | |
| Baltimore, Maryland | Union Park; Oriole Park III | Baltimore Orioles (AA, 1891); Baltimore Orioles (NL, 1892–1899) | 1891 | | Now a residential area. | |
| Baltimore, Maryland | Oriole Park IV | Baltimore Orioles (AL, 1901–1902) | 1901 | 1915 | | |
| Baltimore, Maryland | Terrapin Park; Oriole Park V | Baltimore Terrapins (FL, 1914–1915) | 1914 | 1944 | Now commercial businesses | |
| Baltimore, Maryland | Memorial Stadium | Baltimore Orioles (AL, 1954–1991) | 1922 | 1998 | Developed into a recreational baseball/football field in 2010 named after Cal Ripken named Cal Ripken Senior Youth Development Field with home plate remaining in the same location as is where this venue once stood. | |
| Bloomington, Minnesota | Metropolitan Stadium | Minnesota Twins (AL, 1961–1981) | 1956 | 1981 | Now site of the Mall Of America. | |
| Boston, Massachusetts | South End Grounds; Walpole Street Grounds | Boston Beaneaters/Braves (NL, 1876–1914) | 1871 | 1914 | Former sites of the Grandstand and the infield now occupies Northeastern University's Interdisciplinary Science and Engineering Complex between the Columbus Parking Garage which occupies the former location of outfield and the Ruggles Station of the Orange Line of the MBTA where a commemorative marker is located. | |
| Boston, Massachusetts | Dartmouth Grounds | Boston Reds (UA, 1884) | | | Copley Place | |
| Boston, Massachusetts | Congress Street Grounds | Boston Reds (PL, 1890); Boston Reds (AA, 1891); Boston Beaneaters (NL, 1894) | 1890 | 1894 | Location is now home to several office buildings and the alley behind them, which would go through the area of outfield, was used in the 2006 film 'The Departed'' in a key scene where Martin Sheen's character is pushed off a roof. | |
| Boston, Massachusetts | Huntington Avenue Grounds | Boston Red Sox (AL, 1901–1911) | 1901 | 1911 | Site now occupied by The Cabot Center, an indoor athletic venue for several indoor athletic teams of Northeastern University. | |
| Boston, Massachusetts | Braves Field^{[b]} The Bee Hive | Boston Braves/Bees (NL, 1915–1952) | 1915 | 1952 | Now Nickerson Field | |
| Bronx, New York | Yankee Stadium I | New York Yankees (AL, 1923–1973, 1976–2008) | 1923 | 2008 | Converted into a Public Park called Heritage Field. | |
| Brooklyn, New York | Union Grounds | Brooklyn Hartfords (NL, 1877) | 1862 | 1883 | Juan Morel Campos Secondary School and Marcy Avenue Armory | |
| Brooklyn, New York | Washington Park | Brooklyn Atlantics (AA, 1884); Brooklyn Dodgers (NL, 1884–1891; 1898–1912); Brooklyn Tip Tops (FL, 1914–1915) | 1883 | 1915 | Original site now residential; second site now a Consolidated Edison facility | |
| Brooklyn, New York | Eastern Park | Brooklyn Ward's Wonders (PL, 1890); Brooklyn Dodgers (NL, 1891–1897) | 1890 | ? | Commercial and industrial businesses | |
| Brooklyn, New York | Ebbets Field | Brooklyn Dodgers (NL, 1913–1957) | 1913 | 1957 | Ebbets Field Apartments | |
| Buffalo, New York | Riverside Park | Buffalo Bisons (NL, 1879–1883) | 1878 | 1883 | Now part of the Prospect Hill Residential Neighborhood. | |
| Buffalo, New York | Olympic Park I | Buffalo Bisons (NL, 1884–1885) | 1884 | 1888 | Currently occupies the Richmond-Summer Recreation Center and a residential neighborhood. | |
| Buffalo, New York | Olympic Park II | Buffalo Bisons (PL, 1890) | 1890 | | Currently occupied by the Buffalo Academy for Visual and Performing Arts and a church. | |
| Buffalo, New York | International Fair Association Grounds | Buffalo Blues (FL, 1914–1915) | 1914 | | Now fully residential buildings. | |
| Buffalo, New York | Sahlen Field | Toronto Blue Jays (AL, 2020–2021) | 1988 | | Still in use for minor league baseball | |
| Chicago, Illinois | Lake Front Park; Union Base-Ball Grounds | Chicago White Stockings (NL, 1878–1884) | 1871 | 1884 | Now part of Grant Park, a section called Millennium Park | |
| Chicago, Illinois | 23rd Street Grounds | Chicago White Stockings (NL, 1876–1877) | 1872 | 1877 | Athletic fields | |
| Chicago, Illinois | South Side Park I | Chicago Browns (UA, 1884) | 1884 | | | |
| Chicago, Illinois | West Side Park I | Chicago White Stockings (NL, 1885–1891) | 1885 | 1891 | Now occupied by the Chicago World Language Academy. | |
| Chicago, Illinois | South Side Park II | Chicago Pirates (PL, 1890); Chicago White Stockings (NL, 1891–1892) | 1890 | 1893 | South End side was site of Comiskey Park from 1910 to 1990, now a parking lot for Guaranteed Rate Field. | |
| Chicago, Illinois | South Side Park III; 39th Street Grounds | Chicago White Sox (AL, 1901–1910) | 1893 | 1940 | The Chicago Housing Authority's Wentworth Gardens housing project currently occupies the site. | |
| Chicago, Illinois | West Side Park II | Chicago Cubs (NL, 1894–1915) | 1894 | 1920 | Site now owned by the University of Illinois, which now occupies The University of Illinois Medical Center. | |
| Chicago, Illinois | Comiskey Park; White Sox Park | Chicago White Sox (AL, 1910–1990) | 1910 | 1990 | Now a parking lot for Guaranteed Rate Field | |
| Cincinnati, Ohio | Avenue Grounds; Brighton Park | Cincinnati Reds (NL, 1876–1879) | | | Ballpark site is now occupied by railroad yards. | |
| Cincinnati, Ohio | Bank Street Grounds | Cincinnati Reds (NL, 1880); Cincinnati Reds (AA, 1882–1883); Cincinnati Outlaw Reds (UA, 1884) | | | Ballpark site is now a parking lot for the Southwest Ohio Regional Transit Authority ("SORTA") and CSX Transportation. | |
| Cincinnati, Ohio | League Park; American Park | Cincinnati Reds (AA, 1884–1889); Cincinnati Reds (NL, 1890–1901) | 1884 | 1901 | Rebuilt as Palace of the Fans | |
| Cincinnati, Ohio | East End Park; Pendleton Park | Cincinnati Kelly's Killers (AA, 1891) | 1891 | 1907? | Now Schmidt Recreational Complex; two softball fields overlap the site and two other softball fields are further west within the park; the current softball field is known as C.L. Harrison Field which approximates the original diamond, only somewhat far to the north. The right field area of the site is another softball field named Paul Kramer Field. | |
| Cincinnati, Ohio | Palace of the Fans | Cincinnati Reds (NL, 1902–1911) | 1902 | 1911 | Rebuilt as Crosley Field | |
| Cincinnati, Ohio | Crosley Field; Redland Field | Cincinnati Reds (NL, 1912–1970) | 1912 | 1970 | Several buildings now occupy the site with a street running through this site, former site of home plate has been painted in an alley, the old left field terrace area is now a parking lot, and the former field of play is now an existenion of Dalton Street. | |
| Cincinnati, Ohio | Riverfront Stadium; Cinergy Field | Cincinnati Reds (NL, 1970–2002) | 1970 | 2002 | AstroTurf (1970–2000); Grass (2001–2002); Portions of the site occupy Great American Ballpark and the National Underground Railroad Freedom Center while a small portion occupies the Reds' Hall of Fame and Museum and an extension of Main Street. | |
| Cleveland, Ohio | Kennard Street Park | Cleveland Blues (NL, 1879–1884) | | | Now commercial businesses | |
| Cleveland, Ohio | National League Park | Cleveland Spiders (AA, 1887–1888); Cleveland Spiders (NL, 1889–1890) | | | Now commercial businesses | |
| Cleveland, Ohio | Brotherhood Park | Cleveland Infants (PL, 1890) | | | Now commercial businesses | |
| Cleveland, Ohio | League Park | Cleveland Spiders (NL, 1891–1899); Cleveland Indians (AL, 1901–1946) | 1891 | 1946 | Went through an extensive renovation in 2014 and reopened as the current home of The Baseball Heritage Museum which resides in the former ticket office. The rest of the site is a public park. Local schools' youth teams still compete on the field. | |
| Cleveland, Ohio | Cleveland Stadium; Lakefront Stadium; Municipal Stadium | Cleveland Indians (AL, 1932–1993) | 1932 | 1995 | Site now is occupied by Cleveland Browns Stadium, A football stadium. | |
| Columbus, Ohio | Recreation Park | Columbus Buckeyes (AA, 1883–1884); Columbus Solons (AA, 1889–1891) | 1883 | 1897 | | |
| Denver, Colorado | Mile High Stadium | Colorado Rockies (NL, 1993–1994) | 1948 | 2001 | Now a parking lot for Empower Field at Mile High, a football stadium. | |
| Detroit, Michigan | Recreation Park | Detroit Wolverines (NL, 1881–1888) | 1881 | 1894 | Detroit Medical Center currently occupies the site. | |
| Detroit, Michigan | Bennett Park | Detroit Tigers (AL, 1901–1911) | 1896 | 1911 | Rebuilt as Navin Field | |
| Detroit, Michigan | Tiger Stadium; Briggs Stadium; Navin Field | Detroit Tigers (AL, 1912–1999) | 1912 | 2008 | Bluegrass; Officially closed in 2001, Demolished from 2008 to 2009. Stadium's actual playing field remains at the corner where the stadium once stood; redeveloped in 2018 for youth sports, as Corner Ballpark. | |
| Dunedin, Florida | TD Ballpark | Toronto Blue Jays (AL, 2021) | 1990 | | Still in use for minor league baseball and spring training | |
| Hartford, Connecticut | Hartford Ball Club Grounds | Hartford Dark Blues (NL, 1876) | 1874 | | Now occupied by the Church of the Good Shepherd. | |
| Houston, Texas | Colt Stadium | Houston Colt .45s (NL, 1962–1964) | 1962 | 1964 | Dismantled and sent to Mexico for uses in two Mexican Cities. | |
| Houston, Texas | Houston Astrodome^{†} | Houston Astros (NL, 1965–1999) | 1965 | 2006 | AstroTurf (1966–1999); Stadium is closed but still standing | |
| Indianapolis, Indiana | South Street Park | Indianapolis Blues (NL, 1878) | | | Currently a parking lot for Gainbridge Fieldhouse, an indoor arena primarily used for basketball. | |
| Indianapolis, Indiana | Tinker Park; Athletic Park; Seventh Street Park | Indianapolis Hoosiers (AA, 1884) | | | Now occupied by the Methodist Hospital of Indianapolis. | |
| Indianapolis, Indiana | Federal League Park | Indianapolis Hoosiers (FL, 1914) | 1913 | 1916 | | |
| Kansas City, Missouri | Association Park | Kansas City Cowboys (UA, 1884); Kansas City Cowboys (NL, 1886); Kansas City Cowboys (AA, 1888) | | | Currently site of Al-Taqwa Islamic Center | |
| Kansas City, Missouri | Exposition Park | Kansas City Cowboys (AA, 1888–1889) | | | Now commercial and industrial | |
| Kansas City, Missouri | Gordon and Koppel Field | Kansas City Packers (FL, 1914–1915) | | | Now a public park called Kiely Park, which also contains a few commercial businesses, primarily restaurants. | |
| Kansas City, Missouri | Municipal Stadium | Kansas City Athletics (AL, 1955–1967); Kansas City Royals (AL, 1969–1972) | 1925 | 1972 | Former ballpark site to be redeveloped with new single family homes. | |
| Las Vegas, Nevada | Cashman Field | Oakland Athletics (AL, 1996) | 1983 | | Oakland played their first six home games there in 1996, while the Coliseum was being renovated for football purposes. It is now a soccer stadium. | |
| Los Angeles, California | Los Angeles Memorial Coliseum | Los Angeles Dodgers (NL, 1958–1961) | 1923 | § | Had the largest capacity of any MLB stadium to date. Still in use for football and other sports. | |
| Los Angeles, California | Wrigley Field | Los Angeles Angels (AL, 1961) | 1925 | 1961 | Location of the original Wrigley Diamond and the original grandstands now occupied by both The Kedren Community Mental Health Center and another parking lot. | |
| Louisville, Kentucky | Louisville Baseball Park | Louisville Grays (NL, 1876–1877) | | | Since been developed into an upper-class neighborhood known as St. James Court. | |
| Louisville, Kentucky | Eclipse Park I | Louisville Eclipse (AA, 1882–1884); Louisville Colonels (AA, 1885–1891); Louisville Colonels (NL, 1892) | 1874 | 1893 | Now Elliott Park, a public park | |
| Louisville, Kentucky | Eclipse Park II | Louisville Colonels (NL, 1893–1893) | 1893 | 1899 | Now commercial businesses | |
| Manhattan, New York | Polo Grounds I | New York Giants (NL, 1883–1888); New York Metropolitans (AA, 1883–1885) | 1880 | 1888 | Apartment buildings | |
| Manhattan, New York | Metropolitan Park | New York Metropolitans (AA, 1884) | 1884 | 1884 | Now occupied by a complex of residential, commercial, and school buildings. | |
| Manhattan, New York | Polo Grounds II | New York Giants (NL, 1889–1890) | 1889 | 1910 | Rebuilt as Polo Grounds III | |
| Manhattan, New York | Polo Grounds III | New York Giants (PL, 1890); New York Giants (NL, 1891–1957); New York Yankees (AL, 1913–1922); New York Mets (NL, 1962–1963) | 1890 | 1963 | Now the present site of the Polo Grounds Towers. | |
| Manhattan, New York | Hilltop Park | New York Yankees (AL, 1903–1912) | 1903 | 1914 | Current site of New York-Presbyterian/ Columbia University Irving Medical Center since 1928. | |
| Miami Gardens, Florida | Hard Rock Stadium; Sun Life Stadium; Joe Robbie Stadium; Pro Player Park/Stadium; Dolphin(s) Stadium; Land Shark Stadium | Florida Marlins (NL, 1993–2011) | 1987 | § | Still in use for football | |
| Milwaukee, Wisconsin | Eclipse Park | Milwaukee Grays (NL, 1878) | | | Site is now part of Interstate 43 along with the northern quadrant of the Marquette Interchange. | |
| Milwaukee, Wisconsin | Wright Street Grounds | Milwaukee Brewers (UA, 1884) | 1884 | | Now residential | |
| Milwaukee, Wisconsin | Athletic Park; Borchert Field | Milwaukee Brewers (AA, 1881) | 1887 | 1952 | Former stadium site and the entire block of the former venue are now part of Interstate 43; just north of exit 74 (Locust Street), many of the houses on 7th and 8th streets facing the ballpark still exist but now face the freeway with 7th and 8th streets effectively becoming service roads for I-43. | |
| Milwaukee, Wisconsin | Lloyd Street Grounds | Milwaukee Brewers (AL, 1901) | 1895 | 1903 | Now residential | |
| Milwaukee, Wisconsin | Milwaukee County Stadium | Milwaukee Braves (NL, 1953–1965); Milwaukee Brewers (AL, 1970–1997); Milwaukee Brewers (NL, 1998–2000) | 1953 | 2000 | Most of the playing field is now Helfaer Field, a youth baseball venue; most of the stadium site is now a parking lot for American Family Field. | |
| Minneapolis, Minnesota | Hubert H. Humphrey Metrodome^{†} | Minnesota Twins (AL, 1982–2009) | 1982 | 2013 | SuperTurf (1982–1986); AstroTurf (1987–2003); FieldTurf (2004–2010); Now site of U.S. Bank Stadium, a football stadium convertible to baseball use. | |
| Montreal, Quebec | Jarry Park Stadium^{[c]} | Montreal Expos (NL, 1969–1976) | 1969 | 1976 | Now Uniprix Stadium, a tennis venue | |
| Montreal, Quebec | Olympic Stadium^{†} | Montreal Expos (NL, 1977–2004) | 1976 | § | Grass (1976); AstroTurf (1977–2001); Defargo Astrograss (2002–2003); FieldTurf (2003–2004) | |
| Newark, New Jersey | Harrison Park | Newark Pepper (FL, 1915) | 1915 | 1923 | Currently an industrial plant. An Otis Elevator Company factory once stood across the street to the west of the site, near the river. | |
| Oakland, California | Oakland Coliseum | Oakland Athletics (AL, 1968–2024) | 1966 | | Will now be used as the home stadium for the Oakland Roots and Oakland Soul soccer teams. | |
| Philadelphia, Pennsylvania | Jefferson Street Grounds; Athletics Park | Philadelphia Athletics (NL, 1876) Philadelphia Athletics (AA, 1883–1890) | 1871 | 1890 | Ballfield still exists in a revised form, however, the ballpark site is occupied by various structures including Schools and Recreation Centers. | |
| Philadelphia, Pennsylvania | Oakdale Park | Philadelphia Athletics (AA, 1882) | 1882 | | Now residential and commercial | |
| Philadelphia, Pennsylvania | Recreation Park | Philadelphia Phillies (NL, 1883–1886) | | | A mini market currently stands on the corner where homeplate once stood while urban housing occupies the area. | |
| Philadelphia, Pennsylvania | Keystone Park | Philadelphia Keystones (UA, 1884) | | | Now residential and commercial | |
| Philadelphia, Pennsylvania | Baker Bowl | Philadelphia Phillies (NL, 1887–1938) | 1887 | 1938 | Now a homeless shelter. | |
| Philadelphia, Pennsylvania | Forepaugh Park | Philadelphia Quakers (PL, 1890); Philadelphia Athletics (AA, 1891) | | | Now residential and commercial | |
| Philadelphia, Pennsylvania | Columbia Park | Philadelphia Athletics (AL, 1901–1908) | 1901 | 1908 | Presently used for residential homes. | |
| Philadelphia, Pennsylvania | Shibe Park; Connie Mack Stadium | Philadelphia Athletics (AL, 1909–1954); Philadelphia Phillies (NL, 1938–1970) | 1909 | 1970 | Now present site of The Deliverance Evangelistic Church. | |
| Philadelphia, Pennsylvania | Veterans Stadium | Philadelphia Phillies (NL, 1971–2003) | 1971 | 2003 | AstroTurf (1971–2000); NexTurf (2001–2003); Now a parking lot for both Citizens Bank Park and Lincoln Financial Field. | |
| Pittsburgh, Pennsylvania | Exposition Park I | Pittsburgh Alleghenys (AA, 1882) | 1882 | 1882 | Replaced by Exposition Park II | |
| Pittsburgh, Pennsylvania | Exposition Park II | Pittsburgh Alleghenys (AA, 1883); Pittsburgh Stogies (UA, 1884) | 1883 | 1915 | Remodeled as Exposition Park III | |
| Pittsburgh, Pennsylvania | Recreation Park | Pittsburgh Alleghenys (AA, 1884–1886); Pittsburgh Alleghenys (NL, 1887–1890) | 1876 | 1904 | Now a site of industrial buildings | |
| Pittsburgh, Pennsylvania | Exposition Park III | Pittsburgh Burghers (PL, 1890); Pittsburgh Pirates (NL, 1891–1909); Pittsburgh Rebels (FL, 1914–1915) | 1890 | 1915 | Interstate 279 currently runs over portions of the site of Exposition Park just before crossing the Allegheny River along the Fort Duquesne Bridge. | |
| Pittsburgh, Pennsylvania | Forbes Field | Pittsburgh Pirates (NL, 1909–1970) | 1909 | 1970 | University of Pittsburgh buildings and a park, along with part of the outfield wall | |
| Pittsburgh, Pennsylvania | Three Rivers Stadium | Pittsburgh Pirates (NL, 1970–2000) | 1970 | 2000 | Tartanturf (1970–1982); AstroTurf (1983–2000); A portion of the site now houses the Pittsburgh Post-Gazette's office building; another portion of this site contains Stage AE, a multi-purpose entertainment complex with other portions containing the studios of AT&T Sportsnet Pittsburgh, which are housed in an office building which also hosts the headquarters of StarKist Tuna and the regional headquarters of Del Monte Foods as the Pittsburgh Steelers retain developmental rights to the site; the site is mostly a parking lot otherwise. | |
| Providence, Rhode Island | Messer Street Grounds | Providence Grays (NL, 1878–1885) | 1878 | 1887 | Now occupied by residential buildings. | |
| Queens, New York | Ridgewood Park | Brooklyn Bridegrooms (AA, 1886–1889); Brooklyn Gladiators (AA, 1890) | 1883 | 1959 | Now commercial and residential | |
| Queens, New York | Shea Stadium | New York Mets (NL, 1964–2008); New York Yankees (AL, 1974–1975) | 1964 | 2008 | Now a parking lot for Citi Field | |
| Richmond, Virginia | Allen Pasture | Richmond Virginians (AA, 1884) | | | | |
| Rochester, New York | Culver Field | Rochester Broncos (AA, 1890) | 1886 | 1907 | Now a Gleason Works manufacturing plant. | |
| St. Louis, Missouri | Sportsman's Park; Busch Stadium | St. Louis Browns (AA, 1882–1891); St. Louis Browns (NL, 1892); St. Louis Browns (AL, 1902–1953); St. Louis Cardinals (NL, 1920–1966) | 1881 | 1966 | Now site of Herbert Hoover Boys & Girls Club. Field now used for other sports. | |
| St. Louis, Missouri | Union Grounds | St. Louis Maroons (UA, 1884); St. Louis Maroons (NL, 1885–1886) | 1884 | 1888 | Now industrial buildings | |
| St. Louis, Missouri | Robison Field; New Sportsman's Park | St. Louis Browns/Cardinals (NL, 1893–1920) | 1893 | 1926 | Was site of Beaumont High School (St. Louis) for 88 years until closing in 2014; now vacant. | |
| St. Louis, Missouri | Handlan's Park | St. Louis Terriers (FL, 1914–1915) | 1914? | 1920s | A marker of the site is currently on the campus of St. Louis University. | |
| St. Louis, Missouri | Busch Memorial Stadium; Busch Stadium | St. Louis Cardinals (NL, 1966–2005) | 1966 | 2005 | AstroTurf (1970–1995); Now site of St. Louis Ballpark Village | |
| Saint Paul, Minnesota | Fort Street Grounds | St. Paul Saints (UA, 1884) | | | Now occupied by residential buildings | |
| San Diego, California | San Diego Stadium; SDCCU Stadium; Qualcomm Stadium; Jack Murphy Stadium | San Diego Padres (NL, 1969–2003) | 1967 | 2020 | Bandera Bermuda Grass; Demolished from 2020 to 2021; The former venues' site was sold to its long time tenant, San Diego State University in August 2020. The current 35,000 capacity Snapdragon Stadium currently sits nearby the site of San Diego Stadium for the Aztec Football team, San Diego FC and San Diego Wave, it opened on September 3, 2022. | |
| San Francisco, California | Seals Stadium | San Francisco Giants (NL, 1958–1959) | 1931 | 1959 | Now a shopping center. A 50th anniversary tribute of the Giant's move to Seals Stadium occurred on April 15, 2008, at the site with another at Oracle Park to commemorate the 50th anniversary of the 1958 Opening Day. | |
| San Francisco, California | Candlestick Park; 3Com Park at Candlestick Point; Monster Park; San Francisco Stadium at Candlestick Point | San Francisco Giants (NL, 1960–1999) | 1960 | 2013 | AstroTurf (1970–1978); Grass (1960–1969, 1979–1999) | |
| San Juan, Puerto Rico | Hiram Bithorn Stadium | Montreal Expos (NL, 2003–2004) | 1962 | | Still in use for minor league baseball | |
| Seattle, Washington | Sick's Stadium | Seattle Pilots (AL, 1969) | 1932 | 1976 | Site now occupied by a Lowe's home improvement store. | |
| Seattle, Washington | Kingdome^{†} | Seattle Mariners (AL, 1977–1999) | 1976 | 2000 | AstroTurf; Site now occupies Lumen Field, a football and soccer stadium. | |
| Staten Island, New York | St. George Cricket Grounds | New York Metropolitans (AA, 1886–1887); New York Giants (NL, 1889) | 1886 | 1889 | Now a parking lot for Richmond County Bank Ballpark. | |
| Syracuse, New York | Newell Park | Syracuse Stars (NL, 1879) | | | Now commercial buildings | |
| Syracuse, New York | Star Park | Syracuse Stars (AA, 1890) | | | Now a power station, railroad tracks, commercial buildings | |
| Tampa, Florida | George M. Steinbrenner Field | Tampa Bay Rays (AL, 2025) | 1996 | | Still in use for minor league baseball and spring training | |
| Toledo, Ohio | League Park | Toledo Blue Stockings (AA, 1884) | | | | |
| Toledo, Ohio | Speranza Park | Toledo Maumees (AA, 1890) | | | Grounds of St. Vincent Mercy Medical Center | |
| Toronto, Ontario | Exhibition Stadium | Toronto Blue Jays (AL, 1977–1989) | 1959 | 1989 | AstroTurf; Now site of BMO Field, a soccer stadium | |
| Troy, New York | Putnam Grounds | Troy Trojans (NL, 1879) | | | | |
| Troy, New York | Haymakers' Grounds | Troy Trojans (NL, 1880–1881) | | | | |
| Troy, New York | Troy Ball Clubs Grounds | Troy Trojans (NL, 1882) | | | | |
| Washington, D.C. | Athletic Park | Washington Nationals (AA, 1884) | | | Now occupied by residences and educational-related buildings such as schools. | |
| Washington, D.C. | Capitol Grounds; Capital Park I | Washington Nationals (UA, 1884) | | | Now occupied by Russell Senate Office Building | |
| Washington, D.C. | Swampoodle Grounds; Capital Park II | Washington Nationals (NL, 1886–1889) | | | Portions of the site were eventually annexed to presently occupy the site of Washington Union Station and the main postal office which is presently the National Postal Museum. | |
| Washington, D.C. | Boundary Field; National Park I National Park III | Washington Statesmen (AA, 1891); Washington Senators (NL, 1892–1899); Washington Senators I (AL, 1903–1910) | 1891 | 1911 | Now site of Howard University Hospital. | |
| Washington, D.C. | American League Park; National Park II | Washington Senators I (AL, 1901–1902) | 1901 | 1926 | | |
| Washington, D.C. | Griffith Stadium; National Park IV | Washington Senators I (AL, 1911–1960); Washington Senators II (AL, 1961) | 1911 | 1961 | Now site of Howard University Hospital. | |
| Washington, D.C. | RFK Memorial Stadium; D.C. Stadium | Washington Senators II (AL, 1962–1971); Washington Nationals (NL, 2005–2007) | 1961 | 2019 | TifGrand Bermuda Grass (1961–2019); Closed but still standing, to be demolished in 2023 due to a fire that occurred at this venue in July 2022 resulting in a delay of demolition. | |
| Wilmington, Delaware | Union Street Park | Wilmington Quicksteps (UA, 1884) | | | | |
| Worcester, Massachusetts | Worcester Agricultural Fairgrounds; Worcester Driving Park Grounds | Worcester (NL, 1880–1882) | | | Now mostly residential | |

== See also ==
- List of current Major League Baseball stadiums
- List of Major League Baseball spring training stadiums
- List of U.S. baseball stadiums by capacity
- List of U.S. stadiums by capacity
- List of baseball parks by capacity
- List of current National Football League stadiums
- List of National Hockey League arenas
- List of Major League Soccer stadiums
- List of Major League Lacrosse stadiums
- List of National Basketball Association arenas
