= List of baseball parks in Washington, D.C. =

This is a list of venues used for professional baseball in Washington, D.C.. The information is a compilation of the information contained in the references listed.

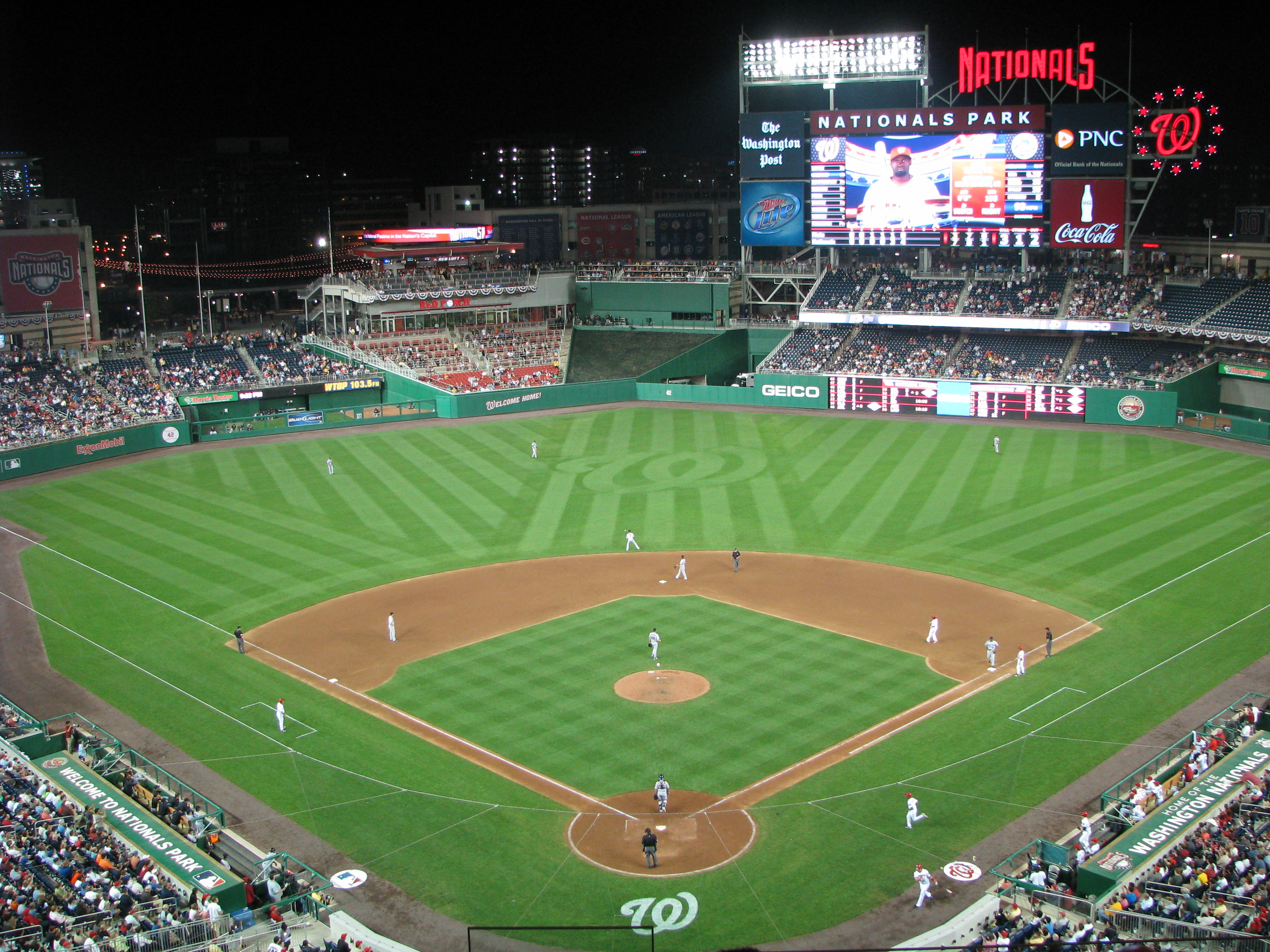
Nationals Park

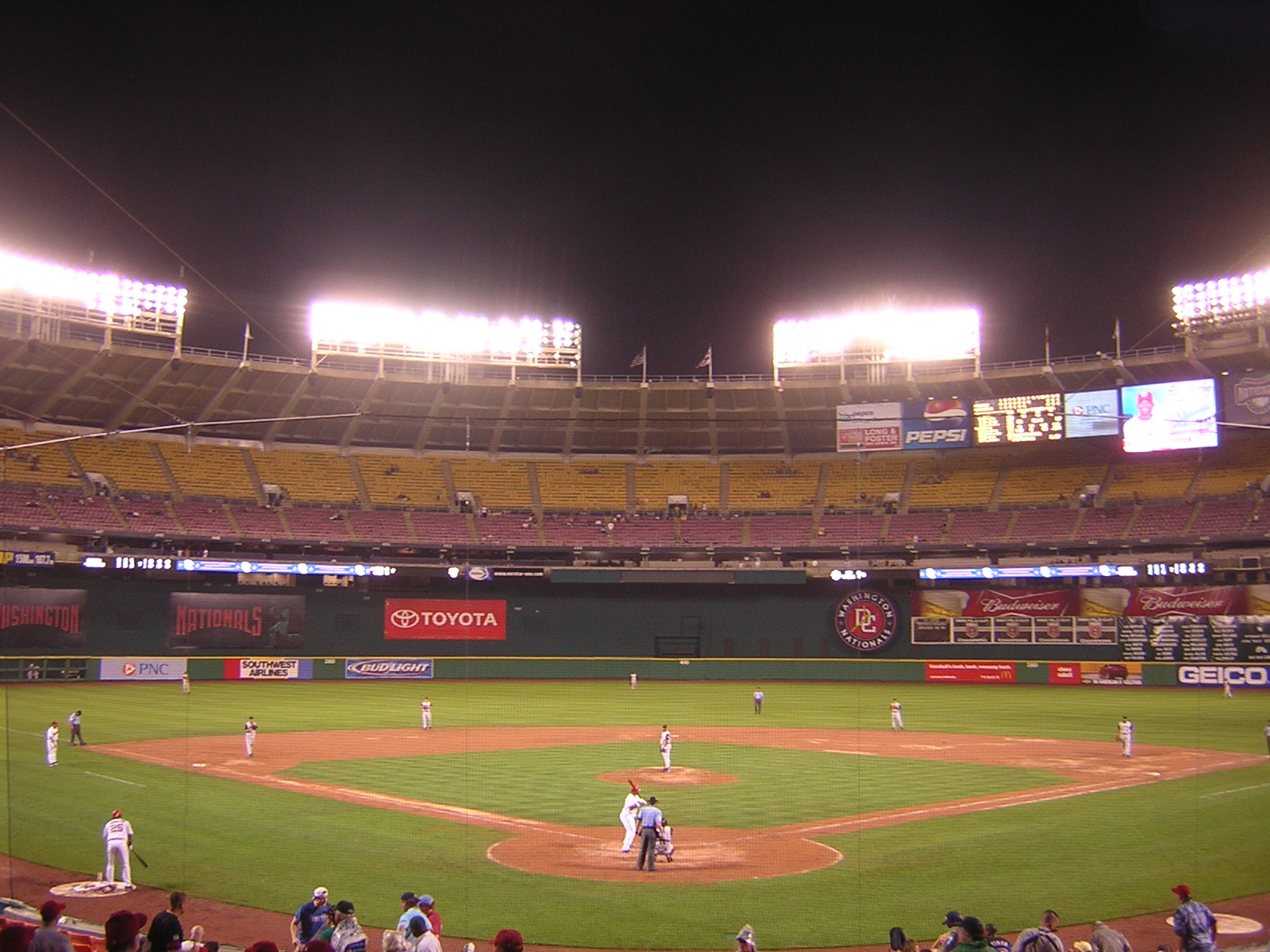
RFK Stadium

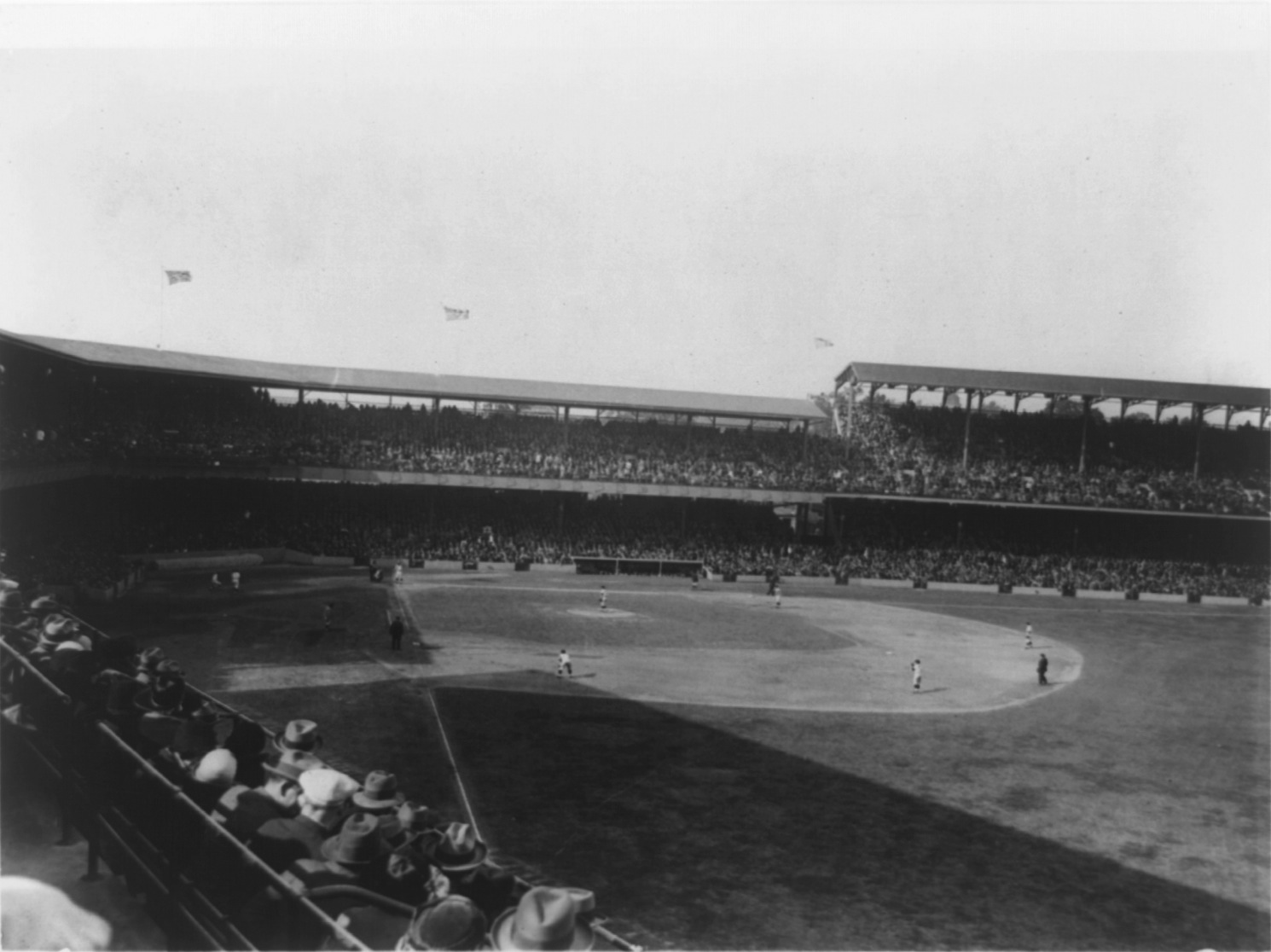
Griffith Stadium

White Lot
Home of:

National – independent (1865–1866 and some games in 1867)
Olympic – independent (1868)

Location: B Street (now Constitution Avenue) NW (south); 15th Street NW (east); D Street NW (north); 17th Street NW (west)
Currently: The Ellipse
Names:

When the Nationals leased the property, it was called "National Grounds". Example:[Washington Evening Star, November 16, 1865, p.1]
When the Olympics leased the property, it was called "Olympic Grounds". Example:

Olympic Grounds
Home of:

Olympic – independent (1870), "Blue Stockings" NA (1871–1872)
National – NA (1873)
National – independent amateur (1874–1875)
Washington - NA (1875)

Location: 16th Street NW (east); 17th Street NW (west); S Street NW (south) – about a mile west-southwest of the eventual site of Griffith Stadium
Currently: residential, commercial

National Grounds
Home of:

National – independent (1867–1871) NA (1872)
Olympic – independent (1869)

Location: 15th Street NW; S Street NW; 14th Street NW; T Street NW – "near the State Department", which at the time was at "Fourteenth Street west, corner S north", per 1870 city directory
Currently: residential, commercial

Athletic Park
Home of: Washington Nationals a.k.a. Statesmen – AA (1884 part)
Location: S Street NW (south); T Street NW (north); 9th Street NW (east); 10th Street NW (west) – about a quarter mile southwest of the eventual site of Griffith Stadium
Currently: Residential

Capitol Grounds a.k.a. Capitol Park (I) a.k.a. Union Association Park
Home of: Washington Nationals (UA) – UA (1884) / Eastern League (1885)
Location: C Street NE (north); Delaware Avenue NE (west): B Street (now Constitution Avenue) NE (south); First Street NE (east) – a couple of blocks northeast of the Capitol building
Currently: Russell Senate Office Building

Swampoodle Grounds a.k.a. Capitol Park (II)
Home of:

Washington Nationals – NL (1886–1889)
Washington Senators – Atlantic Association (1890)
Also used as a neutral site for one game in the 1887 World Series

Location: North Capitol Street NE and tracks (west, right field); F Street NE (south, center field); Delaware Avenue NE (east, left field); G Street NE (north, home plate) – a couple of blocks north of the first Capitol Park – in the Swampoodle neighborhood
Currently: National Postal Museum and Union Station National Visitors Center

Griffith Stadium orig. Boundary Field, then National Park, American League Park (II)
Home of:

Washington Senators – AA (1891), NL (1892–1899)
Washington Senators/Nationals – AL (1904-1960)
Washington Senators– AL (1961)
Homestead Grays – Negro leagues (1937–1948) part-time home

Location: Georgia Avenue (extension of 7th Street – formerly Brightwood) NW (west, first base); Florida Avenue NW, Bohrer Street NW, and U Street NW (south, right field); 5th Street NW (east, left/center field); Howard University buildings and W Street NW (north, third base)
Currently: Howard University Hospital

American League Park (I)
Home of: Washington Senators/Nationals – AL (1901–1903)
Location: Florida Avenue NE (southwest, first base); Trinidad Avenue NE (northwest, third base)
Currently: Residential area

RFK Stadium orig. D.C. Stadium
Home of:

Washington Senators – AL (1962–1971)
Washington Nationals – NL (2005–2007)

Location: 2400 East Capitol Street SE – T's into 22nd Street SE (west, home plate); Independence Avenue SE (south/southeast, right field); C Street NE (north/northeast, left field)
Currently: demolished; to be replaced by the New Stadium at RFK Campus

Nationals Park
Home of: Washington Nationals – NL (2008–present)
Location: 1500 South Capitol Street SE – Capitol Street (west, third base); N Street SE (north, left-center field); 1st Street SE (east, right field); Potomac Avenue SE (south, first base)

== See also ==
- Lists of baseball parks
