= List of San Francisco Giants managers =

The San Francisco Giants are a Major League Baseball team that plays in the National League Western Division. Beginning with John Clapp, who managed the team at their inception as the New York Gothams in 1883, 42 managers have been employed by the Giants. A team manager's duties include team strategy and leadership on and off the field.

The aforementioned first manager, John Clapp, managed the team for one year before being replaced in 1884 by Jim Price. The New York Giants won two World Series championships during the 19th century, in 1888 and 1889, with Jim Mutrie as their manager both years.^{[a]} John McGraw became the Giants' manager during the 1902 season, beginning a 54-year streak during which the Giants were managed by a Baseball Hall of Famer. McGraw managed for the better course of 30 years (he missed parts of the 1924, 1925, and 1927 seasons due to illness; Hughie Jennings took over for the former two while Rogers Hornsby served as player-manager for the latter), doing so until the middle of the 1932 season, the longest managerial tenure in Giants history. McGraw won 2,583 games as the Giants manager, the most in Giants history. While managing the Giants, the team won the National League championship 10 times—in 1904, 1905, 1911, 1912, 1913, 1917, 1921, 1922, 1923 and 1924. They played in the World Series nine times (no World Series was played in 1904) and won three, in 1905, 1921 and 1922.

McGraw's successor was Hall of Famer Bill Terry, who managed the team from the middle of the 1932 season until 1941. He won 823 games as the Giants' manager, fourth-most in Giants history, and won three National League championships, in 1933, 1936 and 1937, winning the World Series in 1933. Hall of Famers Mel Ott and Leo Durocher managed the team from 1942 through 1955. Durocher was the manager for the Giants' World Series championship in 1954.

The Giants moved from New York to San Francisco in 1958, with Bill Rigney as their manager. They won their first National League championship in San Francisco under Alvin Dark in 1962 but lost the World Series that year. In their first 28 years in San Francisco, they had 14 managers (including two terms by Rigney). Since 1985, the Giants' managerial situation has been more stable. Roger Craig managed the team for more than seven seasons, from the middle of the 1985 season until 1992, including a National League championship in 1989. His successor, Dusty Baker, managed the team for ten years from 1993 through 2002, winning the National League championship in 2002. Baker has the third-highest win total of any Giants manager with 840. Felipe Alou replaced Baker in 2003 and managed the team until 2006. Bruce Bochy managed the team from the 2007 season through 2019, winning World Series championships in 2010, 2012, and 2014, and has the second-most wins among all Giants managers.

Jim Mutrie has the highest winning percentage of any Giants manager, with .605. Heinie Smith has the lowest, with .156, although he managed just 32 games. The lowest winning percentage of any Giants manager who managed at least 100 games is .389, by Jim Davenport in 1985.

== Table key ==
#	A running total of the number of Giants managers. Any manager who has two or more separate terms is only counted once.
G	Number of regular season games managed; may not equal sum of wins and losses due to tie games
W	Number of regular season wins in games managed
L	Number of regular season losses in games managed
WPct	Winning percentage: number of wins divided by number of games managed
PA	Playoff appearances: number of years this manager has led the franchise to the playoffs
PW	Playoff wins: number of wins this manager has accrued in the playoffs
PL	Playoff losses: number of losses this manager has accrued in the playoffs
LC	League Championships: number of League Championships, or pennants, achieved by the manager
WS	World Series: number of World Series victories achieved by the manager
†	Elected to the National Baseball Hall of Fame

== Managers ==
#^{[b]}	Image	Manager	Seasons	G	W	L	WPct	PA	PW	PL	LC	WS	Ref
1		John Clapp	1883	98	46	50	.479	—	—	—	—	—	
2		Jim Price	1884	100	56	42	.571	—	—	—	—	—	
3		John Montgomery Ward^{†}	1884	14	6	8	.429	—	—	—	—	—	
4		Jim Mutrie	1885–1891	905	529	345	.605	2	12	7	2	2^{[a]}	
5		Pat Powers	1892	153	71	80	.470	—	—	—	—	—	
—		John Montgomery Ward^{†}	1893–1894	275	156	108	.591	—	—	—	—	—	
6		George Davis^{†}	1895	33	16	17	.485	—	—	—	—	—	
7		Jack Doyle	1895	64	32	31	.508	—	—	—	—	—	
8		Harvey Watkins	1895	35	18	17	.514	—	—	—	—	—	
9		Arthur Irwin	1896	90	36	53	.404	—	—	—	—	—	
10		Bill Joyce	1896–1898	316	179	122	.595	—	—	—	—	—	
11		Cap Anson^{†}	1898	22	9	13	.409	—	—	—	—	—	
12		John B. Day	1899	66	29	35	.453	—	—	—	—	—	
13		Fred Hoey	1899	87	31	55	.360	—	—	—	—	—	
14		Buck Ewing^{†}	1900	63	21	41	.339	—	—	—	—	—	
—		George Davis^{†}	1900–1901	291	91	122	.427	—	—	—	—	—	
15		Horace Fogel	1902	44	18	23	.439	—	—	—	—	—	
16		Heinie Smith	1902	32	5	27	.156	—	—	—	—	—	
17		John McGraw^{†}	1902–1932	4,424	2,583	1,790	.591	9	26	28	10	3	
18		Hughie Jennings^{†} (interim)	1924, 1925	76	53	23	.697	—	—	—	—	—	
19		Rogers Hornsby^{†} (interim)	1927	33	22	10	.688	—	—	—	—	—	
20		Bill Terry^{†}	1932–1941	1,496	823	661	.555	3	7	9	3	1	
21		Mel Ott^{†}	1942–1948	1,004	464	530	.467	—	—	—	—	—	
22		Leo Durocher^{†}	1948–1955	1,163	637	523	.549	2	6	4	2	1	
23		Bill Rigney	1956–1960	674	332	342	.493	—	—	—	—	—	
24		Tom Sheehan	1960	98	46	50	.479	—	—	—	—	—	
25		Alvin Dark	1961–1964	644	366	277	.569	1	3	4	1	0	
26		Herman Franks	1965–1968	649	367	280	.567	—	—	—	—	—	
27		Clyde King	1969–1970	204	109	95	.534	—	—	—	—	—	
28		Charlie Fox	1970–1974	675	348	327	.478	1	1	3	0	0	
29		Wes Westrum	1974–1975	247	118	129	.516	—	—	—	—	—	
—		Bill Rigney	1976	162	74	88	.457	—	—	—	—	—	
30		Joe Altobelli	1977–1979	464	225	239	.485	—	—	—	—	—	
31		Dave Bristol	1979–1980	183	85	98	.464	—	—	—	—	—	
32		Frank Robinson^{†}	1981–1984	541	264	277	.488	—	—	—	—	—	
33		Danny Ozark (interim)	1984	56	24	32	.429	—	—	—	—	—	
34		Jim Davenport	1985	144	56	88	.389	—	—	—	—	—	
35		Roger Craig	1985–1992	1,152	586	566	.509	2	7	9	1	0	
36		Dusty Baker^{[c]}	1993–2002	1,556	840	715	.540	3	11	13	1	0	
37		Felipe Alou	2003–2006	646	342	304	.529	1	1	3	0	0	
38		Bruce Bochy	2007–2019	2,106	1052	1054	.500	4	36	17	3	3	
39		Gabe Kapler	2020–2023	543	295	248	.543	1	2	3	—	—	
40		Kai Correa (interim)	2023	3	1	2	.333	0	0	0	—	—	
41		Bob Melvin	2024–2025	324	161	163	.497	0	0	0	—	—	
42		Tony Vitello	2026–present	162	65	97	.401	0	0	0	—	—	

Statistics current through 2026 season.

== Managers with multiple tenures ==
#^{[a]}	Manager	Seasons	G	W	L	WPct	PA	PW	PL	LC	WS	Ref
3	John Montgomery Ward^{†}	1884, 1893–1894	291	162	116	.583	—	—	—	—	—	
6	George Davis^{†}	1895, 1900–1901	252	107	139	.435	—	—	—	—	—	
21	Bill Rigney	1956–1960, 1976	836	406	430	.486	—	—	—	—	—	

== Footnotes ==
- ^{a} Although the Giants won the tournament called the World Series twice before 1900, the 19th century World Series was a very different event from the current World Series, which began to be played in 1903. The 19th century World Series was considered an exhibition contest between the champion of the National League and the champion of the American Association.
- ^{b} #: A running total of the number of Giants' managers. Thus, any manager who has two or more separate terms is only counted once.
- ^{c} Dusty Baker won the Manager of the Year Award in 1993, 1997 and 2000.
