= Capitol Park =

Capitol Park may refer to:

Places in the United States:

- Capitol Park (Sacramento, California)
- Capitol Park (Augusta, Maine)
- Capitol Park (Tuscaloosa, Alabama) on Childress Hill where the state capitol was located
- Capitol Park Historic District, Detroit, Michigan, listed in the National Register of Historic Places
- Two defunct 19th-century baseball fields in Washington, D.C.:
  - Capitol Grounds or Capitol Park I, home of the Washington Nationals, 1884
  - Swampoodle Grounds or Capitol Park II, home of the Washington Nationals 1886–1889

Places in Croatia:

- Capitol Park (Makarska)

== See also ==
- Capital Park (disambiguation)
