= Athletic Park =

Athletic Park can refer to many places, including:

In the United States

- Athletic Grounds, Philadelphia
- Athletic Park (Buffalo), also known as Luna Park and Carnival Court
- Athletic Park (Denver)
- Athletic Park (Duluth)
- Athletic Park (Greensburg)
- Athletic Park (Indianapolis)
- Athletic Park (Kansas City)
- Athletic Park (Los Angeles)
- Athletic Park (Milwaukee)
- Athletic Park (Minneapolis)
- Athletic Park (Nashville), also known as Sulphur Dell
- Athletic Park (New Orleans)
- Athletic Park (Omaha)
- Athletic Park (Philadelphia)
- Athletic Park (St. Louis)
- Athletic Park (St. Paul)
- Athletic Park (Syracuse), also known as Star Park
- Athletic Park (Washington)
- Athletic Park (Wausau)
- Cone Athletic Park, Greensboro, North Carolina
- Durham Athletic Park, Durham, North Carolina
- Durham Bulls Athletic Park, Durham, North Carolina

In New Zealand

- Athletic Park, Wellington

In Canada

- Athletic Park (Medicine Hat)
- Athletic Park (Vancouver)
