= Ed Hengel =

American baseball player, manager, and umpire

- Manager / Umpire
- Born: September 16, 1855; Chicago, Illinois, U.S.
- Died: November 4, 1927 (aged 72); Norwich, England

MLB statistics
- Games managed: 74
- Managerial record: 34–39
- Winning percentage: .466
- Managerial record at Baseball Reference

Teams
- Chicago Browns/Pittsburgh Stogies (1884)

Edward Siegfried Hengel (September 16, 1855 – November 4, 1927) was an American professional baseball player, manager, and umpire. He is best known for managing the Chicago Browns/Pittsburgh Stogies, a team in the major league Union Association that only operated in 1884.

== Biography ==
Hengel served as a single-season manager for four different teams, three of them in the minor leagues. His minor league teams were the Quincy Quincys (Quincy, Illinois) of the Northwestern League in 1883, the Hastings Hustlers (Hastings, Nebraska) of the Western League in 1887, and the Hamilton, Ohio, team of the Tri-State League in 1889. Records for these minor league teams are incomplete. Baseball records further indicate that Hengel also appeared as a player for Hamilton in 1889, but no statistics are available.

In 1884, the only season of the Union Association, considered to have been a major league, Hengel was the first manager of the Chicago Browns/Pittsburgh Stogies. He compiled a record of 34–39 in 74 games, (Note: One game that Hengel managed ended in a tie; tie games are excluded from major league team win–loss records.) before he was replaced by Joe Battin.

Hengel also served as a major league umpire during two seasons; 11 games in the National League in 1886, and 20 games in the American Association in 1889. He ejected two players, both in 1889; Mark Baldwin and Oyster Burns. He was also reported as being an umpire in the minor Northwestern League during 1883. His umpiring was described as "uniformly good" in 1886.

Born in Chicago in 1855, Hengel died at age 72 in 1927 in Norwich, England. A brother, Moxie Hengel, was a major league second baseman.
