= Moxie Hengel =

American baseball player (1857–1924)

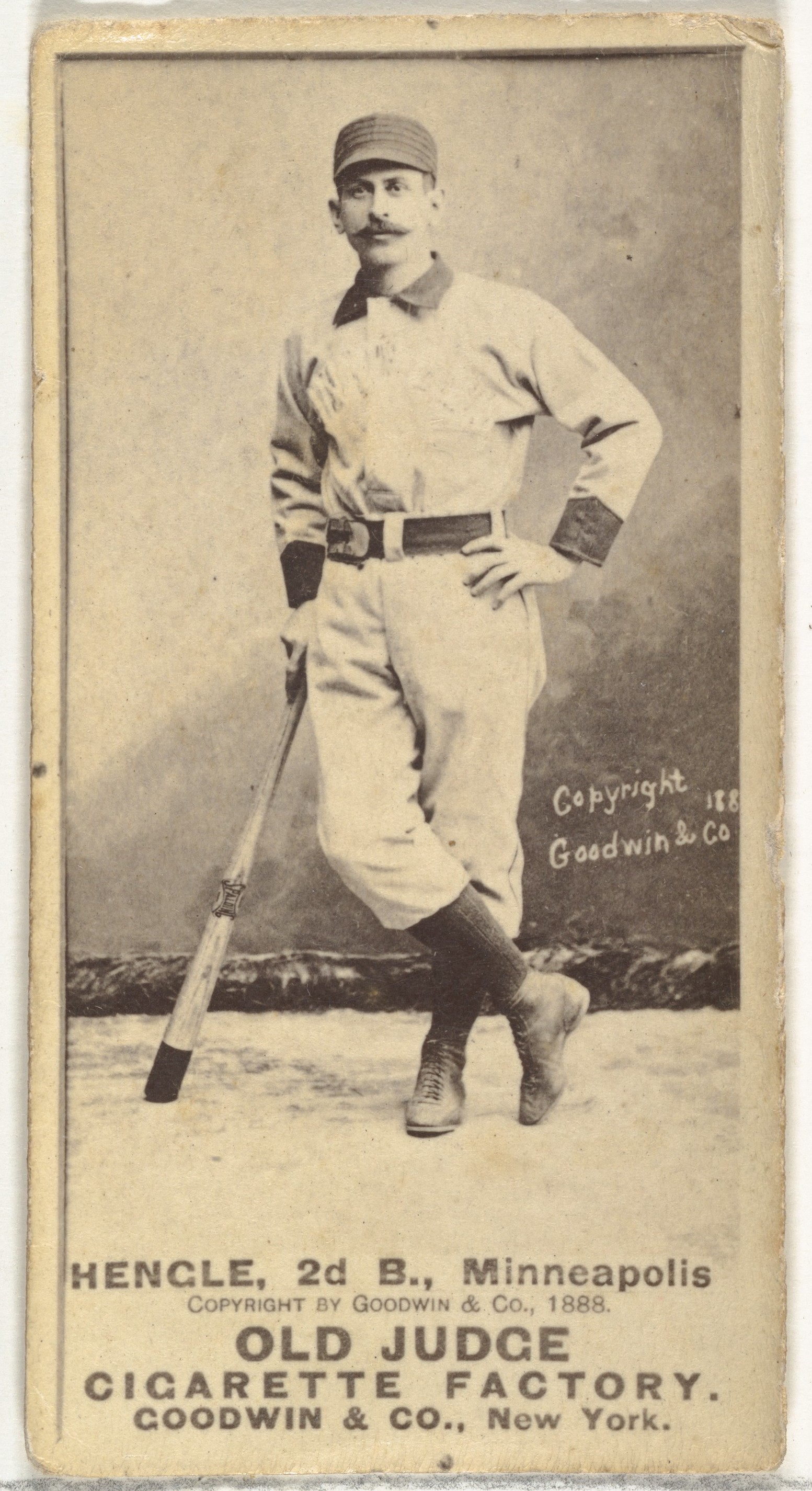
- Second baseman
- Born: October 7, 1857; Chicago, Illinois, U.S.
- Died: December 11, 1924 (aged 67); River Forest, Illinois, U.S.
- Batted: Right Threw: Unknown

MLB debut
- April 20, 1884, for the Chicago Browns

Last MLB appearance
- May 27, 1885, for the Buffalo Bisons

MLB statistics
- At bats: 133
- Home Runs: 0
- Batting average: .180
- Stats at Baseball Reference

Teams
- Chicago Browns (1884); St. Paul White Caps (1884); Buffalo Bisons (1885)

Emery J. Hengel (October 7, 1857 – December 11, 1924) was an American Major League Baseball second baseman. A native of Chicago, Illinois, he played for the Chicago Browns (1884) and the St. Paul Saints (1884), both of the Union Association, and for the National League Buffalo Bisons (1885).

Hengel was an average fielder and a poor hitter during his short major league career. In 35 total games he was just 24-for-133 (.180) with thirteen runs scored. Two of his famous teammates on the Buffalo Bisons were Hall of Famers Dan Brouthers and Pud Galvin.

Hengle died in River Forest, Illinois, at the age of 67. A brother, Ed Hengel, was a major league manager and umpire.
