= John Bickerton (baseball) =

American baseball manager

John A. Bickerton was a Major League Baseball manager. He managed the final game of the season for the Washington Nationals, also known as the Washington Statesmen, of the American Association on August 2, 1884, replacing Holly Hollingshead The Nationals lost the game to the New York Metropolitans by a score of 6–5. That game proved to the final game in the franchise's history, as the franchise folded after the season after losing 51 of their 63 games.

Bickerton was born in Washington, D.C., in about 1848. He died in Washington, D.C., in 1916.
