= Capital Park =

Capital Park may refer to:

- National Capital Parks, an official unit of the National Park System of the United States
  - National Capital Parks-East, an administrative grouping of several of the parks in the Washington, D.C. area
- Capital Park, Pretoria, a suburb of Pretoria, Gauteng Province, South Africa

== See also ==
- Capitol Park (disambiguation)
