= Barclay, Baltimore =

Barclay
- Neighborhood
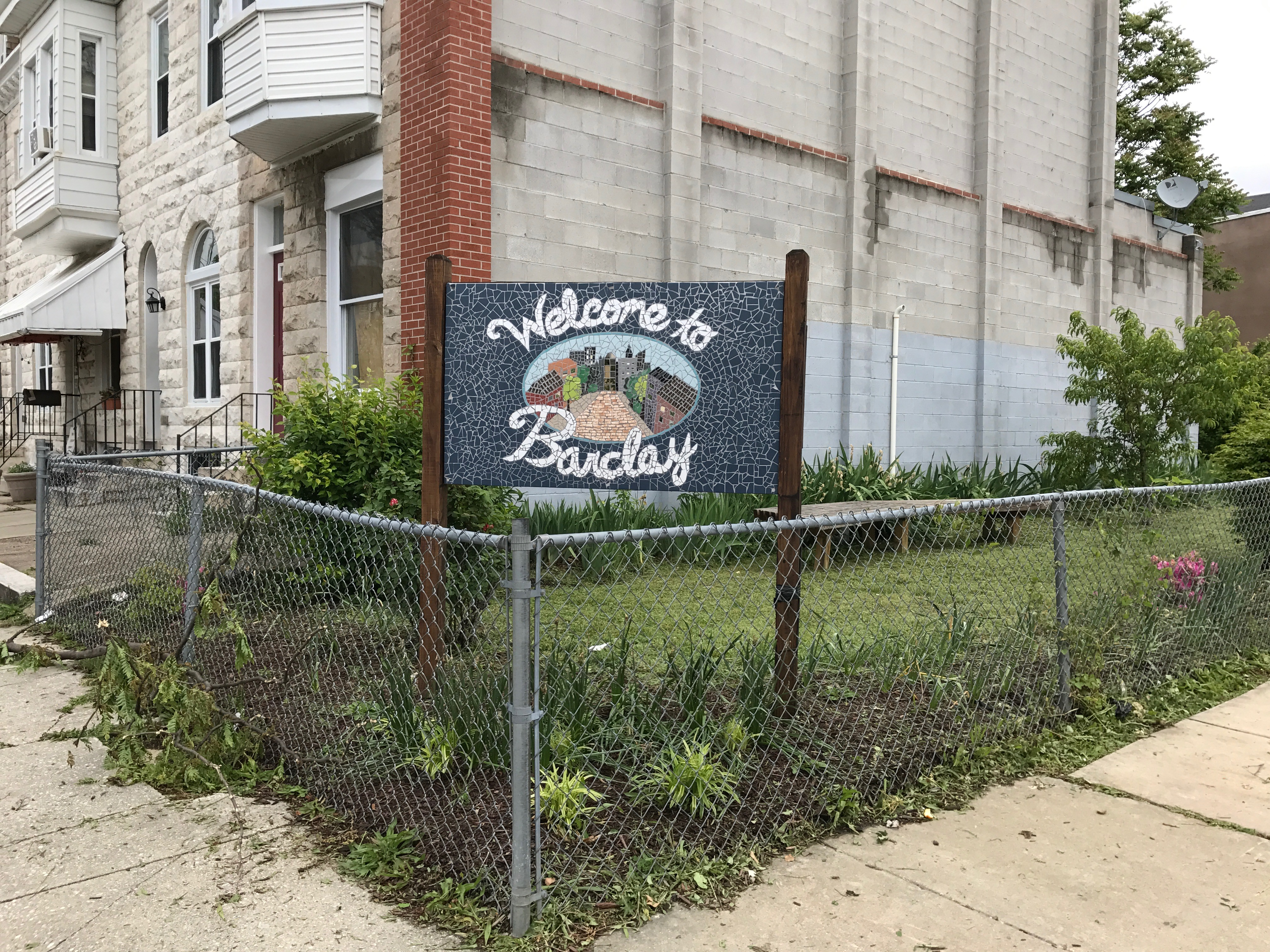
- Barclay neighborhood welcome sign

- Location within Baltimore
- Coordinates: 39°18′54″N 76°36′42″W
- Country: United States
- State: Maryland
- City: Baltimore

Area
  - Total: .138 sq mi (0.36 km^{2})
  - Land: .138 sq mi (0.36 km^{2})

Population (2020)
  - Total: 4,323
- Time zone: UTC-5 (Eastern)
  - Summer (DST): EDT
- ZIP code: 21218
- Area code: 410, 443, and 667

Barclay is a neighborhood in the center of Baltimore City. Its boundaries, as defined by the City Planning Office, are marked by North Avenue, Greenmount Avenue, Saint Paul and 25th Streets. The neighborhood lies north of Greenmount West, south of Charles Village, west of East Baltimore Midway, and east of Charles North and Old Goucher. The boundary between the Northern and Eastern police districts runs through the community, cutting it roughly in half.

== History ==
Although the neighborhood's history reaches into the eighteenth century, most of the current historic buildings date between 1870 and 1917. During this period, the neighborhood matured into an urban, elegant rowhouse neighborhood. Influencing the architectural design of the neighborhood was the building of Lovely Lane Methodist Church and Old Goucher College. In 1883, Stanford White designed Lovely Lane Methodist Church. Between 1885 and 1897 Goucher College, then known as Baltimore's Women College, had built twenty-two buildings. By 1910 Barclay and the surrounding neighborhoods were completely developed, and these buildings weave together a design sensibility still felt throughout the neighborhood.

The neighborhood thrived until the Great Depression. In the early 1940s the neighborhood began to accommodate a large influx of war-time workers, and many of the houses were divided into apartments. Goucher College moved its campus to Towson in 1952; the suburban rush was on. After the 1968 riots, many businesses and homeowners moved to the suburbs. Consequently, the neighborhood began to become less desirable. During the mid-1990s, some demolition occurred within the area. Today, however, there is a revival of urban living that has captured the attention of Baltimore.

== Neighborhood & Community Organizations ==
Barclay has benefitted from the work of several neighborhood-focused organizations that engage in community building and planning. Some of the active organizations are listed below:

- Barclay-Midway & Old Goucher Coalition
- Greater Greenmount Community Association
- People's Homesteading Group
- Station North Arts and Entertainment District

== Education ==
There are a number of schools accessible to residents of the Barclay community including:

- Baltimore Lab School
- Gateway School
- Dallas F. Nichols Sr. Elementary School
- Mother Seton Academy
- Cecil Elementary School
- Margaret Brent Elementary
- Barclay Elementary/Middle School
- Baltimore Montessori Public Charter School

== Barclay Today ==
The community boasts Victorian-era townhomes, tree-lined streets and beautiful architectural details. Though the area's houses were clearly built for the middle-class, the neighborhood went through a period of economic decline, housing abandonment, crime and gang problems. The neighborhood has seen significant investment and development since 2005, when well-organized residents created a community development vision plan that has served as a catalyst for Barclay's resurgence. Telesis Corporation was selected by the Housing Authority of Baltimore City (“HABC”) and the Barclay/ Midway/ Old Goucher (“BMOG”) community to serve as the developer for a large-scale, multi-phased $85 million revitalization effort in the BMOG neighborhood.

To improve the housing stock and combat blight, a participatory planning process involving key community stakeholders led to the creation of the Barclay/ Midway/ Old Goucher Redevelopment Plan. The redevelopment strategy focuses on mending the fabric of the neighborhood through the scattered-site infill development of 268 scattered-site parcels, including 94 vacant lots, into approximately 320 units of mixed-income and mixed-tenure housing, with both rental and homeownership opportunities. A central component to this neighborhood revitalization effort includes strengthening the socio-economic base of the community, while encouraging sustainable building practices. In 2006, a green design charrette held by community residents and developers resulted in the creation of the BMOG Green Building Guidelines, which incorporate LEED, USGBC and Enterprise Green building principles. As a result, many of the recently developed townhouses and apartment buildings have achieved certification for sustainable development. Barclay is also one of the focus neighborhoods in Central Baltimore Partnership's Explore the Core campaign.

== See also ==
- List of Baltimore neighborhoods
