= Madison Avenue Grounds =

Defunct baseball grounds

Coordinates: 39.309804°N 76.633287°W

Madison Avenue Grounds (later known as Monumental Park) was a baseball ground located in Baltimore, Maryland. It was built by the Waverly Club as the first enclosed ballpark in Baltimore, with spectator seating and player clubhouses, and was the site of the first intercity game played in Baltimore (Brooklyn Excelsiors 51, Baltimore Excelsiors 6) on September 22, 1860; it was the site of a 47-7 defeat of the local Marylands by the undefeated Cincinnati Red Stockings in 1869, and it was used by the Washington Olympics for a professional game in 1871. On August 16, 1870, it was the site of an intercity game between black teams. It would continue to be used for games staged by black teams, in a time before there were any organized Negro leagues.

The ballpark was home to the Maryland club of the National Association, who had a brief fling as a professional club in 1873. Retrosheet differs from Michael Benson's Baseball Parks of North America, in that Benson states the Maryland club lasted until July 11 at the ballpark. Retrosheet indicates that only one game was played there and that the July 11 game was at Newington Park, the home of the relatively established Lord Baltimore club. The Maryland club, in fact, played only six games as professionals: the first two against Washington, and the last four against their intra-city rivals.

A short-lived Baltimore entry in the Eastern League in 1884 played their games at what by then was known as Monumental Park.

The park was also the home to Baltimore's Union Association entry in 1884, again for only one game as the club owners decided the grounds were unfit for use. Although Retrosheet indicates all home games were at the club's Belair Lot field, there was, in fact, one Union Association game at the grounds. The Baltimore Sun for August 25, 1884, reported that the Unions were shifting to "Monumental Park, at Madison and Boundary Avenues", because "Union Park, Belair Lot, was deemed rather too small." However, in the game report in the paper the next day, it said that "the ground was found to be uneven, and the Union clubs will play no more there, going back to Union Park, Belair Lot" for their remaining home games.

James H. Bready, in his book The Home Team, a history of the Baltimore baseball clubs, places the location (based on old maps) on a block roughly bounded by what is now Madison Avenue (southwest); Boundary Avenue (later North Avenue) (north); Linden Avenue (northeast); and an old, unnamed road (southeast). The location has also been given as "the end of Eutaw Street near the corner of Madison Avenue and North Avenue." Eutaw cuts through what was once the ballpark property and, coincidentally, passes by the right field side of Oriole Park at Camden Yards a couple of miles to the south.
