= Jim Price (baseball manager) =

American baseball manager

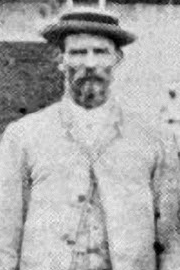
- Manager
- Born: August 20, 1847; New York City, U.S.
- Died: October 24, 1925 (aged 78); Oak Park, Illinois, U.S.
- Batted: Unknown Threw: Unknown

MLB statistics
- Games managed: 100
- Managerial record: 56-42
- Winning percentage: .571

Teams
- New York Gothams (1884)

James Lyman Price (September 20, 1847 – October 24, 1925) was an American manager in Major League Baseball. In the 1884 season, with the New York Gothams he was the club's manager. During his lone season as manager, he led the Gothams to 56 wins, with 42 losses in 100 games. He died in Oak Park, Illinois in 1925.

== See also ==
- San Francisco Giants general managers and managers
