= Union Grounds (St. Louis) =

Former baseball grounds in St. Louis, Missouri

- Union Base Ball Park, Lucas Park
- Interactive map of Union Grounds
- Location: St. Louis, Missouri
- Coordinates: 38°38′47″N 90°12′44″W
- Capacity: 10,000
- Surface: grass

Tenant
- St. Louis Maroons (UA / NL) (1884 / 1885–1886)

Union Grounds, also known as Union Base Ball Park, was a baseball grounds in St. Louis, Missouri. It was home to the St. Louis Maroons of the Union Association during the 1884 season and the Maroons entry in the National League in 1885 and 1886.

Both the Union Association and the St. Louis Maroons were the brainchild of Henry Lucas, and local newspapers often called the venue "the Lucas Park" or just "Lucas Park". Even after the Maroons joined the National League, local papers continued to call the venue "Union Park" most of the time.

The ballpark was bounded by Jefferson Avenue (west, first base); Howard Street (north, third base); 25th Street (east, left field); and Cass Avenue (south, right field). Mullanphy Street was later cut through what was once right and center fields.

After the Maroons moved to Indianapolis, Union Park continued to be used for local amateur baseball and other sports, during 1887 and part of 1888. In August 1888, the ballpark's stands were demolished and the land was eventually sold to developers.

Beginning in 2019, the ballpark site and several adjacent city blocks were cleared off to make room for a National Geospatial-Intelligence Agency facility.
