= Pittsburgh Stogies =

The Pittsburgh Stogies was the name of three historic professional baseball teams representing Pittsburgh, Pennsylvania.

- Chicago Browns/Pittsburgh Stogies (1884), a major league baseball team that played in the Union Association
- Pittsburgh Rebels (1913–1915), a baseball team in the Federal League that played as the Pittsburgh Stogies in 1913 and 1914
