= Jimmy Williams (baseball manager) =

American baseball manager

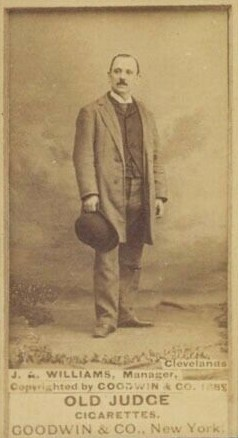
- 1888 baseball card of Williams
- Manager
- Born: January 4, 1847; Catawba, Ohio, U.S.
- Died: October 23, 1918 (aged 71); Westbury, New York, U.S.

MLB debut
- May 1, 1884, for the St. Louis Browns

Last MLB appearance
- July 15, 1887, for the Cleveland Blues

MLB statistics
- Games managed: 282
- Win–loss record: 110–169
- Winning %: .394

Teams
- St. Louis Browns (1884); Cleveland Blues (1887–1888)

James Andrew Williams (January 4, 1847 – October 23, 1918) was an American manager in Major League Baseball for three seasons. He managed the St. Louis Browns in 1884, and the Cleveland Blues in 1887 and 1888. He had a career win–loss record of 110–169 in 282 games managed.

Williams died in Westbury, New York, at the age of 71, and is interred Green Lawn Cemetery in Columbus, Ohio.
