= Columbia Park (Altoona) =

Baseball field in Altoona, Pennsylvania, US

- Interactive map of Columbia Park
- Location: Altoona, Pennsylvania
- Coordinates: 40°29′36″N 78°24′36″W
- Surface: Grass

Construction
- Opened: 1884

Tenant
- Altoona Mountain Citys (1884) (UA)

Columbia Park was a baseball field in Altoona, Pennsylvania, which was the home field for the Altoona Mountain Citys of the Union Association (UA) during the league's only season in 1884.

The longest UA game by innings played was played on May 27, 1884, in Columbia Park, with the Mountain Citys beating the Baltimore Monumentals by a score of 3–2 in 13 innings.

The ballpark, which was also sometimes called Fourth Avenue Grounds, was located at Lower Sixth Street, Fourth Avenue, and Mill Run Road.
