= Belair Lot =

Former baseball ground in Baltimore, Maryland

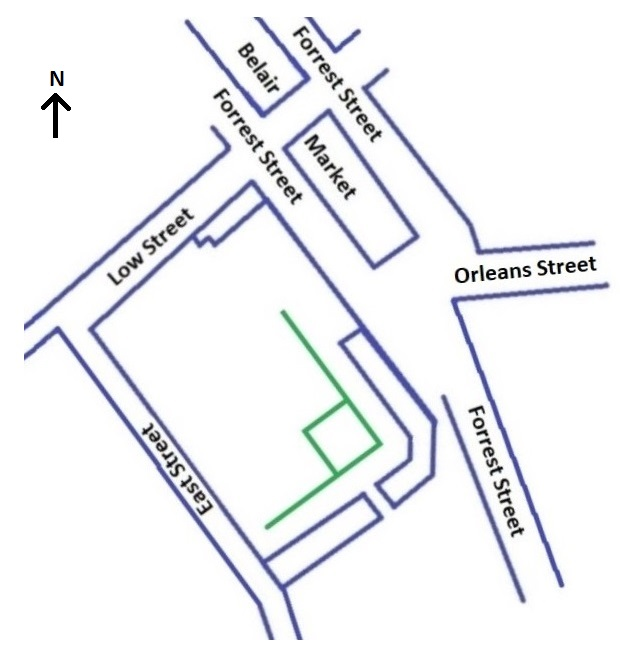
- Approximation of Belair Lot layout based on a contemporary map
- Interactive map of Belair Lot
- Location: Baltimore, Maryland
- Coordinates: 39°17′41.5″N 76°36′12.6″W
- Surface: grass

Tenant
- Baltimore Monumentals (UA) (1884)

Belair Lot is a former baseball ground located in Baltimore, Maryland. The ground was home to the Baltimore Unions of the Union Association in 1884, with the exception of one game at the Madison Avenue Grounds. The ballpark was also called Union Park or Union Association Grounds (not to be confused with the later and better known Union Park).

On July 4, 1884, Baltimore played a split double header against the Cincinnati Outlaw Reds and the run-away league leaders, the St. Louis Maroons, which saw a sellout crowd in attendance. The field also hosted a home game (a makeup of an earlier postponement) for the traveling Chicago Browns on September 17, who played against the Maroons while in the midst of a road series against Baltimore.

Sources conflict as to some of the details of the ballpark's location. Both agree that it was across Forrest Street from the Belair Market, and that another of its boundaries was Low Street.

- According to The Home Team, by James H. Bready, the ballpark was on a block bounded by Forrest Street (northeast); Low Street (southeast); Orleans Street (south); and Gay Street (northwest). However, all contemporary maps show Orleans stopping at Forrest rather than continuing westward.
- A contemporary detailed map which includes the layout of the field has it this way: Forrest Street (northeast, first base); Low Street (northwest, right field); Orleans Street's end at that time (east, infield area); East Street (southwest, left field); buildings and Douglas Street (roughly corresponding to Lexington Street) (southeast, third base).

Either way, the road configuration in this area has changed over time, but the boundaries of the blocks are still discernible in modern maps. No photograph of the park itself is known to exist.

The park site is now occupied by commercial buildings and vacant lots. The site of the old Belair Market is now a large grassy median separating traffic lanes on Forrest Street.
