= Bank Street Grounds =

Former baseball park located in Cincinnati

Coordinates: 39°07′13″N 84°32′17″W

The Bank Street Grounds was a baseball park located in Cincinnati. The park was home to three major league baseball teams. The National League Cincinnati Stars club in 1880, the current Cincinnati Reds franchise from 1882 to 1883 and the Cincinnati Outlaw Reds of the Union Association in 1884. It succeeded the Avenue Grounds as the home site for professional ball in the Queen City.

== National League ==
A new National League entry, the Cincinnati Stars, formed for the 1880 season, but the new franchise was short-lived. The club was expelled from the league for selling beer and renting out its ballpark on Sundays, violating its self-instituted "blue law", the club was disbanded.

== American Association ==
A new Reds franchise was formed as an American Association club in 1882. This club is the same Reds team that exists today. The AA had no such rules against Sunday play or beer sales. Indeed, the American Association was known informally as "the beer and whiskey league".

According to Lee Allen, Cincinnati writer and eventual director of the Baseball Hall of Fame, the Worcester club had been especially instrumental in having the Reds expelled after 1880. In his 1948 book, The Cincinnati Reds, Allen took some satisfaction in pointing out that when the Reds re-formed in 1882, it was the same year that Worcester's days as a major league franchise, as well as its influence, came to an end.

The Reds won the inaugural season of the AA, and as such participated in a World Series, of sorts, with the NL champions, the Chicago White Stockings. The exhibition Series was informally arranged, and ended after two games with each team having won one. Both games were staged at the Bank Street Grounds, or "Bank-Street Grounds" as the local papers stylized it.

== Union Association ==
In 1884, a former prominent member of the Reds front-office, a man named Justus Thorner, invested in the new Union Association club. He secured the Bank Street Grounds for his team, and the Reds had to look elsewhere. The Reds eventually settled on a site three blocks south, an asymmetrical lot bounded by McLean, York, Findlay and Western, opening the site that would eventually become Crosley Field, the home of the Reds until partway into the 1970 season.

During the 1884 season, the ballpark was dubbed Union Athletic Park in the local newspapers.

Although the Union Association was dominated by the St. Louis Maroons, the Cincinnati Unions or "Outlaw Reds" had a strong club that could hold its own against the Maroons, and drew well at the gate, eroding the "real" Reds' fan base. However, the "Onion League" folded after just one season.

== Back to the National League ==
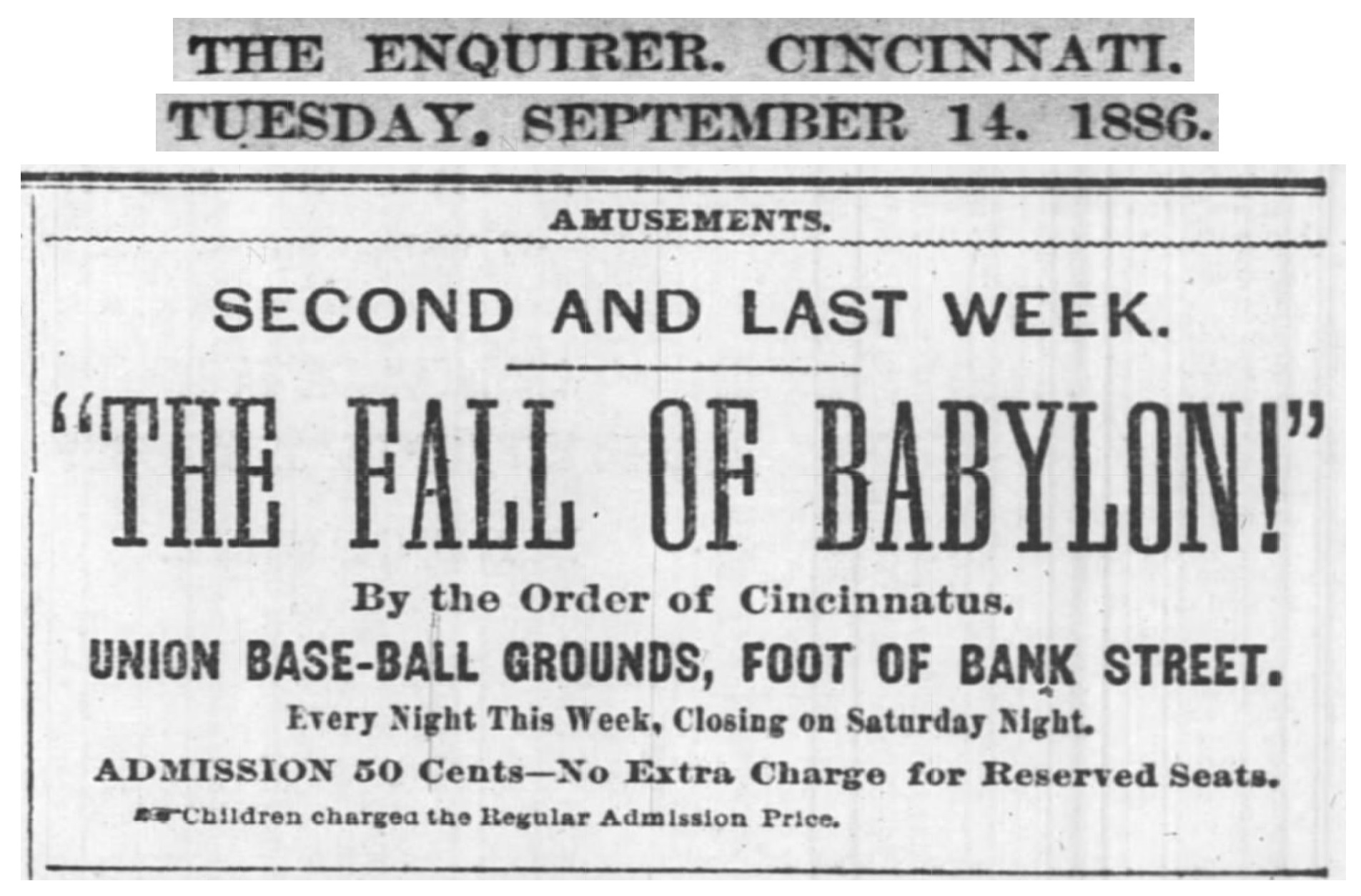
Newspaper ad for a play being staged at the former Bank Street ballpark

The Reds moved from the American Association to the National League for the 1890 season. A year later, some legal issues arose over the sale of the club to a new owner, and the rights to Cincinnati Park (as the ancestor to Crosley Field was then known) were part of that litigation. To hedge their bets, the new owners turned their attention to the Bank Street Grounds property and secured a lease on the lot. Once the legal issues were settled, the Reds opted to stay at Findlay and Western.

In the fall of 1893, the Reds had decided to build a new grandstand. On December 5, the Enquirer reported that the Reds had designed a new "League Park" to be built on the old Bank Street site. The Enquirer for December 19 had an architect's drawing of the new design, and reported that whether to build it at Findlay and Western or at Bank Street would be decided very soon. Ultimately the Reds again decided to stick with Findlay and Western, and Bank Street was done with professional baseball.

During the summers of 1886 through 1891, the property was used by the local chapter of the Order of Cincinnatus, who staged plays there.

== Location ==
Bank Street vacant lot and Reds ballpark, 1900 artist's conception

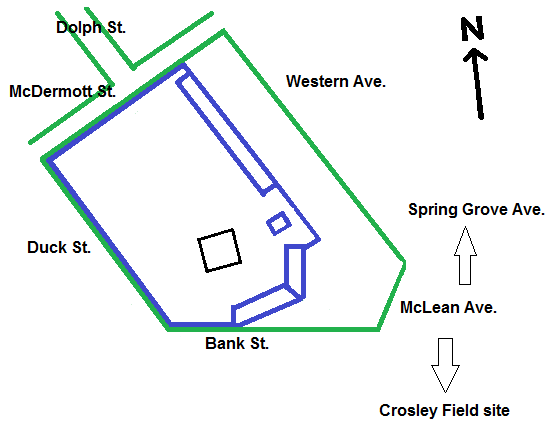
Approximation of Bank Street Grounds layout

The ballpark was located northwest of the intersection of Bank Street and McLean Avenue, just three blocks north on McLean from the future site of Crosley Field. Its location has typically been described as "the foot of Bank Street." Contemporary maps which include a rough diagram of the ballpark clarify its location and orientation: Bank Street (south, third base); houses and McLean Avenue transitioning to Spring Grove Avenue (southeast, home plate); Duck Street (southwest, left and center fields); McDermott Street (northwest, center and right fields); houses and Western Avenue (northeast, first base). Once the park was abandoned, Dolph Street was run through the property to extend to Bank, paralleling Western.

Many of the streets in that part of the city have since been renamed, rerouted, or eliminated. The original location can be inferred from the remaining streets. In current terms, the site is northwest of the point where Bank Street turns from an east-west street to a north-south street (the former McLean Avenue). The ballpark site is now occupied by a parking lot for the Southwest Ohio Regional Transit Authority ("SORTA") and CSX Transportation.

Preceded by None	Home of the Cincinnati Stars; 1880	Succeeded by Cincinnati Reds
Preceded by Cincinnati Stars	Home of the Cincinnati Reds; 1881 - 1883	Succeeded by Cincinnati Outlaw Reds
