= League Park (Toledo) =

Baseball ground in Toledo, Ohio, US

- Interactive map of League Park
- Location: Toledo, Ohio
- Coordinates: 41°39′13″N 83°32′44″W
- Surface: grass

Tenant
- Toledo Blue Stockings (AA) (1884)

League Park is a former baseball ground located in Toledo, Ohio, US. The ground was home to the Toledo Blue Stockings baseball club of the then-major American Association from May 14, 1884, to September 23, 1884. The club also played minor league games here in 1883 and 1885.

The ballpark was located on a block bounded by Monroe Street (southwest), 15th Street (northwest), Jefferson Avenue (northeast), and 13th Street (southeast), a few blocks northwest of the site of the current Fifth Third Field.

This was the home field in 1884 for Moses Fleetwood Walker, the best-known of the black American major league ballplayers in the 19th century prior to the color line being drawn.

== See also ==
- List of baseball parks in Toledo, Ohio

== Sources ==
- The Toledo Baseball Guide of the Mud Hens 1883-1943, Ralph Elliott Lin Weber, 1944.
- Ballparks of North America, Michael Benson, McFarland, 1989.
