= Keystone Park =

Former baseball ground in Philadelphia

- Interactive map of Keystone Park
- Location: Philadelphia, Pennsylvania
- Coordinates: 39°55′43″N 75°10′10″W
- Surface: grass

Tenant
- Philadelphia Keystones (UA) (1884)

Keystone Park is a former baseball ground located in Philadelphia, Pennsylvania. The ground was home to the Philadelphia Keystones of the Union Association in 1884.

Some sources state the location of the ballpark as the east side of South Broad Street and Moore Street. However, the Philadelphia Times for March 23, 1884, p. 7, puts the ballpark on the west side of Broad Street: "... the square of ground from Broad to Fifteenth and Moore to Mifflin... four hundred feet square... two entrances located at the southwest corner of Broad and Moore streets... The grandstand is located on the northwest corner of the lot [i.e. Moore and 15th]."

The field was the original grounds of the Forepaugh Circus. Not to be confused with the later Forepaugh Park.
