= Metropolitan Park (Manhattan) =

Baseball ground in New York City

Coordinates: 40.7907°N 73.9380°W

Metropolitan Park is a former baseball ground located in East Harlem, Manhattan, in New York City. The ground was the part-time home to the New York Metropolitans of the American Association in 1884.

The wooden ballpark was built a few blocks east and south from their first home, the original Polo Grounds, on a piece of land bounded by 109th Street (north), the Harlem River (east), 107th Street (south), and First Avenue (west). It was built a block east and north of the site of the Red House hotel and grounds, which had hosted trotting, cricket and baseball from 1833 until its demise in about 1867.

The park had been built on a former dumping ground, a fact which contributed to its quick demise. It also suffered from the various swamp-related unpleasantries, such as mosquitoes, which had led to the shutdown of the Red House grounds.

The Mets played their first game at Metropolitan Park on May 13, 1884, amid a degree of publicity. However, the park proved unsatisfactory, and was soon labeled "The Dump" by players and other observers (especially sports reporters working for the Brooklyn Eagle). The Mets returned to the Polo Grounds for games starting on July 17, 1884, except when the New York Giants were playing at home. The final Mets game played at Metropolitan Park was on August 23, 1884. The Mets then returned to their original Polo Grounds venue, in time to win the American Association pennant.

The park had a capacity of about 5,000.

The park continued to be used for occasional amateur baseball and football for a year or two after the Mets abandoned it. The block is now occupied by 1199 Plaza, a complex of residential buildings.
