= Athletic Park (Kansas City) =

Baseball park in Kansas City, Missouri, US

- Interactive map of Athletic Park
- Location: Kansas City, Missouri
- Coordinates: 39°05′06″N 94°35′38″W
- Capacity: 4,000
- Surface: grass

Tenant
- Kansas City Cowboys (UA) (1884)

Athletic Park was a baseball park in Kansas City, Missouri. It was the home field for the Kansas City Cowboys/Unions of the UA in the last part of the 1884 season, after transferring from Altoona, PA.

The ballpark was located in the vicinity of Southwest Boulevard and Summit Street. The site today is occupied by various commercial businesses.
