= Swampoodle Grounds =

Former baseball park in Washington, D.C.

Coordinates: 38.8973°N 77.0075°W

- Capitol Park II
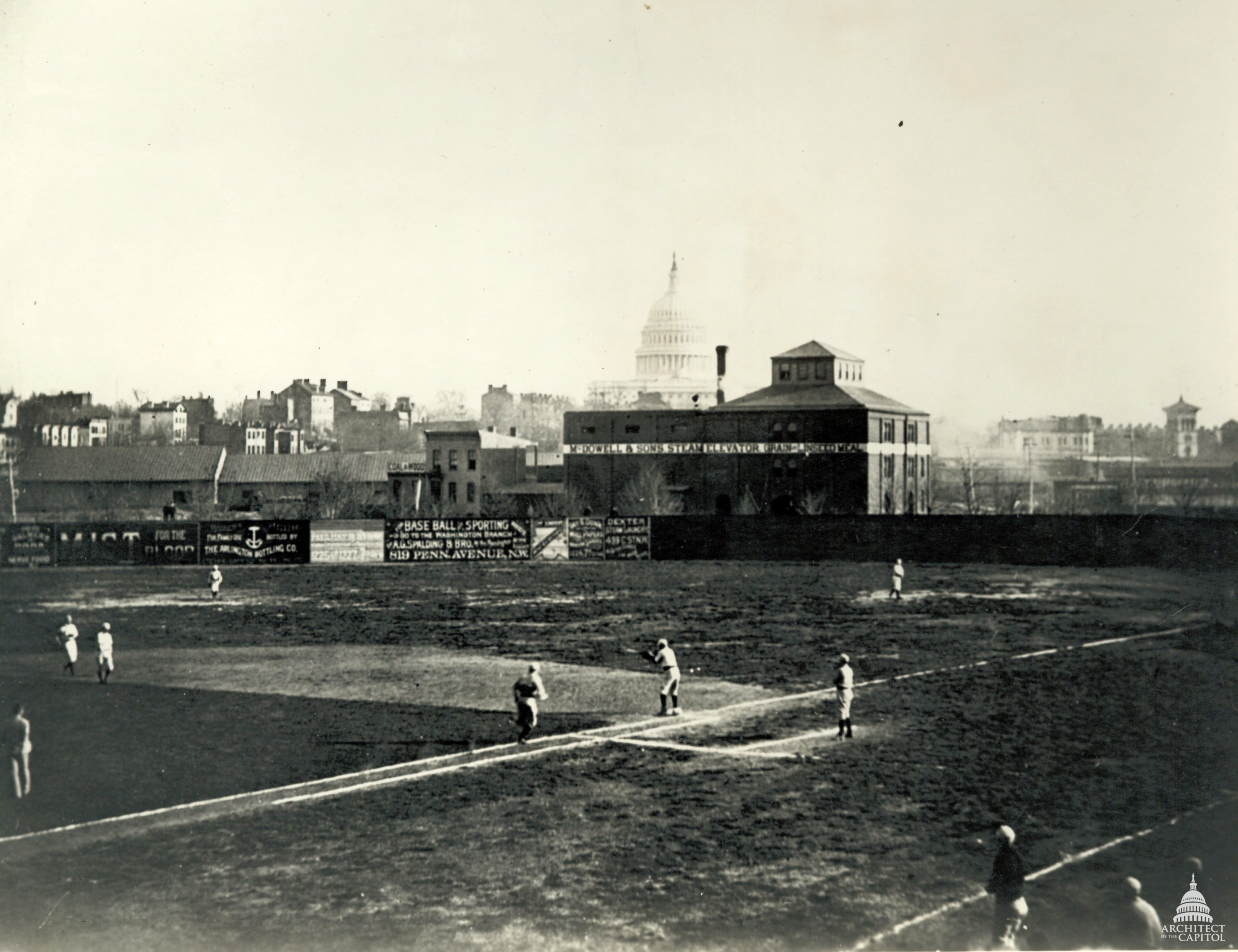
- Swampoodle Grounds, with the United States Capitol building visible in background
- Interactive map of Swampoodle Grounds
- Location: Washington, D.C.
- Capacity: 6,000
- Surface: Grass

Construction
- Opened: 1886

Tenant
- Washington Nationals (NL) (1886–1889)

Swampoodle Grounds aka Capitol Park (II) was the home of the Washington Nationals baseball team of the National League from 1886 to 1889. The name refers to the one-time Swampoodle neighborhood of Washington.

The ballfield was located on a block bounded by North Capitol Street NE and tracks (west); F Street NE (south); Delaware Avenue NE (east); and G Street NE (north); a few blocks north of the Capitol building. Spectators faced toward the south and could see the Capitol dome. They could also see the McDowell and Sons Feed Mill, visible behind center field in the picture, and which was across F Street to the south.

The club had moved a few blocks north, from Capitol Park (I) to the Swampoodle location, upon joining the National League. Local papers reported that the new grounds had more space and a more favorable lease. The papers often referred to the new grounds as Capitol Park, even as the previous Capitol Park was still in use, under the same name, for various types of entertainment. When referencing the previous park, the reports would general specify its location, to minimize possible confusion.

As construction neared completion, a local newspaper reported that the left field line was 253 ft (77 m) long and the right field was 264 ft (80 m) long.[Sunday Herald, March 28, 1886, p.3]

Portions of the site were eventually annexed as the site of the Union Station and of the Main Post Office, which is now the National Postal Museum.

Swampoodle Grounds held 6,000. The Washington Statesmen folded after the end of the 1889 season.
