= Athletic Park (Washington) =

Former baseball ground in Washington, D.C.

Coordinates: 38°54′53.2″N 77°1′27.7″W

Athletic Park is a former baseball ground located in Washington, D.C. The ground was home to the Washington Nationals a.k.a. "Statesmen", of the American Association in 1884.

The ballfield was located at S Street NW (south); 9th Street NW (east); T Street NW (north); and 10th Street NW (west); about a quarter mile southwest of the eventual site of Griffith Stadium. The club folded before the 1884 season ended.

The ballpark was first mentioned by the name Washington Athletic Park in local newspapers in 1883, as the home of the independent Nationals ball club. After the AA version of the Nationals folded, the ballpark continued to appear in local papers as a site for a variety of public events as late as 1888. By 1889 the block was being cut into lots for new housing. The site is now occupied by residences and education-related buildings.
