= Washington Nationals (American Association) =

The Washington Nationals of 1884 were a short-lived baseball team in the American Association. They won 12 games and lost 51. Their home games were played at Athletic Park in Washington, D.C. They were also known as the Washington Statesmen.

The Nationals were managed for all but one game by former player Holly Hollingshead. John Bickerton managed their final game on August 2, 1884, a loss to the New York Metropolitans. Their top hitter was shortstop Frank Fennelly, who went 75-for-257, a batting average of .292. By far their best pitcher was Bob Barr, who was 9–23 with an ERA of 3.46.

This team should not be confused with the other 1884 Washington Nationals franchise, a different team which played in the Union Association during its only year of operation.

In 1891, the AA had another team in Washington, which moved to the National League in 1892.

== See also ==
- 1884 Washington Nationals season
