= Capitol Grounds =

Baseball field in Washington, D.C.

Coordinates: 38°53′34″N 77°00′25″W

- Interactive map of Capitol Grounds
- Location: Washington, D.C.
- Capacity: 6,000
- Surface: Grass

Construction
- Opened: 1884

Tenant
- Washington Nationals (UA) (1884)

The Capitol Grounds a.k.a. Capitol Park (I), was a baseball field in Washington, D.C. The grounds were the home field for the Washington Nationals of the Union Association during the league's only season in 1884. The ballpark had a seating capacity of 6,000, and was where the Russell Senate Office Building stands today.

Most modern sources say that the ball field was bounded by C Street NE (north); Delaware Avenue NE (west): B Street (now Constitution Avenue) NE (south); and First Street NE (east); just northeast of the Capitol building.

Contemporary newspaper advertisements (see below) give the location as "New Jersey Avenue and C Street", which would put the small ballpark slightly northwest of the Capitol rather than northeast. Local papers also give the location as "adjoining the Baltimore and Ohio depot", which old maps place on the block bounded by North Capitol, New Jersey Avenue NW, C Street NW and D Street NW (see external link).

The ball club was able to finish its season despite a mediocre record, but the Union Association folded after the season ended. The club joined the minor Eastern League for the 1885 season. The club regrouped as a new entry to the National League in 1886, and moved a few blocks north to the larger Capitol Park (II).

1884 ball game ad
