= American Association (1882–1891) =

Baseball major league (1882–1891)

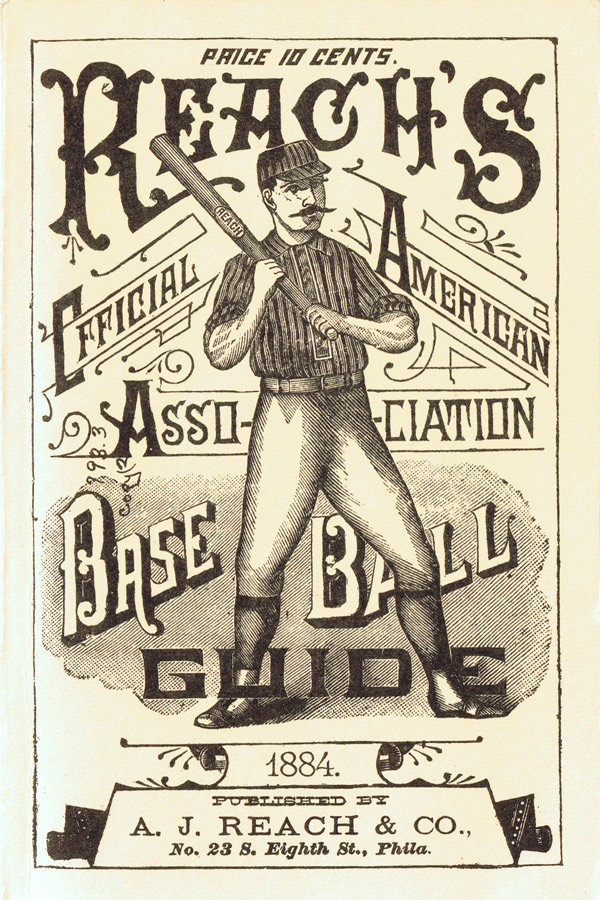
- Reach's 1884 American Association guide
- Sport: Baseball
- Founded: November 2, 1881, in Cincinnati, Ohio
- Founder: Billy Barnie; O.P. Caylor; Horace Phillips; Alfred Spink; Justus Thorner
- First season: 1882
- Folded: 1891
- Country: United States
- Most titles: St. Louis Browns (4)

The American Association of Base Ball Clubs, known simply as the American Association (AA), was a professional baseball major league that operated from 1882 to 1891. Together with its main competitor, the National League (NL), the AA participated in an early version of the World Series. When the AA folded after the 1891 season, several AA franchises joined the NL.

During its existence, the AA was often simply referred to as "the Association" in the media, in contrast to the NL, which was sometimes called "the League". It was also sometimes called the "Beer and Whiskey League".

== History ==
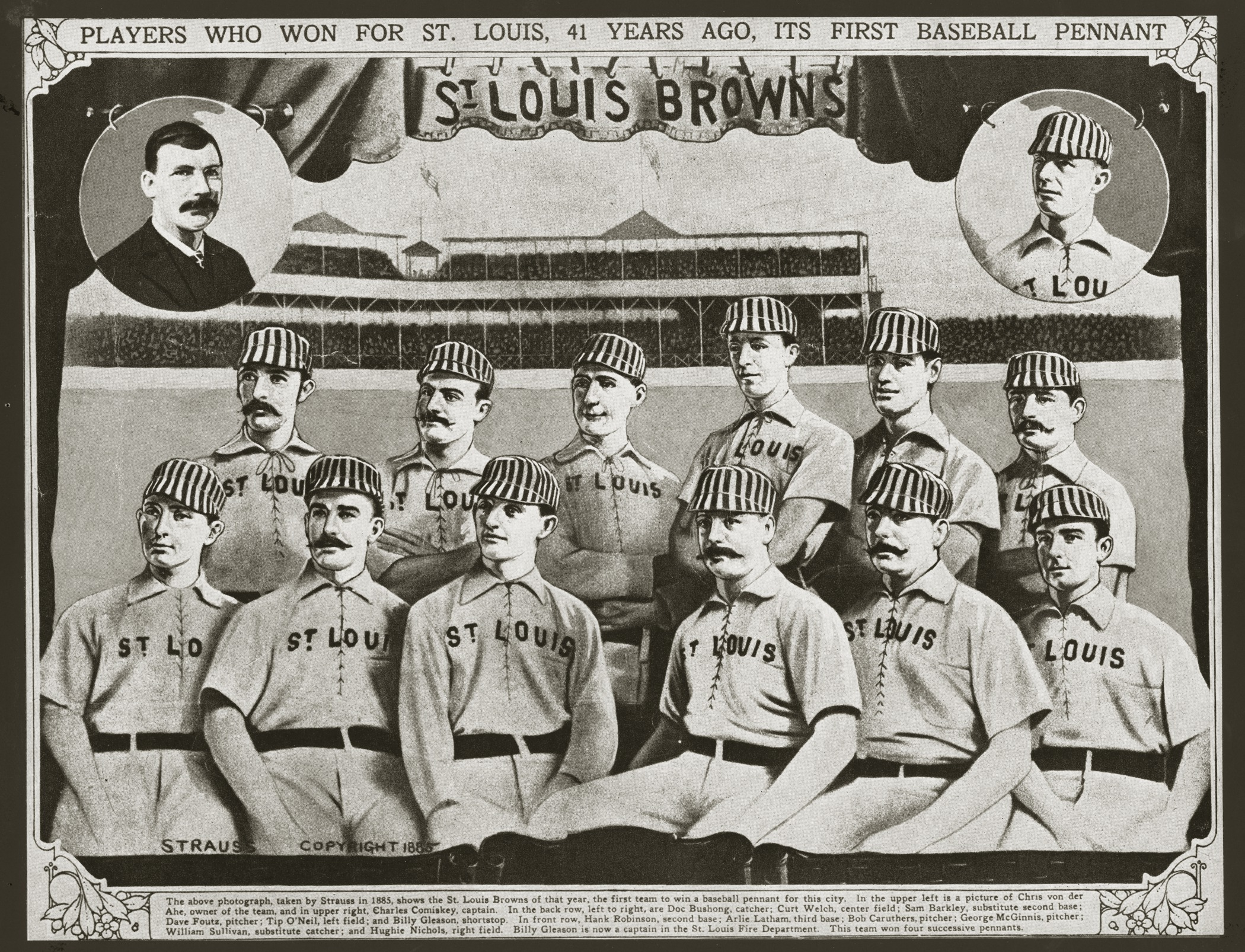
The 1885 St. Louis Browns of the American Association

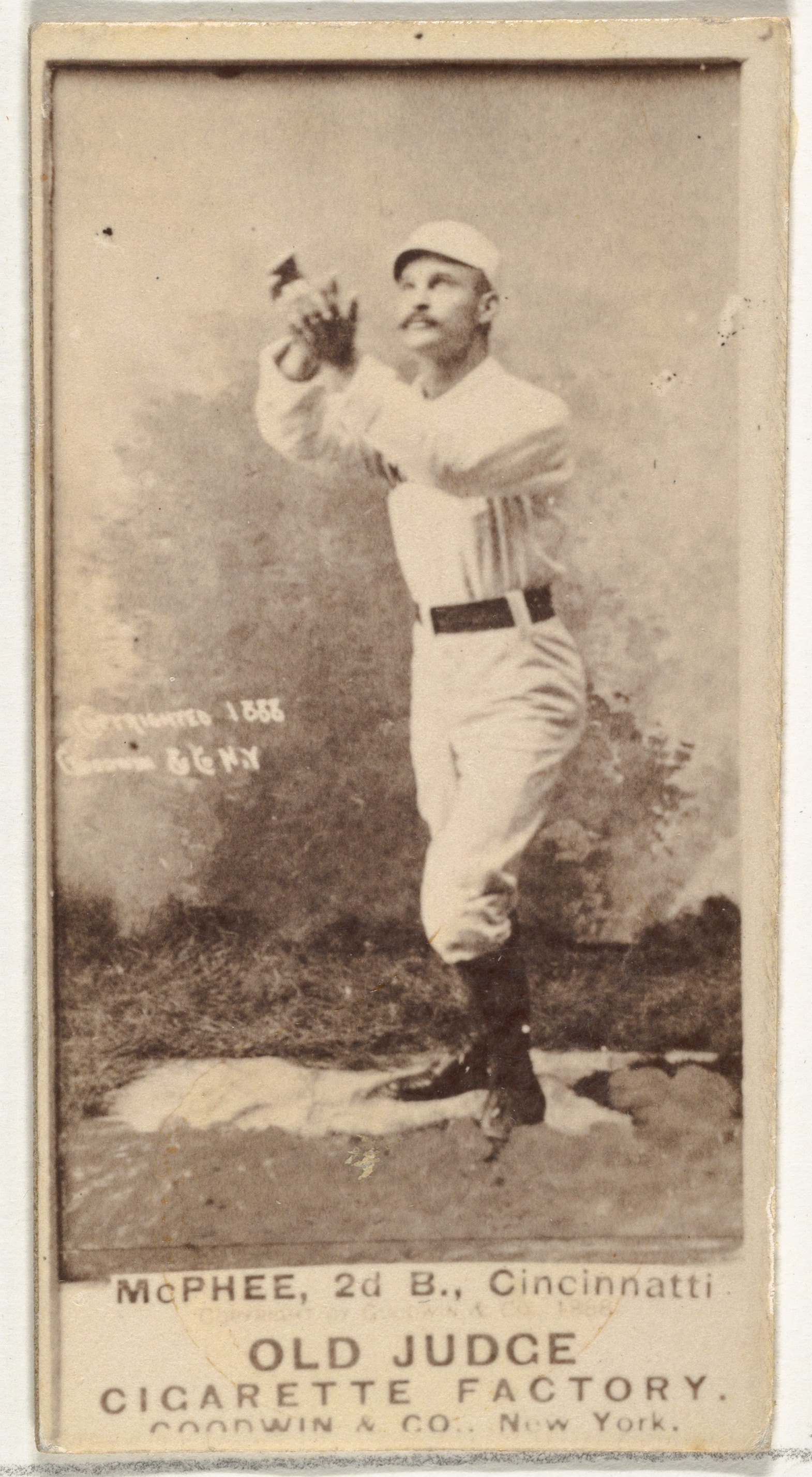
Bid McPhee

The American Association (AA) distinguished itself in several ways from what it considered to be the puritanical National League (NL). The new league established teams in what the NL leaders pejoratively called "river cities", including Pittsburgh, Cincinnati, Louisville and St. Louis, with the inherent implication of lower morality or social standards in those cities. In contrast to the NL, the AA offered cheaper ticket prices, Sunday games and alcoholic beverages to its patrons.

On November 8, 1881, at the Gibson House in Cincinnati, it was decided that individual teams in the league-to-be would operate their own affairs and set their own admission prices, under an agreement called the "guarantee system". The NL at that time prohibited the sale of alcohol on its grounds, while the AA had no such restrictions, especially as several of its teams were backed by breweries and distilleries. The AA became known as "The Beer and Whiskey League", another pejorative term applied by NL owners, which did not seem to bother the fans of the Association's clubs.

Beginning in 1884 and continuing through 1890, the champion of the AA met the champion of the NL in an early version of the World Series. These early Series were less organized than the modern version, with as few as three games played and as many as fifteen, and the contests of 1885 and 1890 ending in disputed ties. The NL won four of these Series, while the AA won only one, in 1886 when the St. Louis Browns (now the St. Louis Cardinals) defeated the Chicago White Stockings (now the Chicago Cubs).

Over its lifetime, the AA was weakened by several factors. One was the tendency of some of its teams to jump to the NL. The consistently stronger NL was in better position to survive adverse conditions. Some owners of AA teams also owned a NL team. The most significant blow to the AA was dealt by the Players' League, a third major league formed in 1890, which siphoned off talent and gate receipts. In a rare historical oddity, the Brooklyn Bridegrooms (now the Los Angeles Dodgers) won the league's championship and represented the AA in the 1889 World Series, switched to the NL during the off-season, and then repeated the same feat. Though during the initial offseason between 1891 and 1892, the Association was looking to expand (including the approval of a Chicago-based team on October 23), the league formally dissolved on December 18, 1891, at 11:10 AM, having officially merged with the National League (with the new formal name, the "National League and American Association of Baseball Clubs".

No player who spent the majority of his career in the AA is in the National Baseball Hall of Fame, although Bid McPhee of the Cincinnati Reds played eight of his eighteen seasons in the AA before the Reds moved to the National League. The living legacy of the old Association is the group of teams that came over to the National League to stay. The Pirates moved to the NL after the 1886 season, the Bridegrooms/Dodgers and the Cincinnati Reds after the 1889 season, and the Browns/Cardinals after the American Association folded following the 1891 season. Following the reorganization and contraction of the NL from 12 teams down to 8 in 1900, half of the eight surviving teams were former members of the AA. Several of the AA's ballparks survived into the 1960s: the ballpark used by the 1891 Washington club evolved into Griffith Stadium; the home of the St. Louis Browns, Sportsman's Park; and the city block occupied by the Reds, which evolved into Crosley Field. Other than the clubs themselves, Crosley Field was the last physical remnant of the AA—it was the home field of the Cincinnati Reds until mid-season 1970 and was razed in April 1972.

During the AA's existence, four clubs defected to the NL: Allegheny City (joined NL 1887, later became the Pittsburgh Pirates), the Cleveland Spiders (joined NL 1889), the Brooklyn Bridegrooms (joined NL 1890, eventually renamed the Dodgers), and the Cincinnati Reds (joined NL 1890). At the AA's demise in 1891, four additional clubs joined the NL: the St. Louis Browns (later the Cardinals), the Louisville Colonels, the Washington Statesmen (renamed the Senators), and the Baltimore Orioles. Therefore, from 1892 to 1899, when the NL consisted of 12 teams, 8 of them had been former AA clubs. When the National League contracted from twelve teams down to eight for the 1900 season, Louisville, Washington, Baltimore, and Cleveland were eliminated, leaving an eight team National League with four former AA clubs remaining, all of which continue to play today: the Pittsburgh Pirates, the Cincinnati Reds, the Brooklyn Superbas (later the Los Angeles Dodgers), and the St. Louis Cardinals. All four have posted more than 10,000 all-time major-league victories.

AA statistics are recognized by Major League Baseball (MLB), the AA being one of six leagues deemed "major" by the Special Baseball Records Committee of Major League Baseball in 1969. (Note: The other five leagues recognized as major in 1969 were the National League, American League, Union Association (1884), Players' League (1890), and Federal League (1914–1915). In late 2020, several leagues within Negro league baseball were also recognized.)

== Pennant winners of the AA ==
- 1882 Cincinnati Red Stockings
- 1883 Philadelphia Athletics
- 1884 New York Metropolitans (lost World Series, 3–0, to Providence NL)
- 1885 St. Louis Browns (tied World Series, 3–3–1, with Chicago NL)
- 1886 St. Louis Browns (won World Series, 4–2, over Chicago NL)
- 1887 St. Louis Browns (lost World Series, 10–5, to Detroit NL)
- 1888 St. Louis Browns (lost World Series, 6–2, to New York NL)
- 1889 Brooklyn Bridegrooms (lost World Series, 6–3, to New York NL)
- 1890 Louisville Colonels (tied World Series, 3–3–1, with Brooklyn NL)
- 1891 Boston Reds

== American Association franchises ==
Franchise	Franchise name with all recorded nicknames
Years	Years that the franchise were active in the AA
Home-field	The home-field ballpark(s) in which the franchise played
Titles	How many league titles the franchise won in the AA
†	Franchise later joined the National League
§	Franchise transferred in from the Players' League

Franchise	Years	Home-field	Titles	Notes	Ref
Baltimore Orioles^{†}	1882–1889, 1890–1891	Newington Park/Oriole Park I, II, III	0	Played part of the 1890 season in the Atlantic Association	
Cincinnati Red Stockings^{†}	1882–1889	Bank Street Grounds/League Park I	1	This franchise currently exists as the Cincinnati Reds	
Louisville Colonels^{†}	1882–1891	Eclipse Park I	1		
Philadelphia Athletics	1882–1890	Oakdale Park/Jefferson Street Grounds	1		
Pittsburgh Alleghenys^{†}	1882–1886	Exposition Park I, II/Recreation Park	0	This franchise currently exists as the Pittsburgh Pirates	
St. Louis Brown Stockings/Browns^{†}	1882–1891	Sportsman's Park I	4	This franchise currently exists as the St. Louis Cardinals	
Columbus Buckeyes	1883–1884	Recreation Park I	0		
New York Metropolitans	1883–1887	Polo Grounds I/Metropolitan Park/St. George Cricket Grounds	1		
Brooklyn Atlantics/Grays/Bridegrooms^{†}	1884–1889	Washington Park/Ridgewood Park II	1	This franchise currently exists as the Los Angeles Dodgers	
Indianapolis Hoosiers	1884	Seventh Street Park I/Bruce Grounds	0		
Richmond Virginians	1884	Allen Pasture	0		
Toledo Blue Stockings	1884	League Park	0		
Washington Nationals	1884	Athletic Park	0		
Cleveland Forest Citys/Blues^{†}	1887–1888	Kennard Street Park	0		
Kansas City Cowboys	1888–1889	Association Park/Exposition Park	0		
Columbus Solons	1889–1891	Recreation Park II	0		
Brooklyn Gladiators	1890	Ridgewood Park II/Polo Grounds III	0		
Rochester Broncos/Hop Bitters	1890	Culver Field I/Polo Grounds III	0		
Syracuse Stars	1890	Star Park II	0		
Toledo Maumees	1890	Speranza Park	0		
Boston Reds^{§}	1891	Congress Street Grounds	1	Transferred from the Players' League after 1890 season	
Cincinnati Kelly's Killers	1891	East End Park	0	Also referred to as the Reds and the Porkers	
Milwaukee Brewers	1891	Athletic Park	0	Transferred to the Western League in 1892.	
Philadelphia Athletics^{§}	1891	Forepaugh Park	0	Transferred from the Players' League after 1890 season	
Washington Statesmen^{†}	1891	Boundary Field	0		

== Timeline ==
The first line is the formation of the American Association (AA) in 1882, and the second marks the end of the American Association.

World's Championship Series championships are shown with a "•", American Association Pennants in non-World Championship Series seasons are shown with a "#", and American Association Pennant winners who tied or lost the World Championship Series are shown with a "^".

1. The 1884 Washington Statesmen were replaced during the season by the Richmond Virginians.
2. For the 1891 season, the Philadelphia Athletics were replaced by the Philadelphia Quakers of the Player's League.
3. The 1891 Cincinnati Kelly's Killers folded during the season and were replaced by the Milwaukee Brewers.
4. All non-American Association labels not labeled "NL" (National League) or "PL" (Players' League) are minor league teams.
- 1882 – AA forms with six teams
- 1883 – AA expands to eight teams
- 1884 – AA expands to twelve teams in response to Union Association threat
- 1885 – AA returns to eight teams
- 1887 – Allegheny ("Pittsburgh Alleghenys") leave AA to join NL
- 1889 – Cleveland Spiders leave AA to join NL
- 1890 – Cincinnati Red Stockings and Brooklyn Bridegrooms leave AA to join NL
- 1892 – Baltimore Orioles, Louisville Colonels, St. Louis Browns, and Washington Senators join National League after the merger of the AA into the NL. Boston Reds, Columbus Solons, Philadelphia Athletics fold, and Milwaukee Brewers reverts to a minor league team.

== AA presidents ==
- H. D. McKnight (1882–1885)
- Wheeler C. Wyckoff (1886–1889)
- Zach Phelps (1890)
- Allen W. Thurman (1890–1891)
- Louis Kramer (1891)
- Ed Renau (1891)
- Zach Phelps (1891)
