= 1884 Baltimore Monumentals season =

1884 Baltimore Monumentals
- League: Union Association
- Ballpark: Belair Lot
- City: Baltimore, Maryland
- Record: 58–47 (.552)
- League place: 3rd
- Manager: Bill Henderson

The 1884 Baltimore Monumentals finished with a 58–47 record in the Union Association, finishing in fourth place. This was the only season this version of the team existed, and indeed the only season the Union Association existed.

== Regular season ==
=== Season standings ===
Union Association
Team	W	L	Pct.	GB	Home	Road
St. Louis Maroons	94	19	.832	—	49‍–‍6	45‍–‍13
Cincinnati Outlaw Reds	69	36	.657	21	35‍–‍17	34‍–‍19
Baltimore Monumentals	58	47	.552	32	29‍–‍21	29‍–‍26
Boston Reds	58	51	.532	34	34‍–‍22	24‍–‍29
Milwaukee Brewers	8	4	.667	35½	8‍–‍4	0‍–‍0
St. Paul Saints	2	6	.250	39½	0‍–‍0	2‍–‍6
Chicago Browns/Pittsburgh Stogies	41	50	.451	42	21‍–‍19	20‍–‍31
Altoona Mountain Citys	6	19	.240	44	6‍–‍12	0‍–‍7
Wilmington Quicksteps	2	16	.111	44½	1‍–‍6	1‍–‍10
Washington Nationals (UA)	47	65	.420	46½	36‍–‍27	11‍–‍38
Philadelphia Keystones	21	46	.313	50	14‍–‍21	7‍–‍25
Kansas City Cowboys	16	63	.203	61	11‍–‍23	5‍–‍40

=== Record vs. opponents ===
1884 Union Association record Sources:
Team	ALT	BLU	BSU	CUN	COR	KC	MIL	PHK	SLM	SPS	WST	WIL
Altoona	—	1–3	1–1	0–0	0–3	0–0	0–0	1–3	0–8	0–0	3–1	0–0
Baltimore	3–1	—	10–5–1	7–5	4–10	10–2	1–3	10–2	1–14	0–0	11–5	1–0
Boston	1–1	5–10–1	—	4–8–1	5–11	8–4	2–2	8–3	8–8	0–0	12–4	5–0
Chicago/Pittsburgh	0–0	5–7	8–4–1	—	7–8	12–4	0–0	3–5	2–14	0–0	4–8–1	0–0
Cincinnati	3–0	10–4	11–5	8–7	—	9–1	0–0	9–0	4–12	3–0	10–6	2–1
Kansas City	0–0	2–10	4–8	4–12	1–9	—	0–0	0–4	0–11–1	1–1–1	4–8–1	0–0
Milwaukee	0–0	3–1	2–2	0–0	0–0	0–0	—	0–0	0–0	0–0	3–1	0–0
Philadelphia	3–1	2–10	3–8	5–3	0–9	4–0	0–0	—	0–8	0–0	4–7	0–0
St. Louis	8–0	14–1	8–8	14–2	12–4	11–0–1	0–0	8–0	—	2–1	13–3	4–0
St. Paul	0–0	0–0	0–0	0–0	0–3	1–1–1	0–0	0–0	1–2	—	0–0	0–0
Washington	1–3	5–11	4–12	8–4–1	6–10	8–4–1	1–3	7–4	3–13	0–0	—	4–1
Wilmington	0–0	0–1	0–5	0–0	1–2	0–0	0–0	0–0	0–4	0–0	1–4	—

=== Roster ===
1884 Baltimore Monumentals
Roster
Pitchers: Al Atkinson; Tom Lee; John Ryan; Ed Smith; Bill Sweeney	Catchers: John Cuff; Eddie Fusselback; Bill Morgan; Tony Suck; Rooney Sweeney; Infielders: Joe Battin; John Burns; Joe Ellick; Gid Gardner; Charlie Levis; Dick Phelan; Yank Robinson; Lou Say; Jumbo Schoeneck	Outfielders: Frank Bahret; Frank Beck; Ned Cuthbert; Joseph Dorsey; Bernie Graham; Chris McFarland; James Morris; John O'Brien; Henry Oberbeck; Scott; Emmett Seery; Taylor Shafer; Al Skinner; Smith; Joe Stanley; Bill Tierney; Harry Wheeler	Manager: Bill Henderson

== Player stats ==
=== Batting ===
==== Starters by position ====
Note: Pos = Position; G = Games played; AB = At bats; H = Hits; Avg. = Batting average; HR = Home runs

Pos	Player	G	AB	H	Avg.	HR
C	Eddie Fusselback	68	303	86	.284	1
1B	Charlie Levis	87	373	85	.228	6
2B	Dick Phelan	101	402	99	.246	3
3B	Yank Robinson	102	415	111	.267	2
SS	Lou Say	78	339	81	.239	2
OF	Emmett Seery	105	463	144	.311	2
OF	Ned Cuthbert	44	168	34	.202	0
OF	Bernie Graham	41	167	45	.269	0

==== Other batters ====
Note: G = Games played; AB = At bats; H = Hits; Avg. = Batting average; HR = Home runs

Player	G	AB	H	Avg.	HR
Rooney Sweeney	48	186	42	.226	0
Henry Oberbeck	33	125	23	.184	0
John O'Brien	18	77	19	.247	0
Harry Wheeler	17	69	18	.261	0
Jumbo Schoeneck	16	60	15	.250	0
Joe Battin	17	59	6	.102	0
Scott	13	53	12	.226	1
Joe Ellick	7	27	4	.148	0
Joe Stanley	6	21	5	.238	0
Frank Beck	5	20	2	.100	0
Chris McFarland	3	14	3	.231	0
Taylor Shafer	3	13	1	.077	0
John Cuff	3	11	1	.091	0
Tony Suck	3	10	3	.300	0
Bill Morgan	2	9	2	.222	0
Frank Bahret	2	8	0	.000	0
John Burns	1	4	2	.500	0
Gid Gardner	1	4	1	.250	0
Bill Tierney	1	3	1	.333	0
Al Skinner	1	3	1	.333	0
James Morris	1	3	0	.000	0
Joseph Dorsey	1	3	0	.000	0

=== Pitching ===
==== Starting pitchers ====
Note: G = Games pitched; IP = Innings pitched; W = Wins; L = Losses; ERA = Earned run average; SO = Strikeouts

Player	G	IP	W	L	ERA	SO
Bill Sweeney	62	538.0	40	21	2.59	374
Tom Lee	15	122.0	5	8	3.39	81
Al Atkinson	8	69.2	3	5	2.33	50
Ed Smith	9	62.0	3	4	3.48	13
John Ryan	6	51.0	3	2	3.35	33
Frank Beck	2	9.0	0	2	8.00	7
Smith	1	6.0	0	0	9.00	2
Jerry Dorsey	1	4.0	0	1	9.00	3
Chris McFarland	1	3.0	0	1	15.00	3

==== Other pitchers ====
Note: G = Games pitched; IP = Innings pitched; W = Wins; L = Losses; ERA = Earned run average; SO = Strikeouts

Player	G	IP	W	L	ERA	SO
Yank Robinson	11	75.0	3	3	3.48	61
Henry Oberbeck	2	6.0	0	0	3.00	1

==== Relief pitchers ====
Note: G = Games pitched; W = Wins; L = Losses; SV = Saves; ERA = Earned run average; SO = Strikeouts

Player	G	W	L	SV	ERA	SO
James Morris	1	0	0	0	9.00	0
