= 1884 Chicago Browns/Pittsburgh Stogies season =

1884 Chicago Browns/Pittsburgh Stogies
- League: Union Association
- Ballpark: South Side Park, Exposition Park
- City: Chicago, Illinois, Allegheny City, Pennsylvania
- Record: 41–50 (.451)
- Owner: A. H. Henderson
- Managers: Ed Hengel, Joe Battin, Joe Ellick

The 1884 Chicago Browns/Pittsburgh Stogies finished with a 41–50 record (34–39 while in Chicago, 7–11 while in Allegheny City) in the Union Association, finishing in sixth place. This was the only season the team existed, and indeed the only season the Union Association existed.

The team moved from Chicago to Allegheny City (today a part of Pittsburgh's North Shore) after their game of August 22. The team folded completely after their game of September 18, which was about a month before the 1884 season was scheduled to be over.

With the Wilmington Quicksteps also having folded on September 21, and with about a dozen games remaining to be played, for the final games of the season the two defunct teams were replaced by teams from Milwaukee and St. Paul.

== Regular season ==
=== Season standings ===
Union Association
Team	W	L	Pct.	GB	Home	Road
St. Louis Maroons	94	19	.832	—	49‍–‍6	45‍–‍13
Cincinnati Outlaw Reds	69	36	.657	21	35‍–‍17	34‍–‍19
Baltimore Monumentals	58	47	.552	32	29‍–‍21	29‍–‍26
Boston Reds	58	51	.532	34	34‍–‍22	24‍–‍29
Milwaukee Brewers	8	4	.667	35½	8‍–‍4	0‍–‍0
St. Paul Saints	2	6	.250	39½	0‍–‍0	2‍–‍6
Chicago Browns/Pittsburgh Stogies	41	50	.451	42	21‍–‍19	20‍–‍31
Altoona Mountain Citys	6	19	.240	44	6‍–‍12	0‍–‍7
Wilmington Quicksteps	2	16	.111	44½	1‍–‍6	1‍–‍10
Washington Nationals (UA)	47	65	.420	46½	36‍–‍27	11‍–‍38
Philadelphia Keystones	21	46	.313	50	14‍–‍21	7‍–‍25
Kansas City Cowboys	16	63	.203	61	11‍–‍23	5‍–‍40

=== Record vs. opponents ===
1884 Union Association record Sources:
Team	ALT	BLU	BSU	CUN	COR	KC	MIL	PHK	SLM	SPS	WST	WIL
Altoona	—	1–3	1–1	0–0	0–3	0–0	0–0	1–3	0–8	0–0	3–1	0–0
Baltimore	3–1	—	10–5–1	7–5	4–10	10–2	1–3	10–2	1–14	0–0	11–5	1–0
Boston	1–1	5–10–1	—	4–8–1	5–11	8–4	2–2	8–3	8–8	0–0	12–4	5–0
Chicago/Pittsburgh	0–0	5–7	8–4–1	—	7–8	12–4	0–0	3–5	2–14	0–0	4–8–1	0–0
Cincinnati	3–0	10–4	11–5	8–7	—	9–1	0–0	9–0	4–12	3–0	10–6	2–1
Kansas City	0–0	2–10	4–8	4–12	1–9	—	0–0	0–4	0–11–1	1–1–1	4–8–1	0–0
Milwaukee	0–0	3–1	2–2	0–0	0–0	0–0	—	0–0	0–0	0–0	3–1	0–0
Philadelphia	3–1	2–10	3–8	5–3	0–9	4–0	0–0	—	0–8	0–0	4–7	0–0
St. Louis	8–0	14–1	8–8	14–2	12–4	11–0–1	0–0	8–0	—	2–1	13–3	4–0
St. Paul	0–0	0–0	0–0	0–0	0–3	1–1–1	0–0	0–0	1–2	—	0–0	0–0
Washington	1–3	5–11	4–12	8–4–1	6–10	8–4–1	1–3	7–4	3–13	0–0	—	4–1
Wilmington	0–0	0–1	0–5	0–0	1–2	0–0	0–0	0–0	0–4	0–0	1–4	—

=== Roster ===
1884 Chicago Browns/Pittsburgh Stogies
Roster
Pitchers: Al Atkinson; Charlie Cady; Hugh Daily; Frank Foreman; Patrick Horan; Cyclone Miller; Catchers: Emil Gross; Bill Krieg; Tony Suck	Infielders: Charlie Berry; Frank Bishop; Phil Coridan; Dan Cronin; Charlie Fisher; Will Foley; Moxie Hengel; Charlie Householder; Harry Koons; Jack Leary; Steve Matthias; Chippy McGarr; Frank McLaughlin; Art Richardson; Jumbo Schoeneck; Willis Wyman	Outfielders: Charlie Baker; Charlie Briggs; Joe Ellick; Gid Gardner; Bernie Graham; Al Skinner; Harry Wheeler	Manager: Joe Battin; Joe Ellick; Ed Hengel

== Player stats ==
=== Batting ===
==== Starters by position ====
Note: Pos = Position; G = Games played; AB = At bats; H = Hits; Avg. = Batting average; HR = Home runs

Pos	Player	G	AB	H	Avg.	HR
C	Bill Krieg	71	279	69	.247	0
1B	Jumbo Schoeneck	90	366	116	.317	2
2B	Moxie Hengel	19	74	15	.203	0
3B	Charlie Householder	83	310	74	.239	1
SS	Steve Matthias	37	142	39	.275	0
OF	Charlie Briggs	49	182	31	.170	1
OF	Joe Ellick	92	394	93	.236	0
OF	Harry Wheeler	37	158	36	.228	1

==== Other batters ====
Note: G = Games played; AB = At bats; H = Hits; Avg. = Batting average; HR = Home runs

Player	G	AB	H	Avg.	HR
Tony Suck	53	188	28	.149	0
Gid Gardner	38	149	38	.255	0
Emil Gross	23	95	34	.358	4
Will Foley	19	71	20	.282	0
Chippy McGarr	19	70	11	.157	0
Joe Battin	18	69	13	.188	0
Frank McLaughlin	15	67	16	.239	0
Charlie Baker	15	57	8	.140	0
George Strief	15	53	11	.208	0
Jack Leary	10	40	7	.175	0
Charlie Berry	7	27	3	.111	0
Frank Bishop	4	16	3	.188	0
Willis Wyman	2	8	3	.375	0
Phil Coridan	2	7	1	.143	0
Bernie Graham	1	5	1	.200	0
Dan Cronin	1	4	1	.250	0
Art Richardson	1	4	0	.000	0
Charlie Fisher	1	3	2	.667	0
Al Skinner	1	3	1	.333	0
Harry Koons	1	3	0	.000	0
Kid Baldwin	1	1	1	1.000	0

=== Pitching ===
==== Starting pitchers ====
Note: G = Games pitched; IP = Innings pitched; W = Wins; L = Losses; ERA = Earned run average; SO = Strikeouts

Player	G	IP	W	L	ERA	SO
Hugh Daily	56	484.2	27	27	2.43	469
Al Atkinson	16	140.0	6	10	2.76	104
Patrick Horan	13	98.0	3	6	3.49	55
Charlie Cady	4	35.0	3	1	2.83	15
Frank Foreman	3	18.0	1	2	4.00	10
Cyclone Miller	1	9.0	1	0	1.00	13
Gid Gardner	1	6.0	0	1	6.00	4

==== Other pitchers ====
Note: G = Games pitched; IP = Innings pitched; W = Wins; L = Losses; ERA = Earned run average; SO = Strikeouts

Player	G	IP	W	L	ERA	SO
Jack Leary	2	10.0	0	2	5.40	6

==== Relief pitchers ====
Note: G = Games pitched; W = Wins; L = Losses; SV = Saves; ERA = Earned run average; SO = Strikeouts

Player	G	W	L	SV	ERA	SO
Charlie Householder	2	0	0	0	0.00	3
