= List of Major League Baseball players (Sp–Sz) =

The following is a list of Major League Baseball players, retired or active.

== Sp through Sz ==
| Name | Debut | Final game | Position | Teams | Ref |
|---|---|---|---|---|---|
| Bob Spade | September 22, 1907 | July 21, 1910 | Pitcher | Cincinnati Reds, St. Louis Browns | |
| Warren Spahn β | April 19, 1942 | October 1, 1965 | Pitcher | Boston Braves, Milwaukee Braves, New York Mets, San Francisco Giants | |
| Albert Spalding β | May 5, 1871 | August 31, 1878 | Pitcher | Boston Red Stockings, Chicago White Stockings | |
| Dick Spalding | April 18, 1927 | July 12, 1928 | Outfielder | Philadelphia Phillies, Washington Senators | |
| Denard Span | April 6, 2008 | | Outfielder | Minnesota Twins | |
| Al Spangler | September 16, 1959 | September 12, 1971 | Outfielder | Milwaukee Braves, Houston Colt .45s/Astros, California Angels, Chicago Cubs | |
| Bill Spanswick | April 18, 1964 | September 20, 1964 | Pitcher | Boston Red Sox | |
| Jeff Sparks | September 12, 1999 | May 17, 2000 | Pitcher | Tampa Bay Devil Rays | |
| Steve Sparks (1995–2004 P) | April 28, 1995 | September 26, 2004 | Pitcher | Milwaukee Brewers, Anaheim Angels, Detroit Tigers, Oakland Athletics, Arizona Diamondbacks | |
| Steve Sparks (2000 P) | July 19, 2000 | August 2, 2000 | Pitcher | Pittsburgh Pirates | |
| Tully Sparks | September 15, 1897 | June 8, 1910 | Pitcher | Philadelphia Phillies, Pittsburgh Pirates, Milwaukee Brewers (1901), New York Giants | |
| Joe Sparma | May 20, 1964 | May 12, 1970 | Pitcher | Detroit Tigers, Montreal Expos | |
| Bob Speake | April 16, 1955 | June 8, 1959 | Outfielder | Chicago Cubs, San Francisco Giants | |
| Tris Speaker β | September 14, 1907 | August 30, 1928 | Outfielder | Boston Red Sox, Cleveland Indians, Washington Senators, Philadelphia Athletics | |
| Nate Spears | September 6, 2011 | | Second baseman | Boston Red Sox | |
| Cliff Speck | July 30, 1986 | September 25, 1986 | Pitcher | Atlanta Braves | |
| By Speece | April 21, 1924 | June 26, 1930 | Pitcher | Washington Senators, Cleveland Indians, Philadelphia Phillies | |
| Horace Speed | April 10, 1975 | June 26, 1979 | Outfielder | San Francisco Giants, Cleveland Indians | |
| Floyd Speer | April 25, 1943 | May 3, 1944 | Pitcher | Chicago White Sox | |
| Kid Speer | April 24, 1909 | October 1, 1909 | Pitcher | Detroit Tigers | |
| Tim Spehr | July 18, 1991 | September 28, 1999 | Catcher | Kansas City Royals, Montreal Expos, Atlanta Braves, New York Mets | |
| Chris Speier | April 7, 1971 | October 1, 1989 | Shortstop | San Francisco Giants, Montreal Expos, Minnesota Twins, St. Louis Cardinals, Chicago Cubs, San Francisco Giants | |
| Justin Speier | May 27, 1998 | | Pitcher | Chicago Cubs, Florida Marlins, Atlanta Braves, Cleveland Indians, Colorado Rockies, Toronto Blue Jays, Los Angeles Angels of Anaheim | |
| Ryan Speier | April 4, 2005 | | Pitcher | Colorado Rockies | |
| Levale Speigner | April 2, 2007 | | Pitcher | Washington Nationals | |
| Bob Spence | September 5, 1969 | September 6, 1971 | First baseman | Chicago White Sox | |
| Josh Spence | June 24, 2011 | | Pitcher | San Diego Padres | |
| Stan Spence | June 8, 1940 | October 2, 1949 | Outfielder | Boston Red Sox, Washington Senators, St. Louis Browns | |
| Spencer, first name unknown | June 3, 1872 | June 3, 1872 | Shortstop | Washington Nationals (NA) | |
| Ben Spencer | September 8, 1913 | September 19, 1913 | Outfielder | Washington Senators | |
| Chet Spencer | August 22, 1906 | August 29, 1906 | Outfielder | Boston Beaneaters | |
| Daryl Spencer | September 17, 1952 | July 11, 1963 | Utility infielder | New York Giants, San Francisco Giants, St. Louis Cardinals, Los Angeles Dodgers, Cincinnati Reds | |
| George Spencer | August 17, 1950 | September 26, 1960 | Pitcher | New York Giants, Detroit Tigers | |
| Glenn Spencer | April 11, 1928 | September 24, 1933 | Pitcher | Pittsburgh Pirates, New York Giants | |
| Hack Spencer | April 18, 1912 | April 18, 1912 | Pitcher | St. Louis Browns | |
| Jim Spencer | September 7, 1968 | June 20, 1982 | First baseman | California Angels, Texas Rangers, New York Yankees, Oakland Athletics | |
| Roy Spencer | April 19, 1925 | May 9, 1938 | Catcher | Pittsburgh Pirates, Washington Senators, Cleveland Indians, New York Giants, Brooklyn Dodgers | |
| Sean Spencer | May 6, 1999 | September 28, 2000 | Pitcher | Seattle Mariners, Montreal Expos | |
| Shane Spencer | April 10, 1998 | July 22, 2004 | Outfielder | New York Yankees, Cleveland Indians, Texas Rangers, New York Mets | |
| Stan Spencer | April 27, 1998 | June 19, 2000 | Pitcher | San Diego Padres | |
| Tom Spencer | July 17, 1978 | August 26, 1978 | Outfielder | Chicago White Sox | |
| Tubby Spencer | July 23, 1905 | September 1, 1918 | Catcher | St. Louis Browns, Boston Red Sox, Philadelphia Phillies, Detroit Tigers | |
| Vern Spencer | July 4, 1920 | October 1, 1920 | Outfielder | New York Giants | |
| Paul Speraw | September 15, 1920 | September 15, 1920 | Third baseman | St. Louis Browns | |
| Ed Sperber | April 16, 1924 | May 1, 1925 | Outfielder | Boston Braves | |
| Rob Sperring | August 11, 1974 | October 2, 1977 | Utility infielder | Chicago Cubs, Houston Astros | |
| Stan Sperry | July 28, 1936 | September 29, 1938 | Second baseman | Philadelphia Phillies, Philadelphia Athletics | |
| Bob Spicer | April 17, 1955 | September 22, 1956 | Pitcher | Kansas City Athletics | |
| Bill Spiers | April 7, 1989 | April 8, 2001 | Utility infielder | Milwaukee Brewers, New York Mets, Houston Astros | |
| Harry Spies | April 20, 1895 | September 29, 1895 | First baseman | Cincinnati Reds, Louisville Colonels | |
| Ed Spiezio | July 23, 1964 | September 27, 1972 | Third baseman | St. Louis Cardinals, San Diego Padres, Chicago White Sox | |
| Scott Spiezio | September 14, 1996 | September 30, 2007 | Utility infielder | Oakland Athletics, Anaheim Angels, Seattle Mariners, St. Louis Cardinals | |
| Charlie Spikes | September 1, 1972 | October 5, 1980 | Outfielder | New York Yankees, Cleveland Indians, Detroit Tigers, Atlanta Braves | |
| Ryan Spilborghs | July 16, 2005 | | Outfielder | Colorado Rockies | |
| Dan Spillner | May 21, 1974 | October 5, 1985 | Pitcher | San Diego Padres, Cleveland Indians, Chicago White Sox | |
| Harry Spilman | September 11, 1978 | September 30, 1989 | First baseman | Cincinnati Reds, Houston Astros, Detroit Tigers, San Francisco Giants | |
| Hal Spindel | April 23, 1939 | June 9, 1946 | Catcher | St. Louis Browns, Philadelphia Phillies | |
| Scipio Spinks | September 16, 1969 | June 9, 1973 | Pitcher | Houston Astros, St. Louis Cardinals | |
| Junior Spivey | June 2, 2001 | September 27, 2005 | Second baseman | Arizona Diamondbacks, Milwaukee Brewers, Washington Nationals | |
| Paul Splittorff | September 23, 1970 | June 26, 1984 | Pitcher | Kansas City Royals | |
| Andy Spognardi | September 2, 1932 | September 25, 1932 | Second baseman | Boston Red Sox | |
| Al Spohrer | April 13, 1928 | September 29, 1935 | Catcher | New York Giants, Boston Braves | |
| Paul Spoljaric | April 6, 1994 | September 28, 2000 | Pitcher | Toronto Blue Jays, Seattle Mariners, Philadelphia Phillies, Kansas City Royals | |
| Carl Spongberg | August 1, 1908 | August 1, 1908 | Pitcher | Chicago Cubs | |
| Karl Spooner | September 22, 1954 | September 17, 1955 | Pitcher | Brooklyn Dodgers | |
| Tim Spooneybarger | September 5, 2001 | June 11, 2003 | Pitcher | Atlanta Braves, Florida Marlins | |
| Jim Spotts | April 23, 1930 | June 22, 1930 | Catcher | Philadelphia Phillies | |
| Jerry Spradlin | July 2, 1993 | September 29, 2000 | Pitcher | Cincinnati Reds, Philadelphia Phillies, Cleveland Indians, San Francisco Giants, Kansas City Royals, Chicago Cubs | |
| Homer Spragins | September 13, 1947 | September 21, 1947 | Pitcher | Philadelphia Phillies | |
| Charlie Sprague | September 17, 1887 | October 10, 1890 | Pitcher | Chicago White Stockings, Cleveland Spiders, Toledo Maumees | |
| Ed Sprague Sr. | April 10, 1968 | June 5, 1976 | Pitcher | Oakland Athletics, Cincinnati Reds, St. Louis Cardinals, Milwaukee Brewers | |
| Ed Sprague Jr. | May 8, 1991 | October 7, 2001 | Third baseman | Toronto Blue Jays, Oakland Athletics, Pittsburgh Pirates, San Diego Padres, Boston Red Sox, Seattle Mariners | |
| Harry Spratt | April 13, 1911 | June 3, 1912 | Shortstop | Boston Rustlers/Braves | |
| George Spriggs | September 15, 1965 | October 1, 1970 | Outfielder | Pittsburgh Pirates, Kansas City Royals | |
| Jack Spring | April 16, 1955 | August 1, 1965 | Pitcher | Los Angeles Angels, Chicago Cubs, St. Louis Cardinals, Cleveland Indians | |
| Brad Springer | May 1, 1925 | April 23, 1926 | Pitcher | St. Louis Browns, Cincinnati Reds | |
| Dennis Springer | September 13, 1995 | May 26, 2002 | Pitcher | Philadelphia Phillies, California/Anaheim Angels, Tampa Bay Devil Rays, Florida Marlins, New York Mets, Los Angeles Dodgers | |
| Ed Springer | July 12, 1889 | July 12, 1889 | Pitcher | Louisville Colonels | |
| Russ Springer | April 17, 1992 | | Pitcher | New York Yankees, California Angels, Philadelphia Phillies, Houston Astros, Arizona Diamondbacks, Atlanta Braves, St. Louis Cardinals, Tampa Bay Rays, Cincinnati Reds | |
| Steve Springer | May 22, 1990 | August 25, 1992 | Third baseman | Cleveland Indians, New York Mets | |
| Joe Sprinz | July 16, 1930 | May 18, 1933 | Catcher | Cleveland Indians, St. Louis Cardinals | |
| Charlie Sproull | April 19, 1945 | September 21, 1945 | Pitcher | Philadelphia Phillies | |
| Bob Sprout | September 27, 1961 | September 27, 1961 | Pitcher | Los Angeles Angels | |
| Bobby Sprowl | September 5, 1978 | October 3, 1981 | Pitcher | Boston Red Sox, Houston Astros | |
| Freddy Spurgeon | September 19, 1924 | September 3, 1927 | Second baseman | Cleveland Indians | |
| Jay Spurgeon | August 15, 2000 | September 28, 2000 | Pitcher | Baltimore Orioles | |
| Chris Spurling | April 2, 2003 | | Pitcher | Detroit Tigers, Milwaukee Brewers | |
| Ed Spurney | June 26, 1891 | June 29, 1891 | Shortstop | Pittsburgh Pirates | |
| Mike Squires | September 1, 1975 | September 24, 1985 | First baseman | Chicago White Sox | |
| Ebba St. Claire | April 17, 1951 | May 18, 1954 | Catcher | Boston/Milwaukee Braves, New York Giants | |
| Randy St. Claire | September 11, 1984 | May 31, 1994 | Pitcher | Montreal Expos, Cincinnati Reds, Minnesota Twins, Atlanta Braves, Toronto Blue Jays | |
| Max St. Pierre | September 4, 2010 | | Catcher | Detroit Tigers | |
| Jim St. Vrain | April 20, 1902 | June 14, 1902 | Pitcher | Chicago Cubs | |
| Joe Stabell | September 19, 1885 | September 29, 1885 | Outfielder | Buffalo Bisons (NL) | |
| George Stablein | September 20, 1980 | October 4, 1980 | Pitcher | San Diego Padres | |
| Eddie Stack | June 7, 1910 | August 3, 1914 | Pitcher | Philadelphia Phillies, Brooklyn Dodgers/Superbas, Chicago Cubs | |
| Marv Staehle | September 15, 1964 | June 13, 1971 | Second baseman | Chicago White Sox, Montreal Expos, Atlanta Braves | |
| Bill Stafford | August 17, 1960 | September 19, 1967 | Pitcher | New York Yankees, Kansas City Athletics | |
| Stafford | October 12, 1890 | October 12, 1890 | Outfielder | Philadelphia Athletics (AA) | |
| General Stafford | August 27, 1890 | October 12, 1899 | Outfielder | Buffalo Bisons (PL), New York Giants, Louisville Colonels, Boston Beaneaters, Washington Senators (1891–99) | |
| Heinie Stafford | October 5, 1916 | October 5, 1916 | Pinch hitter | New York Giants | |
| John Stafford | June 15, 1893 | July 7, 1893 | Pitcher | Cleveland Spiders | |
| Steve Staggs | July 1, 1977 | June 20, 1978 | Second baseman | Toronto Blue Jays, Oakland Athletics | |
| Chick Stahl | April 19, 1897 | October 6, 1906 | Outfielder | Boston Beaneaters, Boston Americans | |
| Jake Stahl | April 20, 1903 | June 13, 1913 | First baseman | Boston Americans, Washington Senators, New York Highlanders, Boston Red Sox | |
| Larry Stahl | September 11, 1964 | September 30, 1973 | Outfielder | Kansas City Athletics, New York Mets, San Diego Padres, Cincinnati Reds | |
| Scott Stahoviak | September 10, 1993 | July 3, 1998 | First baseman | Minnesota Twins | |
| Roy Staiger | September 12, 1975 | September 23, 1979 | Third baseman | New York Mets, New York Yankees | |
| Tuck Stainback | April 17, 1934 | September 29, 1946 | Outfielder | Chicago Cubs, St. Louis Cardinals, Philadelphia Phillies, Brooklyn Dodgers, Detroit Tigers, New York Yankees, Philadelphia Athletics | |
| Matt Stairs | May 29, 1992 | July 22, 2011 | Outfielder | Montreal Expos, Boston Red Sox, Oakland Athletics, Chicago Cubs, Milwaukee Brewers, Pittsburgh Pirates, Kansas City Royals, Texas Rangers, Detroit Tigers, Toronto Blue Jays, Philadelphia Phillies, San Diego Padres, Washington Nationals | |
| Gale Staley | September 16, 1925 | October 2, 1925 | Second baseman | Chicago Cubs | |
| Gerry Staley | April 20, 1947 | September 27, 1961 | Pitcher | St. Louis Cardinals, Cincinnati Reds, New York Yankees, Chicago White Sox, Kansas City Athletics, Detroit Tigers | |
| Harry Staley | June 23, 1888 | July 30, 1895 | Pitcher | Pittsburgh Alleghenys, Pittsburgh Burghers, Boston Beaneaters, St. Louis Cardinals | |
| Tracy Stallard | September 24, 1960 | July 24, 1966 | Pitcher | Boston Red Sox, New York Mets, St. Louis Cardinals | |
| Virgil Stallcup | April 18, 1947 | April 25, 1953 | Shortstop | Cincinnati Reds, St. Louis Cardinals | |
| George Staller | September 14, 1943 | October 3, 1943 | Outfielder | Philadelphia Athletics | |
| George Stallings | May 22, 1890 | May 25, 1898 | Catcher | Brooklyn Bridegrooms, Philadelphia Phillies | |
| Craig Stammen | May 21, 2009 | | Pitcher | Washington Nationals | |
| Oscar Stanage | May 19, 1906 | June 17, 1925 | Catcher | Cincinnati Reds, Detroit Tigers | |
| Charley Stanceu | April 16, 1941 | September 26, 1946 | Pitcher | New York Yankees, Philadelphia Phillies | |
| Jerry Standaert | April 16, 1925 | May 30, 1929 | Utility infielder | Brooklyn Robins, Boston Red Sox | |
| Jason Standridge | July 29, 2001 | | Pitcher | Tampa Bay Devil Rays, Texas Rangers, Cincinnati Reds, Kansas City Royals | |
| Pete Standridge | September 19, 1911 | October 2, 1915 | Pitcher | St. Louis Cardinals, Chicago Cubs | |
| Al Stanek | April 26, 1963 | September 27, 1963 | Pitcher | San Francisco Giants | |
| Kevin Stanfield | September 14, 1979 | September 25, 1979 | Pitcher | Minnesota Twins | |
| Jason Stanford | July 6, 2003 | July 26, 2007 | Pitcher | Cleveland Indians | |
| Daniel Stange | April 29, 2010 | | Pitcher | Arizona Diamondbacks | |
| Lee Stange | April 15, 1961 | September 21, 1970 | Pitcher | Minnesota Twins, Cleveland Indians, Boston Red Sox, Chicago White Sox | |
| Don Stanhouse | April 19, 1972 | September 24, 1982 | Pitcher | Texas Rangers, Montreal Expos, Baltimore Orioles, Los Angeles Dodgers | |
| Pete Stanicek | September 1, 1987 | October 2, 1988 | Outfielder | Baltimore Orioles | |
| Steve Stanicek | September 16, 1987 | October 1, 1989 | Designated hitter | Milwaukee Brewers, Philadelphia Athletics | |
| Rob Stanifer | May 3, 1997 | June 19, 2000 | Pitcher | Florida Marlins, Boston Red Sox | |
| Joe Stanka | September 2, 1959 | September 5, 1959 | Pitcher | Chicago White Sox | |
| Tom Stankard | July 2, 1904 | July 26, 1904 | Utility infielder | Pittsburgh Pirates | |
| Andy Stankiewicz | April 11, 1992 | September 23, 1998 | Utility infielder | New York Yankees, Houston Astros, Montreal Expos, Arizona Diamondbacks | |
| Eddie Stanky | April 21, 1943 | July 25, 1953 | Second baseman | Chicago Cubs, Brooklyn Dodgers, Boston Braves, New York Giants, St. Louis Cardinals | |
| Bob Stanley | April 16, 1977 | September 5, 1989 | Pitcher | Boston Red Sox | |
| Buck Stanley | September 12, 1911 | October 9, 1911 | Pitcher | Philadelphia Phillies | |
| Fred Stanley | September 11, 1969 | October 1, 1982 | Shortstop | Seattle Pilots, Milwaukee Brewers, Cleveland Indians, San Diego Padres, New York Yankees, Oakland Athletics | |
| Jim Stanley | April 19, 1914 | September 29, 1914 | Shortstop | Chicago Chi-Feds | |
| Joe Stanley (1880s OF) | April 24, 1884 | June 18, 1884 | Outfielder | Baltimore Monumentals | |
| Joe Stanley (1900s OF) | September 11, 1897 | September 26, 1909 | Outfielder | Washington Senators (1891–99), Washington Senators, Boston Beaneaters, Chicago Cubs | |
| Mickey Stanley | September 13, 1964 | September 28, 1978 | Outfielder | Detroit Tigers | |
| Mike Stanley | June 24, 1986 | September 29, 2000 | Catcher | Texas Rangers, New York Yankees, Boston Red Sox | |
| Craig Stansberry | August 25, 2007 | | Second baseman | San Diego Padres | |
| Jack Stansbury | June 30, 1918 | July 28, 1918 | Third baseman | Boston Red Sox | |
| Buck Stanton | September 5, 1931 | September 26, 1931 | Outfielder | St. Louis Browns | |
| Leroy Stanton | September 10, 1970 | September 30, 1978 | Outfielder | New York Mets, California Angels, Seattle Mariners | |
| Mike Stanton (RHP) | July 9, 1975 | August 8, 1985 | Pitcher | Houston Astros, Cleveland Indians, Seattle Mariners, Chicago White Sox | |
| Mike Stanton (LHP) | August 24, 1989 | September 30, 2007 | Pitcher | Atlanta Braves, Boston Red Sox, Texas Rangers, New York Yankees, New York Mets, Washington Nationals, San Francisco Giants, Cincinnati Reds | |
| Mike Stanton (OF) | June 8, 2010 | | Outfielder | Florida Marlins | |
| Tom Stanton | April 19, 1904 | April 19, 1904 | Catcher | Chicago Cubs | |
| Dave Stapleton (1B) | May 30, 1980 | October 5, 1986 | First baseman | Boston Red Sox | |
| Dave Stapleton (P) | September 14, 1987 | May 10, 1988 | Pitcher | Milwaukee Brewers | |
| Willie Stargell β | September 16, 1962 | October 3, 1982 | Outfielder | Pittsburgh Pirates | |
| Denny Stark | September 15, 1999 | July 19, 2004 | Pitcher | Seattle Mariners, Colorado Rockies | |
| Dolly Stark | September 12, 1909 | May 24, 1912 | Outfielder | Cleveland Naps, Brooklyn Superbas/Dodgers | |
| Matt Stark | April 8, 1987 | September 29, 1990 | Designated hitter | Toronto Blue Jays, Chicago White Sox | |
| Con Starkel | April 19, 1906 | April 19, 1906 | Pitcher | Washington Senators | |
| George Starnagle | September 14, 1902 | September 14, 1902 | Catcher | Cleveland Bronchos | |
| Bill Starr | August 23, 1935 | June 20, 1936 | Catcher | Washington Senators | |
| Charlie Starr | April 29, 1905 | August 19, 1909 | Second baseman | St. Louis Browns, Pittsburgh Pirates, Boston Braves, Philadelphia Phillies | |
| Dick Starr | September 5, 1947 | September 29, 1951 | Pitcher | New York Yankees, St. Louis Browns, Washington Senators | |
| Ray Starr | September 11, 1932 | September 26, 1945 | Pitcher | St. Louis Cardinals, New York Giants, Boston Braves, Cincinnati Reds, Pittsburgh Pirates, Chicago Cubs | |
| Herm Starrette | July 1, 1963 | May 10, 1965 | Pitcher | Baltimore Orioles | |
| Joe Start | May 18, 1871 | July 9, 1886 | First baseman | New York Mutuals, Hartford Dark Blues, Chicago White Stockings, Providence Grays, Washington Nationals (1886–1889) | |
| Dave Staton | September 8, 1993 | May 19, 1994 | First baseman | San Diego Padres | |
| Joe Staton | September 5, 1972 | September 30, 1973 | First baseman | Detroit Tigers | |
| Jigger Statz | July 30, 1919 | September 30, 1928 | Outfielder | New York Giants, Boston Red Sox, Chicago Cubs, Brooklyn Robins | |
| Rusty Staub | April 9, 1963 | October 6, 1985 | Outfielder | Houston Astros, Montreal Expos, New York Mets, Detroit Tigers, Texas Rangers | |
| Ed Stauffer | April 26, 1923 | October 4, 1925 | Pitcher | Chicago Cubs, St. Louis Browns | |
| Tim Stauffer | May 11, 2005 | | Pitcher | San Diego Padres | |
| Nick Stavinoha | June 22, 2008 | | Outfielder | St. Louis Cardinals | |
| Bill Stearns | June 26, 1871 | June 12, 1875 | Pitcher | Washington Olympics, Washington Nationals (NA), Washington Blue Legs, Hartford Dark Blues | |
| Dan Stearns | August 17, 1880 | October 14, 1889 | First baseman | Buffalo Bisons (NL), Detroit Wolverines, Cincinnati Red Stockings, Baltimore Orioles (19th century), Kansas City Cowboys (AA) | |
| John Stearns | September 22, 1974 | September 30, 1984 | Catcher | Philadelphia Phillies, New York Mets | |
| William Stecher | September 6, 1890 | October 9, 1890 | Pitcher | Philadelphia Athletics (AA) | |
| Gene Stechschulte | April 20, 2000 | June 30, 2002 | Pitcher | St. Louis Cardinals | |
| John Stedronsky | September 25, 1879 | September 30, 1879 | Third baseman | Chicago White Stockings | |
| Bill Steele | September 10, 1910 | October 1, 1914 | Pitcher | St. Louis Cardinals, Brooklyn Robins | |
| Bob Steele | April 17, 1916 | April 24, 1919 | Pitcher | St. Louis Cardinals, Pittsburgh Pirates, New York Giants | |
| Elmer Steele | September 12, 1907 | October 9, 1911 | Pitcher | Boston Americans/Red Sox, Pittsburgh Pirates, Brooklyn Dodgers | |
| Farmer Steelman | September 15, 1899 | May 22, 1902 | Catcher | Louisville Colonels, Brooklyn Superbas, Philadelphia Athletics | |
| Jim Steels | April 6, 1987 | May 19, 1989 | Outfielder | San Diego Padres, Texas Rangers, San Francisco Giants | |
| Bill Steen | April 15, 1912 | August 22, 1915 | Pitcher | Cleveland Naps/Indians, Detroit Tigers | |
| Milt Steengrafe | May 5, 1924 | August 29, 1926 | Pitcher | Chicago White Sox | |
| Kennie Steenstra | May 21, 1998 | June 7, 1998 | Pitcher | Chicago Cubs | |
| Gene Steere | August 29, 1894 | September 15, 1894 | Shortstop | Pittsburgh Pirates | |
| Morrie Steevens | April 13, 1962 | September 18, 1965 | Pitcher | Chicago Cubs, Philadelphia Phillies | |
| John Stefero | June 24, 1983 | May 24, 1987 | Catcher | Baltimore Orioles, Montreal Expos | |
| Dave Stegman | September 4, 1978 | July 22, 1984 | Outfielder | Detroit Tigers, New York Yankees, Chicago White Sox | |
| Bill Stein | September 6, 1972 | October 6, 1985 | Third baseman | St. Louis Cardinals, Chicago White Sox, Seattle Mariners, Texas Rangers | |
| Blake Stein | May 10, 1998 | September 8, 2002 | Pitcher | Oakland Athletics, Kansas City Royals | |
| Ed Stein | July 24, 1890 | June 27, 1898 | Pitcher | Chicago Colts, Brooklyn Grooms/Bridegrooms | |
| Henry Stein | October 14, 1900 | October 14, 1900 | Catcher | St. Louis Cardinals | |
| Irv Stein | July 7, 1932 | July 7, 1932 | Pitcher | Philadelphia Athletics | |
| Justin Stein | May 28, 1938 | July 17, 1938 | Utility infielder | Philadelphia Phillies, Cincinnati Reds | |
| Randy Stein | April 17, 1978 | September 22, 1982 | Pitcher | Milwaukee Brewers, Seattle Mariners, Chicago Cubs | |
| Terry Steinbach | September 12, 1986 | October 1, 1999 | Catcher | Oakland Athletics, Minnesota Twins | |
| Hank Steinbacher | April 21, 1937 | October 1, 1939 | Outfielder | Chicago White Sox | |
| Gene Steinbrenner | April 25, 1912 | May 11, 1912 | Second baseman | Philadelphia Phillies | |
| Bill Steinecke | September 16, 1931 | September 24, 1931 | Catcher | Pittsburgh Pirates | |
| Ray Steineder | July 16, 1923 | July 6, 1924 | Pitcher | Pittsburgh Pirates, Philadelphia Phillies | |
| Ben Steiner | April 17, 1945 | April 21, 1947 | Second baseman | Boston Red Sox | |
| Red Steiner | May 11, 1945 | September 29, 1945 | Catcher | Cleveland Indians, Boston Red Sox | |
| Harry Steinfeldt | April 22, 1898 | July 1, 1911 | Third baseman | Cincinnati Reds, Chicago Cubs, Boston Rustlers | |
| Rick Steirer | August 5, 1982 | September 24, 1984 | Pitcher | California Angels | |
| Bill Stellbauer | April 12, 1916 | June 16, 1916 | Outfielder | Philadelphia Athletics | |
| Bill Stellberger | October 1, 1885 | October 1, 1885 | Pitcher | Providence Grays | |
| Rick Stelmaszek | June 25, 1971 | September 25, 1974 | Catcher | Washington Senators (1961–1971), Texas Rangers, California Angels, Chicago Cubs | |
| Fred Stem | September 15, 1908 | August 15, 1909 | First baseman | Boston Doves | |
| Jeff Stember | August 5, 1980 | August 5, 1980 | Pitcher | San Francisco Giants | |
| Steve Stemle | May 26, 2005 | April 16, 2006 | Pitcher | Kansas City Royals | |
| Bill Stemmyer | October 3, 1885 | June 15, 1888 | Pitcher | Boston Beaneaters, Cleveland Blues | |
| Casey Stengel β | September 17, 1912 | May 19, 1925 | Outfielder | Brooklyn Dodgers/Robins, Pittsburgh Pirates, Philadelphia Phillies, New York Giants, Boston Braves | |
| Dave Stenhouse | April 18, 1962 | October 4, 1964 | Pitcher | Washington Senators (1961–1971) | |
| Mike Stenhouse | October 3, 1982 | July 23, 1986 | Outfielder | Montreal Expos, Minnesota Twins, Boston Red Sox | |
| Rennie Stennett | July 10, 1971 | August 24, 1981 | Second baseman | Pittsburgh Pirates, San Francisco Giants | |
| Dernell Stenson | August 13, 2003 | September 28, 2003 | Outfielder | Cincinnati Reds | |
| Jake Stenzel | June 16, 1890 | July 23, 1899 | Outfielder | Chicago Colts, Pittsburgh Pirates, Baltimore Orioles (19th century), St. Louis Browns (NL)/Perfectos, Cincinnati Reds | |
| Buzz Stephen | September 20, 1968 | September 25, 1968 | Pitcher | Minnesota Twins | |
| Ben Stephens | August 5, 1982 | May 4, 1894 | Pitcher | Cincinnati Reds, Baltimore Orioles (19th century), Washington Senators (1891–99) | |
| Bryan Stephens | May 15, 1947 | September 26, 1948 | Pitcher | Cleveland Indians, St. Louis Browns | |
| Clarence Stephens | October 8, 1886 | September 23, 1891 | Pitcher | Cincinnati Red Stockings/Reds | |
| Gene Stephens | April 16, 1952 | September 23, 1964 | Outfielder | Boston Red Sox, Baltimore Orioles, Kansas City Athletics, Chicago White Sox | |
| Jim Stephens | April 11, 1907 | October 6, 1912 | Catcher | St. Louis Browns | |
| John Stephens | July 30, 2002 | September 29, 2002 | Pitcher | Baltimore Orioles | |
| Ray Stephens | September 20, 1990 | October 3, 1992 | Catcher | St. Louis Cardinals, Texas Rangers | |
| Vern Stephens | September 13, 1941 | June 30, 1955 | Shortstop | St. Louis Browns, Boston Red Sox, Chicago White Sox, Baltimore Orioles | |
| Bob Stephenson | April 14, 1955 | September 18, 1955 | Shortstop | St. Louis Cardinals | |
| Dummy Stephenson | September 9, 1892 | September 16, 1892 | Outfielder | Philadelphia Phillies | |
| Earl Stephenson | April 7, 1971 | July 26, 1978 | Pitcher | Chicago Cubs, Milwaukee Brewers, Baltimore Orioles | |
| Garrett Stephenson | July 25, 1996 | September 27, 2003 | Pitcher | Baltimore Orioles, Philadelphia Phillies, St. Louis Cardinals | |
| Jerry Stephenson | April 14, 1963 | September 21, 1970 | Pitcher | Boston Red Sox, Seattle Pilots, Los Angeles Dodgers | |
| Joe Stephenson | September 19, 1943 | July 11, 1947 | Catcher | New York Giants, Chicago Cubs, Chicago White Sox | |
| John Stephenson | April 14, 1964 | September 29, 1973 | Catcher | New York Mets, Chicago Cubs, San Francisco Giants, California Angels | |
| Phil Stephenson | April 5, 1989 | October 4, 1992 | First baseman | Chicago Cubs, San Diego Padres | |
| Riggs Stephenson | April 13, 1921 | September 24, 1934 | Outfielder | Cleveland Indians, Chicago Cubs | |
| Walter Stephenson | April 29, 1935 | September 30, 1937 | Catcher | Chicago Cubs, Philadelphia Phillies | |
| John Sterling | October 12, 1890 | October 12, 1890 | Pitcher | Philadelphia Athletics (AA) | |
| Randy Sterling | September 16, 1974 | September 28, 1974 | Pitcher | New York Mets | |
| Adam Stern | July 7, 2005 | | Outfielder | Boston Red Sox, Baltimore Orioles, Milwaukee Brewers | |
| Dutch Sterrett | June 20, 1912 | June 17, 1913 | Outfielder | New York Highlanders/Yankees | |
| Mitch Stetter | September 1, 2007 | | Pitcher | Milwaukee Brewers | |
| Bobby Stevens | July 3, 1931 | August 5, 1931 | Shortstop | Philadelphia Phillies | |
| Chuck Stevens | September 16, 1941 | July 25, 1948 | First baseman | St. Louis Browns | |
| Dave Stevens | May 20, 1994 | July 6, 2000 | Pitcher | Minnesota Twins, Chicago Cubs, Cleveland Indians, Atlanta Braves | |
| Ed Stevens | August 9, 1945 | October 1, 1950 | First baseman | Brooklyn Dodgers, Pittsburgh Pirates | |
| Jeff Stevens | July 10, 2009 | | Pitcher | Chicago Cubs | |
| Jim Stevens | August 24, 1914 | September 8, 1914 | Pitcher | Washington Senators | |
| Lee Stevens | July 16, 1990 | September 27, 2002 | First baseman | California Angels, Texas Rangers, Montreal Expos, Cleveland Indians | |
| R. C. Stevens | April 15, 1958 | June 10, 1961 | First baseman | Pittsburgh Pirates, Washington Senators (1961–1971) | |
| Robert Stevens | May 4, 1875 | May 4, 1875 | Outfielder | Washington Nationals (NA) | |
| Todd Steverson | April 28, 1995 | April 3, 1996 | Outfielder | Detroit Tigers, San Diego Padres | |
| Ace Stewart | April 18, 1895 | August 17, 1895 | Second baseman | Chicago Cubs | |
| Andy Stewart | September 6, 1997 | September 28, 1997 | Catcher | Kansas City Royals | |
| Bill Stewart | April 17, 1955 | September 25, 1955 | Outfielder | Kansas City Athletics | |
| Bud Stewart | April 19, 1941 | June 2, 1954 | Outfielder | Pittsburgh Pirates, New York Yankees, Washington Senators, Chicago White Sox | |
| Bunky Stewart | May 4, 1952 | September 15, 1956 | Pitcher | Washington Senators | |
| Chris Stewart | September 6, 2006 | | Catcher | Chicago White Sox, Texas Rangers, New York Yankees, San Diego Padres, San Francisco Giants | |
| Dave Stewart | September 22, 1978 | July 17, 1995 | Pitcher | Los Angeles Dodgers, Texas Rangers, Philadelphia Phillies, Oakland Athletics, Toronto Blue Jays | |
| Frank Stewart | October 2, 1927 | October 2, 1927 | Pitcher | Chicago White Sox | |
| Glen Stewart | June 26, 1940 | October 1, 1944 | Utility infielder | New York Giants, Philadelphia Phillies | |
| Ian Stewart | August 11, 2007 | | Third baseman | Colorado Rockies | |
| Jimmy Stewart | September 3, 1963 | September 29, 1973 | Utility players | Chicago Cubs, Chicago White Sox, Cincinnati Reds, Houston Astros | |
| Joe Stewart | June 9, 1904 | June 11, 1904 | Pitcher | Boston Beaneaters | |
| Josh Stewart | April 6, 2003 | August 26, 2004 | Pitcher | Chicago White Sox | |
| Lefty Stewart | April 20, 1921 | September 29, 1935 | Pitcher | Detroit Tigers, St. Louis Browns, Washington Senators, Cleveland Indians | |
| Mack Stewart | July 7, 1944 | June 22, 1945 | Pitcher | Chicago Cubs | |
| Mark Stewart | October 4, 1913 | October 4, 1913 | Catcher | Cincinnati Reds | |
| Neb Stewart | September 8, 1940 | September 29, 1940 | Outfielder | Philadelphia Phillies | |
| Sammy Stewart | September 1, 1978 | October 3, 1987 | Pitcher | Baltimore Orioles, Boston Red Sox, Cleveland Indians | |
| Scott Stewart | April 5, 2001 | October 3, 2004 | Pitcher | Montreal Expos, Cleveland Indians, Los Angeles Dodgers | |
| Shannon Stewart | September 2, 1995 | June 7, 2008 | Outfielder | Toronto Blue Jays, Minnesota Twins, Oakland Athletics | |
| Stuffy Stewart | September 3, 1916 | June 29, 1929 | Second baseman | St. Louis Cardinals, Pittsburgh Pirates, Brooklyn Robins, Washington Senators | |
| Tuffy Stewart | August 8, 1913 | April 25, 1914 | Outfielder | Chicago Cubs | |
| Zach Stewart | June 16, 2011 | | Pitcher | Toronto Blue Jays, Chicago White Sox | |
| Phil Stidham | June 4, 1994 | June 15, 1994 | Pitcher | Detroit Tigers | |
| Dave Stieb | June 29, 1979 | September 25, 1998 | Pitcher | Toronto Blue Jays, Chicago White Sox | |
| Fred Stiely | October 6, 1929 | June 13, 1931 | Pitcher | St. Louis Browns | |
| Dick Stigman | April 22, 1960 | September 10, 1966 | Pitcher | Cleveland Indians, Minnesota Twins, Boston Red Sox | |
| Rollie Stiles | June 19, 1930 | October 1, 1933 | Pitcher | St. Louis Browns | |
| Royle Stillman | June 22, 1975 | October 2, 1977 | Outfielder | Baltimore Orioles, Chicago White Sox | |
| Kurt Stillwell | April 13, 1986 | September 29, 1996 | Shortstop | Cincinnati Reds, Kansas City Royals, San Diego Padres, California Angels, Texas Rangers | |
| Ron Stillwell | July 3, 1961 | September 30, 1962 | Utility infielder | Washington Senators (1961–1971) | |
| Craig Stimac | August 12, 1980 | May 18, 1981 | Catcher | San Diego Padres | |
| Archie Stimmel | July 3, 1900 | May 9, 1902 | Pitcher | Cincinnati Reds | |
| Carl Stimson | June 6, 1923 | July 7, 1923 | Pitcher | Boston Red Sox | |
| Harry Stine | July 22, 1890 | July 22, 1890 | Pitcher | Philadelphia Athletics (AA) | |
| Lee Stine | April 17, 1934 | May 13, 1938 | Pitcher | Chicago White Sox, Cincinnati Reds, New York Yankees | |
| Kelly Stinnett | April 5, 1994 | September 30, 2007 | Catcher | New York Mets, Milwaukee Brewers, Arizona Diamondbacks, Cincinnati Reds, Philadelphia Phillies, Kansas City Royals, New York Yankees, St. Louis Cardinals | |
| Bob Stinson | September 23, 1969 | August 1, 1980 | Catcher | Los Angeles Dodgers, St. Louis Cardinals, Houston Astros, Montreal Expos, Kansas City Royals, Seattle Mariners | |
| Josh Stinson | September 2, 2011 | | Pitcher | New York Mets | |
| Gat Stires | May 6, 1871 | September 15, 1871 | Outfielder | Rockford Forest Citys | |
| Snuffy Stirnweiss | April 22, 1943 | May 3, 1952 | Second baseman | New York Yankees, St. Louis Browns, Cleveland Indians | |
| Jack Stivetts | June 26, 1889 | June 12, 1899 | Pitcher | St. Louis Browns (AA), Boston Beaneaters, Cleveland Spiders | |
| Chuck Stobbs | September 15, 1947 | August 12, 1961 | Pitcher | Boston Red Sox, Chicago White Sox, Washington Senators, St. Louis Cardinals, Minnesota Twins | |
| Milt Stock | September 29, 1913 | April 16, 1926 | Third baseman | New York Giants, Philadelphia Phillies, St. Louis Cardinals, Brooklyn Robins | |
| Wes Stock | April 19, 1959 | May 7, 1967 | Pitcher | Baltimore Orioles, Kansas City Athletics | |
| Kevin Stocker | July 7, 1993 | September 29, 2000 | Shortstop | Philadelphia Phillies, Tampa Bay Devil Rays, Anaheim Angels | |
| Mel Stocker | September 1, 2007 | | Outfielder | Milwaukee Brewers | |
| Phil Stockman | June 15, 2006 | | Pitcher | Atlanta Braves | |
| Otis Stocksdale | July 24, 1893 | May 2, 1896 | Pitcher | Washington Senators (1891–99), Boston Beaneaters, Baltimore Orioles (19th century) | |
| Len Stockwell | May 17, 1879 | May 19, 1890 | Outfielder | Cleveland Blues (NL), Louisville Eclipse, Cleveland Spiders | |
| Stoddard, first name unknown | September 25, 1875 | October 9, 1875 | Outfielder | Brooklyn Atlantics | |
| Bob Stoddard | September 4, 1981 | September 19, 1987 | Pitcher | Seattle Mariners, Detroit Tigers, San Diego Padres, Kansas City Royals | |
| Tim Stoddard | September 7, 1975 | July 9, 1989 | Pitcher | Chicago White Sox, Baltimore Orioles, Chicago Cubs, San Diego Padres, New York Yankees, Cleveland Indians | |
| Al Stokes | May 10, 1925 | September 17, 1926 | Catcher | Boston Red Sox | |
| Art Stokes | May 5, 1925 | July 9, 1925 | Pitcher | Philadelphia Athletics | |
| Brian Stokes | September 3, 2006 | | Pitcher | Tampa Bay Devil Rays, New York Mets, Los Angeles Angels of Anaheim | |
| Arnie Stone | August 7, 1923 | September 16, 1924 | Pitcher | Pittsburgh Pirates | |
| Dean Stone | September 13, 1953 | June 21, 1963 | Pitcher | Washington Senators, Boston Red Sox, St. Louis Cardinals, Houston Colt .45s, Chicago White Sox, Baltimore Orioles | |
| Dick Stone | August 26, 1945 | September 2, 1945 | Pitcher | Washington Senators | |
| Dwight Stone | April 13, 1913 | September 29, 1914 | Pitcher | St. Louis Browns, Kansas City Packers | |
| Gene Stone | May 13, 1969 | June 28, 1969 | First baseman | Philadelphia Phillies | |
| George Stone (OF) | April 20, 1903 | October 9, 1910 | Outfielder | Boston Americans, St. Louis Browns | |
| George Stone (P) | September 15, 1967 | September 27, 1975 | Pitcher | Atlanta Braves, New York Mets | |
| Jeff Stone | September 9, 1983 | October 2, 1990 | Outfielder | Philadelphia Phillies, Baltimore Orioles, Texas Rangers, Boston Red Sox | |
| John Stone | August 31, 1928 | June 17, 1938 | Outfielder | Detroit Tigers, Washington Senators | |
| Ricky Stone | September 21, 2001 | July 21, 2007 | Pitcher | Houston Astros, San Diego Padres, Cincinnati Reds | |
| Rocky Stone | May 2, 1943 | June 30, 1943 | Pitcher | Cincinnati Reds | |
| Ron Stone | April 13, 1966 | October 2, 1972 | Outfielder | Kansas City Athletics, Philadelphia Phillies | |
| Steve Stone | April 8, 1971 | September 29, 1981 | Pitcher | San Francisco Giants, Chicago White Sox, Chicago Cubs, Baltimore Orioles | |
| Tige Stone | August 23, 1923 | October 7, 1923 | Pitcher | St. Louis Cardinals | |
| John Stoneham | September 18, 1933 | October 1, 1933 | Outfielder | Chicago White Sox | |
| Bill Stoneman | July 16, 1967 | June 30, 1974 | Pitcher | Chicago Cubs, Montreal Expos, California Angels | |
| Lil Stoner | April 15, 1922 | June 10, 1931 | Pitcher | Detroit Tigers, Pittsburgh Pirates, Philadelphia Phillies | |
| Tobi Stoner | September 10, 2009 | | Pitcher | New York Mets | |
| Jim Stoops | September 9, 1998 | September 26, 1998 | Pitcher | Colorado Rockies | |
| Drew Storen | May 17, 2010 | | Pitcher | Washington Nationals | |
| Howie Storie | September 7, 1931 | June 5, 1932 | Catcher | Boston Red Sox | |
| Alan Storke | September 24, 1906 | October 6, 1909 | Utility infielder | Pittsburgh Pirates, St. Louis Cardinals | |
| Lin Storti | September 18, 1930 | September 30, 1933 | Third baseman | St. Louis Browns | |
| Mel Stottlemyre | August 12, 1964 | August 16, 1974 | Pitcher | New York Yankees | |
| Mel Stottlemyre Jr. | July 17, 1990 | September 11, 1990 | Pitcher | Kansas City Royals | |
| Todd Stottlemyre | April 6, 1988 | June 26, 2002 | Pitcher | Toronto Blue Jays, Oakland Athletics, St. Louis Cardinals, Texas Rangers, Arizona Diamondbacks | |
| Tom Stouch | July 7, 1898 | July 27, 1898 | Second baseman | Louisville Colonels | |
| Allyn Stout | May 16, 1931 | June 27, 1943 | Pitcher | St. Louis Cardinals, Cincinnati Reds, New York Giants, Boston Braves | |
| Da Rond Stovall | April 1, 1998 | July 22, 1998 | Outfielder | Montreal Expos | |
| George Stovall | July 4, 1904 | October 3, 1915 | First baseman | Cleveland Naps, St. Louis Browns, Kansas City Packers | |
| Jesse Stovall | August 31, 1903 | October 7, 1904 | Pitcher | Cleveland Naps, Detroit Tigers | |
| Harry Stovey | May 1, 1880 | July 29, 1893 | Outfielder | Worcester Ruby Legs, Philadelphia Athletics (AA), Boston Reds, Boston Beaneaters, Baltimore Orioles (19th century), Brooklyn Grooms | |
| Ray Stoviak | June 5, 1938 | August 7, 1938 | Outfielder | Philadelphia Phillies | |
| Hal Stowe | September 30, 1960 | September 30, 1960 | Pitcher | New York Yankees | |
| Chris Stowers | July 10, 1999 | July 16, 1999 | Outfielder | Montreal Expos | |
| Mike Strahler | September 12, 1970 | September 25, 1973 | Pitcher | Los Angeles Dodgers, Detroit Tigers | |
| Dick Strahs | July 24, 1954 | September 6, 1954 | Pitcher | Chicago White Sox | |
| Joe Strain | June 28, 1979 | June 2, 1981 | Second baseman | San Francisco Giants, Chicago Cubs | |
| Les Straker | April 11, 1987 | October 1, 1988 | Pitcher | Minnesota Twins | |
| Bob Strampe | May 10, 1972 | September 19, 1972 | Pitcher | Detroit Tigers | |
| Paul Strand | May 15, 1913 | June 28, 1924 | Outfielder | Boston Braves, Philadelphia Athletics | |
| Larry Strands | April 25, 1915 | September 7, 1915 | Third baseman | Newark Peppers | |
| Sammy Strang | July 10, 1896 | June 2, 1908 | Catcher | Louisville Colonels, Chicago Orphans, New York Giants, Chicago White Sox, Chicago Cubs, Brooklyn Superbas | |
| Alan Strange | April 17, 1934 | August 16, 1942 | Shortstop | St. Louis Browns, Washington Senators | |
| Doug Strange | July 13, 1989 | September 27, 1998 | Third baseman | Detroit Tigers, Chicago Cubs, Texas Rangers, Seattle Mariners, Montreal Expos, Pittsburgh Pirates | |
| Pat Strange | September 13, 2002 | June 5, 2003 | Pitcher | New York Mets | |
| Stephen Strasburg | June 8, 2010 | | Pitcher | Washington Nationals | |
| Asa Stratton | June 17, 1881 | June 17, 1881 | Shortstop | Worcester Ruby Legs | |
| Ed Stratton | May 14, 1873 | July 11, 1873 | Pitcher | Baltimore Marylands | |
| Monty Stratton | June 2, 1934 | September 27, 1938 | Pitcher | Chicago White Sox | |
| Scott Stratton | April 21, 1888 | July 2, 1895 | Pitcher | Louisville Colonels, Pittsburgh Pirates, Chicago Colts | |
| Joe Straub | June 24, 1880 | September 22, 1883 | Catcher | Troy Trojans, Philadelphia Athletics (AA), Columbus Buckeyes | |
| Joe Strauss | July 27, 1884 | October 6, 1886 | Outfielder | Kansas City Cowboys (UA), Louisville Colonels, Brooklyn Grays | |
| Darryl Strawberry | May 6, 1983 | October 3, 1999 | Outfielder | New York Mets, San Francisco Giants, Los Angeles Dodgers, New York Yankees | |
| Gabby Street | September 13, 1904 | September 20, 1931 | Catcher | Cincinnati Reds, Boston Beaneaters, Washington Senators, New York Yankees, St. Louis Cardinals | |
| Huston Street | April 6, 2005 | | Pitcher | Oakland Athletics, Colorado Rockies | |
| Oscar Streit | April 21, 1899 | June 18, 1902 | Pitcher | Boston Beaneaters, Cleveland Bronchos | |
| Ed Strelecki | April 16, 1928 | September 20, 1931 | Pitcher | St. Louis Browns, Cincinnati Reds | |
| Phil Stremmel | September 16, 1909 | May 29, 1910 | Pitcher | St. Louis Browns | |
| Walt Streuli | September 25, 1954 | May 1, 1956 | Catcher | Detroit Tigers | |
| Charles Strick | May 18, 1882 | September 30, 1882 | Catcher | Louisville Eclipse | |
| Cub Stricker | May 2, 1882 | September 29, 1893 | Second baseman | Philadelphia Athletics (AA), Cleveland Blues (AA), Cleveland Spiders, Cleveland Infants, Boston Reds, St. Louis Browns (NL), Baltimore Orioles (19th century), Washington Senators (1891–99) | |
| Bill Strickland | July 16, 1937 | September 8, 1937 | Pitcher | St. Louis Browns | |
| George Strickland | May 7, 1950 | July 23, 1960 | Shortstop | Pittsburgh Pirates, Cleveland Indians | |
| Jim Strickland | May 19, 1971 | September 28, 1975 | Pitcher | Minnesota Twins, Cleveland Indians | |
| Scott Strickland | August 14, 1999 | | Pitcher | Montreal Expos, New York Mets, Houston Astros, Florida Marlins | |
| Elmer Stricklett | April 22, 1904 | September 24, 1907 | Pitcher | Chicago White Sox, Brooklyn Superbas | |
| George Strief | May 1, 1879 | September 8, 1885 | Second baseman | Cleveland Blues (NL), Pittsburgh Alleghenys, St. Louis Browns (AA), Kansas City Cowboys (UA), Chicago Browns/Pittsburgh Stogies, Philadelphia Athletics (AA) | |
| John Strike | September 24, 1886 | September 30, 1886 | Pitcher | Philadelphia Quakers | |
| Jake Striker | September 25, 1959 | April 24, 1960 | Pitcher | Cleveland Indians, Chicago White Sox | |
| Nick Strincevich | April 23, 1940 | June 11, 1948 | Pitcher | Boston Braves, Pittsburgh Pirates, Philadelphia Phillies | |
| Lou Stringer | April 15, 1941 | September 23, 1950 | Second baseman | Chicago Cubs, Boston Red Sox | |
| Joe Stripp | July 2, 1928 | October 2, 1938 | Third baseman | Cincinnati Reds, Brooklyn Dodgers, St. Louis Cardinals, Boston Braves | |
| Mark Strittmatter | September 3, 1998 | September 25, 1998 | Catcher | Colorado Rockies | |
| Allie Strobel | August 29, 1905 | August 11, 1906 | Second baseman | Boston Beaneaters | |
| John Strohmayer | April 29, 1970 | September 14, 1974 | Pitcher | Montreal Expos, New York Mets | |
| Brent Strom | July 31, 1972 | May 17, 1977 | Pitcher | New York Mets, Cleveland Indians, San Diego Padres | |
| Floyd Stromme | July 5, 1939 | September 19, 1939 | Pitcher | Cleveland Indians | |
| Jim Stroner | May 1, 1929 | May 31, 1929 | Third baseman | Pittsburgh Pirates | |
| Jamal Strong | September 2, 2003 | September 11, 2005 | Outfielder | Seattle Mariners | |
| Joe Strong | May 11, 2000 | May 5, 2001 | Pitcher | Florida Marlins | |
| Pedro Strop | August 28, 2009 | | Pitcher | Texas Rangers, Baltimore Orioles | |
| Ed Stroud | September 11, 1966 | June 29, 1971 | Outfielder | Chicago White Sox, Washington Senators (1961–1971) | |
| Sailor Stroud | April 29, 1910 | June 13, 1916 | Pitcher | Detroit Tigers, New York Giants | |
| Steve Stroughter | April 7, 1982 | July 24, 1982 | Designated hitter | Seattle Mariners | |
| Amos Strunk | September 24, 1908 | June 28, 1924 | Outfielder | Philadelphia Athletics, Boston Red Sox, Chicago White Sox | |
| Steamboat Struss | September 30, 1934 | September 30, 1934 | Pitcher | Pittsburgh Pirates | |
| Al Strueve | June 22, 1884 | June 24, 1884 | Utility player | St. Louis Browns (AA) | |
| Dutch Stryker | April 16, 1924 | April 22, 1926 | Pitcher | Boston Braves, Brooklyn Robins | |
| Bill Stuart | August 15, 1895 | September 7, 1899 | Shortstop | Pittsburgh Pirates, New York Giants | |
| Dick Stuart | July 10, 1958 | May 27, 1969 | First baseman | Pittsburgh Pirates, Boston Red Sox, Philadelphia Phillies, New York Mets, Los Angeles Dodgers, California Angels | |
| Johnny Stuart | July 27, 1922 | October 2, 1925 | Pitcher | St. Louis Cardinals | |
| Luke Stuart | July 28, 1921 | August 9, 1921 | Second baseman | St. Louis Browns | |
| Marlin Stuart | April 26, 1949 | August 8, 1954 | Pitcher | Detroit Tigers, St. Louis Browns, Baltimore Orioles, New York Yankees | |
| Drew Stubbs | August 19, 2009 | | Outfielder | Cincinnati Reds | |
| Franklin Stubbs | April 28, 1984 | September 29, 1995 | First baseman | Los Angeles Dodgers, Houston Astros, Milwaukee Brewers, Detroit Tigers | |
| Moose Stubing | August 14, 1967 | August 29, 1967 | Pinch hitter | California Angels | |
| Sy Studley | April 20, 1872 | May 8, 1872 | Outfielder | Washington Nationals (NA) | |
| George Stueland | September 15, 1921 | May 26, 1925 | Pitcher | Chicago Cubs | |
| Paul Stuffel | September 16, 1950 | May 24, 1953 | Pitcher | Philadelphia Phillies | |
| Everett Stull | April 14, 1997 | May 15, 2002 | Pitcher | Montreal Expos, Atlanta Braves, Milwaukee Brewers | |
| Eric Stults | September 5, 2006 | | Pitcher | Los Angeles Dodgers, Colorado Rockies | |
| George Stultz | September 22, 1894 | September 22, 1894 | Pitcher | Boston Beaneaters | |
| Jim Stump | August 29, 1957 | September 26, 1959 | Pitcher | Detroit Tigers | |
| Bill Stumpf | May 11, 1912 | May 21, 1913 | Shortstop | New York Highlanders/Yankees | |
| George Stumpf | September 19, 1931 | May 6, 1936 | Outfielder | Boston Red Sox, Chicago White Sox | |
| John Stuper | June 1, 1982 | October 4, 1985 | Pitcher | St. Louis Cardinals, Cincinnati Reds | |
| Tom Sturdivant | April 14, 1955 | June 21, 1964 | Pitcher | New York Yankees, Kansas City Athletics, Boston Red Sox, Washington Senators (1961–1971), Pittsburgh Pirates, Detroit Tigers, New York Mets | |
| Guy Sturdy | September 30, 1927 | August 21, 1928 | First baseman | St. Louis Browns | |
| Bobby Sturgeon | April 16, 1940 | October 3, 1948 | Shortstop | Chicago Cubs, Boston Braves | |
| Dean Sturgis | May 1, 1914 | June 29, 1914 | Catcher | Philadelphia Athletics | |
| Johnny Sturm | April 14, 1941 | September 28, 1941 | First baseman | New York Yankees | |
| Tanyon Sturtze | May 3, 1995 | | Pitcher | Chicago Cubs, Texas Rangers, Chicago White Sox, Toronto Blue Jays, Tampa Bay Devil Rays, New York Yankees, Los Angeles Dodgers | |
| Michael Stutes | April 25, 2011 | | Pitcher | Philadelphia Phillies | |
| George Stutz | August 17, 1926 | August 28, 1926 | Shortstop | Philadelphia Phillies | |
| Lena Styles | September 10, 1919 | September 27, 1931 | Catcher | Philadelphia Athletics, Cincinnati Reds | |
| Chris Stynes | May 19, 1995 | July 30, 2004 | Third baseman | Kansas City Royals, Cincinnati Reds, Boston Red Sox, Chicago Cubs, Colorado Rockies, Pittsburgh Pirates | |
| Neil Stynes | September 8, 1890 | September 9, 1890 | Catcher | Cleveland Infants | |
| Ken Suarez | April 14, 1966 | September 22, 1973 | Catcher | Kansas City Athletics, Cleveland Indians, Texas Rangers | |
| Luis Suárez | May 28, 1944 | May 28, 1944 | Third baseman | Washington Senators | |
| Dick Such | April 6, 1970 | July 17, 1970 | Pitcher | Washington Senators (1961–1971) | |
| Charley Suche | September 18, 1938 | September 18, 1938 | Pitcher | Cleveland Indians | |
| Jim Suchecki | May 20, 1950 | May 1, 1952 | Pitcher | Boston Red Sox, St. Louis Browns, Pittsburgh Pirates | |
| Tony Suck | August 9, 1883 | October 15, 1884 | Catcher | Buffalo Bisons (NL), Chicago Browns/Pittsburgh Stogies, Baltimore Monumentals | |
| Bill Sudakis | September 3, 1968 | August 7, 1975 | Third baseman | Los Angeles Dodgers, New York Mets, Texas Rangers, New York Yankees, California Angels, Cleveland Indians | |
| Pete Suder | April 15, 1941 | May 30, 1955 | Second baseman | Philadelphia/Kansas City Athletics | |
| Willie Sudhoff | August 20, 1897 | June 16, 1906 | Pitcher | St. Louis Browns (NL), Cleveland Spiders, St. Louis Perfectos/Cardinals, St. Louis Browns, Washington Senators | |
| William Suero | April 9, 1992 | July 19, 1993 | Second baseman | Milwaukee Brewers | |
| Joe Sugden | July 20, 1893 | May 18, 1912 | Catcher | Pittsburgh Pirates, St. Louis Browns (NL), Cleveland Spiders, Chicago White Sox, St. Louis Browns, Detroit Tigers | |
| George Suggs | April 21, 1908 | September 18, 1915 | Pitcher | Detroit Tigers, Cincinnati Reds, Baltimore Terrapins | |
| Gus Suhr | April 15, 1930 | May 12, 1940 | First baseman | Pittsburgh Pirates, Philadelphia Phillies | |
| Clyde Sukeforth | May 23, 1926 | June 7, 1945 | Catcher | Cincinnati Reds, Brooklyn Dodgers | |
| Ed Sukla | September 17, 1964 | May 22, 1966 | Pitcher | Los Angeles/California Angels | |
| Guy Sularz | September 2, 1980 | October 2, 1983 | Utility infielder | San Francisco Giants | |
| Ernie Sulik | April 15, 1936 | September 27, 1936 | Outfielder | Philadelphia Phillies | |
| Sullivan, first name unknown | May 15, 1875 | May 17, 1875 | Outfielder | New Haven Elm Citys | |
| Andy Sullivan | September 13, 1904 | September 13, 1904 | Shortstop | Boston Beaneaters | |
| Bill Sullivan (OF) | August 9, 1878 | August 10, 1878 | Outfielder | Chicago White Stockings | |
| Bill Sullivan (P) | April 19, 1890 | June 23, 1890 | Pitcher | Syracuse Stars (AA) | |
| Billy Sullivan | September 13, 1899 | April 15, 1916 | Catcher | Boston Beaneaters, Chicago White Stockings (AL), Detroit Tigers | |
| Billy Sullivan Jr. | June 9, 1931 | September 3, 1947 | Catcher | Chicago White Sox, Cincinnati Reds, Cleveland Indians, St. Louis Browns, Detroit Tigers, Brooklyn Dodgers, Pittsburgh Pirates | |
| Charlie Sullivan | April 21, 1928 | September 22, 1931 | Pitcher | Detroit Tigers | |
| Chub Sullivan | September 24, 1877 | July 17, 1880 | First baseman | Cincinnati Reds (1876–1880), Worcester Ruby Legs | |
| Cory Sullivan | April 4, 2005 | | Outfielder | Colorado Rockies, New York Mets, Houston Astros | |
| Dan Sullivan | May 2, 1882 | April 18, 1886 | Catcher | Louisville Eclipse/Colonels, St. Louis Browns (AA), Pittsburgh Alleghenys | |
| Denny Sullivan (3B) | August 25, 1879 | September 25, 1880 | Third baseman | Providence Grays, Boston Red Caps | |
| Denny Sullivan (OF) | April 22, 1905 | September 2, 1909 | Outfielder | Washington Senators, Boston Americans/Red Sox, Cleveland Naps | |
| Fleury Sullivan | May 3, 1884 | October 15, 1884 | Pitcher | Pittsburgh Alleghenys | |
| Frank Sullivan | July 31, 1953 | June 12, 1963 | Pitcher | Boston Red Sox, Philadelphia Phillies, Minnesota Twins | |
| Harry Sullivan | August 11, 1909 | September 23, 1909 | Pitcher | St. Louis Cardinals | |
| Haywood Sullivan | September 20, 1955 | June 30, 1963 | Catcher | Boston Red Sox, Kansas City Athletics | |
| Jackie Sullivan | July 6, 1944 | July 6, 1944 | Second baseman | Detroit Tigers | |
| Jim Sullivan (1890s P) | April 22, 1891 | May 6, 1898 | Pitcher | Boston Beaneaters, Columbus Solons | |
| Jim Sullivan (1920s P) | September 27, 1921 | September 28, 1923 | Pitcher | Philadelphia Athletics, Cleveland Indians | |
| Joe Sullivan (SS) | April 27, 1893 | September 26, 1896 | Shortstop | Washington Senators (1891–99), Philadelphia Phillies, St. Louis Browns (NL) | |
| Joe Sullivan (P) | April 20, 1935 | September 23, 1941 | Pitcher | Detroit Tigers, Boston Braves, Pittsburgh Pirates | |
| John Sullivan (1900s C) | April 19, 1905 | September 5, 1908 | Catcher | Detroit Tigers, Pittsburgh Pirates | |
| John Sullivan (P) | July 18, 1919 | September 26, 1919 | Pitcher | Chicago White Sox | |
| John Sullivan (OF) | April 18, 1920 | October 2, 1921 | Outfielder | Boston Braves, Chicago Cubs | |
| John Sullivan (SS) | June 7, 1942 | October 2, 1949 | Shortstop | Washington Senators, St. Louis Browns | |
| John Sullivan (1960s C) | September 20, 1963 | August 7, 1968 | Catcher | Detroit Tigers, New York Mets, Philadelphia Phillies | |
| Lefty Sullivan | May 6, 1939 | August 3, 1939 | Pitcher | Cleveland Indians | |
| Marc Sullivan | October 1, 1982 | October 3, 1987 | Catcher | Boston Red Sox | |
| Marty Sullivan | April 30, 1887 | August 17, 1891 | Outfielder | Chicago White Sox, Indianapolis Hoosiers (NL) | |
| Mike Sullivan (OF) | April 26, 1888 | June 20, 1888 | Outfielder | Philadelphia Athletics (AA) | |
| Mike Sullivan (P) | June 17, 1889 | October 12, 1899 | Pitcher | Washington Nationals (1886–1889), Chicago Colts, Philadelphia Athletics (AA 1891), New York Giants, Cincinnati Reds, Washington Senators (1891–99), Cleveland Spiders, Boston Beaneaters | |
| Pat Sullivan | August 30, 1884 | October 19, 1884 | Third baseman | Kansas City Cowboys (UA) | |
| Russ Sullivan | September 8, 1951 | May 16, 1953 | Outfielder | Detroit Tigers | |
| Scott Sullivan | May 6, 1995 | August 25, 2004 | Pitcher | Cincinnati Reds, Chicago White Sox, Kansas City Royals | |
| Sleeper Sullivan | May 3, 1881 | May 29, 1884 | Catcher | Buffalo Bisons, St. Louis Brown Stockings (AA), Louisville Eclipse, St. Louis Maroons | |
| Suter Sullivan | July 24, 1898 | October 15, 1899 | Third baseman | St. Louis Browns (NL), Cleveland Spiders | |
| Ted Sullivan | September 9, 1884 | September 12, 1884 | Outfielder | Kansas City Cowboys (UA) | |
| Tom Sullivan (1880s P) | September 27, 1884 | June 23, 1889 | Pitcher | Columbus Buckeyes, Louisville Colonels, Kansas City Cowboys (AA) | |
| Tom Sullivan (1920s P) | May 15, 1922 | May 30, 1922 | Pitcher | Philadelphia Phillies | |
| Tom Sullivan (C) | June 14, 1925 | June 14, 1925 | Catcher | Cincinnati Reds | |
| Homer Summa | September 13, 1920 | September 28, 1930 | Outfielder | Pittsburgh Pirates, Cleveland Indians, Philadelphia Athletics | |
| Champ Summers | May 4, 1974 | September 30, 1984 | Outfielder | Oakland Athletics, Chicago Cubs, Cincinnati Reds, Detroit Tigers, San Francisco Giants, San Diego Padres | |
| Ed Summers | April 16, 1908 | June 1, 1912 | Pitcher | Detroit Tigers | |
| Kid Summers | August 5, 1893 | August 6, 1893 | Utility player | St. Louis Browns (NL) | |
| Carl Sumner | July 28, 1928 | August 21, 1928 | Outfielder | Boston Red Sox | |
| Art Sunday | May 5, 1890 | August 26, 1890 | Outfielder | Brooklyn Ward's Wonders | |
| Billy Sunday | May 22, 1883 | October 4, 1890 | Outfielder | Chicago White Stockings, Pittsburgh Alleghenys, Philadelphia Phillies | |
| Jim Sundberg | April 4, 1974 | September 24, 1989 | Catcher | Texas Rangers, Milwaukee Brewers, Kansas City Royals, Chicago Cubs | |
| Gordie Sundin | September 19, 1956 | September 19, 1956 | Pitcher | Baltimore Orioles | |
| Steve Sundra | April 17, 1936 | May 28, 1946 | Pitcher | New York Yankees, Washington Senators, St. Louis Browns | |
| Tom Sunkel | August 26, 1937 | September 29, 1944 | Pitcher | St. Louis Cardinals, New York Giants, Brooklyn Dodgers | |
| Jeff Suppan | July 17, 1995 | | Pitcher | Boston Red Sox, Arizona Diamondbacks, Kansas City Royals, Pittsburgh Pirates, St. Louis Cardinals, Milwaukee Brewers | |
| B. J. Surhoff | April 8, 1987 | October 2, 2005 | Utility player | Milwaukee Brewers, Baltimore Orioles, Atlanta Braves | |
| Rick Surhoff | September 8, 1985 | October 6, 1985 | Pitcher | Philadelphia Phillies, Texas Rangers | |
| Eric Surkamp | August 27, 2011 | | Pitcher | San Francisco Giants | |
| Max Surkont | April 19, 1949 | May 1, 1957 | Pitcher | Chicago White Sox, Boston/Milwaukee Braves, Pittsburgh Pirates, St. Louis Cardinals, New York Giants | |
| George Susce (C) | April 23, 1929 | October 1, 1944 | Catcher | Philadelphia Phillies, Detroit Tigers, Pittsburgh Pirates, St. Louis Browns, Cleveland Indians | |
| George Susce (P) | April 15, 1955 | May 6, 1959 | Pitcher | Boston Red Sox, Detroit Tigers | |
| Pete Susko | August 1, 1934 | September 30, 1934 | First baseman | Washington Senators | |
| Butch Sutcliffe | August 28, 1938 | September 11, 1938 | Catcher | Boston Bees | |
| Rick Sutcliffe | September 29, 1976 | July 22, 1994 | Pitcher | Los Angeles Dodgers, Cleveland Indians, Chicago Cubs, Baltimore Orioles, St. Louis Cardinals | |
| Sy Sutcliffe | October 2, 1884 | October 6, 1892 | Catcher | Chicago White Stockings, St. Louis Maroons, Detroit Wolverines, Cleveland Spiders, Cleveland Infants, Washington Statesmen, Baltimore Orioles (19th century) | |
| Harry Suter | April 16, 1909 | October 2, 1909 | Pitcher | Chicago White Sox | |
| Darrell Sutherland | June 28, 1964 | April 19, 1968 | Pitcher | New York Mets, Cleveland Indians | |
| Dizzy Sutherland | September 20, 1949 | September 20, 1949 | Pitcher | Washington Senators | |
| Gary Sutherland | September 17, 1966 | May 19, 1978 | Second baseman | Philadelphia Phillies, Montreal Expos, Houston Astros, Detroit Tigers, Milwaukee Brewers, San Diego Padres, St. Louis Cardinals | |
| Leo Sutherland | August 11, 1980 | October 4, 1981 | Outfielder | Chicago White Sox | |
| Suds Sutherland | April 14, 1921 | June 22, 1921 | Pitcher | Detroit Tigers | |
| Glenn Sutko | October 3, 1990 | July 17, 1991 | Catcher | Cincinnati Reds | |
| Bruce Sutter β | May 9, 1976 | September 9, 1988 | Pitcher | Chicago Cubs, St. Louis Cardinals, Atlanta Braves | |
| Jack Sutthoff | September 15, 1898 | August 7, 1905 | Pitcher | Washington Senators (1891–99), St. Louis Perfectos, Cincinnati Reds, Philadelphia Phillies | |
| Don Sutton β | April 14, 1966 | August 8, 1988 | Pitcher | Los Angeles Dodgers, Houston Astros, Milwaukee Brewers, Oakland Athletics, California Angels | |
| Drew Sutton | July 2, 2009 | | Utility player | Cincinnati Reds, Cleveland Indians, Boston Red Sox | |
| Ezra Sutton | May 4, 1871 | June 20, 1888 | Third baseman | Cleveland Forest Citys, Philadelphia Athletics (1860–76), Boston Red Caps/Beaneaters | |
| John Sutton | April 7, 1977 | September 29, 1978 | Pitcher | St. Louis Cardinals, Minnesota Twins | |
| Larry Sutton | August 17, 1997 | June 1, 2004 | Utility player | Kansas City Royals, St. Louis Cardinals, Oakland Athletics, Florida Marlins | |
| Ichiro Suzuki | April 2, 2001 | | Outfielder | Seattle Mariners | |
| Kurt Suzuki | June 12, 2007 | | Catcher | Oakland Athletics | |
| Mac Suzuki | July 7, 1996 | June 28, 2002 | Pitcher | Seattle Mariners, Kansas City Royals, Colorado Rockies, Milwaukee Brewers | |
| Dale Sveum | May 12, 1986 | October 3, 1999 | Shortstop | Milwaukee Brewers, Philadelphia Phillies, Chicago White Sox, Oakland Athletics, Seattle Mariners, Pittsburgh Pirates, New York Yankees | |
| Harry Swacina | September 13, 1907 | August 26, 1915 | First baseman | Pittsburgh Pirates, Baltimore Terrapins | |
| Bill Swaggerty | August 13, 1983 | May 4, 1986 | Pitcher | Baltimore Orioles | |
| Cy Swaim | May 3, 1897 | July 21, 1898 | Pitcher | Washington Nationals (1891–1899) | |
| Andy Swan | July 23, 1884 | October 13, 1884 | First baseman | Washington Nationals (AA), Richmond Virginians | |
| Craig Swan | September 3, 1973 | May 29, 1984 | Pitcher | New York Mets, California Angels | |
| Harry Swan | April 28, 1914 | April 28, 1914 | Pitcher | Kansas City Packers | |
| Russ Swan | August 3, 1989 | April 30, 1994 | Pitcher | San Francisco Giants, Seattle Mariners, Cleveland Indians | |
| Marty Swandell | May 7, 1872 | August 7, 1873 | Third baseman | Brooklyn Eckfords, Elizabeth Resolutes | |
| Pinky Swander | September 18, 1903 | April 14, 1904 | Outfielder | St. Louis Browns | |
| Pedro Swann | September 9, 2000 | September 27, 2003 | Outfielder | Atlanta Braves, Toronto Blue Jays, Baltimore Orioles | |
| Bill Swanson | September 2, 1914 | October 7, 1914 | Second baseman | Boston Red Sox | |
| Evar Swanson | April 18, 1929 | September 30, 1934 | Outfielder | Cincinnati Reds, Chicago White Sox | |
| Karl Swanson | August 12, 1928 | May 5, 1929 | Second baseman | Chicago White sox | |
| Red Swanson | September 10, 1955 | September 21, 1957 | Pitcher | Pittsburgh Pirates | |
| Stan Swanson | June 23, 1971 | September 28, 1971 | Outfielder | Montreal Expos | |
| Bill Swarback | July 9, 1887 | July 12, 1887 | Pitcher | New York Giants | |
| Ed Swartwood | August 11, 1881 | May 21, 1892 | Outfielder | Buffalo Bisons (NL), Pittsburgh Alleghenys, Brooklyn Grays, Toledo Maumees, Pittsburgh Pirates | |
| Bud Swartz | July 12, 1947 | July 27, 1947 | Pitcher | St. Louis Browns | |
| Monty Swartz | October 3, 1920 | October 3, 1920 | Pitcher | Cincinnati Reds | |
| Dave Swartzbaugh | September 3, 1995 | April 22, 1997 | Pitcher | Chicago Cubs | |
| Parke Swartzel | April 17, 1889 | October 14, 1889 | Pitcher | Kansas City Cowboys (AA) | |
| Anthony Swarzak | May 23, 2009 | | Pitcher | Minnesota Twins | |
| Charlie Sweasy | May 19, 1871 | September 30, 1878 | Second baseman | Washington Olympics, Cleveland Forest Citys, Boston Red Stockings, Baltimore Canaries, Brooklyn Atlantics, St. Louis Red Stockings, Cincinnati Reds (1876–1880), Providence Grays | |
| Bill Sweeney (1B) | June 27, 1882 | October 14, 1884 | First baseman | Philadelphia Athletics (AA), Baltimore Monumentals | |
| Bill Sweeney (IF) | June 4, 1907 | October 5, 1914 | Second baseman | Chicago Cubs, Boston Doves/Rustlers/Braves | |
| Bill Sweeney (P) | April 13, 1928 | September 27, 1931 | Pitcher | Detroit Tigers, Boston Red Sox | |
| Brian Sweeney | August 16, 2003 | September 28, 2006 | Pitcher | Seattle Mariners, San Diego Padres | |
| Buck Sweeney | September 28, 1914 | September 28, 1914 | Outfielder | Philadelphia Athletics | |
| Charlie Sweeney | May 11, 1882 | July 9, 1887 | Pitcher | Providence Grays, St. Louis Maroons, Cleveland Blues (AA) | |
| Dan Sweeney | April 18, 1895 | June 4, 1895 | Outfielder | Louisville Colonels | |
| Ed Sweeney | May 16, 1908 | June 1, 1919 | Catcher | New York Highlanders/Yankees, Pittsburgh Pirates | |
| Hank Sweeney | October 1, 1944 | October 1, 1944 | First baseman | Pittsburgh Pirates | |
| Jerry Sweeney | April 22, 1884 | October 16, 1884 | First baseman | Kansas City Cowboys (UA) | |
| Mark Sweeney | August 4, 1995 | September 26, 2008 | Utility player | St. Louis Cardinals, San Diego Padres, Cincinnati Reds, Milwaukee Brewers, Colorado Rockies, San Francisco Giants, Los Angeles Dodgers | |
| Mike Sweeney | September 14, 1995 | | First baseman | Kansas City Royals, Oakland Athletics, Seattle Mariners, Philadelphia Phillies | |
| Pete Sweeney | September 28, 1888 | October 2, 1890 | Third baseman | Washington Nationals (1886–1889), St. Louis Browns (AA), Louisville Colonels, Philadelphia Athletics (AA) | |
| Rooney Sweeney | July 25, 1883 | June 9, 1885 | Catcher | Baltimore Orioles (19th century), Baltimore Monumentals, St. Louis Maroons | |
| Ryan Sweeney | September 1, 2006 | | Outfielder | Chicago White Sox, Oakland Athletics | |
| Rick Sweet | April 8, 1978 | October 2, 1983 | Catcher | San Diego Padres, New York Mets, Seattle Mariners | |
| Les Sweetland | July 4, 1927 | September 21, 1931 | Pitcher | Philadelphia Phillies, Chicago Cubs | |
| Ham Sweigert | October 12, 1890 | October 12, 1890 | Outfielder | Philadelphia Phillies (AA) | |
| Augie Swentor | September 12, 1922 | September 12, 1922 | Pinch hitter | Chicago White Sox | |
| Steve Swetonic | April 17, 1929 | May 19, 1935 | Pitcher | Pittsburgh Pirates | |
| Pop Swett | May 3, 1890 | October 4, 1890 | Catcher | Boston Reds | |
| Bill Swift (1930s P) | April 12, 1932 | September 29, 1943 | Pitcher | Pittsburgh Pirates, Boston Bees, Brooklyn Dodgers, Chicago White Sox | |
| Bill Swift (1990s P) | June 7, 1985 | September 11, 1998 | Pitcher | Seattle Mariners, San Francisco Giants, Colorado Rockies | |
| Bob Swift | April 16, 1940 | September 27, 1953 | Catcher | St. Louis Browns, Philadelphia Athletics, Detroit Tigers | |
| Oad Swigart | September 14, 1939 | September 27, 1940 | Pitcher | Pittsburgh Pirates | |
| Ad Swigler | September 15, 1917 | September 15, 1917 | Pitcher | New York Giants | |
| Greg Swindell | August 21, 1986 | September 23, 2002 | Pitcher | Cleveland Indians, Cincinnati Reds, Houston Astros, Minnesota Twins, Boston Red Sox, Arizona Diamondbacks | |
| Josh Swindell | September 16, 1911 | June 15, 1913 | Pitcher | Cleveland Naps | |
| Charlie Swindells | September 7, 1904 | September 22, 1904 | Catcher | St. Louis Cardinals | |
| R. J. Swindle | July 7, 2008 | | Pitcher | Philadelphia Phillies, Milwaukee Brewers | |
| Paul Swingle | September 7, 1993 | September 27, 1993 | Pitcher | California Angels | |
| Nick Swisher | September 3, 2004 | | Outfielder | Oakland Athletics, Chicago White Sox, New York Yankees | |
| Steve Swisher | June 14, 1974 | September 26, 1982 | Catcher | Chicago Cubs, St. Louis Cardinals, San Diego Padres | |
| Jon Switzer | August 2, 2003 | | Pitcher | Tampa Bay Devil Rays, New York Mets | |
| Ron Swoboda | April 12, 1965 | September 30, 1973 | Outfielder | New York Mets, Montreal Expos, New York Yankees | |
| Len Swormstedt | September 29, 1901 | October 6, 1906 | Pitcher | Cincinnati Reds, Boston Americans | |
| Bob Sykes | April 9, 1977 | October 4, 1981 | Pitcher | Detroit Tigers, St. Louis Cardinals | |
| Lou Sylvester | April 18, 1884 | August 14, 1887 | Outfielder | Cincinnati Outlaw Reds, Louisville Colonels, Cincinnati Red Stockings (AA), St. Louis Browns (AA) | |
| Joe Szekely | September 13, 1953 | September 27, 1953 | Outfielder | Cincinnati Reds | |
| Ken Szotkiewicz | April 7, 1970 | September 21, 1970 | Shortstop | Detroit Tigers | |
| Jason Szuminski | April 11, 2004 | May 9, 2004 | Pitcher | San Diego Padres | |
