= Daniel Cronin =

Daniel Cronin may refer to:

- Dan Cronin (born 1959), Illinois politician
- Daniel Cronin (bishop) (born 1927), American bishop
- Dan Cronin (baseball) (1857–1885), baseball player

== See also ==
- Cronin
- Marcus Daniel Cronin (1865–1936), United States military officer
