= Alexander Skinner =

Alexander Skinner may refer to:

- Al Skinner (baseball) (1856–1901), Major League Baseball player
- Alexander Skinner (politician) (1910–1968), member of the Queensland Legislative Assembly
- Xander Skinner (born 1998), Namibian swimmer
