= Joseph W. Dorsey =

Joseph W. Dorsey may refer to:

- Joseph Dorsey (politician), American politician from Pennsylvania
- Joseph Dorsey (baseball), American baseball pitcher and outfielder
