= Joseph Dorsey =

Joseph Dorsey may refer to:

- Joseph Dorsey Jr., American boxer
- Joseph Dorsey (politician), American politician from Pennsylvania
- Joseph Dorsey (baseball), American baseball pitcher and outfielder
