= Tom Lee (baseball) =

American baseball player (1862–1886)

- Pitcher
- Born: June 8, 1862; Milwaukee, Wisconsin, U.S.
- Died: March 4, 1886 (aged 23); Milwaukee, Wisconsin, U.S.
- Batted: unknown Threw: Unknown

MLB debut
- June 14, 1884, for the Chicago White Stockings

Last MLB appearance
- September 16, 1884, for the Baltimore Monumentals

MLB statistics
- Record: 6-12
- ERA: 3.50
- Strikeouts: 95
- Stats at Baseball Reference

Teams
- Chicago White Stockings (1884); Baltimore Monumentals (1884)

Thomas Frank Lee (June 8, 1862 – March 4, 1886) was an American Major League Baseball pitcher. He played for Chicago White Stockings and the Baltimore Monumentals in the 1884 season.
