= Chris McFarland =

American baseball player (1861–1918)

- Outfielder
- Born: August 17, 1861; Fall River, Massachusetts, U.S.
- Died: May 24, 1918 (aged 56); New Bedford, Massachusetts, U.S.
- Batted: Unknown Threw: Unknown

MLB debut
- April 19, 1884, for the Baltimore Monumentals

Last MLB appearance
- April 29, 1884, for the Baltimore Monumentals

MLB statistics
- Batting average: .214
- Home runs: 0
- Runs batted in: 0
- Stats at Baseball Reference

Teams
- Baltimore Monumentals (1884)

Christopher A. McFarland (August 7, 1861 – May 24, 1918) was an American Major League Baseball outfielder for the 1884 Baltimore Monumentals of the Union Association.
