= Bill Tierney (baseball) =

American baseball player (1858–1898)

- First baseman/Outfielder
- Born: May 14, 1858; Boston, Massachusetts, U.S.
- Died: September 21, 1898 (aged 40); Boston, Massachusetts, U.S.
- Batted: Unknown Threw: Unknown

MLB debut
- May 2, 1882, for the Cincinnati Red Stockings

Last MLB appearance
- April 24, 1884, for the Baltimore Monumentals

MLB statistics
- Batting average: .125
- Home runs: 0
- Hits: 1
- Stats at Baseball Reference

Teams
- Cincinnati Red Stockings (1882); Baltimore Monumentals (1884)

William J. Tierney (May 14, 1858 – September 21, 1898) was an American Major League Baseball player. He played for the 1882 Cincinnati Red Stockings of the American Association and the 1884 Baltimore Monumentals of the Union Association.
