= Frank Beck (baseball) =

American baseball player (1860–1941)

- Pitcher / Outfielder
- Born: April 29, 1860; Poughkeepsie, New York, U.S.
- Died: February 8, 1941 (aged 80); Detroit, Michigan, U.S.
- Batted: Unknown Threw: Right

MLB debut
- May 2, 1884, for the Pittsburgh Alleghenys

Last MLB appearance
- September 18, 1884, for the Baltimore Monumentals

MLB statistics
- Win–loss record: 0–5
- Earned run average: 6.62
- Strikeouts: 18
- Stats at Baseball Reference

Teams
- Pittsburgh Alleghenys (1884); Baltimore Monumentals (1884)

Frank J. Beck [born Frank J. Hengstebeck] (April 29, 1860 – February 8, 1941) was an American right-handed starting pitcher and right fielder in Major League Baseball who played for the Pittsburgh Alleghenys (American Association) and Baltimore Monumentals (Union Association) during the 1884 season.

In his one-season career, Beck posted a 0–5 record with a 6.62 ERA in five pitching appearances (four complete games), giving up 42 runs (17 unearned) on 50 hits and 10 walks while striking out 18 in 34.0 innings of work. He also played four games at right field. As a hitter, he went 6-for-32 for a .188 average, including two doubles and two runs scored.
