= James Morris (baseball) =

American baseball player

- Outfielder / Pitcher
- Born: December 29, 1860; Boonton, New Jersey, U.S.
- Died: July 10, 1925 (aged 64); Passaic, New Jersey, U.S.
- Batted: Unknown Threw: Unknown

MLB debut
- September 11, 1884, for the Baltimore Monumentals

Last MLB appearance
- September 11, 1884, for the Baltimore Monumentals

MLB statistics
- Win–loss record: 0–0
- Earned run average: 9.00
- On-base percentage: .000
- Stats at Baseball Reference

Teams
- Baltimore Monumentals (1884)

James A. Morris (December 29, 1860 – July 10, 1925) was an American professional baseball player who played pitcher and outfielder in the Major Leagues in 1884 for the Baltimore Monumentals of the Union Association. He appeared in one game for the Monumentals, and was hitless in three at-bats.
