= John Cuff (baseball) =

American baseball player (1864–1916)

- Catcher
- Born: June 1864; Jersey City, New Jersey, U.S.
- Died: September 16, 1916 (aged 52); Hoboken, New Jersey, U.S.
- Batted: Unknown Threw: Unknown

MLB debut
- September 11, 1884, for the Baltimore Monumentals

Last MLB appearance
- September 16, 1884, for the Baltimore Monumentals

MLB statistics
- Batting average: .091
- On-base percentage: .167
- Slugging percentage: .182
- Stats at Baseball Reference

Teams
- Baltimore Monumentals (1884)

John Patrick Cuff (June 1864 – September 16, 1916) was an American professional baseball player who played catcher in the Major Leagues in 1884 for the Baltimore Monumentals of the Union Association. He continued to play in the minor leagues through 1890.
