= Eddie Fusselback =

American baseball player (1856–1926)

- Catcher
- Born: July 17, 1856; Philadelphia, Pennsylvania, U.S.
- Died: April 14, 1926 (aged 69); Philadelphia, Pennsylvania, U.S.
- Batted: Right

MLB debut
- May 3, 1882, for the St. Louis Brown Stockings

Last MLB appearance
- August 28, 1888, for the Louisville Colonels

MLB statistics
- Batting average: .268
- Hits: 124
- Runs scored: 75
- Stats at Baseball Reference

Teams
- St. Louis Brown Stockings (1882); Baltimore Monumentals (1884); Philadelphia Athletics (1885); Louisville Colonels (1888)

Edward L. Fusselback (July 17, 1856 – April 14, 1926) was an American professional baseball player who played pitcher and catcher in the Major Leagues from 1882 to 1888. He would play for the St. Louis Browns, Baltimore Monumentals, Philadelphia Athletics, and Louisville Colonels. Fusselback was the only player in the American Association to record a save in 1882. Fusselback died after shooting himself, three weeks after his brother William D. Fusselback Jr. killed himself.

== See also ==
- List of Major League Baseball annual saves leaders
