= Charlie Fisher (baseball) =

American baseball player (1852–1917)

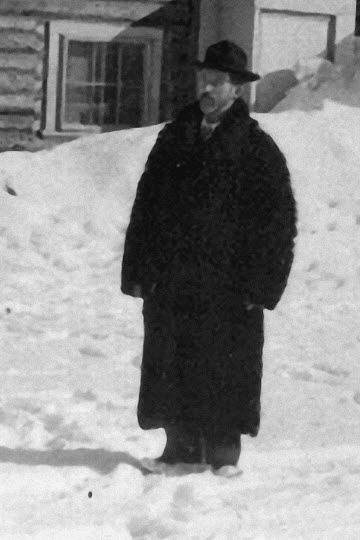
- Third baseman
- Born: March 10, 1852; Boxford, Massachusetts, U.S.
- Died: February 18, 1917 (aged 64); Eagle, Alaska
- Batted: Left Threw: Right

MLB debut
- June 7, 1884, for the Kansas City Cowboys

Last MLB appearance
- July 7, 1884, for the Chicago Browns

MLB statistics
- Batting average: .233
- Home runs: 0
- Runs scored: 4
- Stats at Baseball Reference

Teams
- Kansas City Cowboys (1884); Chicago Browns (1884)

Charles G. Fisher (born as Charles G. Fish) (March 10, 1852 – February 18, 1917) was a 19th-century American professional baseball third baseman. He played for the Kansas City Cowboys and the Chicago Browns in the Union Association in eleven games in June–July 1884. Fisher is the only Major League Baseball player known to have died in Alaska.
