= John Burns (baseball) =

American baseball player (born 1861)

- First baseman
- Born: February 1861; Brooklyn, New York, US
- Died: Unknown; San Francisco, California, US
- Batted: Unknown Threw: Unknown

MLB debut
- August 11, 1884, for the Baltimore Orioles

Last MLB appearance
- September 16, 1884, for the Baltimore Monumentals

MLB statistics
- Batting average: .241
- On-base percentage: .313
- Slugging percentage: .379
- Stats at Baseball Reference

Teams
- Baltimore Orioles (1884); Baltimore Monumentals (1884)

John E. Burns was an American professional baseball player who played first base in the Major Leagues in 1884.
