= Charlie Baker (baseball) =

American baseball player (1856–1937)

- Outfielder
- Born: January 15, 1856; West Boylston, Massachusetts, U.S.
- Died: January 15, 1937 (aged 81); Manchester, New Hampshire, U.S.
- Batted: Right Threw: Right

MLB debut
- August 1, 1884, for the Chicago Browns

Last MLB appearance
- August 27, 1884, for the Pittsburgh Stogies

MLB statistics
- Batting average: .140
- Home runs: 1
- Runs scored: 5
- Stats at Baseball Reference

Teams
- Chicago Browns/Pittsburgh Stogies (1884)

Charles Arthur Baker (1856–1937) was a 19th-century American professional baseball outfielder. He played for the Chicago Browns/Pittsburgh Stogies in the Union Association in 1884. He later played in the New England League in 1886–1887.
