= Patrick Horan =

American baseball player

- Pitcher/Outfielder
- Batted: Unknown Threw: Right

MLB debut
- May 17, 1884, for the Chicago Browns

Last MLB appearance
- July 14, 1884, for the Chicago Browns

MLB statistics
- Win–loss record: 3–6
- Earned run average: 3.49
- Strikeouts: 55
- Stats at Baseball Reference

Teams
- Chicago Browns (1884)

Patrick J. Horan (dates of birth and death unknown) was a Major League Baseball pitcher and outfielder during part of the 1884 season. Horan made 13 appearances as a pitcher (10 starts) and 10 as an outfielder in a total of 20 games for the Chicago Browns of the Union Association. He was a below-average fielder at both positions.

He completed 9 of his 10 starts, and finished seventh in the league with 3 games finished. He won 3, lost 6, and had an ERA of 3.49 in 98 innings pitched. All three of his victories came on the road against the Kansas City Cowboys. As a hitter, he was 6-for-68 for a batting average of .088. He drew one walk to push his on-base percentage to .101, and scored 3 runs.
