= Steve Matthias =

American baseball player (1860–1891)

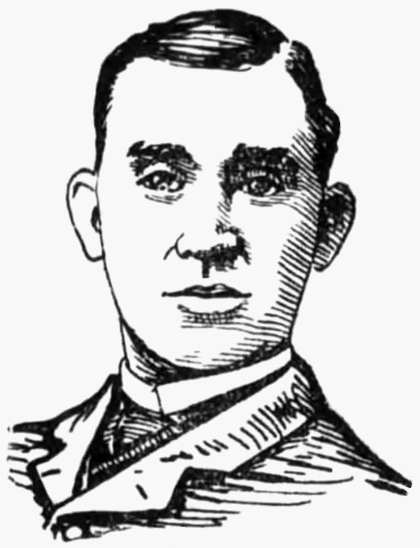
- An 1887 illustration
- Shortstop
- Born: Stephen Matheides; 1860; Mitchellville, Maryland, U.S.
- Died: July 29, 1891 (aged 31); Baltimore, Maryland, U.S.
- Batted: Right Threw: Right

MLB debut
- April 20, 1884, for the Chicago Browns

Last MLB appearance
- June 27, 1884, for the Chicago Browns

MLB statistics
- At bats: 142
- Home Runs: 0
- Batting average: .275
- Stats at Baseball Reference

Teams
- Chicago Browns/Pittsburgh Stogies (1884)

Stephen J. Matthias (1860 – July 29, 1891) was an American professional baseball player who played in thirty-seven games for the Chicago Browns/Pittsburgh Stogies of the Union Association during the 1884 season.

Stephen Matheides was born in Mitchellville, Maryland to Charles and Anna Matheides. His father was born in Hungary and his mother was born in Moravia. Charles died in 1866. In 1880, Matheides lived in Baltimore with his mother, brothers, and nephew, working as a can maker. By 1884, he went by the name Steve Matthias and played baseball professionally. In 1887, Matthias married Anna Nová at St. Wenceslaus Catholic Church. The couple had 3 sons. After his baseball career, Matthias returned to can making. He died from tuberculosis in Baltimore and was interred at the former St. Alphonsus Cemetery.
