= Art Richardson =

American baseball player

- Second baseman
- Born: Boston, Massachusetts, U.S.
- Batted: Unknown Threw: Unknown

MLB debut
- July 10, 1884, for the Chicago Browns

Last MLB appearance
- July 10, 1884, for the Chicago Browns

MLB statistics
- Games played: 1
- At bats: 4
- Hits: 0
- Stats at Baseball Reference

Teams
- Chicago Browns (1884)

Art Richardson was an American Major League Baseball second baseman who played in one game for the Chicago Browns in 1884.

Richardson went hitless in four at bats in his only career game. He also made one fielding error.
