= Charlie Householder (utility player) =

American baseball player (1855–1908)

- Third baseman/Outfielder
- Born: 1855; Harrisburg, Pennsylvania, U.S.
- Died: December 26, 1908; Harrisburg, Pennsylvania, U.S.
- Batted: Right Threw: Right

MLB debut
- April 20, 1884, for the Chicago Browns

Last MLB appearance
- September 18, 1884, for the Pittsburgh Stogies

MLB statistics
- Batting average: .239
- Home runs: 1
- Runs scored: 32
- Stats at Baseball Reference

Teams
- Chicago Browns/Pittsburgh Stogies (1884)

Charles F. Householder (1855 – December 26, 1908) was an American professional baseball player. He played one season in Major League Baseball as a third baseman and outfielder for the Chicago Browns/Pittsburgh Stogies of the Union Association.
