= Ed Smith (1880s pitcher) =

Canadian baseball player (1884

- Pitcher/Outfielder
- Born: November 2, 1863; Sparta, Ontario, Canada
- Died: June 5, 1948 (aged 84); St. Thomas, Ontario, Canada
- Batted: Unknown Threw: Unknown

MLB debut
- April 18, 1884, for the Baltimore Monumentals

Last MLB appearance
- May 22, 1884, for the Baltimore Monumentals

MLB statistics
- Win–loss record: 3–4
- Earned run average: 3.48
- Strikeouts: 13
- Stats at Baseball Reference

Teams
- Baltimore Monumentals (1884)

Ed Smith (November 2, 1863 – June 5, 1948) was a Canadian Major League Baseball pitcher / outfielder.

== Early life and education ==
Born in St. Thomas, Ontario, Canada, little is known about where he grew up or attended school.

== Career ==
He played for the Baltimore Monumentals of the Union Association in the 1884 season.
