= Jumbo Schoeneck =

American baseball player (1862–1930)

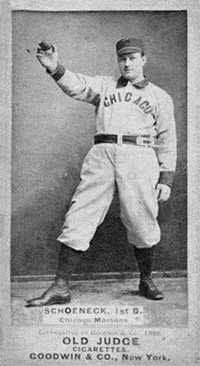
- 1887 baseball card of Schoeneck
- First baseman
- Born: March 3, 1862; Chicago, Illinois, U.S.
- Died: January 20, 1930 (aged 67); Chicago, Illinois, U.S.
- Batted: Right Threw: Right

MLB debut
- April 20, 1884, for the Chicago Browns/Pittsburgh Stogies

Last MLB appearance
- May 11, 1889, for the Indianapolis Hoosiers

MLB statistics
- Batting average: .283
- Home runs: 2
- Runs batted in: 28
- Stats at Baseball Reference

Teams
- Chicago Browns/Pittsburgh Stogies (1884); Baltimore Monumentals (1884); Indianapolis Hoosiers (1888–1889)

Louis W. "Jumbo" Schoeneck (March 3, 1862 – January 20, 1930) was an American Major League Baseball first baseman. He played for the Chicago Browns/Pittsburgh Stogies (1884) and Baltimore Monumentals (1884), both of the Union Association, and for the National League Indianapolis Hoosiers (1888–1889). He received the nickname "Jumbo" because he was 6 ft 3 in (1.91 m) and weighed 223 pounds.

Schoeneck was an average fielder and a good hitter during his major league career. His best season was 1884 when he finished in the league top ten in several offensive categories, including hits (131), batting average (.308), on-base percentage (.320), and slugging percentage (.387). Schoeneck's inflated statistics in 1884 are at least partly due to the weak competition of the Union Association, as compared to all of the other major leagues.

In his three major league seasons (170 games), Schoeneck was 186-for-657 (.283) with 79 runs scored. He pitched in two games for the 1888 Hoosiers and finished both, for a total of 4.1 innings, and allowed no earned runs.

Schoeneck died in his hometown of Chicago at the age of 67, and was buried at Mount Emblem Cemetery in Elmhurst, Illinois.
