= John Ryan (pitcher) =

American baseball player

- Pitcher/Outfielder
- Born: Unknown; Birmingham, Michigan
- Died: Unknown
- Batted: Left Threw: Right

MLB debut
- June 11, 1884, for the Baltimore Monumentals

Last MLB appearance
- August 27, 1884, for the Baltimore Monumentals

MLB statistics
- Win–loss record: 3-2
- Earned run average: 3.35
- Strikeouts: 33

Teams
- Baltimore Monumentals (1884)

John A. Ryan was a Major League Baseball pitcher. He played for the Baltimore Monumentals of the Union Association in the 1884 season. He also played for the Chattanooga Lookouts in the Southern League in 1885.
