= Charlie Levis =

American baseball player (1860–1926)

- First baseman
- Born: June 21, 1860; St. Louis, Missouri, U.S.
- Died: October 16, 1926 (aged 66); St. Louis, Missouri, U.S.
- Batted: Right Threw: Unknown

MLB debut
- April 17, 1884, for the Baltimore Monumentals

Last MLB appearance
- October 1, 1885, for the Baltimore Orioles

MLB statistics
- Batting average: .226
- Home runs: 5
- Runs batted in: 0
- Stats at Baseball Reference

Teams
- Baltimore Monumentals (1884); Washington Nationals (1884); Indianapolis Hoosiers (1884); Baltimore Orioles (1885)

Charles H. Levis (June 21, 1860 – October 16, 1926) was an American Major League Baseball first baseman in 1884 and 1885.
