= Charlie Cady =

American baseball player (1865–1909)

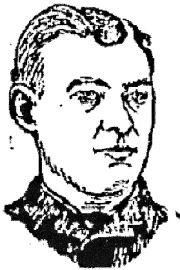
- Pitcher / Outfielder
- Born: December 22, 1864; Chicago, Illinois, U.S.
- Died: June 7, 1909 (aged 44); Chicago, Illinois, U.S.
- Batted: Unknown Threw: Unknown

MLB debut
- September 5, 1883, for the Cleveland Blues

Last MLB appearance
- June 19, 1884, for the Kansas City Cowboys

MLB statistics
- Win–loss record: 3–2
- Earned run average: 3.77
- Strikeouts: 20
- Stats at Baseball Reference

Teams
- Cleveland Blues (1883); Chicago Browns/Pittsburgh Stogies (1884); Kansas City Cowboys (1884)

Charles B. Cady (December 1865 – June 7, 1909) was an American Major League Baseball (MLB) pitcher and outfielder in the 19th century. In 1883, he played in three games for the Cleveland Blues of the National League, and in 1884 played in six games for the Chicago Browns and in two games for the Kansas City Cowboys, both of the Union Association.

In 11 total games, Cady was just 2-for-34 at the plate, a batting average of .059. He was much more successful as a pitcher. In five starts, all complete games, he was 3–2 with an earned run average of 3.77.

At age 17 in 1883, he was the second-youngest player to appear in a National League game, and at age 18 in 1884 was the sixth-youngest in the Union Association.
