= Al Atkinson (baseball) =

American baseball player (1861–1952)

- Pitcher
- Born: March 9, 1861; Clinton, Illinois, U.S.
- Died: June 17, 1952 (aged 91); McDonald County, Missouri, U.S.
- Batted: Right Threw: Right

MLB debut
- May 1, 1884, for the Philadelphia Athletics

Last MLB appearance
- August 13, 1887, for the Philadelphia Athletics

MLB statistics
- Win–loss record: 51-51
- Earned run average: 3.96
- Strikeouts: 435
- Stats at Baseball Reference

Teams
- Philadelphia Athletics (1884); Chicago Browns (1884); Baltimore Monumentals (1884); Philadelphia Athletics (1886–1887)

Career highlights and awards
- Pitched two no-hitters (1884, 1886)

Albert Wright Atkinson (March 9, 1861 – June 17, 1952) was an American Major League Baseball pitcher who played three seasons; one in the Union Association and parts of three seasons in the American Association. He became the first player to desert his existing contract to jump over to the Union Association. He is one of the few pitchers in Major League history to throw two no-hitters.

== Career ==
Atkinson was born in Clinton, Illinois, and he began his Major League career with the Philadelphia Athletics in 1884, pitching in 22 games, winning 11 and losing 11. Later in the season, Al jumped to the new Union Association, remaining there until season's end. With that move, Al became the first player to desert his existing contract and join the Union Association. He played for two teams during his time in the Union Association, a league that folded following the season. He began play with the Chicago Browns and later played for the Baltimore Monumentals and had a combined record of 20 wins and 26 losses during the 1884 season. On May 24, 1884, he pitched his first no-hitter. He tossed his gem against the Pittsburgh Alleghenys in a 10–1 victory. This no-hitter is also notable for the fact that Al allowed the first batter of the game on base with a hit by pitch and then retired the next 27 batters in a row. The only run scored when Ed Swartwood, the player hit by the pitch, stole second base‚ took third base on a putout‚ and then scored on a passed ball.

He played for an independent minor league team, the Chicago Blues, during the 1885 season, but returned the Athletics for the 1886 season. He pitched his second no-hitter on May 1, 1886, against the New York Metropolitans in a 3–2 victory.

== Post-career ==
After his career, he became a farmer. Al died at the age of 91 in McDonald County, Missouri, and is interred at the Macedonia Cemetery in Stella, Missouri.

== See also ==
- List of Major League Baseball no-hitters

Achievements
Preceded by Hugh Daily; Charlie Ferguson	No-hitter pitcher May 24, 1884; May 1, 1886	Succeeded by Ed Morris; Adonis Terry
