= Frank Bahret =

American baseball player (1858–1888)

- Outfielder
- Born: 1858; Poughkeepsie, New York, U.S.
- Died: March 30, 1888 (aged 29–30); Poughkeepsie, New York, U.S.
- Batted: Unknown Threw: Unknown

MLB debut
- April 17, 1884, for the Baltimore Monumentals

Last MLB appearance
- April 22, 1884, for the Baltimore Monumentals

MLB statistics
- Batting average: .000
- Home runs: 0
- Runs scored: 0
- Stats at Baseball Reference

Teams
- Baltimore Monumentals (1884)

Franklin F. Bahret (1858 – March 30, 1888), sometimes referenced as Frank J. Bahret was an American professional baseball outfielder for the Baltimore Monumentals of the Union Association in 1884. He also played for Indianapolis during the 1884 season. He stood 6 ft 1 in (1.85 m) and weighed 184 lb (83 kg).

Bahret was born in Poughkeepsie, New York, in 1858. After playing in 1883 for the Poughkeepsie Browns, Bahret signed with Baltimore during the 1884 off-season for a salary of $1,000. He debuted on April 17, 1884 (Opening Day) against the Washington Nationals. He had no hits in four at-bats, but played well in center field. Bahret made his second and last professional baseball appearance on April 22, 1884, playing in center field against the Philadelphia Keystones. He was released from the Monumentals before the end of April. For his career, Bahret had zero hits in eight at bats and handled four fielding chances without an error.

After his brief baseball career, Bahret worked as a cooper in Baltimore. He died on March 30, 1888, at his home in Poughkeepsie.
