= Bernie Graham =

American baseball player (1863–1886)

- Outfielder
- Born: February 10, 1863; Beloit, Wisconsin
- Died: October 30, 1886 (aged 23); Mobile, Alabama
- Batted: Left Threw: Unknown

MLB debut
- July 11, 1884, for the Chicago Browns

Last MLB appearance
- October 15, 1884, for the Baltimore Monumentals

MLB statistics
- Batting average: .267
- Runs: 23
- Games played: 42
- Stats at Baseball Reference

Teams
- Chicago Browns (1884); Baltimore Monumentals (1884)

Bernard W. Graham (February 10, 1863– October 30, 1886) was an American Major League Baseball player who played one season in the Union Association. The Association lasted just one season, 1884, and Graham played one game for the Chicago Browns and 41 for the Baltimore Monumentals. He batted .267 for the year, scored 23 runs, and hit 11 doubles.

Graham died at the age of 23 in Mobile, Alabama from typhoid fever, and is interred at Catholic Cemetery in Mobile / Catholic Cemetery, Beloit, Rock County, Wisconsin.

== Death ==
Death notice taken from the Beloit Weekly Free Press, from November 11, 1886, page 3

The remains of Mr. Barney Graham arrived in the city Thursday from Mobile, Alabama. Deceased was a professional baseball player in the South and died of a fever. His parents live four miles west of the city and came to Wisconsin from the East about two years ago. The remains will be buried in this city.

== Grave ==
Rhode Island Birth Index, 1863.

Name: Graham, Bernard; Sex: Male; Birthdate: 02 10 63 [February 10, 1863]; Father: Thomas; Mother: Rose; Bk-Pg-Ct: 63-113-03.
