= Frank Bishop =

American baseball player (1860–1929)

- Infielder
- Born: September 21, 1860; Belvidere, Illinois, U.S
- Died: June 18, 1929 (aged 68); Chicago, Illinois, U.S.
- Batted: Unknown Threw: Unknown

MLB debut
- May 27, 1884, for the Chicago Browns

Last MLB appearance
- May 30, 1884, for the Chicago Browns

MLB statistics
- Batting average: .188
- Home runs: 0
- Runs scored: 1
- Stats at Baseball Reference

Teams
- Chicago Browns (1884)

Frank H. Bishop (September 21, 1860 – June 18, 1929) was an American 19th-century professional baseball infielder. He played for the Chicago Browns in the Union Association in May 1884. After his brief stint in the Majors, he played in the Southern League in 1885, the Northwestern League in 1886-1887, the Central Interstate League in 1888 and the Texas League in 1889.
