= Charlie Briggs (baseball) =

American baseball player (1860–1920)

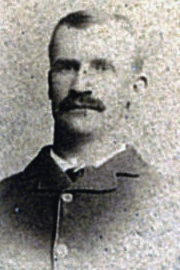
- Second baseman / Outfielder
- Born: September 1860; Batavia, Illinois, U.S.
- Died: March 10, 1920 (aged 59); Seattle, Washington, U.S.
- Batted: Unknown Threw: Unknown

MLB debut
- May 2, 1884, for the Chicago Browns

Last MLB appearance
- August 5, 1884, for the Chicago Browns

MLB statistics
- Batting average: .170
- Home runs: 1
- Runs scored: 29
- Stats at Baseball Reference

Teams
- Chicago Browns (1884)

Charles R. Briggs (September 1860 – March 10, 1920) was a 19th-century American professional baseball second baseman and outfielder. He played for the Chicago Browns in the Union Association during the 1884 season. In 1888 he played minor league ball in the Central Interstate League and the Tri-State League.
