= Phil Coridan =

American baseball player (1858–1915)

- Second baseman/Outfielder
- Born: August 19, 1858; Walpole, Indiana, U.S.
- Died: July 1, 1915 (aged 56); Indianapolis, Indiana, U.S.
- Batted: Left Threw: Unknown

MLB debut
- July 16, 1884, for the Chicago Browns

Last MLB appearance
- July 17, 1884, for the Chicago Browns

MLB statistics
- Batting average: .143
- Home runs: 0
- Runs scored: 1
- Stats at Baseball Reference

Teams
- Chicago Browns (1884)

Philip F. Coridan (August 19, 1858 – July 1, 1915) was a 19th-century American professional baseball second baseman and outfielder. He played for the Chicago Browns in the Union Association in two games in July 1884. He had one hit in seven at-bats in his two games.
