= John O'Brien (outfielder) =

American baseball player (1851–1914)

- Outfielder
- Born: October 22, 1851; Columbus, Ohio, U.S.
- Died: December 31, 1914 (aged 63); Fall River, Massachusetts, U.S.
- Batted: Unknown Threw: Right

MLB debut
- April 19, 1884, for the Baltimore Monumentals

Last MLB appearance
- May 31, 1884, for the Baltimore Monumentals

MLB statistics
- Batting average: .247
- On-base percentage: .266
- Slugging percentage: .286
- Stats at Baseball Reference

Teams
- Baltimore Monumentals (1884)

John E. O'Brien (October 22, 1851 – December 31, 1914) was an American professional baseball player who played outfield in the Major Leagues in 1884 for the Baltimore Monumentals of the Union Association. He later played for the Bridgeport Giants of the Eastern League in 1885.
