= Bill Henderson (baseball manager) =

American baseball manager

William C. Henderson (September 16, 1857 in Baltimore, Maryland – October 27, 1929 in Fullerton, Maryland) was a Major League Baseball manager for the 1884 Baltimore Monumentals of the Union Association. He won 58 games and lost 47 during the one season that the Monumentals existed. The team finished in 4th place in the Association.
