= Joe Stanley (1880s outfielder) =

American baseball player

- Outfielder
- Born: Unknown; New Jersey, U.S.
- Died: Unknown
- Batted: Unknown Threw: Unknown

MLB debut
- April 24, 1884, for the Baltimore Monumentals

Last MLB appearance
- June 18, 1884, for the Baltimore Monumentals

MLB statistics
- Batting average: .238
- On-base percentage: .238
- Slugging percentage: .286
- Stats at Baseball Reference

Teams
- Baltimore Monumentals (1884)

Joseph Stanley was a professional baseball player who played outfield in the Major Leagues in 1884 for the Baltimore Monumentals of the Union Association. He played in six games for the Monumentals and recorded five hits in 21 at-bats.
