= Tom Sullivan (catcher) =

American baseball player (1906–1944)

- Catcher
- Born: December 19, 1906; Nome, Alaska, US
- Died: August 16, 1944 (aged 37); Seattle, Washington, US
- Batted: Right Threw: Right

MLB debut
- June 14, 1925, for the Cincinnati Reds

Last MLB appearance
- June 14, 1925, for the Cincinnati Reds

MLB statistics
- Batting average: .000 (0-for-1)
- Home runs: 0
- Runs batted in: 0
- Stats at Baseball Reference

Teams
- Cincinnati Reds (1925)

Thomas Brandon Sullivan (December 19, 1906 – August 16, 1944) was a professional baseball catcher. He played in one game for the 1925 Cincinnati Reds of Major League Baseball (MLB). Listed at 6 feet 0 inches (1.83 m) and 190 pounds (86 kg), he batted and threw right-handed. Sullivan was the first person born in Alaska to play in MLB. (Note: At the time of Sullivan's birth, 1906, it was the District of Alaska, becoming the Territory of Alaska in 1912, and a state in 1959.) There would not be another for over a half century, until Steve Staggs made his MLB debut in 1977.

== Biography ==
Baseball records list Sullivan's one game with the Cincinnati Reds in 1925, and 55 games with the minor league Seattle Indians of the Pacific Coast League in 1928.

Sullivan's one major league appearance came on June 14, 1925, with the Reds hosting the Brooklyn Robins at Redland Field (later renamed Crosley Field). Sullivan played defensively at catcher for the final three innings, allowing one passed ball from pitcher Neal Brady. Sullivan had one plate appearance; facing Brooklyn's Dazzy Vance with one out in the ninth inning, he grounded out, shortstop to first. The Cincinnati Enquirer noted that it was Sullivan's first professional game, referring to him as "the big college boy from Seattle". He was released by the Reds on June 29.

Sullivan attended the University of Washington prior to playing professional baseball.
