= Tony Suck =

American baseball player (1858–1895)

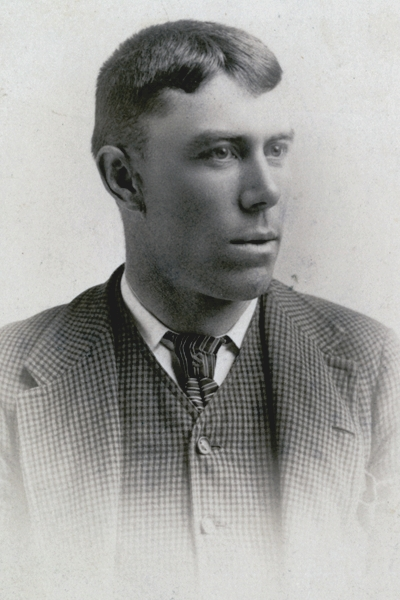
- Suck c.1886
- Catcher
- Born: June 11, 1858; Chicago, Illinois, US
- Died: January 29, 1895 (aged 36); Chicago, Illinois, US
- Batted: Unknown Threw: Unknown

MLB debut
- August 9, 1883, for the Buffalo Bisons

Last MLB appearance
- October 15, 1884, for the Baltimore Monumentals

MLB statistics
- Batting average: .151
- Hits: 31
- Runs batted in: 0
- Stats at Baseball Reference

Teams
- Buffalo Bisons (1883); Chicago Browns (1884); Baltimore Monumentals (1884)

Charles Anthony Suck, Born:Charles Anthony Zuck (June 11, 1858 – January 29, 1895) was an American Major League Baseball player from Chicago, Illinois, who mainly played catcher for three teams over the span of two seasons. He debuted for the 1883 Buffalo Bisons of the National League. He only played in two games, and had no base hits in seven at-bats. Tony then played the next season in the short-lived Union Association in 1884, splitting the season between the Baltimore Monumentals and the Chicago Browns.

A highly regarded individual in the Chicago and minor league baseball communities, he was well liked for his easygoing nature and played amateur and semi-professional ball nearly to the end of his life, which occurred at the age of 36 after a bout with pneumonia, and was interred at Oak Woods Cemetery.
