= Bill Sweeney (pitcher) =

American baseball player (1858–1903)

- Pitcher / Outfielder
- Born: 1858; Philadelphia, Pennsylvania, U.S.
- Died: August 2, 1903 (aged 44–45); Philadelphia, Pennsylvania, U.S.
- Batted: Unknown Threw: Right

MLB debut
- June 27, 1882, for the Philadelphia Athletics

Last MLB appearance
- October 14, 1884, for the Baltimore Monumentals

MLB statistics
- Win–loss record: 49–31
- Earned run average: 2.67
- Strikeouts: 422
- Stats at Baseball Reference

Teams
- Providence Grays (1881); Philadelphia Athletics (1882); Baltimore Monumentals (1884)

William J. Sweeney (1858 – August 2, 1903) was an American professional baseball pitcher. He played in Major League Baseball for the Providence Grays (1881), Philadelphia Athletics (1882), and Baltimore Monumentals (1884). In 1884, he won 40 games for Baltimore, leading the Union Association in wins (40), complete games (58), and innings pitched (538).

== Early years ==
Sweeney was born in 1858 in Philadelphia. He grew up in the Fairmount neighborhood of Philadelphia.

== Professional baseball ==
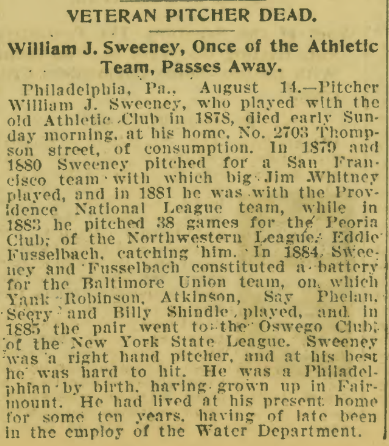
Sweeney's obituary from Sporting Life

Sweeney began his professional baseball career with the Athletic Club in 1878. He next played for the San Francisco baseball club in 1879 and 1880. He joined Providence of the National League for the 1881 season. In 1882, he played for the Philadelphia Athletics of the American Association. He started 20 games for the Athletics, compiling a 9-10 record with a 2.91 ERA.

In 1883, Sweeney pitched 38 games for Peoria of the Northwestern League.

In 1884, Sweeney played for the Baltimore Monumentals of the Union Association (UA), appearing in 62 games and compiling a 40-21 record with a 2.59 ERA. His 40 wins led the UA, as no other player even reached 30 wins that year. Only 24 players in major-league history have won 40 games in a season. He also led the UA in 1884 with 58 complete games and 538 innings pitched and ranked second in the UA with 374 strikeouts and third with a 7.3 Wins Above Replacement.

In 1885, Sweeney played for the Cleveland Forest Cities in the Western League. In 1885 and 1886, he played for Oswego of the New York State League League.

== Later years ==
As of 1887, Sweeney was with the Beford Club when frequent hemorrhages put his life in danger. He continued to suffer from poor health after his playing career ended. As of 1890, he was working at a machine shop in Philadelphia. He later worked for the Water Department. He died in Philadelphia in 1903 at age 45. The cause of death was reported as "consumption", a term then used for tuberculosis.
