= Gat Stires =

American baseball player (1849–1933)

- Right fielder
- Born: October 13, 1849; Hunterdon County, New Jersey, U.S.
- Died: June 13, 1933 (aged 83); Oregon, Illinois, U.S.
- Batted: Left Threw: Right

MLB debut
- May 6, 1871, for the Rockford Forest Citys

Last MLB appearance
- September 15, 1871, for the Rockford Forest Citys

MLB statistics
- Batting average: .273
- Home runs: 2
- Runs batted in: 24
- Stats at Baseball Reference

Teams
- National Association of Base Ball Players Rockford Forest Citys (1868–1870) National Association of Professional BBP Rockford Forest Citys (1871)

Garret C. Stires (October 13, 1849 – June 13, 1933) was an American Major League Baseball right fielder in the 19th century. He played for the Rockford Forest Citys of the National Association in 1871. He was a native of Hunterdon County, New Jersey.

As the Forest Citys starting right fielder, Stires was the team leader in runs batted in (24) and slugging percentage (.473). In 25 games, he hit .273 (30-for-110) with four doubles, six triples, two home runs, and 23 runs scored. He made 7 errors in 43 total chances in the outfield.

Stires died at the age of 83 in Oregon, Illinois.
