= Al Skinner (baseball) =

American baseball player (1856–1901)

- Outfielder
- Born: Chicago, Illinois, U.S.
- Died: Washington, Massachusetts, U.S.
- Batted: Unknown Threw: Unknown

MLB debut
- July 12, 1884, for the Baltimore Monumentals

Last MLB appearance
- July 16, 1884, for the Chicago Browns

MLB statistics
- Batting average: .333
- Home runs: 0
- Runs scored: 0
- Stats at Baseball Reference

Teams
- Baltimore Monumentals (1884); Chicago Browns (1884)

Alexander Skinner (August 14, 1856 – March 5, 1901) was an American former Major League Baseball player. Skinner's handedness and physical dimensions are currently unknown. He appeared as an outfielder in two games in the Union Association in 1884.

Skinner served as a right fielder for the Baltimore Monumentals in one game (July 12), then played one game in center field for the Chicago Browns four days later. In his short career, he collected two hits in six at bats for a career batting average of .333, and also scored one run. In the field he handled two chances, making no errors.
