= Steve Staggs =

American baseball player (1951–2024)

- Second baseman
- Born: May 6, 1951; Anchorage, Alaska, U.S.
- Died: January 21, 2024 (aged 72); Frisco, Texas, U.S.
- Batted: Right Threw: Right

MLB debut
- July 1, 1977, for the Toronto Blue Jays

Last MLB appearance
- June 20, 1978, for the Oakland Athletics

MLB statistics
- Batting average: .255
- Home runs: 2
- Runs batted in: 28
- Stats at Baseball Reference

Teams
- Toronto Blue Jays (1977); Oakland Athletics (1978)

Stephen Robert Staggs (May 6, 1951 – January 21, 2024) was an American Major League Baseball second baseman who played for two seasons. He played 72 games for the Toronto Blue Jays during the 1977 Toronto Blue Jays season and 47 games for the Oakland Athletics during the 1978 Oakland Athletics season.

Staggs was the second MLB player born in Alaska; the first was Tom Sullivan in 1925. Sullivan played one game, and grounded out in his only at bat, so Staggs was the first Alaskan-born player to collect a hit, score a run, get an RBI, or to hit a double, triple or homer in an MLB game.

== Major League Career ==
=== Toronto Blue Jays (1977) ===
Staggs was drafted by the Kansas City Royals in the third round of the 1971 MLB draft, and remained in their minor league system through the 1976 season. On November 5, 1976, the Toronto Blue Jays selected Staggs in the 1976 MLB expansion draft.

Staggs was sent down to the minor leagues after spring training, but a .377 average and a 30-game hit streak while in Triple-A attracted attention, and he was called up to the Blue Jays after three months. Staggs made his Major League Baseball debut on July 1, 1977, going 2 for 5 in an 11-8 loss to the Texas Rangers. Staggs first career hit was a home run off of Rangers pitcher Doyle Alexander. He was the Blue Jays everyday second baseman for most of the rest of the 1977 season, until an injury in mid-September. He finished the season appearing in 72 games with Toronto, batting .259 with 2 HR and 28 RBI.

Staggs did not show up to 1978 spring training, as he was demanding a long-term contract with the Blue Jays, saying "The fact remains that I did the best job of anybody they have." On March 25, 1978, the Blue Jays traded Staggs to the Oakland Athletics for Sheldon Mallory.

=== Oakland Athletics (1978) ===
Staggs opened the first four games of the 1978 season as Oakland Athletics' starting second baseman, but thereafter was essentially a back-up infielder mostly used as a late inning defensive replacement, although with the occasional spot start. In limited action, Staggs hit .244 with 0 HR and 0 RBI in 47 games with the Athletics. He was sent down to the minors by the end of June. Stung by the demotion, Staggs initially refused to report, saying “I’m willing to give up the game instead of going back to Triple-A.” He eventually reconsidered, and hit .310 for the Vancouver Canadians in 33 games, but the A's did not recall him to the majors.

Staggs would not play in MLB again. He spent the 1979 season with the Denver Bears of the American Association before retiring.

=== Major League career (1977–1978) ===
Staggs appeared in 119 career games, as he hit .255 with 2 HR and 28 RBI during his career.

== Death ==
Staggs died in Frisco, Texas, on January 21, 2024, at the age of 72.
