= Dan Cronin (baseball) =

American baseball player (1857–1885)

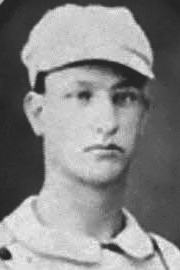
- Outfielder/Second Baseman
- Born: April 1, 1857; Boston, Massachusetts, U.S.
- Died: November 30, 1885 (aged 28); Boston, Massachusetts, U.S.
- Batted: Unknown Threw: Unknown

MLB debut
- July 9, 1884, for the Chicago Browns

Last MLB appearance
- July 14, 1884, for the St. Louis Maroons

MLB statistics
- Batting average: .111
- Home runs: 0
- Runs scored: 0
- Stats at Baseball Reference

Teams
- Chicago Browns (1884); St. Louis Maroons (1884)

Daniel T. Cronin (April 1, 1857 – November 30, 1885) was a 19th-century American professional baseball outfielder and second baseman. He played in two games for two different teams in the Union Association in July 1884. He had previously played in the Eastern Championship Association and the Interstate Association.

Cronin died in 1885, at the age of 28.
