= Rooney Sweeney =

American baseball player (born 1858)

- Catcher/Outfielder
- Born: November 1, 1858; New York, New York
- Died: Unknown
- Batted: Unknown Threw: Unknown

MLB debut
- July 25, 1883, for the Baltimore Orioles

Last MLB appearance
- June 9, 1885, for the St. Louis Maroons

MLB statistics
- Batting average: .215
- Home runs: 0
- Runs batted in: 0
- Stats at Baseball Reference

Teams
- Baltimore Orioles (1883); Baltimore Monumentals (1884); St. Louis Maroons (1885)

John J. Sweeney was a catcher and outfielder in Major League Baseball for the 1883 Baltimore Orioles of the American Association, the 1884 Baltimore Monumentals of the Union Association and the 1885 St. Louis Maroons of the National League.

== Sources ==
- Career statistics from Baseball Reference, or Baseball Reference (Minors)
