= Joseph Dorsey (baseball) =

American baseball player (1864–1913)

- Pitcher / Outfielder
- Born: 1864; Baltimore, Maryland, U.S.
- Died: January 31, 1913 (aged 48–49); New York, New York, U.S.
- Batted: Right Threw: Right

MLB debut
- July 9, 1884, for the Baltimore Monumentals

Last MLB appearance
- July 9, 1884, for the Baltimore Monumentals

MLB statistics
- Win–loss record: 0–1
- Earned run average: 9.00
- Strikeouts: 3
- Stats at Baseball Reference

Teams
- Baltimore Monumentals (1884)

Joseph Wilbur Dorsey (1864 – January 31, 1913) is an American former Major League Baseball pitcher and outfielder for the Baltimore Monumentals.

He played his one and only major league game on July 9, 1884. He started that game as a pitcher. However, after giving up 8 runs (only 4 earned though) in 4 innings he was switched to the outfield. He finished the game with the loss and 0-for-3 at the plate.
