= Chicago Browns/Pittsburgh Stogies =

American professional baseball team

Pittsburgh Stogies

Information
- League: Union Association
- Location: Allegheny, Pennsylvania
- Ballpark: Exposition Park II
- Founded: 1884
- Folded: September 18, 1884
- Former name: Chicago Browns (1884 – August 22, 1884)
- Former ballpark: South Side Park (1884 – August 22, 1884)
- Ownership: A. H. Henderson
- Manager: Ed Hengel, Joe Battin & Joe Ellick

The Chicago Browns/Pittsburgh Stogies (also known as Chicago/Pittsburgh) were a short-lived professional baseball team in the Union Association of 1884. They were to battle the Chicago White Stockings, of the National League, for the Chicago baseball market; however, the Browns lost that battle to the White Stockings. After a Baltimore mattress maker gave the club a degree of financial support, the Browns then tried to entice the White Stockings' Larry Corcoran, one of the 1880s top pitchers, to join the team. However, the club did not succeed in doing so. The Chicago Browns disbanded after a game on August 22, 1884. The club then moved to Pittsburgh and became the Stogies, which disbanded after a game played on September 18, 1884. Many of the club's players then joined the Baltimore Monumentals. Altogether, they won 41 games, lost 50 (including one forfeit), and tied 2, finishing sixth in the twelve-team league.

While in Chicago, they played their home games at the first South Side Park. After they moved to Pittsburgh, their home games were played at Exposition Park, which was located in Allegheny, Pennsylvania.

The Union Association officially folded on January 15, 1885 after only one season in existence.

== See also ==
- 1884 Chicago Browns/Pittsburgh Stogies season
