= Baltimore Monumentals =

Former baseball team and Union Association franchise in Baltimore, Maryland, US

The Baltimore Monumentals were an American baseball team in the short-lived Union Association. In their lone season of 1884, they finished fourth in the UA with a 58–47 record.

== History ==
The team was managed by Bill Henderson. Their top-hitting regular was left fielder Emmett Seery, who batted .311 with a slugging percentage of .408, and their ace pitcher was Bill Sweeney, who was 40–21 with an earned run average of 2.59, and pitched 538 of the team's 946 innings. The Monumentals were disbanded after the Union Association folded at the end of the 1884 season.

== Ballpark ==
The Monumentals' home ground was the Belair Lot, which was sometimes known as the Union Association Grounds. On July 4, 1884, Baltimore played a split double header against the Cincinnati Outlaw Reds and the run-away league leaders, the St. Louis Maroons, which saw a sellout crowd in attendance. The field also hosted a home game for the traveling Chicago Browns team.

The team did play one game on August 25, 1884 at the larger Madison Avenue Ground, in a win against the Washington Nationals. However, the playing field was deemed unfit to use and they returned to the Belair Lot.

== Team nickname ==
Baltimore was the first city to erect a monument to George Washington. According to the city's article, "Baltimore has more public statues and monuments per capita than any other city in the country." It is assumed that the team's name was a recognition of that fact.

== Name confusion ==
Retrosheet and Baseball Reference call the UA team the Monumentals. However, The Baltimore Sun for 1884 consistently called the UA team simply the "Unions", while "Monumentals" referred to a short-lived Baltimore entry in the minor Eastern League.

== See also ==
- 1884 Baltimore Monumentals season
