= Cincinnati Outlaw Reds all-time roster =

List of baseball players

The Cincinnati Outlaw Reds were a professional baseball team that played in the Union Association for one season in 1884. The franchise used Bank Street Grounds as their home field. During their only season in existence, the team finished third in the UA with a record of 69–36.

== Players ==
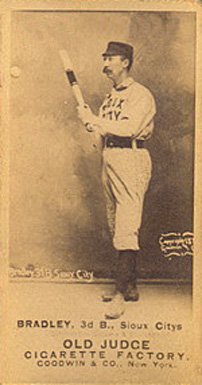
Pitcher George Bradley

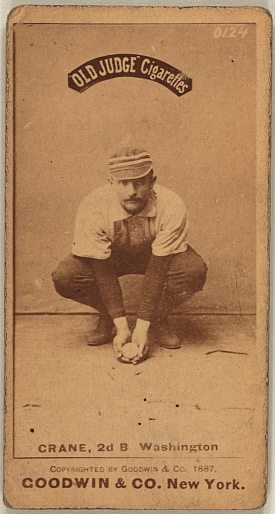
Second baseman Sam Crane

Players who played for the Cincinnati Outlaw Reds, primary position played, and season(s) played for franchise
Player	Position(s)	Season(s)	Notes	Ref
Charlie Barber	Third baseman	1884		
George Bradley	Pitcher	1884	Bradley led the Outlaw Reds in wins (25) and strikeouts (168).	
Fatty Briody	Catcher	1884		
Dick Burns	Center fielder / Pitcher	1884	Burns led the Outlaw Reds in batting average (.306) and runs scored (84) and also won 23 games.	
Elmer Cleveland	Third baseman	1884		
Sam Crane	Second baseman	1884	Crane was one of the Outlaw Reds' managers.	
Joe Crotty	Catcher	1884		
John Ewing	Right fielder	1884		
Jack Glasscock	Shortstop	1884		
Bill Harbridge	Center fielder / Right fielder	1884		
Bill Hawes	Right fielder / Left fielder	1884		
Ri Jones	Shortstop	1884		
John Kelly	Catcher	1884		
Ed Kennedy	Third baseman	1884		
Jim McCormick	Pitcher	1884	McCormick had a win–loss record of 21–3 for the Outlaw Reds.	
Frank McLaughlin	Shortstop	1884		
Mox McQuery	First baseman	1884		
Lou Meyers	Catcher	1884		
Dan O'Leary	Left fielder	1884	O'Leary was one of the Outlaw Reds' managers.	
Martin Powell	First baseman	1884		
Fred Robinson	Second baseman	1884		
Bill Schwartz	Catcher	1884		
Lou Sylvester	Left fielder	1884		
