= 1884 Cincinnati Outlaw Reds season =

1884 Cincinnati Outlaw Reds
- League: Union Association
- Ballpark: Bank Street Grounds
- City: Cincinnati, Ohio
- Record: 69–36 (.657)
- League place: 2nd
- Owners: Justus Thorner, John McLean
- Managers: Dan O'Leary, Sam Crane

The 1884 Cincinnati Outlaw Reds finished with a 69–36 record in the Union Association, finishing in third place (second among teams that played a full schedule). This was the only season the team existed, and indeed the only season the Union Association existed.

== Regular season ==
=== Season standings ===
Union Association
| Team | W | L | Pct. | GB | Home | Road |
|---|---|---|---|---|---|---|
| St. Louis Maroons | 94 | 19 | .832 | — | 49‍–‍6 | 45‍–‍13 |
| Cincinnati Outlaw Reds | 69 | 36 | .657 | 21 | 35‍–‍17 | 34‍–‍19 |
| Baltimore Monumentals | 58 | 47 | .552 | 32 | 29‍–‍21 | 29‍–‍26 |
| Boston Reds | 58 | 51 | .532 | 34 | 34‍–‍22 | 24‍–‍29 |
| Milwaukee Brewers | 8 | 4 | .667 | 35½ | 8‍–‍4 | 0‍–‍0 |
| St. Paul Saints | 2 | 6 | .250 | 39½ | 0‍–‍0 | 2‍–‍6 |
| Chicago Browns/Pittsburgh Stogies | 41 | 50 | .451 | 42 | 21‍–‍19 | 20‍–‍31 |
| Altoona Mountain Citys | 6 | 19 | .240 | 44 | 6‍–‍12 | 0‍–‍7 |
| Wilmington Quicksteps | 2 | 16 | .111 | 44½ | 1‍–‍6 | 1‍–‍10 |
| Washington Nationals (UA) | 47 | 65 | .420 | 46½ | 36‍–‍27 | 11‍–‍38 |
| Philadelphia Keystones | 21 | 46 | .313 | 50 | 14‍–‍21 | 7‍–‍25 |
| Kansas City Cowboys | 16 | 63 | .203 | 61 | 11‍–‍23 | 5‍–‍40 |

=== Record vs. opponents ===
1884 Union Association record Sources:
| Team | ALT | BLU | BSU | CUN | COR | KC | MIL | PHK | SLM | SPS | WST | WIL |
|---|---|---|---|---|---|---|---|---|---|---|---|---|
| Altoona | — | 1–3 | 1–1 | 0–0 | 0–3 | 0–0 | 0–0 | 1–3 | 0–8 | 0–0 | 3–1 | 0–0 |
| Baltimore | 3–1 | — | 10–5–1 | 7–5 | 4–10 | 10–2 | 1–3 | 10–2 | 1–14 | 0–0 | 11–5 | 1–0 |
| Boston | 1–1 | 5–10–1 | — | 4–8–1 | 5–11 | 8–4 | 2–2 | 8–3 | 8–8 | 0–0 | 12–4 | 5–0 |
| Chicago/Pittsburgh | 0–0 | 5–7 | 8–4–1 | — | 7–8 | 12–4 | 0–0 | 3–5 | 2–14 | 0–0 | 4–8–1 | 0–0 |
| Cincinnati | 3–0 | 10–4 | 11–5 | 8–7 | — | 9–1 | 0–0 | 9–0 | 4–12 | 3–0 | 10–6 | 2–1 |
| Kansas City | 0–0 | 2–10 | 4–8 | 4–12 | 1–9 | — | 0–0 | 0–4 | 0–11–1 | 1–1–1 | 4–8–1 | 0–0 |
| Milwaukee | 0–0 | 3–1 | 2–2 | 0–0 | 0–0 | 0–0 | — | 0–0 | 0–0 | 0–0 | 3–1 | 0–0 |
| Philadelphia | 3–1 | 2–10 | 3–8 | 5–3 | 0–9 | 4–0 | 0–0 | — | 0–8 | 0–0 | 4–7 | 0–0 |
| St. Louis | 8–0 | 14–1 | 8–8 | 14–2 | 12–4 | 11–0–1 | 0–0 | 8–0 | — | 2–1 | 13–3 | 4–0 |
| St. Paul | 0–0 | 0–0 | 0–0 | 0–0 | 0–3 | 1–1–1 | 0–0 | 0–0 | 1–2 | — | 0–0 | 0–0 |
| Washington | 1–3 | 5–11 | 4–12 | 8–4–1 | 6–10 | 8–4–1 | 1–3 | 7–4 | 3–13 | 0–0 | — | 4–1 |
| Wilmington | 0–0 | 0–1 | 0–5 | 0–0 | 1–2 | 0–0 | 0–0 | 0–0 | 0–4 | 0–0 | 1–4 | — |

=== Roster ===
1884 Cincinnati Outlaw Reds
Roster
| Pitchers: George Bradley; Jim McCormick; Catchers: Fatty Briody; Joe Crotty; John Kelly; Lou Meyers; Bill Schwartz | Infielders: Charlie Barber; Elmer Cleveland; Sam Crane; Jack Glasscock; Ri Jones; Ed Kennedy; Frank McLaughlin; Mox McQuery; Martin Powell; Fred Robinson | Outfielders: Dick Burns; John Ewing; Bill Harbridge; Bill Hawes; Dan O'Leary; Lou Sylvester | Manager: Sam Crane; Dan O'Leary |

== Player stats ==
=== Batting ===
==== Starters by position ====
Note: Pos = Position; G = Games played; AB = At bats; H = Hits; Avg. = Batting average; HR = Home runs

| Pos | Player | G | AB | H | Avg. | HR |
|---|---|---|---|---|---|---|
| C | John Kelly | 38 | 142 | 40 | .282 | 1 |
| 1B | Martin Powell | 43 | 185 | 59 | .319 | 1 |
| 2B | Sam Crane | 80 | 309 | 72 | .233 | 1 |
| 3B | Charlie Barber | 55 | 204 | 41 | .201 | 0 |
| SS | Ri Jones | 69 | 272 | 71 | .261 | 2 |
| OF | Bill Harbridge | 82 | 341 | 95 | .279 | 2 |
| OF | Lou Sylvester | 82 | 333 | 89 | .267 | 2 |
| OF | Bill Hawes | 79 | 349 | 97 | .278 | 4 |

==== Other batters ====
Note: G = Games played; AB = At bats; H = Hits; Avg. = Batting average; HR = Home runs

| Player | G | AB | H | Avg. | HR |
|---|---|---|---|---|---|
| Dick Burns | 79 | 350 | 107 | .306 | 4 |
| Jack Glasscock | 38 | 172 | 72 | .419 | 2 |
| Mox McQuery | 35 | 132 | 37 | .280 | 2 |
| Dan O'Leary | 32 | 132 | 34 | .258 | 1 |
| Elmer Cleveland | 29 | 115 | 37 | .322 | 0 |
| Bill Schwartz | 29 | 106 | 25 | .236 | 1 |
| Fatty Briody | 22 | 89 | 30 | .337 | 0 |
| Joe Crotty | 21 | 84 | 22 | .262 | 1 |
| Frank McLaughlin | 16 | 67 | 16 | .239 | 2 |
| Ed Kennedy | 13 | 48 | 10 | .208 | 0 |
| Fred Robinson | 3 | 13 | 3 | .231 | 0 |
| John Ewing | 1 | 4 | 0 | .000 | 0 |
| Lou Meyers | 2 | 3 | 0 | .000 | 0 |

=== Pitching ===
==== Starting pitchers ====
Note: G = Games pitched; IP = Innings pitched; W = Wins; L = Losses; ERA = Earned run average; SO = Strikeouts

| Player | G | IP | W | L | ERA | SO |
|---|---|---|---|---|---|---|
| George Bradley | 41 | 342.0 | 25 | 15 | 2.71 | 158 |
| Dick Burns | 40 | 329.2 | 23 | 15 | 2.46 | 167 |
| Jim McCormick | 24 | 210.0 | 21 | 3 | 1.54 | 161 |

==== Other pitchers ====
Note: G = Games pitched; IP = Innings pitched; W = Wins; L = Losses; ERA = Earned run average; SO = Strikeouts

| Player | G | IP | W | L | ERA | SO |
|---|---|---|---|---|---|---|
| Lou Sylvester | 6 | 32.2 | 0 | 1 | 3.58 | 7 |

== Postseason ==
The Outlaw Reds played a postseason series against the first place team in the UA, the St. Louis Maroons. The Outlaw Reds managed just four wins in sixteen games against the league champs.
