= List of Major League Baseball players (J) =

The following is a list of Major League Baseball players, retired or active. As of the end of the 2011 season, there have been 462 players with a last name that begins with J who have appeared in a major league game at some point.

== J ==
Name	Debut	Final game	Position	Teams	Ref
Ray Jablonski	April 14, 1953	September 17, 1960	Third baseman	St. Louis Cardinals, Cincinnati Redlegs, New York/San Francisco Giants, Kansas City Athletics	
Fred Jacklitsch	June 6, 1900	June 30, 1917	Catcher	Philadelphia Phillies, Brooklyn Superbas, New York Highlanders, Baltimore Terrapins, Boston Braves	
Al Jackson	May 31, 1959	September 26, 1969	Pitcher	Pittsburgh Pirates, New York Mets, St. Louis Cardinals, Cincinnati Reds	
Austin Jackson	April 5, 2010	September 30, 2018	Outfielder	Detroit Tigers, Seattle Mariners, Chicago Cubs, Chicago White Sox, Cleveland Indians, San Francisco Giants, New York Mets	
Bill Jackson	April 30, 1914	October 2, 1915	First baseman	Chicago Chi-Feds/Whales	
Bo Jackson	September 2, 1986	August 10, 1994	Outfielder	Kansas City Royals, Chicago White Sox, California Angels	
Charlie Jackson	August 20, 1915	September 26, 1917	Outfielder	Chicago White Sox, Pittsburgh Pirates	
Chuck Jackson	May 26, 1987	June 14, 1994	Third baseman	Houston Astros, Texas Rangers	
Conor Jackson	July 28, 2005	September 25, 2011	First baseman	Arizona Diamondbacks, Oakland Athletics, Boston Red Sox	
Damian Jackson	September 12, 1996	August 23, 2006	Utility infielder	Cleveland Indians, Cincinnati Reds, San Diego Padres, Detroit Tigers, Boston Red Sox, Chicago Cubs, Kansas City Royals, Washington Nationals	
Danny Jackson	September 11, 1983	August 7, 1997	Pitcher	Kansas City Royals, Cincinnati Reds, Chicago Cubs, Pittsburgh Pirates, Philadelphia Phillies, St. Louis Cardinals, San Diego Padres	
Darrell Jackson	June 16, 1978	June 1, 1982	Pitcher	Minnesota Twins	
Darrin Jackson	June 17, 1985	October 3, 1999	Outfielder	Chicago Cubs, San Diego Padres, Toronto Blue Jays, New York Mets, Chicago White Sox, Minnesota Twins, Milwaukee Brewers	
Edwin Jackson	September 9, 2003		Pitcher	Los Angeles Dodgers, Tampa Bay Devil Rays/Rays, Detroit Tigers, Arizona Diamondbacks, Chicago White Sox, St. Louis Cardinals	
George Jackson	August 2, 1911	April 19, 1913	Outfielder	Boston Rustlers/Braves	
Grant Jackson	September 3, 1965	September 8, 1982	Pitcher	Philadelphia Phillies, Baltimore Orioles, New York Yankees, Pittsburgh Pirates, Montreal Expos, Kansas City Royals	
Henry Jackson	September 13, 1887	September 28, 1887	First baseman	Indianapolis Hoosiers (NL)	
Herb Jackson	August 11, 1905	August 14, 1905	Pitcher	Detroit Tigers	
Jim Jackson	April 26, 1901	September 28, 1906	Outfielder	Baltimore Orioles, New York Giants, Cleveland Naps	
John Jackson	June 20, 1933	August 2, 1933	Pitcher	Philadelphia Phillies	
Ken Jackson	September 12, 1987	October 3, 1987	Shortstop	Philadelphia Phillies	
Larry Jackson	April 17, 1955	September 27, 1968	Pitcher	St. Louis Cardinals, Chicago Cubs, Philadelphia Phillies	
Lou Jackson	July 23, 1958	May 11, 1964	Outfielder	Chicago Cubs, Baltimore Orioles	
Mike Jackson (LHP)	May 10, 1970	July 27, 1973	Pitcher	Philadelphia Phillies, St. Louis Cardinals, Kansas City Royals, Cleveland Indians	
Mike Jackson (RHP)	August 11, 1986	August 29, 2004	Pitcher	Philadelphia Phillies, Seattle Mariners, San Francisco Giants, Cincinnati Reds, Cleveland Indians, Houston Astros, Minnesota Twins, Chicago White Sox	
Randy Jackson	May 2, 1950	September 25, 1959	Third baseman	Chicago Cubs, Brooklyn/Los Angeles Dodgers, Cleveland Indians	
Reggie Jackson β	June 9, 1967	October 4, 1987	Outfielder	Kansas City/Oakland Athletics, Baltimore Orioles, New York Yankees, California Angels	
Ron Jackson (1950s 1B)	June 15, 1954	May 15, 1960	First baseman	Chicago White Sox, Boston Red Sox	
Ron Jackson (1970s 1B)	September 12, 1975	September 29, 1984	First baseman	California Angels, Minnesota Twins, Detroit Tigers, Baltimore Orioles	
Roy Lee Jackson	September 13, 1977	October 1, 1986	Pitcher	New York Mets, Toronto Blue Jays, San Diego Padres, Minnesota Twins	
Ryan Jackson	March 31, 1998	June 18, 2002	First baseman	Florida Marlins, Seattle Mariners, Detroit Tigers	
Sam Jackson	May 9, 1871	May 7, 1872	Second baseman	Boston Red Stockings, Brooklyn Atlantics	
Shoeless Joe Jackson	August 25, 1908	September 27, 1920	Outfielder	Philadelphia Athletics, Cleveland Naps/Indians, Chicago White Sox	
Sonny Jackson	September 27, 1963	July 9, 1974	Shortstop	Houston Colt .45s/Astros, Atlanta Braves	
Steven Jackson	June 1, 2009		Pitcher	Pittsburgh Pirates	
Travis Jackson β	September 27, 1922	September 24, 1936	Shortstop	New York Giants	
Zach Jackson	June 4, 2006		Pitcher	Milwaukee Brewers, Cleveland Indians	
Art Jacobs	June 18, 1939	June 18, 1939	Pitcher	Cincinnati Reds	
Bucky Jacobs	June 27, 1937	June 1, 1940	Pitcher	Washington Senators	
Elmer Jacobs	April 23, 1914	September 13, 1927	Pitcher	Philadelphia Phillies, Pittsburgh Pirates, St. Louis Cardinals, Chicago Cubs, Chicago White Sox	
Jake Jacobs	September 13, 1960	September 28, 1961	Outfielder	Washington Senators/Minnesota Twins	
Mike Jacobs (SS)	July 16, 1902	July 22, 1902	Shortstop	Chicago Cubs	
Mike Jacobs (1B)	August 21, 2005		First baseman	New York Mets, Florida Marlins, Kansas City Royals	
Otto Jacobs	June 13, 1918	August 24, 1918	Catcher	Chicago White Sox	
Ray Jacobs	April 20, 1928	May 2, 1928	Pinch hitter	Chicago Cubs	
Spook Jacobs	April 13, 1954	July 3, 1956	Second baseman	Philadelphia/Kansas City Athletics, Pittsburgh Pirates	
Tony Jacobs	September 19, 1948	April 12, 1955	Pitcher	Chicago Cubs, St. Louis Cardinals	
Bucky Jacobsen	July 16, 2004	September 5, 2004	First baseman	Seattle Mariners	
Baby Doll Jacobson	April 14, 1915	September 22, 1927	Outfielder	Detroit Tigers, St. Louis Browns, Boston Red Sox, Cleveland Indians, Philadelphia Athletics	
Beany Jacobson	April 30, 1904	June 24, 1907	Pitcher	Washington Senators, St. Louis Browns, Boston Red Sox	
Merwin Jacobson	September 8, 1915	May 21, 1927	Outfielder	New York Giants, Chicago Cubs, Brooklyn Robins	
Larry Jacobus	July 15, 1918	August 1, 1918	Pitcher	Cincinnati Reds	
Brook Jacoby	September 13, 1981	October 4, 1992	Third baseman	Atlanta Braves, Cleveland Indians, Oakland Athletics	
Harry Jacoby	May 2, 1882	September 19, 1885	Utility player	Baltimore Orioles (AA)	
Jason Jacome	July 2, 1994	September 23, 1998	Pitcher	New York Mets, Kansas City Royals, Cleveland Indians	
Pat Jacquez	April 18, 1971	April 25, 1971	Pitcher	Chicago White Sox	
Tom Jacquez	September 9, 2000	September 30, 2000	Pitcher	Philadelphia Phillies	
Jake Jaeckel	September 19, 1964	October 2, 1964	Pitcher	Chicago Cubs	
Charlie Jaeger	September 9, 1904	October 7, 1904	Pitcher	Detroit Tigers	
Joe Jaeger	July 28, 1920	September 6, 1920	Pitcher	Chicago Cubs	
John Jaha	July 9, 1992	June 27, 2001	First baseman	Milwaukee Brewers, Oakland Athletics	
Art Jahn	July 2, 1925	September 17, 1928	Outfielder	Chicago Cubs, New York Giants, Philadelphia Phillies	
Chris Jakubauskas	April 8, 2009		Pitcher	Seattle Mariners, Pittsburgh Pirates, Baltimore Orioles	
Sig Jakucki	August 30, 1936	August 29, 1945	Pitcher	St. Louis Browns	
Lefty Jamerson	August 16, 1924	August 16, 1924	Pitcher	Boston Red Sox	
Art James	April 10, 1975	August 4, 1975	Outfielder	Detroit Tigers	
Bernie James	April 24, 1929	October 1, 1933	Second baseman	Boston Braves, New York Giants	
Bert James	September 18, 1909	September 23, 1909	Outfielder	St. Louis Cardinals	
Big Bill James	June 12, 1911	September 17, 1919	Pitcher	Cleveland Naps, St. Louis Browns, Detroit Tigers, Boston Red Sox, Chicago White Sox	
Seattle Bill James	April 17, 1913	June 4, 1919	Pitcher	Boston Braves	
Bob James	September 7, 1978	October 2, 1987	Pitcher	Montreal Expos, Detroit Tigers, Chicago White Sox	
Charlie James	August 2, 1960	September 27, 1965	Outfielder	St. Louis Cardinals, Cincinnati Reds	
Chris James	April 23, 1986	October 1, 1995	Outfielder	Philadelphia Phillies, San Diego Padres, Cleveland Indians, San Francisco Giants, Houston Astros, Texas Rangers, Kansas City Royals, Boston Red Sox	
Chuck James	September 28, 2005		Pitcher	Atlanta Braves, Minnesota Twins	
Cleo James	April 15, 1968	September 26, 1973	Outfielder	Los Angeles Dodgers, Chicago Cubs	
Delvin James	April 16, 2002	September 29, 2002	Pitcher	Tampa Bay Devil Rays	
Dion James	September 16, 1983	April 21, 1996	Outfielder	Milwaukee Brewers, Atlanta Braves, Cleveland Indians, New York Yankees	
Jeff James	April 13, 1968	October 1, 1969	Pitcher	Philadelphia Phillies	
Johnny James	September 6, 1958	October 1, 1961	Pitcher	Los Angeles Angels	
Justin James	September 2, 2010	September 27, 2010	Pitcher	Oakland Athletics	
Lefty James	September 20, 1912	July 3, 1914	Pitcher	Cleveland Naps	
Mike James	April 29, 1995	May 5, 2002	Pitcher	California/Anaheim Angels, St. Louis Cardinals, Colorado Rockies	
Rick James	September 20, 1967	October 1, 1967	Pitcher	Chicago Cubs	
Skip James	September 12, 1977	September 23, 1978	First baseman	San Francisco Giants	
Charlie Jamieson	September 20, 1915	July 17, 1932	Outfielder	Washington Senators, Philadelphia Athletics, Cleveland Indians	
Gerry Janeski	April 10, 1970	May 28, 1972	Pitcher	Chicago White Sox, Washington Senators/Texas Rangers	
Paul Janish	May 14, 2008		Shortstop	Cincinnati Reds	
Vic Janowicz	May 31, 1953	September 10, 1954	Catcher	Pittsburgh Pirates	
Kenley Jansen	July 24, 2010		Pitcher	Los Angeles Dodgers	
Larry Jansen	April 17, 1947	September 25, 1956	Pitcher	New York Giants, Cincinnati Reds	
Ray Jansen	September 30, 1910	September 30, 1910	Third baseman	St. Louis Browns	
Casey Janssen	April 27, 2006		Pitcher	Toronto Blue Jays	
Heinie Jantzen	June 29, 1912	September 13, 1912	Outfielder	St. Louis Browns	
Hal Janvrin	July 9, 1911	October 1, 1922	Utility infielder	Boston Red Sox, Washington Senators, St. Louis Cardinals, Brooklyn Robins	
Marty Janzen	May 12, 1996	September 27, 1997	Pitcher	Toronto Blue Jays	
Jason Jaramillo	April 16, 2009		Catcher	Pittsburgh Pirates	
Kevin Jarvis	April 6, 1994	September 24, 2006	Pitcher	Cincinnati Reds, Minnesota Twins, Detroit Tigers, Oakland Athletics, Colorado Rockies, San Diego Padres, Seattle Mariners, St. Louis Cardinals, Arizona Diamondbacks, Boston Red Sox	
Pat Jarvis	August 4, 1966	September 23, 1973	Pitcher	Atlanta Braves, Montreal Expos	
Ray Jarvis	April 15, 1969	September 13, 1970	Pitcher	Boston Red Sox	
Roy Jarvis	April 30, 1944	September 14, 1947	Catcher	Brooklyn Dodgers, Pittsburgh Pirates	
John Jaso	September 6, 2008		Catcher	Tampa Bay Rays	
Hi Jasper	April 19, 1914	August 21, 1919	Pitcher	Chicago White Sox, St. Louis Cardinals, Cleveland Indians	
Larry Jaster	September 17, 1965	October 4, 1972	Pitcher	St. Louis Cardinals, Montreal Expos, Atlanta Braves	
Paul Jata	April 19, 1972	October 4, 1972	Utility player	Detroit Tigers	
Al Javery	April 23, 1940	May 8, 1946	Pitcher	Boston Bees/Braves	
Al Javier	September 9, 1976	October 1, 1976	Outfielder	Houston Astros	
Julián Javier	May 28, 1960	October 1, 1972	Second baseman	St. Louis Cardinals, Cincinnati Reds	
Stan Javier	April 15, 1984	October 6, 2001	Outfielder	New York Yankees, Oakland Athletics, Los Angeles Dodgers, Philadelphia Phillies, California Angels, San Francisco Giants, Houston Astros, Seattle Mariners	
Joey Jay	July 21, 1953	October 2, 1966	Pitcher	Milwaukee Braves, Cincinnati Reds, Atlanta Braves	
Jon Jay	April 26, 2010		Outfielder	St. Louis Cardinals, San Diego Padres	
Domingo Jean	August 8, 1993	October 3, 1993	Pitcher	New York Yankees	
Tex Jeanes	April 20, 1921	June 26, 1927	Outfielder	Cleveland Indians, Washington Senators, New York Giants	
George Jeffcoat	April 20, 1936	June 20, 1943	Pitcher	Brooklyn Dodgers, Boston Braves	
Hal Jeffcoat	April 20, 1948	August 6, 1959	Outfielder	Chicago Cubs, Cincinnati Redlegs, St. Louis Cardinals	
Mike Jeffcoat	August 21, 1983	June 24, 1994	Pitcher	Cleveland Indians, San Francisco Giants, Texas Rangers, Florida Marlins	
Gregg Jefferies	September 6, 1987	May 29, 2000	Utility player	New York Mets, Kansas City Royals, St. Louis Cardinals, Philadelphia Phillies, Anaheim Angels, Detroit Tigers	
Jesse Jefferson	June 23, 1973	September 30, 1981	Pitcher	Baltimore Orioles, Chicago White Sox, Toronto Blue Jays, Pittsburgh Pirates, California Angels	
Reggie Jefferson	May 18, 1991	October 3, 1999	First baseman	Cincinnati Reds, Cleveland Indians, Seattle Mariners, Boston Red Sox	
Stan Jefferson	September 7, 1986	October 1, 1991	Outfielder	New York Mets, San Diego Padres, New York Yankees, Baltimore Orioles, Cleveland Indians, Cincinnati Reds	
Jeremy Jeffress	September 1, 2010		Pitcher	Milwaukee Brewers, Kansas City Royals	
Irv Jeffries	April 30, 1930	July 4, 1934	Utility infielder	Chicago White Sox, Philadelphia Phillies	
Chris Jelic	September 30, 1990	October 3, 1990	Outfielder	New York Mets	
Frank Jelincich	September 6, 1941	September 25, 1941	Outfielder	Chicago Cubs	
Greg Jelks	August 20, 1987	October 3, 1987	Third baseman	Philadelphia Phillies	
Steve Jeltz	July 17, 1983	October 3, 1990	Shortstop	Philadelphia Phillies, Kansas City Royals	
Ferguson Jenkins β	September 10, 1965	September 26, 1983	Pitcher	Philadelphia Phillies, Chicago Cubs, Texas Rangers, Boston Red Sox	
Geoff Jenkins	April 24, 1998	September 28, 2008	Outfielder	Milwaukee Brewers, Philadelphia Phillies	
Jack Jenkins	September 13, 1962	September 30, 1969	Pitcher	Washington Senators (1961–71), Los Angeles Dodgers	
Joe Jenkins	April 30, 1914	September 27, 1919	Catcher	St. Louis Browns, Chicago White Sox	
John Jenkins	August 5, 1922	August 23, 1922	Utility infielder	Chicago White Sox	
Tom Jenkins	September 15, 1925	June 26, 1932	Outfielder	Boston Red Sox, Philadelphia Athletics, St. Louis Browns	
Bobby Jenks	July 6, 2005		Pitcher	Chicago White Sox, Boston Red Sox	
Alamazoo Jennings	August 15, 1878	August 15, 1878	Catcher	Milwaukee Grays	
Bill Jennings	July 19, 1951	September 30, 1951	Shortstop	St. Louis Browns	
Desmond Jennings	September 1, 2010		Outfielder	Tampa Bay Rays	
Doug Jennings	April 8, 1988	September 26, 1993	Outfielder	Oakland Athletics, Chicago Cubs	
Hughie Jennings β	June 1, 1891	September 2, 1918	Shortstop	Louisville Colonels, Baltimore Orioles (NL), Brooklyn Superbas, Philadelphia Phillies, Detroit Tigers	
Jason Jennings	August 23, 2001		Pitcher	Colorado Rockies, Houston Astros, Texas Rangers	
Robin Jennings	April 18, 1996	October 7, 2001	Outfielder	Chicago Cubs, Oakland Athletics, Colorado Rockies, Cincinnati Reds	
Jackie Jensen	April 18, 1950	October 1, 1961	Outfielder	New York Yankees, Washington Senators, Boston Red Sox	
Marcus Jensen	April 14, 1996	June 23, 2002	Catcher	San Francisco Giants, Detroit Tigers, Milwaukee Brewers, St. Louis Cardinals, Minnesota Twins, Boston Red Sox, Texas Rangers	
Ryan Jensen	May 19, 2001	July 9, 2005	Pitcher	San Francisco Giants, Kansas City Royals	
Willie Jensen	September 10, 1912	October 2, 1914	Pitcher	Detroit Tigers, Philadelphia Athletics	
Woody Jensen	April 20, 1931	June 4, 1939	Outfielder	Pittsburgh Pirates	
Kevin Jepsen	September 8, 2008		Pitcher	Los Angeles Angels of Anaheim	
Mike Jerzembeck	August 8, 1998	September 23, 1998	Pitcher	New York Yankees	
Dan Jessee	August 14, 1929	August 14, 1929	Pinch runner	Cleveland Indians	
Garry Jestadt	September 17, 1969	October 4, 1972	Utility infielder	Montreal Expos, Chicago Cubs, San Diego Padres	
Virgil Jester	June 18, 1952	April 23, 1953	Pitcher	Boston/Milwaukee Braves	
Derek Jeter	May 29, 1995		Shortstop	New York Yankees	
Johnny Jeter	June 14, 1969	September 14, 1974	Outfielder	Pittsburgh Pirates, San Diego Padres, Chicago White Sox, Cleveland Indians	
Shawn Jeter	June 13, 1992	October 4, 1992	Outfielder	Chicago White Sox	
Sam Jethroe	April 18, 1950	April 15, 1954	Outfielder	Boston Braves, Pittsburgh Pirates	
Nat Jewett	July 4, 1872	July 6, 1872	Catcher	Eckford of Brooklyn	
César Jiménez	September 11, 2006		Pitcher	Seattle Mariners	
D'Angelo Jiménez	September 15, 1999	September 29, 2007	Second baseman	New York Yankees, San Diego Padres, Chicago White Sox, Cincinnati Reds, Texas Rangers, Oakland Athletics, Washington Nationals	
Elvio Jiménez	October 4, 1964	October 4, 1964	Outfielder	New York Yankees	
Germán Jiménez	June 28, 1988	October 1, 1988	Pitcher	Atlanta Braves	
Houston Jiménez	June 13, 1983	September 12, 1988	Shortstop	Minnesota Twins, Pittsburgh Pirates, Cleveland Indians	
Jason Jiménez	June 3, 2002	September 28, 2002	Pitcher	Tampa Bay Devil Rays, Detroit Tigers	
Jose Jimenez	September 9, 1998	July 5, 2004	Pitcher	St. Louis Cardinals, Colorado Rockies, Cleveland Indians	
Juan Jiménez	September 9, 1974	September 29, 1974	Pitcher	Pittsburgh Pirates	
Kelvin Jiménez	April 27, 2007	September 28, 2008	Pitcher	St. Louis Cardinals	
Manny Jiménez	April 11, 1962	May 27, 1969	Outfielder	Kansas City Athletics, Pittsburgh Pirates, Chicago Cubs	
Miguel Jimenez	September 12, 1993	June 4, 1994	Pitcher	Oakland Athletics	
Ubaldo Jiménez	September 26, 2006		Pitcher	Colorado Rockies, Cleveland Indians	
Charlton Jimerson	September 14, 2005	April 10, 2008	Outfielder	Houston Astros, Seattle Mariners	
Waldis Joaquín	August 4, 2009		Pitcher	San Francisco Giants	
Brett Jodie	July 20, 2001	October 7, 2001	Pitcher	New York Yankees, San Diego Padres	
Kenji Johjima	April 3, 2006	October 3, 2009	Catcher	Seattle Mariners	
Tommy John	September 6, 1963	May 25, 1989	Pitcher	Cleveland Indians, Chicago White Sox, Los Angeles Dodgers, New York Yankees, California Angels, Oakland Athletics	
Augie Johns	April 16, 1926	April 23, 1927	Pitcher	Detroit Tigers	
Doug Johns	July 8, 1995	October 2, 1999	Pitcher	Oakland Athletics, Baltimore Orioles	
Keith Johns	May 23, 1998	May 26, 1998	Second baseman	Boston Red Sox	
Ollie Johns	September 24, 1905	September 30, 1905	Pitcher	Cincinnati Reds	
Pete Johns	August 25, 1915	September 1, 1918	Third baseman	Chicago White Sox, St. Louis Browns	
Tommy Johns	May 14, 1873	May 14, 1873	Outfielder	Baltimore Marylands	
Abbie Johnson	September 1, 1896	August 12, 1897	Second baseman	Louisville Colonels	
Abe Johnson	July 16, 1893	July 16, 1893	Pitcher	Chicago Colts	
Adam Johnson	July 16, 2001	September 28, 2003	Pitcher	Minnesota Twins	
Alan Johnson	April 17, 2011		Pitcher	Colorado Rockies	
Alex Johnson	July 25, 1964	October 1, 1976	Outfielder	Philadelphia Phillies, St. Louis Cardinals, Cincinnati Reds, California Angels, Texas Rangers, New York Yankees, Detroit Tigers	
Art Johnson (1920s P)	September 18, 1927	September 18, 1927	Pitcher	San Francisco Giants	
Art Johnson (1940s P)	September 22, 1940	September 19, 1942	Pitcher	Boston Bees/Braves	
Bart Johnson	September 8, 1969	September 21, 1977	Pitcher	Chicago White Sox	
Ben Johnson (P)	September 6, 1959	June 12, 1960	Pitcher	Chicago Cubs	
Ben Johnson (OF)	June 26, 2005	June 10, 2007	Outfielder	San Diego Padres, New York Mets	
Bill Johnson (1890s OF)	June 27, 1884	April 27, 1892	Outfielder	Philadelphia Keystones, Indianapolis Hoosiers (NL), Baltimore Orioles (AA/NL)	
Bill Johnson (1910s OF)	September 22, 1916	July 4, 1917	Outfielder	Philadelphia Athletics	
Bill Johnson (P)	September 6, 1983	September 29, 1984	Pitcher	Chicago Cubs	
Billy Johnson	April 22, 1943	May 10, 1953	Third baseman	New York Yankees, St. Louis Cardinals	
Bob Johnson (OF)	April 12, 1933	September 23, 1945	Outfielder	Philadelphia Athletics, Washington Senators, Boston Red Sox	
Bob Johnson (IF)	April 19, 1960	June 20, 1970	Utility infielder	Kansas City Athletics, Washington Senators (1961–71), Baltimore Orioles, New York Mets, Cincinnati Reds, Atlanta Braves, St. Louis Cardinals, Oakland Athletics	
Bob Johnson (P)	September 19, 1969	June 5, 1977	Pitcher	New York Mets, Kansas City Royals, Pittsburgh Pirates, Cleveland Indians, Atlanta Braves	
Bob Johnson (C)	September 1, 1981	October 1, 1983	Catcher	Texas Rangers	
Brian Johnson	April 5, 1994	September 21, 2001	Catcher	San Diego Padres, Detroit Tigers, San Francisco Giants, Cincinnati Reds, Kansas City Royals, Los Angeles Dodgers	
William Johnson	May 20, 1871	September 12, 1871	Second baseman	Cleveland Forest Citys	
Charles Johnson	May 6, 1994	June 11, 2005	Catcher	Florida Marlins, Los Angeles Dodgers, Baltimore Orioles, Chicago White Sox, Colorado Rockies, Tampa Bay Devil Rays	
Charlie Johnson	September 21, 1908	October 7, 1908	Outfielder	Philadelphia Phillies	
Chet Johnson	September 12, 1946	September 29, 1946	Pitcher	St. Louis Browns	
Chief Johnson	April 16, 1913	September 30, 1915	Pitcher	Cincinnati Reds, Kansas City Packers	
Chris Johnson	September 9, 2009		Third baseman	Houston Astros	
Cliff Johnson	September 13, 1972	September 30, 1986	Utility player	Houston Astros, New York Yankees, Cleveland Indians, Chicago Cubs, Oakland Athletics, Toronto Blue Jays, Texas Rangers	
Connie Johnson	April 17, 1953	September 14, 1958	Pitcher	Chicago White Sox, Baltimore Orioles	
Dan Johnson	May 27, 2005		First baseman	Oakland Athletics, Tampa Bay Rays	
Dane Johnson	May 30, 1994	August 31, 1997	Pitcher	Chicago White Sox, Toronto Blue Jays, Oakland Athletics	
Darrell Johnson	April 20, 1952	June 6, 1962	Catcher	St. Louis Browns, Chicago White Sox, New York Yankees, St. Louis Cardinals, Philadelphia Phillies, Cincinnati Reds, Baltimore Orioles	
Dave Johnson (1970s P)	July 2, 1974	May 10, 1978	Pitcher	Baltimore Orioles, Minnesota Twins	
Dave Johnson (1987–93 P)	May 29, 1987	September 19, 1993	Pitcher	Pittsburgh Pirates, Baltimore Orioles, Detroit Tigers	
Davey Johnson	April 13, 1965	September 29, 1978	Second baseman	Baltimore Orioles, Atlanta Braves, Philadelphia Phillies, Chicago Cubs	
Deron Johnson	September 20, 1960	May 28, 1976	First baseman	New York Yankees, Kansas City Athletics, Cincinnati Reds, Atlanta Braves, Philadelphia Phillies, Oakland Athletics, Milwaukee Brewers, Boston Red Sox, Chicago White Sox	
Don Johnson (2B)	September 26, 1943	May 16, 1948	Pitcher	Chicago Cubs	
Don Johnson (P)	April 20, 1947	September 24, 1958	Pitcher	New York Yankees, St. Louis Browns, Washington Senators, Chicago White Sox, Baltimore Orioles, San Francisco Giants	
Earl Johnson	July 20, 1940	June 3, 1941	Pitcher	Boston Red Sox, Detroit Tigers	
Ed Johnson	September 26, 1920	October 3, 1920	Outfielder	Washington Senators	
Elliot Johnson	April 5, 2008		Shortstop	Tampa Bay Rays	
Ellis Johnson	September 22, 1912	October 2, 1917	Pitcher	Chicago White Sox, Philadelphia Athletics	
Elmer Johnson	April 24, 1914	October 6, 1914	Catcher	New York Giants	
Erik Johnson	July 8, 1993	May 28, 1994	Second baseman	San Francisco Giants	
Ernie Johnson (P)	August 5, 1912	September 28, 1925	Pitcher	Chicago White Sox, St. Louis Terriers, St. Louis Browns, New York Yankees	
Ernie Johnson (SS)	April 28, 1950	September 12, 1959	Shortstop	Boston/Milwaukee Braves, Baltimore Orioles	
Footer Johnson	June 15, 1958	July 30, 1958	Pinch hitter	Chicago Cubs	
Frank Johnson	September 7, 1966	June 12, 1971	Outfielder	San Francisco Giants	
Fred Johnson	September 27, 1922	May 10, 1939	Pitcher	New York Giants, St. Louis Browns	
Gary Johnson	April 26, 2003	May 8, 2003	Outfielder	Anaheim Angels	
Hank Johnson	April 17, 1925	September 19, 1939	Pitcher	New York Yankees, Boston Red Sox, Philadelphia Athletics, Cincinnati Reds	
Howard Johnson	April 14, 1982	October 1, 1995	Third baseman	Detroit Tigers, New York Mets, Colorado Rockies, Chicago Cubs	
Jason Johnson	August 27, 1997	September 26, 2008	Pitcher	Pittsburgh Pirates, Tampa Bay Devil Rays, Baltimore Orioles, Detroit Tigers, Cleveland Indians, Boston Red Sox, Cincinnati Reds, Los Angeles Dodgers	
Jeff Johnson	June 5, 1991	June 12, 1993	Pitcher	New York Yankees	
Jerry Johnson	July 17, 1968	September 29, 1977	Pitcher	Philadelphia Phillies, St. Louis Cardinals, San Francisco Giants, Cleveland Indians, Houston Astros, San Diego Padres, Toronto Blue Jays	
Jim Johnson (LHP)	April 13, 1970	April 18, 1970	Pitcher	San Francisco Giants	
Jim Johnson (RHP)	July 29, 2006		Pitcher	Baltimore Orioles	
Jing Johnson	June 27, 1916	May 25, 1928	Pitcher	Philadelphia Athletics	
Joe Johnson	July 25, 1985	June 21, 1987	Pitcher	Atlanta Braves, Toronto Blue Jays	
John Henry Johnson	April 10, 1978	June 29, 1987	Pitcher	Oakland Athletics, Texas Rangers, Boston Red Sox, Milwaukee Brewers	
Johnny Johnson	April 19, 1944	September 25, 1945	Pitcher	New York Yankees, Chicago White Sox	
Jonathan Johnson	September 27, 1998	June 13, 2003	Pitcher	Texas Rangers, San Diego Padres, Houston Astros	
Josh Johnson	September 10, 2005		Pitcher	Florida Marlins	
Keith Johnson	April 17, 2000	August 9, 2000	Utility infielder	Anaheim Angels	
Kelly Johnson	May 29, 2005		Second baseman	Atlanta Braves, Arizona Diamondbacks, Toronto Blue Jays	
Ken Johnson (LHP)	September 18, 1947	July 15, 1952	Pitcher	St. Louis Cardinals, Philadelphia Phillies, Detroit Tigers	
Ken Johnson (RHP)	September 13, 1958	April 18, 1970	Pitcher	Kansas City Athletics, Cincinnati Reds, Cincinnati Reds, Houston Colt .45s/Astros, Milwaukee/Atlanta Braves, New York Yankees, Chicago Cubs, Montreal Expos	
Lamar Johnson	May 18, 1974	October 2, 1982	First baseman	Chicago White Sox, Texas Rangers	
Lance Johnson	July 10, 1987	May 27, 2000	Outfielder	St. Louis Cardinals, Chicago White Sox, New York Mets, Chicago Cubs, New York Yankees	
Larry Johnson	October 3, 1972	May 25, 1978	Catcher	Cleveland Indians, Montreal Expos, Chicago White Sox	
Lloyd Johnson	April 21, 1934	April 21, 1934	Pitcher	Pittsburgh Pirates	
Lou Johnson (OF)	September 11, 1894	September 26, 1894	Outfielder	Philadelphia Phillies	
Lou Johnson (P)	April 17, 1960	September 6, 1969	Pitcher	Chicago Cubs, Los Angeles Angels, Milwaukee Braves, Los Angeles Dodgers, Cleveland Indians, California Angels	
Mark Johnson (1B)	April 26, 1995	June 2, 2002	First baseman	Pittsburgh Pirates, Anaheim Angels, New York Mets	
Mark Johnson (C)	September 14, 1998	September 27, 2008	Catcher	Chicago White Sox, Oakland Athletics, Milwaukee Brewers, St. Louis Cardinals	
Mark Johnson	April 7, 2000	June 24, 2000	Pitcher	Detroit Tigers	
Mike Johnson (1970s P)	July 25, 1974	October 2, 1974	Pitcher	San Francisco Giants	
Mike Johnson (1990s P)	April 6, 1997	April 24, 2001	Pitcher	Baltimore Orioles, Montreal Expos	
Nick Johnson	August 21, 2001		First baseman	New York Yankees, Montreal Expos/Washington Nationals, Florida Marlins	
Otis Johnson	April 12, 1911	September 21, 1911	Shortstop	New York Highlanders	
Paul Johnson	September 13, 1920	October 2, 1921	Outfielder	Philadelphia Athletics	
Randy Johnson (DH)	July 5, 1980	October 3, 1982	Designated hitter	Chicago White Sox, Minnesota Twins	
Randy Johnson (3B)	April 27, 1982	September 30, 1984	Third baseman	Atlanta Braves	
Randy Johnson (P)	September 15, 1988	October 4, 2009	Pitcher	Montreal Expos, Seattle Mariners, Houston Astros, Arizona Diamondbacks, New York Yankees, San Francisco Giants	
Rankin Johnson Sr.	April 20, 1914	July 16, 1918	Pitcher	Boston Red Sox, Chicago Whales, Baltimore Terrapins, St. Louis Cardinals	
Rankin Johnson Jr.	April 17, 1941	May 12, 1941	Pitcher	Philadelphia Athletics	
Reed Johnson	April 17, 2003		Outfielder	Toronto Blue Jays, Chicago Cubs, Los Angeles Dodgers	
Rob Johnson	September 4, 2007		Catcher	Seattle Mariners, San Diego Padres	
Ron Johnson	September 12, 1982	June 22, 1984	First baseman	Kansas City Royals, Montreal Expos	
Rondin Johnson	September 3, 1986	October 5, 1986	Second baseman	Kansas City Royals	
Rontrez Johnson	March 31, 2003	April 15, 2003	Outfielder	Kansas City Royals	
Roy Johnson (P)	August 7, 1918	September 2, 1918	Pitcher	Philadelphia Athletics	
Roy Johnson (1930s OF)	April 18, 1929	April 27, 1938	Outfielder	Detroit Tigers, Boston Red Sox, New York Yankees, Boston Bees	
Roy Johnson (1980s OF)	July 3, 1982	April 14, 1985	Outfielder	Montreal Expos	
Russ Johnson	April 8, 1997	July 15, 2005	Third baseman	Houston Astros, Tampa Bay Devil Rays, New York Yankees	
Si Johnson	September 11, 1928	September 25, 1947	Pitcher	Cincinnati Reds, St. Louis Cardinals, Philadelphia Phillies, Boston Braves	
Spud Johnson	April 18, 1889	August 8, 1891	Outfielder	Columbus Solons, Cleveland Spiders	
Stan Johnson	September 18, 1960	June 13, 1961	Outfielder	Chicago White Sox, Kansas City Athletics	
Syl Johnson	April 24, 1922	September 26, 1940	Pitcher	Detroit Tigers, St. Louis Cardinals, Cincinnati Reds, Philadelphia Phillies	
Tim Johnson	April 24, 1973	September 28, 1979	Utility infielder	Milwaukee Brewers, Toronto Blue Jays	
Tom Johnson	September 10, 1974	September 27, 1978	Pitcher	Minnesota Twins	
Tony Johnson	September 27, 1981	October 3, 1982	Outfielder	Montreal Expos, Toronto Blue Jays	
Tyler Johnson	September 6, 2005	September 30, 2007	Pitcher	St. Louis Cardinals	
Vic Johnson	May 3, 1944	June 11, 1946	Pitcher	Boston Red Sox, Cleveland Indians	
Wallace Johnson	September 8, 1981	August 3, 1990	First baseman	Montreal Expos, San Francisco Giants	
Walter Johnson β	August 2, 1907	September 30, 1927	Pitcher	Washington Senators	
Youngy Johnson	April 29, 1897	September 16, 1899	Pitcher	Philadelphia Phillies, New York Giants	
Dick Johnston	August 12, 1884	August 16, 1891	Outfielder	Richmond Virginians, Boston Beaneaters, Boston Reds (1890–91), New York Giants (PL), Cincinnati Kelly's Killers	
Doc Johnston	October 3, 1909	September 30, 1922	First baseman	Cincinnati Reds, Cleveland Naps, Pittsburgh Pirates, Cleveland Indians, Philadelphia Athletics	
Fred Johnston	June 29, 1924	August 10, 1924	Utility infielder	Brooklyn Robins	
Greg Johnston	July 27, 1979	April 27, 1981	Outfielder	San Francisco Giants, Minnesota Twins	
Jimmy Johnston	May 3, 1911	September 11, 1926	Utility player	Chicago White Sox, Chicago Cubs, Brooklyn Robins, Boston Braves, New York Giants	
Joel Johnston	September 5, 1991	May 12, 1995	Pitcher	Kansas City Royals, Pittsburgh Pirates, Boston Red Sox	
Johnny Johnston	April 10, 1913	September 4, 1913	Outfielder	St. Louis Browns	
Mike Johnston	April 7, 2004	June 24, 2005	Pitcher	Pittsburgh Pirates	
Rex Johnston	April 15, 1964	May 11, 1964	Outfielder	Pittsburgh Pirates	
Jay Johnstone	July 30, 1966	October 6, 1985	Outfielder	California Angels, Chicago White Sox, Oakland Athletics, Philadelphia Phillies, New York Yankees, San Diego Padres, Los Angeles Dodgers, Chicago Cubs	
John Johnstone	September 3, 1993	September 30, 2000	Pitcher	Florida Marlins, Houston Astros, San Francisco Giants, Oakland Athletics	
Roy Joiner	April 30, 1934	September 15, 1940	Pitcher	Chicago Cubs, New York Giants	
Stan Jok	April 13, 1954	May 8, 1955	Third baseman	Philadelphia Phillies, Chicago White Sox	
Smead Jolley	April 17, 1930	October 1, 1933	Outfielder	Chicago White Sox, Boston Red Sox	
Dave Jolly	May 9, 1953	September 14, 1957	Pitcher	Milwaukee Braves	
Jones, first name unknown (OF)	July 14, 1884	July 18, 1884	Outfielder	Washington Nationals (AA)	
Jones, first name unknown (3B)	April 30, 1885	April 30, 1885	Third baseman	New York Metropolitans	
Adam Jones	July 14, 2006		Outfielder	Seattle Mariners, Baltimore Orioles	
Al Jones	August 6, 1983	September 30, 1985	Pitcher	Chicago White Sox	
Alex Jones	September 25, 1889	May 16, 1903	Pitcher	Pittsburgh Alleghenys, Louisville Colonels, Washington Senators (NL), Philadelphia Phillies, Detroit Tigers	
Andruw Jones	August 15, 1996		Outfielder	Atlanta Braves, Los Angeles Dodgers, Texas Rangers, Chicago White Sox, New York Yankees	
Art Jones	April 23, 1932	April 23, 1932	Pitcher	Brooklyn Dodgers	
Barry Jones	April 20, 1986	May 22, 1993	Pitcher	Pittsburgh Pirates, Chicago White Sox, Montreal Expos, Philadelphia Phillies, New York Mets	
Bill Jones (C)	July 17, 1884	July 23, 1884	Catcher	Philadelphia Keystones	
Bill Jones (OF)	June 20, 1911	June 8, 1912	Outfielder	Boston Rustlers/Braves	
Binky Jones	April 15, 1924	April 27, 1924	Shortstop	Brooklyn Robins	
Bob Jones	April 11, 1917	September 24, 1925	Third baseman	Detroit Tigers	
Bobby Jones (OF)	October 1, 1974	July 5, 1986	Outfielder	Texas Rangers, California Angels	
Bobby Jones (RHP)	August 14, 1993	September 2, 2002	Pitcher	New York Mets, San Diego Padres	
Bobby Jones (LHP)	May 18, 1997	April 11, 2004	Pitcher	Colorado Rockies, New York Mets, San Diego Padres, Boston Red Sox	
Brandon Jones	September 16, 2007		Outfielder	Atlanta Braves	
Broadway Jones	July 4, 1923	July 13, 1923	Pitcher	Philadelphia Phillies	
Bumpus Jones	October 15, 1892	July 14, 1893	Pitcher	Cincinnati Reds, New York Giants	
Calvin Jones	June 14, 1991	October 1, 1992	Pitcher	Seattle Mariners	
Charley Jones	May 4, 1875	April 26, 1888	Outfielder	Keokuk Westerns, Hartford Dark Blues, Cincinnati Reds (1876–1880), Boston Red Caps, Chicago White Stockings, Cincinnati Red Stockings (AA), New York Metropolitans, Kansas City Cowboys (AA)	
Charlie Jones (IF)	June 28, 1884	September 26, 1884	Utility infielder	Brooklyn Atlantics (AA)	
Charlie Jones (OF)	May 2, 1901	August 14, 1908	Outfielder	Boston Americans, Chicago White Sox, Washington Senators, St. Louis Browns	
Chipper Jones	September 11, 1993		Third baseman	Atlanta Braves	
Chris Jones (1980s OF)	June 8, 1985	June 13, 1986	Outfielder	Houston Astros, San Francisco Giants	
Chris Jones (1990s OF)	April 21, 1991	July 29, 2000	Outfielder	Cincinnati Reds, Houston Astros, Colorado Rockies, New York Mets, San Diego Padres, Arizona Diamondbacks, San Francisco Giants, Milwaukee Brewers	
Clarence Jones	April 20, 1967	September 25, 1968	Outfielder	Chicago Cubs	
Cleon Jones	September 14, 1963	May 1, 1976	Outfielder	New York Mets, Chicago White Sox	
Cobe Jones	September 27, 1928	June 15, 1929	Shortstop	Pittsburgh Pirates	
Cowboy Jones	June 24, 1898	June 21, 1901	Pitcher	Cleveland Spiders, St. Louis Perfectos/Cardinals	
Dale Jones	September 7, 1941	September 23, 1941	Pitcher	Philadelphia Phillies	
Dalton Jones	April 17, 1964	October 4, 1972	Utility infielder	Boston Red Sox, Detroit Tigers	
Darryl Jones	June 6, 1979	July 11, 1979	Outfielder	New York Yankees	
David Jones	May 17, 1882	July 1, 1882	Catcher	Baltimore Orioles (AA)	
Davy Jones	September 15, 1901	September 2, 1918	Outfielder	Milwaukee Brewers (1901)/St. Louis Browns, Chicago Cubs, Detroit Tigers, Chicago White Sox, Pittsburgh Rebels	
Dax Jones	July 11, 1996	September 28, 1996	Outfielder	San Francisco Giants	
Deacon Jones (P)	September 23, 1916	August 30, 1918	Pitcher	Detroit Tigers	
Deacon Jones (IF)	September 8, 1962	October 1, 1966	First baseman	Chicago White Sox	
Dick Jones	September 11, 1926	April 28, 1927	Pitcher	Washington Senators	
Doug Jones	April 9, 1982	September 29, 2000	Pitcher	Milwaukee Brewers, Cleveland Indians, Houston Astros, Philadelphia Phillies, Baltimore Orioles, Chicago Cubs, Oakland Athletics	
Earl Jones	July 6, 1945	September 10, 1945	Pitcher	St. Louis Browns	
Elijah Jones	April 13, 1907	April 24, 1909	Pitcher	Detroit Tigers	
Fielder Jones	April 18, 1896	September 1, 1915	Outfielder	Brooklyn Bridegrooms/Superbas, Chicago White Sox, St. Louis Terriers	
Frank Jones	July 2, 1884	July 7, 1884	Utility player	Detroit Wolverines	
Garrett Jones	May 15, 2007		Utility player	Minnesota Twins, Pittsburgh Pirates	
Gary Jones	September 25, 1970	July 6, 1971	Pitcher	New York Yankees	
Gordon Jones	August 6, 1954	September 11, 1965	Pitcher	St. Louis Cardinals, New York/San Francisco Giants, Baltimore Orioles, Kansas City Athletics, Houston Colt .45s/Astros	
Greg Jones	July 30, 2003	August 18, 2007	Pitcher	Anaheim Angels/Los Angeles Angels of Anaheim	
Hal Jones	April 25, 1961	September 30, 1962	First baseman	Cleveland Indians	
Henry Jones (2B)	August 20, 1884	October 14, 1884	Utility player	Detroit Wolverines	
Henry Jones (P)	April 22, 1890	May 31, 1890	Pitcher	Pittsburgh Alleghenys	
Howie Jones	September 5, 1921	September 17, 1921	Outfielder	St. Louis Cardinals	
Hunter Jones	April 20, 2009		Pitcher	Boston Red Sox, Florida Marlins	
Jumping Jack Jones	July 9, 1883	September 28, 1883	Pitcher	Detroit Tigers, Philadelphia Athletics (AA)	
Jacque Jones	June 9, 1999	June 10, 2008	Outfielder	Minnesota Twins, Chicago Cubs, Detroit Tigers, Florida Marlins	
Jake Jones	September 20, 1941	September 19, 1948	First baseman	Chicago White Sox, Boston Red Sox	
Jason Jones	July 23, 2003	September 28, 2003	Outfielder	Texas Rangers	
Jeff Jones (P)	April 10, 1980	September 14, 1984	Pitcher	Oakland Athletics	
Jeff Jones (OF)	April 4, 1983	April 24, 1983	Outfielder	Cincinnati Reds	
Jim Jones	June 29, 1897	August 5, 1902	Outfielder	Louisville Colonels, New York Giants	
Jimmy Jones	September 21, 1986	July 5, 1993	Pitcher	San Diego Padres, New York Yankees, Houston Astros, Montreal Expos	
John Jones	September 26, 1923	August 20, 1932	Outfielder	Philadelphia Athletics	
Johnny Jones	April 24, 1919	May 15, 1920	Pitcher	New York Giants, Boston Braves	
Ken Jones	May 19, 1924	September 17, 1930	Pitcher	Detroit Tigers, Boston Braves	
Levin Jones	May 14, 1873	October 14, 1874	Outfielder	Baltimore Marylands, Baltimore Canaries	
Lynn Jones	April 13, 1979	October 4, 1986	Outfielder	Detroit Tigers, Kansas City Royals	
Mack Jones	July 13, 1961	July 1, 1971	Outfielder	Milwaukee/Atlanta Braves, Cincinnati Reds, Montreal Expos	
Marcus Jones	July 17, 2000	July 17, 2000	Pitcher	Oakland Athletics	
Mike Jones (1890s P)	August 1, 1890	August 12, 1890	Pitcher	Louisville Colonels	
Mike Jones (1980s P)	September 6, 1980	October 6, 1985	Pitcher	Kansas City Royals	
Mitch Jones	June 16, 2009		Outfielder	Los Angeles Dodgers	
Nippy Jones	June 9, 1946	September 29, 1957	First baseman	St. Louis Cardinals, Philadelphia Phillies, Milwaukee Braves	
Odell Jones	September 11, 1975	September 23, 1988	Pitcher	Pittsburgh Pirates, Seattle Mariners, Texas Rangers, Baltimore Orioles, Milwaukee Brewers	
Oscar Jones	April 20, 1903	August 24, 1905	Pitcher	Brooklyn Superbas	
Percy Jones	August 6, 1920	June 11, 1930	Pitcher	Chicago Cubs, Boston Braves, Pittsburgh Pirates	
Randy Jones	June 16, 1973	September 7, 1982	Pitcher	San Diego Padres, New York Mets	
Red Jones	April 16, 1940	May 14, 1940	Outfielder	St. Louis Cardinals	
Ri Jones	August 13, 1883	August 27, 1884	Shortstop	Louisville Eclipse, Cincinnati Outlaw Reds	
Rick Jones	April 18, 1976	September 30, 1978	Pitcher	Boston Red Sox, Seattle Mariners	
Ricky Jones	September 3, 1986	October 5, 1986	Second baseman	Baltimore Orioles	
Ron Jones	August 26, 1988	October 6, 1991	Outfielder	Philadelphia Phillies	
Ross Jones	April 2, 1984	October 4, 1987	Shortstop	New York Mets, Seattle Mariners, Kansas City Royals	
Ruppert Jones	August 1, 1976	October 4, 1987	Outfielder	Kansas City Royals, Seattle Mariners, New York Yankees, San Diego Padres, Detroit Tigers, California Angels	
Sad Sam Jones	June 13, 1914	September 28, 1935	Pitcher	Cleveland Naps/Indians, Boston Red Sox, New York Yankees, St. Louis Browns, Washington Senators, Chicago White Sox	
Sam Jones	September 22, 1951	October 3, 1964	Pitcher	Cleveland Indians, Chicago Cubs, St. Louis Cardinals, San Francisco Giants, Detroit Tigers, Baltimore Orioles	
Sheldon Jones	September 9, 1946	June 28, 1953	Pitcher	New York Giants, Boston Braves, Chicago Cubs	
Sherman Jones	August 2, 1960	September 9, 1962	Pitcher	San Francisco Giants, Cincinnati Reds, New York Mets	
Stacy Jones	July 30, 1991	September 29, 1996	Pitcher	Baltimore Orioles, Chicago White Sox	
Steve Jones	August 15, 1967	September 21, 1969	Pitcher	Chicago White Sox, Washington Senators (1961–71), Kansas City Royals	
Terry Jones	September 8, 1996	October 7, 2001	Outfielder	Colorado Rockies, Montreal Expos	
Tex Jones	April 13, 1911	April 23, 1911	First baseman	Chicago White Sox	
Tim Jones (P)	September 4, 1977	October 2, 1977	Pitcher	Pittsburgh Pirates	
Tim Jones (IF)	July 26, 1988	October 2, 1993	Utility infielder	St. Louis Cardinals	
Todd Jones	July 7, 1993	August 15, 2008	Pitcher	Houston Astros, Detroit Tigers, Minnesota Twins, Colorado Rockies, Boston Red Sox, Cincinnati Reds, Philadelphia Phillies, Florida Marlins	
Tom Jones	August 25, 1902	October 9, 1910	First baseman	Baltimore Orioles (1901–02), St. Louis Browns, Detroit Tigers	
Tracy Jones	April 7, 1986	October 6, 1991	Outfielder	Cincinnati Reds, Montreal Expos, San Francisco Giants, Detroit Tigers, Seattle Mariners	
Willie Jones	September 10, 1947	May 7, 1961	Third baseman	Philadelphia Phillies, Cleveland Indians, Cincinnati Reds	
Bubber Jonnard	October 1, 1920	May 15, 1935	Catcher	Chicago White Sox, Pittsburgh Pirates, Philadelphia Phillies, St. Louis Cardinals	
Claude Jonnard	October 1, 1921	July 26, 1929	Pitcher	New York Giants, St. Louis Browns, Chicago Cubs	
Eddie Joost	September 11, 1936	September 25, 1955	Shortstop	Cincinnati Reds, Boston Braves, Philadelphia Athletics, Boston Red Sox	
Brian Jordan	April 8, 1992	September 30, 2006	Outfielder	St. Louis Cardinals, Atlanta Braves, Los Angeles Dodgers, Texas Rangers	
Buck Jordan	September 15, 1927	October 2, 1938	First baseman	New York Giants, Washington Senators, Boston Braves/Bees, Cincinnati Reds, Philadelphia Phillies	
Charlie Jordan	July 31, 1896	August 10, 1896	Pitcher	Philadelphia Phillies	
Dutch Jordan	April 25, 1903	October 8, 1904	Second baseman	Brooklyn Dodgers	
Harry Jordan	September 25, 1894	July 5, 1895	Pitcher	Pittsburgh Pirates	
Jimmy Jordan	April 20, 1933	September 27, 1936	Second baseman	Brooklyn Dodgers	
Kevin Jordan	August 8, 1995	October 7, 2001	Utility infielder	Philadelphia Phillies	
Mike Jordan	August 21, 1890	October 3, 1890	Outfielder	Pittsburgh Alleghenys	
Milt Jordan	April 16, 1953	May 10, 1953	Pitcher	Detroit Tigers	
Niles Jordan	August 26, 1951	September 16, 1952	Pitcher	Philadelphia Phillies, Cincinnati Reds	
Ricardo Jordan	June 23, 1995	April 13, 1998	Pitcher	Toronto Blue Jays, Philadelphia Phillies, New York Mets, Cincinnati Reds	
Ricky Jordan	July 17, 1988	September 20, 1996	First baseman	Philadelphia Phillies, Seattle Mariners	
Rip Jordan	June 25, 1912	September 27, 1919	Pitcher	Chicago White Sox, Washington Senators	
Scott Jordan	September 2, 1988	October 2, 1988	Outfielder	Cleveland Indians	
Slats Jordan	September 28, 1901	September 27, 1902	Utility player	Baltimore Orioles (1901–02)	
Tim Jordan	August 10, 1901	May 2, 1910	First baseman	Washington Senators, New York Highlanders, Brooklyn Superbas	
Tom Jordan	September 4, 1944	April 28, 1948	Catcher	Chicago White Sox, Cleveland Indians, St. Louis Browns	
Arndt Jorgens	April 26, 1929	August 2, 1939	Catcher	New York Yankees	
Orville Jorgens	April 19, 1935	September 29, 1937	Pitcher	Philadelphia Phillies	
Mike Jorgensen	September 10, 1985	October 6, 1985	First baseman	New York Mets, Montreal Expos, Oakland Athletics, Texas Rangers, Atlanta Braves, St. Louis Cardinals	
Pinky Jorgensen	September 14, 1937	September 30, 1937	Outfielder	Cincinnati Reds	
Ryan Jorgensen	August 8, 2005	September 19, 2008	Catcher	Florida Marlins, Cincinnati Reds, Montreal Expos	
Spider Jorgensen	April 15, 1947	June 30, 1951	Third baseman	Brooklyn Dodgers, New York Giants	
Terry Jorgensen	September 10, 1989	October 1, 1993	Third baseman	Minnesota Twins	
Félix José	September 2, 1988	September 28, 2003	Outfielder	Oakland Athletics, St. Louis Cardinals, Kansas City Royals, New York Yankees, Arizona Diamondbacks	
Kevin Joseph	August 1, 2002	August 25, 2002	Pitcher	St. Louis Cardinals	
Rick Joseph	June 18, 1964	September 23, 1970	Utility player	Kansas City Athletics, Philadelphia Phillies	
Duane Josephson	September 15, 1965	July 2, 1972	Catcher	Chicago White Sox, Boston Red Sox	
Von Joshua	September 2, 1969	August 9, 1980	Outfielder	Los Angeles Dodgers, San Francisco Giants, Milwaukee Brewers, San Diego Padres	
Addie Joss β	April 26, 1902	July 11, 1910	Pitcher	Cleveland Bronchos/Naps	
Ted Jourdan	September 18, 1916	October 3, 1920	First baseman	Chicago White Sox	
Jimmy Journell	June 29, 2003	May 2, 2005	Pitcher	St. Louis Cardinals	
Pop Joy	June 3, 1884	September 24, 1884	First baseman	Washington Nationals (UA)	
Bill Joyce	April 19, 1890	October 12, 1898	Third baseman	Brooklyn Ward's Wonders, Boston Reds (1890–91), Brooklyn Grooms, Washington Senators (NL), New York Giants	
Bob Joyce	May 4, 1939	July 14, 1946	Pitcher	Philadelphia Athletics, New York Giants	
Dick Joyce	September 3, 1965	October 2, 1965	Pitcher	Kansas City Athletics	
George Joyce	August 14, 1886	August 14, 1886	Outfielder	Washington Nationals (1886–1889)	
Matt Joyce	May 5, 2008		Outfielder	Detroit Tigers, Tampa Bay Rays	
Mike Joyce	July 2, 1962	September 29, 1963	Pitcher	Chicago White Sox	
Wally Joyner	April 8, 1986	June 14, 2001	First baseman	California Angels, Kansas City Royals, San Diego Padres, Atlanta Braves, Anaheim Angels	
Mike Judd	September 28, 1997	June 12, 2001	Pitcher	Los Angeles Dodgers, Tampa Bay Devil Rays, Texas Rangers	
Oscar Judd	April 16, 1941	May 11, 1948	Pitcher	Boston Red Sox, Philadelphia Phillies	
Ralph Judd	October 2, 1927	May 7, 1930	Pitcher	Washington Senators, New York Giants	
Frank Jude	July 9, 1906	October 7, 1906	Outfielder	Cincinnati Reds	
Jeff Juden	September 15, 1991	October 3, 1999	Pitcher	Houston Astros, Philadelphia Phillies, San Francisco Giants, Montreal Expos, Cleveland Indians, Milwaukee Brewers, Anaheim Angels, New York Yankees	
Aaron Judge	August 13, 2016		Right Fielder	New York Yankees	
Joe Judge	September 20, 1915	May 12, 1934	First baseman	Washington Senators, Brooklyn Dodgers, Boston Red Sox	
Wally Judnich	April 16, 1940	May 12, 1949	Outfielder	St. Louis Browns, Cleveland Indians, Pittsburgh Pirates	
Howie Judson	April 22, 1948	September 25, 1954	Pitcher	Chicago White Sox, Cincinnati Reds	
Josh Judy	May 22, 2011		Pitcher	Cleveland Indians	
Lyle Judy	September 17, 1935	September 29, 1935	Second baseman	St. Louis Cardinals	
Red Juelich	May 30, 1939	September 27, 1939	Second baseman	Pittsburgh Pirates	
Jorge Julio	April 26, 2001	June 1, 2009	Pitcher	Baltimore Orioles, New York Mets, Arizona Diamondbacks, Florida Marlins, Colorado Rockies, Cleveland Indians, Atlanta Braves, Milwaukee Brewers	
George Jumonville	September 13, 1940	May 20, 1941	Shortstop	Philadelphia Phillies	
Eric Junge	September 11, 2002	May 11, 2003	Pitcher	Philadelphia Phillies	
Ken Jungels	September 15, 1937	June 7, 1942	Pitcher	Cleveland Indians, Pittsburgh Pirates	
Ed Jurak	June 30, 1982	June 26, 1989	Utility infielder	Boston Red Sox, Oakland Athletics, San Francisco Giants	
Mike Jurewicz	September 7, 1965	September 28, 1965	Pitcher	New York Yankees	
Billy Jurges	May 4, 1931	September 9, 1947	Shortstop	Chicago Cubs, New York Giants	
Al Jurisich	April 26, 1944	September 21, 1947	Pitcher	St. Louis Cardinals, Philadelphia Phillies	
Jair Jurrjens	August 15, 2007		Pitcher	Detroit Tigers, Atlanta Braves	
Joe Just	May 13, 1944	May 13, 1945	Catcher	Cincinnati Reds	
David Justice	May 24, 1989	September 29, 2002	Outfielder	Atlanta Braves, Cleveland Indians, New York Yankees, Oakland Athletics	
Walt Justis	July 12, 1905	August 1, 1905	Pitcher	Detroit Tigers	
Skip Jutze	September 1, 1972	September 21, 1977	Catcher	St. Louis Cardinals, Houston Astros, Seattle Mariners	
Herb Juul	July 11, 1911	July 15, 1911	Pitcher	Cincinnati Reds	
Herold Juul	April 24, 1914	July 30, 1914	Pitcher	Brooklyn Tip-Tops	
