= Harry Luff =

American baseball player (1856–1916)

- Utility player
- Born: September 14, 1856; Philadelphia, Pennsylvania, U.S.
- Died: October 11, 1916 (aged 60); Philadelphia, Pennsylvania, U.S.
- Batted: Unknown Threw: Unknown

Major-league debut
- April 19, 1875, for the New Haven Elm Citys

Last major-league appearance
- July 5, 1884, for the Kansas City Cowboys

Major-league statistics
- Batting average: .247
- Home runs: 2
- Earned run average: 3.28
- Stats at Baseball Reference

Teams
- New Haven Elm Citys (1875); Detroit Wolverines (1882); Cincinnati Red Stockings (1882); Louisville Eclipse (1883); Philadelphia Keystones (1884); Kansas City Cowboys (1884)

Henry Thomas Luff (September 14, 1856 – October 11, 1916) was an American professional baseball player who played for six teams in four different major leagues from 1875 to 1885. He played for the New Haven Elm Citys in the National Association; the Cincinnati Red Stockings and the Louisville Eclipse in the American Association; the Detroit Wolverines in the National League; and the Philadelphia Keystones and the Kansas City Cowboys in the Union Association. He also played on several minor-league teams in various leagues. He played at every position except catcher.

His career was marred by arrests for stolen goods, the suspicious death of a girlfriend, a drunken hotel fight in which he assaulted a police officer and another drunken incident where he threatened a streetcar conductor with a knife.

== Early life and education ==
Luff was born in Philadelphia on September 14, 1856, to Walter Hamilton and Elizabeth Armstrong Luff. He graduated from the Polytechnic College of Pennsylvania and played amateur baseball in his leisure time.

== Career ==
Over the course of his career, he played in four different major leagues - the National Association in 1875, the National League in 1882, the American Association from 1881 to 1883 and the Union Association in 1884. He also played in various minor leagues during his 11-season career that ended in 1885.

Luff's major-league career began in 1875 with the New Haven Elm Citys of the National Association. He was in the starting lineup, batted third and played right field for the franchise's inaugural game on April 19 against the defending champion Boston Red Stockings. He started as pitcher for seven games with New Haven and completed five games but had a 1–6 record.

The New Haven club was struggling financially, and in August and September, played a series of exhibitions in New York City and Canada to earn additional income. During this trip, the team stayed in London, Ontario's Tecumseh House hotel. When the team checked out, the hotel's owners noticed that Luff and his roommate Billy Geer had more luggage than when they checked into the hotel. An investigation revealed that several valuable items of clothing, including a fur coat, were missing, and when the hotel contacted the New Haven team, they turned the matter over to the police. The stolen items were discovered in Luff and Geer's shared room in a New Haven boarding house, and both players were arrested by the police and released from their contracts by the Elm Citys. Luff claimed that the items had been taken by Geer, and that he had no knowledge of the thefts. After the arrests, stolen items from a hotel in Scranton, Pennsylvania at which the team had previously stayed were also discovered in Geer's room. The charges were dropped due to lack of evidence since witnesses were not willing to travel from Ontario to New Haven to testify.

He signed with the Memphis Reds for the 1876 season and joined the Rochester Flour Cities of the International Association in 1877. He played for the Pittsburgh Allegheny and the Forest City Club of Cleveland in 1878. Luff skipped the next two baseball seasons and worked with his father's real estate business and as a government office clerk. He also played for the Philadelphia Athletics.

Luff was appointed a census enumerator and considered running for political office in the Pennsylvania state legislature, however, his political aspirations ended in 1881 when he was the target of a police investigation into the suspicious death of a girlfriend, Lydia Apker. A coroner's report stated that Apker "came to her death from congestion of the brain, the result of criminal malpractice at the hands of Harry Luff." A warrant was placed for his arrest and he fled Philadelphia. He was eventually arrested but the charges were dropped.

Luff signed with the Providence Grays but was cut before the season began. He joined the Detroit Wolverines for a three-game audition but was cut in late May 1882. He played for the Cincinnati Red Stockings of the American Association but was cut from the club when they discovered he was in secret negotiations with the Buffalo Bisons. He left baseball for a brief time again to join the civil engineering firm of a college classmate.

He left his civil engineering job after one year and joined the minor league Brooklyn Grays of the Interstate Association. He joined the Louisville Eclipse of the American Association but played poorly and was suspended due to "drunkenness and disorderly conduct" due to a hotel fight with a policeman that resulted in a fine but no jail time. He capitalized on his friendship with Fergy Malone and joined the Philadelphia Keystones of the Union Association. He was dismissed from the Keystones due to a drunken incident in Cincinnati in which he threatened a streetcar conductor with a knife. His final stop in the major leagues was with the Kansas City Cowboys but he lasted only 6 games in which he played poorly and his major-league baseball career ended. He played for a brief time with the minor league Augusta Browns of the Southern League but was released after additional drunkenness.

Luff was unusual among players of his time, in that he had a college degree and prospects of a career outside baseball, and played baseball simply because he enjoyed the game. In 1891, he was sentenced to a one-year sentence in the Philadelphia House of Correction for an undetermined criminal charge.

Luff died from heart disease on October 11, 1916, and was interred at Laurel Hill Cemetery in Philadelphia, Pennsylvania.

== Personal life ==
Luff married Minnie Cunningham in 1885 and together they had seven children. Minnie died of pneumonia in 1895 and Luff was remarried to Elvira George in 1904.
