= George Patterson (baseball) =

American baseball player

- Outfielder
- Batted: Unknown Threw: Unknown

MLB debut
- April 24, 1884, for the Philadelphia Keystones

Last MLB appearance
- April 26, 1884, for the Philadelphia Keystones

MLB statistics
- Batting average: .143
- Home runs: 0
- Runs batted in: 0
- Stats at Baseball Reference

Teams
- Philadelphia Keystones (1884)

George Patterson was a 19th-century Major League Baseball player. He played outfield in two games for the Philadelphia Keystones of the Union Association in 1884. He had one hit in seven at-bats in those two games.

== Sources ==
- Career statistics from Baseball Reference
