= Buster Hoover =

American baseball player (1863–1924)

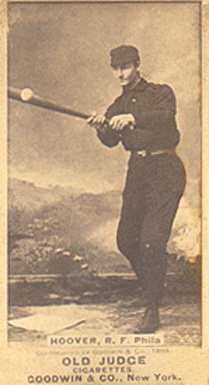
- Outfielder
- Born: April 12, 1863; Philadelphia, Pennsylvania, US
- Died: April 16, 1924 (aged 61); Jersey City, New Jersey, US
- Batted: Right Threw: Right

MLB debut
- April 17, 1884, for the Philadelphia Keystones

Last MLB appearance
- October 15, 1892, for the Cincinnati Reds

MLB statistics
- Games played: 127
- Batting average: .288
- Hits: 151
- Stats at Baseball Reference

Teams
- Philadelphia Keystones (1884); Philadelphia Quakers (1884); Baltimore Orioles (1886); Cincinnati Reds (1892)

William James "Buster" Hoover (April 12, 1863 – April 16, 1924) was an American outfielder in Major League Baseball. He played for the Philadelphia Keystones, Philadelphia Quakers, Baltimore Orioles, and Cincinnati Reds between 1884 and 1892. Described as a "long legged heavy hitter", Hoover was among his league's leaders in several offensive statistics during his 12-year professional baseball career. In 127 career major league games, Hoover had a batting average of .288. He stood 6 feet 1 inch (1.85 m) and weighed 178 pounds (81 kg).

== Career ==
Hoover was born in Philadelphia, Pennsylvania in 1863. He started his baseball career in 1883, playing for the Reading Actives and Wilmington Quicksteps of the Interstate Association.

The following season, Hoover joined the Union Association's Philadelphia Keystones and made his major league debut on April 17, 1884. The Keystones played 67 games, and Hoover appeared in 63 of them, mostly in left field. Hoover was one of the best players in the Union Association that year. He hit .364 to finish second in the league batting race and also ranked third in both on-base percentage and slugging percentage. However, he was the only player on the Keystones "who was any offensive threat". The team folded in August, before the end of the season. Hoover then signed with the National League's Philadelphia Quakers. In 10 games with them, he batted .190.

Hoover played for the Eastern League's Washington Nationals in 1885. In 1886, he played 42 games for the Wilkes-Barre club in the Pennsylvania State Association and 40 games for the American Association's Baltimore Orioles. With Wilkes-Barre, he played well, batting .331 with seven home runs and 52 runs scored. He also led the league with a .589 slugging percentage. With the Orioles, he hit just .217.

Hoover spent the entire 1887 season in Wilkes-Barre. Again, he dominated the Pennsylvania State Association, hitting .448 and leading the entire league in both hits (90) and total bases (134).

In 1888, he began the season with the Philadelphia Quakers of the National League but did not appear in any games. After he was released, one newspaper account noted: "'Buster' Hoover, the long legged heavy hitter that Harry Wright expected so much of early in the season, is now with the Albany club." Hoover bounced around the minor leagues over the next few seasons. He played for the International Association's Albany Governors in 1888, the International League's Toronto Canucks in 1889, and the Western Association's Kansas City Blues in 1890 and 1891.

In late 1892, Hoover received his final shot in the majors with the Cincinnati Reds. He lasted 14 games and batted .176. In 1893, Hoover batted .322 in the Southern Association. He ended his professional baseball career in 1894 in the Eastern League.

Hoover died in Jersey City, New Jersey, at the age of 61.
