= Chris Rickley =

American baseball player (1859–1911)

- Shortstop
- Born: October 7, 1859; Philadelphia, Pennsylvania, U.S.
- Died: October 25, 1911 (aged 52); Philadelphia, Pennsylvania, U.S.
- Batted: Unknown Threw: Unknown

MLB debut
- June 9, 1884, for the Philadelphia Keystones

Last MLB appearance
- June 21, 1884, for the Philadelphia Keystones

MLB statistics
- Batting average: .200
- Home runs: 0
- Runs batted in: 0
- Stats at Baseball Reference

Teams
- Philadelphia Keystones (1884)

Christian Rickley (October 7, 1859 – October 25, 1911) was a 19th-century American Major League Baseball player. He played primarily shortstop during the 1884 season for the Philadelphia Keystones of the Union Association. He appeared in six games for the Keystones in June 1884 and had five hits in 25 at-bats. He played in the minor leagues through 1890.

== Sources ==
- Career statistics from Baseball Reference · Baseball Reference (Minors) · Retrosheet · Baseball Almanac
