= Jack Clements =

American baseball player (1864–1941)

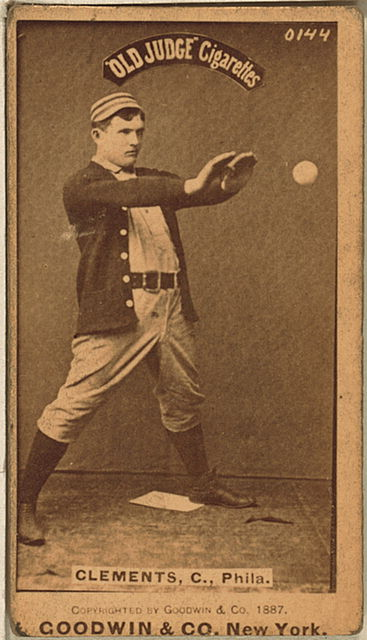
- Catcher
- Born: July 24, 1864; Philadelphia, Pennsylvania, U.S.
- Died: May 23, 1941 (aged 76); Norristown, Pennsylvania, U.S.
- Batted: Left Threw: Left

MLB debut
- April 22, 1884, for the Philadelphia Keystones

Last MLB appearance
- October 2, 1900, for the Boston Beaneaters

MLB statistics
- Batting average: .287
- Home runs: 77
- Runs batted in: 687
- Stats at Baseball Reference

Teams
- As player: Philadelphia Keystones (1884); Philadelphia Quakers / Phillies (1884–1897); St. Louis Browns (1898); Cleveland Spiders (1899); Boston Beaneaters (1900); As manager: Philadelphia Phillies (1890)

John J. Clements (July 24, 1864 – May 23, 1941) was an American professional baseball player. He played as a catcher in Major League Baseball for 17 seasons. Despite being left-handed, Clements caught 1,076 games, almost four times as many as any other left-handed player in major league history and was the last left-hander to catch on a regular basis. He is credited with being the first catcher to wear a chest protector.

== Baseball career ==
Born in Philadelphia, Clements began his major league career in 1884 in the Union Association. He played as a catcher/outfielder for the Philadelphia Keystones until the team folded in August. Clements then went to the National League, signing with the Philadelphia Quakers to finish the year.

Clements spent the next 13 seasons with the Quakers (who became the Phillies in 1890), and became the team's regular catcher in 1888. He also served as a player-manager during part of the 1890 season when manager Harry Wright suffered temporary blindness. During the 1890s, he established himself as one of the National League's top hitters, finishing among the top 4 in batting average on 3 occasions. Clements also hit for power, finishing second in the NL with 17 home runs in 1893 and finishing third in the NL with 13 in 1895. Also in 1895, he finished with a .394 batting average, the highest single-season average by a catcher in major league history.

After the 1897 season, Clements was traded to the St. Louis Browns. He played one season for the Browns, during which he became the first player (of either handedness) to catch 1,000 games in his career.

Before the 1899 season, Clements was assigned to the Cleveland Spiders. The move took place after Spiders owners Frank and Stanley Robison purchased the Browns and re-distributed players among the two franchises. Clements appeared in only 4 games for the Spiders before being released.

He played his final Major League season in 1900, playing in 16 games for the Boston Beaneaters.

At the time of his retirement, he held the single-season and career records for home runs by a catcher. Both of his records were broken by Gabby Hartnett in the 1920s; the single-season record fell in 1925, while the career record fell in 1928. Clements is also the only 19th-century baseball player of prominence to retire with more home runs than triples.

In 1160 games over 17 seasons, Clements posted a .287 batting average (1231-for-4295) with 619 runs, 226 doubles, 60 triples, 77 home runs, 687 RBI, 341 bases on balls, .348 on-base percentage and .421 slugging percentage.

He died of an illness in Norristown, Pennsylvania, in 1941, at age 76. He is buried at Arlington Cemetery in Drexel Hill, Pennsylvania.

In his Historical Baseball Abstract, Bill James ranked Clements as the 58th greatest catcher in baseball history.

== See also ==
- List of Major League Baseball player–managers
