= Billy Geer =

American baseball player

- Shortstop
- Born: c. 1852; New York, U.S.
- Died: September 30, 1928; Chicago, Illinois, U.S.
- Batted: Unknown Threw: Right

Major-league debut
- October 15, 1874, for the New York Mutuals

Last major-league appearance
- May 10, 1885, for the Louisville Colonels

Major-league statistics
- Batting average: .214
- Home runs: 0
- Runs batted in: 33
- Stats at Baseball Reference

Teams
- New York Mutuals (1874); New Haven Elm Citys (1875); Cincinnati Reds (1878); Worcester Ruby Legs (1880); Philadelphia Keystones (1884); Brooklyn Atlantics (1884); Louisville Colonels (1885)

William H. Geer(c. 1852 – September 30, 1928), was an American professional baseball player who played most of his major-league career as a shortstop for five seasons and a total of seven teams.

== Baseball career ==
Geer began his baseball career with the Unions of Morrisania, who he played for from 1868 to 1869. After attending Manhattan College, Geer played for the Flyaways of New York City in 1874. In October of that same year, he made his professional baseball debut for the New York Mutuals of the National Association.

The following season, while playing for the New Haven Elm Citys, he was arrested along with his roommate, Henry Luff, for burglary of several hotel rooms, although he was acquitted for lack of evidence.

Geer spent the next two seasons playing for the independent Syracuse Stars before returning to the major leagues with the Cincinnati Reds in 1878. He retired from baseball in 1879, but quickly returned to it, playing two games for Worcester in 1880. In 1883, Geer captained the pennant-winning Brooklyn Grays of the Interstate Association. He played for the Philadelphia Keystones, the Brooklyn Atlantics, the Louisville Colonels, and Hartford of the Southern New England League over the next two seasons, never staying long in one place.

== Later life and criminal career ==
After leaving baseball in the mid-1880s, Geer turned to check forgery. He was arrested numerous times across the United States over the following two decades, frequently operating under aliases, and was convicted and imprisoned on several occasions. These included a sentence at Stillwater State Prison in Minnesota in 1892, followed by further prison terms in Virginia, Iowa, Illinois, and Missouri. While serving a sentence in Missouri, he was granted a pardon in 1928 because of a terminal illness, and died later that year.
