= Elmer Cleveland =

American baseball player (1862–1913)

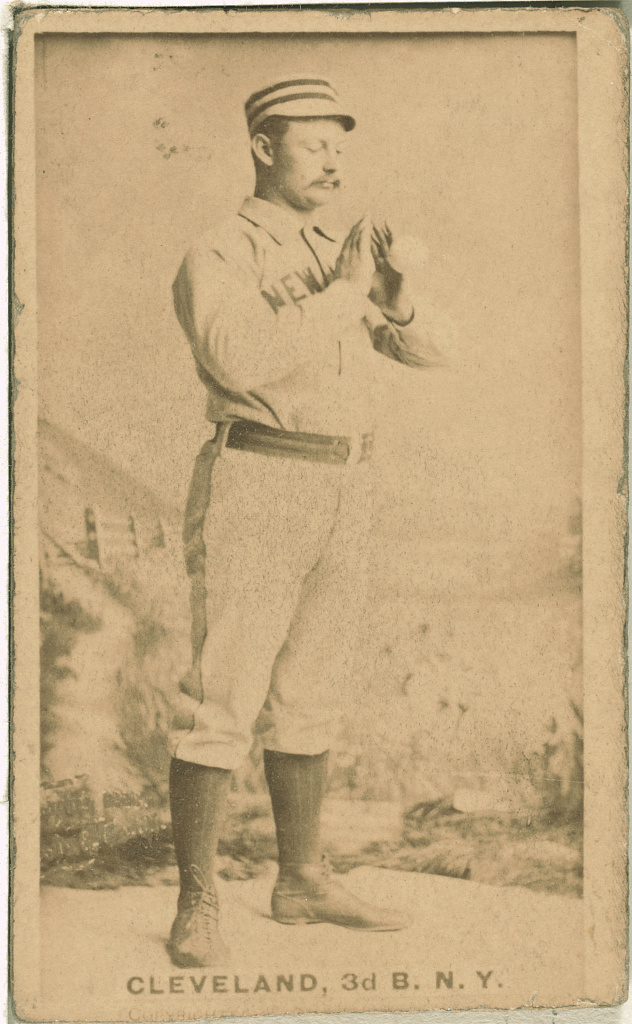
- 1887 baseball card of Cleveland
- Third baseman
- Born: September 15, 1862; Washington, D.C., U.S.
- Died: October 8, 1913 (aged 51); Zimmerman, Pennsylvania, U.S.
- Batted: Right Threw: Right

MLB debut
- August 29, 1884, for the Cincinnati Outlaw Reds

Last MLB appearance
- April 23, 1891, for the Columbus Solons

MLB statistics
- Games played: 80
- Batting average: .255
- Runs batted in: 20
- Stats at Baseball Reference

Teams
- Cincinnati Outlaw Reds (1884); New York Giants (1888); Pittsburgh Alleghenys (1888); Columbus Solons (1891)

Elmer Ellsworth Cleveland (September 15, 1862 – October 8, 1913) was an American professional baseball third baseman who played in Major League Baseball. He began his professional career in the Western Interstate League in 1883 and then joined the Cincinnati Outlaw Reds of the Union Association in 1884. He played in 29 games with the Reds and hit .322.

From 1885 to 1887, he was back in the minors in the Southern League and Northwestern League. He returned to the majors in 1888 with the New York Giants and Pittsburgh Alleghenys of the National League.

After two seasons with Omaha of the Western Association, he played in the American Association with the Columbus Solons. He ended his career in the Pennsylvania State League in 1892.
