= Robert Foster (baseball) =

American baseball player (1856–1921)

- Catcher
- Born: October 6, 1856; Philadelphia, Pennsylvania, U.S.
- Died: June 15, 1921 (aged 64); Philadelphia, Pennsylvania, U.S.
- Batted: Unknown Threw: Unknown

MLB debut
- June 18, 1884, for the Philadelphia Keystones

Last MLB appearance
- June 26, 1884, for the Philadelphia Athletics

MLB statistics
- Batting average: .214
- Home runs: 0
- Runs batted in: 0
- Stats at Baseball Reference

Teams
- Philadelphia Keystones (1884); Philadelphia Athletics (1884)

Robert G. Foster (October 6, 1856 – June 15, 1921) was an American Major League Baseball player.

== Early life ==
He was born October 6, 1856, in Philadelphia.

== Career ==
He played primarily catcher during the 1884 season for the Philadelphia Keystones of the Union Association and the Philadelphia Athletics of the American Association.

He died on June 15, 1921, in Philadelphia and was interred at West Laurel Hill Cemetery in Bala Cynwyd, Pennsylvania.
