= Dave Drew =

American baseball player

- Shortstop
- Batted: Unknown Threw: Unknown

MLB debut
- May 14, 1884, for the Philadelphia Keystones

Last MLB appearance
- June 9, 1884, for the Washington Nationals

MLB statistics
- Batting average: .323
- Hits: 20
- RBIs: 9
- Stats at Baseball Reference

Teams
- Philadelphia Keystones (1884); Washington Nationals (1884)

David Drew was a Major League Baseball shortstop who played in two games for the Philadelphia Keystones and 13 games for the Washington Nationals of the Union Association in 1884.
