= John McGuinness (baseball) =

Irish baseball player (1857–1916)

- First baseman
- Born: 1857; Ireland
- Died: December 19, 1916 (aged 58–59); Binghamton, New York, U.S.
- Batted: Unknown Threw: Unknown

MLB debut
- May 6, 1876, for the New York Mutuals

Last MLB appearance
- August 7, 1884, for the Philadelphia Keystones

MLB statistics
- Batting average: .244
- Home runs: 0
- Runs scored: 32
- Stats at Baseball Reference

Teams
- New York Mutuals (1876); Syracuse Stars (1879); Philadelphia Keystones (1884)

John James McGuinness (1857 – December 19, 1916) was an Irish professional baseball player. He played in three seasons in Major League Baseball, 1876 for the New York Mutuals, 1879 for the Syracuse Stars, and 1884 for the Philadelphia Keystones of the Union Association. He was mostly used as a first baseman.

== Sources ==
- Career statistics from Baseball Reference · Baseball Reference (Minors) · Retrosheet · Baseball Almanac
