= Bill Kienzle =

American baseball player (1862–1910)

- Outfielder
- Born: March 12, 1862; Philadelphia, Pennsylvania, U.S.
- Died: April 16, 1910 (aged 48); Philadelphia, Pennsylvania, U.S.
- Batted: Left Threw: Left

MLB debut
- September 15, 1882, for the Philadelphia Athletics

Last MLB appearance
- August 7, 1884, for the Philadelphia Keystones

MLB statistics
- Batting average: .262
- Home runs: 0
- Runs batted in: 9
- Stats at Baseball Reference

Teams
- Philadelphia Athletics (1882); Philadelphia Keystones (1884)

William H. Kienzle (March 12, 1862 – April 16, 1910) was a 19th-century American Major League Baseball player. He played outfield for the 1882 Philadelphia Athletics in the American Association and the 1884 Philadelphia Keystones in the Union Association.
