= Joe Crotty =

American baseball player (1860–1926)

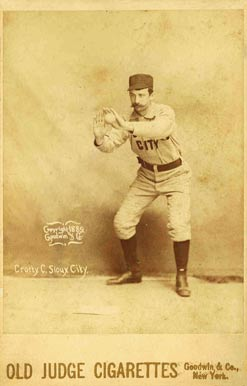
- Catcher
- Born: December 24, 1860; Cincinnati, Ohio, U.S.
- Died: June 22, 1926 (aged 65); Minneapolis, Minnesota, U.S.
- Batted: Right Threw: Right

MLB debut
- May 4, 1882, for the Louisville Eclipse

Last MLB appearance
- July 5, 1886, for the New York Metropolitans

MLB statistics
- Batting average: .182
- Home runs: 1
- Runs batted in: 9
- Stats at Baseball Reference

Teams
- Louisville Eclipse (1882); St. Louis Brown Stockings (1882); Cincinnati Outlaw Reds (1884); Louisville Colonels (1885); New York Metropolitans (1885)

Joseph P. Crotty (December 24, 1860 in Cincinnati, Ohio – June 22, 1926 in Minneapolis, Minnesota) was a 19th-century American professional baseball catcher. Crotty played from 1882–1886 in the American Association for the Louisville Eclipse, St. Louis Brown Stockings, and New York Metropolitans and for the Cincinnati Outlaw Reds in the Union Association.

On August 26, 1884, while playing for the Outlaw Reds, Crotty was the catcher who caught Dick Burns' no-hitter.
