= Fred Siegel (baseball) =

American baseball player (1861–1916)

John Siegel
- Third Baseman
- Born: 1861; Philadelphia, Pennsylvania, U.S.
- Died: June 6, 1916; Philadelphia, Pennsylvania, U.S.
- Batted: Unknown Threw: Unknown

MLB debut
- June 9, 1884, for the Philadelphia Keystones

Last MLB appearance
- June 24, 1884, for the Philadelphia Keystones

MLB statistics
- Batting average: .226
- Home runs: 0
- Runs batted in: 0
- Stats at Baseball Reference

Teams
- Philadelphia Keystones (1884)

Frederick Siegel (1861 – June 6, 1916) was a 19th-century American Major League Baseball player. He played shortstop during the 1884 season for the Philadelphia Keystones of the Union Association. He appeared in eight games for the Keystones in June 1884 and had seven hits in 31 at-bats.
