= Tom Gillen =

American baseball player (1862–1889)

- Catcher
- Born: May 18, 1862; Philadelphia, Pennsylvania, U.S.
- Died: January 26, 1889 (aged 26); Philadelphia, Pennsylvania, U.S.
- Batted: Unknown Threw: Unknown

MLB debut
- April 18, 1884, for the Philadelphia Keystones

Last MLB appearance
- September 15, 1886, for the Detroit Wolverines

MLB statistics
- Batting average: .175
- Home runs: 0
- Runs batted in: 4
- Stats at Baseball Reference

Teams
- Philadelphia Keystones (1884); Detroit Wolverines (1886)

Thomas J. Gillen (May 18, 1862 – January 26, 1889) was a 19th-century American Major League Baseball player. He played primarily catcher during the 1884 season for the Philadelphia Keystones of the Union Association and during the 1886 season for the Detroit Wolverines of the National League.

== Sources ==
- Career statistics from Baseball Reference · Baseball Reference (Minors) · Retrosheet · Baseball Almanac
