= John O'Donnell (baseball) =

American baseball player

- Catcher
- Born: Littlestown, Pennsylvania, U.S.
- Batted: Unknown Threw: Unknown

MLB debut
- July 16, 1884, for the Philadelphia Keystones

Last MLB appearance
- July 16, 1884, for the Philadelphia Keystones

MLB statistics
- Batting average: .250
- Home runs: 0
- Runs batted in: 0
- Stats at Baseball Reference

Teams
- Philadelphia Keystones (1884)

John O'Donnell was a 19th-century American Major League Baseball player. He played catcher in one game for the 1884 Philadelphia Keystones of the Union Association. His one game was played on July 16, 1884. He recorded one hit in four at-bats.

== Sources ==
- Career statistics from Baseball Reference
