= Lou Meyers =

American baseball player (1859–1920)

- Catcher/Outfielder
- Born: December 9, 1859; Cincinnati, Ohio
- Died: November 30, 1920 (aged 60); Cincinnati, Ohio
- Batted: Right Threw: Right

MLB debut
- April 17, 1884, for the Cincinnati Outlaw Reds

Last MLB appearance
- May 10, 1884, for the Cincinnati Outlaw Reds

MLB statistics
- Batting average: .000
- Hits: 0
- RBIs: 0
- Stats at Baseball Reference

Teams
- Cincinnati Outlaw Reds (1884)

Lewis Henry Meyers (a.k.a. "Crazy Horse") (December 9, 1859 – November 30, 1920) was a 19th-century baseball catcher and outfielder for the Cincinnati Outlaw Reds of the Union Association in 1884, playing in 2 career games on April 17 and May 10. He had three at-bats and did not record a hit. After his brief Major League career, Meyers spent two seasons in the Western League in 1886–1887 and finished his professional career with the Charleston Seagulls of the Southern Association in 1888.
