= Zimmerman, Pennsylvania =

Unincorporated community in Pennsylvania, US

Zimmerman
- Unincorporated community
- Location within the state of Pennsylvania Zimmerman (the United States)
- Coordinates: 40°2′54″N 79°6′32″W
- Country: United States
- State: Pennsylvania
- County: Somerset
- Elevation: 1,988 ft (606 m)
- Time zone: UTC-5 (Eastern (EST))
  - Summer (DST): UTC-4 (EDT)
- GNIS feature ID: 1191952

Zimmerman is an unincorporated community and coal town in Somerset County, Pennsylvania, United States.
