= Fred Robinson (baseball) =

American baseball player (1856–1933)

- Second baseman
- Born: July 6, 1856; South Acton, Massachusetts, U.S.
- Died: December 18, 1933 (aged 77); Hudson, Massachusetts, U.S.
- Batted: Right Threw: Right

MLB debut
- April 17, 1884, for the Cincinnati Outlaw Reds

Last MLB appearance
- April 19, 1884, for the Cincinnati Outlaw Reds

MLB statistics
- Batting average: .231
- hits: 3
- Runs scored: 1
- Stats at Baseball Reference

Teams
- Cincinnati Outlaw Reds (1884)

Frederic Henry Robinson was an American Major League Baseball player. He played three games at second base for the Cincinnati Outlaw Reds of the Union Association in 1884.

He was the older brother of Hall of Fame manager Wilbert Robinson.

== Sources ==
- Career statistics from Baseball Reference · Retrosheet · Baseball Almanac
