= Lefty Johnson (outfielder) =

American baseball player (1861–1942)

- Outfielder
- Born: September 28, 1861; New Jersey, U.S.
- Died: July 17, 1942 (aged 80); Chester, Pennsylvania, U.S.
- Batted: Left Threw: Left

MLB debut
- June 27, 1884, for the Philadelphia Keystones

Last MLB appearance
- April 27, 1892, for the Baltimore Orioles

MLB statistics
- Batting average: .264
- Home runs: 2
- Runs scored: 121
- Stats at Baseball Reference

Teams
- Philadelphia Keystones (1884); Indianapolis Hoosiers (1887); Baltimore Orioles (1890–92)

William F. Johnson (September 28, 1861 – July 17, 1942) was an American Major League Baseball outfielder. He played all or parts of five seasons in the majors.

Nicknamed "Lefty" and "Sleepy Bill", Johnson made his debut with the Philadelphia Keystones of the Union Association in 1884, playing just one game in left field and going 0-for-4. He did not play in the majors again until 1887, when he played in 11 games for the Indianapolis Hoosiers. He played all 11 games in right field, batting just .190. He was one of 19 different players to appear in right field that season for the Hoosiers.

Once again, Johnson spent two seasons out of the majors, returning in 1890 for the American Association's Baltimore Orioles. After batting .295 in 24 games that season, he would be one of the Orioles' primary outfielders in 1891, playing at least 24 games at all three positions while batting .271 with 79 RBI. However, after the Orioles moved to the National League in 1892, Johnson got off to a slow start. He went just 2-for-15 in his first four games and was let go, ending his major league career.
