= Philadelphia Keystones =

Professional baseball franchise (1884)

Poster promoting an April 1884 match between the Keystones and the Boston Unions.

The Philadelphia Keystones (also known as the Keystone Club of Philadelphia) were a professional baseball franchise. In 1884, they were a member of the short-lived Union Association. The team was owned by former player Tom Pratt.

The Keystones were managed by catcher Fergy Malone and finished in eighth place in the 12-team league with a 21–46 record. Their top-hitting regular was left fielder / infielder Buster Hoover, who batted .364 with a slugging percentage of .495. Their best pitcher was Jersey Bakley, who was 14–25 with an earned run average of 4.47. Their home games were played at Keystone Park. Jack Clements, who played for 17 seasons and was the last (and virtually the only) left-handed catcher in major league history, made his big-league debut with the Keystones.

Like several other teams in the Union Association, the Keystones did not make it through the entire season, folding after the game of August 7. The entire league ceased operations after 1884, its first and only season.

== 1860s ==
There was an amateur or semi-pro Keystone club in Philadelphia during the 1860s. They generally played their games at the same ballpark as the better-known Athletic ball club. The 1884 team revived the old club name, and both names reference Pennsylvania, "The Keystone State".

== 1884 season ==
=== Season standings ===
Union Association
Team	W	L	Pct.	GB	Home	Road
St. Louis Maroons	94	19	.832	—	49‍–‍6	45‍–‍13
Cincinnati Outlaw Reds	69	36	.657	21	35‍–‍17	34‍–‍19
Baltimore Monumentals	58	47	.552	32	29‍–‍21	29‍–‍26
Boston Reds	58	51	.532	34	34‍–‍22	24‍–‍29
Milwaukee Brewers	8	4	.667	35½	8‍–‍4	0‍–‍0
St. Paul Saints	2	6	.250	39½	0‍–‍0	2‍–‍6
Chicago Browns/Pittsburgh Stogies	41	50	.451	42	21‍–‍19	20‍–‍31
Altoona Mountain Citys	6	19	.240	44	6‍–‍12	0‍–‍7
Wilmington Quicksteps	2	16	.111	44½	1‍–‍6	1‍–‍10
Washington Nationals (UA)	47	65	.420	46½	36‍–‍27	11‍–‍38
Philadelphia Keystones	21	46	.313	50	14‍–‍21	7‍–‍25
Kansas City Cowboys	16	63	.203	61	11‍–‍23	5‍–‍40

=== Record vs. opponents ===
1884 Union Association record Sources:
Team	ALT	BLU	BSU	CUN	COR	KC	MIL	PHK	SLM	SPS	WST	WIL
Altoona	—	1–3	1–1	0–0	0–3	0–0	0–0	1–3	0–8	0–0	3–1	0–0
Baltimore	3–1	—	10–5–1	7–5	4–10	10–2	1–3	10–2	1–14	0–0	11–5	1–0
Boston	1–1	5–10–1	—	4–8–1	5–11	8–4	2–2	8–3	8–8	0–0	12–4	5–0
Chicago/Pittsburgh	0–0	5–7	8–4–1	—	7–8	12–4	0–0	3–5	2–14	0–0	4–8–1	0–0
Cincinnati	3–0	10–4	11–5	8–7	—	9–1	0–0	9–0	4–12	3–0	10–6	2–1
Kansas City	0–0	2–10	4–8	4–12	1–9	—	0–0	0–4	0–11–1	1–1–1	4–8–1	0–0
Milwaukee	0–0	3–1	2–2	0–0	0–0	0–0	—	0–0	0–0	0–0	3–1	0–0
Philadelphia	3–1	2–10	3–8	5–3	0–9	4–0	0–0	—	0–8	0–0	4–7	0–0
St. Louis	8–0	14–1	8–8	14–2	12–4	11–0–1	0–0	8–0	—	2–1	13–3	4–0
St. Paul	0–0	0–0	0–0	0–0	0–3	1–1–1	0–0	0–0	1–2	—	0–0	0–0
Washington	1–3	5–11	4–12	8–4–1	6–10	8–4–1	1–3	7–4	3–13	0–0	—	4–1
Wilmington	0–0	0–1	0–5	0–0	1–2	0–0	0–0	0–0	0–4	0–0	1–4	—

=== Roster ===
1884 Philadelphia Keystones
Roster
Pitchers: Jersey Bakley; Dave Drew; John Fischer; Bill Gallagher; Al Maul; Sam Weaver	Catchers: Pat Carroll; Tom Daly; Robert Foster; Tom Gillen; Bill Jones; Fergy Malone; John O'Donnell; Infielders: Clarence Cross; Henry Easterday; Billy Geer; Jerry McCormick; John McGuinness; Levi Meyerle; Elias Peak; Chris Rickley; Fred Siegel	Outfielders: Jack Clements; Joe Flynn; Buster Hoover; Lefty Johnson; Bill Kienzle; Henry Luff; George Patterson	Manager: Fergy Malone

== Player stats ==
=== Batting ===
==== Starters by position ====
Note: Pos = Position; G = Games played; AB = At bats; H = Hits; Avg. = Batting average; HR = Home runs; RBI = Runs batted in

Pos	Player	G	AB	H	Avg.	HR
C	Tom Gillen	29	116	18	.155	0
1B	John McGuinness	53	210	52	.236	0
2B	Elias Peak	54	215	42	.195	0
3B	Jerry McCormick	67	295	84	.285	0
SS	Henry Easterday	28	115	28	.243	0
OF	Buster Hoover	63	275	100	.364	0
OF	Joe Flynn	52	209	52	.249	4
OF	Bill Kienzle	67	299	76	.254	0

==== Other batters ====
Note: G = Games played; AB = At bats; H = Hits; Avg. = Batting average; HR = Home runs; RBI = Runs batted in

Player	G	AB	H	Avg.	HR
Jack Clements	41	177	50	.282	3
Henry Luff	26	111	30	.270	0
Billy Geer	9	36	9	.250	0
Fred Siegel	8	31	7	.226	0
Chris Rickley	6	25	5	.200	0
Pat Carroll	5	19	3	.158	0
Bill Jones	4	14	2	.143	0
Levi Meyerle	3	11	1	.091	0
Clarence Cross	2	9	2	.222	0
Dave Drew	2	9	4	.444	0
Tom Daly	2	8	0	.000	0
George Patterson	2	7	1	.143	0
Fergy Malone	1	4	1	.250	0
John O'Donnell	1	4	1	.250	0
Lefty Johnson	1	4	0	.000	0
Robert Foster	1	3	1	.333	0

=== Pitching ===
==== Starting pitchers ====
Note: G = Games pitched; IP = Innings pitched; W = Wins; L = Losses; ERA = Earned run average; SO = Strikeouts

Player	G	IP	W	L	ERA	SO
Jersey Bakley	39	344.2	14	25	4.47	204
Sam Weaver	17	136.0	5	10	5.76	40
John Fischer	8	70.2	1	7	3.57	42
Bill Gallagher	3	25.0	1	2	3.24	12
Al Maul	1	8.0	0	1	4.50	7

==== Relief pitchers ====
Note: G = Games pitched; W = Wins; L = Losses; SV = Saves; ERA = Earned run average; SO = Strikeouts

Player	G	W	L	SV	ERA	SO
Dave Drew	1	0	1	0	3.86	2
Jerry McCormick	1	0	0	0	9.00	3
