= Charlie Barber =

American baseball player (c. 1854 – 1910)

- Third baseman
- Born: c. 1854; Philadelphia, Pennsylvania, U.S.
- Died: November 23, 1910 (aged 55–56); Philadelphia, Pennsylvania, U.S.
- Batted: Right Threw: Right

MLB debut
- April 17, 1884, for the Cincinnati Outlaw Reds

Last MLB appearance
- August 10, 1884, for the Cincinnati Outlaw Reds

MLB statistics
- Batting average: .201
- Hits: 41
- RBIs: 0
- Stats at Baseball Reference

Teams
- Cincinnati Outlaw Reds (1884)

Charles D. Barber (c. 1854 – November 23, 1910) was a 19th-century American baseball third baseman for the Cincinnati Outlaw Reds of the Union Association in 1884. He appeared in 55 games for the Reds and hit .201. He continued to play professionally in the minor leagues until 1887 in the New England League.
