= Fergy Malone =

American baseball player (1844–1905)

- Catcher
- Born: August 1844; County Tyrone, Ireland
- Died: January 1, 1905 (aged 60); Seattle, Washington, U.S.
- Batted: Right Threw: Right

Major league debut
- May 20, 1871, for the Philadelphia Athletics

Last major league appearance
- April 17, 1884, for the Philadelphia Keystones

Major league statistics
- Batting average: .274
- Home runs: 1
- Runs batted in: 157
- Stats at Baseball Reference

Teams
- National Association of Base Ball Players Philadelphia Athletics (1864, 1870) Keystone of Philadelphia (1865) Diamond State Base Ball Club of Wilmington, Delaware (1866) Quaker City of Philadelphia (1867) Washington Olympics (1868–1869) League player Philadelphia Athletics (1871–1872) Philadelphia White Stockings (1873) Chicago White Stockings (1874) Philadelphia White Stockings (1875) Philadelphia Athletics (1876) Philadelphia Keystones (1884) League manager Philadelphia White Stockings (1873) Chicago White Stockings (1874) Philadelphia Keystones (1884)

Fergus G. Malone (August, 1844 – January 1, 1905) was an American amateur and professional baseball player in the 1860s and 1870s. He was the catcher for the Philadelphia Athletics in 1871, champion of the first professional league season.

Born 1842 in County Tyrone, Ireland, Malone was one of four Irish natives to play in the first National Association season and one of five in the first National League season. If the NA is disregarded as a major league, he and Andy Leonard share distinction as the first major leaguers born in Ireland, their teams having met in the first NL game, 22 April 1876 (Leonard is first overall taking the NA into account).

Although a right-handed thrower, Malone was mainly a catcher with major teams, both amateur and pro. Physically it was a demanding position, no one using a face mask or regularly using a glove. (Doug Allison used buckskin mittens in 1870, but gloves and masks were only adopted for regular use by some catchers beginning in the late 1870s.)

Malone was the primary catcher for the Philadelphia Athletics 1871–72, Philadelphia White Stockings 1873, and Chicago White Stockings 1874. In 1873–74, he was team captain, earning manager's credit today. He returned to the Philadelphia Whites and played in eight games in 1875, then returned to the Philadelphia Athletics for the inaugural National League season, catching 20 of 60 games.

Malone was the highest paid player in professional baseball in 1874, with an annual salary of $2,800 (equivalent to $79,676 in 2025).

Fergy Malone was 34 when the Athletics were expelled from the National League, which contracted from eight to six for 1877. He returned to the majors with the one-year Union Association in 1884, managing its Philadelphia entry and playing in one game. In 220 major league games Fergy Malone batted .274 with one home run, 157 runs batted in, and 200 runs scored. He was a player-manager for his teams in 1873, 1874, and 1884, recording a total of 47 wins and 66 losses.

Malone died 1905 in Seattle, Washington, at the age of 60. He is buried at New Cathedral Cemetery in Philadelphia.

The Society for American Baseball Research lists Malone as a Civil War veteran, having enlisted in a hundred days’ regiment on July 15, 1864, serving with Dick McBride as a private and corporal in Company A, 196th Pennsylvania.

== See also ==
- List of Major League Baseball player–managers
