= Ed Kennedy (infielder) =

American baseball player (1861–1912)

- Third Baseman/Shortstop
- Born: April 5, 1861; Bellevue, Kentucky
- Died: December 22, 1912 (aged 51); Cheyenne, Wyoming
- Batted: Right Threw: Right

MLB debut
- May 17, 1884, for the Cincinnati Outlaw Reds

Last MLB appearance
- August 1, 1884, for the Cincinnati Outlaw Reds

MLB statistics
- Batting average: .208
- Hits: 10
- RBIs: 0
- Stats at Baseball Reference

Teams
- Cincinnati Outlaw Reds (1884)

William Edward Kennedy (April 5, 1861 – December 22, 1912) was a 19th-century baseball third baseman for the Cincinnati Outlaw Reds of the Union Association in 1884. He appeared in 13 games for the Reds and hit .208.
