= Lou Sylvester =

American baseball player (1855–1936)

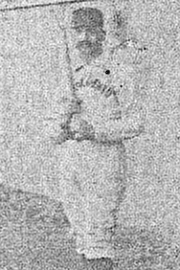
- Outfielder
- Born: February 14, 1855; Springfield, Illinois, U.S.
- Died: May 5, 1936 (aged 81); Brooklyn, New York, U.S.
- Batted: Right Threw: Right

MLB debut
- April 18, 1884, for the Cincinnati Outlaw Reds

Last MLB appearance
- August 14, 1887, for the St. Louis Browns

MLB statistics
- Batting average: .243
- Hits: 159
- Runs: 138
- Stats at Baseball Reference

Teams
- Cincinnati Outlaw Reds (1884); Louisville Colonels (1886); Cincinnati Red Stockings (1886); St. Louis Browns (1887)

Louis J. Sylvester (February 14, 1855 – May 5, 1936) was an American Major League Baseball player who played outfield from 1882–1887. He would play for the Cincinnati Outlaw Reds, Cincinnati Red Stockings, Louisville Colonels, and St. Louis Browns.
