= Bill Schwartz (catcher) =

American baseball player (1864–1940)

- Catcher
- Born: April 3, 1864; Jamestown, Kentucky
- Died: December 22, 1940 (aged 76); Newport, Kentucky
- Batted: Right Threw: Right

MLB debut
- May 3, 1883, for the Columbus Buckeyes

Last MLB appearance
- August 7, 1884, for the Cincinnati Outlaw Reds

MLB statistics
- Batting average: .236
- Hits: 110
- RBIs: 14
- Stats at Baseball Reference

Teams
- Columbus Buckeyes (1883); Cincinnati Outlaw Reds (1884)

William August Schwartz (April 3, 1864 – December 22, 1940) was a 19th-century baseball catcher who played for two seasons. He was born in Jamestown, Kentucky, and was Jewish. He played for the Columbus Buckeyes of the American Association in 1883 and the Cincinnati Outlaw Reds of the Union Association in 1884, playing in 31 career games.
