= Martin Powell (baseball) =

American baseball player (1856–1888)

- First baseman
- Born: March 25, 1856; Fitchburg, Massachusetts, U.S.
- Died: February 5, 1888 (aged 31); Fitchburg, Massachusetts, U.S.
- Batted: Left Threw: Left

MLB debut
- June 18, 1881, for the Detroit Wolverines

Last MLB appearance
- August 10, 1884, for the Cincinnati Outlaw Reds

MLB statistics
- Batting average: .283
- Home runs: 3
- Runs batted in: 115
- Stats at Baseball Reference

Teams
- Detroit Wolverines (1881–1883); Cincinnati Outlaw Reds (1884)

Martin J. Powell (March 25, 1856 – February 5, 1888) was an American professional baseball player from 1878 to 1884. He played four seasons of Major League Baseball as a first baseman for the Detroit Wolverines from 1881 to 1883 and the Cincinnati Outlaw Reds in 1884.

In his rookie season in the major leagues, Powell compiled a .338 batting average that was second in the National League behind only Cap Anson. In 279 games over five major league seasons, he compiled a .283 batting average with 213 runs scored, 43 doubles, 11 triples, three home runs, and 115 runs batted in. Powell retired after the 1884 season due to impaired health and died of consumption (an arcane term for tuberculosis) in 1888 at age 31.

== Early years ==
Powell was born in Fitchburg, Massachusetts, in 1856. He began playing baseball as a boy, and played amateur baseball with the Grattan Club. In his amateur career, he played as both a catcher and a first baseman.

== Professional baseball career ==
=== Minor leagues ===
In 1878, Powell began his professional baseball career as a first baseman and "change catcher" for the Lowell, Massachusetts, team in the International Association. He compiled a .309 batting average and .858 fielding percentage.

The following year, he played first base for the Holyoke, Massachusetts, team of the National Association and compiled a .368 batting average. His batting average was the second-highest in the league. Holyoke finished the year ranked second among the eight teams competing for the International Cup.

In 1880, Powell played first base for the Washington, D.C., team in the National Association. The team finished in first place in their league, and Powell had a .292 batting average and 74 total bases in 48 games. The National Association disbanded after the 1880 season, and Powell began the 1881 season with the Washington baseball club which that year joined the Eastern Championship Association.

=== Major leagues ===
In the middle of June 1881, Powell was recruited by Frank Bancroft to join the Detroit Wolverines of the National League. He replaced first baseman Lew Brown who had been released by the team for alcohol and disciplinary reasons. Upon joining the Wolverines, Powell was described as being six feet tall, "rather spare in build, although weighing 175 pounds, brown hair and eyes and gentlemanly in appearance." In his rookie season at Detroit, Powell compiled a .338 batting average and .380 on-base percentage, both of which led the Detroit team and ranked second in the National League behind Cap Anson. He stayed with the Detroit club for three full seasons, batting .240 in 1882 and .273 in 1883. He also led the National League in 1883 in both double plays (62) and errors at first base (54).

In 1884, Powell jumped to the newly formed Union Association, playing for the Cincinnati Outlaw Reds. He compiled a .319 batting average in 43 games for the Outlaw Reds.

In 279 games over five major league seasons, Powell compiled a .283 batting average with 213 runs scored, 43 doubles, 11 triples, three home runs, and 115 runs batted in.

== Later years ==
After the 1884 season, Powell retired from baseball due to impaired health and went into business with his brother. He died of consumption (an outdated term usually referring to tuberculosis) at his home in Fitchburg, Massachusetts, in February 1888. He was 31 years old at the time of his death. Following his death, a writer in the Sporting Life noted: "Martin Powell was a model man, a kind friend, a devoted Catholic, loved and respected by all." He was buried at St. Bernard's Cemetery.
