= Bill Jones (catcher) =

American baseball player

- Catcher/Outfielder
- Born: Unknown; Syracuse, New York, U.S.
- Died: Unknown
- Batted: Unknown Threw: Unknown

MLB debut
- July 17, 1884, for the Philadelphia Keystones

Last MLB appearance
- July 23, 1884, for the Philadelphia Keystones

MLB statistics
- Batting average: .143
- Home runs: 0
- Stats at Baseball Reference

Teams
- Philadelphia Keystones (1884)

William Jones was an American professional baseball player who played catcher and outfield in the American Association for the 1884 Philadelphia Keystones.
