= Bill Harbridge =

American baseball player (1855–1924)

- Catcher/Center fielder
- Born: March 29, 1855; Philadelphia, Pennsylvania, US
- Died: March 17, 1924 (aged 68); Philadelphia, Pennsylvania, US
- Batted: Left Threw: Left

MLB debut
- May 15, 1875, for the Hartford Dark Blues

Last MLB appearance
- October 3, 1884, for the Cincinnati Outlaw Reds

MLB statistics
- Batting average: .247
- Home runs: 2
- Runs batted in: 114
- Stats at Baseball Reference

Teams
- Hartford Dark Blues (1875–1877); Chicago White Stockings (1878–1879); Troy Trojans (1880, 1882); Philadelphia Quakers (1883); Cincinnati Outlaw Reds (1884)

William Arthur Harbridge (March 29, 1855 – March 17, 1924), also known as "Yaller Bill", was a Major League Baseball player who split his playing time between catcher and in the outfield for five different teams during his nine-season career that lasted from 1875 through 1884.

== Career ==
He began his career in the last year of the National Association and finished with the Union Association in its only year of existence.

On May 6, 1876, Bill is credited as becoming the first left-handed catcher in major league baseball history. He died in his hometown of Philadelphia at the age of 68, and was interred at Fernwood Cemetery in Fernwood, Pennsylvania.

In November 1885, Cincinnati's Enquirer newspaper announced that "Yaller Bill Harbridge [would] manage the Augusta (Ga.) club next season."
