= Bill Hawes =

American baseball player (1853–1940)

- Outfielder / First baseman
- Born: November 17, 1853; Nashua, New Hampshire, U.S.
- Died: June 16, 1940 (aged 86); Lowell, Massachusetts, U.S.
- Batted: Right Threw: Right

MLB debut
- May 1, 1879, for the Boston Red Caps

Last MLB appearance
- October 15, 1884, for the Cincinnati Outlaw Reds

MLB statistics
- Batting average: .254
- Hits: 128
- Runs: 99
- Stats at Baseball Reference

Teams
- Boston Red Caps (1879); Cincinnati Outlaw Reds (1884)

William Hildreth Hawes (November 17, 1853 – June 16, 1940) was an American professional baseball player in the late 19th century. He mainly played in minor league level, but made two stints in the major leagues. His first season in the majors, in 1879, he played for the Boston Red Caps. He was one of only thirteen players for the team. He played rather poorly, having a batting average of just .200 and making ten errors in the outfield. He would not play again in the majors until 1884 for the Cincinnati Outlaw Reds. He hit .278 but still fielded poorly, making 27 errors as an outfielder and first baseman. In 1893 he finished his career for the Lowell ball club in the New England League.
