= John Kelly (catcher) =

American baseball player (1859–1908)

- Catcher
- Born: March 3, 1859; Paterson, New Jersey, U.S.
- Died: April 13, 1908 (aged 49); Paterson, New Jersey, U.S.
- Batted: Right Threw: Right

MLB debut
- June 7, 1879, for the Cleveland Blues

Last MLB appearance
- October 19, 1884, for the Washington Nationals

MLB statistics
- Batting average: .226
- Hits: 106
- Home runs: 1
- Stats at Baseball Reference

Teams
- Cleveland Blues (1879, 1882); Baltimore Orioles (1883); Philadelphia Quakers (1883); Cincinnati Outlaw Reds (1884); Washington Nationals (1884)

John Francis Kelly (March 3, 1859 – April 13, 1908) was an American Major League Baseball player. As a player, he was primarily a catcher, but also played 17 games as an outfielder and one game as a first baseman. He played for the Cleveland Blues of the National League in 1879 and 1882, both the National League Philadelphia Quakers and the American Association's Baltimore Orioles in 1883 and the Cincinnati Outlaw Reds and Washington Nationals, both of the Union Association in 1884, so that he played in three different Major Leagues in his four-year career.

His time with the Blues in 1879 consisted of a single game on June 7. Kelly played both catcher and first baseman during the game, and got one hit in four at bats. In 1880, The Only Nolan recruited him to play for a team in Frisco, Texas but he returned home to New Jersey when his father died. In 1883 he played in 30 games for the Blues, all at catcher, and had 14 hits in 104 at-bats for a batting average of .135. He played 48 games for the Orioles in 1883, with 38 at catcher and 13 in the outfield. He had 46 hits in 202 at-bats for a batting average of .228. He only played one game for the Quakers in 1883, going hitless in three at-bats. In 1884 he played mostly for the Outlaw Reds, playing in 38 games, almost all at catcher. He had 40 hits in 142 at-bats for a .282 batting average, and hit his only Major League home run. He also played four games for the Nationals in 1884, with 5 hits in 14 at-bats. For his Major League career, he had 106 hits in 469 at-bats for a .226 batting average, and hit one home run. As a fielder, he made 142 errors in 835 chances, for a fielding percentage of .830.

Besides playing in the Union Association in 1884, Kelly also served as an umpire for three Union Association games in October 1884. Some sources list John F. Kelly as the manager of the Louisville Colonels in 1888 and 1889. But others claim John O. Kelly, also known as Kick Kelly, was the Colonels' manager in those seasons. He was born and died in Paterson, New Jersey and is buried at Holy Sepulchre Cemetery in Totowa, New Jersey.
