= Nat Jewett =

American baseball player (1844–1914)

- Catcher
- Born: December 25, 1844; New York, New York, U.S.
- Died: February 23, 1914 (aged 69); Bronx, New York, U.S.
- Batted: Unknown Threw: Unknown

MLB debut
- July 4, 1872, for the Brooklyn Eckfords

Last MLB appearance
- July 6, 1872, for the Brooklyn Eckfords

MLB statistics
- Games played: 2
- Runs scored: 1
- Hits: 1
- Batting average: .125
- Stats at Baseball Reference

Teams
- National Association of Base Ball Players Henry Eckford of Brooklyn (1863) Empire of New York (1864–1865) New York Mutuals (1866–1868) Brooklyn Eckfords (1869–1870) National Association of Professional BBP Brooklyn Eckfords (1872)

Nathan W. Jewett (December 25, 1844 – February 23, 1914) was an American professional baseball player born in New York City who played catcher in the National Association of Professional Base Ball Players for the 1872 Brooklyn Eckfords.

On May 28, 1861, he enlisted in the 71st Pennsylvania Infantry Regiment. In 1918, his former teammate on the New York Mutuals, Phonney Martin, recalled that an early practitioner of the curveball who lacked control was forgotten after Jewett proved unable to reliably catch his pitches.

He died at the age of 69 in the Bronx, New York and is buried at the Kensico Cemetery in Valhalla, New York.
