= Ri Jones =

American baseball player (1859–1936)

- Infielder
- Born: February 4, 1859; Terrace Park, Ohio
- Died: November 29, 1936 (aged 77); Fresno, California
- Batted: Right Threw: Right

MLB debut
- August 13, 1883, for the Louisville Eclipse

Last MLB appearance
- August 27, 1884, for the Cincinnati Outlaw Reds

MLB statistics
- Batting average: .254
- Home runs: 2
- Runs scored: 37
- Stats at Baseball Reference

Teams
- Louisville Eclipse (1883); Cincinnati Outlaw Reds (1884)

Uriah Louis "Ri" Jones (February 4, 1859 – November 29, 1936) was an American Major League Baseball player who played infield from 1883 to 1884. He played for the Louisville Eclipse and Cincinnati Outlaw Reds.

During the few years that Jones played professional baseball, he would spend his winters working on the railroads. Believing there was no future for him in baseball, Jones eventually quit the sport so that he could work on the railroads year-round.
