= Sam Crane (second baseman) =

American baseball player and manager (1854–1925)

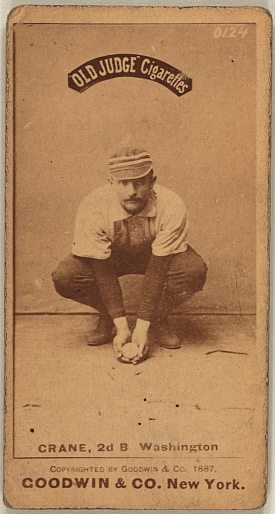
- Second baseman
- Born: January 2, 1854; Springfield, Massachusetts, U.S.
- Died: June 26, 1925 (aged 71); New York City, New York, U.S.
- Batted: Right Threw: Right

MLB debut
- May 1, 1880, for the Buffalo Bisons

Last MLB appearance
- June 28, 1890, for the New York Giants

MLB statistics
- Batting average: .203
- Home runs: 0
- Runs batted in: 35
- Stats at Baseball Reference

Teams
- As player: Buffalo Bisons (1880); New York Metropolitans (1883); Cincinnati Outlaw Reds (1884); Detroit Wolverines (1885–1886); St. Louis Maroons (1886); Washington Nationals (1887); New York Giants (1890); Pittsburgh Alleghenys (1890); As manager: Buffalo Bisons (1880); Cincinnati Outlaw Reds (1884)

Samuel Newhall Crane (January 2, 1854 – June 26, 1925) was an American second baseman and manager in Major League Baseball born in Springfield, Massachusetts. Crane played for eight different major league teams during his seven-year career that spanned from 1880 to 1890. During two of those seasons, he acted as a player-manager, once for the 1880 Buffalo Bisons of the National League and the 1884 Cincinnati Outlaw Reds of the short-lived Union Association.

== Career ==
His career ended when he was arrested after having an affair with the wife of a fruit dealer and stealing $1,500 from the husband. After his playing days, Sam had a long and distinguished career as a sportswriter. In 1895, when he was writing for the New York Advertiser, he had become the center of a controversy when he wrote an article that harshly criticized the owner of the New York Giants, Andrew Freedman. Freedman, upon learning of existence of the article, barred Sam from entering the Polo Grounds. When Crane showed up for the August 16 game, he learned that his season pass was taken and his efforts to purchase a ticket were foiled.

It was his connection to baseball as a player, manager, and sportswriter that lent credibility to his assertion that Cooperstown, New York be the location for a "memorial" to the great players from the past. Cooperstown was, at the time, the place that many people believed where Abner Doubleday had invented the game of baseball. It was this idea of a memorial that eventually led to the creation of the National Baseball Hall of Fame and Museum in 1939.

Crane died at the age of 71 of pneumonia in New York City, and is interred at the Lutheran All Faith Cemetery in Middle Village, New York.

== See also ==
- List of Major League Baseball player–managers
