= Dan O'Leary =

American baseball player (1856–1922)

- Outfielder/Manager
- Born: October 22, 1856; Detroit, Michigan, U.S.
- Died: June 24, 1922 (aged 65); Chicago, Illinois, U.S.
- Batted: Left Threw: Unknown

MLB debut
- September 3, 1879, for the Providence Grays

Last MLB appearance
- August 6, 1884, for the Cincinnati Outlaw Reds

MLB statistics
- Games played: 45
- At bats: 181
- Batting average: .243
- Stats at Baseball Reference

Teams
- As player: Providence Grays (1879); Boston Red Caps (1880); Detroit Wolverines (1881); Worcester Ruby Legs (1882); Cincinnati Outlaw Reds (1884); As manager: Cincinnati Outlaw Reds (1884)

Daniel O'Leary (October 22, 1856 – June 24, 1922), also known as "Hustlin' Dan", was an American Major League Baseball player from Detroit. He played in the outfield sparingly for five seasons with five different teams from 1879 to 1884. The last season he played and managed the Cincinnati Outlaw Reds of the Union Association.

O'Leary died in Chicago at the age of 65, and was buried at Mount Carmel Cemetery in Hillside, Illinois.

== See also ==
- List of Major League Baseball player–managers
