= Dick Burns =

American baseball player (1863–1937)

- Pitcher / Outfielder
- Born: December 26, 1863; Holyoke, Massachusetts, U.S.
- Died: November 16, 1937 (aged 73); Holyoke, Massachusetts, U.S.
- Batted: Left Threw: Left

MLB debut
- May 3, 1883, for the Detroit Wolverines

Last MLB appearance
- July 23, 1885, for the St. Louis Maroons

MLB statistics
- Win–loss record: 25–27
- Earned run average: 3.07
- Strikeouts: 199
- Stats at Baseball Reference

Teams
- Detroit Wolverines (1883); Cincinnati Outlaw Reds (1884); St. Louis Maroons (1885)

Career highlights and awards
- Pitched a no-hitter on August 26, 1884

Richard Simon Burns (December 26, 1863 – November 16, 1937) was an American professional baseball player from 1883 to 1890. He played three seasons in Major League Baseball, principally as a pitcher and outfielder, for the Detroit Wolverines (37 games, 1883), Cincinnati Outlaw Reds (79 games, 1884) and St. Louis Maroons (14 games, 1885).

During his major league career, Burns appeared in 82 games as an outfielder, 58 as a pitcher and two as a shortstop. He compiled a .267 batting average and scored 97 runs in 544 at bats. As a pitcher, he compiled a 25–27 (.481) win–loss record with a 3.07 earned run average (ERA).

During the 1884 season, he led the Union Association (UA) with 12 triples, ranked third in the league with a .457 slugging percentage, and compiled a 23–15 record and 2.46 ERA as pitcher, and threw a no-hitter. Baseball historian Bill James in The New Bill James Historical Baseball Abstract has cited Burns's dramatically improved performance in 1884 in support of his view that the UA was not a true major league. Although his major league career ended in July 1885, Burns continued to play minor league baseball through the 1890 season and later became a cigar and tobacco seller in his hometown of Holyoke, Massachusetts.

== Early years ==
Burns was born in Holyoke, Massachusetts, in 1863. His parents, Thomas and Bridget (Hoy) Burns, were both immigrants from Ireland. At the time of the 1880 U.S. Census, Burns's father was employed as a carpenter. At age 16, Burns worked in a cotton mill, as did his older siblings, Margaret, James and Mary. In 1882, at age 18, Burns began his baseball career playing for the Holyoke club in his hometown.

== Professional baseball ==
=== Detroit ===
Burns began his major league career at age 19 with the 1883 Detroit Wolverines of the National League. He appeared in 37 games for the Wolverines, 24 as an outfielder and 17 as a pitcher. In early April 1883, the Detroit Free Press reported on the Wolverines' pre-season pitching practice—conducted in the main hall of Detroit's Music Hall. The newspaper reported that the team's new pitcher, Burns, was 5 feet, 7 inches tall, weighed only 140 pounds (a weight that, "with proper training, will doubtless increase"), showed good command of the ball and was developing an "up-shoot" pitch that was "a beauty." A veteran player who observed Burns in spring practice praised his "clever change of pace" and shared the Free Press's view that "his up-shoots will be hard to hit." According to The Dickson Baseball Dictionary, the uses of the term "up-shoot" in April 1883, in reference to Burns's pitches, are the first known uses of the term. An "upshoot" in baseball is a curve ball that appears to rise as it approaches the plate.

Despite the beauty of his "up-shoot" pitch, Burns played for a seventh place team that compiled a 40–58 record. In his first major league game, on May 3, 1883, Burns was the losing pitcher in a 10-1 defeat against the Chicago White Stockings. Burns gave up 12 hits and three bases on balls in nine innings, but his team also committed 10 errors (including three by shortstop Sadie Houck), and the Detroit Free Press was upbeat about Burns's debut performance:

"Burns, the new pitcher, made his first appearance in the box as a league twirler, and was, naturally enough, nervous, especially as he was facing the sluggers of the champion team. It was hoped that he would be well supported, but he was not. The only wonder is that he 'stood up' as well as he did. Many an old pitcher would have weakened under such circumstances. He made a good impression, however, the nearly universal expression of the spectators being that he came out of the game with credit. He made errors himself, muffing a fly, and giving three men bases on called balls, but these were to be expected under the circumstances, and he has no cause to be disheartened; quite the contrary."

For the season as a whole, Burns compiled a 2–12 (.143) win–loss record and a 4.51 earned run average (ERA). As a batter, Burns compiled a .186 batting average. His Wins Above Replacement (WAR) for the 1883 season was -1.8.

=== Cincinnati ===
In 1884, Burns joined the Cincinnati Outlaw Reds of the newly-formed and short-lived Union Association (UA). Competing against the lower talent level in the UA, Burns had the best year of his career. As a pitcher, he started 40 games (34 of them complete games) and compiled a 23–15 win–loss record and a 2.46 ERA in 329 2/3 innings. He also pitched a no-hitter on August 26, 1884, against the Kansas City Cowboys, the first of only two no-hitters pitched in the UA. His no-hitter was also the first ever hurled by a major league ballplayer of a Cincinnati club.

Burns improved dramatically as a batter against UA pitching. His batting average jumped by 120 points over the prior season to .306. He led the UA with 12 triples and ranked among the league leaders with a .457 slugging percentage (3rd), a .306 batting average (7th), 84 runs scored (7th), and 33 extra base hits (8th). His WAR rating of 4.0 (an increase of 5.8 over his 1883 rating) was the ninth highest in the UA. Burns also appeared in six games for the Newark Domestics of the Eastern League during the 1884 season.

Baseball historian Bill James in The New Bill James Historical Baseball Abstract has cited Burns as one of the players supporting his view that the UA was not a true major league. James noted that Burns did not make the grade with Detroit in 1883, became "one of the best players" in the UA, earning him "another look" in the National League, lasting only 14 games. In support of his contention that Burns was not able to compete at a major league level, James asserts that Burns was "released by Detroit in mid-summer, 1883." The latter statement by James is erroneous. An account published in the Detroit Free Press on October 1, 1883, reports that Burns was Detroit's right fielder in the final game of the season. Other game accounts show him playing in games for Detroit in August 1883 (right field on August 7 and 8, 1883; right and center field on August 9, 1883) and September 1883 (right field on September 5, 1883).

=== 1885 season ===
The Union Association merged with the National League after the 1884 season, and Burns began the 1885 season with the Milwaukee Brewers of the newly-formed Western League. He appeared in 31 games for the Brewers and was the team's center fielder. He was also the Brewers' highest paid player. with one newspaper reporting he was paid a salary of $1,700, and another source stating that he was signed for $2,500 and $200 in advance money. However, the Western League folded in mid-June 1885.

On June 24, 1885, The Sporting Life reported that the Cincinnati Reds had made an offer to Burns. Burns opted instead to sign with the St. Louis Maroons of the National League. Burns appeared in 14 games for the Maroons, 14 games in the outfield (principally center field) and three innings as a relief pitcher in one game. A newspaper account of his first game for St. Louis, on July 6, 1885, noted: "Dick Burns made his inaugural appearance as a member of the St. Louis Club, and distinguished himself in the sixth inning by making a remarkable running backward catch of a line hit from Gilligan's bat, which really saved the game." Again facing tougher competition in the National League, Burns's batting average dropped 84 points from the prior season to .222. He appeared in his final major league game on July 23, 1885, a 15–3 loss to the New York Giants in which Burns played center field, had no hits in four at bats, and committed two errors in three chances for the Maroons.

In early July 1885, The Sporting Life reported that Burns was signed to play for the minor league baseball club in Waterbury, Connecticut, at a salary of $200 a month. He appeared in 26 games for Waterbury during the 1885 season as the team shifted from the Eastern League to the Connecticut State League and finally to the Southern New England League.

=== Minor leagues ===
Although his major league career ended in July 1885, Burns continued to play minor league baseball through the 1890 season. He began the 1886 season playing for Tim Murnane's Boston Blues in the New England League. In early June 1886, Burns, at age 22, was also given managerial responsibility for the club in Murnane's absence, becoming a player-manager. Burns concluded the 1886 season playing in the outfield, principally right field, for the Brockton, Massachusetts club in the New England League.

In April 1887, Burns signed with the New Haven Blues of the Eastern League. He appeared in 56 games for New Haven. In late July 1887, the Lowell Magicians of the New England League purchased Burns's release from the New Haven club. Burns appeared in 39 games for Lowell during the latter half of the 1887 season.

Burns played the 1888 season with the Scranton Miners of the Central League. The Sporting Life reported that, while playing for Scranton in 1888, Burns had been "certainly one of the finest fielders, batters and base-runners of the Central League."

In late April 1889, The Sporting Life reported that Burns had not been signed for the 1889 season and was at his home in Holyoke, Massachusetts. He was ultimately signed by, and played for, the Auburn Yankees of the New York State League, but he was released by Auburn in June 1889. He was then picked up by the Lowell, Massachusetts club in the Atlantic Association where he played during the last half of the 1889 season. On July 26, 1889, Burns pitched a two-hitter against Worcester. The Sporting Life reported that he pitched "a magnificent game."

Burns's professional baseball career concluded in 1890 with the Hartford, Connecticut club in the Atlantic Association. He was released in May 1890, at age 26, after playing in only one game.

Although information is not available as to the year, Burns is reported to have played one or two games for the Brattleboros of Brattleboro, Vermont, and to have thereafter served as an umpire there.

== Later years ==
After retiring from baseball, Burns continued living in his hometown of Holyoke, Massachusetts. In 1894, he was an alderman in that city. In 1900, he remained in Holyoke, residing with his mother (Bridget Burns) and sister (Margaret Parker); he was employed at that time as a cigar dealer. In 1910 and 1920, Burns was still living in Holyoke with his sister, Margaret Parker. He was employed in 1910 as a bookkeeper at a cigar store and in 1920 as the proprietor of a cigar and tobacco retail store. In 1930, Burns was an "inmate" at the Holyoke City Home on Upper Springfield Road.

Burns died in Holyoke in 1937 at age 73. He was interred at the Calvary Cemetery in that city.

== See also ==
- List of Major League Baseball no-hitters
- List of Major League Baseball annual triples leaders

Achievements
Preceded by Pud Galvin	No-hitter pitcher August 26, 1884	Succeeded by Ed Cushman
