= Cincinnati Outlaw Reds =

American baseball team in 1884

The Cincinnati Outlaw Reds of 1884, also called the Cincinnati Unions, were a member of the short-lived Union Association. One of the league's best teams, they finished third with a record of 69–36. The team was owned by former Cincinnati Stars and Cincinnati Red Stockings owner Justus Thorner with John McLean, and played at the Stars and Reds old ballpark, the Bank Street Grounds. They were managed first by outfielder "Hustling Dan" O'Leary (20-15), then by second baseman Sam Crane (49–21).

Their top-hitting regular was outfielder/pitcher Dick Burns, who batted .306 with 4 home runs. The Outlaw Reds had three pitchers with outstanding records: Jim McCormick (21–3, 1.54), George Bradley (25–15, 2.71), and Burns (23-15, 2.46). On August 26, 1884, Burns threw a no-hitter against the Kansas City Cowboys and was the first ever hurled by a major league ballplayer of a Cincinnati club.

== See also ==
- 1884 Cincinnati Outlaw Reds season
