= 1901 Cincinnati Reds season =

1901 Cincinnati Reds
- League: National League
- Ballpark: League Park
- City: Cincinnati, Ohio
- Owners: John T. Brush
- Managers: Bid McPhee

The 1901 Cincinnati Reds season was a season in American baseball. The team finished in last place in the eight-team National League with a record of 52 wins and 87 losses, 38 games behind the Pittsburgh Pirates.

== Regular season ==
The Cincinnati Reds continued to rebuild by adding younger players to their roster in 1901. They finished the 1900 season with a 62–77 record, finishing in seventh place in the National League.

The team dismissed manager Bob Allen after only one season, and replaced him with Reds legend Bid McPhee. McPhee had played second base for Cincinnati from 1882 to 1899. The Reds acquired a new shortstop, as George Magoon joined the club. He last played in the majors in 1899, splitting time between the Baltimore Orioles and Chicago Orphans. Dick Harley, who played in only five games with the Reds in 1900, would get a starting job in left field. Harley's last full season was in 1899 with the Cleveland Spiders, when he hit .250 with a homer and 50 RBI.

Sam Crawford was a bright spot for the team, as he batted .330 with a league high sixteen home runs, while driving in 104 runners to lead the team offensively. Jake Beckley was solid once again, hitting .307 with three home runs and 79 RBI.

On the mound, Noodles Hahn had a very solid season, going 22–19 with a 2.71 ERA. Hahn led the league with 41 complete games, 375.1 innings pitched, and striking out 239 batters. Bill Phillips, with a 14–18 record and a 4.64 ERA, was the only other Cincinnati pitcher to have ten or more victories.

=== Season summary ===
Cincinnati got the season off on a good note, as they won four of their first five games to take a very early first place lead in the National League. The Reds would continue to hold on to first place through twenty-three games in, as they had a 15–8 record, a one-game lead over the New York Giants. Even though Cincinnati went 5–6 in their next eleven games, they held on to a first place tie with the Giants before losing ten games in a row to fall to seventh place with a 20–24 record. Some of their losses were lopsided, as the Reds lost 25–13 to the Giants to begin their losing streak, and in their tenth loss, they were on the wrong side of a 21–3 pasting by the Brooklyn Superbas.

After snapping their ten-game losing streak with a victory over the Philadelphia Phillies, the Reds lost four more in a row, including losses of 8–0 and 19–1 to the Phillies. Cincinnati continued to struggle for the rest of the season, falling into the cellar, and finished the year with a 52–87 record, 38 games behind the pennant-winning Pittsburgh Pirates. This marked the first time in team history that the Reds finished the season in last place.

=== Season standings ===
National League
Team	W	L	Pct.	GB	Home	Road
Pittsburgh Pirates	90	49	.647	—	45‍–‍24	45‍–‍25
Philadelphia Phillies	83	57	.593	7½	46‍–‍23	37‍–‍34
Brooklyn Superbas	79	57	.581	9½	43‍–‍25	36‍–‍32
St. Louis Cardinals	76	64	.543	14½	40‍–‍31	36‍–‍33
Boston Beaneaters	69	69	.500	20½	41‍–‍29	28‍–‍40
Chicago Orphans	53	86	.381	37	30‍–‍39	23‍–‍47
New York Giants	52	85	.380	37	30‍–‍38	22‍–‍47
Cincinnati Reds	52	87	.374	38	27‍–‍43	25‍–‍44

=== Record vs. opponents ===
1901 National League record Sources:
Team	BSN	BRO	CHC	CIN	NYG	PHI	PIT	STL
Boston	—	10–10	13–6	11–8–1	14–6–1	7–13	5–15	9–11
Brooklyn	10–10	—	13–7	14–6–1	11–6	11–9	11–8	9–11
Chicago	6–13	7–13	—	10–10	11–9–1	3–17	6–14	10–10
Cincinnati	8–11–1	6–14–1	10–10	—	8–12	4–16	7–13	9–11–1
New York	6–14–1	6–11	9–11–1	12–8	—	8–12	4–16–1	7–13–1
Philadelphia	13–7	9–11	17–3	16–4	12–8	—	7–13	9–11
Pittsburgh	15–5	8–11	14–6	13–7	16–4–1	13–7	—	11–9
St. Louis	11–9	11–9	10–10	11–9–1	13–7–1	11–9	9–11	—

=== Roster ===
1901 Cincinnati Reds
**Roster**
**Pitchers**: Charlie Case; Whitey Guese; Noodles Hahn; Crese Heismann; Barney McFadden; Doc Newton; Doc Parker; Bill Phillips; Amos Rusie; Dick Scott; Archie Stimmel; Jack Sutthoff; Len Swormstedt; Gus Weyhing	**Catchers**: Bill Bergen; Jerry Hurley; Mike Kahoe; Heinie Peitz; **Infielders**: Jake Beckley; Tommy Corcoran; Bill Fox; Emil Haberer; John Heileman; Charlie Irwin; Charlie Krause; George Magoon; Pete O'Brien; Harry Steinfeldt	**Outfielders**: Harry Bay; Sam Crawford; John Dobbs; Dick Harley; Algie McBride	**Manager**: Bid McPhee

=== Game log ===
1901 Game Log: 52–87 (Home 27–43, Road 25–44)
April: 4–3 (Home 1–1, Road 3–2)

#	Date	Opponent	Score	Win	Loss	Stadium	Attendance	Record	Streak
―	April 18	Pirates	Postponed (rain). Rescheduled to September 15.						
―	April 19	Pirates	Postponed (rain). Rescheduled to September 17.						
1	April 20	Pirates	2–4	Leever (1–0)	**Hahn** (0–1)	**League Park**	3,000	0–1	L1
―	April 22	Orphans	Postponed (rain). Rescheduled to July 29.						
―	April 23	Orphans	Postponed (wet grounds). Rescheduled to July 30.						
2	April 24	Orphans	10–9	**McFadden** (1–0)	Taylor (0–1)	**League Park**	200	1–1	W1
―	April 25	Orphans	Postponed (wet grounds). Rescheduled to July 31.						
3	April 26	@ Orphans	8–7	**Newton** (1–0)	Menefee (0–2)	West Side Grounds	3,200	2–1	W2
4	April 27	@ Orphans	9–2	**Hahn** (1–1)	Taylor (1–2)	West Side Grounds	3,900	3–1	W3
5	April 28	@ Orphans	6–4	**Phillips** (1–0)	Cunningham (0–1)	West Side Grounds	7,500	4–1	W4
6	April 29	@ Orphans	6–9	Hughes (1–1)	**McFadden** (1–1)	West Side Grounds	700	4–2	L1
7	April 30	@ Orphans	7–8	Menefee (1–2)	**Newton** (1–1)	West Side Grounds	600	4–3	L2

May: 12–9 (Home 3–2, Road 9–7)

#	Date	Opponent	Score	Win	Loss	Stadium	Attendance	Record	Streak
8	May 1	@ Cardinals	7–3	**Hahn** (2–1)	Jones (1–2)	Robison Field	6,000	5–3	W1
9	May 2	@ Cardinals	16–12	**Phillips** (2–0)	Murphy (0–1)	Robison Field	3,000	6–3	W2
10	May 4	@ Cardinals	4–4	—	—	Robison Field	5,000	6–3	T1
11	May 5	@ Cardinals	7–5	**Hahn** (3–1)	Breitenstein (0–2)	Robison Field	6,000	7–3	W1
12	May 6	Cardinals	8–13	Jones (2–2)	**McFadden** (1–2)	**League Park**	3,500	7–4	L1
13	May 7	Cardinals	4–3	**McFadden** (2–2)	Powell (1–2)	**League Park**	1,800	8–4	W1
14	May 8	Cardinals	3–14	Harper (3–0)	Rusie (0–1)	**League Park**	3,000	8–5	L1
15	May 9	Cardinals	9–3	**Hahn** (4–1)	Breitenstein (0–3)	**League Park**	1,800	9–5	W1
16	May 10	@ Pirates	0–3	Tannehill (2–1)	**Newton** (1–2)	Exposition Park	3,500	9–6	L1
―	May 11	@ Pirates	Postponed (wet grounds). Rescheduled to September 14.						
17	May 12	Pirates	6–1	**Hahn** (5–1)	Leever (4–1)	**League Park**	12,994	10–6	W1
18	May 13	@ Pirates	3–2	**McFadden** (3–2)	Chesbro (1–1)	Exposition Park	4,000	11–6	W2
19	May 14	@ Superbas	7–8	Hughes (2–1)	**Newton** (1–3)	Washington Park	2,500	11–7	L1
20	May 15	@ Superbas	6–1	**Phillips** (3–0)	McJames (0–2)	Washington Park	3,400	12–7	W1
21	May 16	@ Superbas	6–4	**Hahn** (6–1)	Donovan (3–2)	Washington Park	2,600	13–7	W2
22	May 17	@ Superbas	9–10	Hughes (3–1)	**Newton** (1–4)	Washington Park	1,900	13–8	L1
―	May 18	@ Beaneaters	Postponed (rain). Rescheduled to July 1.						
―	May 20	@ Beaneaters	Postponed (rain). Rescheduled to September 7.						
23	May 21	@ Beaneaters	4–1	**Phillips** (4–0)	Dinneen (3–1)	South End Grounds	2,500	14–8	W1
24	May 22	@ Beaneaters	4–3	**Hahn** (7–1)	Willis (1–4)	South End Grounds	2,000	15–8	W2
25	May 23	@ Giants	1–8	Doheny (1–1)	**Newton** (1–5)	Polo Grounds	9,150	15–9	L1
26	May 24	@ Giants	0–1	Mathewson (8–0)	**Phillips** (4–1)	Polo Grounds	9,620	15–10	L2
―	May 25	@ Giants	Postponed (rain). Rescheduled to June 27.						
―	May 27	@ Giants	Postponed (rain). Rescheduled to September 13.						
27	May 28	@ Phillies	0–1	Donahue (4–3)	**Hahn** (7–2)	Baker Bowl	1,402	15–11	L3
―	May 29	@ Phillies	Postponed (rain). Rescheduled to June 24.						
28	May 30 (1)	@ Phillies	1–2	Duggleby (3–4)	**Newton** (1–6)	Baker Bowl	4,877	15–12	L4
29	May 30 (2)	@ Phillies	4–3	**Phillips** (5–1)	White (4–3)	Baker Bowl	13,979	16–12	W1

June: 7–18 (Home 3–9, Road 4–9)

#	Date	Opponent	Score	Win	Loss	Stadium	Attendance	Record	Streak
30	June 1	@ Pirates	4–3	**Newton** (2–6)	Tannehill (4–2)	Exposition Park	5,500	17–12	W2
31	June 2	Cardinals	1–6	Harper (5–2)	**Hahn** (7–3)	**League Park**	14,494	17–13	L1
32	June 3	Superbas	5–4	**Phillips** (6–1)	Hughes (3–3)	**League Park**	2,500	18–13	W1
33	June 4	Superbas	3–7	Donovan (8–2)	**McFadden** (3–3)	**League Park**	2,800	18–14	L1
34	June 5	Superbas	1–1	—	—	**League Park**	2,100	18–14	T1
―	June 6	Giants	Postponed (rain). Rescheduled to July 10.						
35	June 7	Giants	3–2	**Newton** (3–6)	Doheny (1–2)	**League Park**	3,600	19–14	W1
36	June 8	Giants	6–4	**Hahn** (8–3)	Mathewson (9–4)	**League Park**	10,084	20–14	W2
37	June 9	Giants	13–25	Phyle (5–0)	**Phillips** (6–2)	**League Park**	17,984	20–15	L1
38	June 10	Beaneaters	5–9	Willis (3–4)	**Newton** (3–7)	**League Park**	2,000	20–16	L2
39	June 11	Beaneaters	2–3	Dinneen (4–3)	**Hahn** (8–4)	**League Park**	1,800	20–17	L3
40	June 12	Beaneaters	6–6	—	—	**League Park**	1,500	20–17	T1
41	June 13	Phillies	4–8	Duggleby (4–6)	**Newton** (3–8)	**League Park**	1,200	20–18	L1
42	June 15	Phillies	4–5	Donahue (8–3)	**Phillips** (6–3)	**League Park**	2,000	20–19	L2
43	June 16	Pirates	0–2	Tannehill (4–2)	**Hahn** (8–5)	**League Park**	6,500	20–20	L3
44	June 17	Cardinals	1–12	Sudhoff (6–2)	**Newton** (3–9)	**League Park**	1,200	20–21	L4
45	June 19	@ Superbas	6–10	McJames (3–3)	**Phillips** (6–4)	Washington Park	1,900	20–22	L5
46	June 20	@ Superbas	1–8	Donovan (11–4)	**Hahn** (8–6)	Washington Park	2,400	20–23	L6
47	June 21	@ Superbas	3–21	Kennedy (11–4)	**Parker** (0–1)	Washington Park	1,900	20–24	L7
48	June 22	@ Phillies	6–3	**Newton** (4–9)	Donahue (8–5)	Baker Bowl	4,599	21–24	W1
49	June 24 (1)	@ Phillies	0–8	Duggleby (6–6)	**Hahn** (8–7)	Baker Bowl	N/A	21–25	L1
50	June 24 (2)	@ Phillies	1–19	White (5–7)	**Phillips** (6–5)	Baker Bowl	5,048	21–26	L2
51	June 25	@ Phillies	0–3	Orth (8–5)	**Newton** (4–10)	Baker Bowl	1,495	21–27	L3
52	June 26	@ Giants	2–6	Mathewson (11–6)	**Scott** (0–1)	Polo Grounds	2,500	21–28	L4
53	June 27 (1)	@ Giants	7–5	**Hahn** (9–7)	Doheny (2–4)	Polo Grounds	N/A	22–28	W1
54	June 27 (2)	@ Giants	0–4	Taylor (5–9)	**Phillips** (6–6)	Polo Grounds	5,900	22–29	L1
55	June 28	@ Giants	10–11	Phyle (6–1)	**Newton** (4–11)	Polo Grounds	2,100	22–30	L2
56	June 29	@ Beaneaters	11–5	**Hahn** (10–7)	Dinneen (6–6)	South End Grounds	2,000	23–30	W1

July: 10–18 (Home 9–10, Road 1–8)

#	Date	Opponent	Score	Win	Loss	Stadium	Attendance	Record	Streak
57	July 1 (1)	@ Beaneaters	1–9	Nichols (5–8)	**Phillips** (6–7)	South End Grounds	N/A	23–31	L1
58	July 1 (2)	@ Beaneaters	2–4	Dinneen (7–6)	**Newton** (4–12)	South End Grounds	2,500	23–32	L2
59	July 2	@ Beaneaters	10–1	**Hahn** (11–7)	Pittinger (5–5)	South End Grounds	1,500	24–32	W1
60	July 4 (1)	Beaneaters	2–0	**Phillips** (7–7)	Willis (8–6)	**League Park**	3,000	25–32	W2
61	July 4 (2)	Beaneaters	4–6	Nichols (6–8)	**Newton** (4–13)	**League Park**	2,800	25–33	L1
62	July 5	Beaneaters	3–4	Dinneen (8–6)	**Case** (0–1)	**League Park**	1,100	25–34	L2
63	July 6	Beaneaters	4–1	**Hahn** (12–7)	Pittinger (5–6)	**League Park**	2,200	26–34	W1
64	July 7	Giants	6–5	**Phillips** (8–7)	Doheny (2–5)	**League Park**	4,830	27–34	W2
65	July 8	Giants	3–9	Mathewson (14–6)	**Scott** (0–2)	**League Park**	3,300	27–35	L1
66	July 9	Giants	5–4	**Case** (1–1)	Phyle (7–3)	**League Park**	1,800	28–35	W1
67	July 10	Giants	0–3	Taylor (7–11)	**Hahn** (12–8)	**League Park**	2,000	28–36	L1
68	July 11	Superbas	4–5	Kitson (6–9)	**Phillips** (8–8)	**League Park**	1,200	28–37	L2
69	July 12	Superbas	6–8	Donovan (15–6)	**Newton** (4–14)	**League Park**	1,500	28–38	L3
70	July 13	Superbas	8–9	Carsey (1–0)	**Guese** (0–1)	**League Park**	3,000	28–39	L4
71	July 14	Superbas	7–0	**Hahn** (13–8)	Kitson (6–10)	**League Park**	5,200	29–39	W1
72	July 15	Superbas	4–3	**Phillips** (9–8)	Donovan (15–7)	**League Park**	1,400	30–39	W2
―	July 17	Phillies	Postponed (rain). Rescheduled to October 1.						
73	July 18	Phillies	1–13	Orth (11–7)	**Case** (1–2)	**League Park**	2,800	30–40	L1
74	July 19	Phillies	6–2	**Hahn** (14–8)	White (9–9)	**League Park**	1,500	31–40	W1
75	July 20	Phillies	5–1	**Phillips** (10–8)	Donahue (12–7)	**League Park**	3,000	32–40	W2
76	July 21	@ Cardinals	2–15	Murphy (5–5)	**Guese** (0–2)	Robison Field	10,000	32–41	L1
77	July 23	@ Pirates	2–9	Chesbro (10–7)	**Hahn** (14–9)	Exposition Park	2,800	32–42	L2
78	July 24	@ Pirates	2–11	Tannehill (9–6)	**Phillips** (10–9)	Exposition Park	2,400	32–43	L3
79	July 25	@ Pirates	5–9	Poole (2–2)	**Guese** (0–3)	Exposition Park	1,700	32–44	L4
80	July 26	@ Orphans	2–5	Hughes (5–11)	**Stimmel** (0–1)	West Side Grounds	600	32–45	L5
81	July 27	@ Orphans	3–9	Taylor (10–12)	**Hahn** (14–10)	West Side Grounds	1,100	32–46	L6
―	July 28	@ Orphans	Postponed (rain). Rescheduled to August 26.						
82	July 29	Orphans	2–3	Menefee (5–9)	**Phillips** (10–10)	**League Park**	800	32–47	L7
83	July 30	Orphans	4–5	Taylor (11–12)	**Stimmel** (0–2)	**League Park**	800	32–48	L8
84	July 31	Orphans	5–4	**Hahn** (15–10)	Hughes (5–12)	**League Park**	800	33–48	W1

August: 10–12 (Home 5–6, Road 5–6)

#	Date	Opponent	Score	Win	Loss	Stadium	Attendance	Record	Streak
85	August 3	@ Pirates	7–4	**Phillips** (11–10)	Phillippe (14–9)	Exposition Park	5,500	34–48	W2
86	August 4	Pirates	3–6	Poole (3–2)	**Hahn** (15–11)	**League Park**	8,200	34–49	L1
87	August 5	Orphans	10–7	**Guese** (1–3)	Menefee (5–10)	**League Park**	1,000	35–49	W1
88	August 6	Orphans	2–6	Waddell (9–16)	**Stimmel** (0–3)	**League Park**	1,000	35–50	L1
89	August 7	Orphans	6–3	**Phillips** (12–10)	Taylor (11–13)	**League Park**	800	36–50	W1
90	August 8	Cardinals	0–2	Sudhoff (9–7)	**Hahn** (15–12)	**League Park**	1,500	36–51	L1
91	August 9	Cardinals	6–13	Murphy (7–5)	**Guese** (1–4)	**League Park**	1,200	36–52	L2
92	August 10	@ Cardinals	8–5	**Stimmel** (1–3)	Powell (15–13)	Robison Field	7,000	37–52	W1
93	August 11	@ Cardinals	2–3	Harper (20–7)	**Phillips** (12–11)	Robison Field	11,000	37–53	L1
94	August 12	@ Cardinals	5–8	Sudhoff (10–7)	**Hahn** (15–13)	Robison Field	3,000	37–54	L2
95	August 13	@ Cardinals	6–4	**Stimmel** (2–3)	Murphy (7–6)	Robison Field	2,000	38–54	W1
96	August 17	@ Pirates	0–5	Chesbro (13–8)	**Hahn** (15–14)	Exposition Park	4,900	38–55	L1
97	August 18	Pirates	5–4	**Phillips** (13–11)	Tannehill (11–8)	**League Park**	4,500	39–55	W1
98	August 19	Orphans	2–0	**Stimmel** (3–3)	Hughes (6–13)	**League Park**	1,200	40–55	W2
―	August 20	Orphans	Postponed (rain). Rescheduled to August 22.						
99	August 21	Orphans	1–9	Waddell (11–17)	**Weyhing** (0–1)	**League Park**	2,800	40–56	L1
100	August 22	Orphans	6–3	**Hahn** (16–14)	Eason (6–11)	**League Park**	1,500	41–56	W1
―	August 24	Pirates	Postponed (rain). Rescheduled to September 29.						
101	August 25	Pirates	3–6	Doheny (5–5)	**Phillips** (13–12)	**League Park**	8,436	41–57	L1
102	August 26	@ Orphans	4–3	**Hahn** (17–14)	Hughes (7–14)	West Side Grounds	9,000	42–57	W1
103	August 27	@ Orphans	2–3	Taylor (13–14)	**Suthoff** (0–1)	West Side Grounds	10,000	42–58	L1
104	August 28	@ Orphans	4–5	Waddell (13–17)	**Stimmel** (3–4)	West Side Grounds	11,000	42–59	L2
105	August 30	@ Cardinals	7–5	**Hahn** (18–14)	Powell (18–15)	Robison Field	2,000	43–59	W1
106	August 31	@ Cardinals	4–15	Murphy (8–8)	**Phillips** (13–13)	Robison Field	4,000	43–60	L1

September: 8–22 (Home 5–10, Road 3–12)

#	Date	Opponent	Score	Win	Loss	Stadium	Attendance	Record	Streak

October: 1–5 (Home 1–5, Road 0–0)

#	Date	Opponent	Score	Win	Loss	Stadium	Attendance	Record	Streak

Legend: = Win = Loss = Tie = Postponement
Bold = Reds team member

== Player stats ==
=== Batting ===
==== Starters by position ====
Note: Pos = Position; G = Games played; AB = At bats; H = Hits; Avg. = Batting average; HR = Home runs; RBI = Runs batted in

Pos	Player	G	AB	H	Avg.	HR	RBI
C	Bill Bergen	87	308	55	.179	1	17
1B	Jake Beckley	140	580	178	.307	3	79
2B	Harry Steinfeldt	105	382	95	.249	6	47
SS	George Magoon	127	460	116	.252	1	53
3B	Charlie Irwin	67	260	62	.238	0	25
OF	Sam Crawford	131	515	170	.330	16	104
OF	John Dobbs	109	435	119	.274	2	27
OF	Dick Harley	133	535	146	.273	4	27

==== Other batters ====
Note: G = Games played; AB = At bats; H = Hits; Avg. = Batting average; HR = Home runs; RBI = Runs batted in

Player	G	AB	H	Avg.	HR	RBI
Heinie Peitz	82	269	82	.305	1	24
Bill Fox	43	159	28	.176	0	7
Harry Bay	41	157	33	.210	1	3
Algie McBride	30	123	29	.236	2	18
Tommy Corcoran	31	115	24	.209	0	15
Pete O'Brien	16	54	11	.204	1	3
Jerry Hurley	9	21	1	.048	0	0
Emil Haberer	6	18	3	.167	0	1
John Heileman	5	15	2	.133	0	1
Mike Kahoe	4	13	4	.308	0	0
Charlie Krause	1	4	1	.250	0	0

=== Pitching ===
==== Starting pitchers ====
Note: G = Games pitched; IP = Innings pitched; W = Wins; L = Losses; ERA = Earned run average; SO = Strikeouts

Player	G	IP	W	L	ERA	SO
Noodles Hahn	42	375.1	22	19	2.71	239
Bill Phillips	37	281.1	14	18	4.64	109
Doc Newton	20	168.1	4	13	4.12	65
Archie Stimmel	20	153.1	4	14	4.11	55
Whitey Guese	6	44.1	1	4	6.09	11
Charlie Case	3	27.0	1	2	4.67	5
Len Swormstedt	3	26.0	2	1	1.73	13
Gus Weyhing	1	9.0	0	1	3.00	3
Doc Parker	1	8.0	0	1	15.75	0

==== Other pitchers ====
Note: G = Games pitched; IP = Innings pitched; W = Wins; L = Losses; ERA = Earned run average; SO = Strikeouts

Player	G	IP	W	L	ERA	SO
Jack Sutthoff	10	70.1	1	6	5.50	12
Barney McFadden	8	46.0	3	4	6.07	11
Amos Rusie	3	22.0	0	1	8.59	6
Dick Scott	3	21.0	0	2	5.14	7
Crese Heismann	3	13.2	0	1	5.93	6
