= 1902 Cincinnati Reds season =

1902 Cincinnati Reds
- League: National League
- Ballpark: Palace of the Fans
- City: Cincinnati
- Owners: John T. Brush, Garry Herrmann
- Managers: Bid McPhee, Frank Bancroft, Joe Kelley

The 1902 Cincinnati Reds season was a season in American baseball. The team finished with a record of 70–70, fourth in the National League, 33 1/2 games behind the Pittsburgh Pirates. In August, principal owner John T. Brush sold his interest in the Reds to a group headed by August "Garry" Herrmann.

== Regular season ==
After finishing in last place for the first time in team history with a 52–87 record in 1901, the Reds were hoping to return to respectability in 1902.

Despite the last-place finish, Cincinnati brought back manager Bid McPhee to lead the club. The team was relatively quiet during the off-season, as the only major changes were that Harry Steinfeldt returned to playing third base, while Erve Beck, who spent the 1901 season with the Cleveland Blues of the American League, took over at second base. Beck had hit .289 with six homers and 79 RBI with Cleveland.

Sam Crawford saw his production dip a bit after a breakout 1901 season, but he still batted .333 with three home runs and 78 RBI, while Jake Beckley continued his steady production, batting .330 with a team high five home runs and 69 RBI. Heinie Peitz had his best offensive season, hitting .315 with a homer and 60 RBI, while Cy Seymour hit .340 with two home runs and 37 RBI after his mid-season arrival from the Baltimore Orioles.

On the mound, Noodles Hahn was the ace of the staff once again, going 23–12 with an ERA of 1.77 in 36 starts, completing 35 of them. Bill Phillips went 16–16 with a 2.51 ERA in 33 starts, while Ed Poole, acquired by the Reds from the Pittsburgh Pirates early in the season, went 12–4 with a 2.15 ERA in 16 starts.

=== Season summary ===
Cincinnati got off to a rough start, going only 4–12 in their opening sixteen games to quickly find themselves in seventh place, 10.5 games behind the Pittsburgh Pirates. The losses continued to pile up, and after a 27–37 start to the year, the Reds fired manager Bid McPhee, and replaced him with Frank Bancroft on an interim basis. Bancroft had last managed in the major leagues with the Indianapolis Hoosiers in 1889, and he managed the Providence Grays to a World Series title in 1884.

Cincinnati also began to make numerous player changes, as John Dobbs was sent to the Chicago Orphans for cash, and Erve Beck was released by the team. The Reds signed free agent Cy Seymour, who had been released by the Orioles after hitting .268 with three home runs and 41 RBI in 72 games with them. The Reds played better under Bancroft, as they went 9–7 when he was the manager, before the team named Joe Kelley as player-manager for the remainder of the season. Kelley was acquired by the Orioles during the season, where he hit .311 with a homer and 34 RBI in 60 games. With Kelley as the manager, the Reds finished the season strongly, going 34–26 in their last 60 games, to finish the year with a 70–70 record, good enough for fourth place in the National League; however, they were 33.5 games behind the first-place Pirates.

=== Season standings ===
National League
Team	W	L	Pct.	GB	Home	Road
Pittsburgh Pirates	103	36	.741	—	56‍–‍15	47‍–‍21
Brooklyn Superbas	75	63	.543	27½	45‍–‍23	30‍–‍40
Boston Beaneaters	73	64	.533	29	42‍–‍27	31‍–‍37
Cincinnati Reds	70	70	.500	33½	35‍–‍35	35‍–‍35
Chicago Orphans	68	69	.496	34	31‍–‍38	37‍–‍31
St. Louis Cardinals	56	78	.418	44½	28‍–‍38	28‍–‍40
Philadelphia Phillies	56	81	.409	46	29‍–‍39	27‍–‍42
New York Giants	48	88	.353	53½	24‍–‍44	24‍–‍44

=== Record vs. opponents ===
1902 National League record Sources:
Team	BSN	BRO	CHC	CIN	NYG	PHI	PIT	STL
Boston	—	8–12	11–9	11–9	16–3	11–9–1	6–14–1	10–8–3
Brooklyn	12–8	—	12–8	12–8	10–10	13–6	6–14–1	10–9–2
Chicago	9–11	8–12	—	12–8–1	10–10–4	10–10	7–13	12–5–1
Cincinnati	9–11	8–12	8–12–1	—	14–6	13–7	5–15	13–7
New York	3–16	10–10	10–10–4	6–14	—	6–12	6–13–1	7–13
Philadelphia	9–11–1	6–13	10–10	7–13	12–6	—	2–18	10–10
Pittsburgh	14–6–1	14–6–1	13–7	15–5	13–6–1	18–2	—	16–4
St. Louis	8–10–3	9–10–2	5–12–1	7–13	13–7	10–10	4–16	—

=== Roster ===
1902 Cincinnati Reds
Roster
Pitchers: Clarence Currie; Bob Ewing; Martin Glendon; Noodles Hahn; Crese Heismann; Buck Hooker; Bill Phillips; Ed Poole; Archie Stimmel; Len Swormstedt; Henry Thielman; Rube Vickers	Catchers: Bill Bergen; Infielders: Erve Beck; Jake Beckley; Tommy Corcoran; George Magoon; Jack Morrissey; Heinie Peitz; Harry Steinfeldt	Outfielders: Harry Bay; Sam Crawford; John Dobbs; Mike Donlin; Dummy Hoy; Joe Kelley; Billy Maloney; Cy Seymour	Manager: Frank Bancroft; Bid McPhee; Joe Kelley

== Player stats ==
=== Batting ===
==== Starters by position ====
Note: Pos = Position; G = Games played; AB = At bats; H = Hits; Avg. = Batting average; HR = Home runs; RBI = Runs batted in

Pos	Player	G	AB	H	Avg.	HR	RBI
C	Bill Bergen	89	322	58	180	0	36
1B	Jake Beckley	129	531	175	.330	5	69
2B	Heinie Peitz	112	387	122	.315	1	60
3B	Harry Steinfeldt	129	479	133	.278	1	49
SS	Tommy Corcoran	138	538	136	.253	0	54
OF	Sam Crawford	140	555	185	.333	3	78
OF	John Dobbs	63	256	76	.297	1	16
OF	Dummy Hoy	72	279	81	.290	2	20

==== Other batters ====
Note: G = Games played; AB = At bats; H = Hits; Avg. = Batting average; HR = Home runs; RBI = Runs batted in

Player	G	AB	H	Avg.	HR	RBI
Cy Seymour	62	244	83	.340	2	37
Erve Beck	48	187	57	.305	1	20
George Magoon	45	162	44	.272	0	23
Joe Kelley	40	156	50	.321	1	12
Mike Donlin	34	143	41	.287	0	9
Billy Maloney	27	89	22	.247	1	7
Jack Morrissey	12	39	11	.282	0	3
Harry Bay	6	16	6	.375	0	1

=== Pitching ===
==== Starting pitchers ====
Note: G = Games pitched; IP = Innings pitched; W = Wins; L = Losses; ERA = Earned run average; SO = Strikeouts

Player	G	IP	W	L	ERA	SO
Noodles Hahn	36	321.0	23	12	1.77	142
Bill Phillips	33	269.0	16	16	2.51	85
Henry Thielman	25	211.0	9	15	3.24	49
Ed Poole	16	138.0	12	4	2.15	55
Bob Ewing	15	117.2	5	6	2.98	44
Archie Stimmel	4	26.0	0	4	3.46	7
Rube Vickers	3	21.0	0	3	6.00	6
Len Swormstedt	2	18.0	0	2	4.00	3
Buck Hooker	1	8.0	0	1	4.50	0
Jake Beckley	1	4.0	0	1	6.75	2
Martin Glendon	1	3.0	0	1	12.00	0

==== Other pitchers ====
Note: G = Games pitched; IP = Innings pitched; W = Wins; L = Losses; ERA = Earned run average; SO = Strikeouts

Player	G	IP	W	L	ERA	SO
Clarence Currie	10	65.1	3	4	3.72	20
Crese Heismann	5	33.0	2	1	2.45	15

==== Relief pitchers ====
Note: G = Games pitched; W = Wins; L = Losses; SV = Saves; ERA = Earned run average; SO = Strikeouts

Player	G	W	L	SV	ERA	SO
Cy Seymour	1	0	0	0	9.00	2
Mike Donlin	1	0	0	0	0.00	0
