= List of Cincinnati Reds Opening Day starting pitchers =

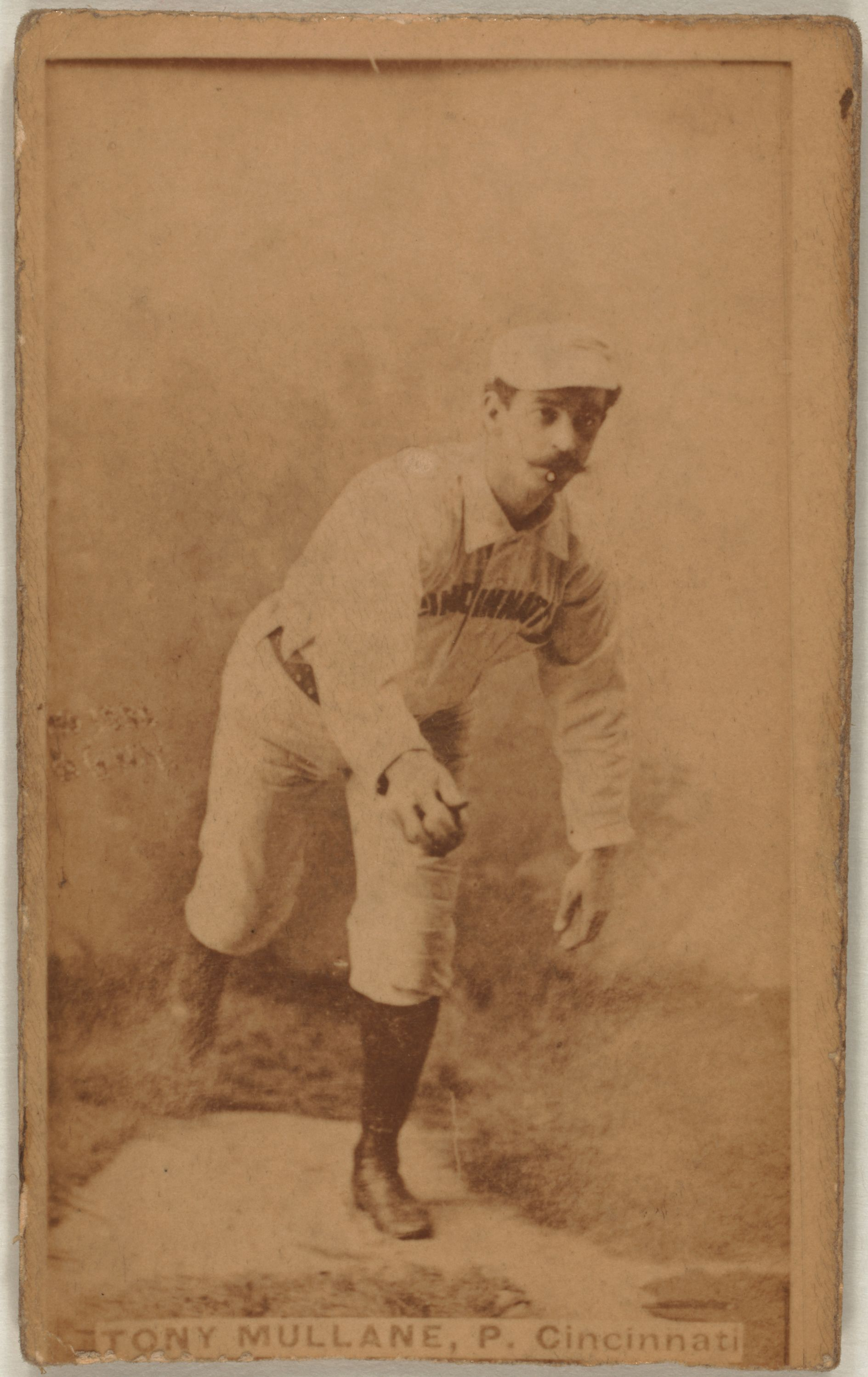
Tony Mullane made five Opening Day starts for the Reds during the 1800s.

The Cincinnati Reds are a Major League Baseball franchise based in Cincinnati who play in the National League's Central Division. In their history, the franchise also played under the names Cincinnati Red Stockings and Cincinnati Redlegs. They played in the American Association from 1882 through 1889, and have played in the National League since 1890. The first game of the new baseball season for a team is played on Opening Day, and being named the Opening Day starter is an honor that is often given to the player who is expected to lead the pitching staff that season, though there are various strategic reasons why a team's best pitcher might not start on Opening Day. The Reds have used 76 Opening Day starting pitchers since they began play as a Major League team in 1882.

The Reds have played in several different home ball parks. They played two seasons in their first home ball park, Bank Street Grounds, and had one win and one loss in Opening Day games there. The team had a record of six wins and ten losses in Opening Day games at League Park, and a record of three wins and seven losses in Opening Day games at the Palace of the Fans. The Reds played in Crosley Field from 1912 through the middle of the 1970 season, and had a record of 27 wins and 31 losses in Opening Day games there. They had an Opening Day record of 19 wins, 11 losses and 1 tie from 1971 through 2002 at Riverfront Stadium, and they have a record of three wins and six losses in Opening Day games at their current home ball park, the Great American Ball Park. That gives the Reds an overall Opening Day record of 59 wins, 66 losses and one tie at home. They have a record of three wins and one loss in Opening Day games on the road.

Mario Soto holds the Reds' record for most Opening Day starts, with six. Tony Mullane, Pete Donohue and Aaron Harang have each made five Opening Day starts for the Reds. José Rijo and Johnny Cueto have each made four Opening Day starts for Cincinnati, while Ewell Blackwell, Tom Browning, Paul Derringer, Art Fromme, Si Johnson, Gary Nolan, Jim O'Toole, Tom Seaver, Bucky Walters and Will White each made three such starts for the Reds. Harang was the Reds' Opening Day starting pitcher every season from 2006 to 2010. Among the Reds' Opening Day starting pitchers, Seaver and Eppa Rixey have been elected to the Baseball Hall of Fame.

The Reds have won the World Series championship five times, in 1919, 1940, 1975, 1976 and 1990. Dutch Ruether was the Reds' Opening Day starting pitcher in 1919, Derringer in 1940, Don Gullett in 1975, Nolan in 1976 and Browning in 1990. The Reds won all five Opening Day games in seasons in which they won the World Series. In addition, prior to the existence of the modern World Series, the Reds won the American Association championship in 1882. White was their Opening Day starting pitcher that season, the franchise's first. Jack Billingham started one of the most famous Opening Day games in Reds history on April 4, 1974, against the Atlanta Braves. In that game, Billingham surrendered Hank Aaron's 714th career home run, which tied Babe Ruth's all time home run record.

== Key ==
Season	Each year is linked to an article about that particular Reds season.
W	Win
L	Loss
T	Tie game
ND (W)	No decision by starting pitcher; Reds won game
ND (L)	No decision by starting pitcher; Reds lost game
(W)	Reds won game; no information on starting pitcher's decision
(L)	Reds lost game; no information on starting pitcher's decision
Final score	Game score with Reds runs listed first
Location	Stadium in italics for home game
(#)	Number of appearances as Opening Day starter with the Reds
*	Advanced to the post-season
***	American Association Champions
**	National League Champions
^{⁂}	World Series Champions

== Pitchers ==
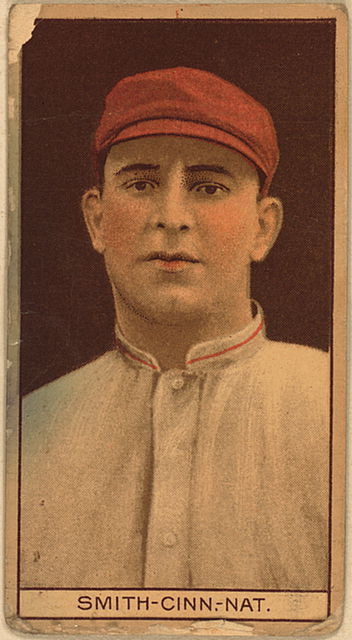
Frank Smith was the Reds' Opening Day starting pitcher in 1912.

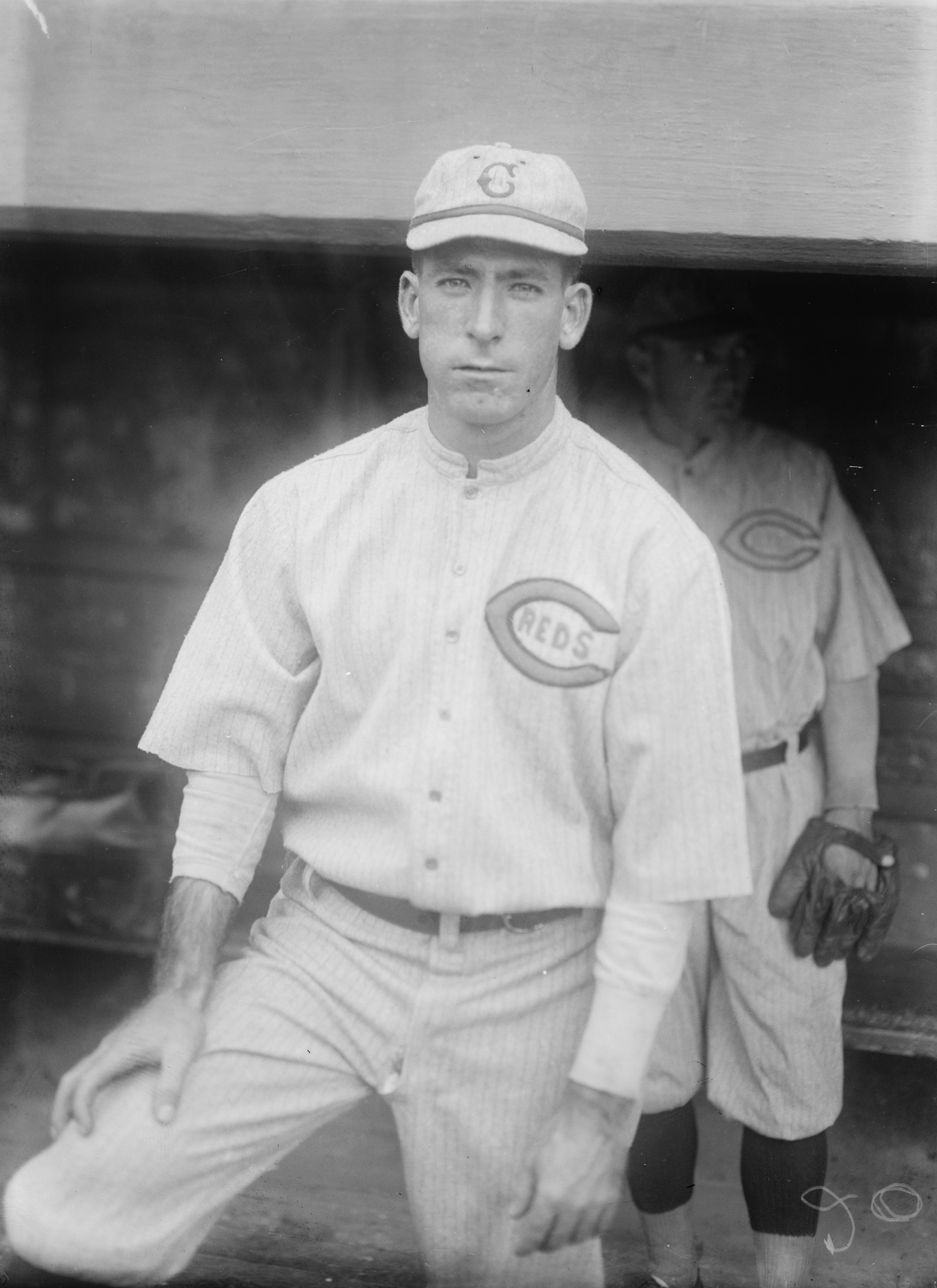
Dolf Luque made two Opening Day starts for the Reds.

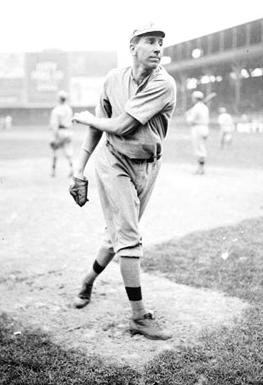
Hall of Famer Eppa Rixey was the Reds' Opening Day starting pitcher in 1922.

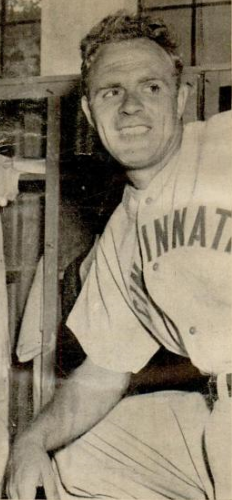
Johnny Vander Meer made two Opening Day starts for the Reds.

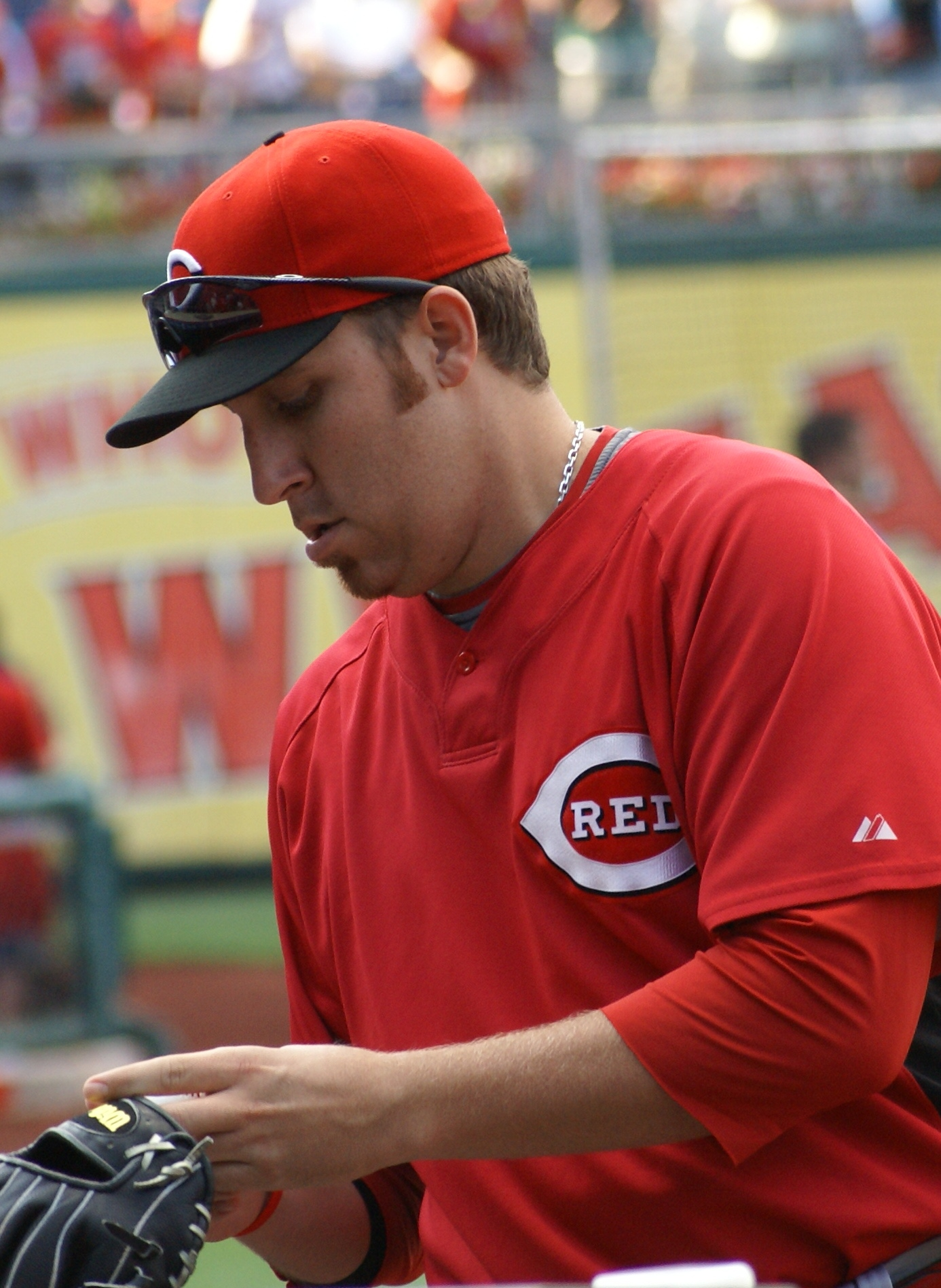
Aaron Harang was the Reds' Opening Day starting pitcher between 2006 and 2010.

Season	Pitcher	Decision	Final score	Opponent	Location	Ref(s)
1882***	Will White	(L)	9–10	Pittsburgh Pirates	Bank Street Grounds	
1883	Will White (2)	(W)	6–5	St. Louis Browns	Bank Street Grounds	
1884	Will White (3)	(L)	9–10	Columbus Buckeyes	League Park	
1885	Gus Shallix	(W)	4–1	Louisville Colonels	Eclipse Park	
1886	Larry McKeon	(L)	1–5	Louisville Colonels	League Park	
1887	Tony Mullane	(W)	16–6	Cleveland Spiders	League Park	
1888	Tony Mullane (2)	(W)	10–3	Kansas City Cowboys	Association Park	
1889	Tony Mullane (3)	(L)	1–5	St. Louis Browns	League Park	
1890	Jesse Duryea	(L)	4–5	Chicago Cubs	League Park	
1891	Tony Mullane (4)	(L)	3–6	Cleveland Spiders	League Park	
1892	Tony Mullane (5)	(L)	5–7	Pittsburgh Pirates	League Park	
1893	Bumpus Jones	(W)	10–1	Chicago Cubs	League Park	
1894	Tom Parrott	(W)	10–6	Chicago Cubs	League Park	
1895	Frank Dwyer	(W)	10–8	Cleveland Spiders	League Park	
1896	Billy Rhines	(L)	1–9	Pittsburgh Pirates	League Park	
1897	Red Ehret	(W)	8–7	Chicago Cubs	League Park	
1898	Ted Breitenstein	(W)	3–2	Cleveland Spiders	League Park	
1899	Pink Hawley	(L)	2–5	Pittsburgh Pirates	League Park	
1900	Bill Phillips	(L)	10–13	Chicago Cubs	League Park	
1901	Noodles Hahn	(L)	2–4	Pittsburgh Pirates	League Park	
1902	Len Swormstedt	(L)	1–6	Chicago Cubs	Palace of the Fans	
1903	Jack Harper	(L)	1–7	Pittsburgh Pirates	Palace of the Fans	
1904	Jack Sutthoff	(W)	3–2	Chicago Cubs	Palace of the Fans	
1905	Jack Harper (2)	(L)	4–9	Pittsburgh Pirates	Palace of the Fans	
1906	Orval Overall	(L)	2–7	Chicago Cubs	Palace of the Fans	
1907	Bob Ewing	(W)	4–3	Pittsburgh Pirates	Palace of the Fans	
1908	Bob Ewing (2)	(L)	5–6	Chicago Cubs	Palace of the Fans	
1909	Art Fromme	(L)	0–3	Pittsburgh Pirates	Palace of the Fans	
1910	Fred Beebe	(W)	1–0	Chicago Cubs	Palace of the Fans	
1911	Art Fromme (2)	L	0–14	Pittsburgh Pirates	Palace of the Fans	
1912	Frank Smith	(W)	10–6	Chicago Cubs	Crosley Field	
1913	Art Fromme (3)	(L)	2–9	Pittsburgh Pirates	Crosley Field	
1914	Rube Benton	(W)	10–1	Chicago Cubs	Crosley Field	
1915	Red Ames	(L)	2–9	Pittsburgh Pirates	Crosley Field	
1916	Fred Toney	(L)	1–7	Chicago Cubs	Crosley Field	
1917	Pete Schneider	(W)	3–1	St. Louis Cardinals	Crosley Field	
1918	Pete Schneider (2)	(W)	2–0	Pittsburgh Pirates	Crosley Field	
1919^{⁂}	Dutch Ruether	(W)	6–2	St. Louis Cardinals	Crosley Field	
1920	Dutch Ruether (2)	W	7–3	Chicago Cubs	Crosley Field	
1921	Dolf Luque	W	5–3	Pittsburgh Pirates	Crosley Field	
1922	Eppa Rixey	L	3–7	Chicago Cubs	Crosley Field	
1923	Pete Donohue	W	3–2	St. Louis Cardinals	Crosley Field	
1924	Pete Donohue (2)	ND (W)	6–5	Pittsburgh Pirates	Crosley Field	
1925	Pete Donohue (3)	W	4–0	St. Louis Cardinals	Crosley Field	
1926	Pete Donohue (4)	ND (W)	7–6	Chicago Cubs	Crosley Field	
1927	Pete Donohue (5)	L	1–2	Pittsburgh Pirates	Crosley Field	
1928	Dolf Luque (2)	W	5–1	Chicago Cubs	Crosley Field	
1929	Red Lucas	L	2–5	St. Louis Cardinals	Crosley Field	
1930	Red Lucas (2)	(L)	6–7	Pittsburgh Pirates	Crosley Field	
1931	Larry Benton	(L)	3–7	St. Louis Cardinals	Crosley Field	
1932	Si Johnson	ND (W)	5–4	Chicago Cubs	Crosley Field	
1933	Si Johnson (2)	(L)	1–4	Pittsburgh Pirates	Crosley Field	
1934	Si Johnson (3)	(L)	0–6	Chicago Cubs	Crosley Field	
1935	Tony Freitas	(L)	6–12	Pittsburgh Pirates	Crosley Field	
1936	Paul Derringer	(L)	6–8	Pittsburgh Pirates	Crosley Field	
1937	Peaches Davis	(L)	0–2	St. Louis Cardinals	Crosley Field	
1938	Gene Schott	(L)	7–8	Chicago Cubs	Crosley Field	
1939**	Johnny Vander Meer	(L)	5–7	Pittsburgh Pirates	Crosley Field	
1940^{⁂}	Paul Derringer (2)	W	2–1	Chicago Cubs	Crosley Field	
1941	Paul Derringer (3)	(L)	3–7	St. Louis Cardinals	Crosley Field	
1942	Bucky Walters	(L)	2–4	Pittsburgh Pirates	Crosley Field	
1943	Johnny Vander Meer (2)	W	1–0	St. Louis Cardinals	Crosley Field	
1944	Bucky Walters (2)	(L)	0–3	Chicago Cubs	Crosley Field	
1945	Bucky Walters (3)	ND (W)	7–6	Pittsburgh Pirates	Crosley Field	
1946	Joe Beggs	(L)	3–4	Chicago Cubs	Crosley Field	
1947	Ewell Blackwell	W	3–1	St. Louis Cardinals	Crosley Field	
1948	Ewell Blackwell (2)	W	4–1	Pittsburgh Pirates	Crosley Field	
1949	Ken Raffensberger	W	3–1	St. Louis Cardinals	Crosley Field	
1950	Ken Raffensberger (2)	(L)	6–9	Chicago Cubs	Crosley Field	
1951	Ewell Blackwell (3)	(L)	3–4	Pittsburgh Pirates	Crosley Field	
1952	Herm Wehmeier	(L)	5–6	Chicago Cubs	Crosley Field	
1953	Bud Podbielan	L	0–2	Milwaukee Braves	Crosley Field	
1954	Bud Podbielan (2)	ND (W)	9–8	Milwaukee Braves	Crosley Field	
1955	Art Fowler	L	5–7	Chicago Cubs	Crosley Field	
1956	Joe Nuxhall	L	2–4	St. Louis Cardinals	Crosley Field	
1957	Johnny Klippstein	L	4–13	St. Louis Cardinals	Crosley Field	
1958	Brooks Lawrence	ND (L)	4–5	Philadelphia Phillies	Crosley Field	
1959	Bob Purkey	W	4–1	Pittsburgh Pirates	Crosley Field	
1960	Jim Brosnan	ND (W)	9–4	Philadelphia Phillies	Crosley Field	
1961**	Jim O'Toole	W	7–1	Chicago Cubs	Crosley Field	
1962	Joey Jay	L	4–12	Philadelphia Phillies	Crosley Field	
1963	Jim O'Toole (2)	W	5–2	Pittsburgh Pirates	Crosley Field	
1964	Jim Maloney	L	3–6	Houston Colt .45s	Crosley Field	
1965	Jim O'Toole (3)	L	2–4	Milwaukee Braves	Crosley Field	
1966	Sammy Ellis	ND (L)	3–4	Philadelphia Phillies	Shibe Park	
1967	Jim Maloney (2)	W	6–1	Los Angeles Dodgers	Crosley Field	
1968	Milt Pappas	W	9–4	Chicago Cubs	Crosley Field	
1969	Gary Nolan	L	2–3	Los Angeles Dodgers	Crosley Field	
1970**	Jim Merritt	W	5–1	Montreal Expos	Crosley Field	
1971	Gary Nolan (2)	ND (L)	4–7	Atlanta Braves	Riverfront Stadium	
1972**	Jack Billingham	L	1–3	Los Angeles Dodgers	Riverfront Stadium	
1973*	Don Gullett	L	1–4	San Francisco Giants	Riverfront Stadium	
1974	Jack Billingham (2)	ND (W)	7–6	Atlanta Braves	Riverfront Stadium	
1975^{⁂}	Don Gullett (2)	ND (W)	2–1	Los Angeles Dodgers	Riverfront Stadium	
1976^{⁂}	Gary Nolan (3)	W	11–5	Houston Astros	Riverfront Stadium	
1977	Woodie Fryman	W	5–2	San Diego Padres	Riverfront Stadium	
1978	Tom Seaver	ND (W)	11–9	Houston Astros	Riverfront Stadium	
1979*	Tom Seaver (2)	L	5–11	San Francisco Giants	Riverfront Stadium	
1980	Frank Pastore	W	9–0	Atlanta Braves	Riverfront Stadium	
1981	Tom Seaver (3)	ND (W)	3–2	Philadelphia Phillies	Riverfront Stadium	
1982	Mario Soto	L	2–3	Chicago Cubs	Riverfront Stadium	
1983	Mario Soto (2)	W	5–4	Atlanta Braves	Riverfront Stadium	
1984	Mario Soto (3)	W	8–1	New York Mets	Riverfront Stadium	
1985	Mario Soto (4)	W	4–1	Montreal Expos	Riverfront Stadium	
1986	Mario Soto (5)	W	7–4	Philadelphia Phillies	Riverfront Stadium	
1987	Tom Browning	ND (W)	11–5	Montreal Expos	Riverfront Stadium	
1988	Mario Soto (6)	ND (W)	5–4	St. Louis Cardinals	Riverfront Stadium	
1989	Danny Jackson	W	6–4	Los Angeles Dodgers	Riverfront Stadium	
1990^{⁂}	Tom Browning (2)	ND (W)	8–4	Houston Astros	Astrodome	
1991	Tom Browning (3)	W	6–2	Houston Astros	Riverfront Stadium	
1992	José Rijo	L	3–4	San Diego Padres	Riverfront Stadium	
1993	José Rijo (2)	W	2–1	Montreal Expos	Riverfront Stadium	
1994	José Rijo (3)	L	4–6	St. Louis Cardinals	Riverfront Stadium	
1995*	José Rijo (4)	L	1–7	Chicago Cubs	Riverfront Stadium	
1996	Pete Schourek	W	4–1	Montreal Expos	Cinergy Field	
1997	John Smiley	W	11–4	Colorado Rockies	Cinergy Field	
1998	Mike Remlinger	L	2–10	San Diego Padres	Cinergy Field	
1999	Brett Tomko	ND (L)	8–11	San Francisco Giants	Cinergy Field	
2000	Pete Harnisch	T	3–3	Milwaukee Brewers	Cinergy Field	
2001	Pete Harnisch (2)	ND (L)	4–10	Atlanta Braves	Cinergy Field	
2002	Joey Hamilton	ND (W)	5–4	Chicago Cubs	Cinergy Field	
2003	Jimmy Haynes	L	1–10	Pittsburgh Pirates	Great American Ball Park	
2004	Cory Lidle	L	4–7	Chicago Cubs	Great American Ball Park	
2005	Paul Wilson	ND (W)	7–6	New York Mets	Great American Ball Park	
2006	Aaron Harang	L	7–16	Chicago Cubs	Great American Ball Park	
2007	Aaron Harang (2)	W	5–1	Chicago Cubs	Great American Ball Park	
2008	Aaron Harang (3)	L	2–4	Arizona Diamondbacks	Great American Ball Park	
2009	Aaron Harang (4)	L	1–2	New York Mets	Great American Ball Park	
2010*	Aaron Harang (5)	L	6–11	St. Louis Cardinals	Great American Ball Park	
2011	Edinson Volquez	ND (W)	7–6	Milwaukee Brewers	Great American Ball Park	
2012*	Johnny Cueto	W	4–0	Miami Marlins	Great American Ball Park	
2013*	Johnny Cueto (2)	ND (L)	1–3	Los Angeles Angels	Great American Ball Park	
2014	Johnny Cueto (3)	L	0–1	St. Louis Cardinals	Great American Ball Park	
2015	Johnny Cueto (4)	ND (W)	5–2	Pittsburgh Pirates	Great American Ball Park	
2016	Raisel Iglesias	ND (W)	6–2	Philadelphia Phillies	Great American Ball Park	
2017	Scott Feldman	L	3–4	Philadelphia Phillies	Great American Ball Park	
2018	Homer Bailey	L	0–2	Washington Nationals	Great American Ball Park	
2019	Luis Castillo	ND (W)	5–3	Pittsburgh Pirates	Great American Ball Park	
2020*	Sonny Gray	W	7–1	Detroit Tigers	Great American Ball Park	
2021	Luis Castillo (2)	L	6–11	St. Louis Cardinals	Great American Ball Park	
2022	Tyler Mahle	W	6–3	Atlanta Braves	Truist Park	
2023	Hunter Greene	ND (L)	4–5	Pittsburgh Pirates	Great American Ball Park	
2024	Frankie Montas	W	8–2	Washington Nationals	Great American Ball Park	
2025	Hunter Greene (2)	ND (L)	4–6	San Francisco Giants	Great American Ball Park	
2026	Andrew Abbott	ND (L)	0–3	Boston Red Sox	Great American Ball Park	
