= Heileman =

Heileman is a surname. Notable people with the name include:

- Gottlieb Heileman (1824–1878), the founder of the G. Heileman Brewing Company in La Crosse, Wisconsin, US
- John Heileman (1872–1940), American professional baseball infielder

== See also ==
- G. Heileman Brewing Company of La Crosse, Wisconsin, US, a brewer that operated from 1858 to 1996
