= Jerry Hurley =

Jerry Hurley may refer to:

- Jerry Hurley (1900s catcher) (1875–1919), catcher for the Cincinnati Reds and the Brooklyn Superbas
- Jerry Hurley (1890s catcher) (1863–1950), catcher for the Boston Beaneaters, Pittsburgh Burghers and Cincinnati Kelly's Killers
