= Charlie Krause =

American baseball player (1873–1948)

- Second baseman
- Born: October 2, 1873; Detroit, Michigan, U.S.
- Died: March 30, 1948 (aged 75); Eloise, Michigan, U.S.
- Batted: Unknown Threw: Right

MLB debut
- July 27, 1901, for the Cincinnati Reds

Last MLB appearance
- July 27, 1901, for the Cincinnati Reds

MLB statistics
- Batting average: .250
- Home runs: 0
- Runs batted in: 0
- Stats at Baseball Reference

Teams
- Cincinnati Reds (1901)

Charles Fredrick Krause (October 2, 1873 – March 30, 1948) was an American Major League Baseball second baseman who played for the 1901 Cincinnati Reds. Krause played in just one major league game, playing second base and going 1-4 with a single and a pair of strikeouts in the Reds 9-3 loss to the Chicago Orphans on July 27, 1901.
