= Whitey Guese =

American baseball player (1872–1951)

- Pitcher
- Born: January 24, 1872; New Bremen, Ohio, U.S.
- Died: April 8, 1951 (aged 79); Wapakoneta, Ohio, U.S.
- Batted: Right Threw: Right

MLB debut
- July 13, 1901, for the Cincinnati Reds

Last MLB appearance
- August 9, 1901, for the Cincinnati Reds

MLB statistics
- Win–loss record: 1–4
- Earned run average: 6.09
- Strikeouts: 11
- Stats at Baseball Reference

Teams
- Cincinnati Reds (1901)

Theodore Guese (January 24, 1872 – April 8, 1951) was an American Major League Baseball pitcher. He played professionally from 1898 to 1910, and pitched in six games for the 1901 Cincinnati Reds.
