= Jack Taylor (1890s pitcher) =

American baseball player (1873–1900)

- Pitcher
- Born: May 23, 1873; Sandy Hill, Maryland, U.S.
- Died: February 7, 1900 (aged 26); Staten Island, New York, U.S.
- Batted: Right Threw: Right

MLB debut
- September 16, 1891, for the New York Giants

Last MLB appearance
- September 12, 1899, for the Cincinnati Reds

MLB statistics
- Win–loss record: 120–117
- Earned run average: 4.23
- Strikeouts: 528
- Stats at Baseball Reference

Teams
- New York Giants (1891); Philadelphia Phillies (1892–1897); St. Louis Browns (1898); Cincinnati Reds (1899)

John Besson "Brewery Jack" Taylor (May 23, 1873 – February 7, 1900) was an American professional baseball player in the National League from 1891 to 1899.

== Career ==
Taylor is often confused with John W. "Jack" Taylor, who also played in the NL during an overlapping period. His real name has also been erroneously published as John Budd Taylor in many sources, perhaps confused with the Minor League pitcher Jack "Bud" Taylor of similar period. John Besson Taylor was born in Sandy Hill, Maryland and moved to Staten Island, New York as a young child, where he played with future Major League contemporaries Jack Cronin, Jack Sharrott, George Sharrott, and Tuck Turner.

"Brewery Jack" was a right-handed pitcher with a career record and 120 wins and 117 losses. His nine-season career consisted of (in chronological order) one game for the 1891 New York Giants, six seasons with the Philadelphia Phillies, one with the St. Louis Browns, and a final one with the Cincinnati Reds. While an ace pitcher, Taylor was known for arguing with umpire calls and (as his nickname implies) for his propensity for drinking. Taylor was still considered active in the National League during planning for the 1900 season, but died of Bright's disease in February of that year. He is buried near his mother at Fairview Cemetery in the Castleton Corners neighborhood of Staten Island.

== Legacy ==
Taylor was inducted into the Staten Island Sports Hall of Fame in 2002. He is also enshrined in 2012 into the Eastern Shore Baseball Hall of Fame in Salisbury, Maryland.

== See also ==
- List of baseball players who died during their careers
- List of Major League Baseball career hit batsmen leaders
- List of people from Staten Island § Baseball
- Jack Taylor (1900s pitcher)
