= Harry Steinfeldt =

American baseball player (1875–1914)

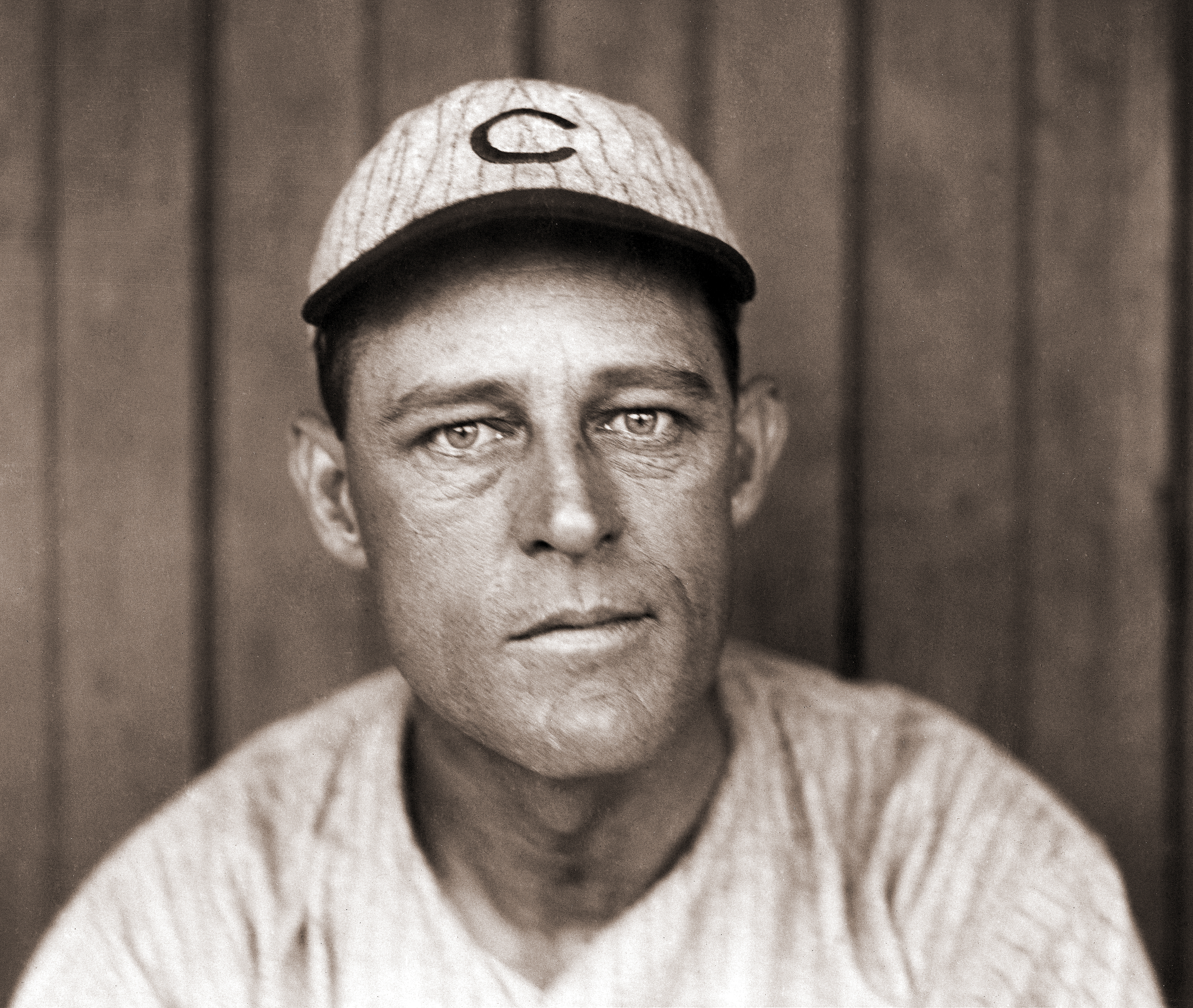
- Third baseman
- Born: September 29, 1875; St. Louis, Missouri, U.S.
- Died: August 17, 1914 (aged 38); Bellevue, Kentucky, U.S.
- Batted: Right Threw: Right

MLB debut
- April 22, 1898, for the Cincinnati Reds

Last MLB appearance
- July 1, 1911, for the Boston Rustlers

MLB statistics
- Batting average: .267
- Home runs: 27
- Runs batted in: 762
- Stats at Baseball Reference

Teams
- Cincinnati Reds (1898–1905); Chicago Cubs (1906–1910); Boston Rustlers (1911)

Career highlights and awards
- 2× World Series champion (1907, 1908); NL RBI leader (1906)

Harry M. Steinfeldt (September 29, 1875 – August 17, 1914) was an American professional baseball player. A third baseman, Steinfeldt played in Major League Baseball for the Cincinnati Reds, Chicago Cubs, and Boston Rustlers. He batted and threw right-handed.

Steinfeldt was the starting third baseman for the Cubs in the final game of the 1908 World Series, the team's last championship until their victory in 2016. He was the fourth infielder on a team that gained fame for a double-play combination of "Tinker to Evers to Chance."

== Early life ==
Steinfeldt was born in St. Louis, Missouri, on September 29, 1875, to German immigrants. His family moved to Fort Worth, Texas, when he was five years old. He initially pursued a theatrical career.

== Career ==
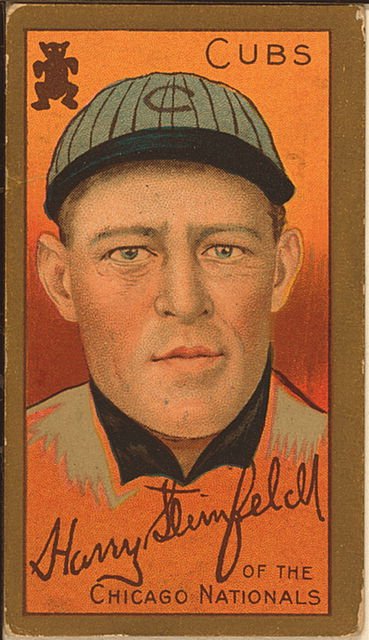
Harry Steinfeldt's 1911 baseball card

While touring Texas in a minstrel show, Steinfeldt played baseball in a town where his show was performing. His success at baseball led him to sign his first professional contract. He debuted in minor league baseball with the Houston Magnolias/Mudcats of the Class B Texas-Southern League in 1895. The next year, he played for the Galveston Sandcrabs and Fort Worth Panthers of the Class C Texas Association. In 1897, Steinfeldt played for the Detroit Tigers of the Class A Western League.

In October 1897, the Cincinnati Reds of the National League (NL) purchased Steinfeldt from Detroit. Debuting in the major leagues for the Reds in 1898, he filled in for Bid McPhee, Tommy Corcoran, and Charlie Irwin as a utility infielder. When the Reds released Irwin during the 1901 season, Steinfeldt became the Reds' starting third baseman. He led the NL in doubles in 1903 with 32.

On October 24, 1905, the Reds traded Steinfeldt, with Jimmy Sebring, to the Chicago Cubs for Jake Weimer. He led the NL in hits in 1906 with 176 and tied with Jim Nealon for most runs batted in (RBIs) with 83. His .327 batting average finished second, behind Honus Wagner (.339).

Steinfeldt set a major league record with three sacrifice flies in a game in 1909. Ernie Banks tied the record in 1961.

Steinfeldt is the only member of the Cubs' infield, which also included Joe Tinker, Johnny Evers, and Frank Chance, who was left out of Franklin Pierce Adams' famous poem "Baseball's Sad Lexicon" (the famous trio played together for ten years, starting in 1902, while Steinfeldt played with them for five years).

On April 5, 1911, the St. Paul Saints of the American Association purchased Steinfeldt from the Cubs. On May 25, 1911, St. Paul traded Steinfeldt to the Boston Rustlers for Art Butler and Josh Clarke. Steinfeldt fell ill in July 1911, leaving the team. It was later identified as a nervous breakdown. The Rustlers released Steinfeldt after the season.

In 1912, Steinfeldt returned to minor league baseball. He managed the Cincinnati Pippins of the United States Baseball League, but the league folded in midseason. He also played for the Louisville Colonels of the American Association, but was released in May. In June, he became the manager of the Meriden Metropolitans of the Cotton States League.

In 1647 games over 14 major league seasons, Steinfeldt posted a .267 batting average (1578-for-5900) with 759 runs, 284 doubles, 90 triples, 27 home runs, 762 RBI, 202 stolen bases, 471 bases on balls, .330 on-base percentage and .360 slugging percentage. He finished his career with an overall .927 fielding percentage. In 21 World Series games, he hit .260 (19-for-73) with 7 runs, 3 doubles, 1 triple, 8 RBI, 2 stolen bases and 4 walks.

== Death ==
Steinfeldt died in Bellevue, Kentucky in 1914 after a long illness, at the age of 38. He is interred at Spring Grove Cemetery in Cincinnati. The death certificate indicates that he died of a cerebral hemorrhage.

== See also ==
- List of Major League Baseball annual runs batted in leaders
- List of Major League Baseball annual doubles leaders
