= Barney McFadden =

American baseball player (1877–1924)

- Pitcher
- Born: March 20, 1877; Eckley, Pennsylvania, U.S.
- Died: April 28, 1924 (aged 47); Mauch Chunk, Pennsylvania, U.S.
- Batted: Right Threw: Right

MLB debut
- April 24, 1901, for the Cincinnati Reds

Last MLB appearance
- September 16, 1902, for the Philadelphia Phillies

MLB statistics
- Win–loss record: 3–5
- Earned run average: 6.38
- Strikeouts: 14
- Stats at Baseball Reference

Teams
- Cincinnati Reds (1901); Philadelphia Phillies (1902)

Bernard Joseph McFadden (March 20, 1877 – April 28, 1924) was an American Major League Baseball pitcher for the 1901 Cincinnati Reds and 1902 Philadelphia Phillies. He went to Villanova University.
