= Erve Beck =

American baseball player (1878–1916)

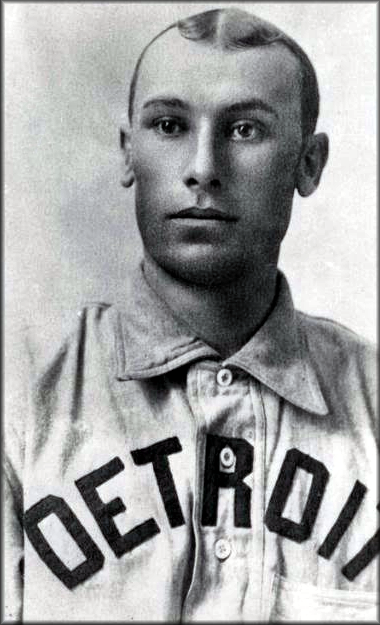
- Second baseman
- Born: July 19, 1878; Toledo, Ohio, U.S.
- Died: December 23, 1916 (aged 38); Toledo, Ohio, U.S.
- Batted: Right Threw: Right

MLB debut
- September 19, 1899, for the Brooklyn Superbas

Last MLB appearance
- September 27, 1902, for the Detroit Tigers

MLB statistics
- Batting average: .291
- Home runs: 9
- Runs batted in: 123
- Stats at Baseball Reference

Teams
- Brooklyn Superbas (1899); Cleveland Blues (1901); Cincinnati Reds (1902); Detroit Tigers (1902)

Ervin Thomas Beck (July 19, 1878 – December 23, 1916), nicknamed "Dutch", was an American second baseman. He played three seasons in Major League Baseball (MLB) from 1899 to 1902 for the Brooklyn Superbas, Cleveland Blues, Cincinnati Reds, and Detroit Tigers.

== Career ==
Ervin Thomas Beck was born on July 19, 1878, in Toledo, Ohio. He made his first professional baseball appearance at the age of 16, when he signed with the Adrian Reformers of the Michigan State League. From 1896 into the 1899 minor league baseball seasons, he played for the Toledo Mud Hens of the Interstate League, hitting 11 home runs and a .298 batting average in 1898. During his time with the Mud Hens, he was considered to be one of the top players at his position in the Interstate League. In August 1897, the Pittsburgh Pirates of the National League (NL), offered Toledo $1,500 for the rights for Beck as well as their first baseman, Bade Meyers.

In August 1899, Beck was sold by the Mud Hens to the Brooklyn Superbas of the National League, and made his major league debut on September 19. Superbas manager Ted Sullivan initially offered Toledo $200 for Beck's rights, but eventually agreed to $1000. In total, Beck played in eight games for the Superbas, six as a second baseman and two as a shortstop, and collected just four hits in 24 at bats for a .167 batting average.

For the 1900 season, he returned to the Mud Hens and played a full season, achieving career-high totals in every major hitting category, highlighted by his .360 batting average and 71 doubles. Following the season, his rights were retained by Cincinnati of the NL but he instead chose to play for the Cleveland Blues of the newly-major American League. On April 25, 1901, Beck hit the first major league home run in American League history.

On November 27, 1901, it was reported that Beck had signed with the Cincinnati Reds of the NL before the 1902 season; a one-year contract for $3,000 to play second base. After his strong performance in 1901, the move was made to strengthen the Reds offense among their infielders.

In 1904, Beck played for the Portland Browns of the Pacific Coast League. In 208 games for the Browns, he collected 217 hits and had a .273 batting average. After the season, he was rumored to be a part of a trade with the Los Angeles Angels, but it never materialized. He did change teams during the off-season, signing a contract with the New Orleans Pelicans of the Southern Association.
