= Charlie Case (baseball) =

American baseball player (1879–1964)

- Pitcher
- Born: September 7, 1879; Smith's Landing, Ohio, U.S.
- Died: April 16, 1964 (aged 84); Batavia, Ohio, U.S.
- Batted: Right Threw: Right

MLB debut
- July 5, 1901, for the Cincinnati Reds

Last MLB appearance
- April 29, 1906, for the Pittsburgh Pirates

MLB statistics
- Win–loss record: 23–19
- Earned run average: 2.93
- Strikeouts: 114
- Stats at Baseball Reference

Teams
- Cincinnati Reds (1901); Pittsburgh Pirates (1904–1906)

Charles Emmett Case (September 7, 1879 – April 16, 1964) was an American Major League Baseball (MLB) pitcher during four seasons from 1901 to 1906. On August 31, 1909, Case, pitching for the Southern Association's Nashville Vols, pitched a no-hitter against the New Orleans Pelicans at Pelican Park in New Orleans.
