= Martin Glendon =

American baseball player (1877–1950)

- Pitcher
- Born: February 8, 1877; Milwaukee, Wisconsin, U.S.
- Died: November 6, 1950 (aged 73); Chicago, Illinois, U.S.
- Batted: Right Threw: Right

MLB debut
- April 18, 1902, for the Cincinnati Reds

Last MLB appearance
- September 25, 1903, for the Cleveland Naps

MLB statistics
- Win–loss record: 1–3
- Earned run average: 2.05
- Strikeouts: 9
- Stats at Baseball Reference

Teams
- Cincinnati Reds (1902); Cleveland Naps (1903)

Martin J. Glendon (February 8, 1877 – November 6, 1950) was an American pitcher in Major League Baseball for the Cincinnati Reds and Cleveland Naps. He stood at 6 ft 5 in (1.96 m) and weighed 165 lbs.

== Career ==
Glendon was born in Milwaukee, Wisconsin. He started his professional baseball career in 1898 with the Texas League's Galveston Sandcrabs and then moved first to the Western Association and then to the Pacific Northwest League. In 1901, he had his breakout season, going 21–15 on the mound.

Glendon started 1902 with the National League's Reds and was "full of sassafras, tea and ginger." He made his major league debut on April 18. In the third inning, he gave up four hits, made a throwing error, and allowed five runs before being taken out of the game. That was the last time Glendon played for Cincinnati. He left the team soon afterwards and jumped his contract to play for San Francisco of the California League.

Glendon won 23 games for San Francisco that year, which was the second-most on the pitching staff and a career-high for him. In May of the following season, he attempted to assault an umpire and was subsequently suspended for 30 days. He went 9–9 on the west coast and then had his second major league stint late in the year, this time with the Cleveland Naps.

In three starts for Cleveland, Glendon had three complete games and gave up just three earned runs, for a 0.98 earned run average. However, he also gave up six unearned runs and therefore lost two of his three decisions. He played his last MLB game on September 25. Glendon then spent a year in Columbus, Ohio, going 12–14, and a year in New Orleans.

Glendon pitched in the Tri-State League from 1906 to 1908, making stops in York, Johnstown, Altoona, and Lancaster. He won 13 games in 1906 and 15 games in 1907. After going just 3–4 in 1908, Glendon retired from baseball. He had a total win–loss record of 96–87 in the minor leagues, to go along with his 1–3 major league record.

Glendon died in Chicago, Illinois, at the age of 73.
