= Dick Scott (right-handed pitcher) =

American baseball player (1883–1911)

- Pitcher
- Born: February 5, 1883; Bethel, Ohio
- Died: January 18, 1911 (aged 27); Chicago
- Batted: Right Threw: Right

MLB debut
- June 26, 1901, for the Cincinnati Reds

Last MLB appearance
- July 8, 1901, for the Cincinnati Reds

MLB statistics
- Win–loss record: 0–2
- Strikeouts: 7
- ERA: 5.14
- Stats at Baseball Reference

Teams
- Cincinnati Reds (1901)

Amos Richard Scott (February 5, 1883 – January 18, 1911) was an American baseball pitcher who played for the Cincinnati Reds in 1901.

== Biography ==
Scott was born on February 5, 1883, in Bethel, Ohio. He was signed by the Cincinnati Reds after he wrote about his amateur performance to Cincinnati newspapers. He started two games for the 1901 Reds, losing 6–2 and 9–3, both times against the New York Giants and Hall of Fame pitcher Christy Mathewson. He had an earned run average of 5.14 with 7 strikeouts.

He stood at six feet tall and weighed 180 pounds.

Dick Scott committed suicide by slitting his wrists with a pocket knife in Chicago on January 18, 1911.
