= Ed Murphy (pitcher) =

American baseball player (1877–1935)

- Pitcher
- Born: January 22, 1877; Auburn, New York, U.S.
- Died: January 29, 1935 (aged 58); Weedsport, New York, U.S.
- Batted: Unknown Threw: Right

MLB debut
- April 23, 1898, for the Philadelphia Phillies

Last MLB appearance
- September 19, 1903, for the St. Louis Cardinals

MLB statistics
- Win–loss record: 25–25
- Earned run average: 3.64
- strikeouts: 103
- Stats at Baseball Reference

Teams
- Philadelphia Phillies (1898); St. Louis Cardinals (1901–1903)

Edward J. Murphy (January 22, 1877 – January 29, 1935) was an American Major League Baseball pitcher who played from 1898 to 1903. Murphy was born in Auburn, New York, on January 22, 1877. He did not attend college but played his first major league game when he was 21 years old on April 23, 1898. Coming into the league at 6 ft 1 in (1.85 m), 186 lbs, Murphy first played for the Philadelphia Phillies and then the St. Louis Cardinals. He was a pitcher who threw left-handed and his batting hand was unknown. He died on January 29, 1935, in Weedsport, New York.
