= Emil Haberer =

American baseball player (1878–1951)

- Catcher, first baseman, third baseman
- Born: February 2, 1878; Cincinnati, Ohio
- Died: October 19, 1951 (aged 73); Shively, Kentucky
- Batted: Right Threw: Right

MLB debut
- July 9, 1901, for the Cincinnati Reds

Last MLB appearance
- September 3, 1909, for the Cincinnati Reds

MLB statistics
- Batting average: .149
- Runs scored: 4
- Runs batted in: 3
- Games played: 16
- Stats at Baseball Reference

Teams
- Cincinnati Reds (1901; 1903; 1909)

Emil Karl Haberer (February 2, 1878 – October 19, 1951) was a catcher and corner infielder in Major League Baseball who played for the Cincinnati Reds in part of three seasons spanning 1901–1909.

Besides, Haberer played with the Cincinnati Elks lodge baseball team in a game which was chronicled by the Cincinnati Historical Society bulletin.
