= Jerry Hurley (1900s catcher) =

American baseball player (1875–1919)

- Catcher
- Born: April 1875; New York City, U.S.
- Died: December 27, 1919 (aged 44); New York City, U.S.
- Batted: Right Threw: Right

MLB debut
- September 22, 1901, for the Cincinnati Reds

Last MLB appearance
- April 15, 1907, for the Brooklyn Superbas

MLB statistics
- Batting average: .043
- Home runs: 0
- Runs batted in: 0
- Stats at Baseball Reference

Teams
- Cincinnati Reds (1901); Brooklyn Superbas (1907)

Jeremiah Hurley (April, 1875 in New York City – December 27, 1919 in New York City), was an American professional baseball player who played catcher in nine games for the 1901 Cincinnati Reds and one game for the 1907 Brooklyn Superbas.

Hurley's recorded professional minor-league career began at 23 years of age in 1898, when he played for Utica of the Class B New York State League. He spent two more seasons in Utica and then joined Utica's fellow NYSL member Schenectady. Near the end of the 1901 season, the last-place Cincinnati Reds of the National League signed him as a catcher, backing up Bill Bergen. He returned to the minors for four more seasons, first with the New Orleans Pelicans of the Southern Association and later for Binghamton and Amsterdam-Gloversville-Johnstown of the New York State League.

Before the 1906 season, the Pittsburgh Pirates signed Hurley to a major league contract, but he was released before the season began. The Brooklyn Superbas signed Hurley before the 1907 season, and he appeared in one regular-season game (the second game of the season) before being released. Ironically, Hurley's former Pittsburgh teammate Bill Bergen took his spot on the Brooklyn roster. Hurley spent the rest of the 1907 season with the Toronto Maple Leafs, who won the Eastern League pennant. In 1908, he played for the Eastern League's last-place team, the Rochester Bronchos.

He moved down a level in 1909 to Elmira of the Class B New York State League (also known as "the State League.") Hurley was appointed Elmira's manager in mid-season, and even though the team finished a respectable 68-68, he was fired at the end of the season. Even though newspaper accounts indicate that he was a popular player, his experience managing in Elmira in 1909 was apparently not a positive one. After the season, Hurley told a writer for the Syracuse Journal, "I am through with base ball for good. I have no desire to manage any more base ball clubs." However, after being traded to the Wilkes-Barre Barons and initially refusing to sign a contract, Hurley did come back to play for the State League's Syracuse Stars in 1910. There, he had the honor of catching future Hall of Famer Grover Cleveland Alexander.

Jerry Hurley played at least one more season of pro ball in 1911 for two different Class B Tri-State League teams. He probably also turned up three years later on the roster of the 1914 Poughkeepsie Honey Bugs, who won the Class D Atlantic League pennant. The Baseball Reference database officially lists this Jerry Hurley as a different man by the same name, however. A team photo of the 1914 Poughkeepsie squad has survived showing a player named "Hurley" who looks like the same Hurley who appears on the 1907 Toronto team photos.

Hurley died on December 27, 1919, at the age of 44.
