= Jack Harper (1900s pitcher) =

American baseball player (1878–1950)

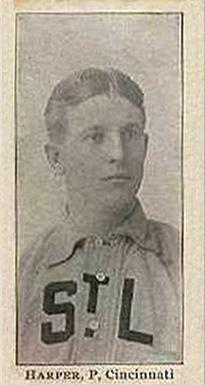
- Pitcher
- Born: April 2, 1878; Galloway, Pennsylvania, U.S.
- Died: September 30, 1950 (aged 72); Jamestown, New York, U.S.
- Batted: Right Threw: Right

MLB debut
- September 18, 1899, for the Cleveland Spiders

Last MLB appearance
- June 6, 1906, for the Chicago Cubs

MLB statistics
- Win–loss record: 80–64
- Earned run average: 3.55
- Strikeouts: 466
- Stats at Baseball Reference

Teams
- Cleveland Spiders (1899); St. Louis Cardinals (1900–1901); St. Louis Browns (1902); Cincinnati Reds (1903–1906); Chicago Cubs (1906)

Charles William "Jack" Harper (April 2, 1878 – September 30, 1950) was an American pitcher in Major League Baseball. He pitched eight seasons in the majors, from 1899 to 1906.

Harper started his professional baseball career in 1898. After a short stint with the Cleveland Spiders, he had a good season with the Fort Wayne Indians of the Interstate League in 1900 (going 20-15). This got him into the majors for good.

Over the next few seasons, Harper jumped from league to league, finally settling in with the Cincinnati Reds. He had his best season in 1904, when he went 23–9 with a 2.30 earned run average.

Harper's professional baseball career ended in 1906, after pitching only one inning of his first start after being traded to the Cubs. According to a popular story at the time, Harper had hit Cubs first baseman and eventual player-manager Frank Chance by pitches three times in a 1904 game, knocking him out with the third; Chance would trade for him two seasons later and bench him out of spite, effectively ending his career due to the reserve clause. However, Chance had had other confrontations with pitchers, and contemporary newspaper accounts dispute that the hit-by-pitches were severe or malicious. In reality, Harper struggled with injuries after joining the Cubs and was hit by a Dan McGann line drive in his only game with them. He would make an appearance for the minor league Columbus Senators the following season, but otherwise never played professional baseball again.

== See also ==
- List of Cincinnati Reds Opening Day starting pitchers
