= John Heileman =

American baseball player (1872–1940)

- Third baseman
- Born: August 10, 1872; Cincinnati, Ohio
- Died: July 19, 1940 (aged 67); Cincinnati, Ohio
- Batted: Right Threw: Right

MLB debut
- July 8, 1901, for the Cincinnati Reds

Last MLB appearance
- July 21, 1901, for the Cincinnati Reds

MLB statistics
- Batting average: .133
- Runs scored: 1
- Runs batted in: 1
- Stats at Baseball Reference

Teams
- Cincinnati Reds (1901)

John George Heileman (August 10, 1872 – July 19, 1940) was an American professional baseball infielder. He played briefly in Major League Baseball for the 1901 Cincinnati Reds. He was erroneously known as Chink Heileman.

== Biography ==
Heileman played five games for the Cincinnati Reds in July 1901, registering two hits in 15 at bats along with one run scored and one run batted in. Defensively, he played four games as a third baseman and one game as a second baseman. The only other team Heileman is known to have played for was the minor league Beaumont Oil Gushers of the South Texas League in 1903, appearing in 115 games and compiling a .172 batting average.

Heileman later became a night watchman at a music hall; he died in 1940. He was survived by his wife, a daughter, and a son.

Before May 2021, Heileman was listed on the Baseball-Reference.com site under the nickname "Chink" Heileman. However, contemporary newspaper reports from his brief baseball career are only known to have referred to him by his surname, and his death notice made no mention of a nickname. His son, George, who was also a professional baseball player (although not in the major leagues), was known by that nickname.
