= Jock Menefee =

American baseball player (1868–1953)

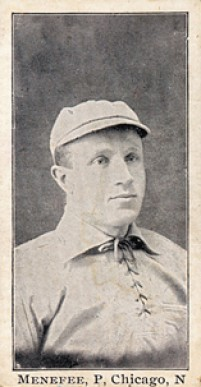
- Pitcher / Outfielder
- Born: January 15, 1868; Rowlesburg, West Virginia, U.S.
- Died: March 11, 1953 (aged 85); Belle Vernon, Pennsylvania, U.S.
- Batted: Right Threw: Right

MLB debut
- August 17, 1892, for the Pittsburgh Pirates

Last MLB appearance
- September 7, 1903, for the Chicago Cubs

MLB statistics
- Win–loss record: 58–70
- Earned run average: 3.81
- Strikeouts: 293
- Stats at Baseball Reference

Teams
- Pittsburgh Pirates (1892); Louisville Colonels (1893–1894); Pittsburgh Pirates (1894–1895); New York Giants (1898); Chicago Orphans / Cubs (1900–1903)

John "Jock" Menefee (January 15, 1868 – March 11, 1953) was an American pitcher in Major League Baseball who played from 1892 through 1903 for the Pittsburgh Pirates, Louisville Colonels, New York Giants, and Chicago Orphans / Cubs.

Menefee became the first National League pitcher to pull off a successful steal of home, a feat which he accomplished against Brooklyn on July 15, 1902. He ended his career as the starting pitcher in a doubleheader against Pittsburgh on the 7th of September, not getting a decision in either game.
