= Bill Phyle =

American baseball player (1875–1953)

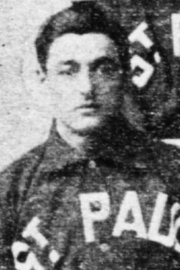
- Pitcher / Third baseman
- Born: June 25, 1875; Duluth, Minnesota
- Died: August 6, 1953 (aged 78); Los Angeles, California
- Batted: Unknown Threw: Right

MLB debut
- September 17, 1898, for the Chicago Orphans

Last MLB appearance
- September 15, 1906, for the St. Louis Cardinals

MLB statistics
- Win–loss record: 10–19
- Earned run average: 3.96
- Strikeouts: 76
- Batting average: .176
- Stats at Baseball Reference

Teams
- Chicago Orphans (1898–1899); New York Giants (1901); St. Louis Cardinals (1906)

William Joseph Phyle (June 25, 1875 – August 6, 1953), born in Duluth, Minnesota was a pitcher for Major League Baseball's Chicago Orphans (1898–99) and New York Giants (1901) and a third baseman for the St. Louis Cardinals (1906). He pitched a shutout on his Major League debut, in a 9–0 victory over the Washington Senators on September 17, 1898.

After his playing career finished, Phyle was an umpire in the Pacific Coast League.

== Sources ==
- Career statistics from Baseball Reference · Baseball Reference (Minors) · Retrosheet · Baseball Almanac
