= Doc Newton =

American baseball player (1877–1931)

- Pitcher
- Born: October 26, 1877; Indianapolis, Indiana, U.S.
- Died: May 14, 1931 (aged 53); Memphis, Tennessee, U.S.
- Batted: Left Threw: Left

MLB debut
- April 27, 1900, for the Cincinnati Reds

Last MLB appearance
- May 7, 1909, for the New York Highlanders

MLB statistics
- Win–loss record: 54–72
- Earned run average: 3.22
- Strikeouts: 502
- Stats at Baseball Reference

Teams
- Cincinnati Reds (1900–1901); Brooklyn Superbas (1901–1902); New York Highlanders (1905–1909)

Eustace James Newton (October 26, 1877 – May 14, 1931) was an American Major League Baseball (MLB) pitcher who played for several teams in both the National League and American League. He finished with a 54–72 win–loss record, a 3.22 earned run average (ERA), and 99 complete games. He had his best season in 1902 for Brooklyn, when he went 15–14 with a 2.42 ERA.

== Early life ==
Newton was born in Indianapolis. An article in the Sporting Life magazine from April 1907 said he played college baseball for Morris Hall University, while others claim Morris Halo, or Morris Hale. The most likely match is Moores Hill College, a school that closed in 1915.

== Career ==
Doc began his MLB career in 1900 when he played for the Cincinnati Reds. He was in the regular pitching rotation that first season, but finished with a 9–15 win–loss record, and 4.14 ERA. The 1901 season wasn't much better for Newton, as he began the same effectiveness as the previous season. After 20 games, his win–loss record was 4–13, and his ERA was 4.12. The Reds decided to release him from the team on July 13 of that season, and he was signed by the Brooklyn Superbas three days later. Newton set the single-season NL record for errors by a pitcher (since 1900) with 17 for Cincinnati and Brooklyn in 1901.

With this new scenery, he pitched well to finish off that 1901 season, winning six games, and keeping his ERA a low 2.83. The 1902 season, still with Brooklyn, proved to be his best Major League season, as he had a 15–14 win–loss record, a 2.42 ERA, along with 26 complete games, and four shutouts.

Doc returned to the minors the following season, playing in the Pacific Coast League in 1903, and had two successful seasons, winning 34 games in the while pitching for the Los Angeles Angels. During a stretch of two months, starting August 7, he won 11 games in a row, including a no-hitter on November 8 against the Oakland Oaks. It was the first no-hitter ever tossed in the PCL. Later, in 1904, he won 39 games. A researcher as uncovered another game in 1903 that, by the governing rules of the day, gives Newton an added victory in 1903, bringing his record up to 35–12.

On October 4, 1904, the New York Highlanders selected Newton the Rule 5 draft. He pitched well, just not well enough to win games on a regular basis. His ERAs were low during his time in New York, 2.96, but his win–loss records did not match it, 20–25. His manager in New York, Clark Griffith, said that the Highlanders failed to win the 1906 pennant because of Newton's lack of physical conditioning; Newton had been suspended mid-season for dissipation.

== Post-career ==
After baseball, he worked for the Memphis Terminal Corporation in Memphis, Tennessee and the Federal Compress Company in West Memphis, Arkansas. He died at age 50 at his home on Southern Avenue in Memphis due to an indigestion attack on May 14, 1931. He is interred at Crown Hill Cemetery and Arboretum in Indianapolis.
