= Heinie Peitz =

American baseball player (1870–1943)

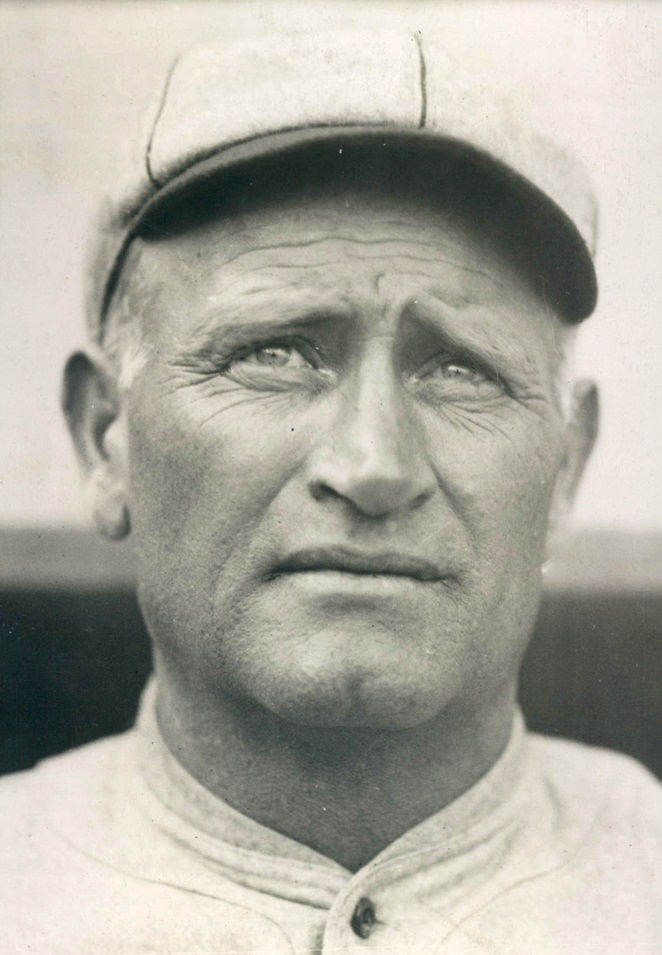
- Catcher
- Born: November 28, 1870; St. Louis, Missouri, U.S.
- Died: October 23, 1943 (aged 72); Cincinnati, Ohio, U.S.
- Batted: Right Threw: Right

MLB debut
- October 15, 1892, for the St. Louis Browns

Last MLB appearance
- June 1, 1913, for the St. Louis Cardinals

MLB statistics
- Batting average: .271
- Home runs: 16
- Runs batted in: 560
- Stats at Baseball Reference

Teams
- St. Louis Browns (1893–1895); Cincinnati Reds (1896–1904); Pittsburgh Pirates (1905–1906); St. Louis Cardinals (1913)

Henry Clement "Heinie" Peitz (November 28, 1870 – October 23, 1943) was an American professional baseball catcher. He played in Major League Baseball for the St. Louis Browns, Cincinnati Reds, Pittsburgh Pirates and St. Louis Cardinals. He was part of the famed "Pretzel Battery" with pitcher Ted Breitenstein while playing for the Browns and Reds in the 1890s.

In 16 seasons of Major League Baseball, Peitz appeared in 1,234 games, scored 532 runs, compiled a .342 career on-base percentage, and had 1,117 hits, 191 doubles, 66 triples, 560 RBIs, 91 stolen bases, and 409 bases on balls.

Peitz was also the manager of the Louisville Colonels and led the team to an American Association pennant in 1909. He was also employed as a scout, coach, and umpire after retiring as a player. In 2003, he was ranked as the 82nd best catcher of all time by Bill James in The New Bill James Historical Abstract.

== Early years ==
Peitz was born in St. Louis, Missouri, in 1870. His parents, Henry and Angela Peitz, were natives of Westphalia in what is now Germany. At the time of the 1880 United States census, the family lived in St. Louis, and Peitz's father was employed as a laborer.

== Minor leagues ==
Peitz played baseball from 1889 to 1913. Peitz began his long career with a semipro team in Hillsboro, Illinois in 1889. In 1890, he played for a team in Jacksonville, Illinois. In 1892, he played for the Montgomery Lambs of the Southern Association. He appeared in 113 games during the 1892 season for Montgomery.

== St. Louis Browns ==
The St. Louis Browns acquired Peitz in the fall of 1892, and he made his Major League Baseball debut in the final game of the season in October 1892. He played three full seasons for the Browns from 1893 to 1895. While catching for the Browns, Peitz teamed up with left-handed pitcher Ted Breitenstein, and the pair became known as the "Pretzel Battery." Peitz and Breitenstein were both sons of German immigrants and St. Louis natives. In the "Cardinals Encyclopedia", authors Mike Eisenbath and Stan Musial wrote that The "Pretzel Battery" was "one of the few things exciting about St. Louis's National League team those first few seasons." The nickname reportedly developed when the pair were drinking beer and eating pretzels after a game, when a fan noticed them and yelled, "Look, it's the 'pretzel battery'."

== Cincinnati Reds ==
In November 1895, Peitz was traded by the Browns to the Cincinnati Reds with Red Ehret in exchange Arlie Latham, Ed McFarland, Morgan Murphy, Tom Parrott and cash. Peitz gained his greatest acclaim as the catcher for the Reds from 1896 to 1904. The "Pretzel Battery" was reunited in Cincinnati when Ted Breitenstein was sold to the Reds in 1896. Peitz developed a reputation for his ability to manage pitchers. He caught two no-hitters for the Reds, including the first no-hitter of the 20th century thrown by Reds' pitcher Noodles Hahn in July 1900. Peitz had his best years as a batsman in 1901 and 1902 when he batted .305 and .314, respectively.

Described as "a rough and ready catcher from the old school", Peitz also worked as a "floorwalker" in a Cincinnati pub during the off season.

== Pittsburgh Pirates ==
Late in the 1904 season, the Pittsburgh Pirates expressed an interest in acquiring Peitz. The club's president, Hermann, noted at the time:

Catchers of the Peitz kind are scarce. I know he is not a Beaumont on his feet, but he is a corking good man for a team because he always knows what to do and how to do it, and what better do you want? A catcher of the Peitz kind runs the whole game from behind the bat. I wish we had him, and if the Reds let him go it would be a serious mistake.

In February 1905, the Pirates got their opportunity to acquire Peitz and traded Ed Phelps to acquire him from the Reds. He played two years with the Pirates in 1905 and 1906. Peitz quickly became a favorite in Pittsburgh. In March 1905, The Pittsburgh Press reported: "He is already one of the most popular men on the team. Peitz may not be the fastest man in the world on his feet, but he can go some with his tongue. The Cincinnati German is the speediest man by far on the team at repartee."

== Louisville Colonels ==
After the 1906 season, Pittsburgh manager Fred Clarke sent Peitz to the minors, releasing him to the Louisville Colonels of the American Association. Despite his talent as a catcher, Peitz was said to be so slow in 1906 that some joked that "he has to drive the ball over the fence to get to first base." When Peitz was sent to Louisville, The Pittsburgh Press noted:

When it comes to steady backstopping and the intelligent handling of pitchers, so as to get the best possible results out of their work, the German veteran is there with the best of them. No catcher knows the game better than Peitz. There is none better qualified to coach young pitchers and to handle them both before and during a game. Batsmen fear him, for he knows their weaknesses ...

Another sportswriter noted that the release of Peitz sounded a note of warning that led to the release of other old-time stars: "The greatest must eventually fall, and that is what has happened to Peitz, [Joe] Kelley and others."

Peitz spent parts of four years playing for Louisville from 1907 to 1910. Peitz also managed the Louisville club and won an American Association pennant with the team in 1909. Peitz was presented with a diamond ring by his players and "local admirers" after leading the team to the pennant.

Peitz was released by Louisville in July 1910 and played briefly during the 1910 season with the Lancaster Lanks of the Ohio State League.

== Coaching and umpiring career ==
After retiring as a player, Peitz was a coach with the Cincinnati Reds during the 1912 season. Peitz was the first coach in team history. He was described by sportswriter Ken Mulford Jr., as "one of the prize coaches when he wore the red. His cheery voice was an inspiration to the players on base and, as a matter of whispered fact, there were qualities in that sarcastic little yelp of his that never helped the fellow (pitcher) on the firing line."

In January 1913, manager Frank Chance of the New York Yankees tried to hire Peitz to work with the Yankees' young pitchers. At the time, Chance opined that Peitz was "one of the best coachers and would be just the man to handle the Yankee boxmen." Peitz instead signed as a coach for the St. Louis Cardinals during the 1913 season, working principally as a third-base coach. At age 42, Peitz also made a brief return as a player, appearing in three games for the Cardinals in 1913. Peitz's turn at catcher was necessitated due to injuries to the Cardinals' catchers, and Peitz proved to be a valuable substitute. One sportswriter at the time noted: "He performed like a youngster and even showed up the famous [Jimmy] Archer. He threw the speedy [Heinie] Zimmerman out twice when he tried to steal."

In September 1914, after being released by the Cardinals, Peitz signed to coach the Kansas City Blues of the American Association.

In January 1915, Peitz was hired as umpire in the Central League. In May 1915, Peitz announced his retirement as an umpire, indicating that he had been forced to retire due to illness.

== Family and later years ==
In approximately 1891, Peitz was married to Maggie Peitz, a German immigrant who was born at sea in 1868. At the time of the 1900 United States census, Peitz and his wife were living in Cincinnati. They had a daughter, Viola (born March 1898), and an infant son (born June 1900).

At the time of the 1910 United States census, Peitz was living in Meade County, Kentucky with his wife (identified in the census as Martha) and their daughter Viola.

At the time of the 1920 United States census, Peitz was living in Cincinnati with his wife (identified in the census as Martha) and their daughter Viola. Peitz was employed at that time as a painter with the American Laundry Machinery company in Cincinnati.

At the time of the 1930 United States census, Peitz was living in Norwood, Ohio with his wife, Martha. His occupation at that time was listed as a painter at an auto body factory.

In August 1932, Peitz, at age 61, played in an old-timers reunion game in Cincinnati. Others participating in the game included Tris Speaker, Honus Wagner, Nick Altrock and Cy Young.

Peitz died at General Hospital in Cincinnati at the age of 72.

His brother, Joe Peitz, was his teammate on the Browns in 1894.

== See also ==
- List of St. Louis Cardinals coaches
