= John Dobbs =

American baseball player (1875–1934)

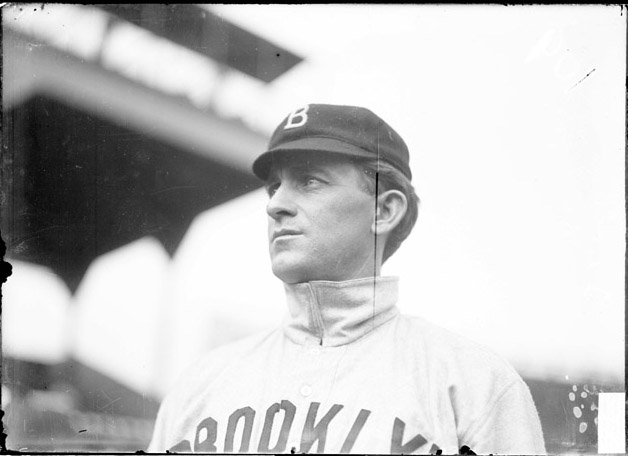
- Outfielder
- Born: June 3, 1875; Chattanooga, Tennessee, U.S.
- Died: September 9, 1934 (aged 53); Charlotte, North Carolina, U.S.
- Batted: Left Threw: Right

MLB debut
- April 20, 1901, for the Cincinnati Reds

Last MLB appearance
- September 20, 1905, for the Brooklyn Superbas

MLB statistics
- Batting average: .263
- Home runs: 7
- Runs batted in: 207
- Stats at Baseball Reference

Teams
- Cincinnati Reds (1901–1902); Chicago Orphans / Cubs (1902–1903); Brooklyn Superbas (1903–1905)

John Gordon Dobbs (June 3, 1875 – September 9, 1934) was an American professional baseball outfielder. He played five seasons in Major League Baseball (MLB) from 1901 to 1905 for the Cincinnati Reds, Chicago Orphans/Cubs, and Brooklyn Superbas.

In 582 games over 5 seasons, Dobbs posted a .263 batting average (585-for-2224) with 305 runs, 7 home runs, 207 RBIs and 78 stolen bases. He finished his career with a .949 fielding percentage playing at outfield and several games at second and third base and shortstop.
