= Tommy Corcoran =

American baseball player (1869–1960)

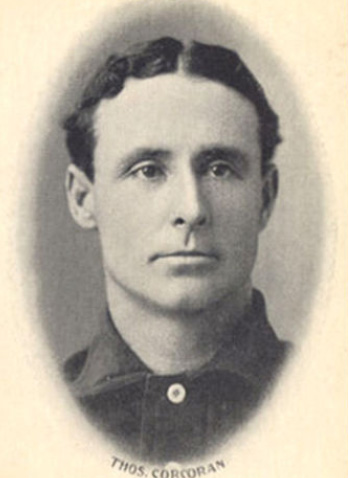
- Shortstop
- Born: January 4, 1869; New Haven, Connecticut, U.S.
- Died: June 25, 1960 (aged 91); Plainfield, Connecticut, U.S.
- Batted: Right Threw: Right

MLB debut
- April 19, 1890, for the Pittsburgh Burghers

Last MLB appearance
- July 10, 1907, for the New York Giants

MLB statistics
- Batting average: .256
- Hits: 2,259
- Home runs: 34
- Runs batted in: 1,137
- Stats at Baseball Reference

Teams
- Pittsburgh Burghers (1890); Philadelphia Athletics (1891); Brooklyn Grooms / Bridegrooms (1892–1896); Cincinnati Reds (1897–1906); New York Giants (1907)

Thomas William Corcoran (January 4, 1869 – June 25, 1960) was an American professional baseball player. He played in Major League Baseball as a shortstop from 1890 to 1907 for the Pittsburgh Burghers (1890), Philadelphia Athletics (1891), Brooklyn Grooms/Brooklyn Bridegrooms (1892–1896), Cincinnati Reds (1897–1906) and the New York Giants (1907). The 5 ft 9 in (1.75 m) Connecticut native occasionally played second base later in his career. He batted and threw right-handed.

== Career ==
Born in New Haven, Connecticut, Corcoran gained the nicknames Corky and Tommy the Cork. He was considered a hard-working, supple-handed shortstop. His fielding style was compared with Hall of Famer Bid McPhee.

Corcoran batted .300 in a season just once (1894). He was a barehanded fielder early in his career when gloves were gradually becoming standard equipment, and made the transition to a glove without difficulty. He became adept at going to his right to field ground balls backhanded. Corcoran set a still-standing ML record for shortstops with 14 assists in a nine-inning game. (Lave Cross had 15 assists in a 12-inning game in 1897.) Corcoran finished in the top 10 in the league in at bats seven times.

After starting his Major League career with the Pittsburgh Burghers of the Players Association in 1891 and then joining the Philadelphia Athletics in 1892, he started his National League career with the Brooklyn Grooms in 1892. He was traded to the Cincinnati Reds after the 1896 season. He had held out on Brooklyn before the 1896 season and held out again at the beginning of the 1897 season after the trade in order to get an increase on his $10 per day salary. He was sold from Cincinnati to the New York Giants for an undisclosed sum in December 1906.

After being released by the Giants in July 1907, Corcoran played for a few minor league teams in 1907 and 1908, including the Uniontown Coal Barons. While with the Coal Barons he spent some time as interim manager before Billy Lauder took over, and he received offers to manage the Dayton Veterans of the Central League and the Jersey City Skeeters of the Eastern League, both of which he declined.

Over an 18-season career, Corcoran batted .256, with 34 home runs and 1,135 RBIs. He had a total of 387 stolen bases, scored 1,184 runs, and made 2,256 hits in 8,812 career at-bats. He accumulated 2,957 total bases.

Late in his playing career Corcoran stated that baseball had become more of a trade than it was when he began his career, stating that "The compensation for good ball players is better now than when I began playing the game, but the extractions are greater. In the old days baseball was more or less a lark; now it is a business, and our business is to win."

After retiring as a player, Corcoran became an umpire; his umpiring included one season in the short-lived third major circuit, the Federal League.

Corcoran had four sons and a daughter. He died at the age of 91 in Plainfield, Connecticut.

== See also ==
- List of Major League Baseball career hits leaders
- List of Major League Baseball career triples leaders
- List of Major League Baseball career runs scored leaders
- List of Major League Baseball career runs batted in leaders
- List of Major League Baseball career stolen bases leaders
