= Crese Heismann =

American baseball player (1880–1951)

- Pitcher
- Born: April 16, 1880; Cincinnati, Ohio, U.S.
- Died: November 19, 1951 (aged 71); Cincinnati, Ohio, U.S.
- Batted: Right Threw: Left

MLB debut
- September 25, 1901, for the Cincinnati Reds

Last MLB appearance
- September 4, 1902, for the Baltimore Orioles

MLB statistics
- Win–loss record: 2–5
- Earned run average: 4.74
- Strikeouts: 23
- Stats at Baseball Reference

Teams
- Cincinnati Reds (1901–1902); Baltimore Orioles (1902)

Christian Ernest Heismann (April 16, 1880 – November 19, 1951) was an American Major League Baseball pitcher who played in 1901 and 1902 with the Cincinnati Reds and the Baltimore Orioles. He batted right and threw left-handed.

He was born and died in Cincinnati.
