= Ed Poole =

American baseball player (1874–1920)

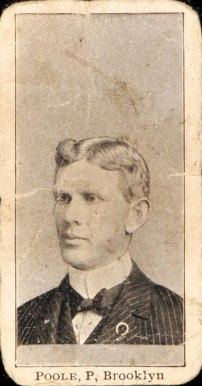
- Pitcher
- Born: September 7, 1874; Canton, Ohio, U.S.
- Died: March 11, 1920 (aged 45); Malvern, Ohio, U.S.
- Batted: Right Threw: Right

MLB debut
- October 6, 1900, for the Pittsburgh Pirates

Last MLB appearance
- July 27, 1904, for the Brooklyn Superbas

MLB statistics
- Win–loss record: 33–35
- Earned run average: 3.04
- Strikeouts: 226
- Stats at Baseball Reference

Teams
- Pittsburgh Pirates (1900–1902); Cincinnati Reds (1902–1903); Brooklyn Superbas (1904)

Edward Isaih Poole (September 7, 1874 – March 11, 1920) was an American pitcher in Major League Baseball. He played from 1900 to 1904 with the Pittsburgh Pirates, Cincinnati Reds, and Brooklyn Superbas. Poole stood at 5 ft 10 in (1.78 m) and weighed 175 lbs.

== Career ==
Poole was born in Canton, Ohio. He started his professional baseball career in 1897 and played in the Interstate League for four seasons. In 1900, he went 20–15 for the Wheeling Stogies. He also played in the infield and outfield when he didn't pitch and batted .257. Poole was then acquired by the Pirates and made his Major League debut in October of that year.

In 1901, Poole pitched sparingly for Pittsburgh, making 10 starts and going 5–4. The Pirates won their first National League pennant. In April 1902, Poole was traded to Cincinnati and immediately had his greatest success in the Major Leagues. He made 16 starts for the Reds and completed all 16, while going 12–4 with a 2.15 earned run average.

In 1903, Poole suffered from a sore arm early in the season. His record dropped to 7–13, and his ERA went up to 3.28. He was sold to Brooklyn in 1904, but the reasons for the trade apparently had nothing to do with his pitching. According to the Reds' president, Garry Herrmann, Poole had a habit of reading books in the dugout.

"One day, when we were playing in Cincinnati, I noticed that Poole was deeply engrossed in a book while sitting on the players' bench in uniform ... The next day and the next I noticed that Poole had the same book, and then I began to grow suspicious. Inquiry developed the fact that instead of a rule book he had a novel, which he was reading daily. That settled his chances for remaining with the Reds, and when Brooklyn asked for him we parted with him willingly. Novels and baseball don't mix when a game is being played on the field." – Garry Herrmann

Poole's troubles did not end in Cincinnati. Playing baseball on Sunday was not allowed in New York at the time, but Brooklyn Superbas owner Charles Ebbets tried to circumvent the law. For a game played on Sunday, April 24, Poole had the misfortune of being the starting pitcher. Just as the game got underway, policemen marched onto the field and arrested him, along with two other players. Poole had to go to court and was eventually fined for violating the blue laws. He then pitched again on Sunday, May 29, and was arrested for the second time. That case went to trial and became known as The People of New York v. Poole.

Poole started off 8–14 for Brooklyn that season, and he pitched the last Major League game of his career on July 27. He spent the rest of the year hunting rabbits and quail near his home in Canton. Poole returned to baseball the following season and played in the minor leagues from 1905 to 1908. In 1905, he pitched a career-high 298 innings and won a career-high 21 games for the Providence Clamdiggers of the Eastern League. He then won 14 and 17 games the next two seasons but just 4 in 1908, after which his career ended.

Poole later became a merchant. He died of diabetes mellitus in 1920 in Malvern, Ohio, and was interred in Bethlehem Cemetery in that town.
