= League Park (Cincinnati) =

Baseball park in Cincinnati, Ohio, U.S.

Cincinnati's League Park
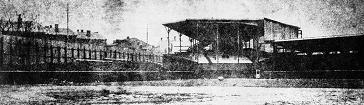
- Interactive map of Cincinnati's League Park
- Former names: American Park (1884–1890)
- Location: Findlay St. & McLean Ave., Cincinnati, Ohio, United States
- Coordinates: 39°7′1″N 84°32′12″W
- Capacity: 9,000 (1901); 7,000 (1894–1900); 3,000 (1884–1893)
- Surface: Grass
- Field size: Left Field – 253 ft (77 m)

Construction
- Groundbreaking: 1884
- Opened: May 1, 1884
- Renovated: April 20, 1894
- Closed: October 2, 1901
- Demolished: 1901

Tenants
- Cincinnati Reds (AA/NL) (1884–1901); Cincinnati Bearcats (NCAA) (1891-1893)

League Park was a Major League baseball park located in Cincinnati, Ohio, United States. It was the home of the Cincinnati Reds from 1884 through 1901. The ballpark was on an asymmetrical block bounded by Findlay Street (south), Western Avenue (northeast, angling), York Street (north) and McLean Avenue (west).

The "Findlay and Western" intersection was the home field of the Reds from 1884 through June 24, 1970, when the team moved to Riverfront Stadium. The location of the diamond and consequently the main grandstand seating area was shifted several times during the 86½ seasons the Reds played on the site. League Park was actually the first of three parks to stand on the site:

1884–1901: League Park
1902–1911: Palace of the Fans
1912–1970: Redland Field, renamed Crosley Field in 1934

== History ==
During the Cincinnati Reds' first two seasons, the club played at the Bank Street Grounds. Following the 1883 season, the Reds were forced to abandon the park, because the lease had been bought out from under them by the new Cincinnati entry in the one-year wonder called the Union Association.

The Reds had to find a new location, and they found one less than a mile away from their old park, a few blocks to the southeast on Western Avenue, at the northwest corner of where Findlay Street intersected Western. Thus the Reds remained in the West End, and fans had only to traverse Western Avenue to see the team of their choice.

The new facility was variously called Cincinnati Base Ball Grounds (or Park), Western Avenue Grounds, American Park (while in the AA), and then its most enduring pre-1912 name, League Park (beginning 1890). The small grandstand for the new park was built in the southeast corner of the block, tucked into the acute angle made by the intersection. Although the diamond would be moved back and forth between the southeast and the southwest corners several times, the little 1884 structure would be retained for 28 seasons, and would come in handy. However, it got off to a bad start. It was constructed hastily, and during the opening day game a portion of the stand collapsed, killing one spectator and injuring several others.

The park was also very short to right field, with balls hit over the right field fence counting only as a double, until additional land was acquired a few weeks into the season. This increased the distance to right by 50 feet and made the field regulation-sized.

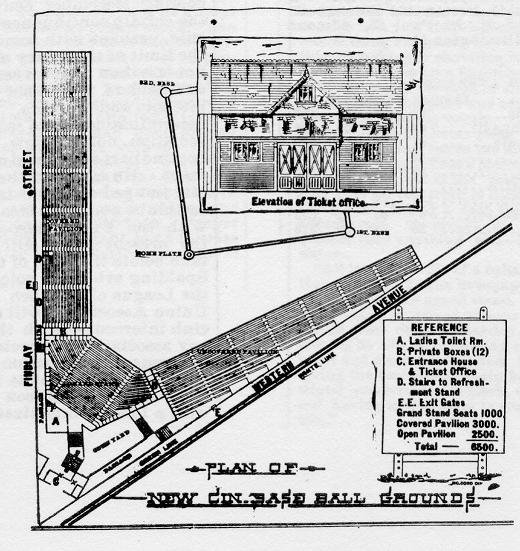
Seating chart of the ballpark in 1884

The first game to be played at American Park was on April 9, 1884. It was an exhibition game against the then National League Cleveland Blues. The Reds first official home opening day at American Park was on May 1, 1884 against their American Association rival the Columbus Buckeyes. Cincinnati lost that game 10–9 in heartbreaking fashion.

The season itself saw a good deal of competition between the Reds and the Unions. Although many called the Union the "Onion League" due to its lopsided distribution of talent, the Cincinnati Unions were a fairly strong team and drew fans away from the Reds. Once the Union folded, the Reds opted to remain at Findlay and Western, and would continue to do so for the better part of nine decades. Thus the Reds had the city to themselves in 1885.

Although the Reds were not participants in the 1885 World Series, their ballpark was. The contest, between the Chicago White Stockings of the NL and the St. Louis Browns of the AA, staged some of its games at neutral sites. The Reds' ballpark was the site for the final two games of the Series, a disputed match that officially ended in a draw.

When the Reds returned to the National League in 1890, the name of the park would come to be known as League Park, in reference to the team's original and now current circuit. In those days, the National League was typically referred to in media as "the League", since there was only one "League" and (for ten years) one "Association".

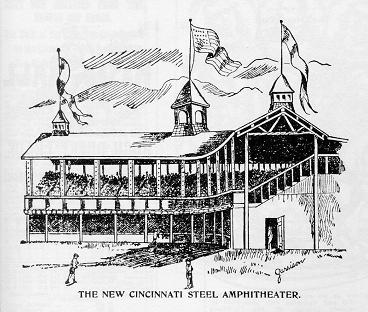
Rebuilt ballpark in 1894

In 1894 the ballpark went through some major changes. The owner of the Reds, John Brush, would build a brand new grandstand and add an amphitheater. In order to build a new grandstand he had the diamond shifted from the southeast corner (Findlay and Western) to the southwest corner (Findlay and McLean). Brush chose to retain the old seating as a right field pavilion. He also left a gap between the two seating areas. This would prove to be a wise decision.

The name of the ballpark was not changed. Because of the relocated diamond, some historians refer to it as League Park II. The center field fence was painted black in 1895 to form a batter's eye screen. Some sources (such as Benson) claim this was the first such screen in baseball.

Artist's conception of Bank Street vacant lot and Reds ballpark, early 1900.

On May 28, 1900, the ballpark caught on fire, burning the 1894 grandstand. The Reds considered moving to East End Park where the short-lived "Kelly's Killers" Association club had played in 1891. Instead, they opted to shift the diamond back to its original location in the southeast corner, reusing the original grandstand, which was not significantly harmed in the fire due to the gap between the two seating areas. They played a month's worth of games on the road, returning to their reconfigured home on June 28.

After a season and a half of playing in the charred ballpark, the Reds built what they expected to be a more permanent new grandstand, again in the southwest corner, retaining the original seating, and again with a gap between the seating areas that would prove fortuitous. The original seating had changed somewhat over time, as the middle section no longer sat higher than the rest (it had been rebuilt in 1894 to be leveled with the rest of the grandstand), and the entire structure was roofed.

The look of the new grandstand was striking, and the owners named it Palace of the Fans. While the park was still referred to as League Park until 1911, the grandstand nickname is what the park has become known as today. The 1884 grandstand remained in use as right field seating for Palace of the Fans until 1911, when both grandstands were demolished to build Redland Field on the same site, which would later become known as Crosley Field.

== Sources ==
- Cincinnati's Crosley Field: The Illustrated History of a Classic Ballpark by Greg Rhodes and John Erardi, 1995, Road West Publishing
- Baseball Library.com
- Green Cathedrals, by Phil Lowry, 1992
- Baseball Parks of North America, by Michael Benson, 1989
- The Cincinnati Reds, by Lee Allen, Putnam, 1948.

Preceded by Bank Street Grounds	Home of the Cincinnati Reds; 1884–1901	Succeeded by Palace of the Fans
