= Archie Stimmel =

American baseball player (1873–1958)

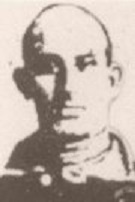
- Pitcher
- Born: May 30, 1873; Woodsboro, Maryland, U.S.
- Died: August 18, 1958 (aged 85); Frederick, Maryland, U.S.
- Batted: Right Threw: Right

MLB debut
- July 3, 1900, for the Cincinnati Reds

Last MLB appearance
- May 9, 1902, for the Cincinnati Reds

MLB statistics
- Win–loss record: 5–19
- Earned run average: 4.21
- Strikeouts: 64
- Stats at Baseball Reference

Teams
- Cincinnati Reds (1900–1902)

Archibald May Stimmel (May 30, 1873 – August 18, 1958) was an American Major League Baseball pitcher who played from 1900 to 1902 with the Cincinnati Reds. He batted and threw right-handed.
