= George Magoon =

American baseball player (1875–1943)

- Shortstop / Second baseman
- Born: March 27, 1875; St. Albans, Maine, U.S.
- Died: December 6, 1943 (aged 68); Rochester, New Hampshire, U.S.
- Batted: Right Threw: Right

MLB debut
- June 29, 1898, for the Brooklyn Bridegrooms

Last MLB appearance
- September 28, 1903, for the Chicago White Sox

MLB statistics
- Batting average: .239
- Home runs: 2
- Runs batted in: 201
- Stats at Baseball Reference

Teams
- Brooklyn Bridegrooms (1898); Baltimore Orioles (1899); Chicago Orphans (1899); Cincinnati Reds (1901–1903); Chicago White Sox (1903)

George Henry Magoon (March 27, 1875 – December 6, 1943) was an American professional baseball infielder who played in Major League Baseball from 1898 to 1903 with five different teams. In 522 games, he hit 2 home runs with 201 RBI. He was born in St. Albans, Maine, and died in Rochester, New Hampshire.
