= Bill Phillips (pitcher) =

American baseball player and manager (1868–1941)

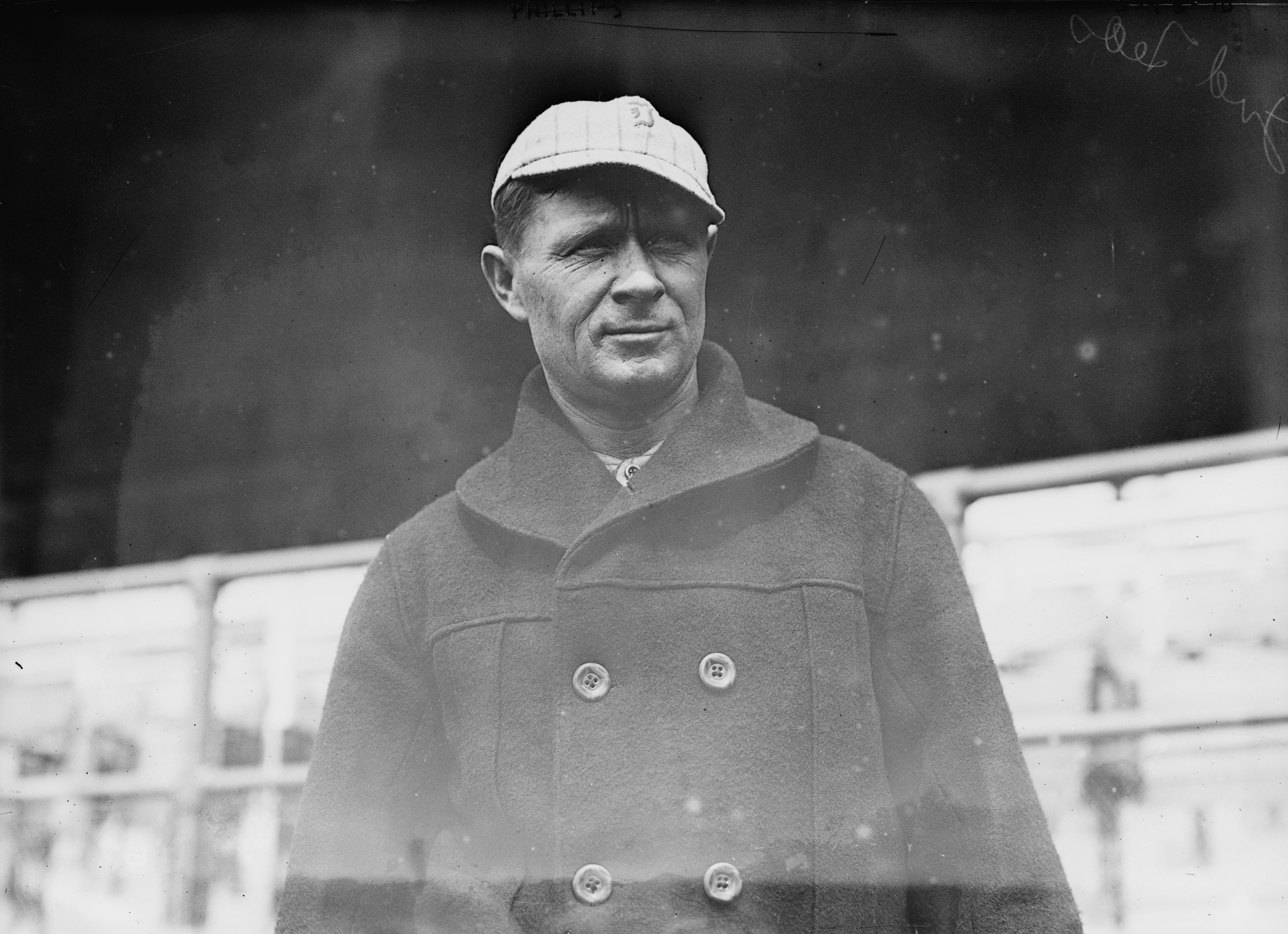
- Pitcher
- Born: November 9, 1868; Allenport, Pennsylvania, U.S.
- Died: October 25, 1941 (aged 72); Charleroi, Pennsylvania, U.S.
- Batted: Right Threw: Right

MLB debut
- August 11, 1890, for the Pittsburgh Alleghenys

Last MLB appearance
- September 22, 1903, for the Cincinnati Reds

MLB statistics
- Win–loss record: 70–76
- Earned run average: 4.09
- Strikeouts: 374
- Stats at Baseball Reference

Teams
- As player: Pittsburgh Alleghenys (1890); Cincinnati Reds (1895, 1899–1903); As manager: Indianapolis Hoosiers/Newark Peppers (1914–1915)

Career highlights and awards
- Federal League champion (1914)

William Corcoran Phillips (November 9, 1868 – October 25, 1941), nicknamed "Whoa Bill" or "Silver Bill", was an American right-handed pitcher and manager in Major League Baseball.

== Biography ==
Phillips was born in Allenport, Pennsylvania on November 9, 1868. At the age of twenty-one, Phillips broke into the big leagues on August 11, 1890, playing his first ten games for the Pittsburgh Alleghenys. Five days later, on August 16, 1890, Phillips, pitching against the Chicago Colts, gave up two grand slam home runs in the same inning.

As a player, he pitched for seven seasons in the majors.

In 1895, he came back to play eighteen more games for the Cincinnati Reds. In 1899, he went 17–9 on a team that featured nineteen-year-old rookie Sam Crawford and manager Buck Ewing. Phillips played for the Reds from 1899 to 1903, playing his last game on September 22. In a game against the Reds in 1900, Phillips punched Roy Thomas after Thomas fouled off twelve pitches in a single at-bat in the eighth inning.

Phillips managed the 1914 Indianapolis Hoosiers to the Federal League pennant. His top hitter was Benny Kauff and the top pitcher was Cy Falkenberg. Later he and Bill McKechnie managed the Newark Pepper, finishing the 1915 season fifth in the Federal League.

== Death and interment ==
Phillips died at the age of seventy-two in Charleroi, Pennsylvania on October 25, 1941, and was buried in the Mount Auburn Cemetery in Fayette City, Pennsylvania.
