= Len Swormstedt =

American baseball player (1878–1964)

- Pitcher
- Born: October 6, 1878; Cincinnati, Ohio, U.S.
- Died: July 19, 1964 (aged 85); Salem, Massachusetts, U.S.
- Batted: Right Threw: Right

MLB debut
- September 29, 1901, for the Cincinnati Reds

Last MLB appearance
- October 6, 1906, for the Boston Americans

MLB statistics
- Win–loss record: 3–4
- Earned run average: 2.22
- Strikeouts: 22
- Stats at Baseball Reference

Teams
- Cincinnati Reds (1901–1902); Boston Americans (1906)

Leonard Brodbeck Swormstedt (October 6, 1878 – July 19, 1964) was an American starting pitcher in Major League Baseball who played between 1901 and 1906 for the Cincinnati Reds (1901–1902) and Boston Americans (1906). Swormstedt batted and threw right-handed. He was born in Cincinnati, Ohio.

In a three-season career, Swormstedt posted a 3–4 record with 22 strikeouts a 2.22 ERA in eight appearances, including seven complete games, 10 walks, 58 hits allowed, and 65.0 innings of work.

Swormstedt died at the age of 85 in Salem, Massachusetts.
