= Bid McPhee =

American baseball player (1859–1943)

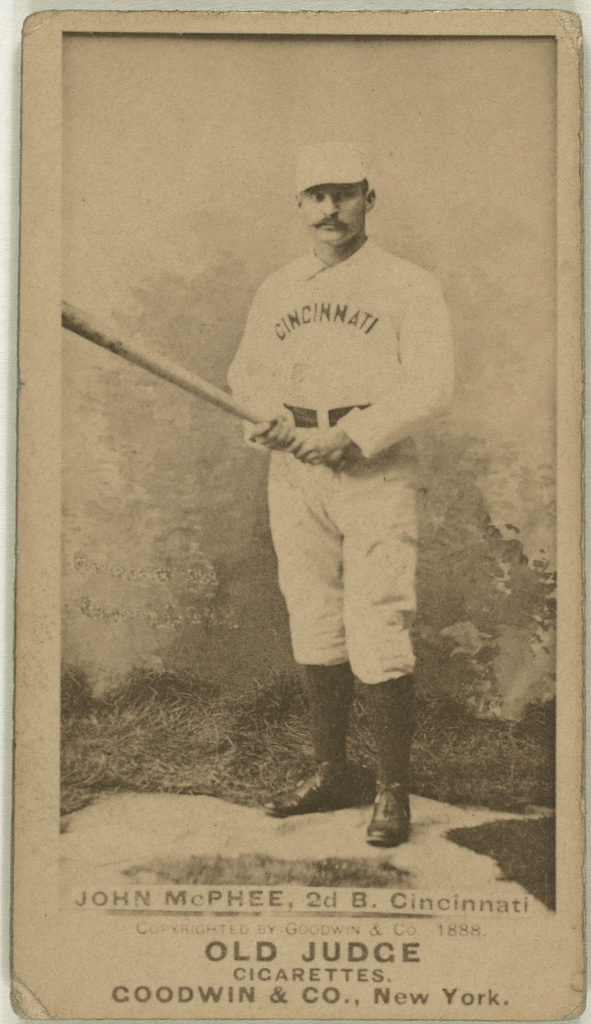
- McPhee in 1888
- Second baseman
- Born: November 1, 1859; Massena, New York, U.S.
- Died: January 3, 1943 (aged 83); San Diego, California, U.S.
- Batted: Right Threw: Right

MLB debut
- May 2, 1882, for the Cincinnati Red Stockings

Last MLB appearance
- October 15, 1899, for the Cincinnati Reds

MLB statistics
- Batting average: .272
- Hits: 2,258
- Home runs: 53
- Runs batted in: 1,072
- Stolen bases: 568
- Managerial record: 79–124
- Winning %: .389
- Stats at Baseball Reference

Teams
- As player: Cincinnati Red Stockings / Reds (1882–1899); As manager: Cincinnati Reds (1901–1902)

Career highlights and awards
- AA home run leader (1886); Cincinnati Reds Hall of Fame

Member of the National

Baseball Hall of Fame
- Induction: 2000
- Election method: Veterans Committee

John Alexander "Bid" McPhee (November 1, 1859 – January 3, 1943) was an American 19th-century Major League Baseball second baseman. He played 18 seasons in the majors, from 1882 until 1899, all for the Cincinnati Reds franchise. He was elected to the Baseball Hall of Fame in 2000. Known more for his fielding than his hitting, McPhee was the last second baseman to play without a glove.

== Early career ==
Born in Massena, New York, McPhee broke into professional baseball in 1877 as a catcher with the Davenport Brown Stockings of the Northwestern League. He played for Davenport for three seasons, shifting to second base during the 1879 season. After not playing baseball in 1880, he joined an independent team in Akron, Ohio in 1881. Before the 1882 season, he signed a contract to play for the Cincinnati Red Stockings, a team in the newly formed American Association.

== Major League Baseball career ==
Making his major league debut on May 2, 1882, the 22-year-old McPhee had a batting average of just .228, but he led the league in several fielding categories, including putouts and fielding percentage. With McPhee in the lineup for 78 out of their 80 games, the Red Stockings won the inaugural AA championship. McPhee was the only starting second baseman Cincinnati had for the first 18 seasons of its existence, accompanying the team to the National League in 1890, when they became the Cincinnati Reds. In last two seasons of his career, he was the oldest player in the major leagues.

Over 18 years, McPhee batted .272, hit 53 home runs, hit 189 triples, scored 1,684 runs, had 1,072 runs batted in, and stole 568 bases (this number however is noted by the fact that statistics for McPhee's first four seasons did not include stolen bases, and from 1886 until 1898, the American Association counted stolen bases if a runner happened to go from first base to third base on a single or advanced a base on an out). He had ten 100-plus seasons in runs scored and regularly led the league in many defensive categories despite playing without a glove for the first 14 years of his career. Without the benefit of the padding provided by fielding gloves, McPhee toughened his hands by soaking them in salt water.

Shortly after retiring as a player in 1899, McPhee rejoined the Reds as a manager. At the team's helm for 1901 and part of 1902, he posted 79 wins and 124 losses for a .389 winning percentage.

== Death and honors ==
McPhee died in 1943. He was cremated and his ashes were interred in the mausoleum at Cypress View Memorial Gardens in San Diego, California.

McPhee was inducted into the Baseball Hall of Fame in 2000, more than 100 years after he played in his last major league game. He is the only Hall of Famer to spend significant time in the American Association. He is one of three Baseball Hall of Famers, along with Johnny Bench and Barry Larkin, who played their entire career in Cincinnati. McPhee is also the only Hall of Famer from the 1882 pennant-winning Cincinnati Red Stockings team.

Two years after his induction into the Baseball Hall of Fame, McPhee was inducted into the Cincinnati Reds Hall of Fame.

== See also ==
- List of Major League Baseball career hits leaders
- List of Major League Baseball career triples leaders
- List of Major League Baseball career runs scored leaders
- List of Major League Baseball career runs batted in leaders
- List of Major League Baseball career stolen bases leaders
- List of Major League Baseball annual home run leaders
- List of Major League Baseball annual triples leaders
- List of Major League Baseball triples records
- List of Major League Baseball players to hit for the cycle
- List of Major League Baseball players who spent their entire career with one franchise

Achievements
Preceded by Harry Stovey	American Association Home Run Champion; 1886	Succeeded by Tip O'Neill
Preceded by Dave Orr	Hitting for the cycle August 26, 1887	Succeeded by Harry Stovey
