= Noodles Hahn =

American baseball player (1879–1960)

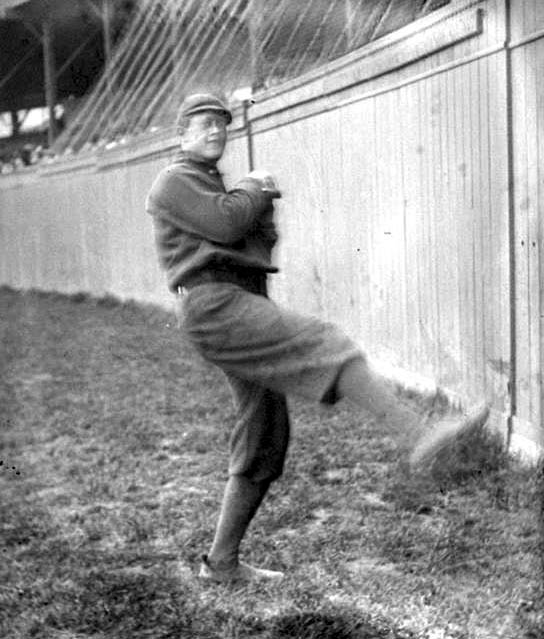
- Pitcher
- Born: April 29, 1879; Nashville, Tennessee, U.S.
- Died: February 6, 1960 (aged 80); Candler, North Carolina, U.S.
- Batted: Left Threw: Left

MLB debut
- April 18, 1899, for the Cincinnati Reds

Last MLB appearance
- June 7, 1906, for the New York Highlanders

MLB statistics
- Win–loss record: 130–94
- Earned run average: 2.55
- Strikeouts: 917
- Stats at Baseball Reference

Teams
- Cincinnati Reds (1899–1905); New York Highlanders (1906)

Career highlights and awards
- 3× NL strikeout leader (1899–1901); Pitched a no-hitter on July 12, 1900; Cincinnati Reds Hall of Fame

Frank George "Noodles" Hahn (April 29, 1879 – February 6, 1960) was an American starting pitcher in Major League Baseball (MLB) who played between 1899 and 1906, primarily for the Cincinnati Reds. The left-hander posted a 130–94 win–loss record with 917 strikeouts and a 2.55 earned run average in 2,029 1/3 innings pitched. He threw the first major league no-hitter of the 20th century.

Hahn completed veterinary school while playing for Cincinnati, and he entered the profession after he retired from baseball. He worked out with the Reds on game days until he was almost 70 years old.

== Biography ==
=== Early life ===
Hahn was born in Nashville, Tennessee. Hahn acquired his nickname as a child, but said that he did not know how he had gotten it. Hahn's biography from the Society for American Baseball Research suggests four possible origins for the nickname, all involving the fact that Hahn had frequently carried, sold or enjoyed noodle soup. Before he turned 15 years old, he signed a contract for $35 per month with a team in Clarksville, Tennessee. Hahn later talked about having to wait outside of saloons as his teammates went in for drinks. He moved on to the Southern League before reaching the major leagues with the Cincinnati Reds at the age of 20.

=== MLB career ===
During his first MLB season, Hahn threw a one-hit game to defeat the Louisville Colonels. Though not armed with a powerful fastball, Hahn developed a reputation as a strikeout pitcher. Long after Hahn's retirement, sportswriter Grantland Rice described Hahn's pitching style. "Hahn was a left hander who belonged to the Herb Pennock, Eddie Plank school. He lacked the blazing speed of a Grove or a Rube Waddell, but he could tie up batters into more knots than 10 sailors could untie in a week. And you could see the seams on the ball as it came floating up", Rice wrote.

By 1900, Hahn was beginning to look at careers beyond baseball. Though his friends had urged him to develop his talent for piano, Hahn wanted to pursue the study of electricity. He made plans to work for a large Memphis electrical company in the offseason following the 1900 season. He pitched the final no-hitter of the 19th century, and the first no-hitter of the 1900s, on July 12, 1900 against the Philadelphia Phillies. The day after being shut down by Hahn, the Phillies scored the most runs the team posted all year, defeating Pittsburgh 23–8. Hahn led the NL in shutouts that season.

In 1901, Hahn recorded 22 wins but Cincinnati finished in last place. He was the first NL pitcher to win 20 or more games with an eighth-place team. Winning 22 of his team's 52 victories, Hahn accounted for the highest percentage of a team's victories until Steve Carlton won 27 of the 59 games that the Philadelphia Phillies won in 1972. He led the league in innings pitched that season and was the league's strikeout leader for the third consecutive season. In a 1901 game, Hahn struck out 16 batters, the highest single-game total in any major league since 1887.

In February 1903, Hahn was a student at Cincinnati Veterinary College. Asked how long he planned to play baseball, he replied that he would like to play a few more seasons. Hahn had given up beer and liquor over the winter and said that he felt good going into the season, but he entertained the possibility that the coming year could be his last. Hahn planned to finish school the next winter and had thoughts of completing postgraduate work and taking a trip to Germany before beginning veterinary practice. In 1904, Hahn turned down an offer to become the city veterinarian for Dallas, Texas and remained with Cincinnati.

During the 1905 season, Cincinnati manager Joe Kelley announced that the team was searching for a left-handed pitcher who could replace Hahn. Kelley said, "While we have not lost confidence in Hahn, we realize that he can't last forever... he has already passed the limit that usually is fixed for southpaws in fast company, about five or six years at the most."

=== Retirement and later life ===
Hahn retired in 1906 due to arm trouble. Using his education as a veterinary surgeon, he took a position as a government meat inspector in Cincinnati. An Ohio newspaper stated in July 1908 that Hahn had pitched well in semipro baseball and that he would soon be back with the Reds. In 1909, another newspaper report indicated that Hahn had sought medical attention for the arm issue and that he would attempt a major league comeback. By 1910, Hahn was giving private instruction to pitching prospect Rube Benton, who Cincinnati had signed to a $6,000 contract.

After his retirement from baseball, Hahn continued to work out with the Reds on game days until he was at least 68 years old. Author Lee Allen wrote that the members of a Reds team in the 1940s did not know that Hahn had been a successful Reds pitcher until one of the players found an old newspaper clipping about him. Allen said that Hahn was "never one to get a rookie off in a corner and tell him how baseball used to be played or should be played. He was never a mine of misinformation about the game, and was even reluctant to discuss his own career." He died in Candler, North Carolina at the age of 80. He was inducted into the Cincinnati Reds Hall of Fame in 1963.

== See also ==
- List of Major League Baseball annual strikeout leaders
- List of Major League Baseball no-hitters

Achievements
Preceded by Vic Willis	No-hitter pitcher July 12, 1900	Succeeded by Christy Mathewson
