= 1901 New York Giants season =

1901 New York Giants
- League: National League
- Ballpark: Polo Grounds
- City: New York City
- Record: 52–85 (.380)
- League place: 7th
- Owners: Andrew Freedman
- Managers: George Davis

The 1901 New York Giants season was the franchise's 19th season. The team finished in seventh place in the National League with a 52–85 record, 37 games behind the Pittsburgh Pirates.

== Regular season ==
=== Season standings ===
National League
Team	W	L	Pct.	GB	Home	Road
Pittsburgh Pirates	90	49	.647	—	45‍–‍24	45‍–‍25
Philadelphia Phillies	83	57	.593	7½	46‍–‍23	37‍–‍34
Brooklyn Superbas	79	57	.581	9½	43‍–‍25	36‍–‍32
St. Louis Cardinals	76	64	.543	14½	40‍–‍31	36‍–‍33
Boston Beaneaters	69	69	.500	20½	41‍–‍29	28‍–‍40
Chicago Orphans	53	86	.381	37	30‍–‍39	23‍–‍47
New York Giants	52	85	.380	37	30‍–‍38	22‍–‍47
Cincinnati Reds	52	87	.374	38	27‍–‍43	25‍–‍44

=== Record vs. opponents ===
1901 National League record Sources:
Team	BSN	BRO	CHC	CIN	NYG	PHI	PIT	STL
Boston	—	10–10	13–6	11–8–1	14–6–1	7–13	5–15	9–11
Brooklyn	10–10	—	13–7	14–6–1	11–6	11–9	11–8	9–11
Chicago	6–13	7–13	—	10–10	11–9–1	3–17	6–14	10–10
Cincinnati	8–11–1	6–14–1	10–10	—	8–12	4–16	7–13	9–11–1
New York	6–14–1	6–11	9–11–1	12–8	—	8–12	4–16–1	7–13–1
Philadelphia	13–7	9–11	17–3	16–4	12–8	—	7–13	9–11
Pittsburgh	15–5	8–11	14–6	13–7	16–4–1	13–7	—	11–9
St. Louis	11–9	11–9	10–10	11–9–1	13–7–1	11–9	9–11	—

=== Roster ===
1901 New York Giants
Roster
Pitchers: Dummy Deegan; Roger Denzer; Ed Doheny; Harry Felix; Chauncey Fisher; Larry Hesterfer; Dummy Leitner; Jake Livingstone; Bill Magee; Christy Mathewson; Al Maul; Willie Mills; Bill Phyle; Dummy Taylor; Ike Van Zandt	Catchers: Frank Bowerman; Aleck Smith; Joe Wall; Jack Warner; Infielders: Charlie Buelow; George Davis; John Ganzel; Jim Miller; Danny Murphy; Frank Murphy; Ray Nelson; Heinie Smith; Sammy Strang	Outfielders: Curt Bernard; Charlie Hickman; Jim Jones; Algie McBride; Kip Selbach; George Van Haltren	Manager: George Davis

== Player stats ==
=== Batting ===
==== Starters by position ====
Note: Pos = Position; G = Games played; AB = At bats; H = Hits; Avg. = Batting average; HR = Home runs; RBI = Runs batted in

Pos	Player	G	AB	H	Avg.	HR	RBI
C	Jack Warner	87	291	70	.241	0	20
1B	John Ganzel	138	526	113	.215	2	66
2B	Ray Nelson	39	130	26	.200	0	7
SS	George Davis	130	491	148	.301	7	65
3B	Sammy Strang	135	493	139	.282	1	34
OF	Kip Selbach	125	502	145	.289	1	56
OF	Algie McBride	68	264	74	.280	2	29
OF	George Van Haltren	135	543	182	.335	1	47

==== Other batters ====
Note: G = Games played; AB = At bats; H = Hits; Avg. = Batting average; HR = Home runs; RBI = Runs batted in

Player	G	AB	H	Avg.	HR	RBI
Charlie Hickman	112	406	113	.278	4	62
Frank Bowerman	59	191	38	.199	0	14
Frank Murphy	35	130	21	.162	0	8
Jim Jones	21	91	19	.209	0	5
Aleck Smith	26	78	11	.141	0	6
Curt Bernard	23	76	17	.224	0	6
Charlie Buelow	22	72	8	.111	0	4
Jim Miller	18	58	8	.138	0	3
Heinie Smith	9	29	6	.207	1	4
Danny Murphy	5	20	4	.200	0	0
Joe Wall	4	8	4	.500	0	1

=== Pitching ===
==== Starting pitchers ====
Note: G = Games pitched; IP = Innings pitched; W = Wins; L = Losses; ERA = Earned run average; SO = Strikeouts

Player	G	IP	W	L	ERA	SO
Luther Taylor	45	353.1	18	27	3.18	136
Christy Mathewson	40	336.0	20	17	2.41	221
Bill Phyle	24	168.2	7	10	4.27	62
Charlie Hickman	9	65.0	3	5	4.57	11
Roger Denzer	11	61.2	2	6	3.36	22
Bill Magee	6	42.1	0	4	5.95	14
Al Maul	3	19.0	0	3	11.37	5
George Leitner	2	18.0	0	2	4.50	3
Willie Mills	2	16.0	0	2	8.44	3
Larry Hesterfer	1	6.0	0	1	7.50	2
Jim Jones	1	5.0	0	1	10.80	3
Chauncey Fisher	1	4.0	0	0	15.75	1

==== Other pitchers ====
Note: G = Games pitched; IP = Innings pitched; W = Wins; L = Losses; ERA = Earned run average; SO = Strikeouts

Player	G	IP	W	L	ERA	SO
Ed Doheny	10	74.0	2	5	4.50	36
Dummy Deegan	2	17.0	0	1	6.35	8
Heinie Smith	2	13.1	0	1	8.10	5

==== Relief pitchers ====
Note: G = Games pitched; W = Wins; L = Losses; SV = Saves; ERA = Earned run average; SO = Strikeouts

Player	G	W	L	SV	ERA	SO
Ike Van Zandt	2	0	0	0	7.11	2
Jake Livingstone	2	0	0	0	9.00	6
George Van Haltren	1	0	0	0	3.00	2
Harry Felix	1	0	0	0	0.00	0
