= 1901 Boston Beaneaters season =

1901 Boston Beaneaters
- League: National League
- Ballpark: South End Grounds
- City: Boston, Massachusetts
- Record: 69–69 (.500)
- League place: 5th
- Owners: Arthur Soden
- Managers: Frank Selee

The 1901 Boston Beaneaters season was the 31st season of the franchise. The Beaneaters finished fifth in the National League with a record of 69–69.

== Regular season ==
=== Season standings ===
National League
Team	W	L	Pct.	GB	Home	Road
Pittsburgh Pirates	90	49	.647	—	45‍–‍24	45‍–‍25
Philadelphia Phillies	83	57	.593	7½	46‍–‍23	37‍–‍34
Brooklyn Superbas	79	57	.581	9½	43‍–‍25	36‍–‍32
St. Louis Cardinals	76	64	.543	14½	40‍–‍31	36‍–‍33
Boston Beaneaters	69	69	.500	20½	41‍–‍29	28‍–‍40
Chicago Orphans	53	86	.381	37	30‍–‍39	23‍–‍47
New York Giants	52	85	.380	37	30‍–‍38	22‍–‍47
Cincinnati Reds	52	87	.374	38	27‍–‍43	25‍–‍44

=== Record vs. opponents ===
1901 National League record Sources:
Team	BSN	BRO	CHC	CIN	NYG	PHI	PIT	STL
Boston	—	10–10	13–6	11–8–1	14–6–1	7–13	5–15	9–11
Brooklyn	10–10	—	13–7	14–6–1	11–6	11–9	11–8	9–11
Chicago	6–13	7–13	—	10–10	11–9–1	3–17	6–14	10–10
Cincinnati	8–11–1	6–14–1	10–10	—	8–12	4–16	7–13	9–11–1
New York	6–14–1	6–11	9–11–1	12–8	—	8–12	4–16–1	7–13–1
Philadelphia	13–7	9–11	17–3	16–4	12–8	—	7–13	9–11
Pittsburgh	15–5	8–11	14–6	13–7	16–4–1	13–7	—	11–9
St. Louis	11–9	11–9	10–10	11–9–1	13–7–1	11–9	9–11	—

=== Roster ===
1901 Boston Beaneaters
Roster
Pitchers: Bill Dinneen; Bob Lawson; Kid Nichols; Togie Pittinger; Vic Willis	Catchers: Malachi Kittridge; Pat Moran; Infielders: Gene DeMontreville; John Hinton; Herman Long; Bobby Lowe; Fred Tenney	Outfielders: Shad Barry; Fred Brown; Pat Carney; Duff Cooley; Fred Crolius; Daff Gammons; George Grosart; Billy Hamilton; Billy Lush; Frank Murphy; Joe Rickert; Jimmy Slagle; Mike Smith	Manager: Frank Selee

== Player stats ==
=== Batting ===
==== Starters by position ====
Note: Pos = Position; G = Games played; AB = At bats; H = Hits; Avg. = Batting average; HR = Home runs; RBI = Runs batted in

Pos	Player	G	AB	H	Avg.	HR	RBI
C	Malachi Kittridge	114	381	96	.252	2	40
1B	Fred Tenney	115	451	127	.282	1	22
2B	Gene DeMontreville	140	577	173	.300	5	72
SS	Herman Long	138	518	112	.216	3	68
3B	Bobby Lowe	129	491	125	.255	3	47
OF	Jimmy Slagle	66	255	69	.271	0	7
OF	Billy Hamilton	102	348	100	.287	3	38
OF	Duff Cooley	63	240	62	.258	0	27

==== Other batters ====
Note: G = Games played; AB = At bats; H = Hits; Avg. = Batting average; HR = Home runs; RBI = Runs batted in

Player	G	AB	H	Avg.	HR	RBI
Fred Crolius	49	200	48	.240	1	13
Pat Moran	52	180	38	.211	2	18
Frank Murphy	45	176	46	.261	1	18
Daff Gammons	28	93	18	.194	0	10
Joe Rickert	13	60	10	.167	0	1
Mike Smith	16	57	10	.175	0	3
Pat Carney	13	55	16	.291	0	6
Shad Barry	11	40	7	.175	0	6
Bob Lawson	10	27	4	.148	1	4
Billy Lush	7	27	5	.185	0	3
George Grosart	7	26	3	.115	0	1
Fred Brown	7	14	2	.143	0	2
John Hinton	4	13	1	.077	0	0

=== Pitching ===
==== Starting pitchers ====
Note: G = Games pitched; IP = Innings pitched; W = Wins; L = Losses; ERA = Earned run average; SO = Strikeouts

Player	G	IP	W	L	ERA	SO
Kid Nichols	38	321.0	19	16	3.22	143
Bill Dinneen	37	309.1	15	18	2.94	141
Vic Willis	38	305.1	20	17	2.36	133
Togie Pittinger	34	281.1	13	16	3.01	129

==== Other pitchers ====
Note: G = Games pitched; IP = Innings pitched; W = Wins; L = Losses; ERA = Earned run average; SO = Strikeouts

Player	G	IP	W	L	ERA	SO
Bob Lawson	6	46.0	2	2	3.33	12
