= 1901 Brooklyn Superbas season =

1901 Brooklyn Superbas
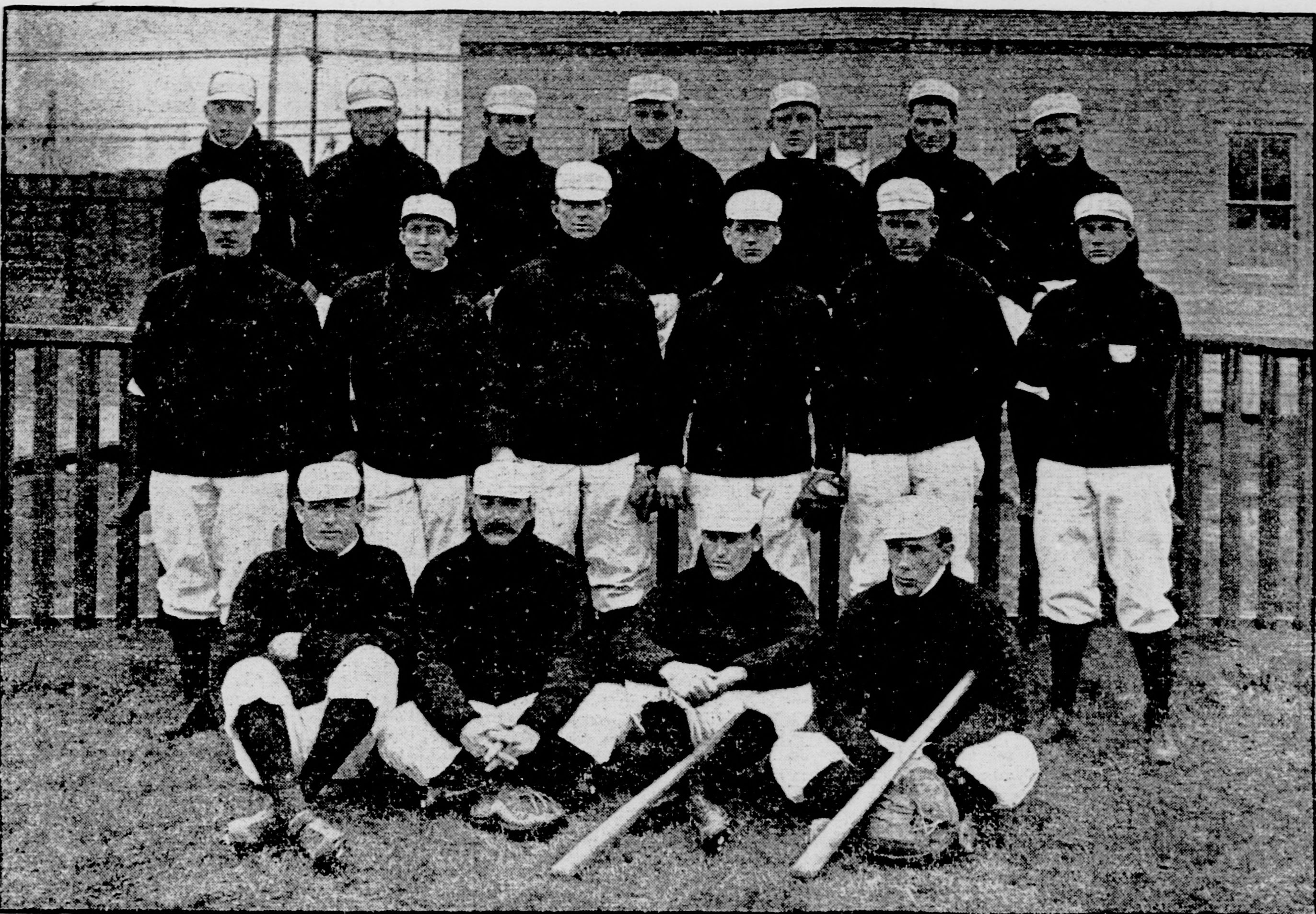
- League: National League
- Ballpark: Washington Park
- City: Brooklyn, New York
- Record: 79–57 (.581)
- League place: 3rd
- Owners: Charles Ebbets, Ferdinand Abell, Harry Von der Horst, Ned Hanlon
- President: Charles Ebbets
- Managers: Ned Hanlon

The 1901 Brooklyn Superbas lost several players to the newly official major league, the American League. The Superbas finished third in the National League with a record of 79–57.

== Offseason ==
- February 1901: Gene DeMontreville was purchased from the Superbas by the Boston Beaneaters.

== Regular season ==
=== Season standings ===
National League
Team	W	L	Pct.	GB	Home	Road
Pittsburgh Pirates	90	49	.647	—	45‍–‍24	45‍–‍25
Philadelphia Phillies	83	57	.593	7½	46‍–‍23	37‍–‍34
Brooklyn Superbas	79	57	.581	9½	43‍–‍25	36‍–‍32
St. Louis Cardinals	76	64	.543	14½	40‍–‍31	36‍–‍33
Boston Beaneaters	69	69	.500	20½	41‍–‍29	28‍–‍40
Chicago Orphans	53	86	.381	37	30‍–‍39	23‍–‍47
New York Giants	52	85	.380	37	30‍–‍38	22‍–‍47
Cincinnati Reds	52	87	.374	38	27‍–‍43	25‍–‍44

=== Record vs. opponents ===
1901 National League record Sources:
Team	BSN	BRO	CHC	CIN	NYG	PHI	PIT	STL
Boston	—	10–10	13–6	11–8–1	14–6–1	7–13	5–15	9–11
Brooklyn	10–10	—	13–7	14–6–1	11–6	11–9	11–8	9–11
Chicago	6–13	7–13	—	10–10	11–9–1	3–17	6–14	10–10
Cincinnati	8–11–1	6–14–1	10–10	—	8–12	4–16	7–13	9–11–1
New York	6–14–1	6–11	9–11–1	12–8	—	8–12	4–16–1	7–13–1
Philadelphia	13–7	9–11	17–3	16–4	12–8	—	7–13	9–11
Pittsburgh	15–5	8–11	14–6	13–7	16–4–1	13–7	—	11–9
St. Louis	11–9	11–9	10–10	11–9–1	13–7–1	11–9	9–11	—

=== Notable transactions ===
- June 17, 1901: Cozy Dolan was purchased by the Superbas from the Chicago Orphans.
- June 19, 1901: Lefty Davis was released by the Superbas.
- June 20, 1901: Hughie Jennings was purchased from the Superbas by the Philadelphia Phillies.

=== Roster ===
1901 Brooklyn Superbas
Roster
Pitchers: Kid Carsey; Bill Donovan; Jay Hughes; Brickyard Kennedy; Frank Kitson; Gene McCann; Doc McJames; Doc Newton; Gene Wright	Catchers: Duke Farrell; Hughie Hearne; Deacon McGuire; Farmer Steelman; Infielders: Bill Dahlen; Tom Daly; Frank Gatins; John Gochnaur; Charlie Irwin; Joe Kelley	Outfielders: Lefty Davis; Cozy Dolan; Willie Keeler; Tom McCreery; Jimmy Sheckard	Manager: Ned Hanlon

== Player stats ==
=== Batting ===
==== Starters by position ====
Note: Pos = Position; G = Games played; AB = At bats; R = Runs; H = Hits; Avg. = Batting average; HR = Home runs; RBI = Runs batted in; SB = Stolen bases

Pos	Player	G	AB	R	H	Avg.	HR	RBI	SB
C	Deacon McGuire	85	301	28	89	.296	0	40	4
1B	Joe Kelley	120	492	77	151	.307	4	65	18
2B	Tom Daly	133	520	88	164	.315	3	90	31
3B	Charlie Irwin	65	242	25	52	.215	0	20	4
SS	Bill Dahlen	131	511	69	136	.266	4	82	23
OF	Willie Keeler	136	595	123	202	.339	2	43	23
OF	Jimmy Sheckard	133	554	116	196	.354	11	104	35
OF	Tom McCreery	91	335	47	97	.290	3	53	13

==== Other batters ====
Note: G = Games played; AB = At bats; R = Runs; H = Hits; Avg. = Batting average; HR = Home runs; RBI = Runs batted in; SB = Stolen bases

Player	G	AB	R	H	Avg.	HR	RBI	SB
Duke Farrell	80	284	38	84	.296	1	31	7
Cozy Dolan	66	253	33	66	.261	0	29	7
Frank Gatins	50	197	21	45	.228	1	21	6
Lefty Davis	25	91	11	19	.209	0	7	4
John Gochnaur	3	11	1	4	.364	0	2	1
Hughie Hearne	2	5	1	2	.400	0	3	0
Farmer Steelman	1	3	0	1	.333	0	0	0

=== Pitching ===
==== Starting pitchers ====
Note: G = Games pitched; GS = Games started; CG = Complete games; IP = Innings pitched; W = Wins; L = Losses; ERA = Earned run average; BB = Bases on balls; SO = Strikeouts

Player	G	GS	CG	IP	W	L	ERA	BB	SO
Bill Donovan	45	38	36	351.0	25	15	2.77	152	226
Frank Kitson	38	32	26	280.2	19	11	2.98	67	127
Jay Hughes	31	29	24	250.2	17	12	3.27	102	96
Doc Newton	13	12	9	105.0	6	5	2.83	30	45
Doc McJames	13	12	6	91.0	5	6	4.75	40	42
Gene McCann	6	5	3	34.0	2	3	3.44	16	9
Gene Wright	1	1	1	9.0	1	0	1.00	1	6

==== Other pitchers ====
Note: G = Games pitched; GS = Games started; CG = Complete games; IP = Innings pitched; W = Wins; L = Losses; ERA = Earned run average; BB = Bases on balls; SO = Strikeouts

Player	G	GS	CG	IP	W	L	ERA	BB	SO
Brickyard Kennedy	14	8	6	85.1	3	5	3.06	24	28

==== Relief pitchers ====
Note: G = Games pitched; IP = Innings pitched; W = Wins; L = Losses; SV = Saves; ERA = Earned run average; BB = Bases on balls; SO = Strikeouts

Player	G	IP	W	L	SV	ERA	BB	SO
Kid Carsey	2	7.0	1	0	0	10.29	3	4
