= List of Brooklyn Dodgers Opening Day starting pitchers =

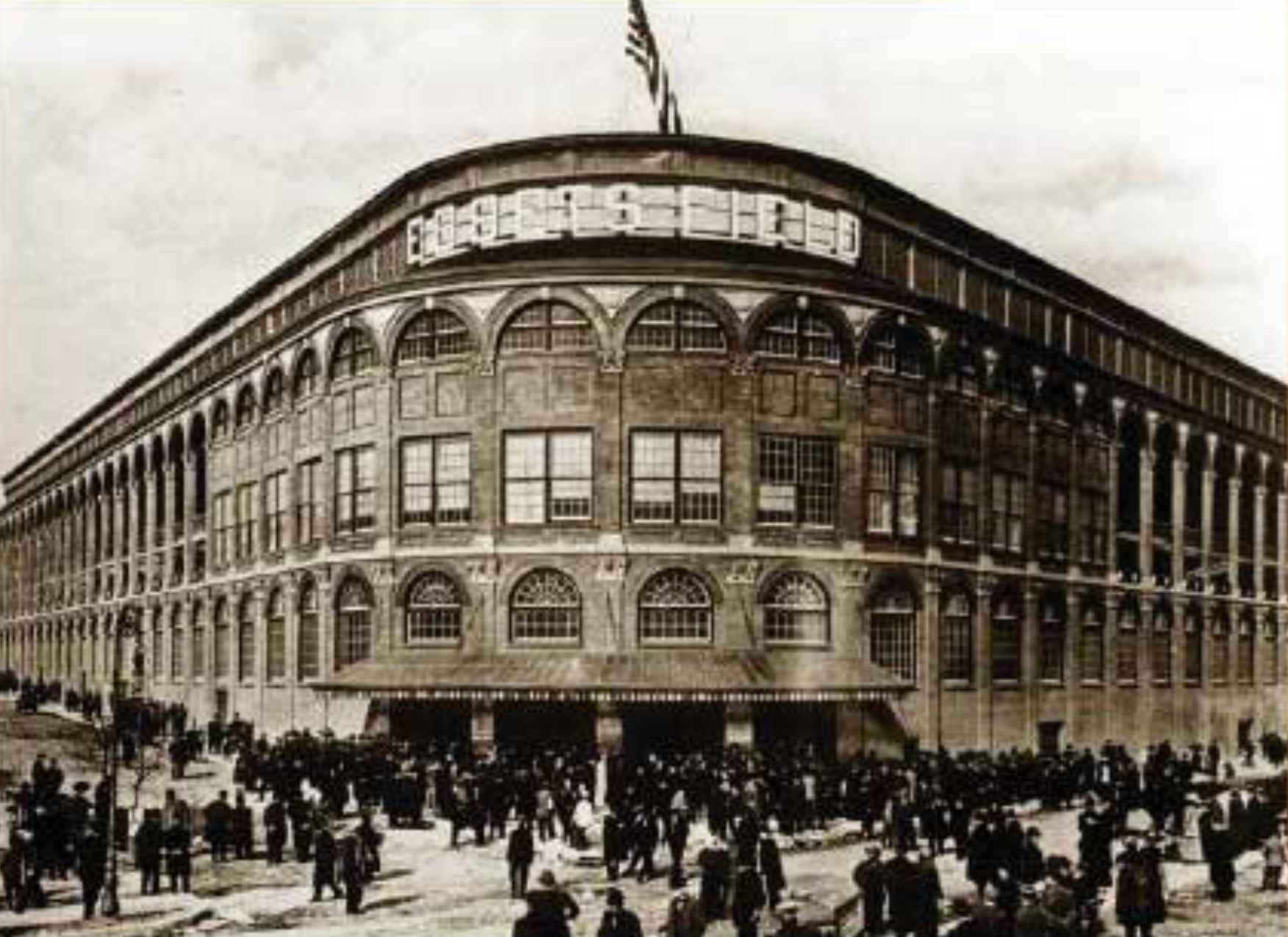
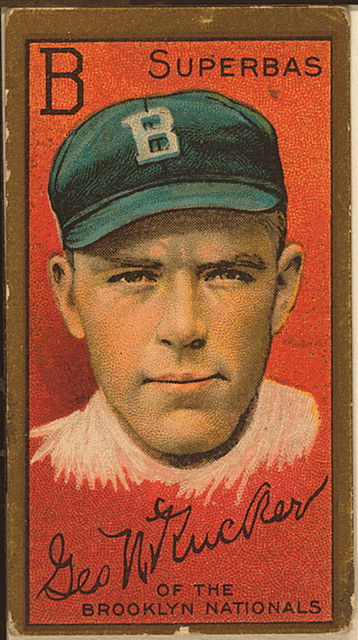
The newly constructed Ebbets Field on its first Opening Day, April 9, 1913. The Brooklyn Dodgers' starting pitcher was Nap Rucker (right), pictured on a 1911 baseball card, who was opening Brooklyn's season for his fifth and last time. The Dodgers lost 1–0 to the Philadelphia Phillies.

From their inception in 1884 through their last year in Brooklyn, 1957, the Brooklyn Dodgers (also known as the Trolley Dodgers, Grooms, Bridegrooms, Superbas, and Robins at various times in their history) used 41 different starting pitchers on Opening Day. Brickyard Kennedy made the most Opening Day starts for the Brooklyn Dodgers, with 6 such starts between 1894 and 1900. Nap Rucker made 5 such starts between 1907 and 1913. Carl Erskine made 4 Opening Day starts between 1951 and 1955 and Van Mungo also made 4 Opening Day starts between 1934 and 1938. Five Brooklyn pitchers made 3 Opening Day starts: Leon Cadore, Watty Clark, Don Newcombe, Jesse Petty, Dutch Ruether. The first game of the new baseball season for a team is played on Opening Day, and being named the Opening Day starter is an honor, which is often given to the player who is expected to lead the pitching staff that season, though there are various strategic reasons why a team's best pitcher might not start on Opening Day.

The Dodgers played in the modern World Series nine times before moving to Los Angeles, winning once in 1955, when Carl Esrkine was the Opening Day pitcher. Erskine was also the Opening Day pitcher in 1953 when they played in the World Series but lost to the New York Yankees. Joe Hatten also had two Opening Day starts in World Series years, 1947 and 1949. Other Opening Day starting pitchers in World Series years were Larry Cheney in 1916, Leon Cadore in 1920, Whit Wyatt in 1941, Preacher Roe in 1952, and Don Newcombe in 1956.

Prior to the existence of the modern World Series, the Dodgers won National League championships in 1890, 1899 and 1900. They also won an American Association championship in 1889, when the American Association was considered a Major League. They played in the 19th century version of the World Series in 1889 and 1890. Mickey Hughes was the Opening Day starting pitcher in 1889, Bob Caruthers was the Opening Day starting pitcher in 1890, and Kennedy was the Opening Day starting pitcher in 1899 and 1900.

Don Newcombe was the starting pitcher in 1956, the last Opening Day that the Dodgers played in their longtime home field, Ebbets Field. Newcombe was also the Opening Day starter on Opening Day of the 1957 season, the Dodgers last Opening Day before moving to Los Angeles. Nap Rucker was the Opening Day starting pitcher in the last Opening Day the team (then called the Trolley Dodgers) played at their previous home park, Washington Park, in 1912. Rucker was also the Opening Day pitcher in the first game at Ebbets Field in 1913.

Joe Hatten was the Opening Day starting pitcher in one of the most momentous games in baseball history. That was in 1947, the years of Jackie Robinson's first game in the Major Leagues, ending the racial segregation that had prevailed in Major League Baseball since before 1900. The Joe Hatten started and the Dodgers won Jackie Robinson's first major league game, beating the Boston Braves 5–3 at Ebbets Field.

== Key ==
Year	Each year is linked to an article about that particular Dodgers season.
W	Win
L	Loss
T	Tie Game; no decision to starting pitcher
ND (W)	No Decision by starting pitcher; Dodgers won game
ND (L)	No Decision by starting pitcher; Dodgers lost game
(W)	Dodgers won game; no information on starting pitcher's decision
(L)	Dodgers lost game; no information on starting pitcher's decision
(#)	Number of appearances as Opening Day starter
Location	Stadium in italics for home game
*	American Association champions
**	National League champions
#	World Series Champions

== Pitchers ==
Brickyard Kennedy was the Opening Day starting pitcher six times, more often than any other pitcher during the franchise's time in Brooklyn.

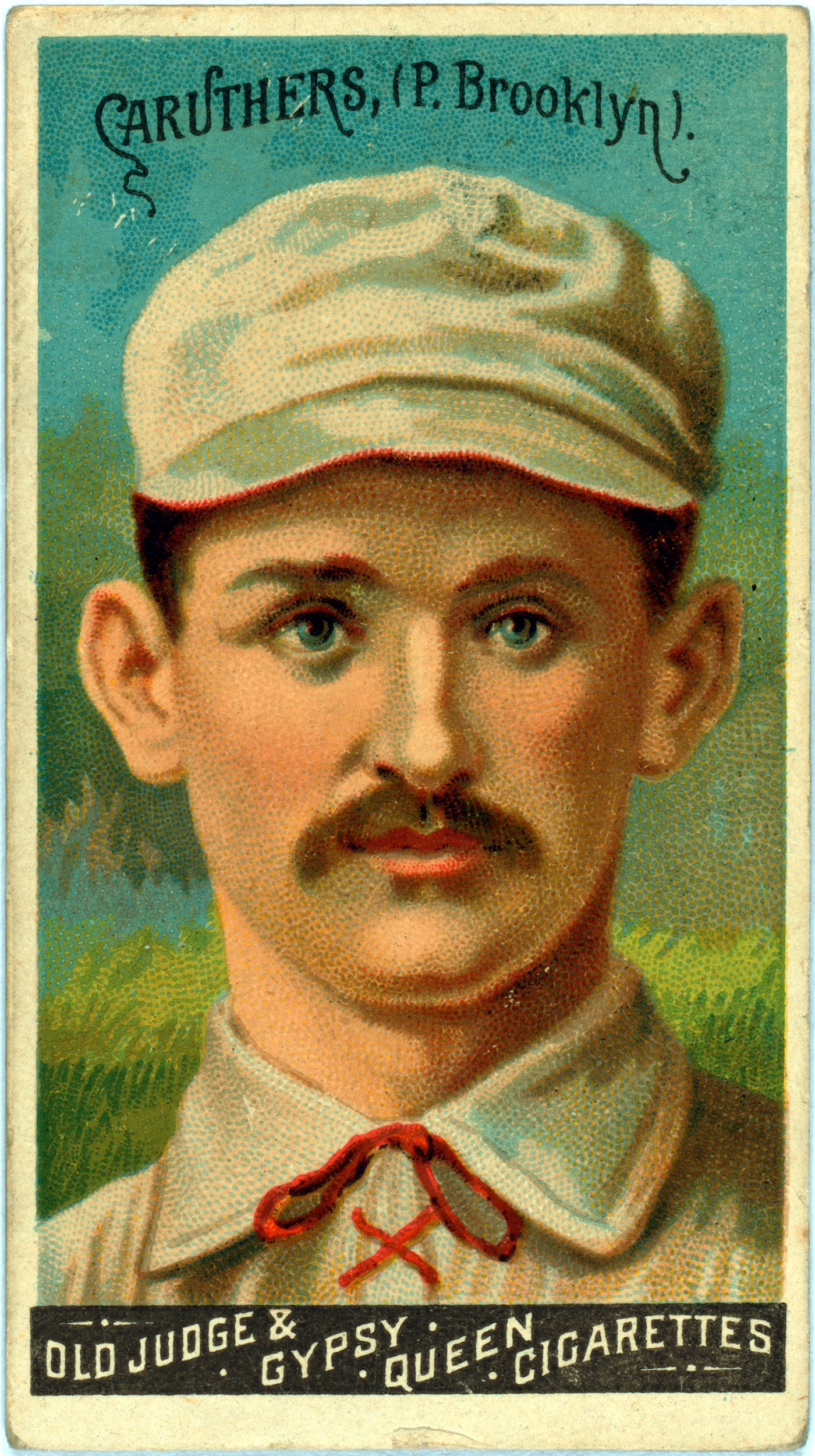
Bob Caruthers was Brooklyn's Opening Day starting pitcher in their first season in the National League, 1890, in which the team won the National League championship.

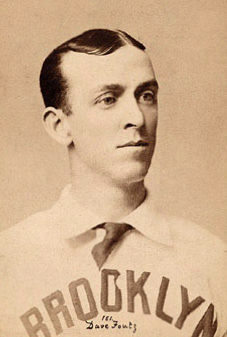
Dave Foutz was Brooklyn's Opening Day starting pitcher in 1892.

Hall of Famer Rube Marquard was Brooklyn's Opening Day starting pitcher in 1918.

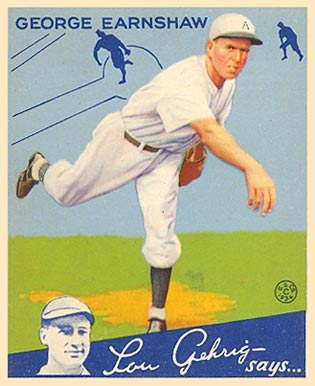
George Earnshaw was the Dodgers Opening Day starting pitcher in 1936.

Year	Pitcher	Decision	Opponent	Location	Reference
1884	Sam Kimber	(L)	Washington Statesmen	Athletic Park	
1885	John Harkins	(W)	Baltimore Orioles	Oriole Park	
1886	John Harkins (2)	(L)	Baltimore Orioles	Oriole Park	
1887	Henry Porter	(W)	New York Metropolitans	Washington Park	
1888	Bob Caruthers	(W)	Cleveland Blues	Washington Park	
1889*	Mickey Hughes	(L)	Philadelphia Athletics	Jefferson Street Grounds or Gloucester Point Grounds	
1890**	Bob Caruthers (2)	(L)	Boston Beaneaters	Congress Street Grounds	
1891	George Hemming	(W)	Philadelphia Phillies	Huntingdon Grounds	
1892	Dave Foutz	(W)	Baltimore Orioles	Union Park	
1893	Ed Stein	(L)	Philadelphia Phillies	Huntingdon Grounds	
1894	Brickyard Kennedy	(L)	Boston Beaneaters	South End Grounds	
1895	Brickyard Kennedy (2)	(W)	New York Giants	Polo Grounds	
1896	Brickyard Kennedy (3)	(W)	Baltimore Orioles	Union Park	
1897	Harley Payne	(W)	Washington Nationals	Boundary Field	
1898	Brickyard Kennedy (4)	(W)	Philadelphia Phillies	Baker Bowl	
1899**	Brickyard Kennedy (5)	(L)	Boston Beaneaters	Washington Park	
1900**	Brickyard Kennedy (6)	(W)	New York Giants	Polo Grounds	
1901	Bill Donovan	(W)	Philadelphia Phillies	Baker Bowl	
1902	Bill Donovan (2)	(W)	Boston Beaneaters	Washington Park	
1903	Henry Schmidt	(W)	New York Giants	Polo Grounds	
1904	Oscar Jones	(L)	New York Giants	Washington Park	
1905	Oscar Jones (2)	(L)	Philadelphia Phillies	Washington Park	
1906	Harry McIntire	(L)	Boston Beaneaters	Washington Park	
1907	Elmer Stricklett	(L)	Boston Doves	South End Grounds	
1908	Nap Rucker	(L)	Boston Doves	'Washington Park	
1909	Kaiser Wilhelm	(W)	New York Giants	Polo Grounds	
1910	Nap Rucker (2)	(W)	Philadelphia Phillies	Baker Bowl	
1911	Cy Barger	L	Boston Rustlers	South End Grounds	
1912	Nap Rucker (3)	L	New York Giants	Washington Park	
1913	Nap Rucker (4)	(L)	Philadelphia Phillies	Ebbets Field	
1914	Ed Reulbach	(W)	Boston Braves	Ebbets Field	
1915	Jeff Pfeffer	(L)	New York Giants	Polo Grounds	
1916**	Larry Cheney	(L)	Boston Braves	Ebbets Field	
1917	Wheezer Dell	(L)	Philadelphia Phillies	Ebbets Field	
1918	Rube Marquard	L	New York Giants	Polo Grounds	
1919	Leon Cadore	W	Boston Braves	Braves Field	
1920**	Leon Cadore (2)	W	Philadelphia Phillies	Ebbets Field	
1921	Leon Cadore (3)	ND (W)	Boston Braves	Braves Field	
1922	Dutch Ruether	W	New York Giants	Polo Grounds	
1923	Dutch Ruether (2)	T	Philadelphia Phillies	Ebbets Field	
1924	Dutch Ruether (3)	W	New York Giants	Polo Grounds	
1925	Dazzy Vance	W	Philadelphia Phillies	Ebbets Field	
1926	Jesse Petty	W	New York Giants	Polo Grounds	
1927	Jesse Petty (2)	W	Boston Braves	Braves Field	
1928	Jesse Petty (3)	L	Philadelphia Phillies	Ebbets Field	
1929	Watty Clark	L	Boston Braves	Braves Field	
1930	Watty Clark (2)	L	Philadelphia Phillies	Ebbets Field	
1931	Jack Quinn	L	Boston Braves	Braves Field	
1932	Waite Hoyt	L	Boston Braves	Ebbets Field	
1933	Watty Clark (3)	W	Philadelphia Phillies	Baker Bowl	
1934	Van Mungo	W	Boston Braves	Ebbets Field	
1935	Van Mungo (2)	W	Philadelphia Phillies	Baker Bowl	
1936	George Earnshaw	L	New York Giants	Ebbets Field	
1937	Van Mungo (3)	L	New York Giants	Ebbets Field	
1938	Van Mungo (4)	ND (W)	Philadelphia Phillies	Baker Bowl	
1939	Red Evans	L	New York Giants	Ebbets Field	
1940	Whit Wyatt	W	Boston Braves	Braves Field	
1941**	Whit Wyatt (2)	L	New York Giants	Ebbets Field	
1942	Curt Davis	W	New York Giants	Polo Grounds	
1943	Ed Head	W	New York Giants	Ebbets Field	
1944	Hal Gregg	L	Philadelphia Phillies	Shibe Park	
1945	Curt Davis (2)	W	Philadelphia Phillies	Ebbets Field	
1946	Hal Gregg (2)	L	Boston Braves	Braves Field	
1947**	Joe Hatten	ND (W)	Boston Braves	Ebbets Field	
1948	Rex Barney	ND (W)	New York Giants	Polo Grounds	
1949**	Joe Hatten (2)	W	New York Giants	Ebbets Field	
1950	Don Newcombe	L	Philadelphia Phillies	Shibe Park	
1951	Carl Erskine	L	Philadelphia Phillies	Ebbets Field	
1952**	Preacher Roe	W	Boston Braves	Braves Field	
1953**	Carl Erskine (2)	ND (W)	Pittsburgh Pirates	Ebbets Field	
1954	Carl Erskine (3)	L	New York Giants	Polo Grounds	
1955#	Carl Erskine (4)	W	Pittsburgh Pirates	Ebbets Field	
1956**	Don Newcombe (2)	L	Philadelphia Phillies	Ebbets Field	
1957	Don Newcombe (3)	ND (W)	Philadelphia Phillies	Connie Mack Stadium	
