= List of Major League Baseball players (He–Hi) =

The following is a list of Major League Baseball players, retired or active.

== He through Hi ==
Ed Head
Jerad Head
Ralph Head
Chase Headley
Tom Healey
Egyptian Healy
Fran Healy
Francis Healy
Thomas Healy
Charlie Heard
Jay Heard
Bunny Hearn (1910–20 P)
Bunny Hearn (1926–29 P)
Ed Hearn
Jim Hearn
Ed Hearne
Hughie Hearne
Jeff Hearron
Bill Heath
Jeff Heath
Kelly Heath
Mickey Heath
Mike Heath
Spencer Heath
Tommy Heath
Jeff Heathcock
Cliff Heathcote
Mike Heathcott
Neal Heaton
Dave Heaverlo
Wally Hebert
Richie Hebner
Bryan Hebson
Mike Hechinger
Guy Hecker
Harry Hedgpeth
Mike Hedlund
Danny Heep
Bert Heffernan
Bob Heffner
Don Heffner
Bronson Heflin
Randy Heflin
Jim Hegan|
Mike Hegan
Bob Hegman
Jake Hehl
Jack Heidemann
Emmet Heidrick
Frank Heifer
John Heileman
Aaron Heilman
Harry Heilmann β
Val Heim
Fred Heimach
Gorman Heimueller
Bud Heine
Don Heinkel
Chris Heintz
Ken Heintzelman
Tom Heintzelman
Jack Heinzman
Bob Heise
Clarence Heise
Jim Heise
Roy Heiser
Rick Heiserman
Chris Heisey
Crese Heismann
Al Heist
Harry Heitmann
Heinie Heitmuller
Mel Held
Woodie Held
Hank Helf
Eric Helfand
Ty Helfrich
Jeremy Hellickson
Rick Helling
Hellings (first name unknown)
Tony Hellman
Horace Helmbold
Tommy Helms
Wes Helms
Todd Helton
Heinie Heltzel
Russ Heman
Ed Hemingway
George Hemming
Scott Hemond
Ducky Hemp
Bret Hemphill
Charlie Hemphill
Frank Hemphill
Rollie Hemsley
Solly Hemus
Bernie Henderson
Bill Henderson
Dave Henderson
Ed Henderson
Hardie Henderson
Joe Henderson
Ken Henderson
Rickey Henderson β
Rod Henderson
Steve Henderson
Bob Hendley
George Hendrick
Harvey Hendrick
Ed Hendricks
Elrod Hendricks
Jack Hendricks
Ben Hendrickson
Don Hendrickson
Mark Hendrickson
Liam Hendriks
Claude Hendrix
Tim Hendryx
Dave Hengel
Moxie Hengel
Lafayette Henion
Tom Henke
Bob Henley
Gail Henley
Weldon Henley
Butch Henline
Sean Henn
Mike Henneman
Brad Hennessey
George Hennessey
Les Hennessy
Phil Hennigan
Pete Henning|
Rick Henninger
Randy Hennis
Bobby Henrich
Fritz Henrich
Tommy Henrich
Olaf Henriksen
Óscar Henríquez
Bill Henry (1952–69 P)
Bill Henry (1966 P)
Butch Henry
Doug Henry
Dutch Henry
Dwayne Henry
Earl Henry
George Henry
Jim Henry
John Henry (C)
John Henry (OF/P)
Ron Henry
Snake Henry
Roy Henshaw
Phil Hensiek
Chuck Hensley
Clay Hensley
Matt Hensley
Drew Henson
Pat Hentgen
Bill Hepler
Ron Herbel
Ernie Herbert
Fred Herbert
Ray Herbert
Félix Heredia
Gil Heredia
Ubaldo Heredia|
Wilson Heredia
Matt Herges
Art Herman
Babe Herman
Billy Herman β
Al Hermann
Chad Hermansen
Gene Hermanski
Dustin Hermanson
Jeremy Hermida
Remy Hermoso
Jesús Hernáiz
Adrián Hernández
Alex Hernández
Anderson Hernández
Carlos Hernández (C)
Carlos Hernández (IF)
Carlos Hernández (2000s P)
Carlos Hernández (2020s P)
César Hernández
Chico Hernández
David Hernandez
Diory Hernández
Enzo Hernández
Evelio Hernández
Félix Hernández
Fernando Hernández (1990s P)
Fernando Hernández (2000s P)
Jackie Hernández
Jeremy Hernandez
José Hernández
Keith Hernandez
Leo Hernández
Liván Hernández
Luis Hernández
Manny Hernández
Michel Hernández
Orlando Hernández
Pedro Hernández (P)
Pedro Hernández
Ramón Hernández (P)
Ramón Hernández (C)
Roberto Hernández
Rudy Hernández (P)
Rudy Hernández (SS)
Runelvys Hernández
Toby Hernández
Willie Hernández
Xavier Hernandez
Yoel Hernández
David Herndon
Junior Herndon
Larry Herndon
Tom Hernon
Joseph Herr
Tom Herr
Walt Herrell
Alex Herrera
Bobby Herrera
Daniel Herrera
Jonathan Herrera
José Herrera (1960s OF)
José Herrera (1990s OF)
Kelvin Herrera
Mike Herrera
Pancho Herrera
Yoslan Herrera
Troy Herriage
Tom Herrin
Art Herring
Bill Herring
Herb Herring
Lefty Herring
Ed Herrmann
Frank Herrmann
Leroy Herrmann
Marty Herrmann
John Herrnstein
Rick Herrscher
Earl Hersh
Mike Hershberger
Willard Hershberger
Frank Hershey
Orel Hershiser
Neal Hertweck
Steve Hertz
Buck Herzog
Whitey Herzog β
Joe Hesketh
Otto Hess
Tom Hess
George Hesselbacher
Mike Hessman
John Hester
Larry Hesterfer
Johnny Hetki
Gus Hetling
Eric Hetzel
George Heubel
Ed Heusser
Joe Heving
Johnnie Heving
Jake Hewitt
Greg Heydeman
Mike Heydon
Jason Heyward
Jack Hiatt
Phil Hiatt
Greg Hibbard
John Hibbard
Jim Hibbs
Bryan Hickerson
Eddie Hickey
Jack Hickey
Jim Hickey
Kevin Hickey
Mike Hickey
Charlie Hickman
Ernie Hickman
Jesse Hickman
Jim Hickman (1910s OF)
Jim Hickman (1960s OF)
Brandon Hicks
Buddy Hicks
Jim Hicks
Joe Hicks
Nat Hicks
Richard Hidalgo
Joe Hietpas
Kirby Higbe
Mahlon Higbee
Higby (first name unknown)
Bill Higdon
Irv Higginbotham
Bill Higgins
Bob Higgins
Dennis Higgins
Eddie Higgins
Kevin Higgins
Mark Higgins
Pinky Higgins
Bobby Higginson
Andy High
Charlie High
Ed High
Hugh High
Dick Higham
Teddy Higuera
John Hiland
Whitey Hilcher
George Hildebrand
Oral Hildebrand
Palmer Hildebrand
Tom Hilgendorf
Erik Hiljus
Aaron Hill
Belden Hill
Bill Hill
Bobby Hill
Carmen Hill
Cliff Hill
Dave Hill
Donnie Hill
Garry Hill
Glenallen Hill
Herbert Hill
Herman Hill
Hugh Hill
Hunter Hill
Jeremy Hill
Jesse Hill
Ken Hill
Koyie Hill
Marc Hill
Milt Hill
Oliver Hill
Rich Hill
Shawn Hill
Steven Hill
Homer Hillebrand
R.E. Hillebrand
Shawn Hillegas
Shea Hillenbrand
Chuck Hiller
Frank Hiller
Hob Hiller
John Hiller
Ed Hilley
Mack Hillis
Dave Hillman
Eric Hillman
Pat Hilly
Charlie Hilsey
Dave Hilton
Howard Hilton
Jack Himes
A. J. Hinch
Brett Hinchliffe
Bill Hinchman
Harry Hinchman
Mike Hinckley
Sam Hinds
Hunkey Hines
Mike Hines
Paul Hines
Gordie Hinkle
Dutch Hinrichs
Paul Hinrichs
Alex Hinshaw
George Hinshaw
Eric Hinske
Jerry Hinsley
Paul Hinson
Chuck Hinton
John Hinton
Rich Hinton
Tommy Hinzo
Herb Hippauf
Jason Hirsh
Gene Hiser
Larry Hisle
Harley Hisner
Billy Hitchcock
Jimmy Hitchcock
Sterling Hitchcock
Bruce Hitt
Roy Hitt
Lloyd Hittle
