= 1901 Chicago Orphans season =

1901 Chicago Orphans
- League: National League
- Ballpark: West Side Park
- City: Chicago
- Record: 53–86 (.381)
- League place: 6th
- Owners: Albert Spalding
- Managers: Tom Loftus

The 1901 Chicago Orphans season was the 30th season of the Chicago Orphans franchise, the 26th in the National League and the ninth at West Side Park. The Orphans finished sixth in the National League with a record of 53–86. The team was also known as the Remnants, due to many Orphans players leaving at the end of the 1900 season to join the upstart American League.

== Regular season ==
- On June 20, 1901, Jack Taylor threw a complete game. This was the first of a major league record 187 consecutive complete games that he would pitch, a streak stretching well into the 1906 season.

=== Season standings ===
National League
Team	W	L	Pct.	GB	Home	Road
Pittsburgh Pirates	90	49	.647	—	45‍–‍24	45‍–‍25
Philadelphia Phillies	83	57	.593	7½	46‍–‍23	37‍–‍34
Brooklyn Superbas	79	57	.581	9½	43‍–‍25	36‍–‍32
St. Louis Cardinals	76	64	.543	14½	40‍–‍31	36‍–‍33
Boston Beaneaters	69	69	.500	20½	41‍–‍29	28‍–‍40
Chicago Orphans	53	86	.381	37	30‍–‍39	23‍–‍47
New York Giants	52	85	.380	37	30‍–‍38	22‍–‍47
Cincinnati Reds	52	87	.374	38	27‍–‍43	25‍–‍44

=== Record vs. opponents ===
1901 National League record Sources:
Team	BSN	BRO	CHC	CIN	NYG	PHI	PIT	STL
Boston	—	10–10	13–6	11–8–1	14–6–1	7–13	5–15	9–11
Brooklyn	10–10	—	13–7	14–6–1	11–6	11–9	11–8	9–11
Chicago	6–13	7–13	—	10–10	11–9–1	3–17	6–14	10–10
Cincinnati	8–11–1	6–14–1	10–10	—	8–12	4–16	7–13	9–11–1
New York	6–14–1	6–11	9–11–1	12–8	—	8–12	4–16–1	7–13–1
Philadelphia	13–7	9–11	17–3	16–4	12–8	—	7–13	9–11
Pittsburgh	15–5	8–11	14–6	13–7	16–4–1	13–7	—	11–9
St. Louis	11–9	11–9	10–10	11–9–1	13–7–1	11–9	9–11	—

== Roster ==
2024 Chicago Orphans
Roster
Pitchers: Bert Cunningham; Mal Eason; Charlie Ferguson; Tom Hughes; Jack Taylor; Rube Waddell	Catchers: Mike Kahoe; Johnny Kling; Infielders: Cupid Childs; Pete Childs; Jim Delahanty; Charlie Dexter; Jack Doyle; Eddie Hickey; Larry Hoffman; Barry McCormick; Fred Raymer; Germany Schaefer	Outfielders: Frank Chance; Harry Croft; Cozy Dolan; Bill Gannon; Danny Green; Topsy Hartsel; Jock Menefee	Manager: Tom Loftus

== Player stats ==
=== Batting ===
==== Starters by position ====
Note: Pos = Position; G = Games played; AB = At bats; H = Hits; Avg. = Batting average; HR = Home runs; RBI = Runs batted in

Pos	Player	G	AB	H	Avg.	HR	RBI
C	Mike Kahoe	67	237	53	.224	1	21
1B	Jack Doyle	75	285	66	.232	0	39
2B	Cupid Childs	63	236	61	.258	0	21
SS	Barry McCormick	115	427	100	.234	1	32
3B	Fred Raymer	120	463	108	.233	0	43
OF	Topsy Hartsel	140	558	187	.335	7	54
OF	Danny Green	133	537	168	.313	6	61
OF	Frank Chance	69	241	67	.278	0	36

==== Other batters ====
Note: G = Games played; AB = At bats; H = Hits; Avg. = Batting average; HR = Home runs; RBI = Runs batted in

Player	G	AB	H	Avg.	HR	RBI
Charlie Dexter	116	460	123	.267	1	66
Johnny Kling	74	256	70	.273	0	21
Pete Childs	60	210	48	.229	0	14
Cozy Dolan	43	171	45	.263	0	16
Jock Menefee	48	152	39	.257	0	13
Jim Delahanty	17	63	12	.190	0	4
Bill Gannon	15	61	9	.148	0	0
Eddie Hickey	10	37	6	.162	0	3
Larry Hoffman	6	22	7	.318	0	6
Harry Croft	3	12	4	.333	0	4
Germany Schaefer	2	5	3	.600	0	0

=== Pitching ===
==== Starting pitchers ====
Note: G = Games pitched; IP = Innings pitched; W = Wins; L = Losses; ERA = Earned run average; SO = Strikeouts

Player	G	IP	W	L	ERA	SO
Tom Hughes	37	308.1	10	23	3.24	225
Jack Taylor	33	275.2	13	19	3.36	68
Rube Waddell	29	243.2	14	14	2.81	168
Mal Eason	27	220.2	8	17	3.59	68
Jock Menefee	21	182.1	8	12	3.80	55
Bert Cunningham	1	9.0	0	1	5.00	2

==== Relief pitchers ====
Note: G = Games pitched; W = Wins; L = Losses; SV = Saves; ERA = Earned run average; SO = Strikeouts

Player	G	W	L	SV	ERA	SO
Charlie Ferguson	1	0	0	0	0.00	0
