= 1901 St. Louis Cardinals season =

Major League Baseball season

1901 St. Louis Cardinals
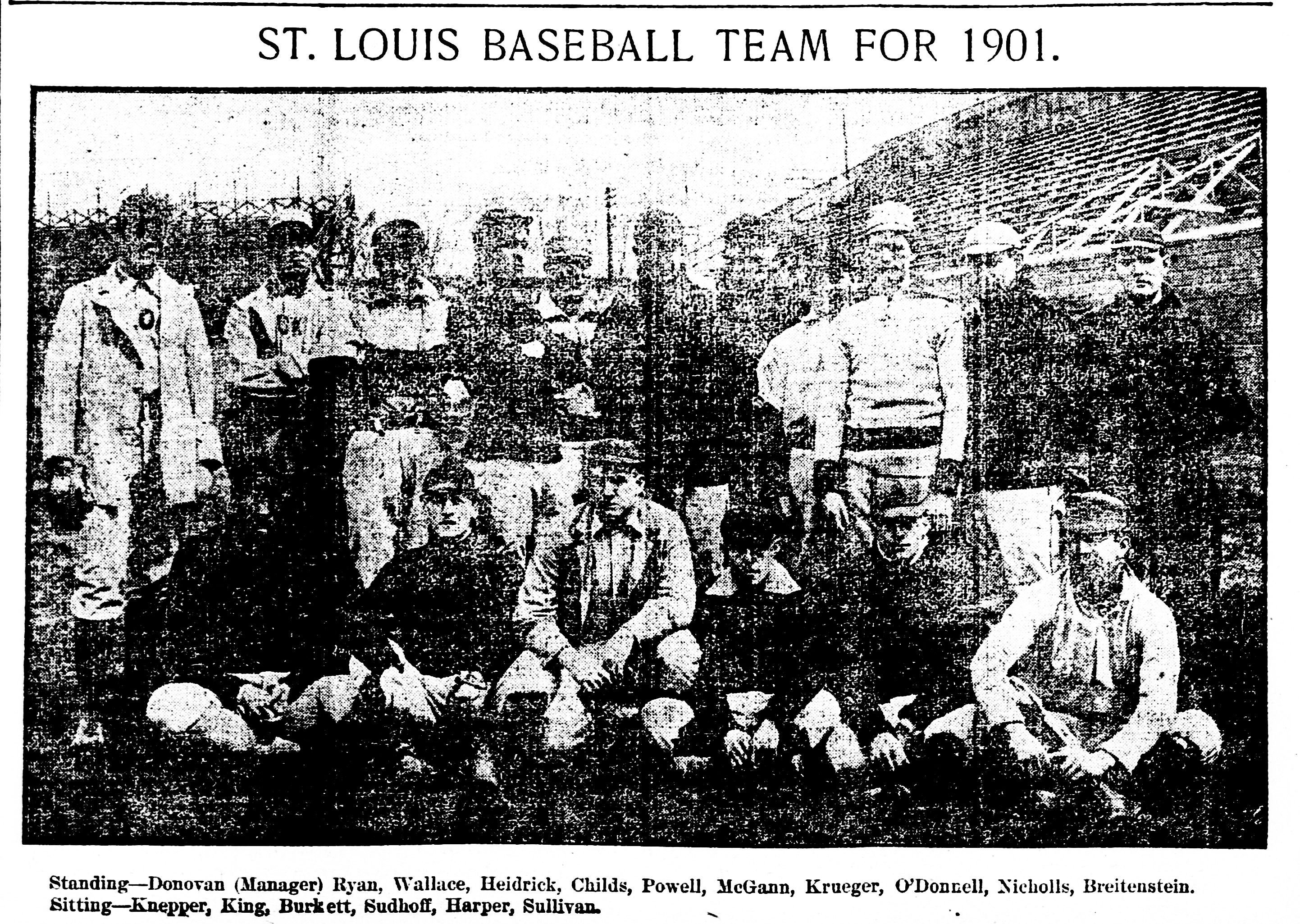
- League: National League
- Ballpark: League Park
- City: St. Louis, Missouri
- Record: 76–64 (.543)
- League place: 4th
- Owners: Frank Robison and Stanley Robison
- Managers: Patsy Donovan

The 1901 St. Louis Cardinals season was the team's 20th season in St. Louis, Missouri and the tenth season in the National League. The Cardinals went 76–64 during the season and finished fourth in the National League. It was the first time the Cardinals had finished in the top half of the standings since joining the National League.

== Regular season ==
=== Season standings ===
National League
Team	W	L	Pct.	GB	Home	Road
Pittsburgh Pirates	90	49	.647	—	45‍–‍24	45‍–‍25
Philadelphia Phillies	83	57	.593	7½	46‍–‍23	37‍–‍34
Brooklyn Superbas	79	57	.581	9½	43‍–‍25	36‍–‍32
St. Louis Cardinals	76	64	.543	14½	40‍–‍31	36‍–‍33
Boston Beaneaters	69	69	.500	20½	41‍–‍29	28‍–‍40
Chicago Orphans	53	86	.381	37	30‍–‍39	23‍–‍47
New York Giants	52	85	.380	37	30‍–‍38	22‍–‍47
Cincinnati Reds	52	87	.374	38	27‍–‍43	25‍–‍44

=== Record vs. opponents ===
1901 National League record Sources:
Team	BSN	BRO	CHC	CIN	NYG	PHI	PIT	STL
Boston	—	10–10	13–6	11–8–1	14–6–1	7–13	5–15	9–11
Brooklyn	10–10	—	13–7	14–6–1	11–6	11–9	11–8	9–11
Chicago	6–13	7–13	—	10–10	11–9–1	3–17	6–14	10–10
Cincinnati	8–11–1	6–14–1	10–10	—	8–12	4–16	7–13	9–11–1
New York	6–14–1	6–11	9–11–1	12–8	—	8–12	4–16–1	7–13–1
Philadelphia	13–7	9–11	17–3	16–4	12–8	—	7–13	9–11
Pittsburgh	15–5	8–11	14–6	13–7	16–4–1	13–7	—	11–9
St. Louis	11–9	11–9	10–10	11–9–1	13–7–1	11–9	9–11	—

=== Roster ===
1901 St. Louis Cardinals
Roster
Pitchers: Ted Breitenstein; Farmer Burns; Chauncey Fisher; Jack Harper; Cowboy Jones; Bill Magee; Ed Murphy; Mike O'Neill; Jack Powell; Willie Sudhoff; Bob Wicker; Stan Yerkes	Catchers: Mike Heydon; Art Nichols; Jack Ryan; Pop Schriver; Infielders: Pete Childs; Otto Krueger; Dan McGann; Dick Padden; Bill Richardson; Bobby Wallace	Outfielders: Jesse Burkett; Patsy Donovan; Emmet Heidrick	Manager: Patsy Donovan

== Player stats ==
=== Batting ===
==== Starters by position ====
Note: Pos = Position; G = Games played; AB = At bats; H = Hits; Avg. = Batting average; HR = Home runs; RBI = Runs batted in

Pos	Player	G	AB	H	Avg.	HR	RBI
C	Jack Ryan	83	300	59	.197	0	31
1B	Dan McGann	103	423	115	.272	6	56
2B	Dick Padden	123	489	125	.256	2	62
SS	Bobby Wallace	134	550	178	.324	2	91
3B	Otto Krueger	142	520	143	.275	2	79
OF	Patsy Donovan	130	531	161	.303	1	73
OF	Emmet Heidrick	118	502	170	.339	6	67
OF	Jesse Burkett	142	601	226	.376	10	75

==== Other batters ====
Note: G = Games played; AB = At bats; H = Hits; Avg. = Batting average; HR = Home runs; RBI = Runs batted in

Player	G	AB	H	Avg.	HR	RBI
Art Nichols	93	308	75	.244	1	33
Pop Schriver	53	166	45	.271	1	23
Pete Childs	29	79	21	.266	0	8
Bill Richardson	15	52	11	.212	2	7
Mike Heydon	16	43	9	.209	1	6

=== Pitching ===
==== Starting pitchers ====
Note: G = Games pitched; IP = Innings pitched; W = Wins; L = Losses; ERA = Earned run average; SO = Strikeouts

Player	G	IP	W	L	ERA	SO
Jack Powell	45	338.1	19	19	3.54	133
Jack Harper	39	308.2	23	13	3.62	128
Ed Murphy	23	165.0	10	9	4.20	42
Cowboy Jones	10	76.1	2	6	4.48	25
Mike O'Neill	5	41.0	2	2	1.32	16
Stan Yerkes	4	34.0	3	1	3.18	15
Ted Breitenstein	3	15.0	0	3	6.60	3
Bill Magee	1	8.0	0	0	4.50	3

==== Other pitchers ====
Note: G = Games pitched; IP = Innings pitched; W = Wins; L = Losses; ERA = Earned run average; SO = Strikeouts

Player	G	IP	W	L	ERA	SO
Willie Sudhoff	38	276.1	17	11	3.52	78

==== Relief pitchers ====
Note: G = Games pitched; W = Wins; L = Losses; SV = Saves; ERA = Earned run average; SO = Strikeouts

Player	G	W	L	SV	ERA	SO
Chauncey Fisher	1	0	0	0	15.00	0
Bob Wicker	1	0	0	0	0.00	2
Farmer Burns	1	0	0	0	9.00	0
