= 1901 Pittsburgh Pirates season =

1901 Pittsburgh Pirates
- National League champions
- League: National League
- Ballpark: Exposition Park
- City: Allegheny, Pennsylvania
- Owners: Barney Dreyfuss
- Managers: Fred Clarke

The 1901 Pittsburgh (Note: In the early 20th century and earlier, the name of Pittsburgh was spelled both with and without the 'h'.) Pirates finished in first place in the National League, 7½ games ahead of the second-place Philadelphia Phillies. It was the first year that the American League operated as a major league, but there would be no World Series between the leagues until 1903.

The team was managed by Fred Clarke, who was also their starting left fielder. Clarke, in his fifth year as a manager at age 28, won his first pennant. The Pirates won the National League championship in the next two years as well.

== Regular season ==
The Pirates were led offensively by Honus Wagner, who led the league in RBI and stolen bases. Although the "Flying Dutchman" had never played shortstop in the majors until 1901, he appeared 61 times at shortstop that year in addition to spending time at third base and the outfield.

In a league that batted .267 as a whole, the Pirates outfield was notable for its hitting. Ginger Beaumont hit .332, player-manager Fred Clarke hit .324, and Lefty Davis hit .313.

The pitching staff of the Pirates allowed the fewest runs in the league and was among the greatest ever. The four top starting pitchers – Deacon Phillippe, Jack Chesbro, Jesse Tannehill, and Sam Leever – were the four top pitchers in the National League in terms of winning percentage. All of them were in the top ten in the league in ERA. Future Hall of Famer Rube Waddell had pitched well in 1900 for the Pirates, but was sold in May 1901 to the Chicago Orphans. With a record of 90-49, the Pirates had the best record in the league.

=== Season standings ===
National League
Team	W	L	Pct.	GB	Home	Road
Pittsburgh Pirates	90	49	.647	—	45‍–‍24	45‍–‍25
Philadelphia Phillies	83	57	.593	7½	46‍–‍23	37‍–‍34
Brooklyn Superbas	79	57	.581	9½	43‍–‍25	36‍–‍32
St. Louis Cardinals	76	64	.543	14½	40‍–‍31	36‍–‍33
Boston Beaneaters	69	69	.500	20½	41‍–‍29	28‍–‍40
Chicago Orphans	53	86	.381	37	30‍–‍39	23‍–‍47
New York Giants	52	85	.380	37	30‍–‍38	22‍–‍47
Cincinnati Reds	52	87	.374	38	27‍–‍43	25‍–‍44

=== Record vs. opponents ===
1901 National League record Sources:
Team	BSN	BRO	CHC	CIN	NYG	PHI	PIT	STL
Boston	—	10–10	13–6	11–8–1	14–6–1	7–13	5–15	9–11
Brooklyn	10–10	—	13–7	14–6–1	11–6	11–9	11–8	9–11
Chicago	6–13	7–13	—	10–10	11–9–1	3–17	6–14	10–10
Cincinnati	8–11–1	6–14–1	10–10	—	8–12	4–16	7–13	9–11–1
New York	6–14–1	6–11	9–11–1	12–8	—	8–12	4–16–1	7–13–1
Philadelphia	13–7	9–11	17–3	16–4	12–8	—	7–13	9–11
Pittsburgh	15–5	8–11	14–6	13–7	16–4–1	13–7	—	11–9
St. Louis	11–9	11–9	10–10	11–9–1	13–7–1	11–9	9–11	—

=== Game log ===
1901 Game Log: 90–49 (Home: 45–24; Away: 45–25)
April: 3–3 (Home: 1–2; Away: 2–1)

#	Date	Opponent	Score	Win	Loss	Save	Attendance	Record
1	April 20	@ Reds	4–2			—	—	1–0
2	April 23	@ Cardinals	4–10			—	—	1–1
3	April 24	@ Cardinals	5–4			—	—	2–1
4	April 27	Cardinals	2–7			—	—	2–2
5	April 29	Cardinals	14–12			—	—	3–2
6	April 30	Cardinals	2–4			—	—	3–3

May: 13–11 (Home: 3–3; Away: 10–8)

#	Date	Opponent	Score	Win	Loss	Save	Attendance	Record
7	May 1	Orphans	3–8			—	—	3–4
8	May 2	Orphans	3–2			—	—	4–4
9	May 3	Orphans	10–6			—	—	5–4
10	May 4	Orphans	2–4			—	—	5–5
11	May 5	@ Orphans	4–2			—	—	6–5
12	May 7	@ Orphans	8–0			—	—	7–5
13	May 8	@ Orphans	8–7			—	—	8–5
14	May 9	@ Orphans	8–1			—	—	9–5
15	May 10	Reds	3–0			—	—	10–5
16	May 12	@ Reds	1–6			—	—	10–6
17	May 13	Reds	2–3			—	—	10–7
18	May 14	@ Phillies	3–2			—	—	11–7
19	May 15	@ Phillies	5–6			—	—	11–8
20	May 16	@ Phillies	2–12			—	—	11–9
21	May 17	@ Phillies	6–4			—	—	12–9
22	May 21	@ Giants	1–2			—	—	12–10
23	May 22	@ Giants	1–2			—	—	12–11
24	May 23	@ Beaneaters	3–7			—	—	12–12
25	May 24	@ Beaneaters	6–4			—	—	13–12
26	May 25	@ Beaneaters	11–1			—	—	14–12
27	May 28	@ Superbas	7–8			—	—	14–13
28	May 30	@ Superbas	4–3			—	2,300	15–13
29	May 30	@ Superbas	2–8			—	11,000	15–14
30	May 31	@ Superbas	5–2			—	—	16–14

June: 17–9 (Home: 10–4; Away: 7–5)

#	Date	Opponent	Score	Win	Loss	Save	Attendance	Record
31	June 1	Reds	3–4			—	—	16–15
32	June 2	@ Orphans	6–1			—	—	17–15
33	June 3	Phillies	11–1			—	—	18–15
34	June 4	Phillies	4–3			—	—	19–15
35	June 5	Phillies	5–2			—	—	20–15
36	June 6	Superbas	1–4			—	—	20–16
37	June 7	Superbas	5–4			—	—	21–16
38	June 8	Superbas	3–7			—	—	21–17
39	June 10	Giants	3–1			—	—	22–17
40	June 11	Giants	4–0			—	—	23–17
41	June 12	Giants	5–2			—	—	24–17
42	June 13	Beaneaters	6–2			—	—	25–17
43	June 14	Beaneaters	1–7			—	—	25–18
44	June 15	Beaneaters	1–0			—	—	26–18
45	June 16	@ Reds	2–0			—	—	27–18
46	June 18	Cardinals	9–2			—	—	28–18
47	June 19	@ Giants	5–5			—	—	28–18
48	June 20	@ Giants	7–0			—	—	29–18
49	June 21	@ Giants	2–3			—	—	29–19
50	June 22	@ Beaneaters	2–4			—	—	29–20
51	June 22	@ Beaneaters	6–2			—	—	30–20
52	June 24	@ Beaneaters	8–2			—	—	31–20
53	June 25	@ Beaneaters	4–9			—	—	31–21
54	June 26	@ Superbas	3–16			—	—	31–22
55	June 27	@ Superbas	7–8			—	—	31–23
56	June 28	@ Superbas	5–3			—	—	32–23
57	June 29	@ Phillies	5–4			—	—	33–23

July: 16–9 (Home: 12–6; Away: 4–3)

#	Date	Opponent	Score	Win	Loss	Save	Attendance	Record
58	July 1	@ Phillies	0–1			—	—	33–24
59	July 2	@ Phillies	5–3			—	—	34–24
60	July 4	Giants	3–5			—	—	34–25
61	July 4	Giants	12–0			—	—	35–25
62	July 5	Giants	7–2			—	—	36–25
63	July 6	Giants	6–2			—	—	37–25
64	July 8	Beaneaters	5–0			—	—	38–25
65	July 9	Beaneaters	9–4			—	—	39–25
66	July 10	Beaneaters	1–0			—	—	40–25
67	July 11	Beaneaters	5–0			—	—	41–25
68	July 12	Phillies	2–4			—	—	41–26
69	July 13	Phillies	5–3			—	—	42–26
70	July 14	@ Orphans	3–1			—	—	43–26
71	July 16	Phillies	3–6			—	—	43–27
72	July 17	Superbas	3–7			—	—	43–28
73	July 18	Superbas	3–4			—	—	43–29
74	July 19	Superbas	4–5			—	—	43–30
75	July 20	Superbas	15–2			—	—	44–30
76	July 23	Reds	9–2			—	—	45–30
77	July 24	Reds	11–2			—	—	46–30
78	July 25	Reds	9–5			—	—	47–30
79	July 26	@ Cardinals	7–12			—	—	47–31
80	July 27	@ Cardinals	7–4			—	—	48–31
81	July 28	@ Cardinals	3–5			—	—	48–32
82	July 29	@ Cardinals	8–0			—	—	49–32

August: 13–9 (Home: 7–7; Away: 6–2)

#	Date	Opponent	Score	Win	Loss	Save	Attendance	Record
83	August 3	Reds	4–7			—	—	49–33
84	August 4	@ Reds	6–3			—	—	50–33
85	August 5	Cardinals	6–20			—	—	50–34
86	August 6	Cardinals	8–1			—	—	51–34
87	August 7	Cardinals	9–3			—	—	52–34
88	August 8	Orphans	7–6			—	—	53–34
89	August 9	Orphans	1–4			—	—	53–35
90	August 11	@ Orphans	5–1			—	—	54–35
91	August 17	Reds	5–0			—	—	55–35
92	August 18	@ Reds	4–5			—	—	55–36
93	August 19	@ Cardinals	9–5			—	—	56–36
94	August 20	@ Cardinals	14–2			—	—	57–36
95	August 21	@ Cardinals	3–4			—	—	57–37
96	August 22	@ Cardinals	4–3			—	—	58–37
97	August 25	@ Reds	6–3			—	—	59–37
98	August 26	Cardinals	2–5			—	—	59–38
99	August 27	Cardinals	7–1			—	—	60–38
100	August 28	Cardinals	7–9			—	—	60–39
101	August 29	Orphans	1–4			—	—	60–40
102	August 29	Orphans	2–1			—	—	61–40
103	August 31	Orphans	1–5			—	—	61–41
104	August 31	Orphans	5–2			—	—	62–41

September: 25–7 (Home: 10–2; Away: 15–5)

#	Date	Opponent	Score	Win	Loss	Save	Attendance	Record
105	September 2	@ Beaneaters	5–3			—	—	63–41
106	September 2	@ Beaneaters	3–0			—	—	64–41
107	September 3	@ Beaneaters	5–2			—	—	65–41
108	September 4	@ Giants	12–6			—	—	66–41
109	September 4	@ Giants	10–3			—	—	67–41
110	September 5	@ Giants	15–1			—	—	68–41
111	September 5	@ Giants	15–7			—	—	69–41
112	September 6	@ Giants	15–2			—	—	70–41
113	September 6	@ Giants	13–4			—	—	71–41
114	September 7	@ Phillies	1–4			—	—	71–42
115	September 9	@ Phillies	11–5			—	—	72–42
116	September 10	@ Phillies	8–5			—	—	73–42
117	September 11	@ Superbas	5–4			—	—	74–42
118	September 13	@ Superbas	3–5			—	—	74–43
119	September 13	@ Superbas	2–4			—	—	74–44
120	September 14	Reds	5–3			—	—	75–44
121	September 14	Reds	8–4			—	—	76–44
122	September 15	@ Reds	3–0			—	—	77–44
123	September 17	@ Reds	7–2			—	—	78–44
124	September 18	Phillies	5–1			—	—	79–44
125	September 20	Phillies	10–1			—	—	80–44
126	September 20	Phillies	7–2			—	—	81–44
127	September 21	Phillies	2–4			—	—	81–45
128	September 22	@ Orphans	15–9			—	—	82–45
129	September 23	Giants	5–4			—	—	83–45
130	September 24	Giants	14–9			—	—	84–45
131	September 25	Giants	10–5			—	—	85–45
132	September 26	Superbas	4–3			—	—	86–45
133	September 27	Superbas	5–4			—	—	87–45
134	September 29	@ Reds	1–2			—	—	87–46
135	September 29	@ Reds	1–2			—	—	87–47
136	September 30	Beaneaters	1–5			—	—	87–48

October: 3–1 (Home: 2–0; Away: 1–1)

#	Date	Opponent	Score	Win	Loss	Save	Attendance	Record
137	October 1	Beaneaters	9–0			—	—	88–48
138	October 2	Beaneaters	8–4			—	—	89–48
139	October 5	@ Orphans	1–2			—	—	89–49
140	October 6	@ Orphans	9–5			—	—	90–49

Legend: = Win = Loss = Tie
Bold = Pittsburgh Pirates team member

=== Detailed records ===
National League
Opponent	W	L	WP	RS	RA
Boston Beaneaters	15	5	0.750	99	56
Brooklyn Superbas	8	11	0.421	86	101
Chicago Orphans	14	6	0.700	102	71
Cincinnati Reds	13	7	0.650	94	55
New York Giants	16	4	0.800	165	65
Philadelphia Phillies	13	7	0.650	100	73
**Pittsburgh Pirates**					
St. Louis Cardinals	11	9	0.550	130	113
Total	90	49	0.647	776	534
Season Total	90	49	0.647	776	534

Month	Games	Won	Lost	Win %	RS	RA
April	6	3	3	0.500	31	39
May	24	13	11	0.542	108	100
June	26	17	9	0.654	123	96
July	25	16	9	0.640	145	79
August	22	13	9	0.591	116	94
September	32	25	7	0.781	226	115
October	4	3	1	0.750	27	11
Total	139	90	49	0.647	776	534

	Games	Won	Lost	Win %	RS	RA
Home	69	45	24	0.652	372	255
Away	70	45	25	0.643	399	274
Total	139	90	49	0.647	776	534

=== Opening Day lineup ===
- Chief Zimmer – C
- Kitty Bransfield – 1B
- Claude Ritchey – 2B
- Tommy Leach – 3B
- Bones Ely – SS
- Fred Clarke – LF
- Ginger Beaumont – CF
- Lefty Davis – RF

=== Roster ===
1901 Pittsburgh Pirates
**Roster**
**Pitchers**: Jack Chesbro; Ed Doheny; Sam Leever; George Merritt; Deacon Phillippe; Ed Poole; Jesse Tannehill; Rube Waddell; Snake Wiltse	**Catchers**: Jiggs Donahue; Jack O'Connor; George Yeager; Chief Zimmer; **Infielders**: Kitty Bransfield; Jimmy Burke; Lew Carr; Truck Eagan; Bones Ely; Tommy Leach; Claude Ritchey; Jud Smith; Terry Turner; Honus Wagner	**Outfielders**: Ginger Beaumont; Fred Clarke; Lefty Davis; Mike Smith	**Manager**: Fred Clarke

== Awards and honors ==
Ginger Beaumont

- #3 in NL in runs scored (120)

Deacon Phillippe

- #2 in NL in ERA (2.22)
- #3 in NL in wins (22)

Jesse Tannehill

- NL leader in ERA (2.18)

Honus Wagner

- NL leader in RBI (126)
- NL leader in stolen bases (49)
- #4 in NL in batting average (.353)
- #4 in NL in on-base percentage (.417)

== Statistics ==
=== Batting ===
==== Starters by position ====
Note: Pos = Position; G = Games played; AB = At bats; H = Hits; Avg. = Batting average; HR = Home runs; RBI = Runs batted in

Pos	Player	G	AB	H	Avg.	HR	RBI
C	Chief Zimmer	69	236	52	.220	0	21
1B	Kitty Bransfield	139	566	167	.295	0	91
2B	Claude Ritchey	140	540	160	.296	1	74
SS	Honus Wagner	140	549	194	.353	6	126
3B	Tommy Leach	98	374	114	.305	2	44
OF	Fred Clarke	129	527	171	.324	6	60
OF	Lefty Davis	87	335	105	.313	2	33
OF	Ginger Beaumont	133	558	185	.332	8	72

==== Other batters ====
Note: G = Games played; AB = At bats; H = Hits; Avg. = Batting average; HR = Home runs; RBI = Runs batted in

Player	G	AB	H	Avg.	HR	RBI
Bones Ely	65	240	50	.208	0	28
Jack O'Connor	61	202	39	.193	0	22
George Yeager	26	91	24	.264	0	10
Ed Poole	26	78	16	.205	1	4
Jimmy Burke	14	51	10	.196	0	4
Lew Carr	9	28	7	.250	0	4
Jud Smith	6	21	3	.143	0	0
Truck Eagan	4	12	1	.083	0	2
Terry Turner	7	7	3	.429	0	1
Mike Smith	4	4	0	.000	0	0
Jiggs Donahue	2	0	0	----	0	0

=== Pitching ===
==== Starting pitchers ====
Note: G = Games pitched; IP = Innings pitched; W = Wins; L = Losses; ERA = Earned run average; SO = Strikeouts

Player	G	IP	W	L	ERA	SO
Deacon Phillippe	37	296.0	22	12	2.22	103
Jack Chesbro	36	287.2	21	10	2.38	129
Jesse Tannehill	35	252.1	18	10	2.18	118
Sam Leever	21	176.0	14	5	2.86	82
Ed Poole	12	80.0	5	4	3.60	26
Ed Doheny	11	76.2	6	2	2.00	28
George Merritt	3	24.0	3	0	4.88	5
Rube Waddell	2	7.2	0	2	9.39	4

==== Other pitchers ====
Note: G = Games pitched; IP = Innings pitched; W = Wins; L = Losses; ERA = Earned run average; SO = Strikeouts

Player	G	IP	W	L	ERA	SO
Snake Wiltse	7	44.1	1	4	4.26	10

== Transactions ==
- June 27, 1901: Snake Wiltse was released by the Pirates.
