= Cozy Dolan =

Cozy Dolan may refer to:

- Cozy Dolan (1900s outfielder) (1872–1907), American baseball player
- Cozy Dolan (1910s outfielder) (1882–1958), American baseball player
