= George Grosart =

American baseball player (1880-1902)

- Left fielder
- Born: April 11, 1880; Meadville, Pennsylvania, U.S.
- Died: April 18, 1902 (aged 22); Pittsburgh, Pennsylvania, U.S.
- Batted: Unknown Threw: Unknown

MLB debut
- June 7, 1901, for the Boston Beaneaters

Last MLB appearance
- June 15, 1901, for the Boston Beaneaters

MLB statistics
- Batting average: .115
- Home runs: 0
- Runs batted in: 1
- Stats at Baseball Reference

Teams
- Boston Beaneaters (1901)

George Albert Grosart (April 11, 1880 – April 18, 1902) was an American professional baseball player. He appeared in seven major-league games, with the 1901 Boston Beaneaters, a National League franchise later known as the Boston Braves, which went on to become the Milwaukee Braves and then the Atlanta Braves.

Grosart also played in the minor leagues with the Dayton Old Soldiers. Prior to the 1902 season, Grosart signed with the Toledo Mud Hens and joined them for spring training, but returned home to Pennsylvania after developing "consumption of the stomach" (typhoid fever), where he died in mid-April.

== See also ==
- List of baseball players who died during their careers
