= Lew Carr =

American baseball player (1872–1954)

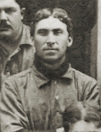
- Shortstop
- Born: August 15, 1872; Union Springs, New York, U.S.
- Died: June 15, 1954 (aged 81); Moravia, New York, U.S.
- Batted: Right Threw: Right

MLB debut
- July 2, 1901, for the Pittsburgh Pirates

Last MLB appearance
- July 13, 1901, for the Pittsburgh Pirates

MLB statistics
- Batting average: .250
- Home runs: 0
- Runs batted in: 4
- Stats at Baseball Reference

Teams
- Pittsburgh Pirates (1901)

Lewis Smith Carr (August 15, 1872 – June 15, 1954) was an American shortstop and third baseman in Major League Baseball. In 1901, he played "alongside Honus Wagner for a championship Pittsburgh Pirates team." Unfortunately, his career as a Pirate came to an abrupt end when a hard pitched ball hit and seriously injured him. Despite initial complaints from many of the fans, Honus Wagner took over Lew's position and went on to become one of the greatest shortstops of all time.

Carr attended and played baseball at Syracuse University, later coaching the school's baseball team from 1910 to 1942. The Orangemen were 275–268 with Carr at the helm. In 1952, the school's baseball diamond was renamed in his honor.

Carr was a two-sport athlete who played professionally for the 1901 Pittsburgh Pirates in Major League Baseball. In addition to his baseball career, he also competed for at least one semi-professional football club, the Newark Athletic Club of Newark, NJ.

During the 1890s, Carr was regarded as one of the top college athletes of his era and was widely considered a better football player than a baseball player. The earliest known record of him participating in a semi-professional football game was on November 7, 1899, when he played for the Newark Athletic Club against the 1899 Lafayette football team.
