= Heinie Smith =

American baseball player (1871–1939)

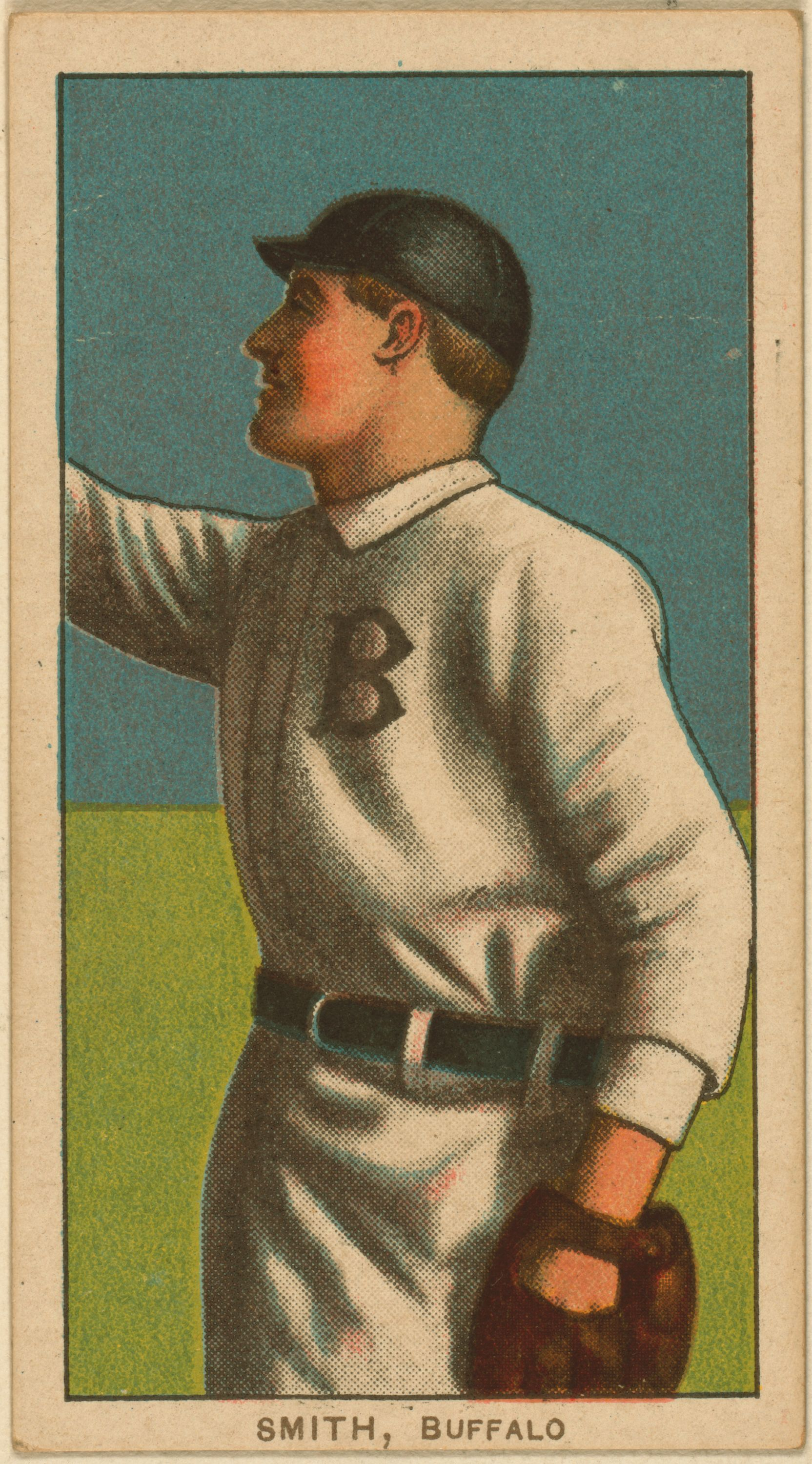
- Second baseman / Manager
- Born: October 24, 1871; Pittsburgh, Pennsylvania, U.S.
- Died: June 25, 1939 (aged 67); Buffalo, New York, U.S.
- Batted: Right Threw: Right

MLB debut
- September 8, 1897, for the Louisville Colonels

Last MLB appearance
- August 16, 1903, for the Detroit Tigers

MLB statistics
- Batting average: .238
- Home runs: 1
- Runs batted in: 92
- Stats at Baseball Reference

Teams
- As player: Louisville Colonels (1897–1898); Pittsburgh Pirates (1899); New York Giants (1901–1902); Detroit Tigers (1903); As manager: New York Giants (1902)

George Henry "Heinie" Smith (October 24, 1871 – June 25, 1939) was an American second baseman and manager in Major League Baseball (MLB) who played for the Louisville Colonels (1897–1898), Pittsburgh Pirates (1899), New York Giants (1901–1902) and Detroit Tigers (1903).

== Career ==
In his best season in 1902, Smith hit .252 and posted career-highs in games (138), runs batted in (RBIs) (33), hits (129), doubles (19), runs (46), and stolen bases (32). Also during that year, Smith took over as interim manager of the New York Giants and recorded a 5–27 record before being replaced by John McGraw. Smith then returned to being a full-time player.

In his career, Smith posted a .238 batting average with three home runs and 91 RBIs in 311 games played.

== After Major League career ==
Following his majors career, Smith played and managed in the International League for the Buffalo Bisons and coached the University at Buffalo baseball team in 1915 and 1916.

Smith died in Buffalo, New York at the age of 67.

== Major League Heinie's ==
"Heinie" was a common nickname for German baseball players in the early part of the 20th century. Smith was one of 22 Major League Heinie's in the first half of the 20th century. They include Heinie Manush, Heinie Groh, Heinie Zimmerman, Heinie Beckendorf and Heinie Schuble. In the 60-plus years since the end of World War II, there has not been a single Heinie in Major League Baseball.

== See also ==
- List of Major League Baseball player–managers
