= Ray Nelson (baseball) =

American baseball player (1875-1961)

- Second baseman
- Born: August 4, 1875; Holyoke, Massachusetts, U.S.
- Died: January 8, 1961 (aged 85); Mount Vernon, New York, U.S.
- Batted: Right Threw: Right

MLB debut
- May 6, 1901, for the New York Giants

Last MLB appearance
- August 16, 1901, for the New York Giants

MLB statistics
- Batting average: .200
- Hits: 26
- Runs batted in: 7
- Stats at Baseball Reference

Teams
- New York Giants (1901)

Raymond Nelson Kellogg (known professionally as Ray "Kell" Nelson; August 4, 1875 – January 8, 1961) was an American Major League Baseball infielder for the New York Giants in 1901. He went to Amherst College and was captain of the school's baseball team.

During his baseball-playing career, he taught English at the Polytechnic Institute. Following his baseball career, he taught for several years at Morris High School. He coached the NYU Violets baseball team for several years using his last name, Kellogg.
