= Jake Livingstone (baseball) =

Russian baseball player (1880-1949)

- Pitcher
- Born: January 1, 1880; Saint Petersburg, Russia
- Died: March 22, 1949 (aged 69); Wassaic, New York, U.S.
- Batted: Unknown Threw: unknown

MLB debut
- September 6, 1901, for the New York Giants

Last MLB appearance
- September 9, 1901, for the New York Giants

MLB statistics
- Win–loss record: 0–0
- Earned run average: 9.00
- Strikeouts: 6

Teams
- New York Giants (1901)

Jacob M. Livingstone (January 1, 1880 – March 22, 1949) was a Major League Baseball pitcher who played in 1901 with the New York Giants.

He was born in Saint Petersburg, Russia and died in Wassaic, New York.
