= 1901 Philadelphia Phillies season =

National League season

1901 Philadelphia Phillies
- League: National League
- Ballpark: National League Park
- City: Philadelphia, Pennsylvania
- Owners: Al Reach, John Rogers
- Managers: Bill Shettsline

The following lists the events of the 1901 Philadelphia Phillies season. The Phillies finished second in the National League with a record of 83–57.

== Regular season ==
=== Season standings ===
National League
Team	W	L	Pct.	GB	Home	Road
Pittsburgh Pirates	90	49	.647	—	45‍–‍24	45‍–‍25
Philadelphia Phillies	83	57	.593	7½	46‍–‍23	37‍–‍34
Brooklyn Superbas	79	57	.581	9½	43‍–‍25	36‍–‍32
St. Louis Cardinals	76	64	.543	14½	40‍–‍31	36‍–‍33
Boston Beaneaters	69	69	.500	20½	41‍–‍29	28‍–‍40
Chicago Orphans	53	86	.381	37	30‍–‍39	23‍–‍47
New York Giants	52	85	.380	37	30‍–‍38	22‍–‍47
Cincinnati Reds	52	87	.374	38	27‍–‍43	25‍–‍44

=== Record vs. opponents ===
1901 National League record Sources:
Team	BSN	BRO	CHC	CIN	NYG	PHI	PIT	STL
Boston	—	10–10	13–6	11–8–1	14–6–1	7–13	5–15	9–11
Brooklyn	10–10	—	13–7	14–6–1	11–6	11–9	11–8	9–11
Chicago	6–13	7–13	—	10–10	11–9–1	3–17	6–14	10–10
Cincinnati	8–11–1	6–14–1	10–10	—	8–12	4–16	7–13	9–11–1
New York	6–14–1	6–11	9–11–1	12–8	—	8–12	4–16–1	7–13–1
Philadelphia	13–7	9–11	17–3	16–4	12–8	—	7–13	9–11
Pittsburgh	15–5	8–11	14–6	13–7	16–4–1	13–7	—	11–9
St. Louis	11–9	11–9	10–10	11–9–1	13–7–1	11–9	9–11	—

=== Roster ===
1901 Philadelphia Phillies
Roster
Pitchers: Red Donahue; Bill Duggleby; Jack Dunn; Al Orth; Happy Townsend; Doc White	Catchers: Klondike Douglass; Fred Jacklitsch; Ed McFarland; Infielders: Shad Barry; Bert Conn; Monte Cross; Joe Dolan; Bill Hallman; Hughie Jennings; Harry Wolverton	Outfielders: George Browne; Ed Delahanty; Elmer Flick; Jimmy Slagle; Roy Thomas	Manager: Bill Shettsline

== Player stats ==
=== Batting ===
==== Starters by position ====
Note: Pos = Position; G = Games played; AB = At bats; H = Hits; Avg. = Batting average; HR = Home runs; RBI = Runs batted in

Pos	Player	G	AB	H	Avg.	HR	RBI
C	Ed McFarland	74	295	84	.285	1	32
1B	Hughie Jennings	82	302	79	.262	1	39
2B	Bill Hallman	123	445	82	.184	0	38
SS	Monte Cross	139	483	95	.197	1	44
3B	Harry Wolverton	93	379	117	.309	0	43
OF	Roy Thomas	129	479	148	.309	1	28
OF	Elmer Flick	138	540	180	.333	8	88
OF	Ed Delahanty	139	542	192	.354	8	108

==== Other batters ====
Note: G = Games played; AB = At bats; H = Hits; Avg. = Batting average; HR = Home runs; RBI = Runs batted in

Player	G	AB	H	Avg.	HR	RBI
Shad Barry	67	252	62	.246	1	22
Jimmy Slagle	48	183	37	.202	1	20
Klondike Douglass	51	173	56	.324	0	23
Fred Jacklitsch	33	120	30	.250	0	24
Joe Dolan	10	37	3	.081	0	2
George Browne	8	26	5	.192	0	4
Bert Conn	5	18	4	.222	0	0

=== Pitching ===
==== Starting pitchers ====
Note: G = Games pitched; IP = Innings pitched; W = Wins; L = Losses; ERA = Earned run average; SO = Strikeouts

Player	G	IP	W	L	ERA	SO
Red Donahue	34	295.1	20	13	2.59	88
Bill Duggleby	35	284.2	20	12	2.88	95
Al Orth	35	281.2	20	12	2.27	92
Doc White	31	236.2	14	13	3.19	132
Happy Townsend	19	143.2	9	6	3.45	72
Jack Dunn	2	4.2	0	1	21.21	1
