= Roger Denzer =

American baseball player (1871–1949)

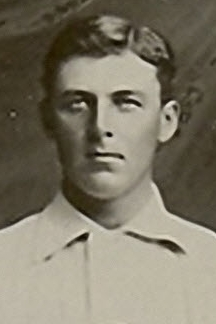
- Pitcher
- Born: October 5, 1871; Le Sueur, Minnesota, U.S.
- Died: September 18, 1949 (aged 77); Le Sueur, Minnesota, U.S.
- Batted: Left Threw: Right

MLB debut
- April 24, 1897, for the Chicago Colts

Last MLB appearance
- August 28, 1901, for the New York Giants

MLB statistics
- Win–loss record: 4–14
- Earned run average: 4.43
- Strikeouts: 39
- Stats at Baseball Reference

Teams
- Chicago Colts (1897); New York Giants (1901)

Roger "Peaceful Valley" Denzer (October 5, 1871 – September 18, 1949) was an American pitcher in Major League Baseball. He played for the Chicago Colts and New York Giants around the turn of the 20th century. Denzer received his nickname from the play Peaceful Valley because he resembled one of its actors, Sol Smith Russell.

== Biography ==
Denzer was born in Le Sueur, Minnesota, in 1871. He started his professional career with the St. Paul Apostles in 1895, as an outfielder. The following season, he converted to pitching and led the Western League with 200 strikeouts.

In 1897, Denzer had a brief trial with the National League's Chicago Colts but went just 2–8. He then returned to the Western League for the rest of the campaign and went 11–7 with a 1.62 earned run average. In 1898, he had likely the best season of his career, going 33–10 in 46 games and 385 innings pitched and leading the league in wins.

In 1900, Denzer joined the Chicago White Stockings (now known as the White Sox) of the American League, which would declare itself a major league the following year. He was the ace of the White Stockings pitching staff, winning 20 games and losing just 10. On April 22, he earned the first win in franchise history. Chicago won the pennant that year.

Denzer jumped to the NL's New York Giants during the offseason. He pitched decently for them in 1901 but went just 2–6. In 1902, he pitched 21 innings for the Louisville Colonels of the American Association, and that was where he finished his professional career.

Afterwards, Denzer retired to his farm near LeSueur and pitched in local semi-professional games. He pitched for a team in Belle Plaine, Minnesota, in 1905.

Denzer died in 1949, at the age of 77, and was buried in Mound Cemetery in Le Sueur.
