= Fred Raymer =

American baseball player (1875-1957)

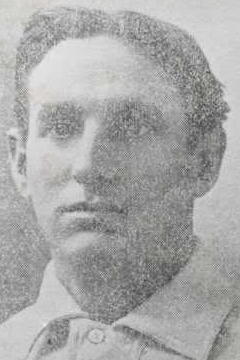
- Infielder
- Born: November 12, 1875; Leavenworth, Kansas, U.S.
- Died: June 11, 1957 (aged 81); Los Angeles, California, U.S.
- Batted: Right Threw: Right

MLB debut
- April 24, 1901, for the Chicago Orphans

Last MLB appearance
- October 7, 1905, for the Boston Beaneaters

MLB statistics
- Batting average: .218
- Home runs: 1
- Runs batted in: 10
- Stats at Baseball Reference

Teams
- Chicago Orphans (1901); Boston Beaneaters (1904–1905)

Frederick Charles Raymer (November 12, 1875 – June 11, 1957) was an American infielder in Major League Baseball.

Raymer was interred at Rose Hills Memorial Park.

== Sources ==
- Career statistics from Baseball Reference · Baseball Reference (Minors) · Retrosheet · Baseball Almanac
