= Brickyard Kennedy =

American baseball player (1867–1915)

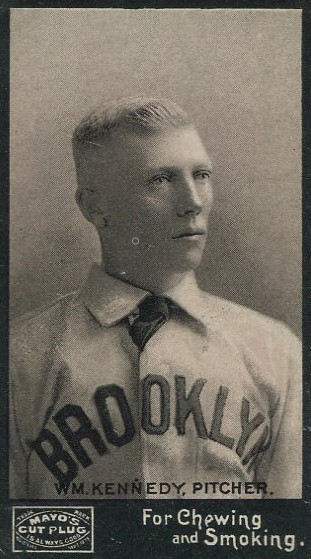
- 1895 baseball card of Kennedy
- Pitcher
- Born: October 7, 1867; Bellaire, Ohio, U.S.
- Died: September 23, 1915 (aged 47); Bellaire, Ohio, U.S.
- Batted: Right Threw: Right

MLB debut
- April 26, 1892, for the Brooklyn Grooms

Last MLB appearance
- September 26, 1903, for the Pittsburgh Pirates

MLB statistics
- Win–loss record: 187–159
- Earned run average: 3.96
- Strikeouts: 799
- Stats at Baseball Reference

Teams
- Brooklyn Grooms/Bridegrooms/Superbas (1892–1901); New York Giants (1902); Pittsburgh Pirates (1903)

Career highlights and awards
- 2× National League champion (1899, 1900)

William Park Kennedy (October 7, 1867 – September 23, 1915), nicknamed "Brickyard" and "Roaring Bill", was an American pitcher in Major League Baseball from 1892 to 1903. He played for the Brooklyn Grooms/Bridegrooms/Superbas (1892–1901), New York Giants (1902), and Pittsburgh Pirates (1903).

== Baseball career ==
Kennedy was born in Bellaire, Ohio, in 1867. From 1889 to 1891, he played minor league baseball. Kennedy then joined Brooklyn of the National League. He won over 10 games for Brooklyn every year from 1892 to 1900. He had four 20-win seasons, including a career-high 25 in 1893.

In 1901, Kennedy won three games. He was then released by Brooklyn and signed with New York, winning one game with them.

Kennedy signed with Pittsburgh for the 1903 season and won nine games for the team, which won the National League championship. He started one game in the 1903 World Series and lost. It was his last major league game.

From 1904 to 1908, Kennedy played in the Central League.

== Legacy ==
During his 12-year major league career, Kennedy had a 187–159 win–loss record with a 3.96 earned run average and 799 strikeouts in 3,030 innings pitched. He had the fourth-most wins of the 1890s, behind Kid Nichols, Cy Young, and Amos Rusie.

Kennedy was a better than average hitting pitcher in his major league career. He posted a .261 batting average (334-for-1279) with 1 home run and 148 RBI along with 54 doubles and 21 triples.

Kennedy was nicknamed "Brickyard". He was also commonly known as "Roaring Bill" because he had a loud voice and talked a lot.

Kennedy died in Bellaire, Ohio, in 1915, at the age of 47 of tuberculosis.

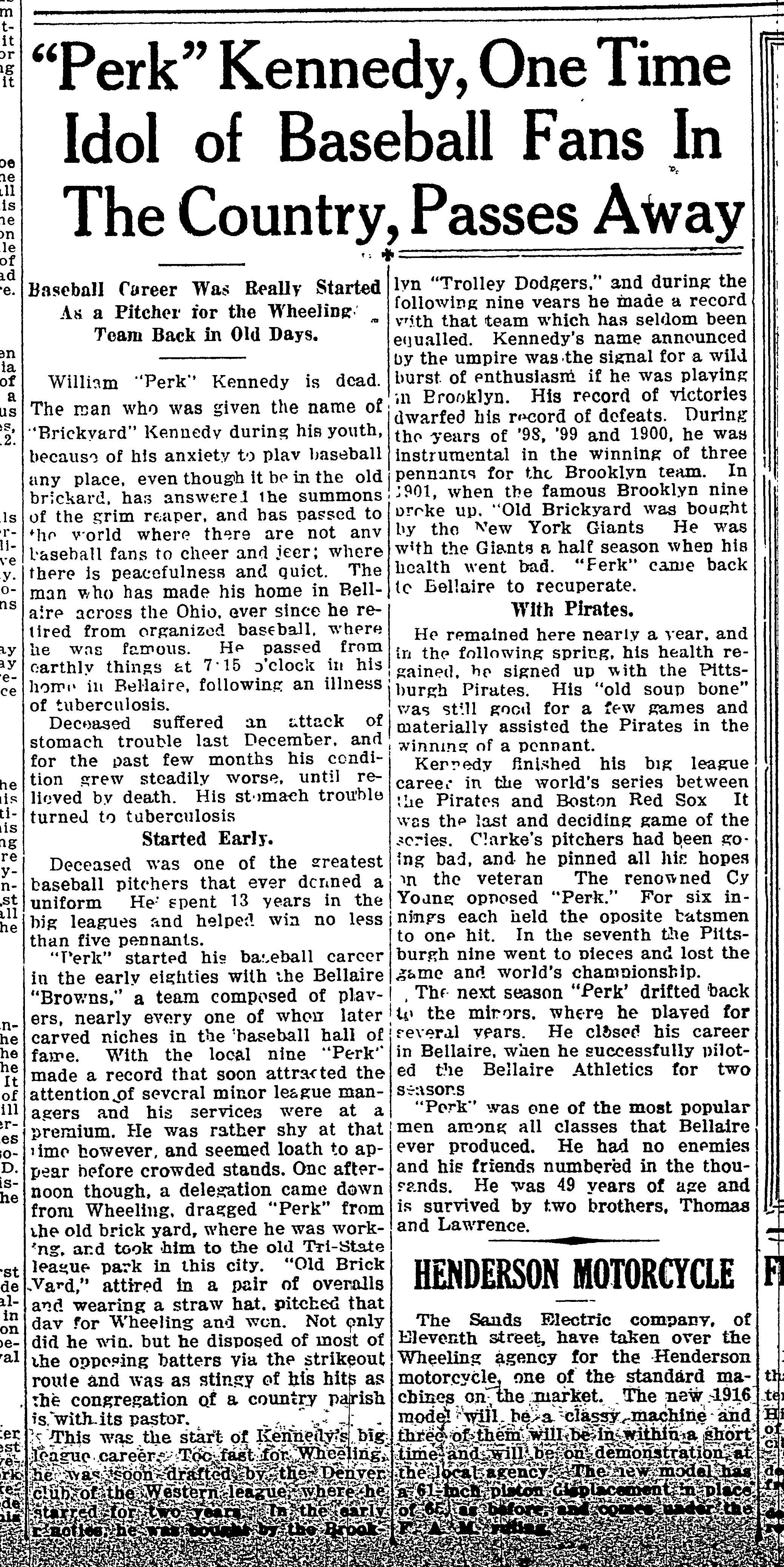
Brickyard Kennedy Obituary, Wheeling Daily Register, September 24th, 1915

Preceded by Ed Stein; Harley Payne	Brooklyn Grooms/Bridegrooms/Superbas; Opening Day starting pitcher 1894–1896; 1898–1900	Succeeded by Harley Payne; Wild Bill Donovan
