= John Hinton (baseball) =

American baseball player (1876-1920)

- Third baseman
- Born: June 19, 1876; Pittsburgh, Pennsylvania, U.S.
- Died: July 19, 1920 (aged 44); Woodville, Pennsylvania, U.S.
- Batted: Right Threw: Right

MLB debut
- June 3, 1901, for the Boston Beaneaters

Last MLB appearance
- June 7, 1901, for the Boston Beaneaters

MLB statistics
- Batting average: .077
- Home runs: 0
- Runs batted in: 0
- Stats at Baseball Reference

Teams
- Boston Beaneaters (1901)

John Robert Hinton (June 19, 1876 – June 3, 1920), nicknamed "Red", was an American professional baseball third baseman who played four games for the Boston Beaneaters of Major League Baseball (MLB) in 1901. Hinton played 725 games in Minor League Baseball from 1898 to 1912.
