= Harley Payne =

American baseball player (1868–1935)

- Pitcher
- Born: January 9, 1868; Windsor, Ohio, U.S.
- Died: December 29, 1935 (aged 67); Orwell, Ohio, U.S.
- Batted: Switch Threw: Left

MLB debut
- April 18, 1896, for the Brooklyn Bridegrooms

Last MLB appearance
- June 8, 1899, for the Pittsburgh Pirates

MLB statistics
- Win–loss record: 30–36
- Earned run average: 4.04
- Strikeouts: 148
- Stats at Baseball Reference

Teams
- Brooklyn Bridegrooms (1896–1898); Pittsburgh Pirates (1899)

Harley Fenwick Payne (January 8, 1868 – December 29, 1935) was an American professional baseball player who played pitcher for the Brooklyn Bridegrooms and Pittsburgh Pirates from 1896 to 1899.

Preceded by Brickyard Kennedy	Brooklyn Bridegrooms Opening Day; Starting pitcher 1897	Succeeded by Brickyard Kennedy
