= Bob Lawson =

American baseball player (1875-1952)

- Pitcher
- Born: August 23, 1875; Lynchburg, Virginia, U.S.
- Died: October 28, 1952 (aged 77); Durham, North Carolina, U.S.
- Batted: Right Threw: Right

MLB debut
- May 7, 1901, for the Boston Beaneaters

Last MLB appearance
- June 10, 1902, for the Baltimore Orioles

MLB statistics
- Win–loss record: 2-4
- Earned run average: 3.66
- Strikeouts: 17
- Stats at Baseball Reference

Teams
- Boston Beaneaters (1901); Baltimore Orioles (1902)

Robert Baker Lawson (August 23, 1875 – October 28, 1952) was an American Major League Baseball pitcher. Lawson played for the Boston Beaneaters in 1901 and the Baltimore Orioles in 1902. In nine career games, he had a 2–4 record, with a 3.66 ERA. He batted and threw right-handed.

Lawson was born in Brookneal, Virginia and died in Durham, North Carolina. He attended the University of North Carolina, where he also served as the head baseball coach in 1900, 1905, 1906, and 1910, and later as a professor at the University of North Carolina School of Medicine.

== Pro Career ==
In addition to being a pitcher, Lawson also played third base and outfield for the Boston Nationals. Lawson did not play minor league ball before signing with Boston, as he made the jump from the University of North Carolina right to the majors. In his rookie season, he appeared in six games, finishing with a 2–2 record with a 3.33 E.R.A. Lawson played the next season for the Baltimore Orioles. Appearing in just three games, he went 0–2 with an E.R.A. of 4.85. Lawson pitched what would be his final game in the major leagues, coming in relief of starter Harry Howell. Lawson gave up three hits in three innings, but did not allow a run in Baltimore's 10–6 loss to the Cleveland Blues.

== Personal life ==
Lawson, after being released by Baltimore, returned to college and earned his medical degree. Lawson also coached the Tar Heels baseball team, but would end up making what would turn out to be a lasting impact in another sport. Lawson is believed to be the one responsible for North Carolina starting a basketball. Lawson had learned about the game from the works of Dr. James Naismith. In 1911, Lawson supposedly intro the game in his physical education class. The popularity of the sport grew from there.
