= Frank Murphy (baseball) =

American baseball player (1876-1912)

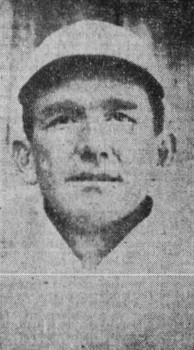
- Outfielder / Second baseman
- Born: April 6, 1876; Sleepy Hollow, New York, U.S.
- Died: November 4, 1912 (aged 36); Central Islip, New York, U.S.
- Batted: Right Threw: Right

MLB debut
- July 2, 1901, for the Boston Beaneaters

Last MLB appearance
- October 5, 1901, for the New York Giants

MLB statistics
- Batting average: .219
- Home runs: 1
- Runs batted in: 26
- Stats at Baseball Reference

Teams
- Boston Beaneaters (1901); New York Giants (1901)

Francis Patrick Murphy (April 6, 1876 – November 4, 1912) was an American outfielder in Major League Baseball who played for the Boston Beaneaters and New York Giants in 1901. He went to college at Fordham University. Murphy was 25 years old when he broke into the big leagues on July 2, 1901, with the Boston Beaneaters.
