= Joe Rickert =

American baseball player (1876–1943)

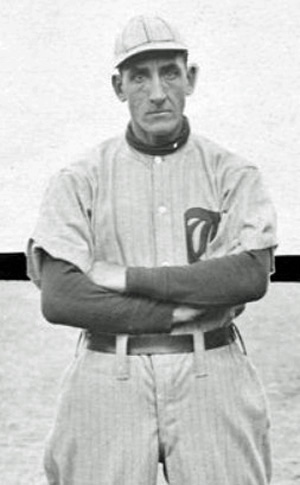
- Outfielder
- Born: December 12, 1876; London, Ohio, U.S.
- Died: October 15, 1943 (aged 66); Springfield, Ohio, U.S.
- Batted: Right Threw: Right

MLB debut
- October 12, 1898, for the Pittsburgh Pirates

Last MLB appearance
- October 5, 1901, for the Boston Beaneaters

MLB statistics
- Games played: 15
- At bats: 66
- Hits: 11
- Stats at Baseball Reference

Teams
- Pittsburgh Pirates (1898); Boston Beaneaters (1901)

Joseph Francis Rickert (December 12, 1876 – October 15, 1943) was an American outfielder in Major League Baseball. He played for the Pittsburgh Pirates in 1898 and the Boston Beaneaters in 1901. he also managed the New Orleans Pelicans in 1903.
