= Gene DeMontreville =

American baseball player (1873–1935)

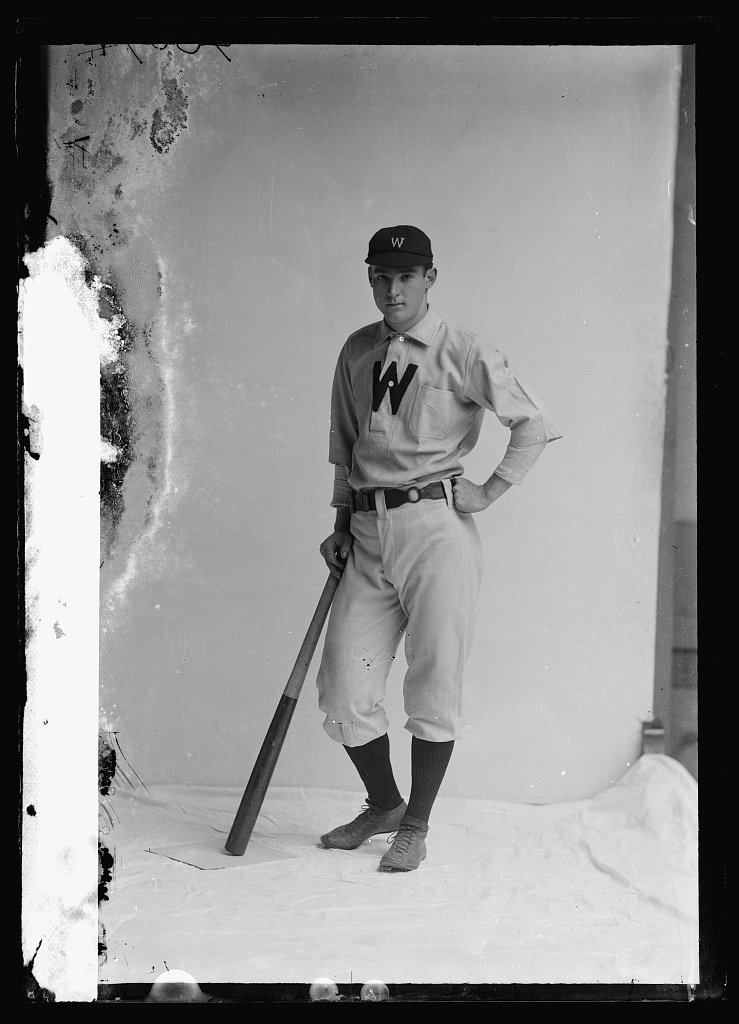
- DeMontreville in 1895
- Second baseman / Shortstop
- Born: March 10, 1873; St. Paul, Minnesota, U.S.
- Died: February 18, 1935 (aged 61); Memphis, Tennessee, U.S.
- Batted: Right Threw: Right

MLB debut
- August 20, 1894, for the Pittsburgh Pirates

Last MLB appearance
- April 26, 1904, for the St. Louis Browns

MLB statistics
- Batting average: .303
- Home runs: 17
- Runs batted in: 497
- Stats at Baseball Reference

Teams
- Pittsburgh Pirates (1894); Washington Senators (1895–1897); Baltimore Orioles (1898–1899); Chicago Orphans (1899); Brooklyn Superbas (1900); Boston Beaneaters (1901–1902); Washington Senators (1903); St. Louis Browns (1904)

Eugene Napoleon DeMontreville (March 10, 1873 – February 18, 1935) was an American professional baseball second baseman and shortstop. He played in Major League Baseball (MLB) for the Pittsburgh Pirates, Washington Senators, Baltimore Orioles, Chicago Orphans, Brooklyn Superbas, Boston Beaneaters, Washington Senators, and St. Louis Browns between 1894 and 1904.

DeMontreville had a 36-game hitting streak from 1896 to 1897. When the streak was discovered in 2007, it was the tenth-longest hitting streak in MLB history.

== Career ==
In 922 games over 11 seasons, DeMontreville posted a .303 batting average (1,096-for-3,615) with 537 runs, 17 home runs, 497 runs batted in (RBIs) and 228 stolen bases. He recorded a .921 fielding percentage playing at second and third base and shortstop. He was accomplished at the baserunning technique known as the delayed steal.

DeMontreville had a hitting streak over the last 17 games of 1896 and the first 19 games of 1897. This streak was not discovered until 2007, and at that time there were only nine longer hitting streaks in MLB history.

A heavy drinker, DeMontreville was prone to fighting and missing curfews. He did not remain on any major league team for more than three seasons.

DeMontreville's younger brother Lee DeMontreville was also an MLB player, spending one season with the St. Louis Cardinals.

== Later life ==
DeMontreville served the Mid-South Fair in Memphis, Tennessee from 1908–1935 as the concession manager and superintendent. Dealing with a fire on February 18, 1935, DeMontreville suddenly became ill, entering the building in a stumbling fashion and collapsed. DeMontreville's assistants took them into a car and began driving him to a local hospital. He sooned regained consciousness and instead of the hospital, asked to be moved to his house, which was located on fair property. Although a colleague called for medical assistance, DeMontreville died before he could be examined. Funeral services were held in Memphis before his body would be placed on a Southern Railroad train to Washington D.C., where it would be buried.

== See also ==
- List of Major League Baseball career stolen bases leaders
