= Ed Stein (baseball) =

American baseball player (1869–1928)

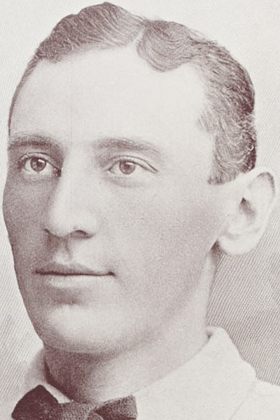
- Pitcher
- Born: September 5, 1869; Detroit, Michigan, U.S.
- Died: May 10, 1928 (aged 58); Detroit, Michigan, U.S.
- Batted: Right Threw: Right

MLB debut
- July 24, 1890, for the Chicago Colts

Last MLB appearance
- June 27, 1898, for the Brooklyn Bridegrooms

MLB statistics
- Win–loss record: 109–78
- Earned run average: 3.97
- Strikeouts: 535
- Stats at Baseball Reference

Teams
- Chicago Colts (1890–1891); Brooklyn Grooms/Bridegrooms (1892–1898)

Edward F. Stein (September 5, 1869 – May 12, 1928) was an American Major League Baseball player who pitched for the Chicago Colts and Brooklyn Grooms/Bridegrooms of the National League from 1890 to 1898.

== Career ==
=== Chicago ===
Hailing from Detroit, Michigan, Stein began his major league career with the Colts, winning 12 of the 20 games he pitched as the team went on to a second-place finish behind the Brooklyn Bridegrooms. The following season, he pitched in fewer games, winning 7 of the 14 games he pitched that year, as the Colts again finished second, but this time behind the Boston Beaneaters.

=== Brooklyn ===
It was in Brooklyn where Stein enjoyed his greatest success. He made an immediate impact, winning 27 games that season, and 87 games total during his first four seasons in Brooklyn, including another 26 win season in 1894.

On June 2, 1894, Stein pitched a rain-shortened six inning no-hit game against the Beaneaters, a 1–0 victory at the Bridegrooms home field, Eastern Park. Due to subsequent rule changes since, it is not officially recognized as a no-hitter because he did not pitch at least nine innings.

=== Umpire ===
Stein was used as a substitute umpire for four games in his career. The first was on July 24, 1890. The second in 1894, and two more in 1896. In all of his games, he was the only umpire on the field.

== Post-career ==
He was sheriff of Wayne County, Michigan twice, and also served two terms as treasurer of the city of Detroit. Stein died in his hometown of Detroit at the age of 58, and is interred at Elmwood Cemetery.

Preceded by Dave Foutz	Brooklyn Grooms; Opening Day starting pitcher 1893	Succeeded by Brickyard Kennedy
