= Farmer Burns (baseball) =

American baseball player

- Pitcher
- Born: June 2, 1876; Ashtabula, Ohio
- Died: unknown
- Threw: Right

MLB debut
- July 6, 1901, for the St. Louis Cardinals

Last MLB appearance
- October 15, 1901, for the St. Louis Cardinals

MLB statistics
- ERA: 9.0
- Games: 1
- Stats at Baseball Reference

Teams
- St. Louis Cardinals (1901)

James Joseph "Farmer" Burns (June 2, 1876 – ?) was a major league baseball player who pitched for the St. Louis Cardinals in 1901. He had previously attended Washington and Jefferson College, where he was a strong starting pitcher in 1898 for their team, "The Presidents," though he never graduated.
