= Jim Miller (infielder) =

American baseball player (1880-1937)

- Second baseman
- Born: October 2, 1880; Pittsburgh, Pennsylvania, U.S.
- Died: February 7, 1937 (aged 56); Pittsburgh, Pennsylvania, U.S.
- Batted: Right Threw: Right

MLB debut
- September 9, 1901, for the New York Giants

Last MLB appearance
- September 30, 1901, for the New York Giants

MLB statistics
- Batting average: .138
- Hits: 8
- Runs batted in: 3
- Stats at Baseball Reference

Teams
- New York Giants (1901)

James McCurdy "Rabbit" Miller (October 2, 1880 – February 7, 1937) was an American Major League Baseball infielder for the New York Giants in 1901.
