= Frank Gatins =

American baseball player (1871–1911)

- Third baseman
- Born: March 6, 1871; Johnstown, Pennsylvania, U.S.
- Died: November 8, 1911 (aged 40); Johnstown, Pennsylvania, U.S.
- Batted: Unknown Threw: Unknown

MLB debut
- September 21, 1898, for the Washington Senators

Last MLB appearance
- July 15, 1901, for the Brooklyn Superbas

MLB statistics
- Batting average: .227
- Home runs: 1
- Runs batted in: 26
- Stats at Baseball Reference

Teams
- Washington Senators (1898); Brooklyn Superbas (1901)

Frank Anthony Gatins (March 6, 1871 – November 8, 1911) was an American third baseman and shortstop in Major League Baseball. Born in Johnstown, Pennsylvania, he appeared in 17 games for the Washington Senators in the 1898 season and 50 games for the Brooklyn Superbas in 1901 and 1902.
