= Eddie Hickey (baseball) =

American baseball player (1872-1941)

- Third baseman
- Born: August 18, 1872; Cleveland, Ohio, U.S.
- Died: March 25, 1941 (aged 68); Tacoma, Washington, U.S.
- Batted: Unknown Threw: Unknown

MLB debut
- September 3, 1901, for the Chicago Orphans

Last MLB appearance
- September 23, 1901, for the Chicago Orphans

MLB statistics
- Batting average: .162
- Home runs: 0
- Runs batted in: 3
- Stats at Baseball Reference

Teams
- Chicago Orphans (1901)

Edward A. Hickey (August 18, 1872 – March 25, 1941) was an American third baseman in Major League Baseball who played briefly for the Chicago Orphans during the 1901 season. He was born in Cleveland, Ohio.

In a one-season career, Hickey posted a .162 batting average (6-for-37) with four runs and three RBI in 10 games, including one stolen base, and did not have an extra-base hit.

Hickey died in Tacoma, Washington, at the age of 68.
