= Cozy Dolan (1900s outfielder) =

American baseball player (1873–1907)

- Right fielder / First baseman / Pitcher
- Born: January 9, 1873; Athlone, Ireland
- Died: March 29, 1907 (aged 34); Louisville, Kentucky, U.S.
- Batted: Left Threw: Left

MLB debut
- April 26, 1895, for the Boston Beaneaters

Last MLB appearance
- October 5, 1906, for the Boston Beaneaters

MLB statistics
- Batting average: .269
- Hits: 855
- Home runs: 10
- Runs batted in: 315
- Stats at Baseball Reference

Teams
- Boston Beaneaters (1895–1896); Chicago Orphans (1900–1901); Brooklyn Superbas (1901–1902); Chicago White Sox (1903); Cincinnati Reds (1903–1905); Boston Beaneaters (1905–1906)

Patrick Henry "Cozy" Dolan (January 9, 1873 – March 29, 1907) was an American professional baseball right fielder, first baseman and pitcher. He played in Major League Baseball (MLB) for the Boston Beaneaters, Chicago Orphans, Brooklyn Superbas, Chicago White Sox and Cincinnati Reds between 1895 and 1906. Born in Athlone, Ireland, he fell ill during spring training in 1907 and died in Louisville, Kentucky, of typhoid fever soon afterwards.

Massachusetts manifest records for the passenger ship Siberia contain an infant Patrick Dolan who arrived in Boston with another Patrick Dolan, likely his father, on June 20, 1874. US census records for 1900 show Dolan with the profession "Ball Player," using a stated birth location as "Massachusetts" and age of 24, about three years younger than what Irish birth records reflect.

== See also ==
- List of Major League Baseball players from Ireland
- List of baseball players who died during their careers
