= Larry Hesterfer =

American baseball player (1878-1943)

- Pitcher
- Born: June 9, 1878; Newark, New Jersey
- Died: September 22, 1943 (aged 65); Bloomfield, New Jersey
- Batted: Right Threw: Left

MLB debut
- September 5, 1901, for the New York Giants

Last MLB appearance
- September 5, 1901, for the New York Giants

MLB statistics
- Win–loss record: 0-1
- Earned run average: 7.50
- Strikeouts: 2
- Stats at Baseball Reference

Teams
- New York Giants (1901)

Lawrence Hesterfer (June 9, 1878 – September 22, 1943) was a Major League Baseball pitcher who played in 1901 with the New York Giants.

Born in Newark, New Jersey, Hersterfer was a life-long resident of neighboring Bloomfield, New Jersey.

He is the only player known to have hit into a triple play in his first major league at bat. Facing the Pittsburgh Pirates, Hesterfer came to bat with the bases loaded and no outs. The triple play was a sharp line drive grabbed by the shortstop, Honus Wagner, for the first out; he stepped on second base for the second out and threw to first to complete the triple play.
