= Chauncey Fisher =

American baseball player (1872–1939)

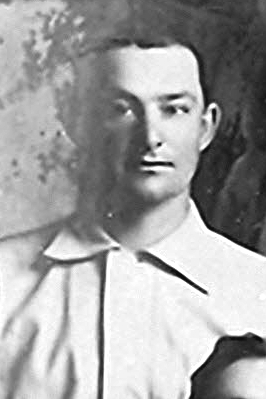
- Pitcher
- Born: January 8, 1872; Anderson, Indiana, U.S.
- Died: April 27, 1939 (aged 67); Los Angeles, California, U.S.
- Batted: Right Threw: Right

MLB debut
- September 20, 1893, for the Cleveland Spiders

Last MLB appearance
- July 6, 1901, for the St. Louis Cardinals

MLB statistics
- Win–loss record: 21–26
- Earned run average: 5.37
- Strikeouts: 80
- Stats at Baseball Reference

Teams
- Cleveland Spiders (1893–1894); Cincinnati Reds (1894, 1896); Brooklyn Bridegrooms (1897); New York Giants (1901); St. Louis Cardinals (1901)

Chauncey Burr Fisher (January 8, 1872 – April 27, 1939) was a 19th-century American Major League Baseball (MLB) pitcher. Fisher pitched in the National League from 1893 to 1901.
