= Lefty Davis =

American baseball player (1875–1919)

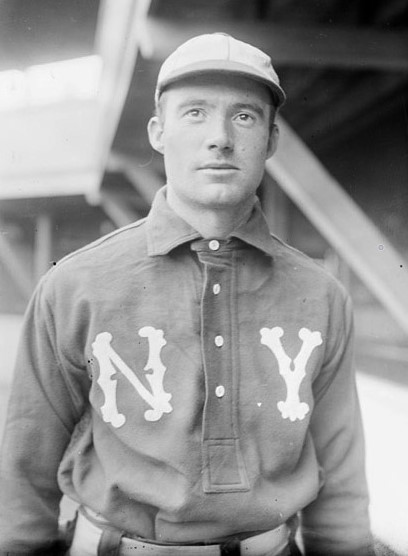
- Davis in 1903
- Outfielder
- Born: February 4, 1875; Nashville, Tennessee, U.S.
- Died: February 4, 1919 (aged 44); Collins, New York, U.S.
- Batted: Left Threw: Left

MLB debut
- April 18, 1901, for the Brooklyn Superbas

Last MLB appearance
- July 16, 1907, for the Cincinnati Reds

MLB statistics
- Batting average: .261
- Home runs: 3
- Runs batted in: 110
- Stats at Baseball Reference

Teams
- Brooklyn Superbas (1901); Pittsburgh Pirates (1901–1902); New York Highlanders (1903); Cincinnati Reds (1907)

Alphonso DeFord Davis (February 4, 1875 – February 4, 1919) was an American professional baseball outfielder. He played in Major League Baseball (MLB) from 1901 to 1907 for the Brooklyn Superbas, Pittsburgh Pirates, New York Highlanders, and Cincinnati Reds.

In 348 games over four seasons, Davis posted a .261 batting average (338-for-1296) with 232 runs, 3 home runs, 110 runs batted in, 65 stolen bases, and 167 bases on balls. He recorded a .940 fielding percentage in his major league career.
