= Pete Childs =

American baseball player (1871–1922)

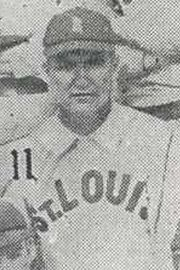
- Second baseman
- Born: November 15, 1871; Philadelphia, Pennsylvania, U.S.
- Died: February 15, 1922 (aged 50); Philadelphia, Pennsylvania, U.S.
- Batted: Unknown Threw: Right

MLB debut
- April 24, 1901, for the St. Louis Cardinals

Last MLB appearance
- October 3, 1902, for the Philadelphia Phillies

MLB statistics
- Batting average: .212
- Home runs: 0
- Runs batted in: 47
- Stats at Baseball Reference

Teams
- St. Louis Cardinals (1901); Chicago Orphans (1901); Philadelphia Phillies (1902)

Peter Pierre Childs (November 15, 1871 – February 15, 1922) was an American infielder in Major League Baseball in 1901 and 1902. He played for the St. Louis Cardinals, Chicago Orphans, and the Philadelphia Phillies.
