= Ed Doheny =

American baseball player (1873–1916)

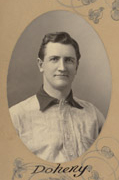
- Pitcher
- Born: November 24, 1873; Northfield, Vermont, U.S.
- Died: December 29, 1916 (aged 43); Medfield, Massachusetts, U.S.
- Batted: Left Threw: Left

MLB debut
- September 16, 1895, for the New York Giants

Last MLB appearance
- September 7, 1903, for the Pittsburgh Pirates

MLB statistics
- Win–loss record: 75–83
- Earned run average: 3.73
- Strikeouts: 572
- Stats at Baseball Reference

Teams
- New York Giants (1895–1901); Pittsburgh Pirates (1901–1903)

Edward Richard Doheny (November 24, 1873 – December 29, 1916) was an American pitcher in Major League Baseball (MLB). He played for the New York Giants and Pittsburgh Pirates from 1895 to 1903. Doheny finished his career with a win–loss record of 75–83. During his last MLB season, he was declared insane and committed to an asylum.

== Baseball career ==
Doheny was born in Northfield, Vermont, in 1873. He started his professional baseball career with the New York Giants of the National League (NL) in 1895. He signed with the team in September, and that year, he had a win–loss record of 0–3 and a 6.66 earned run average (ERA).

In 1896, Doheny went 6–7 with a 4.49 ERA. In 1897, he went 4–4 with a 2.12 ERA. In 1898, Doheny went 7–19 with a 3.68 ERA and led the NL with 19 wild pitches. In 1899, he went 14–17 with a 4.41 ERA and led the NL with 37 hit by pitches and 21 wild pitches. In 1900, he went 4–14 with a 5.45 ERA. In 1901, he went 2–5 with a 4.50 ERA before the Giants released him in July.

Later that month, Doheny signed with the NL's Pittsburgh Pirates. During the rest of the year, he went 6–2 with a 2.00 ERA and helped the Pirates win the NL championship. In 1902, he went 16–4 with a 2.53 ERA and helped the Pirates win the NL championship again.

== 1903 season ==
In May 1903, in an away game against the New York Giants, Doheny popped up and then threw his bat in the direction of Giants catcher Frank Bowerman, angering the crowd. For this, Doheny was suspended for three days.

In July, Doheny left the Pirates and returned to his home in Andover, Massachusetts. He had been acting strangely and was convinced that he was being followed by detectives. As the Pittsburg Post noted on July 29, "his mind is thought to be deranged".

Doheny returned to the team in August. He pitched well and ended the season with a record of 16–8 and a 3.19 ERA, helping the Pirates win the NL championship. He played his last game on September 7. Doheny continued to suffer from paranoid delusions, and on September 22, his brother took him back home to Andover.

Doheny was then placed under the care of Dr. E. C. Conroy and a nurse, Oberlin Howarth. Doheny's condition did not improve and was worsened after he read about the Pirates' fourth loss in the 1903 World Series. On the night of October 10, he forcibly removed Conroy from his home. Early the next morning, Doheny attacked Howarth with a cast-iron stove leg and knocked him unconscious. The police arrived, and Doheny held them off while threatening to kill anyone who approached. After an hour, the police finally overpowered him. Doheny was declared insane by doctors and committed to an asylum in Danvers, Massachusetts.

Doheny finished his nine-year MLB career with a 75–83 record, a 3.73 ERA, and 572 strikeouts. He never recovered from his mental illness and died in an asylum in Medfield, Massachusetts, in 1916.

== See also ==
- List of Major League Baseball career hit batsmen leaders
