= Hughie Hearne =

American baseball player (1873-1932)

- Catcher
- Born: April 18, 1873; Troy, New York, U.S.
- Died: September 22, 1932 (aged 59); Troy, New York, U.S.
- Batted: Right Threw: Right

MLB debut
- August 29, 1901, for the Brooklyn Superbas

Last MLB appearance
- July 2, 1903, for the Brooklyn Superbas

MLB statistics
- Batting average: .283
- Home runs: 0
- Runs batted in: 35
- Stats at Baseball Reference

Teams
- Brooklyn Superbas (1901–1903)

Hugh Joseph Hearne (April 18, 1873 – September 22, 1932) was an American catcher in Major League Baseball. He played for the Brooklyn Superbas from 1901 to 1903. Hearne stood at 5 ft 8 in (1.73 m) and weighed 182 lbs.

== Career ==
Hughie Hearne started playing baseball as early as 1896 and was with the New York State League's Albany Senators from 1899 to 1901. In 1901, he started off hot at the plate and batted .380 to lead the entire league by 30 points. He was then acquired by the Brooklyn Superbas.

Hearne made his major league debut on August 29 and spent the next two years with Brooklyn as a part-time catcher. In 1902, he played in a career-high 66 MLB games and batted .281. In 1903, while batting .281 again, he was traded to the Baltimore Orioles of the Eastern League. He played his last major league game on July 2.

Hearne spent 1903 to 1909 with Baltimore. In 1905, he hit .302, the only season other than 1901 in which he would top the .300 mark. In 1907, he was reported to be wearing shin guards similar to those that had been worn by Roger Bresnahan before. This piece of equipment was rarely used in baseball at the time.

After batting .250 in 1909, Hearne was sold to the Newark Indians for US$500. He played in a career-high 94 minor league games in 1910 before retiring from professional baseball.

== Personal ==
Hughie Hearne was born in Troy, New York.

Hearne died in 1932, at the age of 59, in Troy, New York. He was buried in St. Mary Cemetery. After his death, the Schenectady Gazette ran an obituary which stated that Hearne was a "well known baseball star of former days" and "one of the game's best catchers," despite the fact that the most major league games he ever played in a season was 66 in 1902.
