= 1901 Major League Baseball season =

1901 MLB season
- League: American League (AL); National League (NL)
- Sport: Baseball
- Duration: April 24 – September 28, 1901 (AL); April 18 – October 6, 1901 (NL)
- Games: 140
- Teams: 16 (8 per league)

Pennant winners
- AL champions: Chicago White Stockings
- AL runners-up: Boston Americans
- NL champions: Pittsburgh Pirates
- NL runners-up: Philadelphia Phillies

MLB seasons
- ← 1900 1902 →

Locations of teams for the 1901 American League season
American League
Locations of teams for the 1900–1901 National League seasons
National League

The 1901 major league baseball season was contested from April 18 through October 6, 1901. It was the inaugural major league season for the American League (AL) (having previously been the minor league Western League), with the Chicago White Stockings winning the AL pennant. In the National League (NL), in operation since 1876, the Pittsburgh Pirates won the NL pennant. There was no postseason. This was the first season of the modern era.

This would be the only season in which the Milwaukee Brewers played, as the team would relocate to St. Louis, Missouri for the following season as the St. Louis Browns (before that team relocated to Baltimore, Maryland as the modern Baltimore Orioles in 1954, where they remain to this day. The Baltimore Orioles of this season would fold following the 1902 season).

== Schedule ==
The 1901 schedule consisted of 140 games for all teams in the American League and National League, each of which had eight teams. Each team was scheduled to play 20 games against the other seven teams of their respective league. This format had previously been used by the National League during their 1888–1891 seasons. This format would last until 1904, which saw an increase of games played.

National League Opening Day took place on April 18 with a game between the Brooklyn Superbas and the Philadelphia Phillies, while American League Opening Day did not take place until April 24, with a game between the Chicago White Stockings and the Cleveland Bluebirds. The American League would see its final day of the season on September 28, while the National League would see its final day of the season on October 6.

== Rule changes ==
On February 27, 1901, the National League Rules Committee announced several rule changes, effective immediately.

- All foul balls are to count as strike balls, except after two strikes. Previously, foul balls would not affect the count. To cut the cost of lost foul balls, the committee urges that batters who foul off good strikes are to be disciplined. The American League will not adopt this rule until the 1903 season.
- A one-ball penalty would be imposed if the pitcher throws a warm-up toss to anyone except the catcher.
- Catchers play within 10 feet of the batter.
- A ball will be called if the pitcher does not throw to a ready and waiting batter within 20 seconds, a predecessor to the modern-day pitch clock that was implemented 123 years later in 2023.
- Players using indecent or improper language will be banished by the umpire.
- A ball will be called when a batter is hit by a pitch.

Further changes were made in April:

- In a mail vote, the owners rescinded the new hit by pitch rule, restoring the rule that a HBP will earn a batter first base.

== Teams ==
League	Team	City	Ballpark	Capacity	Manager
American League	Baltimore Orioles	Baltimore, Maryland	Oriole Park	Unknown	John McGraw
American League	Boston Americans	Boston, Massachusetts	Huntington Avenue Grounds	11,500	Jimmy Collins
American League	Chicago White Stockings	Chicago, Illinois	South Side Park	12,500	Clark Griffith
American League	Cleveland Blues	Cleveland, Ohio	League Park (Cleveland)	9,000	Jimmy McAleer
American League	Detroit Tigers	Detroit, Michigan	Bennett Park	8,500	George Stallings
American League	Milwaukee Brewers	Milwaukee, Wisconsin	Lloyd Street Grounds	10,000	Hugh Duffy
American League	Philadelphia Athletics	Philadelphia, Pennsylvania	Columbia Park	9,500	Connie Mack
American League	Washington Senators	Washington, D.C.	American League Park	7,000	Jim Manning
National League	Boston Beaneaters	Boston, Massachusetts	South End Grounds	6,600	Frank Selee
National League	Brooklyn Superbas	New York, New York	Washington Park	12,000	Ned Hanlon
National League	Chicago Orphans	Chicago, Illinois	West Side Park	13,000	Tom Loftus
National League	Cincinnati Reds	Cincinnati, Ohio	League Park (Cincinnati)	9,000	Bid McPhee
National League	New York Giants	New York, New York	Polo Grounds	16,000	George Davis
National League	Philadelphia Phillies	Philadelphia, Pennsylvania	National League Park	18,000	Bill Shettsline
National League	Pittsburgh Pirates	Allegheny, Pennsylvania	Exposition Park	16,000	Fred Clarke
National League	St. Louis Cardinals	St. Louis, Missouri	League Park (St. Louis)	15,200	Patsy Donovan

=== Sunday games ===
Blue laws restricted Sunday activities in several localities, causing several teams to play at ballparks in a different locality.

Team	City	Ballpark	Capacity	Games played
Detroit Tigers	Springwells Township, Michigan	Burns Park	3,700	13

1. In today's Pittsburgh, Pennsylvania.
2. In today's Detroit, Michigan.

== Standings ==
=== American League ===
American League
Team	W	L	Pct.	GB	Home	Road
Chicago White Stockings	83	53	.610	—	49‍–‍21	34‍–‍32
Boston Americans	79	57	.581	4	49‍–‍20	30‍–‍37
Detroit Tigers	74	61	.548	8½	42‍–‍27	32‍–‍34
Philadelphia Athletics	74	62	.544	9	42‍–‍24	32‍–‍38
Baltimore Orioles	68	65	.511	13½	40‍–‍25	28‍–‍40
Washington Senators	61	72	.459	20½	31‍–‍35	30‍–‍37
Cleveland Blues	54	82	.397	29	28‍–‍39	26‍–‍43
Milwaukee Brewers	48	89	.350	35½	32‍–‍37	16‍–‍52

=== National League ===
National League
Team	W	L	Pct.	GB	Home	Road
Pittsburgh Pirates	90	49	.647	—	45‍–‍24	45‍–‍25
Philadelphia Phillies	83	57	.593	7½	46‍–‍23	37‍–‍34
Brooklyn Superbas	79	57	.581	9½	43‍–‍25	36‍–‍32
St. Louis Cardinals	76	64	.543	14½	40‍–‍31	36‍–‍33
Boston Beaneaters	69	69	.500	20½	41‍–‍29	28‍–‍40
Chicago Orphans	53	86	.381	37	30‍–‍39	23‍–‍47
New York Giants	52	85	.380	37	30‍–‍38	22‍–‍47
Cincinnati Reds	52	87	.374	38	27‍–‍43	25‍–‍44

=== Tie games ===
15 tie games (8 in AL, 7 in NL), which are not factored into winning percentage or games behind (and were often replayed again), occurred throughout the season.

==== American League ====
- Baltimore Orioles, 2
- Boston Americans, 2
- Chicago White Stockings, 1
- Cleveland Blues, 2
- Detroit Tigers, 1
- Milwaukee Brewers, 2
- Philadelphia Athletics, 1
- Washington Senators, 5

==== National League ====
- Boston Beaneaters, 2
- Brooklyn Superbas, 1
- Chicago Orphans, 1
- Cincinnati Reds, 3
- New York Giants, 4
- Pittsburgh Pirates, 1
- St. Louis Cardinals, 2

== Managerial changes ==
=== Off-season ===
Team	Former Manager	New Manager
Baltimore Orioles	Team enfranchised	John McGraw
Boston Americans	Team enfranchised	Jimmy Collins
Chicago White Stockings	Charles Comiskey (minor league)	Clark Griffith
Cincinnati Reds	Bob Allen	Bid McPhee
Cleveland Blues	Jimmy McAleer (minor league)	Jimmy McAleer
Detroit Tigers	George Stallings (minor league)	George Stallings
Milwaukee Brewers	Connie Mack (minor league)	Hugh Duffy
Philadelphia Athletics	Team enfranchised	Connie Mack
St. Louis Cardinals	Louie Heilbroner	Patsy Donovan
Washington Senators	Jim Manning (Kansas City Blues, minor league)	Jim Manning

== League leaders ==
Any team shown in small text indicates a previous team a player was on during the season.

=== American League ===
Hitting leaders
Stat	Player	Total
AVG	Nap Lajoie^{1} (PHA)	.426
OPS	Nap Lajoie (PHA)	1.106
HR	Nap Lajoie^{1} (PHA)	14
RBI	Nap Lajoie^{1} (PHA)	125
R	Nap Lajoie (PHA)	145
H	Nap Lajoie (PHA)	232
SB	Frank Isbell (CWS)	46

^{1} American League Triple Crown batting winner

Pitching leaders
Stat	Player	Total
W	Cy Young^{2} (BOS)	33
L	Pete Dowling (CLE/MIL)	25
ERA	Cy Young^{2} (BOS)	1.62
K	Cy Young^{2} (BOS)	158
IP	Joe McGinnity (BLA)	382.0
SV	Bill Hoffer (CLE)	3
WHIP	Cy Young (BOS)	0.972

^{2} American League Triple Crown pitching winner

=== National League ===
Hitting leaders
Stat	Player	Total
AVG	Jesse Burkett (STL)	.376
OPS	Ed Delahanty (PHI)	.955
HR	Sam Crawford (CIN)	16
RBI	Honus Wagner (PIT)	126
R	Jesse Burkett (STL)	142
H	Jesse Burkett (STL)	142
SB	Honus Wagner (PIT)	49

Pitching leaders
Stat	Player	Total
W	Bill Donovan (BRO)	25
L	Luther Taylor (NYG)	27
ERA	Jesse Tannehill (PIT)	2.18
K	Noodles Hahn (CIN)	239
IP	Noodles Hahn (CIN)	375.1
SV	Bill Donovan (BRO); Jack Powell (STL)	3
WHIP	Al Orth (PHI)	1.001

== Milestones ==
=== Batters ===
==== Cycles ====
- Fred Clarke (PIT):
  - Clarke hit for his first cycle and second in franchise history, on July 23 against the Cincinnati Reds.
- Nap Lajoie (PHA):
  - Lajoie hit for his first cycle and first in franchise history, on July 30 against the Cleveland Blues.

==== Other batting accomplishments ====
- Billy Hamilton (BSN):
  - Recorded his 900th career stolen base against the Brooklyn Superbas on May 9. He became the first player to reach this mark.
  - Set the major league record for most career stolen bases when he stole his 914th base in game one of a doubleheader against the Chicago Orphans on September 13.
- Nap Lajoie (PHA):
  - Became the fourth player in major league history and the first in American League history to win the Triple Crown, an achievement of leading a league in batting average, home runs, and runs batted in (RBI) over the same season.

=== Pitchers ===
==== No-hitters ====
- Christy Mathewson (NYG):
  - Mathewson threw his first career no-hitter and the second no-hitter in franchise history, by defeating the St. Louis Cardinals 5–0 on July 15. Mathewson walked four and struck out four.

==== Other pitching accomplishments ====
- Cy Young (BOS):
  - Became the seventh member of the 300-win club, defeating the Philadelphia Athletics on July 12, winning 5–3.
  - Won the pitching triple crown.

== Home field attendance ==
Team name	Wins	%±	Home attendance	%±	Per game
St. Louis Cardinals	76	16.9%	379,988	40.7%	5,278
Chicago White Stockings	83		354,350		4,991
New York Giants	52	−13.3%	297,650	56.7%	4,192
Boston Americans	79		289,448		4,195
Detroit Tigers	74		259,430		3,706
Pittsburgh Pirates	90	13.9%	251,955	−4.6%	3,652
Philadelphia Phillies	83	10.7%	234,937	−22.2%	3,405
Philadelphia Athletics	74		206,329		3,126
Cincinnati Reds	52	−16.1%	205,728	21.0%	2,857
Chicago Orphans	53	−18.5%	205,071	−17.5%	2,930
Brooklyn Superbas	79	−3.7%	198,200	8.3%	2,915
Washington Senators	61		161,661		2,377
Boston Beaneaters	69	4.5%	146,502	−27.5%	2,093
Baltimore Orioles	68		141,952		2,151
Milwaukee Brewers	48		139,034		1,986
Cleveland Blues	54		131,380		1,904

== Venues ==
The 1901 season saw the American League elevated to major league status, and with it, eight new major league teams in eight venues:

- The Baltimore Orioles played at Oriole Park.
- The Boston Americans played at the Huntington Avenue Grounds.
- The Chicago White Stockings played at South Side Park.
- The Cleveland Blues played at League Park, former home of the NL Cleveland team.
- The Detroit Tigers played at Bennett Park and Sunday home games at Burns Park (playing 13 of 70 games).
- The Milwaukee Brewers played their only season at Lloyd Street Grounds, playing their final game during a doubleheader on September 12 against the Chicago White Stockings, relocating to St. Louis, Missouri at Sportsman's Park for the start of the 1902 season.
- The Philadelphia Athletics played at Columbia Park.
- The Washington Senators played at American League Park.

The Cincinnati Reds would play their final game at League Park, on October 6 during a doubleheader against the St. Louis Cardinals, moving into the Palace of the Fans for the start of the 1902 season.

== See also ==
- 1901 in baseball (Events, Births, Deaths)
