= Dummy Taylor =

American baseball player (1875–1958)

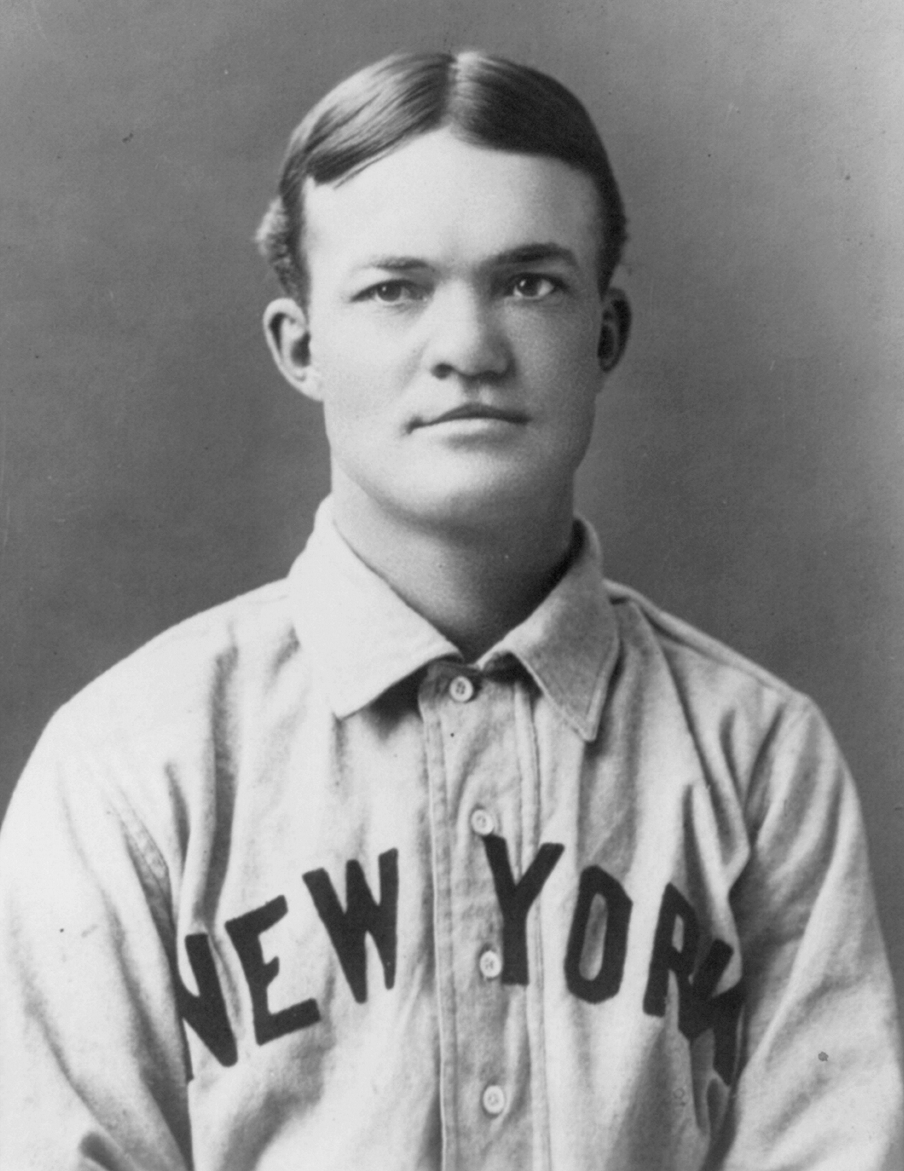
- Taylor in 1903
- Pitcher
- Born: February 21, 1875; Oskaloosa, Kansas, U.S.
- Died: August 22, 1958 (aged 83); Jacksonville, Illinois, U.S.
- Batted: Right Threw: Right

MLB debut
- August 27, 1900, for the New York Giants

Last MLB appearance
- September 29, 1908, for the New York Giants

MLB statistics
- Win–loss record: 116–106
- Earned run average: 2.75
- Strikeouts: 767
- Stats at Baseball Reference

Teams
- New York Giants (1900–1901); Cleveland Bronchos (1902); New York Giants (1902–1908)

Luther Haden "Dummy" Taylor (February 21, 1875 – August 22, 1958) was an American right-handed pitcher in Major League Baseball from 1900 to 1908 who was deaf. He played for the New York Giants and Cleveland Bronchos and was one of the key pitchers on the Giants' National League championship teams of 1904 and 1905.

In 1901, his first full season in the major leagues, Taylor led the National League by pitching in 45 games and ranked second in the league with 37 complete games. In 1904, he won 21 games for the Giants, and in 1906 his 2.20 earned run average was the lowest on a pitching staff that included Baseball Hall of Famers Christy Mathewson (2.97), and "Iron Man" Joe McGinnity (2.25).

Taylor was the only successful deaf pitcher in Major League Baseball and was regarded, along with Dummy Hoy, as a role model and hero for hearing impaired Americans in the early 20th century. In the 1900s, Taylor was reported to be the highest paid deaf person in the United States. He was also known as the comedian of the Giants teams, waving a lit lantern when an umpire refused to call a game due to darkness and coaching at third base in rubber boots when an umpire refused to call a game due to rain.

In 2000, author Darryl Brock wrote the historical novel Havana Heat about Taylor's experience in professional baseball. The book won the Dave Moore Award in 2000 as the "most important baseball book" published that year.

== Early years ==
Taylor was born in Oskaloosa, Kansas in 1875. He was the son of Arnold B. Taylor, a farmer, and his wife, Emaline (Chapman) Taylor. At the time of the 1880 United States census, Taylor was living in rural Jefferson County, Kansas with his parents, two older brothers, and two older sisters. Some accounts indicate Taylor was born deaf. However, at age four, Taylor was not listed as being "deaf and dumb" or otherwise disabled in the family's U.S. Census record. By age 10, Taylor was living at the Kansas School for the Deaf in Olathe, Kansas. He was listed in the 1885 Kansas State Census as a pupil at the Deaf and Dumb Institute.

Taylor continued to live at the Kansas School for the Deaf through his high school years. He was a pitcher for the school baseball team and also participated in boxing. Interviewed in 1942, Taylor recalled he had dreams as a boy of becoming a great boxer, but his parents objected. At the time of the 1895 Kansas State Census, Taylor was living in Olathe.

== Semi-pro and minor league baseball ==
After leaving the Kansas School for the Deaf, Taylor began playing semi-pro baseball with a team in Nevada, Missouri. He then played at Lincoln, Illinois, and with minor league teams in Wabash, Crawfordsville, Danville and Terre Haute, Indiana. In 1897, he played for a minor league team in Mattoon, Illinois. He played for the Shreveport Tigers of the Southern League in 1898 and 1899.

In 1900, Taylor began the season playing for Albany, New York. At the time of the U.S. Census in June 1900, Taylor was residing at a boarding house in Albany; his occupation was listed as a printer.

== Major League Baseball ==
=== First stint with Giants ===
In August 1900, Taylor was called up to the major leagues to play for the New York Giants. He made his major league debut on August 28, 1900. In his first game for the Giants, five Boston players tried to take advantage of Taylor's deafness by trying to steal third base. Interviewed in 1942, Taylor recalled with pride, "I nailed each one. I walked over to (Herman) Long, the last man caught, and let him know by signs I could hear him stealing." Appearing in 11 games for the 1900 Giants, Taylor compiled a 4–3 record with a 2.45 earned run average.

In his second season in the major leagues, Taylor was a workhorse for the 1901 Giants. He led the National League with 43 games started and by appearing in a total of 45 games. He also ranked second in the league with 37 complete games, 353 1/3 innings pitched, and 1,518 batters faced. Despite maintaining a respectable 3.18 earned run average, Taylor played for a weak-hitting Giants team that finished seventh out of eight teams in hits and runs produced. With the absence of run support, Taylor finished the season with a win–loss record of 18–27. His 27 losses in 1901 is tied for the second most given up by any pitcher in Major League Baseball during the 20th century (trailing Vic Willis's 29 losses in 1905).

=== Cleveland Bronchos ===
In March 1902, Taylor signed for more money with the Cleveland Bronchos of the American League. He recalled that American League teams were "waving big money at us" in the winter before the 1902 season. Taylor appeared in four games for the Bronchos, all as a starter. Despite a 1.59 earned run average, Taylor again suffered from a lack of run support and compiled a record of 1–3 in Cleveland.

=== Second stint with Giants ===
In May 1902, the Giants sent catcher Frank Bowerman to persuade Taylor to return to the Giants. Bowerman sat in the stands while Taylor was pitching and negotiated the terms of Taylor's return to the Giants by signing. Taylor recalled:

Frank sat in the grandstand and every time I walked out to the pitching mound he kept talking to me with his fingers. I kept shaking my head "No", and Frank kept boosting the money. Soon, I nodded my head "Yes", and that night I was on my way back to New York with Frank.

Taylor appeared in 26 games for the 1902 Giants and had 22 complete games. Taylor's 7–15 record for the 1902 Giants was again the result of playing for a remarkably weak-hitting team, as the 1902 Giants finished in last place in runs, hits and batting average. Even Christy Mathewson, who was Taylor's teammate on the 1902 Giants, registered a losing record in 1902 with an earned run average of 2.12 that was only marginally better than Taylor's.

In 1903, John McGraw took over as the manager of the Giants. McGraw quickly turned the Giants into one of the best teams in the National League, with Taylor, Mathewson, and Iron Man Joe McGinnity as his pitching stars. Taylor had his most successful season in 1904. With strong support from a Giants team that finished first in the National League in runs and hits, Taylor compiled a 21–15 record in 1904. He was among the National League leaders that year with 21 wins (4th), five shutouts (3rd), 1.033 walks plus hits per inning pitched (5th), 136 strikeouts (6th), and a .991 fielding percentage (2nd).

In 1905, Taylor helped lead the Giants to their second consecutive National League pennant. Taylor appeared in 32 games and compiled a record of 16–9 with a 2.66 earned run average. Taylor was scheduled to pitch in the third game of the 1905 World Series, but the game was cancelled because of rain, and Christy Mathewson pitched with an extra day of rest when the Series resumed. (Mathewson pitched three complete-game shutouts in the 1905 World Series.)

Although the Giants fell short of a third consecutive pennant in 1906, Taylor had another strong year, compiling a 17–9 record and a 2.20 earned run average. His earned run average that year was the lowest on a pitching staff that included Hall of Famers Christy Mathewson (2.97) and Joe McGinnity (2.25). Taylor also ranked 6th in the National League with a .654 winning percentage in 1906.

In 1907, Taylor went 11–7 with a 2.42 earned run average and a 1.117 walks plus hits per inning pitched. He pitched his final major league season in 1908, compiling an 8–5 record with a 2.33 earned run average.

=== Minor leagues ===
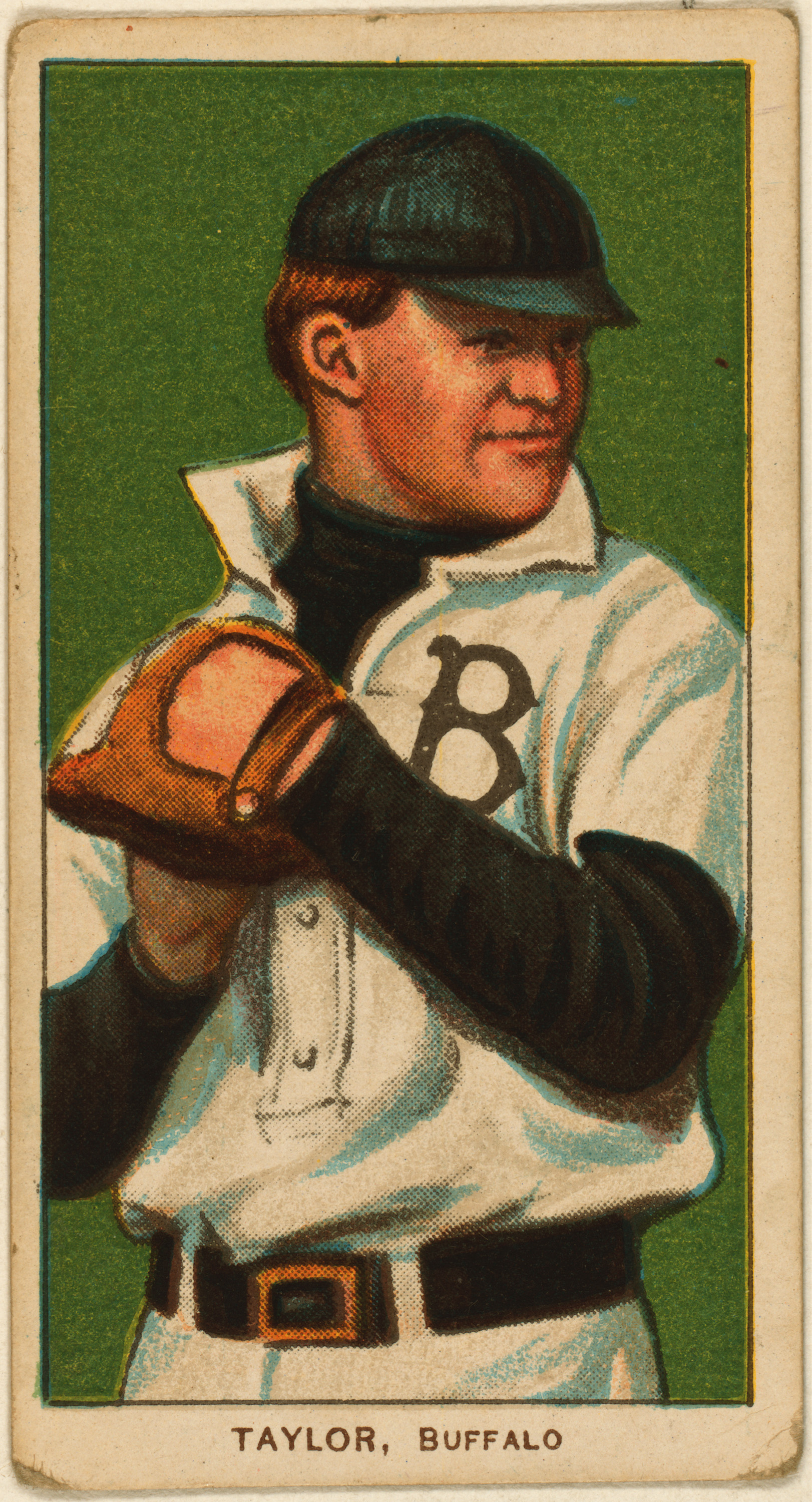
Taylor's baseball card from his time on the Bisons (T206 set)

In February 1909, Taylor was sold to the Buffalo Bisons in the Eastern League. He won 32 games for Buffalo in 1909 and 1910 and played in the minor leagues from 1909 to 1915. In his final season of organized baseball, he compiled an 18–11 record for the Utica Utes in the New York State League.

=== Overall record ===
In nine seasons in the major leagues, Taylor compiled an overall win–loss record of 116–106 and 767 strikeouts. He threw 237 complete games and 21 shutouts. He had a career earned run average of 2.75 and a career walks plus hits per inning pitched of 1.267.

=== Deafness ===
Taylor was born profoundly deaf and communicated on-field with his teammates in sign language. He is credited with helping to expand and make universal the use of sign language throughout the modern baseball infield, including but not limited to the use of pitching signs. According to Sean Lahman in his biography of Taylor, "The Giants didn't just add Taylor to their roster; they embraced him as a member of the family. Player-manager George Davis learned sign language and encouraged his players to do the same. John McGraw did likewise when he took over as Giants manager in July 1902." In Lawrence Ritter's 1966 book The Glory of Their Times, Taylor's teammate, Fred Snodgrass, recalled:

We could all read and speak the deaf-and-dumb sign language, because Dummy Taylor took it as an affront if you didn't learn to converse with him. He wanted to be one of us, to be a full-fledged member of the team. If we went to the vaudeville show, he wanted to know what the joke was, and somebody had to tell him. So we all learned. We practiced all the time.

During his eight seasons in Major League Baseball, Taylor's success won acclaim in the deaf press, including The Silent Worker, and he became a role model and hero for the deaf community. An article in The Saturday Evening Post noted that "wherever Taylor goes he will always be visited by scores of the silent fraternity among whom he is regarded as a prodigy."

On May 16, 1902, Taylor pitched against Dummy Hoy in Cincinnati, Ohio. The occasion was reported to be "the first and only time two deaf professional athletes competed against one another." When Hoy came to bat for the first time, he signed to Taylor, "I'm glad to see you." Hoy collected two hits off Taylor, but Taylor got the win as the Giants beat the Reds 5–3.

The nickname "Dummy" was commonly applied to "deaf and dumb" (deaf-mute) baseball players in the late 19th and early 20th century. Dummy Dundon and Dummy Hoy were the first professional baseball players to receive the appellation. Others include Dummy Deegan, Dummy Leitner, Herbert Murphy and Dummy Stephenson. Taylor, Deegan, and Leitner all pitched for the 1901 New York Giants. Although he accepted the nickname in his playing days, Taylor noted in a 1945 interview that he and Dummy Hoy did not care for the nickname: "In the old days Hoy and I were called Dummy. It didn't hurt us. It made us fight harder." Taylor's popularity led to an outcry in the deaf press against the use of the nickname. Alexander Pach wrote an editorial in The Silent Worker in which he protested: "The highest salaried deaf man in the United States is the much heralded Dummy Taylor—I say Dummy only to serve to show how contemptible the epithet looks."

Taylor was inducted into the American Athletic Association of the Deaf Hall of Fame in 1953. He was also inducted into the Kansas Sports Hall of Fame in 2006.

=== Reputation for clowning ===
Taylor also developed a reputation as the clown on the Giants' team of the 1900s. In April 1905, The New York Times wrote about Taylor's efforts to maintain a light atmosphere in the Giants' locker room. The Times described Taylor's post-shower wrestling matches with Frank Bowerman and his displays of the Japanese martial art, jiu-jitsu, adding:

The "Dummy" is always smiling. No matter whether in the dressing room or on the practice field he is the clown of the crowd. If a joke is told he makes Bowerman repeat it to him with his fingers. Then he emits a cacophonous cackle that passes for a laugh. "It is a good thing Taylor can't tell stories", remarked McGraw one morning, "or I never should be able to get any work out of you fellows."

On one occasion, Taylor disagreed with the decision by umpire Bill Klem not to call the game as darkness fell. Taylor returned to the clubhouse and came back onto the field wearing a fireman's oilskin and holding a lit lantern above his head. Klem yelled at Taylor to get off the field, but Taylor could not hear and continued with his antics until Klem finally called the game.

Honus Wagner later wrote about a game in which the Giants were complaining about the umpire's refusal to suspend a game due to rain. Wagner wrote, "So Dummy Taylor, one of the Giant pitchers, went out to the third base coaching lines in his hip boots and a raincoat. Then the umpire did get mad. He chased Taylor out of the park, and it was funny to see Dummy trying to explain to him that he shouldn't be ejected." Taylor later recalled that the umpire, Johnston, "not only chased me, but declared the game forfeited to the other club."

Giants' manager McGraw kept Taylor in the dugout when he was not pitching to distract the opposing pitcher. Taylor was able to emit a "rattling shriek" just as the opposing pitcher was about to release a pitch. Teammate Mike Donlin compared the noise to the "crazed shrieking of a jackass." Taylor biographer Sean Lahman wrote: "Umpire Charlie Zimmer once got so irritated with the shrill sound that he ejected Taylor, perhaps the only instance of a deaf player being tossed for being too noisy."

Taylor was also ejected from a baseball game by an umpire "for cursing him out in sign language." According to some accounts, the umpire was Hank O'Day, who knew sign language. After Taylor's tirade, O'Day reportedly stepped in front of the plate and signed the following comments back at Taylor: "Listen, smart guy ... I've spent all my spare time this past week learning your language. You can't call me a blind bat any more. Now, go take a shower ... you're out of the game."

Aside from sign language, Taylor would let it be known that he disagreed with an umpire's call by holding his nose and spinning the second finger of his other hand near his temple, demonstrating his belief that the ump was screwy. In June 1905, umpire Hank O'Day ejected Taylor for hand gestures that he interpreted to be an accusation that "I had wheels in my head." A press account described the scene:

He strode angrily toward O'Day, and the grandstand observed a lightning movement of the hands. Mystic symbol followed mystic symbol, and the crowd kept guessing, what it meant. Suddenly O'Day, too, strode forward and majestically waved Mr. Taylor from the field. Still frantically making rotary movements around his temples, "Dummy" dawdled away."

John McGraw recalled an occasion when he, too, was cursed out by Taylor: "In sign language, Dummy consigned me to the hottest place he could think of—and he didn't mean St. Louis." Taylor was also an accomplished juggler and would often put on "a grand juggling act" in front of the Giants' dugout to amuse the fans.

== Later years ==
After his retirement from baseball, Taylor returned to Olathe and the Kansas State School For the Deaf, where he worked as a teacher and coach. He also served as an umpire from 1915 to 1920, working games for the House of David and Union Giants. As of January 1914, he was the physical director at the Kansas School for the Deaf. At the time of the 1915 Kansas State Census, he was living in Olathe with his wife, Della M. (Ramsey) Taylor. At the time of the 1920 United States census, Taylor was living at the Kansas School for the Deaf where he was employed as the physical instructor.

Taylor subsequently moved to Iowa where he worked as a coach at the Iowa School for the Deaf. At the time of the 1925 Iowa State Census, he was living at the Iowa School for the Deaf in Lewis Township, Pottawattamie County, Iowa.

In 1927, several newspapers reported Taylor had died. Taylor issued a statement from his home in Iowa, emphatically denying he was dead. Taylor's statement resulted in headlines in papers across North America such as, "'Dummy' Taylor Denies being Dead." It turned out Taylor had been confused with another deaf baseball pitcher, Lyman "Dummy" Taylor.

At the time of the 1930 United States census, Taylor was still living at the Iowa School for the Deaf. His occupation was listed as a coach, and he was listed as living with his wife, Della M. Taylor, a teacher at the school.

Taylor later was employed at the Illinois School for the Deaf in Jacksonville, Illinois. When he was interviewed in 1942 for a feature story in The Sporting News, Taylor was employed as a coach and "house father" at the Illinois School for the Deaf. One of Taylor's pupils, Dick Sipek, went on to play baseball for the Cincinnati Reds.

Having outlived his first wife, Della, who died in 1931, and second wife Lenora Borjquest, Taylor married for the third time to Lina Belle Davis from Little Rock, Arkansas in August 1941.

Taylor also continued to be involved with professional baseball into the 1950s, umpiring local baseball games and doing scouting work for the Giants.

In August 1958, Taylor died at Our Savior's Hospital in Jacksonville, Illinois. He was buried with his first wife, Della, at Prairie City Cemetery in Baldwin City, Kansas.

He was the last surviving member of the 1905 World Champion New York Giants.

== Cultural references ==
Taylor is used as the narrator and hero of Darryl Brock's fictional account of his later life, Havana Heat.
