= Sang H. Yi =

American official

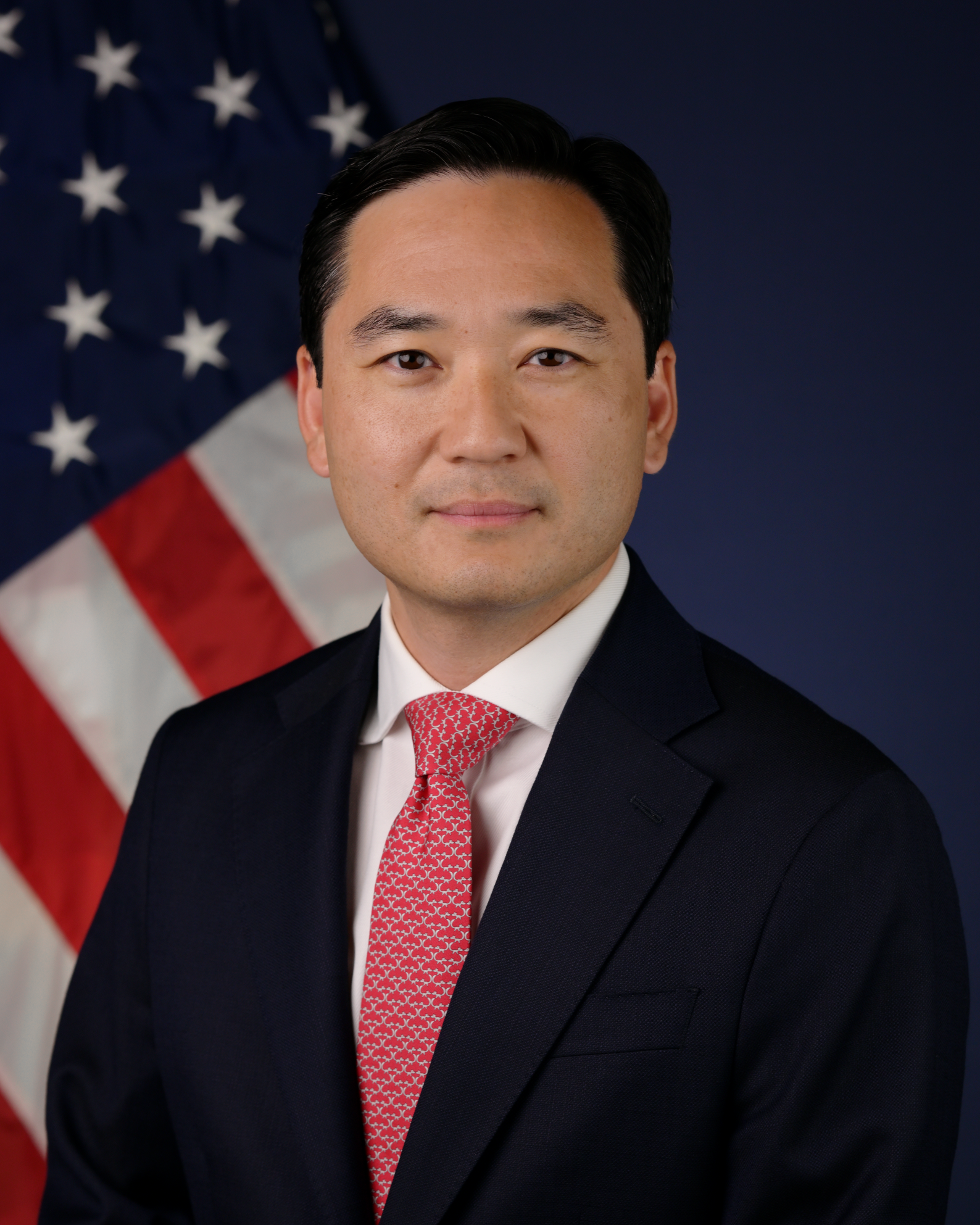
- Official portrait, 2025

Acting United States Maritime Administration Administrator
- In office June 12, 2025 – December 19, 2025
- Preceded by: Ann C. Phillips
- Succeeded by: Stephen Carmel

Personal details
- Spouse: Sarah Yi
- Children: 2
- Education: U.S. Merchant Marine Academy; Naval War College; George Washington University Law School

Military service
- Allegiance: United States
- Branch/service: United States Navy (Reserve)
- Years of service: 2003–2025
- Rank: Lieutenant Commander

Sang Hyun Yi is an American civil servant who had served the deputy administrator of the Maritime Administration (MARAD) at the U.S. Department of Transportation from June 2025 to June 2026. He has stated that it is his goal to support the Trump administration's domestic shipbuilding goals and restore the nation's maritime dominance.

== Education ==
Yi has a Bachelor's in Science in logistics and intermodal transportation from the U.S. Merchant Marine Academy (2003), a Master's of Arts in national security and strategic studies from the U.S. Naval War College (2008), and a Doctor of Law (JD) from the George Washington University Law School (2012). At the Merchant Marine Academy, he earned his Third Mate Unlimited license from the U.S. Coast Guard and was commissioned into the U.S. Naval Reserve.

== Career ==
Yi began his career as an intern at the House Oversight and Government Reform Committee in 2010. He then served as Professional Staff Member and Senior Policy Advisor on the House Oversight and Government Reform Committee in 2011. He joined the House Committee on Natural Resources in 2015, where he served as Senior Counsel, Subcommittee Staff Director, and Chief Investigative Counsel. Yi was elected a member of the City Council for Fairfax, Virginia for two terms beginning in 2018. In 2023, he became the Director of Investigations and Subcommittee Staff Director of the House Committee on Homeland Security.

He served as an officer in the United States Navy Reserve for more than 22 years beginning in 2003 and is a lieutenant commander.

== Personal life ==
Yi was born in South Korea, and immigrated to the United States as a young child is married to Sarah Yi and has two children.
