= Dick Sipek =

Deaf American baseball player (1923–2005)

- Outfielder
- Born: January 16, 1923; Chicago, Illinois, U.S.
- Died: July 17, 2005 (aged 82); Quincy, Illinois, U.S.
- Batted: Left Threw: Right

MLB debut
- April 28, 1945, for the Cincinnati Reds

Last MLB appearance
- September 29, 1945, for the Cincinnati Reds

MLB statistics
- Batting average: .244
- Home runs: 0
- Runs batted in: 13
- Stats at Baseball Reference

Teams
- Cincinnati Reds (1945)

Richard Francis Sipek (January 16, 1923 – July 17, 2005) was an American Major League Baseball outfielder, and the only deaf person to play in the majors between Herbert Murphy in 1914 and Curtis Pride in 1993. He played in 82 games for the Cincinnati Reds in 1945.

== Early life ==
Sipek was born in Chicago, Illinois on January 16, 1923, to Emily and John Sipek. Around the age of five, he became deaf, with the definitive cause being unknown. Theories involved an accident, an illness, or genetic. He was sent to the Illinois School for the Deaf, where he thrived. His housefather was Dummy Taylor, who had won over 100 games as a major league pitcher. Taylor sent letters to the New York Giants and the Cincinnati Reds to send a scout to evaluate Sipek's ability to play, with the Reds signing him to a contract.

== Baseball career ==
At the age of 20, Sipek started his career in the minors. He played for the Birmingham Barons of the Southern Association and the Erwin Aces of the Appalachian League. He batted .336 in 74 games for the former while batting .424 in 37 games for the latter. The following year, he remained with the Barons, playing in 134 games while batting .319. Sipek was called up to start for the Reds for the beginning of the 1945 season. On April 28, he made his debut with the team, pinch hitting for Joe Just in the bottom of the ninth inning. He was walked by Blix Donnelly to load the bases as the Reds won the game later in the inning on a walk off error over the St. Louis Cardinals. Sipek mostly appeared as a pinch hitter, with occasional starts in left or right field. He made 170 plate appearances with 156 at-bats, having 38 hits and 13 RBIs with nine walks and 15 strikeouts for a .244 batting average. As a fielder, he had a .972 fielding percentage, making 68 putouts, two assists, and two errors. After the season, he was sent back to the minors.

The following year, Sipek played with the Syracuse Chiefs in the Triple-A International League, batting .245 in 98 games. The next year was spent with the Columbia Reds in the Single-A South Atlantic League, where he batted .272 in 127 games. He spent the final four years of his career with the Reidsville Luckies of the Carolina League, highlighted by a .322 season in 137 games in his last year in 1951. His career ended when he broke his collarbone during a dive for a fly ball.

== Post career and death ==
After Sipek's career was over, he lived in Quincy, Illinois, with his wife Betty Ann Schmidt, who also attended the Illinois School for the Deaf, with two of their three children subsequently attending the school. He worked in a bakery and as a custodian at St. Mary School. Sipek died on July 17, 2005, at the age of 82.

== Sources ==
- Career statistics from Baseball Reference · Baseball Reference (Minors) · Retrosheet · Baseball Almanac
