= Merchant Marine Act =

Merchant Marine Act can refer to:

- Merchant Marine Act of 1915, the Seamen's Act
- Merchant Marine Act of 1920, the Jones Act
- Merchant Marine Act of 1936
- Merchant Marine Act of 1970, co-drafted by Andrew E. Gibson
