= Commander (United States) =

Rank used in the military and police of the United States

- Insignia of the rank of commander
- Country: United States
- Service branch: United States Navy; United States Coast Guard; United States Public Health Service Commissioned Corps; NOAA Commissioned Officer Corps; US Maritime Service
- Abbreviation: CDR
- Rank group: Senior officer
- NATO rank code: OF-4
- Pay grade: O-5
- Next higher rank: Captain
- Next lower rank: Lieutenant commander
- Equivalent ranks: Lieutenant colonel

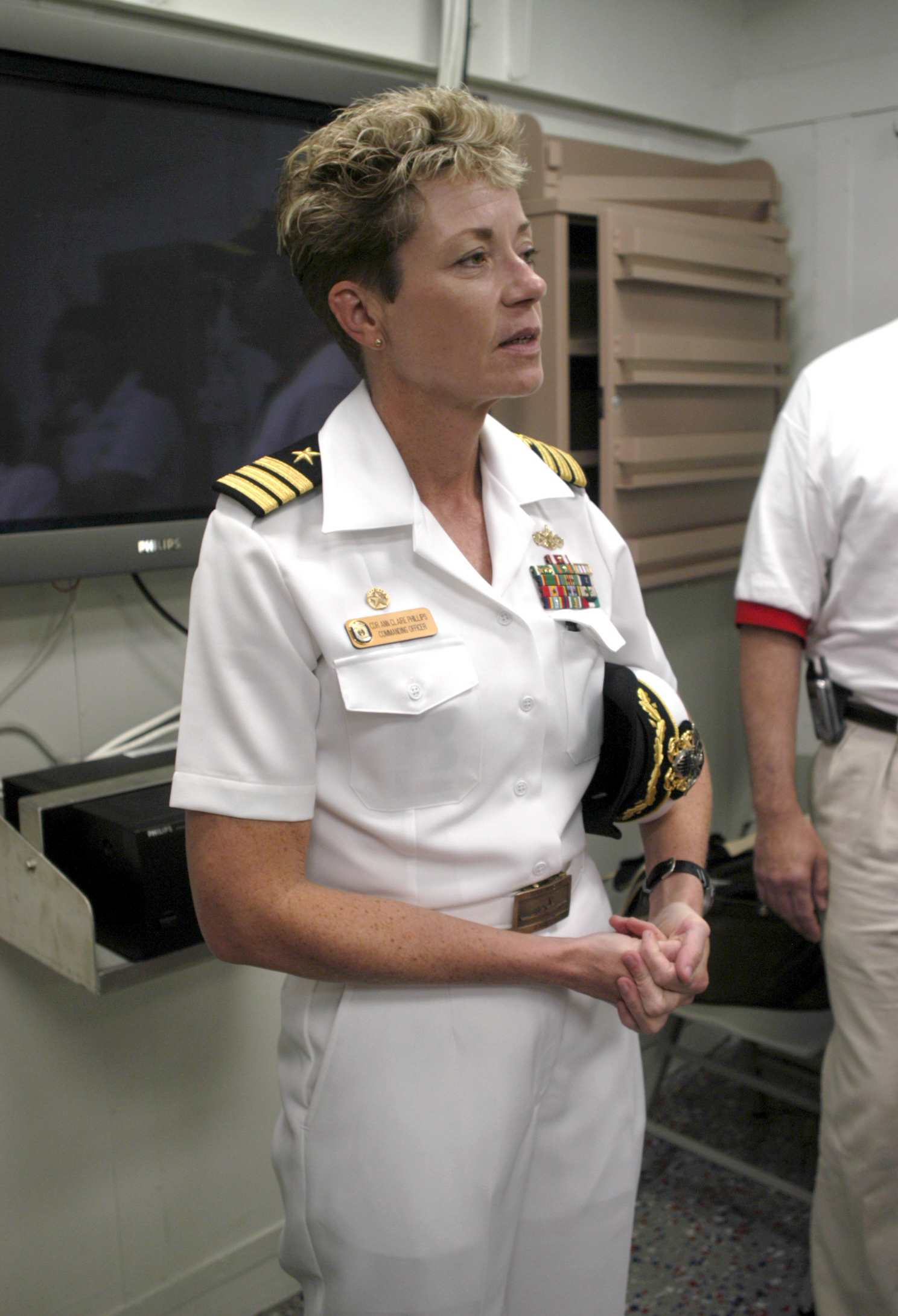
U.S. Navy commander Ann Claire Phillips, first commanding officer of USS Mustin, in 2003

In some U.S. military and government organizations, commander is an officer pay grade (O-5) that is also sometimes used as a military billet title—the designation of someone who manages living quarters or a base—depending on the branch of service. It is also used as a rank or title in non-military organizations, particularly in law enforcement.

== As rank ==
=== History ===
The commander rank started out as "Master and Commander" in 1674 within the Royal Navy for the officer responsible for sailing a ship under the Captain and sometimes second-in-command. Sub-captain, under-captain, rector and master-commanding were also used for the same position. With the Master and Commander also serving as captain of smaller ships the Royal Navy subsumed as the third and lowest of three grades of captain given the various sizes of ships. The Continental Navy had the tri-graded captain ranks. Captain 2nd Grade, or Master Commandant, became Commander in 1838.

=== Naval ===
In the Navy, the Coast Guard, the NOAA Corps, and the Public Health Service Corps, commander (abbreviated "CDR") is a senior-grade officer rank, with the pay grade of O-5. Commander ranks above lieutenant commander (O-4) and below captain (O-6). Commander is equivalent to the rank of lieutenant colonel in the other uniformed services. The United States Maritime Services (USMS) - a voluntary training organization of the U.S. Department of Transportation also uses the rank of Commander.

Notably, it is the first rank at which the holder wears an embellished cap whereas officers of the other military services are entitled to embellishment of similar headgear at O-4 rank. Promotion to commander in the Navy is governed by Department of Defense policies derived from the Defense Officer Personnel Management Act (DOPMA) of 1980 or its companion Reserve Officer Personnel Management Act (ROPMA). DOPMA/ROPMA guidelines suggest that 60-80% of lieutenant commanders should be promoted to commander after serving a minimum of three years at their present rank and after attaining 15–17 years of cumulative commissioned service, although this percentage may vary and be appreciably less for certain officer designators (i.e., primary "specialties") dependent on defense budgets, force structure and needs of the service.

A commander in the Navy may command a frigate, destroyer, submarine, aviation squadron or small shore activity, or may serve on a staff afloat or ashore (typically as an action officer or as an executive officer to a flag officer or general officer), or a larger vessel afloat (as either a department head or executive officer). An officer in the rank of commander who commands a vessel may also be referred to as "captain" as a courtesy title, or informally referred to as "skipper." Commanding officers of aviation squadrons and smaller shore activities may also be informally referred to as "skipper" but never as "captain" unless they actually hold the rank of captain, e.g., military pay grade O-6, as would be the case for certain Fleet Replacement Squadron commanding officers and a wide range of both small and large shore activities.

A commander in the Coast Guard may typically command a medium endurance cutter or a small air station. Like their Navy counterparts, a Coast Guard officer in the rank of commander who commands a cutter may also be referred to as "captain" as a courtesy title, or informally referred to as "skipper." Commanding officers of joint USN/USMC/USCG aviation training squadrons and small Coast Guard air stations and shore activities may also be informally referred to as "skipper" but never as "captain" unless they are commanding a large air station or shore activity and actually hold the rank of captain, e.g., military pay grade O-6.

Although it exists largely as a maritime training organization, the Maritime Service also has the grade of commander. The commission is appointed by the president via the Secretary of Transportation, making it a federally recognized rank with a corresponding pay grade.

In addition to its use as a rank title, the Navy also uses commander as a "position title" for senior captains or flag officers in command of multiple independent units, each with their own "commanding officer". For example, the senior officer in a Navy aviation squadron is the "commanding officer" (CO) because they are in command of that singular unit. That officer's immediate superior in command will likely be an air group or air wing "commander", with the latter being responsible for multiple squadrons. This is in keeping with the naval tradition of "commanding officers" commanding single units, but "commanders" commanding multiple units.

== Insignia ==
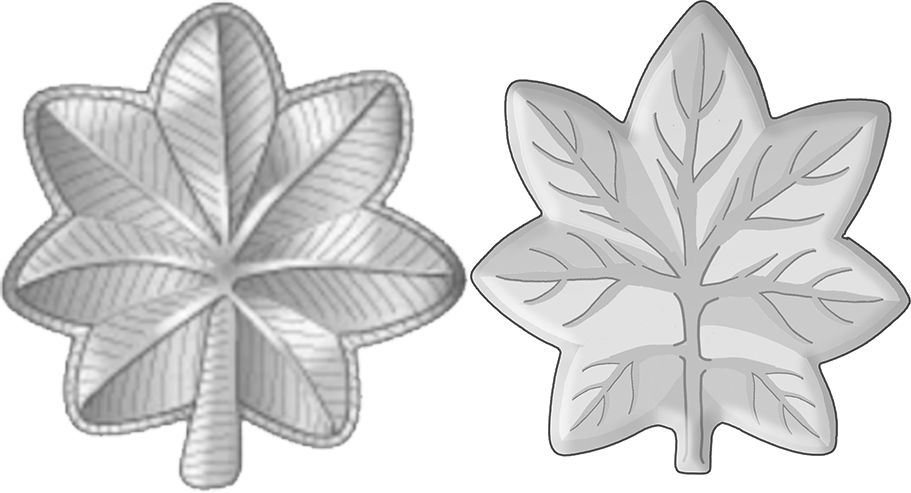
Rank insignia of an Army Lt. Colonel (left) and a Navy Commander (right)

There are two insignia used by commanders. On service khakis and all working uniforms, beginning in 1862 commanders wear a silver oak leaf collar device, similar to the ones worn by lieutenant colonels in the United States Air Force/United States Space Force and United States Army, and identical to that worn by lieutenant colonels in the United States Marine Corps. The Army and US Air & Space Forces oak leaf is a stylized rounded silver leaf that does not represent any individual tree. The naval services version is styled similar to a southern live oak leaf grown in the Naval Live Oaks Reservation in the 19th Century.

In all dress uniforms, they wear sleeve braid or shoulder boards bearing three gold half-inch stripes. In the case of officers of the U.S. Navy, above or inboard of the stripes, they wear their specialty insignia, notably a star for officers of the line, crossed oak leaves for Civil Engineer Corps.

Navy

Coast Guard

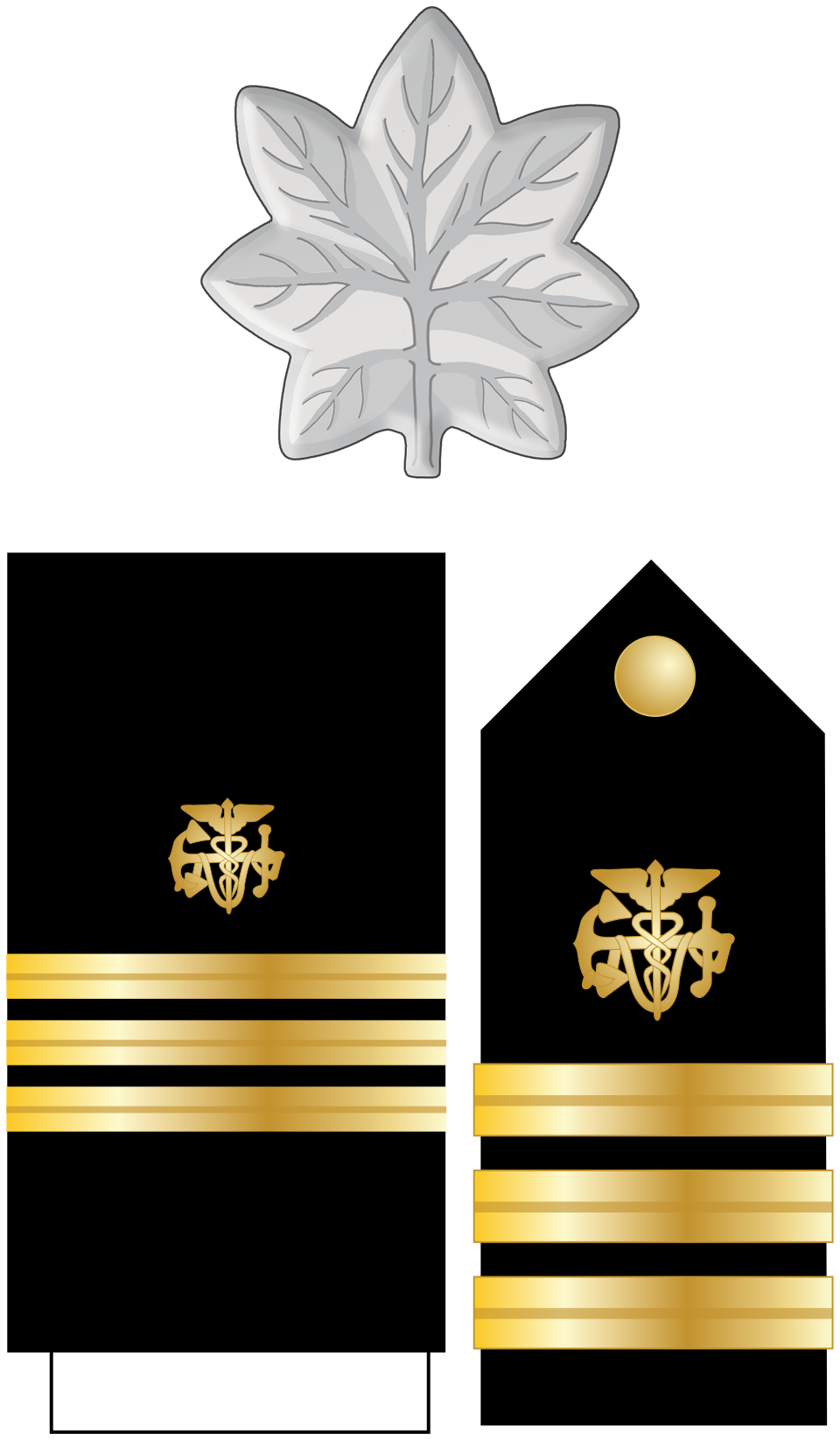
Public Health Service

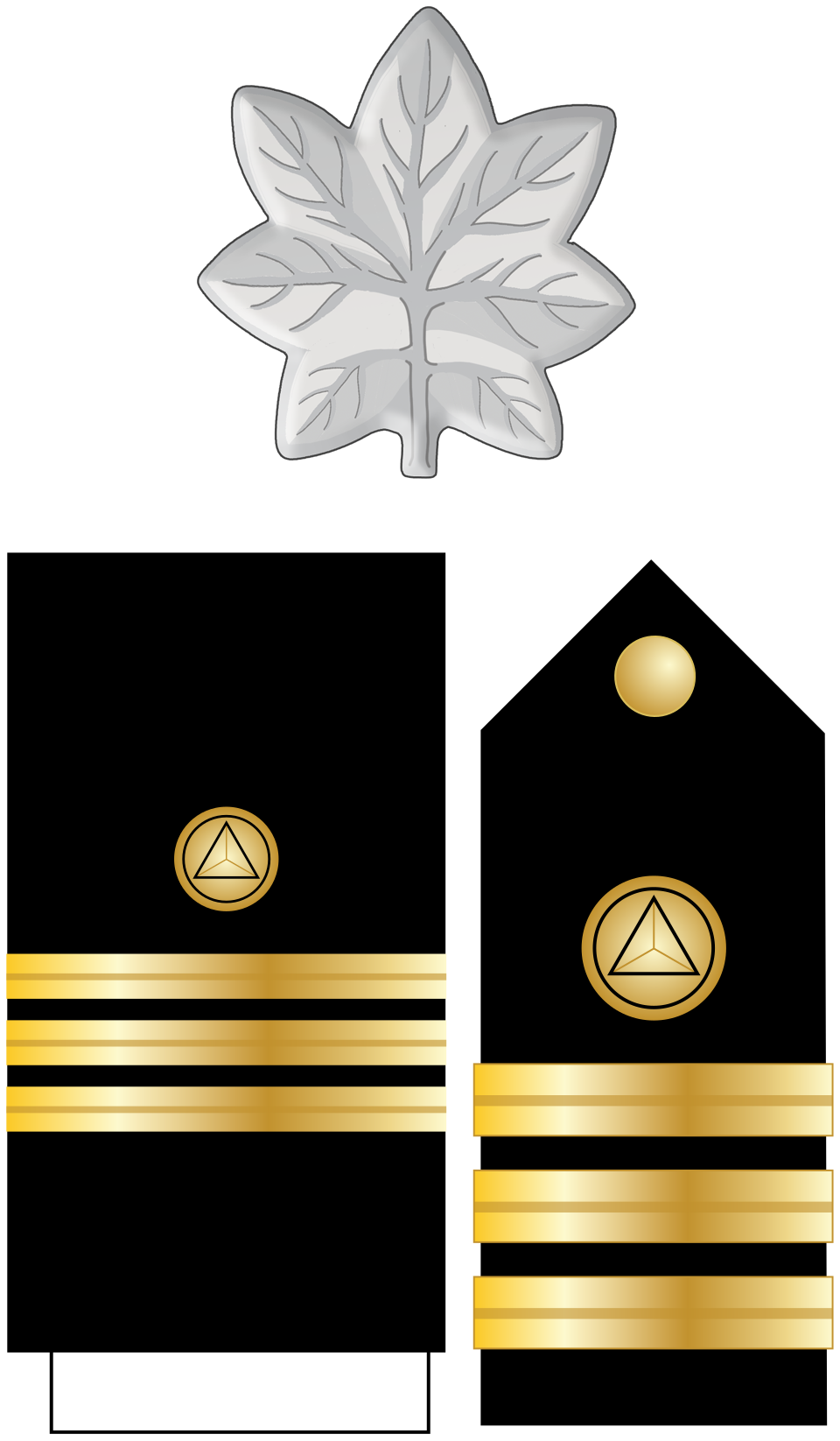
NOAA Corps

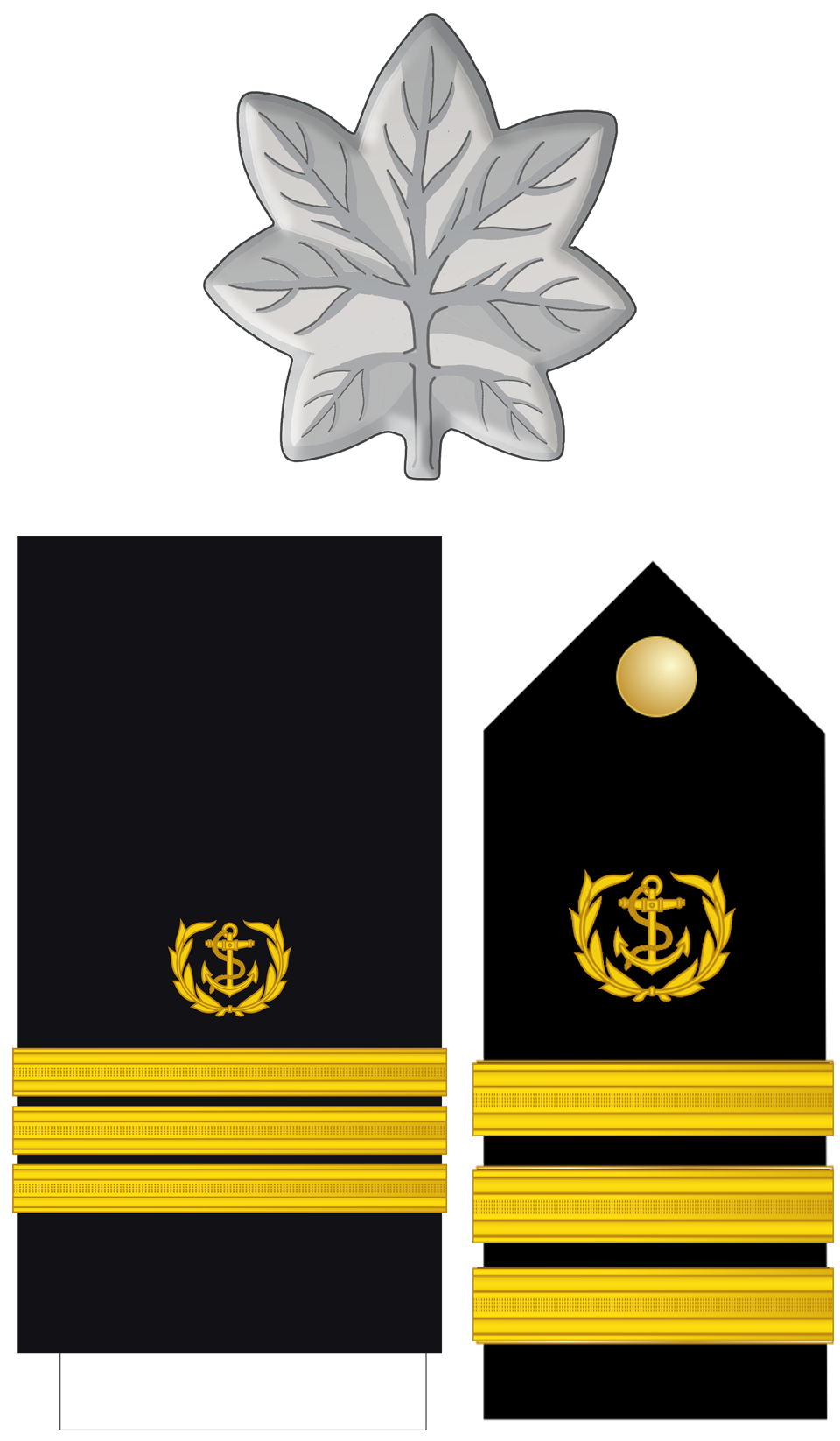
US Maritime Service

=== Police ranks ===
The San Francisco Police Department also has a commander rank. As with the LAPD, it is above captain and below deputy chief. The Metropolitan Police Department of the District of Columbia uses the rank of commander. The rank falls between those of inspector and assistant chief. The Rochester Police Department uses the rank of commander. Higher than captain and below deputy chief, the rank is achieved by appointment. Commander is the rank held by the two patrol division heads and other commanders fill various administrative roles. The Saint Paul Police Department is another police force that uses the rank of commander. In the Saint Paul Police Department, commanders serve as the chief of the district or unit that they oversee.

Many police departments in the Midwest use the rank of commander. It is equivalent to a lieutenant in most other departments, being above a sergeant and below a deputy chief or captain. Commander is also used as a title in certain circumstances, such as the commander of a squad of detectives, who would usually be of the rank of lieutenant. Commander is also utilized by larger sheriff's departments in the United States, with the rank usually falling between chief deputy and captain, three positions removed from the sheriff.

== As appointment ==
=== Army and Marine Corps ===
In the Army and Marine Corps, the term "commander" is officially applied to the commanding officer of a unit; hence, there are company commanders, battalion commanders, brigade commanders, and so forth. At the highest levels of military command structure, "commander" also refers to what used to be called commander-in-chief, or CINC, until October 24, 2002, although the term CINC is still used in casual speech. The soldier in charge of a tank, for example the M1 Abrams, is also called its "commander."

=== Air Force ===
In the Air Force, the term "commander" (abbreviated "CC") is officially applied to the commanding officer of an Air Force unit; hence, there are squadron commanders, group commanders, wing commanders, numbered air force commanders, major command commanders and so forth. In rank, a squadron commander is typically a lieutenant colonel, although some smaller squadrons may be commanded by a major.

A group commander is typically a mid-grade colonel, while a wing commander is typically a senior colonel or a brigadier general. A numbered air force commander is normally a lieutenant general, although some may be in the rank of major general, especially in the Air Force Reserve or Air National Guard. The Major Command commanders are normally in the rank of general or lieutenant general.

== See also ==
- Commander
- Comparative military ranks
- United States Navy officer rank insignia
