= Dummy Lynch =

Dummy Lynch may refer to one of the following people, both of whom played briefly in Major League Baseball:

- Danny Lynch (1926–1978), previously listed by Baseball-Reference.com as "Dummy Lynch", but who was not actually known by the nickname
- Thomas Lynch (1863–1903), known by the nickname per an uncorroborated source

See also

- Dummy (nickname)
