= Northwestern Michigan College =

Public college in Traverse City, Michigan, U.S.

- Type: Public community college
- Established: September 17, 1951; 75 years ago
- Accreditation: Higher Learning Commission
- Endowment: $38.3 million (2024)
- President: Nick Nissley, Ed.D.
- Students: 4,054 (2024-25)
- Location: Traverse City, Michigan, United States; 44°45′57″N 85°35′01″W
- Campus: multiple sites
- Colours: Blue; Green
- Nickname: Hawk Owls
- Mascot: Swoop
- Website: www.nmc.edu

Northwestern Michigan College (NMC) is a public community college in Traverse City, Michigan. Established in 1951, the college enrolls more than 4,000 students. The college offers associate degrees and professional certificates, bachelor's degrees through the Great Lakes Maritime Academy and Great Lakes Water Studies Institute, and bachelor's and master's degrees granted by partner universities.

Entrance sign on East Front Street

NMC has a branch campus on Grand Traverse Bay that houses the Great Lakes Culinary Institute, Great Lakes Maritime Academy, Great Lakes Water Studies Institute and Hagerty Conference Center. Another branch campus near Cherry Capital Airport is home to NMC's aviation and automotive service technology programs, and offers training in manufacturing, construction, renewable energy and information technology. NMC also has an observatory (the Rogers Observatory) and an ACEN (Accreditation Commission for Education in Nursing) accredited nursing program that has a long-standing association with nearby Munson Medical Center. The campus is home to WNMC, which began as a student organization in 1967, and is now a community radio station broadcasting at 90.7 FM. The college also operates the Dennos Museum Center, a Smithsonian affiliated museum of fine art.

== History ==
Northwestern Michigan College was established in 1951 by local academics upset at the lack of higher education in the northern Lower Peninsula. The first classes were held on September 17, 1951, housed at a borrowed, vacant building at Cherry Capital Airport. The first term had a student enrollment of 65, and a staff count of six. In 1956, NMC relocated to a vacant parcel at the base of the Old Mission Peninsula in Traverse City. Some of this parcel was split with Traverse City Area Public Schools, which began construction on Traverse City Senior High School, completing in 1959.

=== Presidents ===
The following are those who have served as President of NMC:

- Preston N. Tanis (1951–1970)
- Jim Davis (1970–1972)
- Committee of Five: Art Moenkhaus, Mike Ouwerkerk, Lornie Kerr, Jack McChrystal, and Willard Smith (1972–1973)
- Bill Yankee (1973–1981)
- George Miller (1981–1986)
- Lornie Kerr (acting president, 1986–1987)
- Philip Runkel (1987–1989)
- Tim Quinn (1989–1996)
- Dr. Ilse Burke (1996–2001)
- Timothy J. Nelson (2001–2019)
- Nick Nissley, Ed.D. (2020–present)

== Campus ==
=== Main campus ===
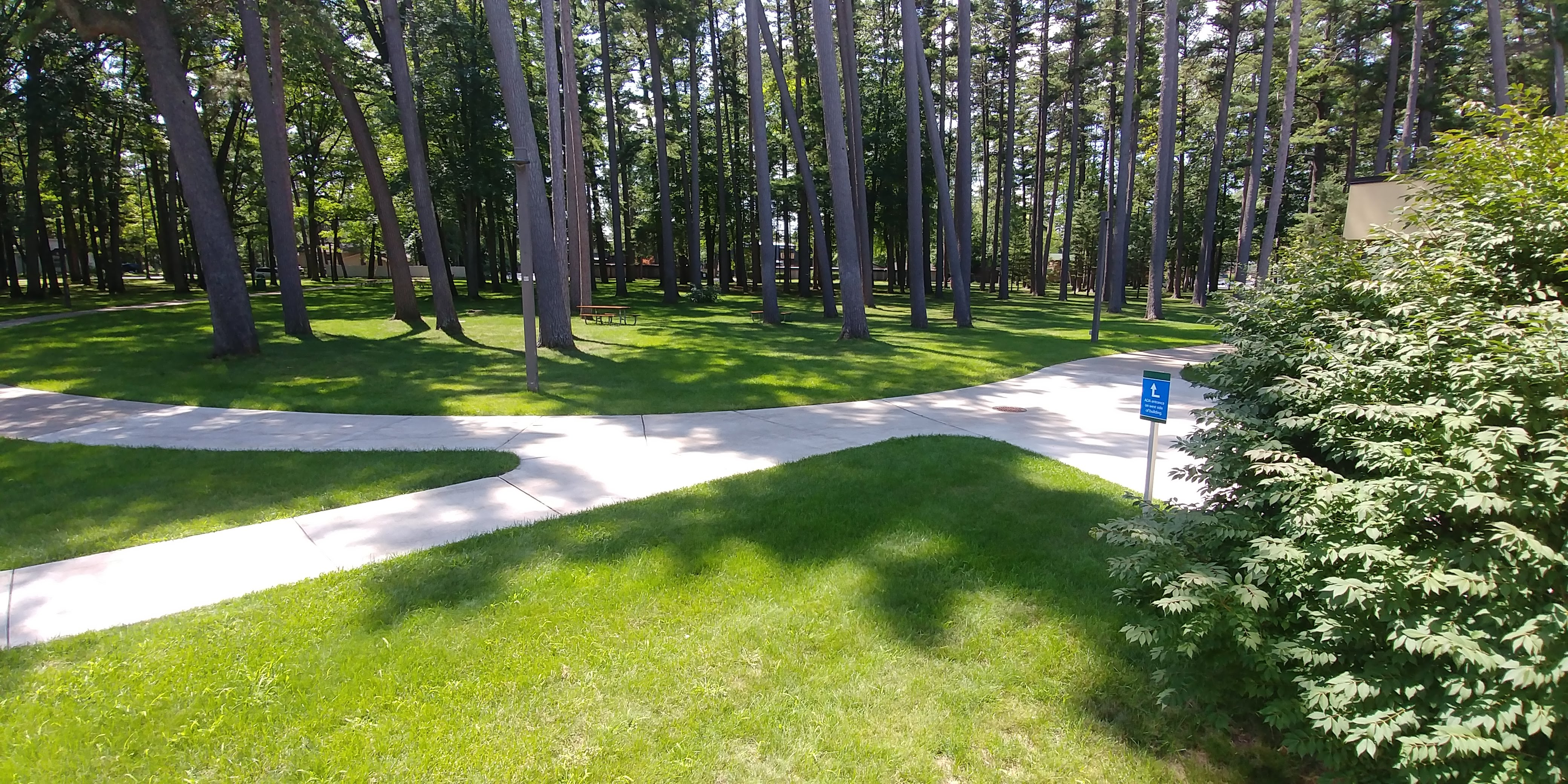
Traverse City main campus

The main campus of Northwestern Michigan College, also known as Front Street Campus, is located within the city of Traverse City, at the base of the Old Mission Peninsula. The campus is largely surrounded by the residential Base of Old Mission and Indian Woods neighborhoods of Traverse City. Immediately adjacent Front Street Campus is the campus of Traverse City Central High School.

Front Street Campus is home to the majority of the college's academic buildings, as well as residence halls and apartments. Located at Front Street Campus is the Dennos Museum Center, a museum of fine art affiliated with Northwestern Michigan College. It consists of an outdoor sculpture garden, several galleries for temporary exhibits, and the museum's signature collection of Inuit art of the Canadian Arctic, one of the largest and most historically complete collections of these distinctive sculptures and prints in the United States.

=== Great Lakes Campus ===
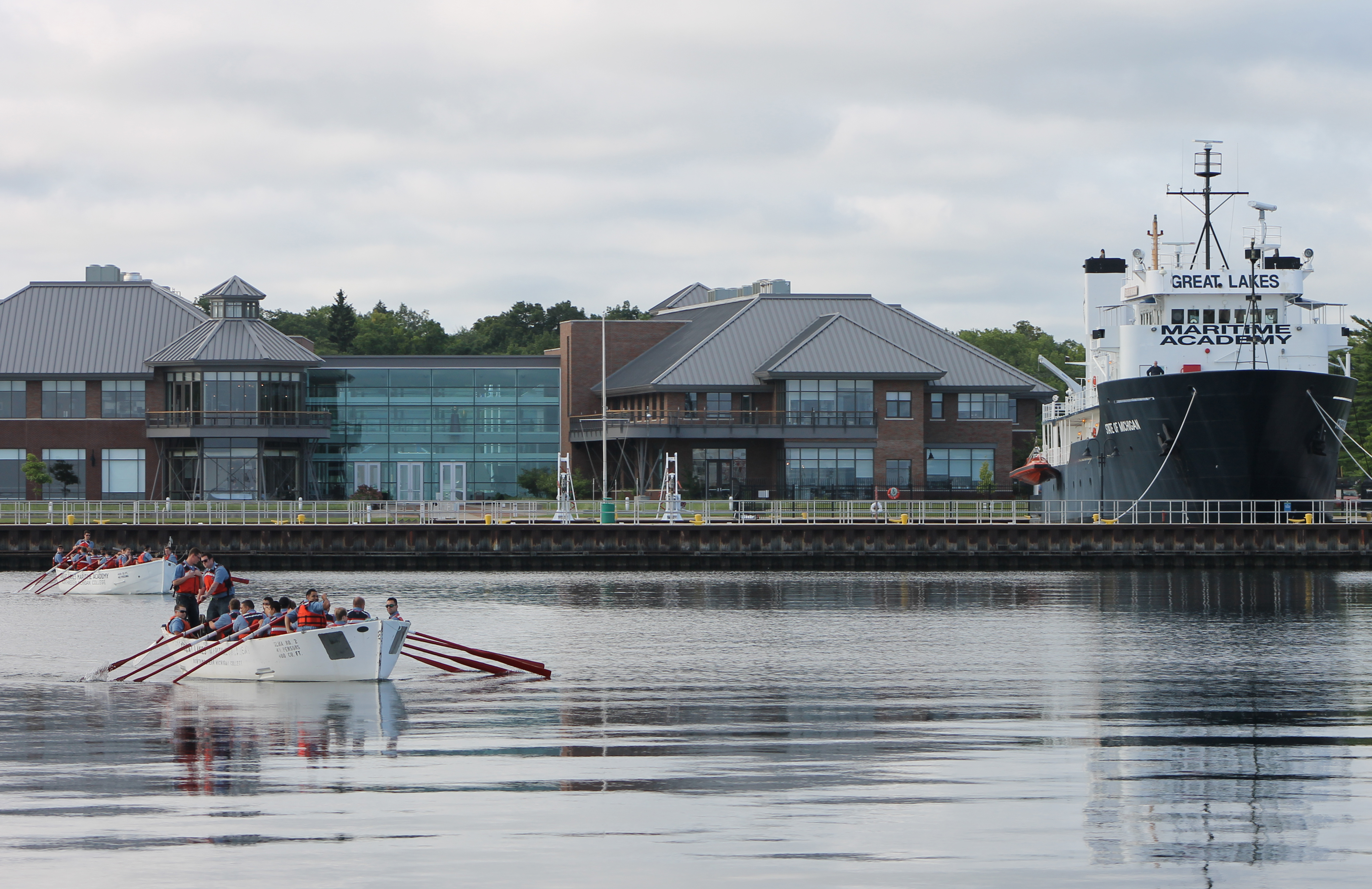
NMC Great Lakes Campus is located on the shore of West Grand Traverse Bay in Traverse City. The T/S State of Michigan is moored at the Great Lakes Maritime Academy pier.

Northwestern Michigan College Great Lakes Campus is located about 1 mile (1.6 km) west of the Front Street Campus. The campus is home to the Great Lakes Maritime Academy (GLMA), one of six state-operated maritime academies that receives aid from the federal Maritime Administration. GLMA is the only U.S. Maritime Academy on fresh water. The academy operates the T/S State of Michigan, a former Navy vessel now used as a training ship.

Also housed at Great Lakes Campus is the Great Lakes Water Studies Institute, Great Lakes Culinary Institute, a teaching restaurant, Lobdell's, and the Hagerty Conference Center.

=== Aero Park Campus ===
Northwestern Michigan College Aero Park Campus is home to the college's flight school, which offers associate and bachelor's degree options. The campus is located adjacent to Cherry Capital Airport, and also includes hangars and an automotive service technology building.

=== Boardman Lake Campus ===
The Boardman Lake Campus, formerly known as the NMC University Center, was located in Garfield Township on the shore of Boardman Lake. The campus hosted NMC's University Partners—Michigan State University, Central Michigan University, Davenport University, Ferris State University and Grand Valley State University, having opened in 1995. The campus was purchased by the Grand Traverse Band of Ottawa and Chippewa Indians in the spring of 2026, with former University Center activities moved to the NMC main campus.

=== Joseph H. Rogers Observatory ===
NMC operates the Joseph H. Rogers Observatory, which is situated atop a hill south of Traverse City in Garfield Township. The observatory opened in 1981.

== Notable alumni ==
- Jason Allen, member of the Michigan House of Representatives and Michigan Senate
- Chasten Buttigieg, LGBT activist and spouse of former United States Secretary of Transportation and former mayor of South Bend, Indiana, Pete Buttigieg
- Betsy Coffia, member of the Michigan House of Representatives
- Jerry Dennis, writer
- Aaron Draplin, graphic designer
- Kevin Elsenheimer, former member of the Michigan House of Representatives
- Andrea Lynn Kritcher, nuclear engineer and physicist
- Michael Masley, instrumentalist
- Bart Stupak, former U.S. Congressman
