= Michigan Author Award =

The Michigan Author Award is awarded annually by the Michigan Library Association to recognize an outstanding published body of fiction, nonfiction, poetry, or play script. A panel of judges representing Michigan librarians and the Michigan Center for the Book determines the recipient on overall literary merit.

== Michigan Author Award recipients ==
- 1992 Dan Gerber
- 1993 Charles Baxter
- 1994 Nancy Willard
- 1995 Janet Kauffman
- 1996 Elmore Leonard
- 1997 Loren Estleman
- 1998 Gloria Whelan
- 1999 Jerry Dennis
- 2000 Janie Lynn Panagopoulos
- 2001 Thomas Lynch
- 2002 Nicholas Delbanco
- 2003 Diane Wakoski
- 2004 Patricia Polacco
- 2005 Christopher Paul Curtis
- 2006 Steve Hamilton
- 2007 Sarah Stewart
- 2008 Tom Stanton
- 2009 Dave Dempsey
- 2010 John Smolens
- 2011 Gary Schmidt
- 2012 Bonnie Jo Campbell
- 2013 Laura Kasischke
- 2014 Jim Harrison
- 2015 David Small
- 2016 Jacqueline Carey
- 2017 Doc Fletcher
- 2018 Beverly Jenkins
- 2019 Jaimy Gordon
- 2020 Mitch Albom
- 2021 Larry Massie
- 2022 Michael Zadoorian
- 2023–2024 Anne-Marie Oomen
