= Great Lakes Maritime Academy =

Public college in Traverse City, Michigan

Coordinates: 44°45′55″N 85°36′25″W

- Type: Public
- Established: 1969
- Parent institution: Northwestern Michigan College
- Location: Traverse City, Michigan, United States
- Website: https://www.nmc.edu/maritime/

The Great Lakes Maritime Academy at Northwestern Michigan College is located on West Grand Traverse Bay in Traverse City, Michigan. The academy was established in 1969 as a Maritime college to train men and women to be licensed mariners on ships of unlimited tonnage or horsepower; including research vessels, cruise ships, freighters, tankers and more. One of six state-operated maritime academies in the United States, the Great Lakes Maritime Academy is the only maritime academy that offers graduates the opportunity to earn First Class Great Lakes Pilotage, and the only maritime academy located on fresh water. Students, called cadets, earn a Bachelor of Science degree and their Federal license to sail as an officer on both the Great Lakes and the oceans.

== Location ==
The academy is located in Traverse City, Michigan, on Grand Traverse Bay in Lake Michigan.

== History ==
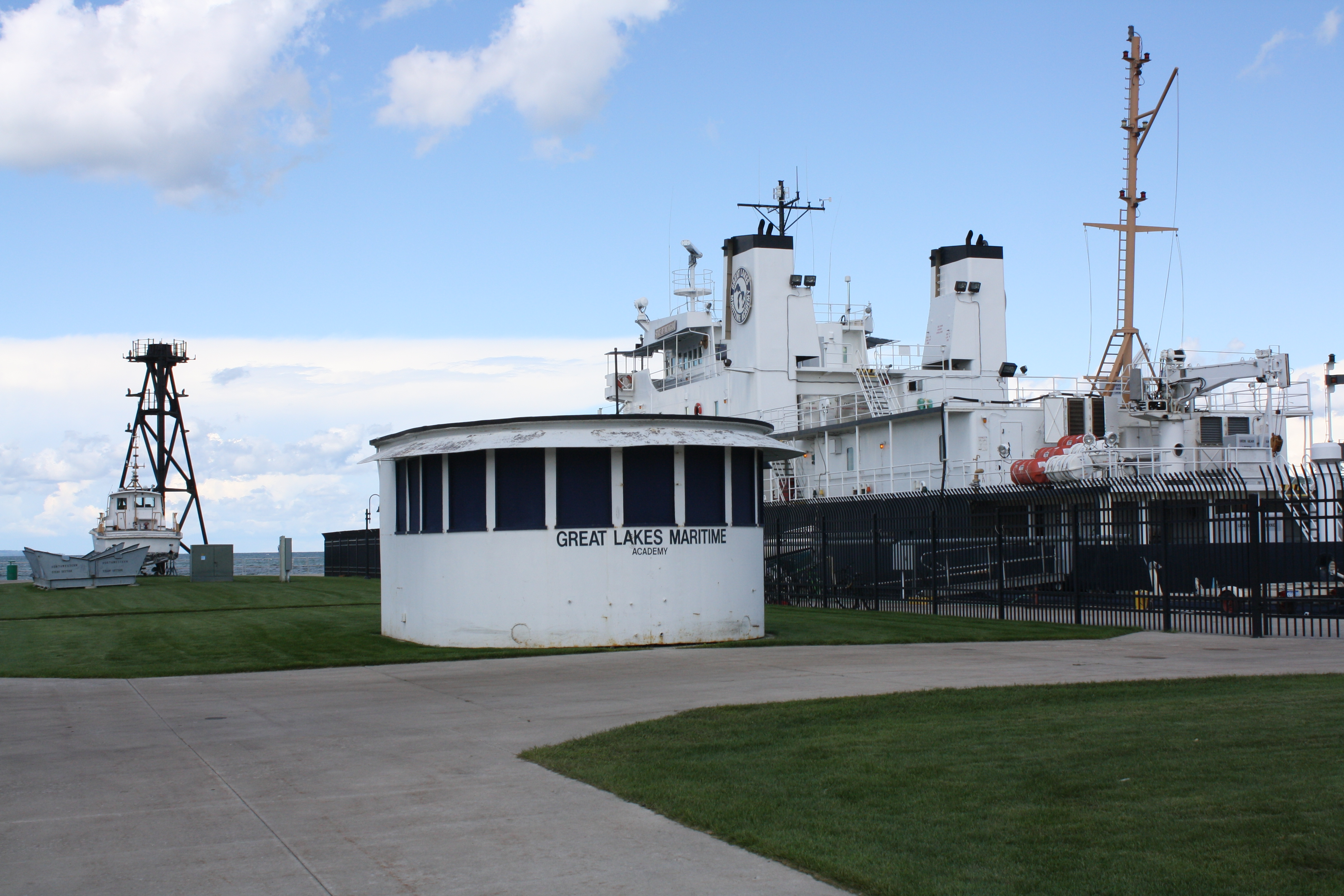
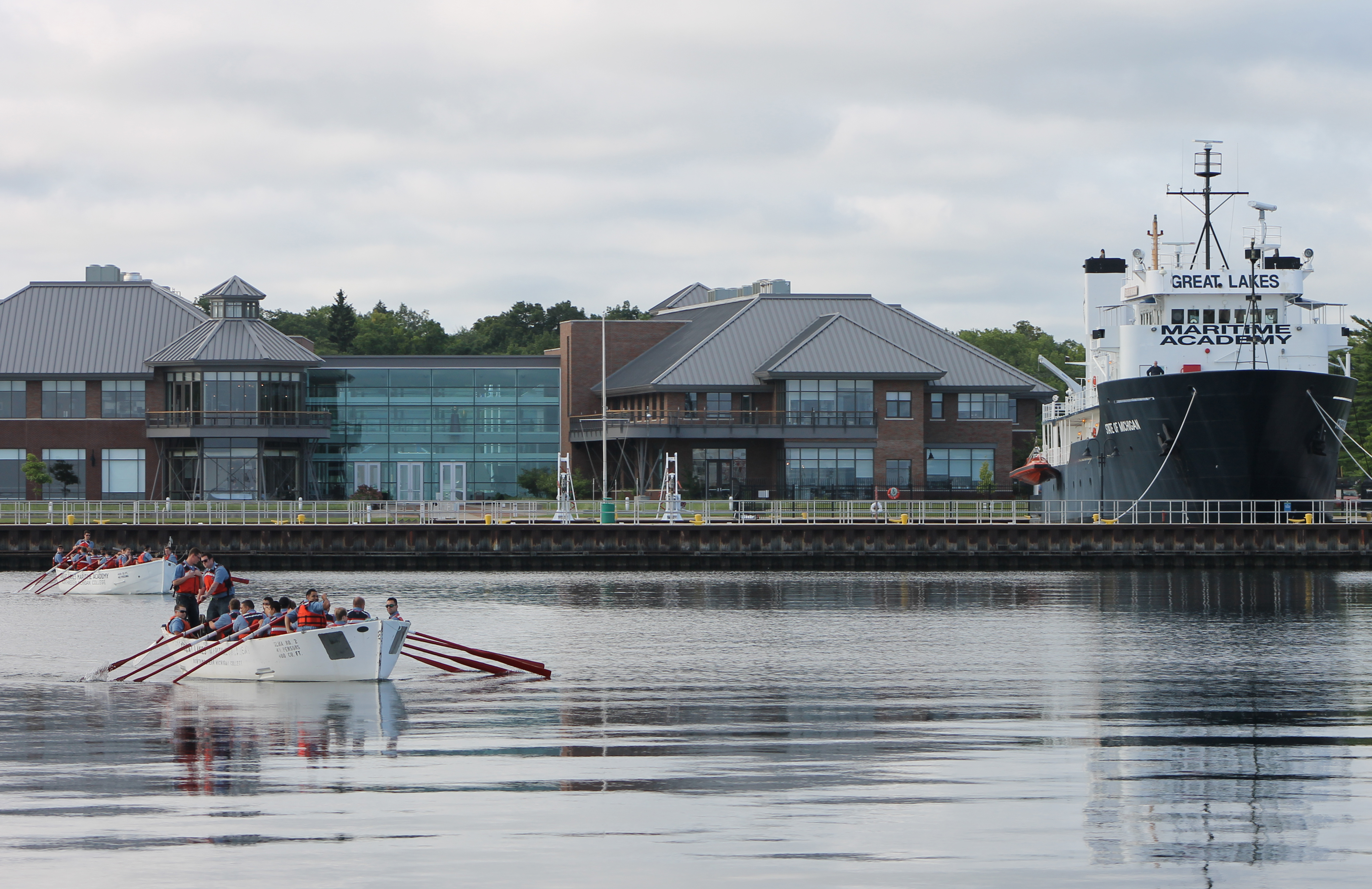
T/S State of Michigan moored at the GLMA pier with cadets learning to row lifeboats and the Academy in the background.

The Great Lakes Maritime Academy was established in 1969 to provide education and training to those wanting a career in the merchant marine. The academy trains mates (pilots), and maritime engineers. The summer of 2002 brought the arrival of the 224-foot (68 m) training ship, a former Navy vessel, now named the T/S State of Michigan. The academy moved into the new facility late fall of 2003.

Originally dedicated on October 23, 1972, the academy harbor was next on the list for improvements and reconstruction began in 2004. The harbor was completely rebuilt and expanded to better accommodate the T/S State of Michigan and the academy’s three smaller vessels. Appropriately named the “Alumni Light”, the Great Lakes Maritime Academy Alumni Association provided funding to place a large green harbor light atop the 40-foot-tall (12 m) former aftermast of the T/S State of Michigan at the northwest corner of the academy’s harbor. The harbor was completed in 2005, and concluded the construction of the modern campus now home to the Great Lakes Maritime Academy where the T/S State of Michigan is moored only 150 feet (46 m) from the buildings rear.

== Academics ==
The Great Lakes Maritime Academy cadets earn their required maritime credentials, "write" for their United States Coast Guard license and earn a bachelor's degree in Maritime Technology. This program prepares graduates for management level positions aboard the largest ships of any type on the Great Lakes and oceans.

Individuals who are admitted to the academy follow a four-year curriculum, with a condensed curriculum offered to those who have already earned enough transferable general education credits. The maritime curriculum includes classroom instruction, labs, simulation and three semesters at sea.

Upon completion of course work and sea projects, deck cadets write the U.S. Coast Guard examinations for licensing as a Third Mate Great Lakes and Oceans Unlimited Tonnage and First Class Great Lakes Pilot. Engineering cadets write the U.S. Coast Guard examination for licensing as a Third Assistant Engineer, Steam and Motor Vessels of any Horsepower. Graduates are fully compliant with STCW '95 (Standards of Training, Certification and Watchkeeping).

In 2013, Northwestern Michigan College won approval to offer a bachelor of science in maritime technology through the academy. The college awarded its first bachelor's degrees to two academy students in January 2014. The Detroit News covered the story, and the broader story of Michigan community colleges offering four-year degrees, in an April 16, 2014, article.

The college is approved by the U.S. Maritime Administration, the U.S. Coast Guard, and the Michigan Department of Education. A new class begins each year in mid-August (fall semester).

== Sea projects ==
Maritime cadets participate in commercial sea projects (semesters at sea) while in attendance at the Great Lakes Maritime Academy. These sea projects are arranged by the academy with shipping companies on either the Great Lakes or oceans. During sea projects, assignments are regularly completed and sent back to academy instructors by cadets.

The T/S State of Michigan is used for the first sea project to educate cadets of the responsibilities of officers and crew, shipboard etiquette and the lifestyle aboard ship. Time spent aboard the T/S State of Michigan does count towards the necessary sea time required for each program. Two additional sea projects are spent aboard commercial ships to best prepare cadets for the real life occupation of a merchant mariner. Cadets must also complete in-port sea days with the T/S State of Michigan. Tasks for in-port sea days include necessary vessel inspection to ensure continued STCW ’95 compliance.

== Training ship ==
Originally launched in 1985 as the USNS Persistent (T-AGOS-6); the T/S State of Michigan was commissioned as a Stalwart-class Tactical Auxiliary General Ocean Surveillance Ship (TAGOS). She was built as an ocean submarine surveillance vessel to tow highly sensitive sonar arrays to track Soviet submarines during the Cold War. In the 1990s, when the Soviet threat was no longer a concern, the Navy opted to decommission the T-AGOS fleet. In 1998, the USNS Persistent and her sister ship, the USNS Vindicator (T-AGOS-3) were transferred to the United States Coast Guard to be used in drug regulation. Even after overhauls to the USNS Persistent, she was determined to be too slow to keep up with the drug policing and became available to other government agencies.

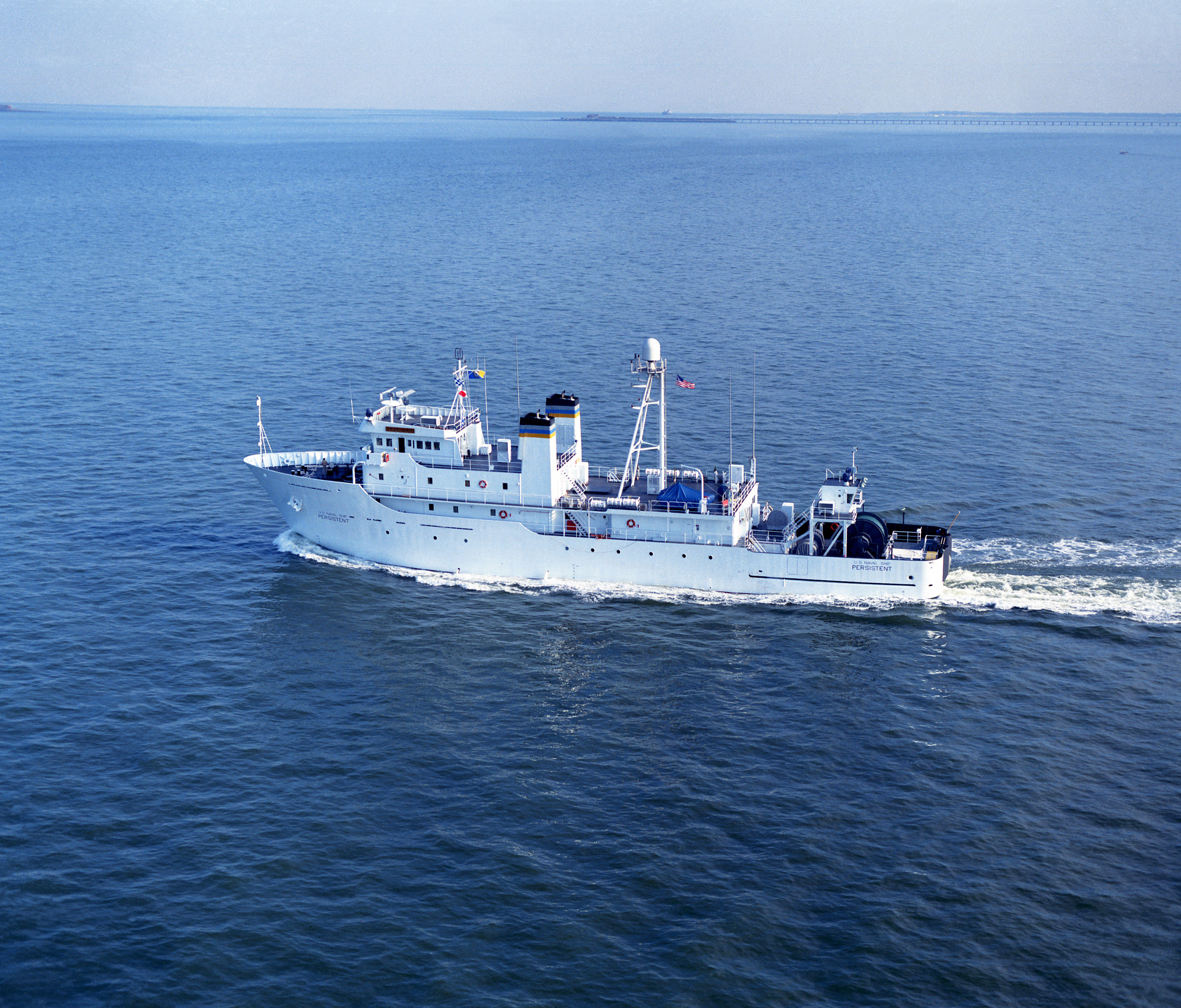
USNS Persistent

The Great Lakes Maritime Academy worked with the U.S. Maritime Administration to negotiate a transfer of the vessel to the academy harbor. In the summer of 2002, the USNS Persistent underwent maintenance and additional overhaul to prepare her for her new freshwater home. In August 2002, the vessel, whose name was changed to the T/S State of Michigan by the Great Lakes Maritime Academy, departed for the Great Lakes by way of the St. Lawrence Seaway. The training ship is now used as a daily laboratory environment and is also used underway allowing cadets to put into practice the theory and skills they have learned prior to their commercial sea projects.

Ship specifications

- Length: 224 feet (68 m)
- Beam: 43 feet (13 m)
- Draft: 15 feet (4.6 m)
- Speed: 11 knots (13 mph; 20 km/h)
- Displacement: 1,565 tons (light) and 2,535 tons (full)
- Underway fuel consumption: 72 gal/hr
- Power plant: Diesel-electric; four Caterpillar D 398 diesel generators, 3,200 hp, 2 motors, 1,600 hp; 2 shafts; bow thruster; 550 hp

== Continuing education ==
The college also organizes professional education and training for officers, including courses such as:

- RADAR re-certification courses
- Global Maritime Distress and Safety System (GMDSS)
- Able Seaman
- Qualified Member of the Engine Department
