= The Final Season (book) =

2001 book by Tom Stanton

The Final Season: Fathers, Sons, and One Last Season in a Classic American Ballpark
- Author: Tom Stanton
- Language: English
- Genre: Memoir
- Publisher: Thomas Dunne Books; St. Martin's Press
- Publication date: 2001
- Publication place: United States

The Final Season: Fathers, Sons, and One Last Season in a Classic American Ballpark is a memoir by Tom Stanton published in 2001 by Thomas Dunne Books / St. Martin's Press.

It tells of Stanton's journey in attending every Detroit Tigers home game in the last year (1999) of Tiger Stadium. The book, Stanton's first major nonfiction work, won the Casey Award, given to the best baseball book of the year. In his Wall Street Journal review, Richard Tofel said, "Mr. Stanton is masterly in chronicling the ballpark community's decline as a replication of the decline of his family's old Detroit neighborhood and in identifying what he and his father have lost. And he is just as good at identifying what endures, principally families—his own family and the family that still gathers around America's national game." The book also won Elysian Field Quarterly's Dave Moore Award.
