= Dummy Deegan =

American baseball player (1874-1957)

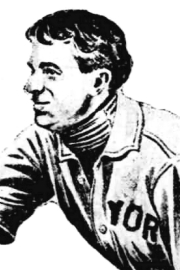
- Pitcher
- Born: November 16, 1874; Bronx, New York, U.S.
- Died: May 17, 1957 (aged 82); Bronx, New York, U.S.
- Batted: Unknown Threw: Right

MLB debut
- August 3, 1901, for the New York Giants

Last MLB appearance
- August 9, 1901, for the New York Giants

MLB statistics
- Innings pitched: 17
- Win–loss record: 0–1
- Earned run average: 6.35
- Stats at Baseball Reference

Teams
- New York Giants (1901)

William Joseph "Dummy" Deegan (November 16, 1874 – May 17, 1957) was an American professional baseball pitcher. In 1901, he played in two games for the New York Giants of Major League Baseball.

Deegan, nicknamed "Dummy" for being a deaf-mute, was one of three pitchers on the Giants staff in 1901 with that nickname; the other two being Dummy Leitner and Dummy Taylor.
