= Havana Heat =

Novel by Darryl Brock

- Original paperback cover of Havana Heat
- Author: Darryl Brock
- Language: English
- Genre: Sports novel
- Publisher: Total Sports Publishing
- Publication date: April 2000
- Publication place: United States
- Media type: Print (Hardback & Paperback); Audio
- Pages: 304pp (original hardcover)
- ISBN: 1-892129-23-X (original hardcover)
- OCLC: 43760201

Havana Heat is a novel published in 2000 by Darryl Brock. It is a fictionalized story about a real historical figure, Dummy Taylor, a deaf baseball player who played professional baseball in the years 1900‒1908.

== Plot summary ==
In 1911, Taylor, a former big-league pitcher, has been sent down to the minor leagues at age 37 due to problems with his pitching arm. He longs for a second chance and approaches his former manager, John McGraw, about re-joining the New York Giants. Short of players, McGraw eventually agrees to take him on a post-season exhibition trip to play baseball in Cuba, where the political atmosphere is tense in the aftermath of the Spanish–American War. During the games in Cuba, Taylor is introduced to a promising Cuban prospect who is also deaf. Taylor encounters moral dilemmas as he balances his desire to return to the big leagues against difficult issues involving racism, discrimination, disability, fading dreams, and the sports philosophy of winning at any cost.

== Characters ==
- Luther "Dummy" Taylor – A 37-year-old deaf-mute pitcher
- Della Taylor – Luther's wife
- Sim Taylor – Luther's brother
- John McGraw – Giants manager
- Turkey Mike Donlin – outfielder and old friend of Luther
- Luis – 19-year-old deaf pitcher
- Nico – Luis' rival
- Elias Serros – Luis' grandfather/rebel
- Father Cipriano – ran the School of the Deaf

== Themes ==
- Nostalgia
- Father-son connection
- Superstitions
- Race
- Handicap

== Relationship to Baseball ==
The book is based on a real deaf pitcher, Dummy Taylor. All of the major league players mentioned in the novel are all based on real ballplayers on the Giants at that time. Dummy played for the New York Giants from 1900 to 1908. There is no information that indicates that he played in Cuba at any time. Dummy did go on to coach at his alma mater, The Kansas School for the Deaf, as well as two other schools, and was a major inspiration to all those around him.

== Reception ==
Havana Heat won the Dave Moore Award in 2000 for the "most important baseball book" published that year. This award is given out by the Elysian Fields Quarterly, a literary baseball journal.
