= Tom Stanton (author) =

American journalist (born 1960)

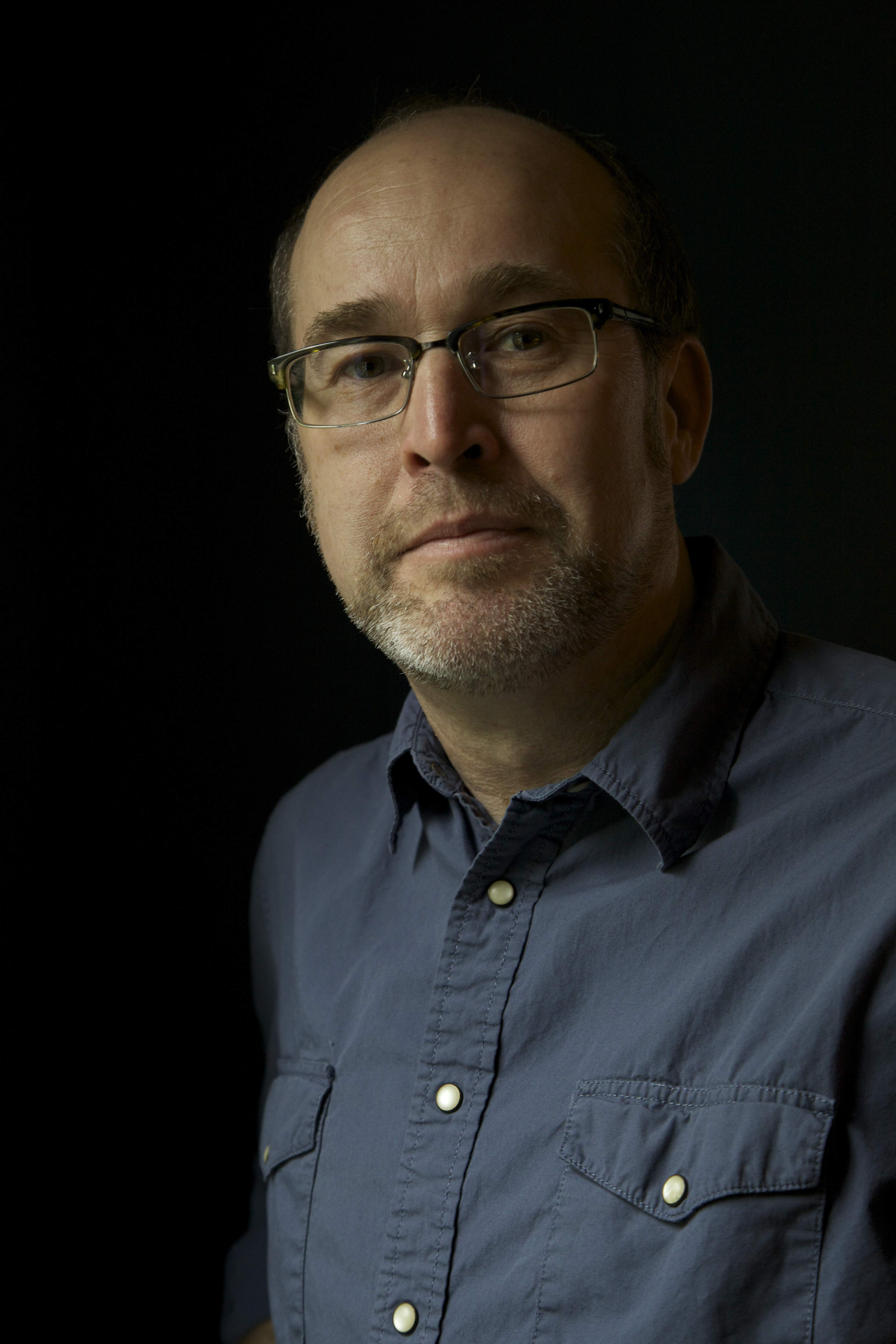
- Born: December 17, 1960 (age 65); Warren, Michigan
- Occupations: Associate Professor, University of Detroit Mercy
- Writing career
- Notable awards: Knight-Wallace Fellow Michigan Author of the Year, 2008
- Website: tomstanton.com

Tom Stanton (born December 17, 1960, in Warren, Michigan) is the author of several nonfiction books, including two memoirs. In 1983, Stanton, a journalist, co-founded The Voice Newspapers in suburban Detroit and served as editor for sixteen years before embarking on a literary career in 1999. A former Knight-Wallace Fellow at the University of Michigan, Stanton teaches journalism at the University of Detroit Mercy. In 2008, Stanton won the Michigan Author Award.

== Books ==
Stanton's first baseball book was The Final Season, a memoir of the last season of Detroit Tigers baseball at historic Tiger Stadium (during which, Stanton attended all Tigers home games), as well as his familial relationships and the way baseball bonded fathers and sons together. The book was well-received, winning Spitball Magazine's CASEY Award and Elysian Fields Quarterly's Dave Moore Award. Stanton's second baseball memoir, The Road to Cooperstown, is about a road trip the author took with his older brother and father to the National Baseball Hall of Fame in Cooperstown, New York.

His third baseball book was Hank Aaron and the Home Run That Changed America, a history of Hank Aaron's 1973-1974 pursuit of Major League Baseball's career home runs record. The book again met critical success, and was named a Reader's Digest "Editor's Selection of the Month."

He also wrote Ty and The Babe, about the relationship between baseball icons Ty Cobb and Babe Ruth, longtime rivals who became friends in retirement. A finalist for Publishers Weekly's Quill Awards (Sports Division) and the Great Lakes Booksellers Association’s Nonfiction Book of the Year. In 2008, Stanton was given the Michigan Author Award, awarded annually by the Michigan Library Association and Center for the Book to "a Michigan writer for his or her contributions to literature based on an outstanding published body of work."

Terror in the City of Champions: Murder, Baseball, and the Secret Society That Shocked Depression-Era Detroit is Stanton's most recent work. The 2016 nonfiction book tells the overlapping stories of the Black Legion terrorist group and the mid-1930s athletics success of Joe Louis and the Detroit Tigers, Lions and Red Wings. It received starred reviews from Kirkus Reviews and Booklist.

== Honors and awards ==
- Michigan Notable Book Award, 2017.
- INDIES Award, Book of the Year: True Crime, Foreword Magazine, 2016.
- Michigan Author Award, 2008.
- Quill Awards finalist for Ty and The Babe, 2007.
- CASEY Award for The Final Season, 2001.
- Dave Moore Award for The Final Season, 2001.
- Knight-Wallace Fellowship, 1995-96.

== Bibliography ==
- Terror in the City of Champions (2016), ISBN 9781493015702
- The Detroit Tigers by Fred Lieb (wrote new foreword, 2008), ISBN 978-0-87338-958-7
- Ty and The Babe (2007), ISBN 0-312-36159-9
- The Detroit Tigers reader (editor, 2006), ISBN 0-472-03017-5
- Hank Aaron and the Home Run That Changed America (2004), ISBN 0-06-072290-8
- The Road to Cooperstown (2003), ISBN 0-312-33118-5
- The Final Season (2001), ISBN 0-312-29156-6
- Rocket Man: The Encyclopedia of Elton John (coauthored with Claude Bernardin, 1995), ISBN 0-313-29700-2
