= Dummy Leitner =

American baseball player (1871–1960)

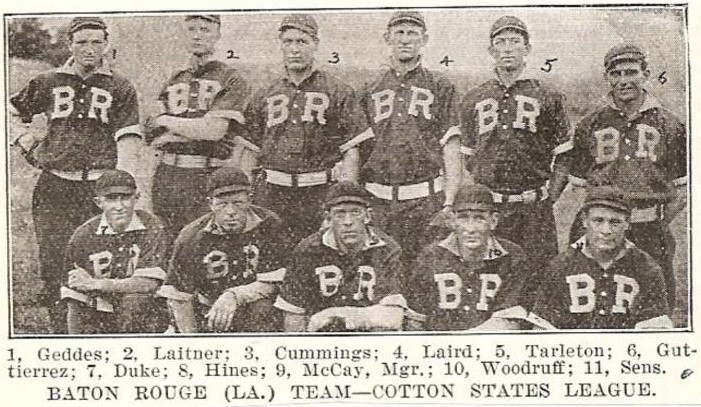
- Leitner (standing second from left) with the 1906 Baton Rouge Cajuns
- Pitcher
- Born: June 19, 1871; Parkton, Maryland, U.S.
- Died: February 20, 1960 (aged 88); Baltimore, Maryland, U.S.
- Batted: Left Threw: Right

MLB debut
- June 29, 1901, for the Philadelphia Athletics

Last MLB appearance
- August 25, 1902, for the Chicago White Sox

MLB statistics
- Win–loss record: 0–2
- Earned run average: 5.34
- Strikeouts: 4
- Stats at Baseball Reference

Teams
- Philadelphia Athletics (1901); New York Giants (1901); Cleveland Bronchos (1902); Chicago White Sox (1902)

George Michael "Dummy" Leitner (June 19, 1871 – February 20, 1960) was an American professional baseball pitcher. He played in Major League Baseball (MLB) for two seasons for the Philadelphia Athletics (1901), New York Giants (1901), Cleveland Bronchos (1902), and Chicago White Sox (1902).

Leitner was deaf, and like other deaf baseball players of his era, was nicknamed "Dummy". Three members of the 1901 Giants pitching staff shared that nickname: Leitner, Deegan, and Taylor.

Leitner had a deaf sister, Lydia (died at 21), and a deaf brother, Frank, who was active in Pittsburgh. He married a deaf woman named Helen (née Wells) and had two children, a deaf daughter named Helen who was later married to deaf August Wriede, and a hearing son named Clarence Wells Leitner who was known for his intelligence in writing and editing for the Evening Sun and North East newspaper for the city of Baltimore. George and Clarence Leitner and August Wriede all worked for The Baltimore Sun. Leitner died in Baltimore at the age of 88.
