= United States Maritime Administration =

Agency within the U.S. Department of Transportation

- Seal of the U.S. Maritime Administration

- Flag of the U.S. Maritime Administration

Agency overview
- Formed: May 24, 1950
- Preceding agency: Maritime Commission
- Headquarters: Washington, D.C.
- Agency executives: Stephen Carmel, Administrator; Mark D. Johnson, Deputy Administrator
- Parent agency: Department of Transportation
- Website: maritime.dot.gov

The United States Maritime Administration (MARAD) is an agency of the United States Department of Transportation. MARAD administers financial programs to develop, promote, and operate the U.S. Maritime Service and the U.S. Merchant Marine. In addition, it conducts research and development activities in the maritime field; regulates the transfer of U.S. documented vessels to foreign registries; maintains equipment, shipyard facilities, and reserve fleets of Government-owned ships essential for national defense. MARAD also maintains the National Defense Reserve Fleet (NDRF) as a ready source of ships for use during national emergencies and logistically supporting the military when needed. MARAD also manages the Ready Reserve Force (RFF) and operates the U.S. Merchant Marine Academy at Kings Point.

== History ==
When the United States Maritime Commission was abolished on May 24, 1950, its functions were split between the Federal Maritime Board which was responsible for regulating shipping and awarding subsidies for construction and operation of merchant vessels, and Maritime Administration, which was responsible for administering subsidy programs, maintaining the national defense reserve merchant fleet, and operating the United States Merchant Marine Academy.

In 1961, the Federal Maritime Board regulatory functions were assumed by the newly created Federal Maritime Commission, while the subsidy functions were assigned to the Maritime Subsidy Board of the Maritime Administration. In 1964, the US was only moving about 15% of the world's cargo and goods by sea. The Maritime Administration instituted three programs to increase U.S. ship building and make the new U.S. built hulls more efficient and carry larger payloads.

On August 6, 1981, MARAD came under control of the Department of Transportation thereby bringing all transportation programs under one cabinet-level department.

In 2026, Transportation Secretary Sean Duffy announced a new initiative to develop Small Modular Reactors (SMRs) for commercial vessels, hoping to make nuclear-powered ships part of the U.S. shipping ecosystem.

== Maritime Academies ==
The Maritime Administration collaborates with stakeholders from all transportation sectors and modes in order to accomplish its mission to improve the U.S. marine transportation system. MARAD operates one federal service academy and administers a Grant-In-Aid Program for six state-operated maritime academies:

Classification	Name	Location	Notes
Federal	United States Merchant Marine Academy	Kings Point, New York	One of the United States service academies
State	California Polytechnic State University Maritime Academy	Vallejo, California	A campus of the California Polytechnic State University
State	Maine Maritime Academy	Castine, Maine	A public post-secondary college and nautical training institution
State	Massachusetts Maritime Academy	Buzzards Bay, Massachusetts	A regionally accredited, coeducational, state college
State	Great Lakes Maritime Academy	Traverse City, Michigan	A division of Northwestern Michigan College
State	SUNY Maritime College	Bronx, New York	A campus of the State University of New York
State	Texas A&M Maritime Academy	Galveston, Texas	A branch campus of Texas A&M University

Students at these academies can graduate with appropriate United States Coast Guard licenses (Mate or Engineer) if they choose to take the Coast Guard License exam. They may become commissioned reserve officers in any branch of the service when graduating from USMMA or a ROTC scholarship from one of the other maritime schools.

== Subsidies ==
The Maritime Subsidy Board negotiates contracts for ship construction and grants operating-differential subsidies to shipping companies.

== Maritime Security Program ==
The Maritime Administrator is vested with the residual powers of the Director of the National Shipping Authority, which was established in 1951 to organize and direct emergency merchant marine operations.

The Maritime Security Act of 1996 created the Maritime Security Program (MSP) authorizes MARAD to enter into contracts with U.S.-flag commercial ship owners to provide service during times of war or national emergencies. As of 2007, ten companies have signed contracts providing the MSP with a reserve of sixty cargo vessels. The MSP is the largest source for Department of Defense surge fleet.

== Past Administrators ==
No.	Portrait	Administrator	Term started	Term ended	Ref.
1		Vice Admiral Edward L. Cochrane	August 8, 1950	October 1, 1952	
2		Albert W. Gatov	October 2, 1952	June 30, 1953	
3		Louis S. Rothschild	July 1, 1953	February 25, 1955	
4		Clarence G. Morse	March 16, 1955	May 1, 1960	
5		Vice Admiral Ralph E. Wilson	July 1, 1960	February 22, 1961	
6		Donald W. Alexander	October 9, 1961	October 31, 1963	
7		Nicholas Johnson	March 2, 1964	June 30, 1966	
8		Andrew E. Gibson	March 25, 1969	July 6, 1972	
9		Robert J. Blackwell	July 7, 1972	April 9, 1979	
10		Admiral Harold E. Shear	October 19, 1981	May 31, 1985	
11		John A. Gaughan	November 26, 1985	March 26, 1989	
12		Captain Warren G. Leback	October 11, 1989	January 20, 1993	
13		Vice Admiral Albert J. Herberger	September 14, 1993	June 30, 1997	
14		Clyde J. Hart Jr.	August 6, 1998	May 21, 2000	
15		Captain William G. Schubert	December 6, 2001	February 11, 2005	
16		Sean T. Connaughton	September 6, 2006	January 20, 2009	
17		David T. Matsuda	July 30, 2009	June 4, 2013	
18		Paul N. "Chip" Jaenichen	July 25, 2014	January 13, 2017	
19		Rear Admiral Mark H. Buzby	August 8, 2017	January 11, 2021	
20		Rear Admiral Ann C. Phillips	May 16, 2022	January 20, 2025	
-		Sang Yi (acting)	June 12, 2025	December 19, 2025	
21		Stephen M. Carmel	December 19, 2025	Incumbent	

== See also ==
- Merchant navy
- Port authority
- United States Shipping Board
- United States Maritime Commission
