= Rogers Observatory =

Observatory in Michigan, US

- Organization: Northwestern Michigan College
- Location: Traverse City, Michigan
- Coordinates: 44°42′24″N 85°46′32″W
- Altitude: 257 m (843 ft)
- Website: www.nmc.edu/rogersobservatory/

Telescopes
- Schmidt-Cassegrain Telescope: 14" Reflector

Joseph H. Rogers Observatory is an astronomical observatory owned and operated by Northwestern Michigan College. It is located in Traverse City, Michigan (USA). Construction on the observatory was completed in 1981.

== See also ==
- List of observatories
