= Andrew E. Gibson =

American historian

Andrew Gibson

United States Maritime Administrator
- In office March 25, 1969 – July 6, 1972
- President: Richard Nixon
- Preceded by: Nicholas Johnson
- Succeeded by: Robert J. Blackwell

Personal details
- Born: February 19, 1922 New York City, New York
- Died: July 8, 2001 (aged 79) Short Hills, New Jersey, U.S.
- Party: Republican
- Education: Massachusetts Maritime Academy (BS); Brown University (BA); New York University (MBA); Cardiff University (PhD)

Andrew E. Gibson, (19 February 1922 in New York City- 8 July 2001 in Short Hills, New Jersey) was an American shipping executive, maritime administrator and U.S. Assistant Secretary of Commerce for Maritime Affairs, 1969–1973, and historian of American maritime policy.

== Education and early career ==
Andrew E. Gibson graduated from the Massachusetts Maritime Academy, then located in Boston, in 1943 and joined the United States Lines where he was master of the Liberty Ship SS Leonidas Merritt in the Pacific from 1944 to 1946.

When the war ended, Gibson took a job with the Firestone Tire and Rubber Company in Fall River, Massachusetts. He enrolled in Brown University in 1948, where he majored in economics and graduated in 1951.

== Later maritime career ==
During the Korean War, he was controller of the budget for the Military Sea Transport Service in Brooklyn, New York. In 1953, he joined the Grace Line where he rose from assistant treasurer to senior vice president in charge of operations. In 1967, he moved to the Diebold Group, a management consulting firm in New York City. He was nominated as Maritime Administrator by President Richard M. Nixon in 1969 and served in that capacity, as well as assistant secretary for Maritime Affairs in the Department of Commerce until 1972. He was instrumental in drafting legislation for the Merchant Marine Act of 1970 and successfully negotiated the U.S.-U.S.S.R. Maritime Agreement of 1972. He also served as assistant secretary for domestic and international business. Later, he was appointed to the Panama Canal Commission and as ambassador to the International Labour Organization.

After leaving government service, Gibson was president of Interstate Oil Transportation Company, 1973–1974, president of Maher Terminals, Inc., 1975–1977, president of Delta Steamship Lines, 1979–1982, and chairman of American Automar, 1983–1988.

== Academic career ==
He was an adjunct faculty member at the University of South Carolina from 1981 to 1988. Gibson earned a master's degree in business administration from New York University in 1959 and attended the six-week Advanced Management Program at Harvard University in 1975. He received a PhD from the University of Wales, Cardiff in 1994. He held the Emory Land Chair of Maritime Affairs at the Naval War College from 1988 to 1992 in the Department of National Security and Decision Making and was a visiting fellow at the college from 1992 through 2001.

His publications include articles in The U.S. Naval Institute Proceedings, American Shipper, The Naval War College Review, and a book, written with Arthur Donovan developed from his dissertation entitled Abandoned Ocean: A History of U.S. Maritime Policy published by the University of South Carolina Press in 2000. He received the Robert M. Thomson Award from the Navy League and the Land Medal from the American Society of Naval Architects, both in 1972.

Gibson died on July 8, 2001, at his home in Short Hills, New Jersey.
