= Stephen Carmel =

American maritime executive and government official

Stephen M. Carmel
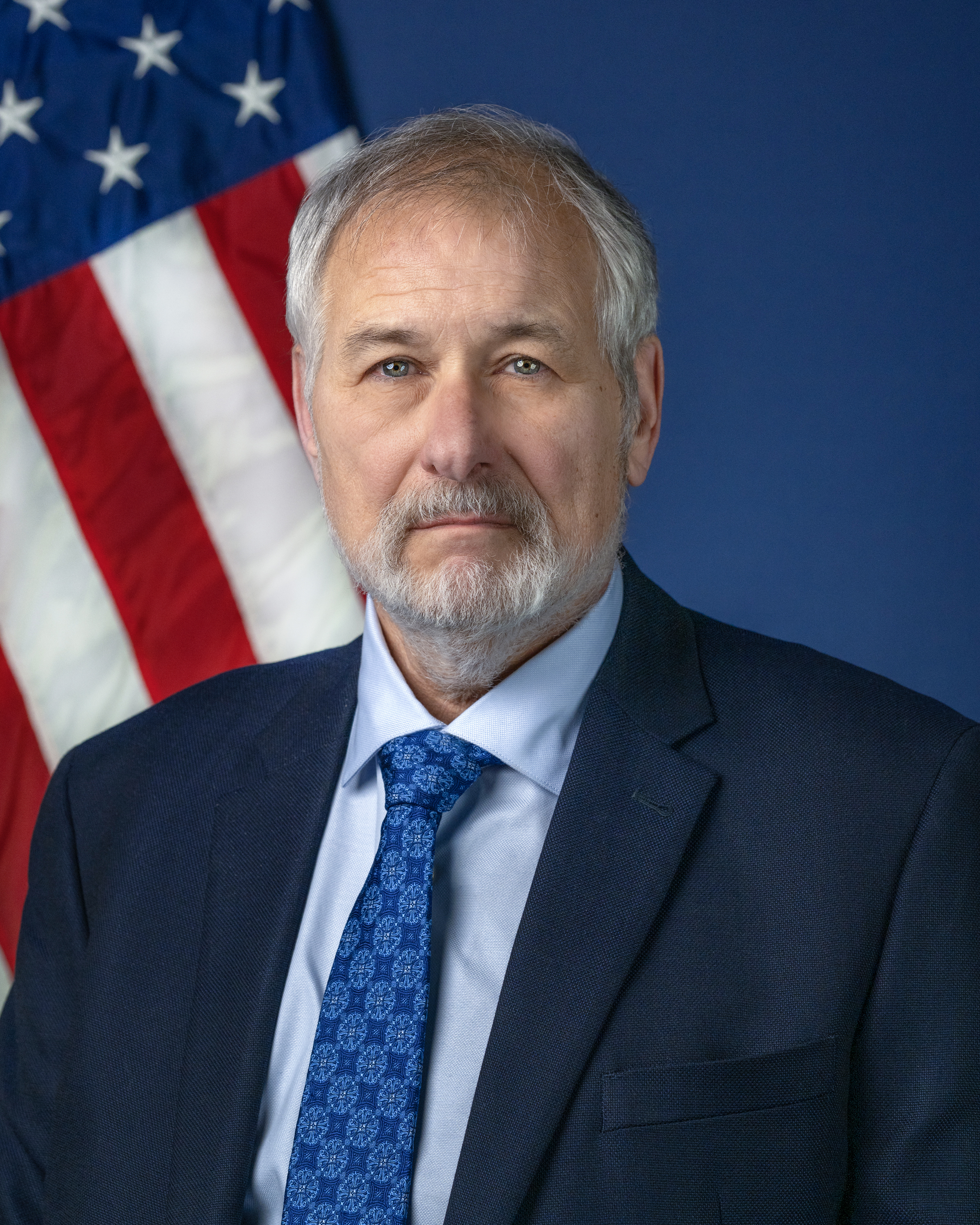
- Stephen Carmel

21st United States Maritime Administration Administrator
- Incumbent
- Assumed office December 19, 2025
- President: Donald J. Trump
- Preceded by: Ann C. Phillips

Personal details
- Spouse: Alison Carmel
- Education: U.S. Merchant Marine Academy; Old Dominion University

Stephen Michael Carmel is an American maritime executive, merchant mariner, maritime-policy specialist and government official serving as the 21st Administrator of the Maritime Administration (MARAD), an agency of the United States Department of Transportation. President Donald Trump nominated Carmel in May 2025, and he was confirmed by the United States Senate on December 18, 2025.

Before entering government, Carmel spent more than four decades in the maritime industry. He began his career as a merchant mariner and shipmaster before moving into shoreside management and holding senior executive positions at Maersk Line Limited and U.S. Marine Management. Carmel has also participated in maritime and national-security advisory bodies and has written and spoken on maritime security, international trade, globalization and Arctic issues.

== Early life and education ==
Carmel was born in Washington, D.C. and graduated from the United States Merchant Marine Academy in 1979 with a Bachelor of Science degree in marine transportation.

He subsequently attended Old Dominion University, earning an M.B.A. in 1993 and an M.A. in economics in 1996.

Carmel has held certifications as a Certified Management Accountant and Certified in Financial Management and has held a United States Coast Guard license as Master, Any Gross Tons, Upon Oceans.

== Maritime career ==
=== Career at sea ===
Carmel began his maritime career in 1979 as a deck officer, sailing primarily aboard tankers for Maritime Overseas Corporation and the Military Sealift Command. He eventually became a shipmaster and received his first command, a 40,000-ton clean-product tanker, at age 26.

Carmel spent approximately eleven years at sea, with the latter portion of his seagoing career serving as master aboard clean-product tankers.

=== U.S. Marine Management ===
After coming ashore, Carmel joined U.S. Marine Management, Inc. (USMMI), where he served as a port captain and program manager.

In 1995, Carmel became vice president of finance at U.S. Marine Management.

=== Maersk Line Limited ===
In 1997, Carmel became a senior vice president at Maersk Line Limited, the U.S.-flag shipping subsidiary of the Maersk group. He also served on the company's board of directors from 1997 until 2005.

Carmel also became involved in maritime-security and national-security matters during his tenure at Maersk.

In 2013, he assumed responsibility for the U.S. Marine Management business unit within Maersk Line Limited. The unit operated tankers, military-special-purpose vessels, survey vessels and other maritime platforms.

=== President of U.S. Marine Management ===
U.S. Marine Management was separated from Maersk Line Limited in 2023 following its sale to Maritime Partners. Carmel became president of the independent company in September 2023.

Carmel remained president of U.S. Marine Management until entering federal service.

== Maritime and national-security policy work ==
Alongside his commercial maritime career, Carmel has served on a number of maritime, naval and national-security advisory bodies.

In 2007, he was appointed to the Chief of Naval Operations Executive Panel, an advisory group providing outside expertise to the Chief of Naval Operations.

Carmel served on the panel until 2016. He also served on the Naval Studies Board and Marine Board of the National Academies of Sciences, Engineering, and Medicine and on the Hydrographic Services Review Board of the National Oceanic and Atmospheric Administration.

In 2009, Carmel was a senior fellow at the Homeland Security Policy Institute at George Washington University.

Carmel was later appointed by President Trump to the Board of Visitors of the United States Merchant Marine Academy. He served on the board from 2018 to 2021.

His policy work has included maritime security, commercial shipping, military logistics, international supply chains, globalization and Arctic shipping.

== Academic and writing career ==
Carmel has written and lectured on maritime security, international shipping, globalization, Arctic issues and the relationship between commercial shipping and national security.

He has taught economics at Old Dominion University as an adjunct professor and has lectured to military and government audiences on globalization and maritime-security issues.

His work has appeared in publications including the Naval War College Review and publications of the United States Naval Institute.

In 2010, the U.S. Naval Institute published Carmel's article "The Big Myth of Somali Pirates", in which he discussed the strategic implications of piracy and international shipping.

In 2013, the Naval War College Review published his article "Globalization, Security, and Economic Well-Being".

His research interests have included trade, conflict and Arctic regional issues.

== Maritime Administrator ==
=== Nomination and confirmation ===
President Donald Trump nominated Carmel on May 6, 2025, to serve as Administrator of the United States Maritime Administration, succeeding Ann C. Phillips. On December 18, 2025, the Senate confirmed Carmel by a vote of 53–43 and Carmel became the 21st Administrator of the Maritime Administration on December 19, 2025.

=== Empire State VII ===
On August 28, 2026 he issued a memorandum to State University of New York’s Maritime College (SUNY Maritime) that he would be activating the training ship Empire State VII for federal service beginning September 1, 2026. This is the first ever activation of a National Security Multi-Mission Vessel (NSMV). The mission has been classified by the commander of the Military Sealift Command.

== Personal life ==
Carmel is married to Alison Parker. He has 1 child and 3 stepchildren.

== Awards and honours ==
In 2017, Carmel received the Meritorious Public Service Award from the Chief of Naval Operations for his work with the Chief of Naval Operations Executive Panel.

== Selected publications ==
- Carmel, Stephen M. (2010). "The Big Myth of Somali Pirates". Proceedings. United States Naval Institute.
- Carmel, Stephen M. (2013). "Globalization, Security, and Economic Well-Being". Naval War College Review. 66 (1).
