= Jerry Dennis =

American writer (born 1954)

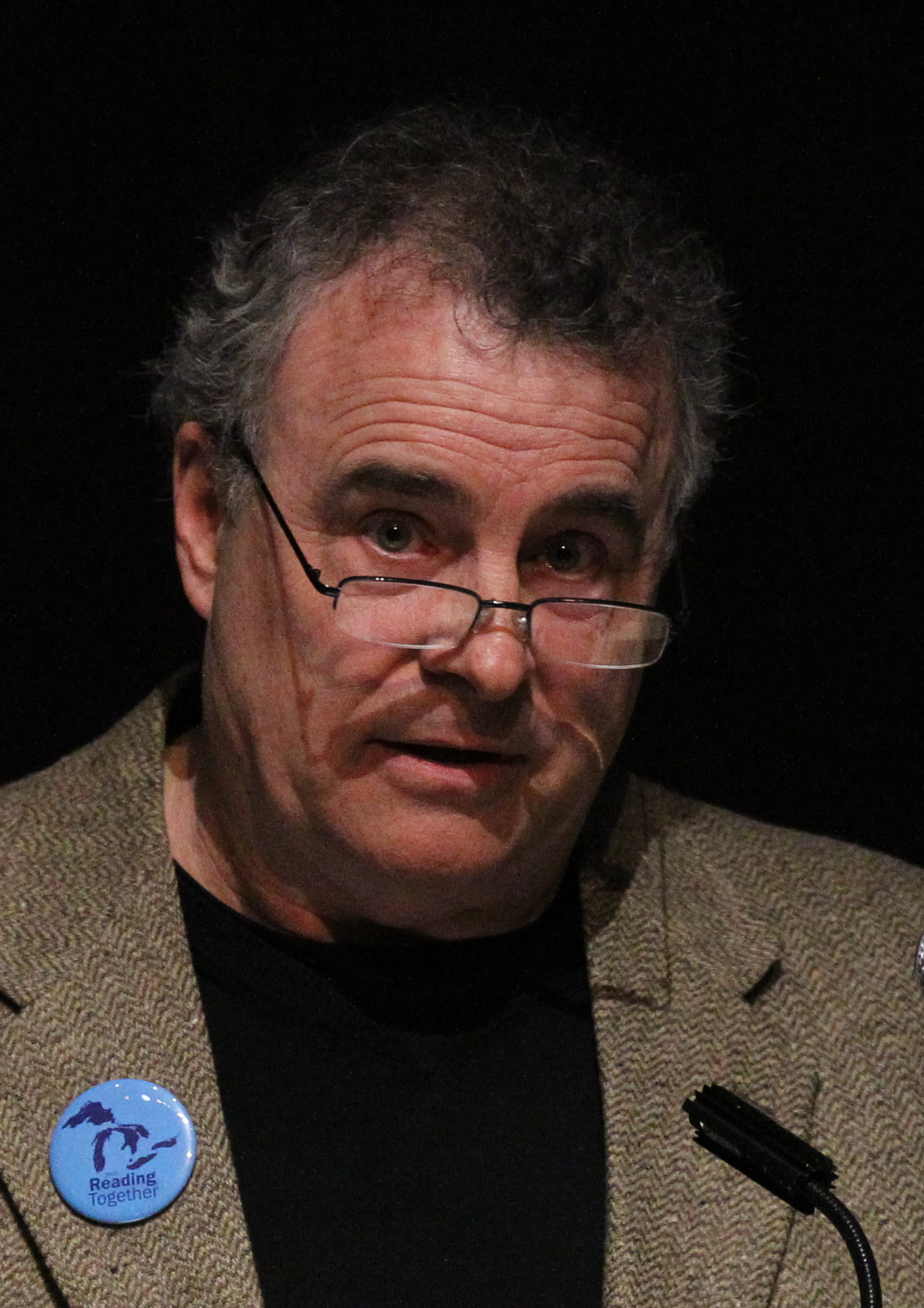
- Dennis in 2015
- Born: 1954 (age 71–72); Flint, Michigan
- Education: University of Louisville; Northern Michigan University; Northwestern Michigan College
- Occupations: Nonfiction writer; short story writer

Jerry Dennis (born 1954) is an American writer of nonfiction and short fiction. He is known for writing about the effect of human culture on the natural environment.

== Early life and education ==
Dennis was born in Flint, Michigan in 1954 and grew up in rural northern Michigan. Dennis received a Bachelor of Arts degree in English from the University of Louisville in 1981, after attending Northern Michigan University and Northwestern Michigan College.

== Career ==
After graduating Dennis worked as a carpenter for five years while establishing himself as a book author and magazine writer.

He has written articles for more than 100 publications, including The New York Times, Smithsonian, Audubon, Sports Afield, Field and Stream, American Way, and the literary magazines Epoch, Witness, Mid-American Review, Pank, and Michigan Quarterly Review. Throughout the 1990s he wrote regular columns for Wildlife Conservation Magazine, the publication of Wildlife Conservation International and the Bronx Zoo, and Canoe and Kayak Magazine. Journalistic assignments sent him to Iceland, Chile, and extensively throughout the U.S. and Canada.

Since 2000 he has been on the faculty of the University of Michigan's Bear River Writers Conference, where he teaches creative non-fiction and nature writing.

As of 2014, he is the author of ten books. In 2015 his best known book is The Living Great Lakes, about his trip around the great lakes in a rickety ship. This book appeared on the Michigan Bestseller Book List for October, 2014.

In 2014, in response to a pricing dispute between his publisher, MacMillan Press, and Amazon, Dennis set up his own publishing house, Big Maple Press, to produce books which will be sold only through independent booksellers.

== Books ==
- Canoeing Michigan Rivers Thunder Bay Press (1986, 2001, 2013)
- The Best Bicycle Tours of Eastern Canada (1992)
- It's Raining Frogs and Fishes HarperCollins (1992, 2013)
- A Place on the Water Macmillan (1993, 2013)
- The Bird in the Waterfall HarperCollins (1996, 2014)
- The River Home Macmillan (1998, 2013)
- From a Wooden Canoe Macmillan (1999, 2014)
- Leelanau: A Portrait of Place (2000)
- Up North in Michigan (2021)
- The Living Great Lakes Macmillan (2004)
- The Windward Shore University of Michigan Press (2011)

== Awards and honors ==
- 2004 Michigan Notable Books
- 2004 Sigurd Olsen Nature Writing Award
- 2004 Great Lakes Culture Best Book Award Non-Fiction
- 2004 The Stuart D. and Vernice M. Gross Award for Literature
- 2003 Alumni Fellows Award, University of Louisville, College of Arts and Sciences
- 1999 Michigan Author of the Year
- 1993, 1996, 1998, and 2003 Best Book of the Year awarded by Outdoor Writers Association of America.
