= USNS Persistent =

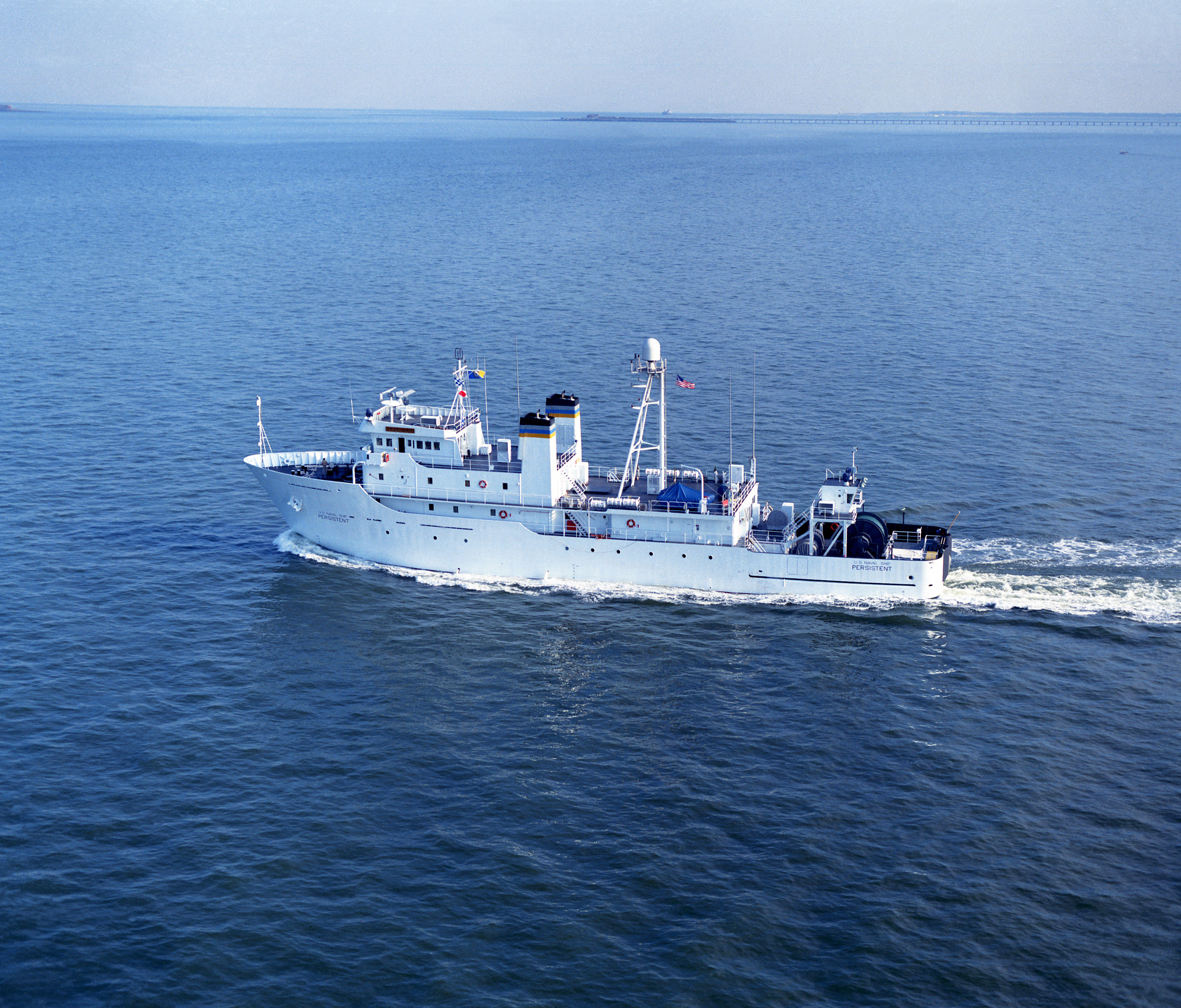
- USNS Persistent (T-AGOS-6)

History

United States
- Awarded: 13 February 1981
- Builder: Tacoma Boatbuilding Company
- Laid down: 22 October 1984
- Launched: 6 April 1985
- In service: 14 August 1985
- Out of service: 12 October 1994
- Stricken: 6 January 1995
- Identification: IMO number: 8835451; MMSI number: 338940000; Callsign: WMAP
- Fate: Transferred to Great Lakes Maritime Academy

General characteristics
- Class & type: Stalwart-class ocean surveillance ship
- Displacement: 1,565 tons (light) 2,535 tons (full)
- Length: 224 ft (68 m)
- Beam: 43 ft (13 m)
- Draft: 15 ft (4.6 m)
- Speed: 11 knots (20 km/h; 13 mph)

USNS Persistent (T-AGOS-6) was a Stalwart-class Modified Tactical Auxiliary General Ocean Surveillance Ship of the United States Navy.

Stalwart-class ships were originally designed to collect underwater acoustical data in support of Cold War anti-submarine warfare operations in the 1980s. Ex-USNS Persistent is now T/S State of Michigan, owned by the U.S. Department of Transportation's Maritime Administration and assigned to the Great Lakes Maritime Academy, Traverse City, Michigan.

== Design ==
The Stalwart-class ocean surveillance ships were succeeded by the longer Victorious-class ocean surveillance ships. Persistent had an overall length of 224 feet (68 m) and a length of 203 feet 6 inches (62.03 m) at its waterline. It had a beam of 43 feet (13 m) and a draft of 15 feet (4.6 m). The surveillance ship had a displacement of 1,600 tonnes (1,600 long tons; 1,800 short tons) at light load and 2,301 tonnes (2,265 long tons; 2,536 short tons) at full load. It was powered by a diesel-electric system of four Caterpillar D-398 diesel-powered generators and two General Electric 550 metric horsepower (540 shp; 400 kW) electric motors. This produced a total of 3,200 metric horsepower (3,200 shp; 2,400 kW) that drove two shafts. It had a gross register tonnage of 1,584 and a deadweight tonnage of 786.

The Stalwart-class ocean surveillance ships had maximum speeds of 11 knots (20 km/h; 13 mph). They were built to be fitted with the Surveillance Towed Array Sensor System (SURTASS) system. The ship had an endurance of thirty days. It had a range of 3,000 miles (2,600 nmi; 4,800 km) and a speed of 11 knots (20 km/h; 13 mph). Its complement was between thirty-two and forty-seven. Its hull design was similar to that of the Powhatan-class fleet ocean tugs.
