= Dummy (nickname) =

Dummy was a nickname commonly applied to "deaf and dumb" (deaf-mute) athletes, especially baseball players, in the late 19th and early 20th century. In that era, the word "dumb" was used to describe someone who could not speak, rather than someone who was stupid; but since the ability to speak was often connected to one's intelligence, the epithets "dumb" and "dummy" became interchangeable with stupidity. Notable persons with the nickname include:

- Dummy Deegan (1874–1957), American baseball pitcher
- Ed Dundon (1859–1893), American baseball pitcher credited with being the first deaf player in major league history
- Dummy Hoy (1862–1961), American baseball center fielder
- Dummy Lebey (1896–1959), American college football player
- Dummy Leitner (1871–1960), American baseball pitcher
- Herbert Murphy (1886–1962), American baseball shortstop
- Dummy Stephenson (1869–1924), American baseball outfielder
- Dummy Taylor (1875–1958), American baseball pitcher
- Earle Taylor (1891–1955), American college football player

== See also ==
- Dummy, the Witch of Sible Hedingham (c. 1788–1863), pseudonym of an elderly deaf-mute man who was one of the last people to be accused of witchcraft in England
- Dummy (disambiguation)
