= Elysian Fields Quarterly =

- Editor: Tom Arneson
- Categories: Literary Baseball Journal
- Frequency: Quarterly
- Publisher: Stephen Lehman
- Founded: 1981 (as The Minneapolis Review of Baseball)
- Country: United States
- Based in: St. Paul, Minnesota
- Language: English
- Website: www.efqreview.com (Archived)

Elysian Fields Quarterly (EFQ) was a literary baseball journal of "writing on baseball from the fan's perspective", published in St. Paul, Minnesota. It featured articles on baseball history and lore.

== History and profile ==
EFQ was founded as The Minneapolis Review of Baseball, by Ken LaZebnik and Steve Lehman. It began publication under its current title in 1992. EFQ was published briefly in 1992–1993 by William C. Brown Company of Dubuque, Iowa, but devolved to its original 'self-published' status after William C. Brown eliminated its baseball division. EFQ ceased to exist in 1995 due to financial difficulties, but was resurrected by Lehman and another contributor in 1998, at the urging of its current publisher, Tom Goldstein.

EFQ had favorable reviews by the Utne Reader as well as NPR.

In December 2008, Tom Goldstein announced in a letter to subscribers that the publication would be on hiatus during the 2009 season. He added that if EFQ "cannot expand on its narrow base to build a cult-like following … there seems little point in trying to re-start the journal a year from now." As of March 2012, the same announcement remains on its website.

== Dave Moore Award ==
From 1999 through 2007, EFQ annually recognized baseball's "most important book" by bestowing the Dave Moore Award. It is named for the late Dave Moore, a well-known Minnesota broadcaster, who loved sports and literature.

=== Recipients ===
- 1999 Roberto Gonzalez Echevarria for The Pride of Havana
- 2000 Darryl Brock for Havana Heat
- 2001 Tom Stanton for The Final Season
- 2002 Charles Korr for The End of Baseball as We Knew It
- 2003 Jim Bouton for Foul Ball
- 2004 William Kashatus for September Swoon
- 2005 Bob McGee for The Greatest Ballpark Ever
- 2006 Brad Snyder for A Well-Paid Slave
- 2007 Norman L. Macht for Connie Mack and the Early Years of Baseball

== See also ==
- Elysian Fields, Hoboken, New Jersey
