= Herbert Murphy =

American baseball player (1886-1962)

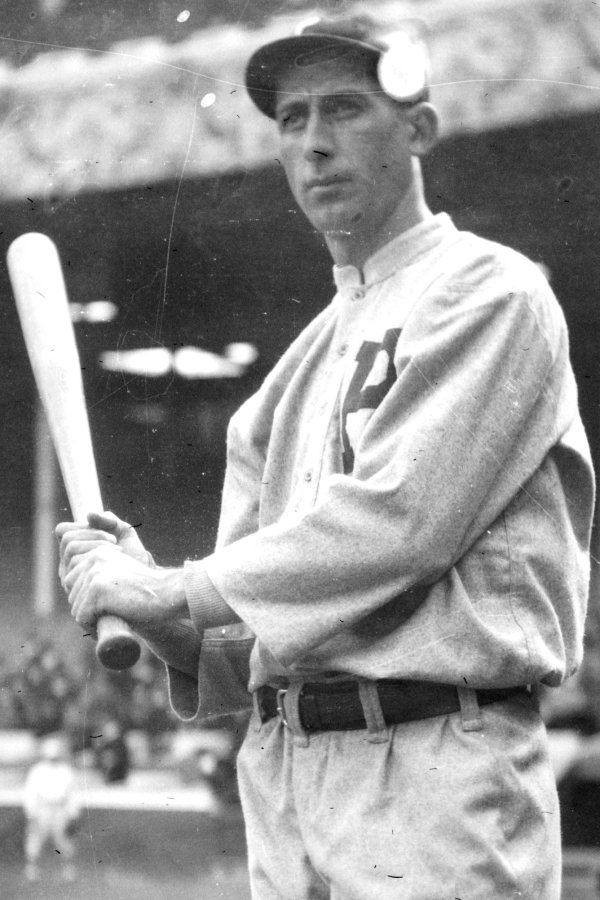
- Murphy in 1914
- Shortstop
- Born: December 18, 1886; Olney, Illinois, U.S.
- Died: August 10, 1962 (aged 75); Tallahassee, Florida, U.S.
- Batted: Right Threw: Right

MLB debut
- April 14, 1914, for the Philadelphia Phillies

Last MLB appearance
- May 7, 1914, for the Philadelphia Phillies

MLB statistics
- Batting average: .154
- Home runs: 0
- Runs batted in: 3
- Stats at Baseball Reference

Teams
- Philadelphia Phillies (1914)

Herbert Courtland "Dummy" Murphy (December 18, 1886 – August 10, 1962) was an American professional baseball infielder. He played in Major League Baseball for the Philadelphia Phillies in 1914 as a shortstop. Partially deaf, he was sometimes referred to by the nickname "Dummy".

== Career ==
Murphy started his professional baseball career in 1912. The following season, with the Thomasville Hornets of the Empire State League, he batted .338 and was drafted by the Phillies in September. He started 1914 as a major league regular. However, he batted just .154 in nine games and made eight errors in the field. He was released in May and went to the Jersey City Skeeters, where he batted .235 the rest of the season.

Murphy spent the next few years in the minor leagues, mostly in the Pacific Coast League. In 1920, he was a player-manager for the South Atlantic League's Charlotte Hornets. He retired soon afterwards.
