= Ann C. Phillips =

American Navy admiral & government official

Ann Phillips
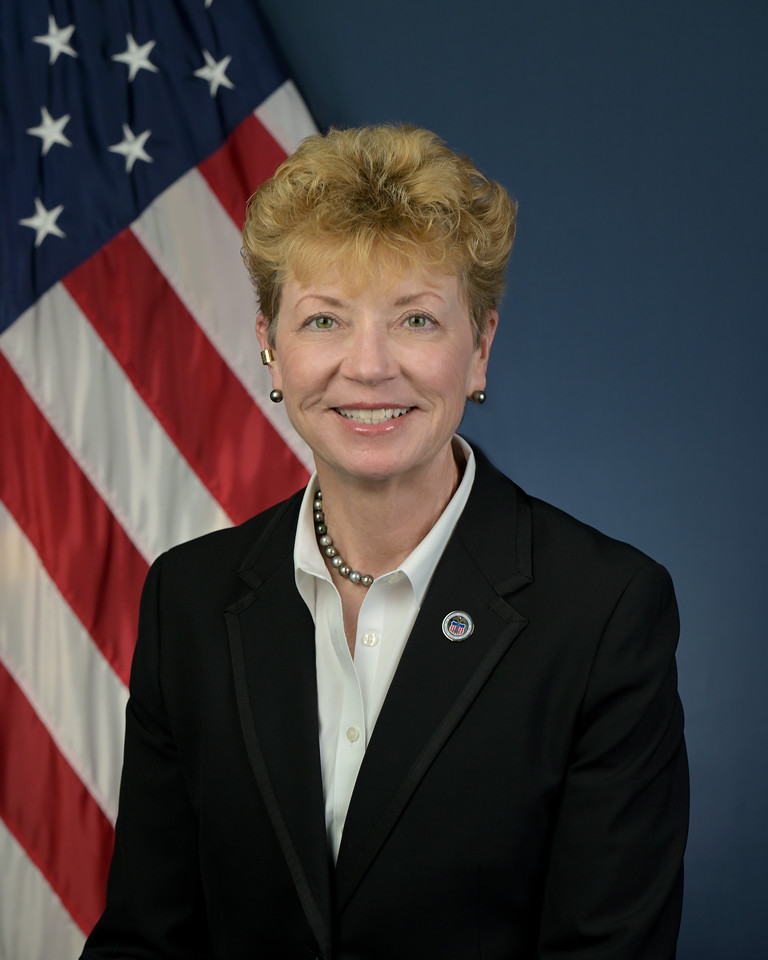
- Phillips in 2022

20th United States Maritime Administration Administrator
- In office May 16, 2022 – January 20, 2025
- President: Joe Biden
- Preceded by: Mark H. Buzby
- Succeeded by: Stephen Carmel

Personal details
- Education: University of North Carolina at Chapel Hill (BA); College of William & Mary (MBA)

Military service
- Branch/service: United States Navy
- Years of service: 1983–2014
- Rank: Rear admiral (lower half)

Ann Claire Phillips is an American retired United States Navy rear admiral who served as the administrator of the United States Maritime Administration from 2022 to 2025.

== Early life and education ==
Phillips earned a Bachelor of Arts degree in French language and literature from the University of North Carolina at Chapel Hill and a Master of Business Administration from the Mason School of Business at the College of William & Mary.

== Career ==
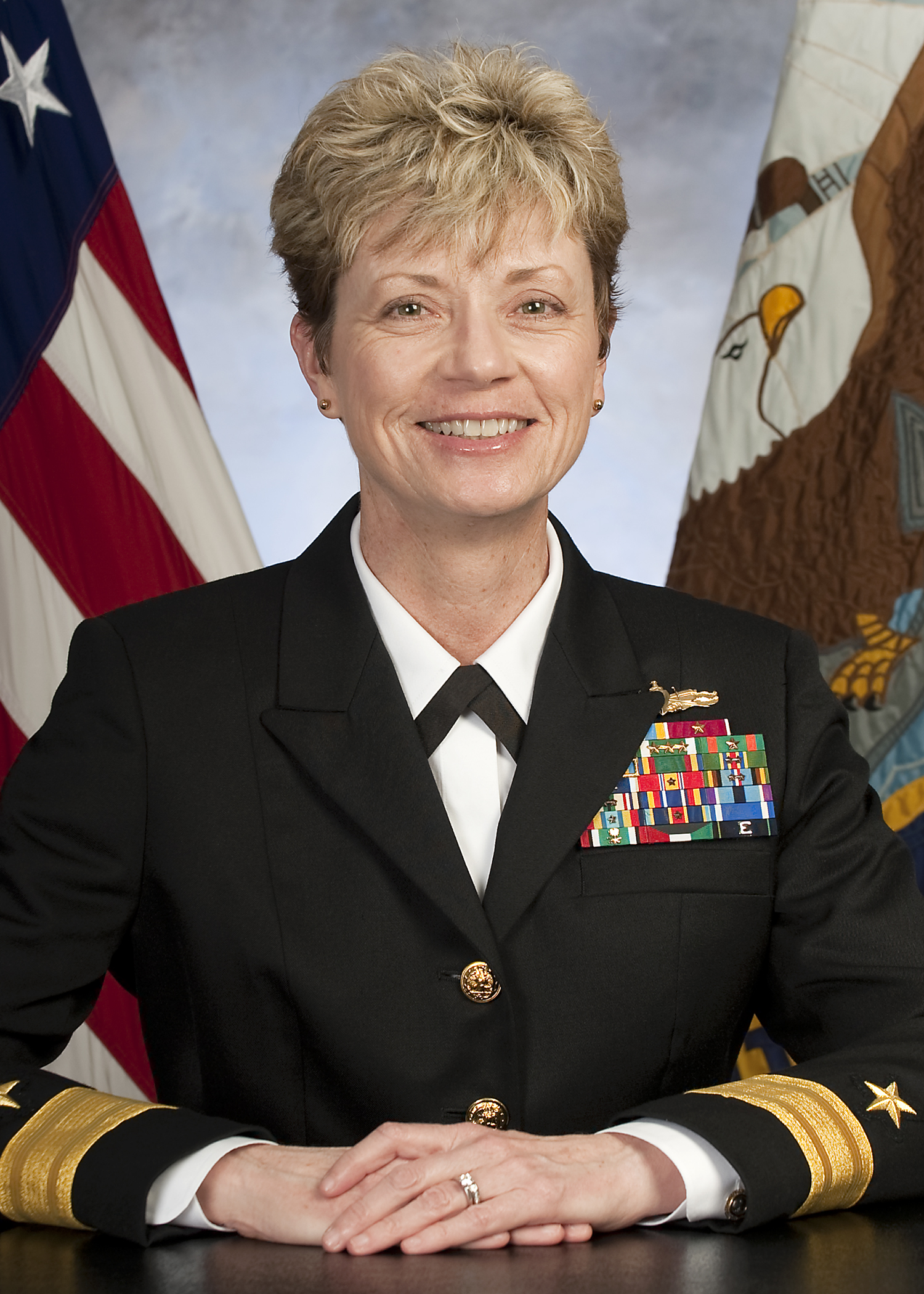
Rear Admiral Ann C. Phillips, circa 2012

From 1983 to 2001, Phillips served as a surface warfare officer in the United States Navy. From 2001 to 2004, she was the commanding officer of the USS Mustin. From 2004 to 2006, she was an executive assistant for the Naval Striking and Support Forces NATO. In 2007 and 2008, she was the commander of Destroyer Squadron 28. In 2008 and 2009, she was a senior fellow at the Chief of Naval Operations Strategic Studies Group. Between 2009 and 2012, she served as deputy director and director of Surface Warfare in the Office of the Chief of Naval Operations. In 2012 and 2013, she was the commander of Expeditionary Strike Group 2. In 2015 and 2016, she worked as a consultant for the Old Dominion Research Foundation. From 2014 to 2018, she was an associate at Burdeshaw Associates, a business management and consulting firm. From 2018 to 2022, Phillips served as a special assistant to Virginia Governor Ralph Northam for coastal adaptation and protection.

=== Nomination to Maritime Administration ===
On October 14, 2021, President Joe Biden nominated Phillips to be the next administrator of the Maritime Administration in the Department of Transportation. The Senate's Commerce Committee held hearings on her nomination on December 16, 2021. The nomination ultimately expired at the end of the year and was returned to the President on January 3, 2022. President Biden resent Phillips' nomination the following day, and on February 2, 2022, the committee favorably reported it to the entire Senate floor. The United States Senate confirmed her nomination on May 10, 2022 by a 75 to 22 vote. She was sworn in on May 16, 2022.
