= Luther (surname) =

As a German surname, Luther is derived from a Germanic personal name compounded from the words liut, "salvation", and heri, "army". As a rare English surname, it means lute player. Luther is also derived from the Greek name Eleutherius. Eleutherius is a cognate of the Greek word eleutheros (ἐλεύθερος) which means "free".

As a personal name, Luther is a boy's name of German origin meaning "the salvation army". It was once restricted to Evangelical Protestants honoring the ecclesiastical reformer and theologian Martin Luther, founder of the Protestant Church.

== Notable people ==
- Alan Harold Luther (born 1940), American theoretical physicist
- Bill Luther (born 1945), American congressman from Minnesota
- Bobbi Sue Luther (born 1978), American model and actress
- Cal Luther (1930–2021), American basketball coach
- Charles Luther (sprinter) (1885–1962), Swedish Olympic sprinter
- Charles Luther (soldier) (1880–1961), English soldier and cricketer
- Darlene Luther (1947–2002), American politician
- Frank Luther (1899–1980), American musician
- George Luther (1823–1884), American politician
- Hans Luther (1879–1962), German politician and Chancellor of Germany
- Harold C. Luther (1915–1973), American politician from New York
- Jeremy Luther (born 1973), American basketball coach
- John Luther (MP) (c. 1739–1786), English Member of Parliament
- Martin Christian Luther (1883–1963), Estonians entrepreneur and politician
- Martin Luther (diplomat) (1895–1945), German diplomat from 1940–1945 and a member of the Nazi Party
- Robert Luther (1822–1900), German astronomer (full name Karl Theodor Robert Luther)
- Robert Luther (Chemist) (1867/8–1945), German scientist (chemistry, photography)
- Ryan Luther (born 1995), American professional basketball player.
- Sally Luther (1918–2015), American politician from Minnesota
- Sidney A. von Luther (1925–1985), American politician, New York state senator
- Suzanne Luther, American politician, Missouri state representative
- Thomas Luther (born 1969), German chess player
- T. J. Luther (born 2000), American football player

== Arts, entertainment and media ==
- Lex Luthor, a comic book villain from DC Comics
- Detective Chief Inspector John Luther, the protagonist of the British BBC television series Luther

== See also ==
- Luther (disambiguation)
- Luther (given name)
- Luter (surname)
