= Lutero =

Lutero is a Portuguese and Spanish name meaning "Luther". Notable people with this name include:

- Lutero Simango (born 1960), Mozambican politician
- Lutero Vargas (1912–1989), Brazilian politician, son of Getúlio Vargas
- Martinho Lutero Galati (1953–2020), Brazilian conductor
