= List of Major League Baseball annual strikeout leaders =

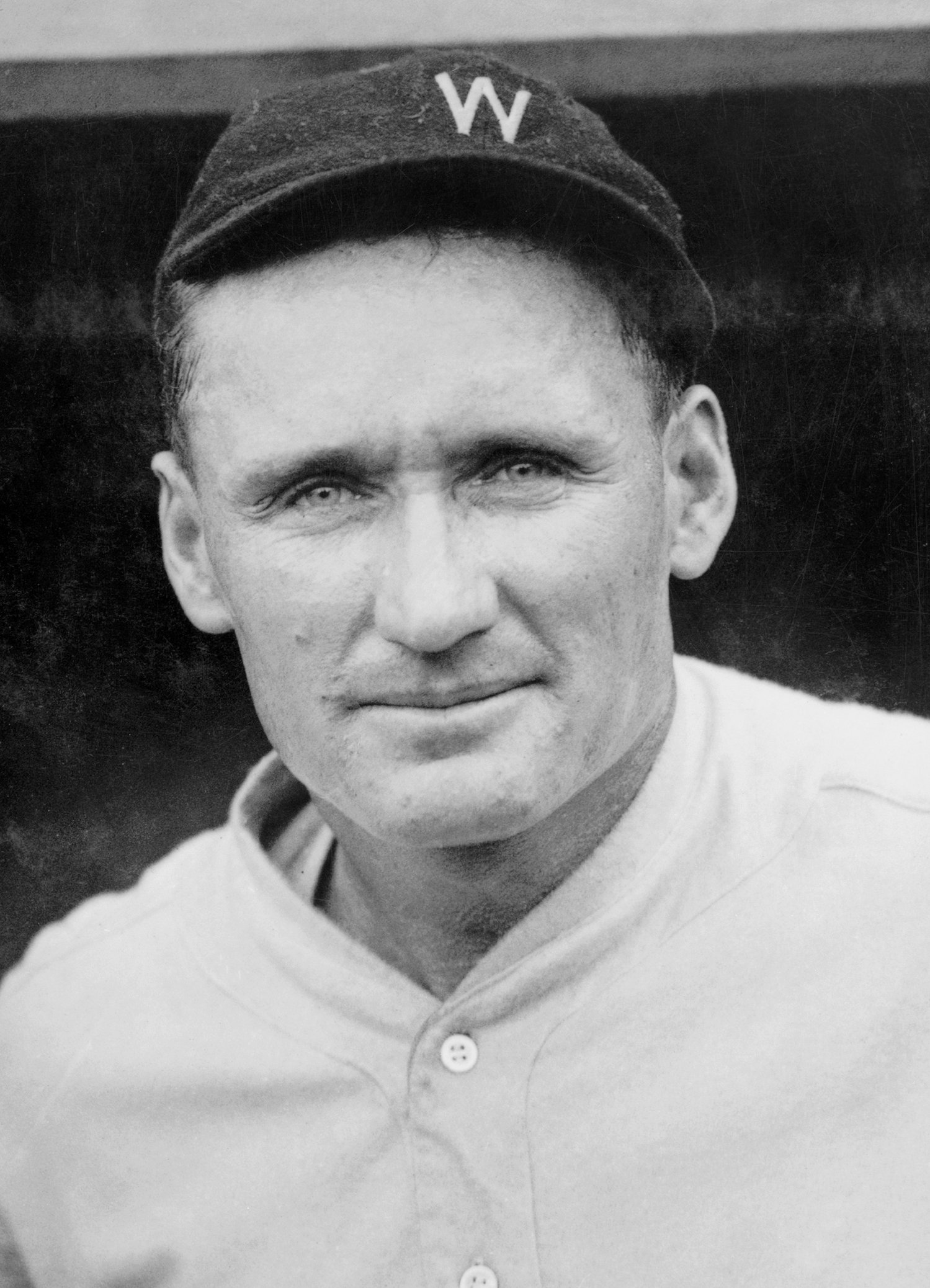
Walter Johnson holds the record with 12 different seasons that he was a strikeout leader, including 8 consecutive from 1912 through 1919. Johnson was one of the five charter members of the Baseball Hall of Fame.

In baseball, the strikeout is a statistic used to evaluate pitchers. A pitcher earns a strikeout when he puts out the batter he is facing by throwing a ball through the strike zone, "defined as that area over homeplate (sic) the upper limit of which is a horizontal line at the midpoint between the top of the shoulders and the top of the uniform pants, and the lower level is a line at the hollow beneath the kneecap", which is not put in play. Strikeouts are awarded in four situations: if the batter is put out on a third strike caught by the catcher (to "strike out swinging" or "strike out looking"); if the pitcher throws a third strike which is not caught with fewer than two outs; if the batter becomes a baserunner on an uncaught third strike; or if the batter bunts the ball into foul territory with two strikes.

Major League Baseball recognizes the player or players in each league^{[a]} with the most strikeouts each season. Jim Devlin led the National League in its inaugural season of 1876; he threw 122 strikeouts for the Louisville Grays. The American League's first winner was Hall of Fame pitcher Cy Young, who captured the American League Triple Crown in 1901 by striking out 158 batters, along with leading the league in wins and earned run average. Walter Johnson led the American League in strikeouts twelve times during his Hall of Fame career, most among all players. He is followed by Nolan Ryan, who captured eleven titles between both leagues (nine in the American League and two in the National League). Randy Johnson won nine strikeout titles, five coming with the Arizona Diamondbacks. Three players have won seven strikeout championships: Dazzy Vance, who leads the National League; Bob Feller; and Lefty Grove. Grover Cleveland Alexander and Rube Waddell led their league six times, and five-time winners include Steve Carlton, Roger Clemens, Sam McDowell, Christy Mathewson, Amos Rusie, and Tom Seaver.

There are several players with a claim to the single-season strikeout record. Among recognized major leagues, Matt Kilroy accumulated the highest single-season total, with 513 strikeouts for the Baltimore Orioles of the American Association in 1886. However, his name does not appear on Major League Baseball's single-season leaders list, since the American Association was independent of the constituent leagues that currently make up Major League Baseball: for the same reason, several other players with high totals, including 1886 American Association runner-up Toad Ramsey (499) and 1884 Union Association leader Hugh Daily (483) also do not appear.

In the National League, Charles "Old Hoss" Radbourn struck out 441 batters in 1884 for the Providence Grays; however, the Providence franchise folded after the 1885 season and has no successor. Accordingly, Major League Baseball recognizes the runner-up from 1884, Charlie Buffinton of the Boston Red Sox, as the record-holder with 417 strikeouts. In the American League, Ryan holds the record with 383 strikeouts in 1973.

The largest margin of victory for a champion is 156 strikeouts, achieved in 1883 when Tim Keefe of the American Association's New York Metropolitans posted 359 against Bobby Mathews' 203. The National League's largest margin was achieved in 1999, when Randy Johnson struck out 143 more batters than Kevin Brown. Ryan's 1973 margin of 125 strikeouts over Bert Blyleven is the largest American League victory. Although ties for the championship are rare, they have occurred; Claude Passeau and Bucky Walters each struck out 137 National League batters in 1939, and Tex Hughson and Bobo Newsom tied in the American League with 113 strikeouts each in 1942. Their total is the lowest number of strikeouts accumulated to lead a league in Major League Baseball history (although Jacob deGrom only struck out 104 National League batters in 2020, the season was shortened by a pandemic to 60 games, or 37.04% of a regular season; had that season run a full 162 games, that would have been a net of 281 strikeouts).

== Key ==
Year	Links to the corresponding "year in baseball" or "Major League Baseball season" article
Leader	Player with the highest number of strikeouts in the league
K	Number of strikeouts^{[b]}
Runner-up	Player with the second-best strikeout total in the league
League	Denoted only for players outside of the modern major leagues
†	Member of the National Baseball Hall of Fame and Museum

== National League ==
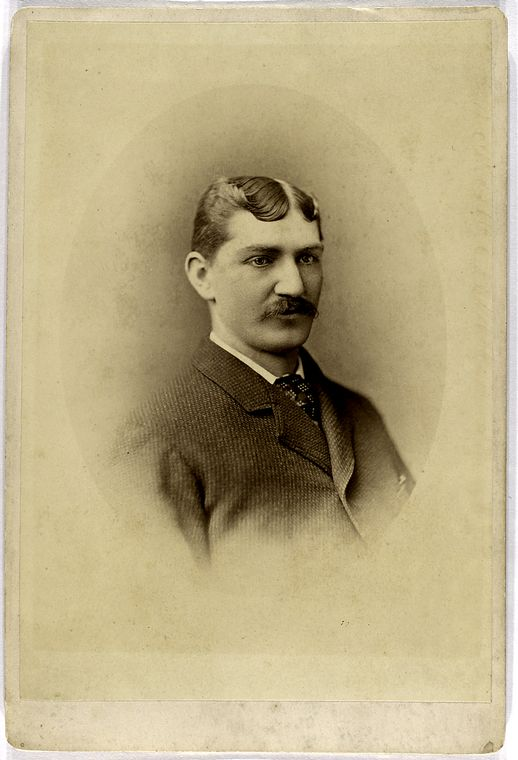
Tommy Bond won the triple crown in 1877, leading the National League in wins, strikeouts, and earned run average.

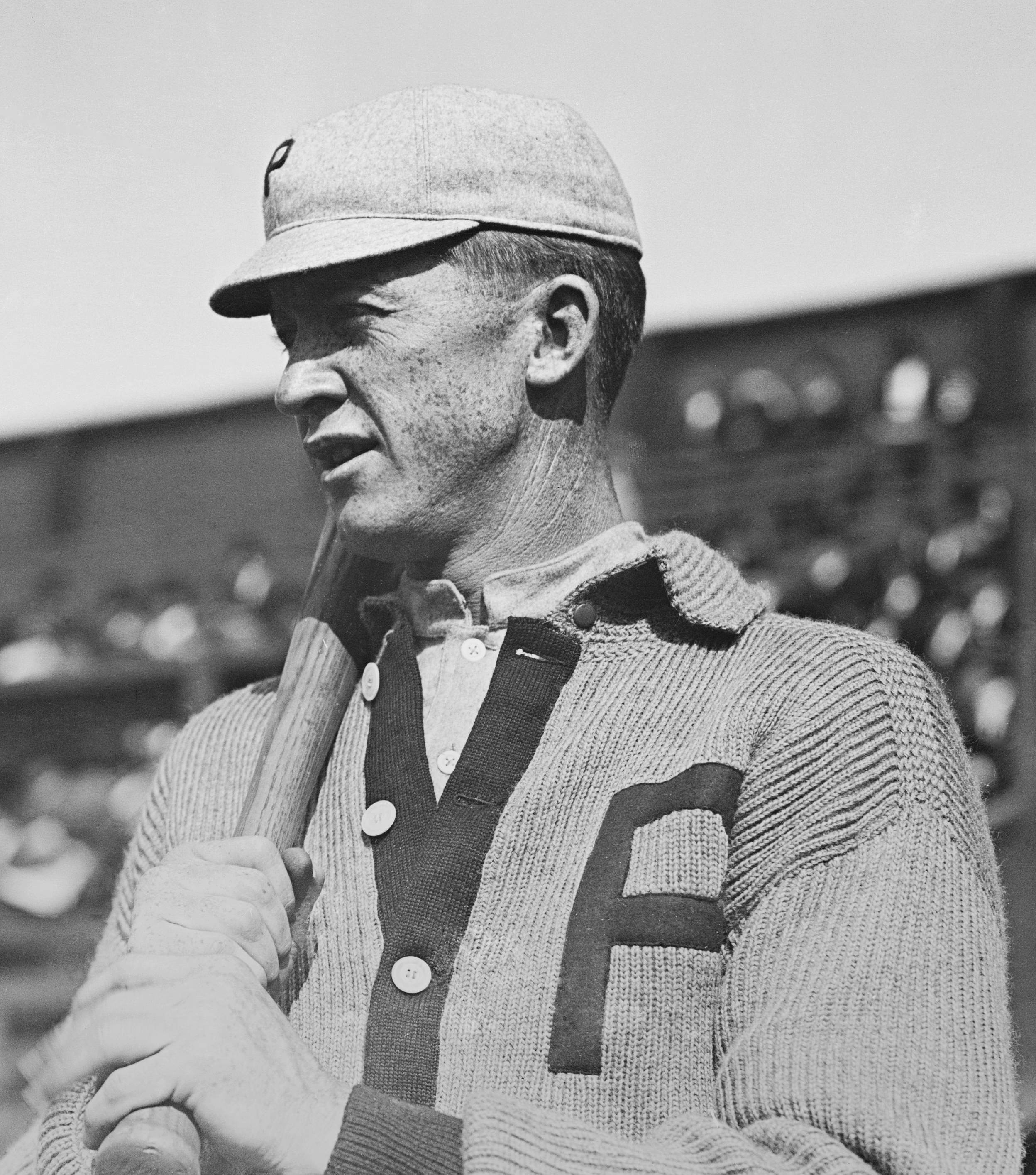
Grover Cleveland Alexander led the National League in strikeouts six times in nine seasons.

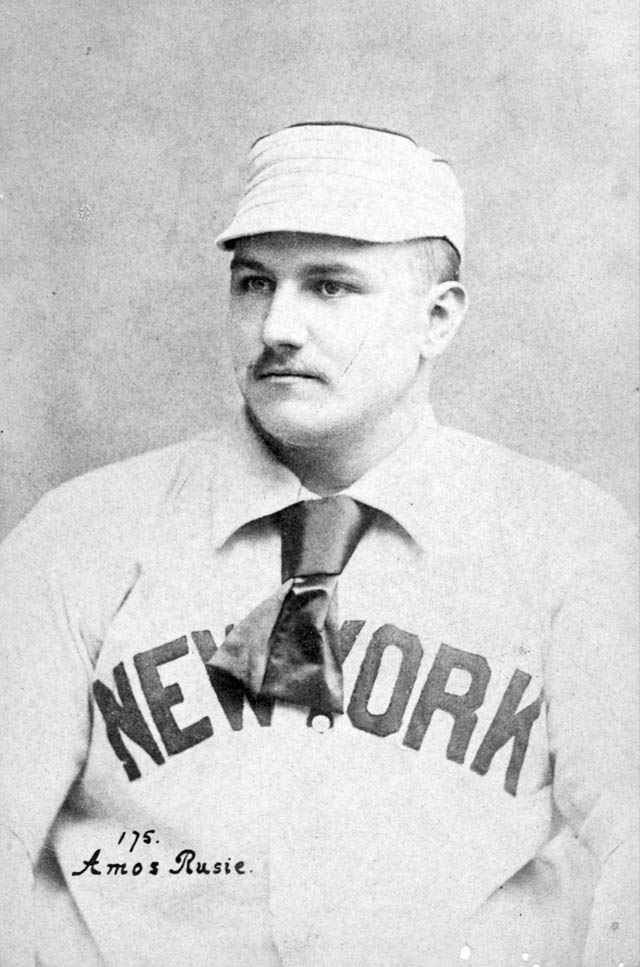
Amos Rusie led the National League in strikeouts a total of five times with two different teams.

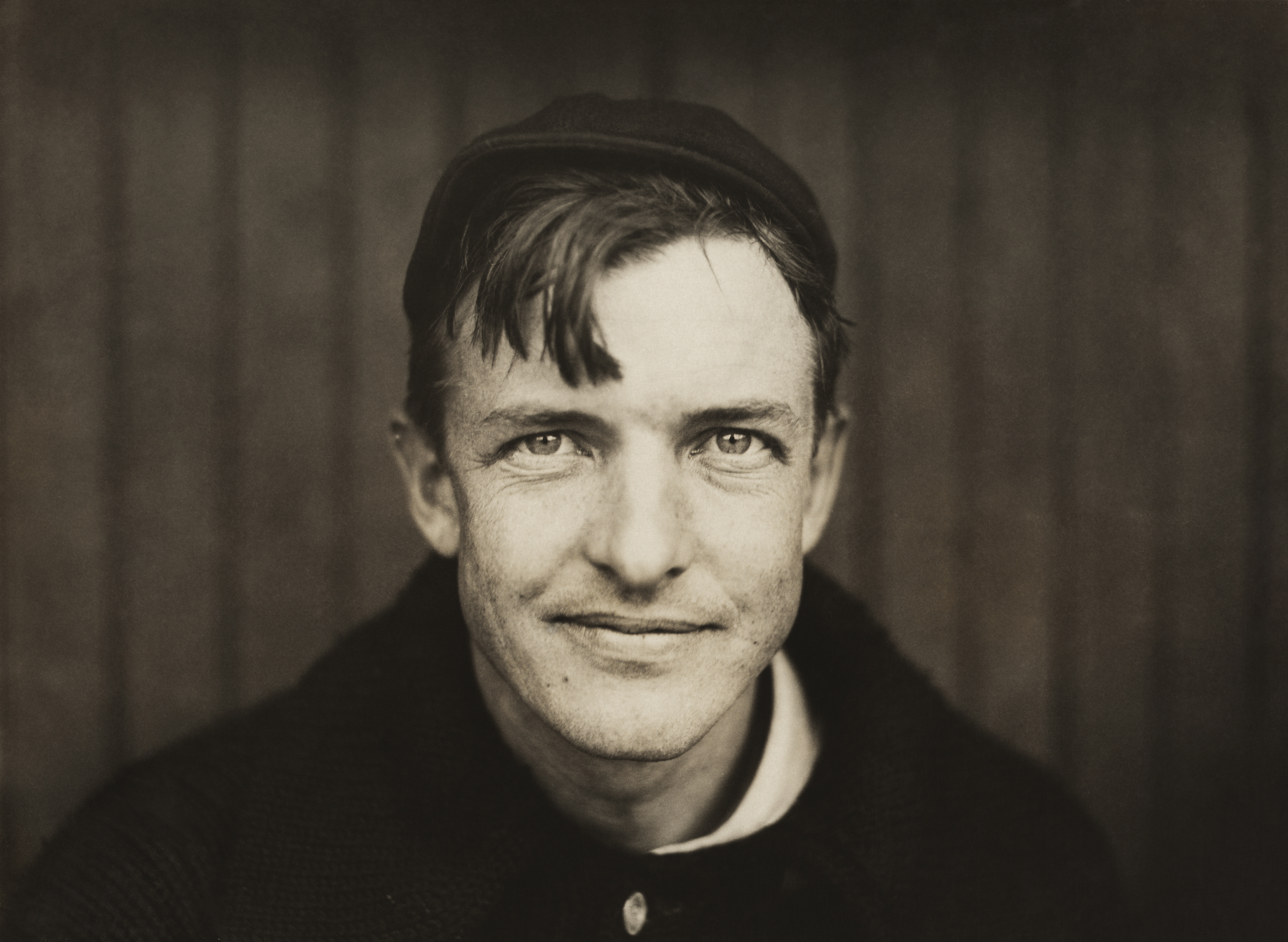
From 1903 to 1908, Christy Mathewson led the National League in strikeouts in five of six years.

Hall of Famer Sandy Koufax led the National League in strikeouts four times before retiring at the age of 30.

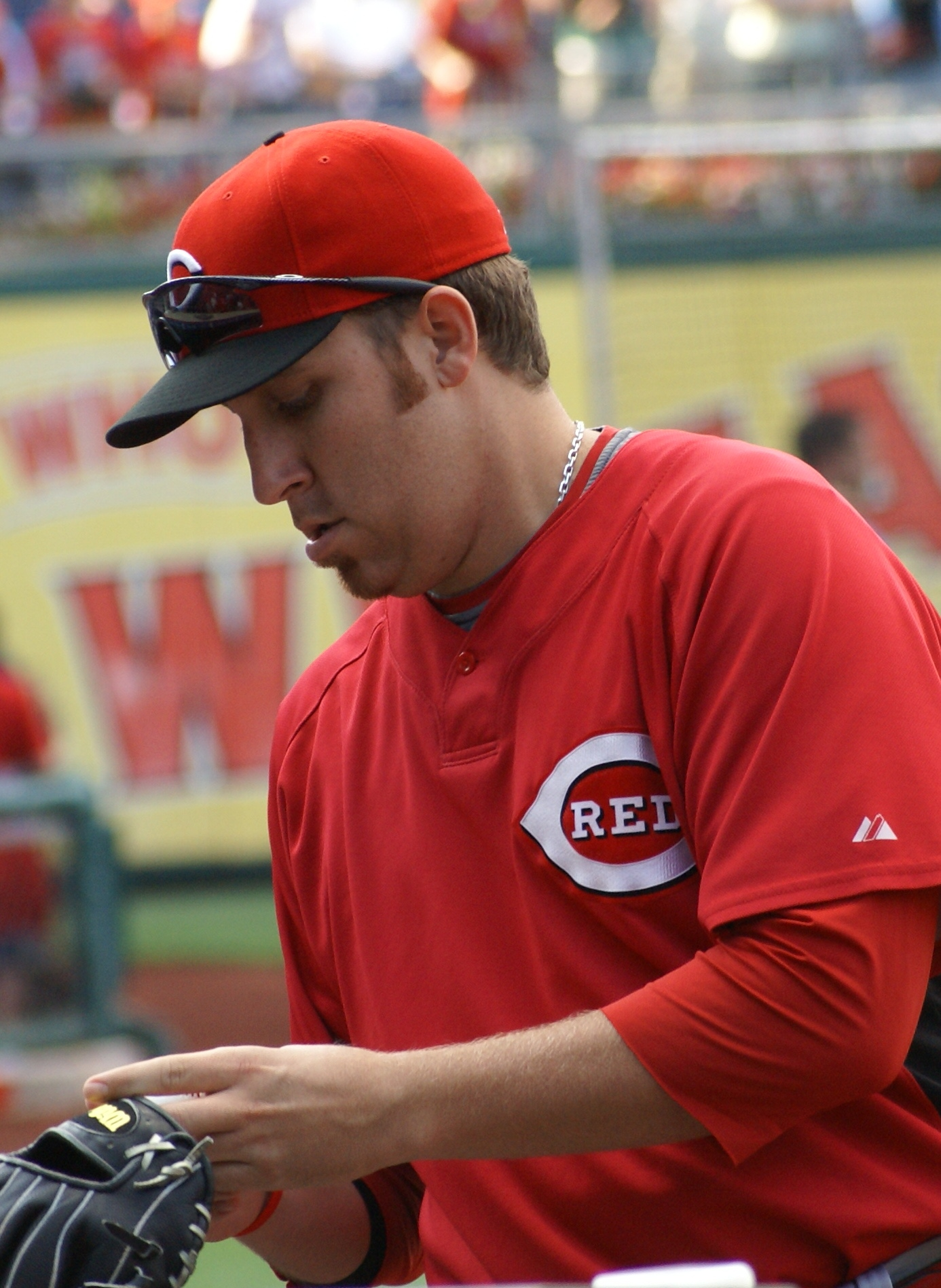
Aaron Harang defeated Jake Peavy for the strikeout title in 2006 by one strikeout.

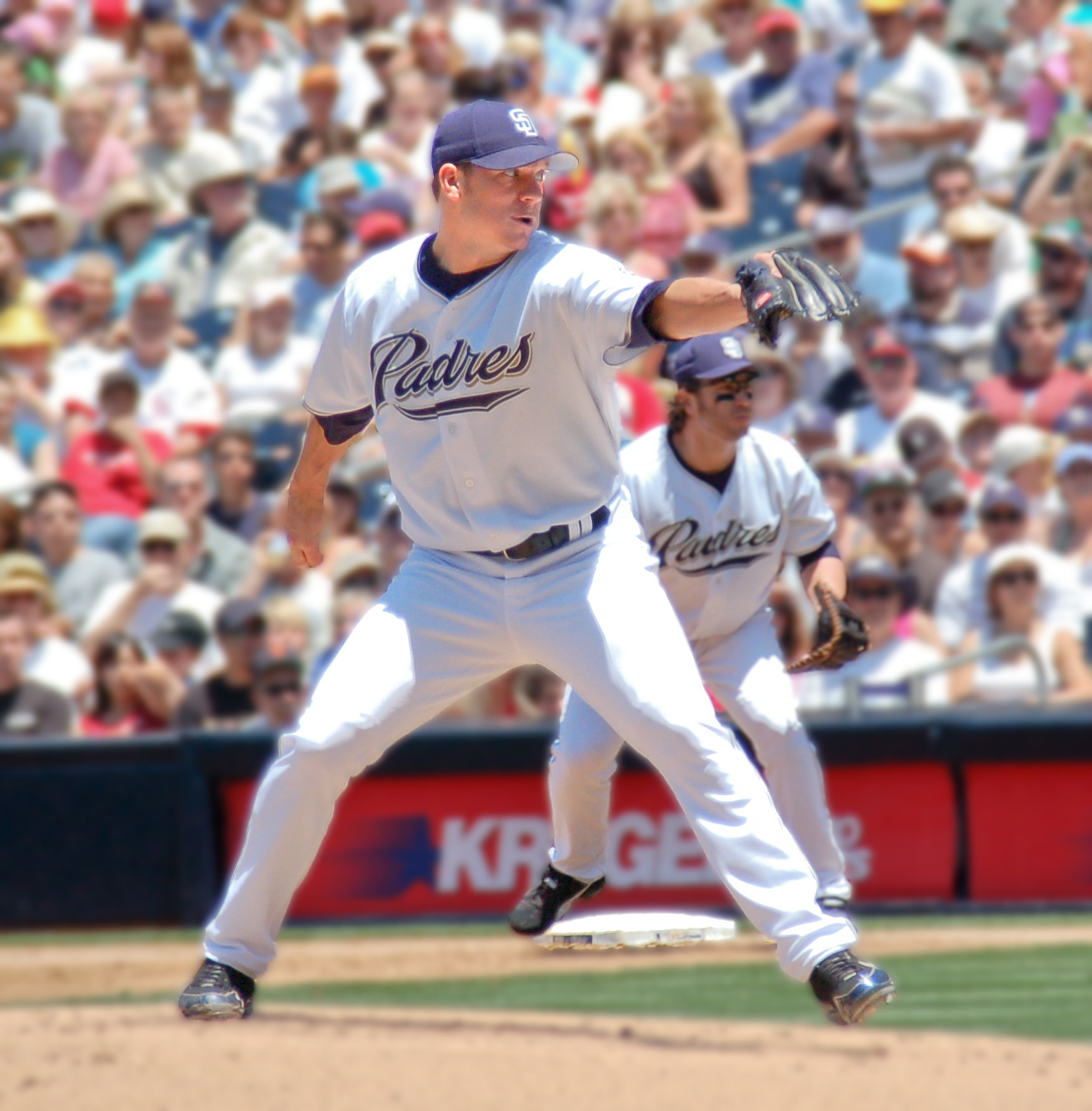
Jake Peavy's 240 strikeouts in 2007 led all National League pitchers. Peavy also won the pitching triple crown the same year.

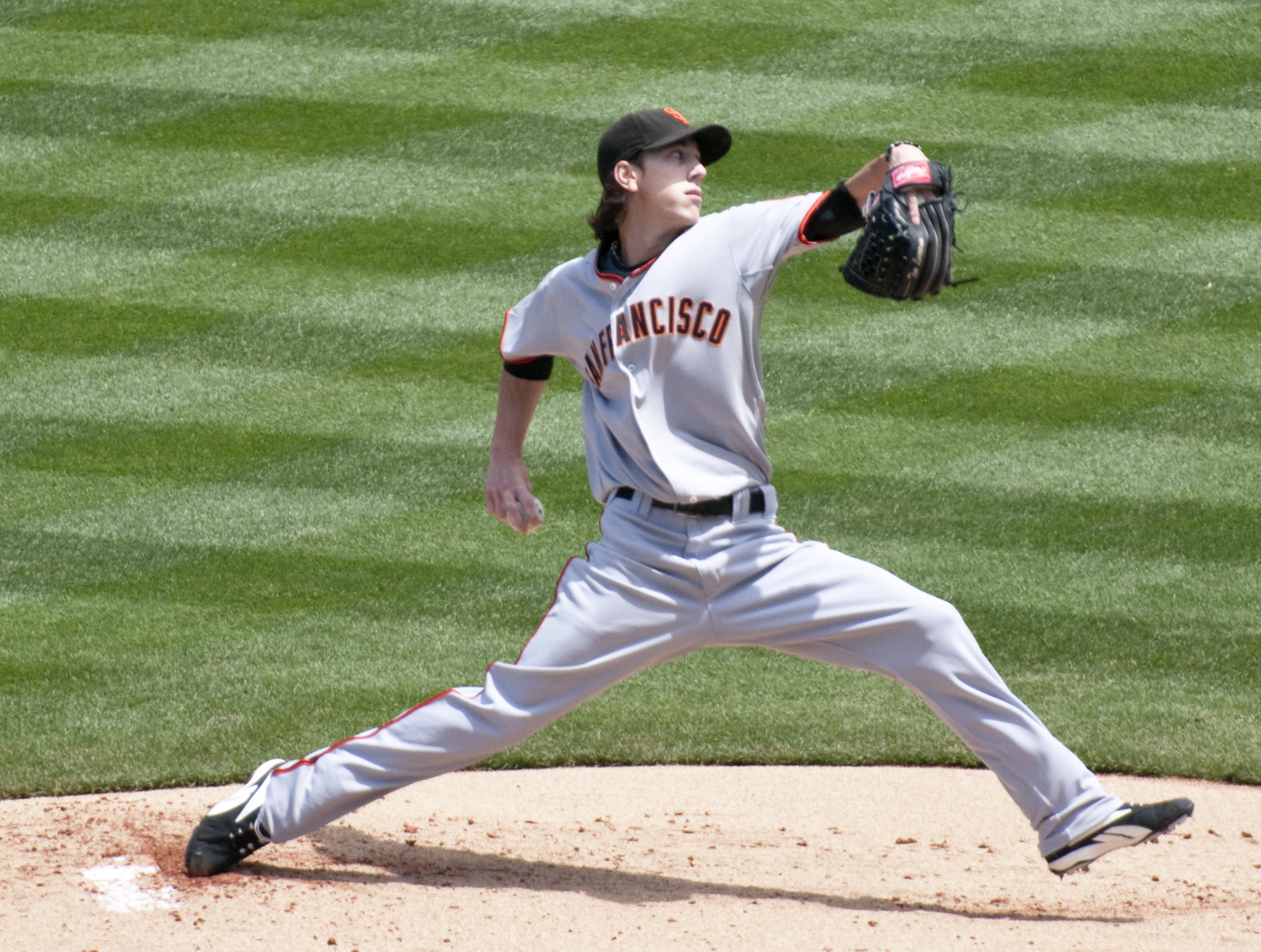
Tim Lincecum led the National League in strikeouts in 2008, 2009, and 2010.

Year	Leader	K	Team	Runner-up	K	Ref
1876	Jim Devlin	122	Louisville Grays	George Bradley	103	
1877	Tommy Bond	170	Boston Red Caps	Jim Devlin	141	
1878	Tommy Bond	182	Boston Red Caps	Will White	169	
1879	John Montgomery Ward^{†}	239	Providence Grays	Will White	232	
1880	Larry Corcoran	268	Chicago White Stockings	Jim McCormick	260	
1881	George Derby	212	Detroit Wolverines	Jim McCormick	178	
1882	Charles Radbourn^{†}	201	Providence Grays	Jim McCormick	200	
1883	Jim Whitney	345	Boston Beaneaters	Charles Radbourn^{†}	315	
1884	Charles Radbourn^{†}	441	Providence Grays	Charlie Buffinton	417	
1885	John Clarkson^{†}	308	Chicago White Stockings	Mickey Welch^{†}	258	
1886	Lady Baldwin	323	Detroit Wolverines	John Clarkson^{†}	313	
1887	John Clarkson^{†}	237	Chicago White Stockings	Tim Keefe^{†}	189	
1888	Tim Keefe^{†}	335	New York Giants	John Clarkson^{†}	223	
1889	John Clarkson^{†}	284	Boston Beaneaters	Tim Keefe^{†}	225	
1890	Amos Rusie^{†}	341	New York Giants	Bill Hutchison	289	
1891	Amos Rusie^{†}	337	New York Giants	Bill Hutchison	261	
1892	Bill Hutchison	314	Chicago White Stockings	Amos Rusie^{†}	304	
1893	Amos Rusie^{†}	208	New York Giants	Brickyard Kennedy	107	
1894	Amos Rusie^{†}	195	New York Giants	Ted Breitenstein	140	
1895	Amos Rusie^{†}	201	New York Giants	Kid Nichols^{†}	148	
1896	Cy Young^{†}	140	Cleveland Spiders	Pink Hawley	137	
1897	Doc McJames; Cy Seymour	156	Washington Senators; New York Giants	Joe Corbett	149	
1898	Cy Seymour	239	New York Giants	Doc McJames	178	
1899	Noodles Hahn	145	Cincinnati Reds	Cy Seymour	142	
1900	Noodles Hahn	132	Cincinnati Reds	Rube Waddell^{†}	130	
1901	Noodles Hahn	239	Cincinnati Reds	Bill Donovan	226	
1902	Vic Willis^{†}	225	Boston Beaneaters	Doc White	185	
1903	Christy Mathewson^{†}	267	New York Giants	Joe McGinnity^{†}	171	
1904	Christy Mathewson^{†}	212	New York Giants	Vic Willis^{†}	196	
1905	Christy Mathewson^{†}	206	New York Giants	Red Ames	198	
1906	Fred Beebe	171	Chicago Cubs; St. Louis Cardinals	Francis "Big Jeff" Pfeffer	158	
1907	Christy Mathewson^{†}	178	New York Giants	Bob Ewing	147	
1908	Christy Mathewson^{†}	259	New York Giants	Nap Rucker	199	
1909	Orval Overall	205	Chicago Cubs	Nap Rucker	201	
1910	Earl Moore	185	Philadelphia Phillies	Christy Mathewson^{†}	184	
1911	Rube Marquard^{†}	237	New York Giants	Grover Cleveland Alexander^{†}	227	
1912	Grover Cleveland Alexander^{†}	195	Philadelphia Phillies	Claude Hendrix	176	
1913	Tom Seaton	168	Philadelphia Phillies	Jeff Tesreau	167	
1914	Grover Cleveland Alexander^{†}	214	Philadelphia Phillies	Jeff Tesreau	189	
1915	Grover Cleveland Alexander^{†}	241	Philadelphia Phillies	Jeff Tesreau	176	
1916	Grover Cleveland Alexander^{†}	167	Philadelphia Phillies	Larry Cheney	166	
1917	Grover Cleveland Alexander^{†}	200	Philadelphia Phillies	Hippo Vaughn	195	
1918	Hippo Vaughn	148	Chicago Cubs	Wilbur Cooper	117	
1919	Hippo Vaughn	141	Chicago Cubs	Hod Eller	137	
1920	Grover Cleveland Alexander^{†}	173	Chicago Cubs	Burleigh Grimes^{†} Hippo Vaughn	131	
1921	Burleigh Grimes	136	Brooklyn Robins	Wilbur Cooper	134	
1922	Dazzy Vance^{†}	134	Brooklyn Robins	Wilbur Cooper	129	
1923	Dazzy Vance^{†}	197	Brooklyn Robins	Dolf Luque	151	
1924	Dazzy Vance^{†}	262	Brooklyn Robins	Burleigh Grimes^{†}	135	
1925	Dazzy Vance^{†}	221	Brooklyn Robins	Dolf Luque	140	
1926	Dazzy Vance^{†}	140	Brooklyn Robins	Charlie Root	127	
1927	Dazzy Vance^{†}	184	Brooklyn Robins	Charlie Root	145	
1928	Dazzy Vance^{†}	200	Brooklyn Robins	Pat Malone	155	
1929	Pat Malone	166	Chicago Cubs	Watty Clark	140	
1930	Bill Hallahan	177	St. Louis Cardinals	Dazzy Vance^{†}	173	
1931	Bill Hallahan	159	St. Louis Cardinals	Carl Hubbell^{†}	155	
1932	Dizzy Dean^{†}	191	St. Louis Cardinals	Carl Hubbell^{†}	137	
1933	Dizzy Dean^{†}	199	St. Louis Cardinals	Carl Hubbell^{†}	156	
1934	Dizzy Dean^{†}	195	St. Louis Cardinals	Van Mungo	184	
1935	Dizzy Dean^{†}	190	St. Louis Cardinals	Carl Hubbell^{†}	150	
1936	Van Mungo	238	Brooklyn Dodgers	Dizzy Dean^{†}	195	
1937	Carl Hubbell^{†}	159	New York Giants	Lee Grissom	149	
1938	Clay Bryant	135	Chicago Cubs	Paul Derringer	132	
1939	Claude Passeau^{[c]} Bucky Walters^{[c]}	137	Cincinnati Reds; Philadelphia Phillies; Chicago Cubs	Mort Cooper	130	
1940	Kirby Higbe	137	Philadelphia Phillies	Claude Passeau; Whit Wyatt	124	
1941	Johnny Vander Meer	202	Cincinnati Reds	Whit Wyatt	176	
1942	Johnny Vander Meer	186	Cincinnati Reds	Mort Cooper	152	
1943	Johnny Vander Meer	174	Cincinnati Reds	Mort Cooper	141	
1944	Bill Voiselle	161	New York Giants	Max Lanier	141	
1945	Preacher Roe	148	Pittsburgh Pirates	Hal Gregg	139	
1946	Johnny Schmitz	135	Chicago Cubs	Kirby Higbe	134	
1947	Ewell Blackwell	193	Cincinnati Reds	Ralph Branca	148	
1948	Harry Brecheen	149	St. Louis Cardinals	Rex Barney	138	
1949	Warren Spahn^{†}	151	Boston Braves	Don Newcombe	149	
1950	Warren Spahn^{†}	191	Boston Braves	Ewell Blackwell	188	
1951	Don Newcombe; Warren Spahn^{†}	164	Brooklyn Dodgers; Boston Braves	Sal Maglie	146	
1952	Warren Spahn^{†}	183	Boston Braves	Bob Rush	157	
1953	Robin Roberts^{†}	198	Philadelphia Phillies	Carl Erskine	187	
1954	Robin Roberts^{†}	185	Philadelphia Phillies	Harvey Haddix	184	
1955	Sam Jones	198	Chicago Cubs	Robin Roberts^{†}	160	
1956	Sam Jones	176	Chicago Cubs	Harvey Haddix	170	
1957	Jack Sanford	188	Philadelphia Phillies	Moe Drabowsky; Dick Drott	170	
1958	Sam Jones	225	St. Louis Cardinals	Warren Spahn^{†}	150	
1959	Don Drysdale^{†}	242	Los Angeles Dodgers	Sam Jones	209	
1960	Don Drysdale^{†}	246	Los Angeles Dodgers	Sandy Koufax^{†}	197	
1961	Sandy Koufax^{†}	269	Los Angeles Dodgers	Stan Williams	205	
1962	Don Drysdale^{†}	232	Los Angeles Dodgers	Sandy Koufax^{†}	219	
1963	Sandy Koufax^{†}	306	Los Angeles Dodgers	Jim Maloney	265	
1964	Bob Veale	250	Pittsburgh Pirates	Bob Gibson^{†}	245	
1965	Sandy Koufax^{†}	382	Los Angeles Dodgers	Bob Veale	276	
1966	Sandy Koufax^{†}	317	Los Angeles Dodgers	Jim Bunning^{†}	252	
1967	Jim Bunning^{†}	253	Philadelphia Phillies	Ferguson Jenkins^{†}	236	
1968	Bob Gibson^{†}	268	St. Louis Cardinals	Ferguson Jenkins^{†}	260	
1969	Ferguson Jenkins^{†}	273	Chicago Cubs	Bob Gibson^{†}	269	
1970	Tom Seaver^{†}	283	New York Mets	Bob Gibson^{†} Ferguson Jenkins^{†}	274	
1971	Tom Seaver^{†}	289	New York Mets	Ferguson Jenkins^{†}	263	
1972	Steve Carlton^{†}	310	Philadelphia Phillies	Tom Seaver^{†}	249	
1973	Tom Seaver^{†}	251	New York Mets	Steve Carlton^{†}	223	
1974	Steve Carlton^{†}	240	Philadelphia Phillies	Andy Messersmith	221	
1975	Tom Seaver^{†}	243	New York Mets	John Montefusco	215	
1976	Tom Seaver^{†}	235	New York Mets	J. R. Richard	214	
1977	Phil Niekro^{†}	262	Atlanta Braves	J. R. Richard	214	
1978	J. R. Richard	303	Houston Astros	Phil Niekro^{†}	248	
1979	J. R. Richard	313	Houston Astros	Steve Carlton^{†}	213	
1980	Steve Carlton^{†}	286	Philadelphia Phillies	Nolan Ryan^{†}	200	
1981	Fernando Valenzuela	180	Los Angeles Dodgers	Steve Carlton^{†}	179	
1982	Steve Carlton^{†}	286	Philadelphia Phillies	Mario Soto	274	
1983	Steve Carlton^{†}	275	Philadelphia Phillies	Mario Soto	242	
1984	Dwight Gooden	276	New York Mets	Fernando Valenzuela	240	
1985	Dwight Gooden	268	New York Mets	Mario Soto	214	
1986	Mike Scott	306	Houston Astros	Fernando Valenzuela	242	
1987	Nolan Ryan^{†}	270	Houston Astros	Mike Scott	233	
1988	Nolan Ryan^{†}	228	Houston Astros	David Cone	213	
1989	José DeLeón	201	St. Louis Cardinals	Tim Belcher	200	
1990	David Cone	233	New York Mets	Dwight Gooden; Ramón Martínez	223	
1991	David Cone	241	New York Mets	Greg Maddux^{†}	198	
1992	John Smoltz^{†}	215	Atlanta Braves	David Cone	214	
1993	José Rijo	227	Cincinnati Reds	John Smoltz^{†}	208	
1994	Andy Benes	189	San Diego Padres	José Rijo	171	
1995	Hideo Nomo	236	Los Angeles Dodgers	John Smoltz^{†}	193	
1996	John Smoltz^{†}	276	Atlanta Braves	Hideo Nomo	234	
1997	Curt Schilling	319	Philadelphia Phillies	Pedro Martínez^{†}	305	
1998	Curt Schilling	300	Philadelphia Phillies	Kevin Brown	257	
1999	Randy Johnson^{†}	364	Arizona Diamondbacks	Kevin Brown	221	
2000	Randy Johnson^{†}	347	Arizona Diamondbacks	Chan Ho Park	217	
2001	Randy Johnson^{†}	372	Arizona Diamondbacks	Curt Schilling	293	
2002	Randy Johnson^{†}	334	Arizona Diamondbacks	Curt Schilling	316	
2003	Kerry Wood	266	Chicago Cubs	Mark Prior	245	
2004	Randy Johnson^{†}	290	Arizona Diamondbacks	Ben Sheets	264	
2005	Jake Peavy	216	San Diego Padres	Chris Carpenter	213	
2006	Aaron Harang	216	Cincinnati Reds	Jake Peavy	215	
2007	Jake Peavy	240	San Diego Padres	Aaron Harang	218	
2008	Tim Lincecum	265	San Francisco Giants	Dan Haren; Johan Santana; Edinson Vólquez	206	
2009	Tim Lincecum	261	San Francisco Giants	Javier Vázquez	238	
2010	Tim Lincecum	231	San Francisco Giants	Roy Halladay^{†}	219	
2011	Clayton Kershaw	248	Los Angeles Dodgers	Cliff Lee	238	
2012	R. A. Dickey	230	New York Mets	Clayton Kershaw	229	
2013	Clayton Kershaw	232	Los Angeles Dodgers	Cliff Lee	222	
2014	Johnny Cueto; Stephen Strasburg	242	Cincinnati Reds; Washington Nationals	Clayton Kershaw	239	
2015	Clayton Kershaw	301	Los Angeles Dodgers	Max Scherzer	276	
2016	Max Scherzer	284	Washington Nationals	José Fernández	253	
2017	Max Scherzer	268	Washington Nationals	Jacob deGrom	239	
2018	Max Scherzer	300	Washington Nationals	Jacob deGrom	269	
2019	Jacob deGrom	255	New York Mets	Stephen Strasburg	251	
2020	Jacob deGrom	104	New York Mets	Trevor Bauer	100	
2021	Zack Wheeler	247	Philadelphia Phillies	Max Scherzer	236	
2022	Corbin Burnes	238	Milwaukee Brewers	Carlos Rodon	237	
2023	Spencer Strider	281	Atlanta Braves	Blake Snell	234	
2024	Chris Sale	225	Atlanta Braves	Dylan Cease; Zack Wheeler	224	
2025	Logan Webb	224	San Francisco Giants	Jesús Luzardo; Paul Skenes	216	
2026	Jacob Misiorowski	252	Milwaukee Brewers	Cristopher Sánchez	221	

== American League ==
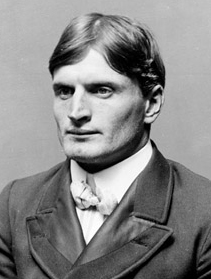
Rube Waddell led the American League in strikeouts for six consecutive seasons (1902–1907).

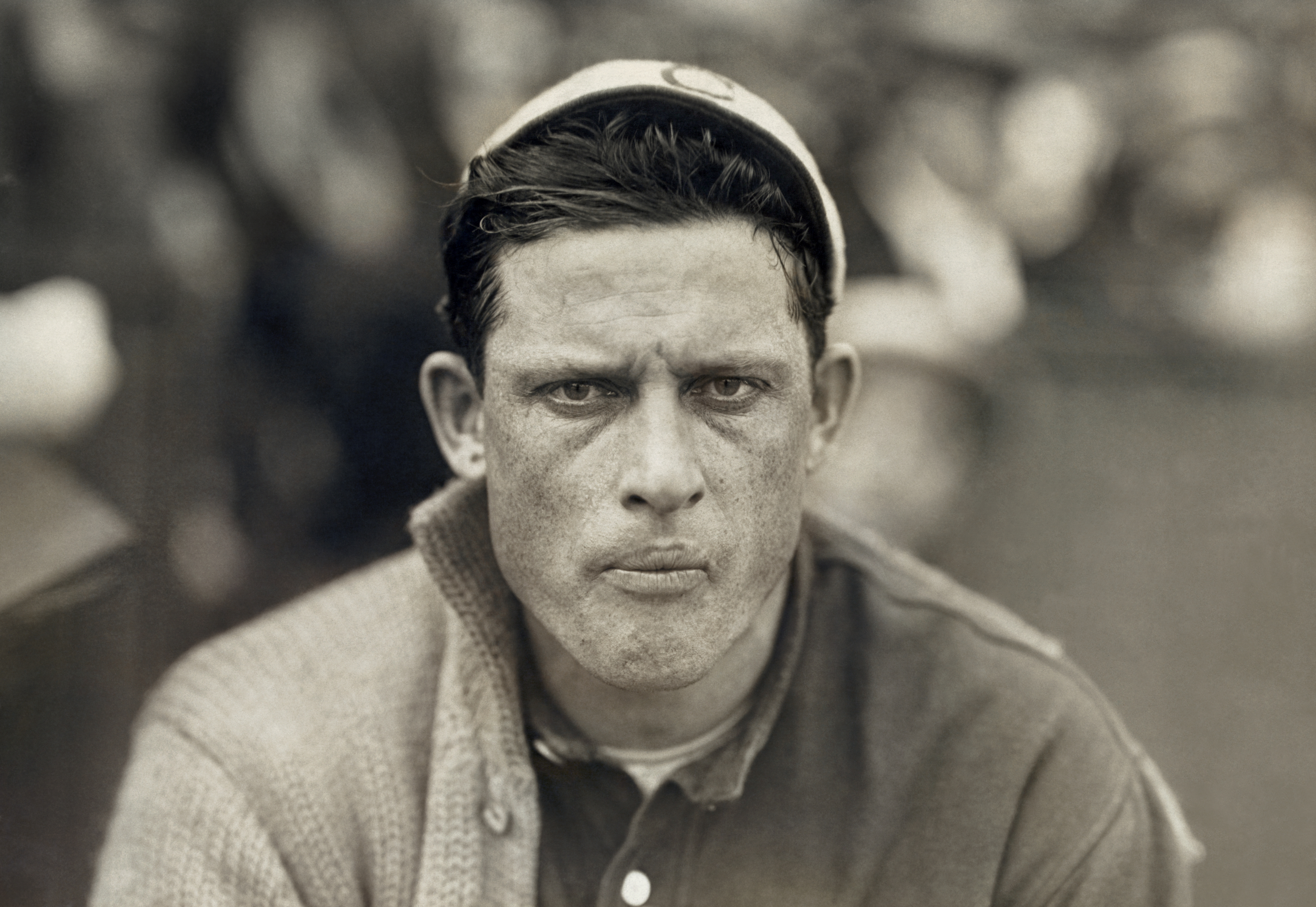
In 1908 and 1911, Ed Walsh was the American League strikeout champion.

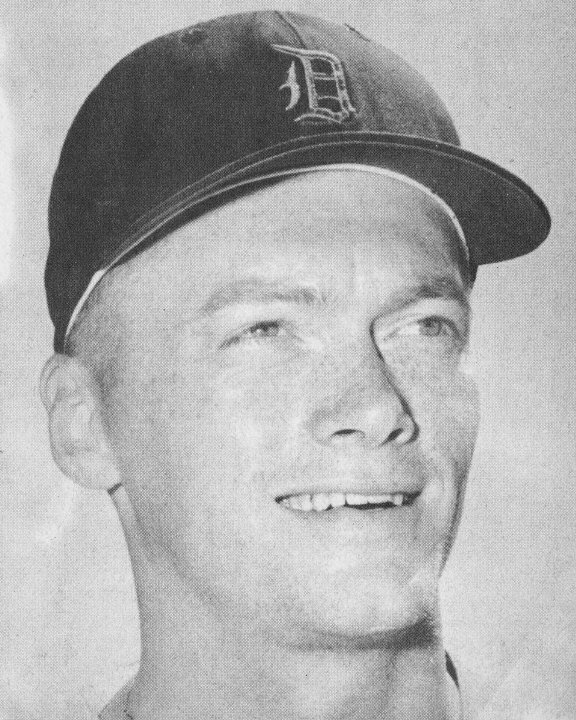
In 1959 and 1960, Jim Bunning led the American League in strikeouts; he finished in second place four times.

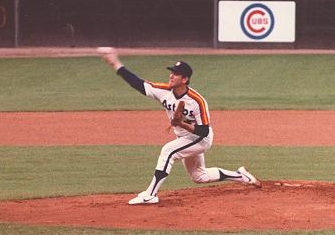
Nolan Ryan has 5,714 career strikeouts, the most in Major League history. His 11 seasons as a strikeout leader – second only to the 12 of Walter Johnson – includes nine seasons, between 1972 and 1990, as the American League strikeout leader.

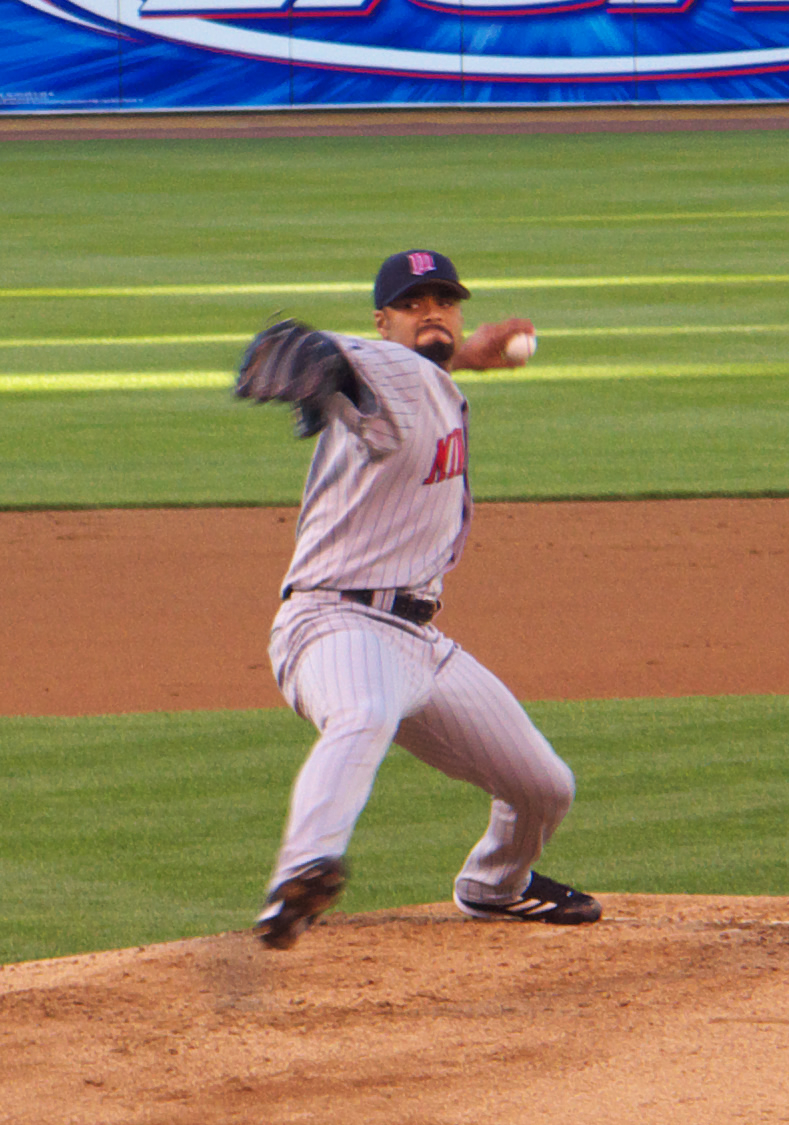
Three-time strikeout champion Johan Santana won the American League's last pitching triple crown in 2006.

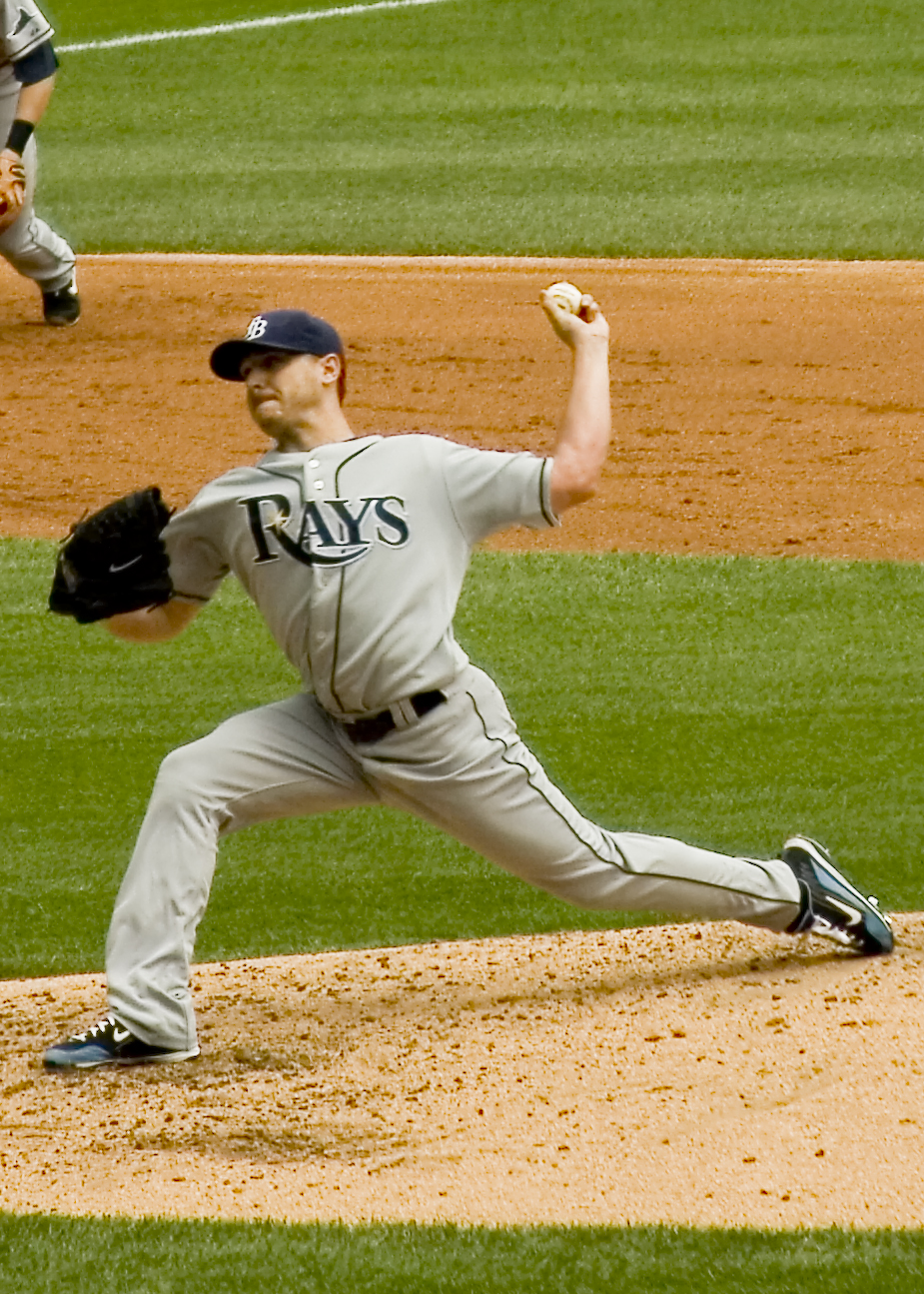
Scott Kazmir's 239 strikeouts led the American League in 2007.

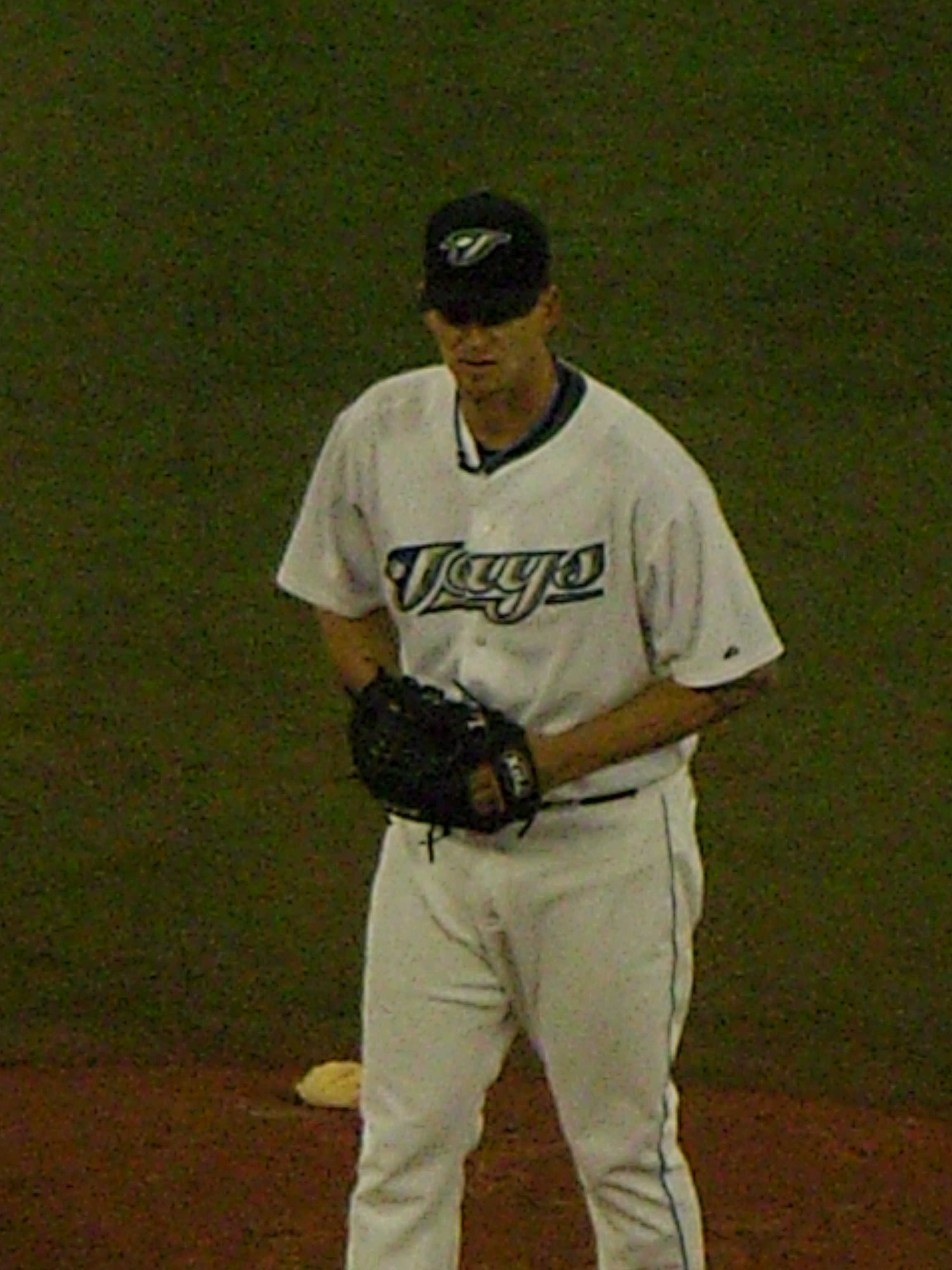
A. J. Burnett won the American League strikeout title in 2008.

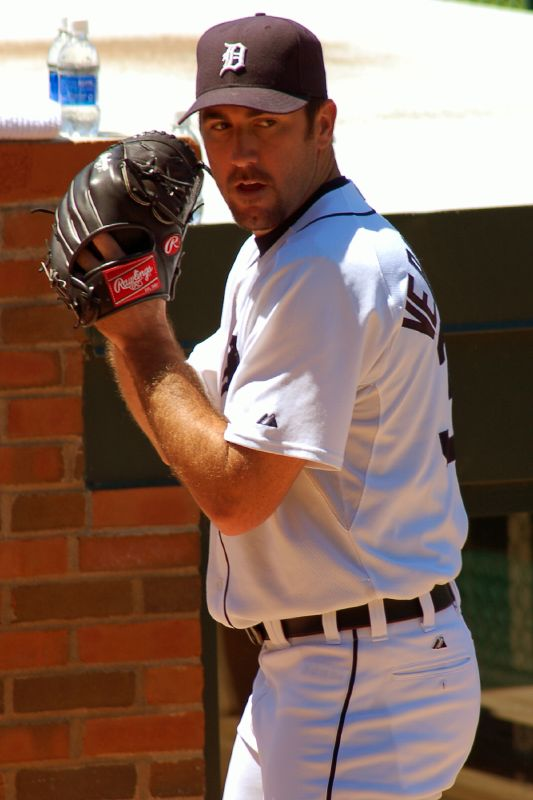
Justin Verlander also led the American League in wins and innings pitched in 2009.

Year	Leader	K	Team	Runner-up	K	Ref
1901	Cy Young^{†}	158	Boston Americans	Roy Patterson	127	
1902	Rube Waddell^{†}	210	Philadelphia Athletics	Cy Young^{†}	160	
1903	Rube Waddell^{†}	302	Philadelphia Athletics	Bill Donovan	187	
1904	Rube Waddell^{†}	349	Philadelphia Athletics	Jack Chesbro^{†}	239	
1905	Rube Waddell^{†}	287	Philadelphia Athletics	Eddie Plank^{†} Cy Young^{†}	210	
1906	Rube Waddell^{†}	196	Philadelphia Athletics	Cy Falkenberg	178	
1907	Rube Waddell^{†}	232	Philadelphia Athletics	Ed Walsh^{†}	206	
1908	Ed Walsh^{†}	269	Chicago White Sox	Rube Waddell^{†}	232	
1909	Frank Smith	177	Chicago White Sox	Walter Johnson^{†}	164	
1910	Walter Johnson^{†}	313	Washington Senators	Ed Walsh^{†}	258	
1911	Ed Walsh^{†}	255	Chicago White Sox	Joe Wood	231	
1912	Walter Johnson^{†}	303	Washington Senators	Joe Wood	258	
1913	Walter Johnson^{†}	243	Washington Senators	Cy Falkenberg; Vean Gregg	166	
1914	Walter Johnson^{†}	225	Washington Senators	Willie Mitchell	179	
1915	Walter Johnson^{†}	203	Washington Senators	Red Faber^{†}	182	
1916	Walter Johnson^{†}	228	Washington Senators	Elmer Myers	182	
1917	Walter Johnson^{†}	188	Washington Senators	Eddie Cicotte	150	
1918	Walter Johnson^{†}	162	Washington Senators	Jim Shaw	129	
1919	Walter Johnson^{†}	147	Washington Senators	Jim Shaw	128	
1920	Stan Coveleski^{†}	133	Cleveland Indians	Lefty Williams	128	
1921	Walter Johnson^{†}	143	Washington Senators	Urban Shocker	132	
1922	Urban Shocker	149	St. Louis Browns	Red Faber^{†}	148	
1923	Walter Johnson^{†}	130	Washington Senators	Joe Bush; Bob Shawkey	125	
1924	Walter Johnson^{†}	158	Washington Senators	Howard Ehmke	119	
1925	Lefty Grove^{†}	116	Philadelphia Athletics	Walter Johnson^{†}	108	
1926	Lefty Grove^{†}	194	Philadelphia Athletics	George Uhle	159	
1927	Lefty Grove^{†}	174	Philadelphia Athletics	Rube Walberg	136	
1928	Lefty Grove^{†}	183	Philadelphia Athletics	George Pipgras	139	
1929	Lefty Grove^{†}	170	Philadelphia Athletics	George Earnshaw	149	
1930	Lefty Grove^{†}	209	Philadelphia Athletics	George Earnshaw	193	
1931	Lefty Grove^{†}	175	Philadelphia Athletics	George Earnshaw	152	
1932	Red Ruffing^{†}	190	New York Yankees	Lefty Grove^{†}	188	
1933	Lefty Gomez^{†}	163	New York Yankees	Bump Hadley	149	
1934	Lefty Gomez^{†}	158	New York Yankees	Tommy Bridges	151	
1935	Tommy Bridges	163	Detroit Tigers	Schoolboy Rowe	140	
1936	Tommy Bridges	175	Detroit Tigers	Johnny Allen	165	
1937	Lefty Gomez^{†}	194	New York Yankees	Bobo Newsom	166	
1938	Bob Feller^{†}	240	Cleveland Indians	Bobo Newsom	226	
1939	Bob Feller^{†}	246	Cleveland Indians	Bobo Newsom	192	
1940	Bob Feller^{†}	261	Cleveland Indians	Bobo Newsom	164	
1941	Bob Feller^{†}	260	Cleveland Indians	Bobo Newsom	175	
1942	Tex Hughson; Bobo Newsom	113	Boston Red Sox; Washington Senators	Al Benton; Phil Marchildon	110	
1943	Allie Reynolds	151	Cleveland Indians	Hal Newhouser^{†}	144	
1944	Hal Newhouser^{†}	187	Detroit Tigers	Dizzy Trout	144	
1945	Hal Newhouser^{†}	212	Detroit Tigers	Nels Potter	129	
1946	Bob Feller^{†}	348	Cleveland Indians	Hal Newhouser^{†}	275	
1947	Bob Feller^{†}	196	Cleveland Indians	Hal Newhouser^{†}	176	
1948	Bob Feller^{†}	164	Cleveland Indians	Bob Lemon^{†}	147	
1949	Virgil Trucks	153	Detroit Tigers	Hal Newhouser^{†}	144	
1950	Bob Lemon^{†}	170	Cleveland Indians	Allie Reynolds	160	
1951	Vic Raschi	164	New York Yankees	Early Wynn^{†}	133	
1952	Allie Reynolds	160	New York Yankees	Early Wynn^{†}	153	
1953	Billy Pierce	186	Chicago White Sox	Virgil Trucks	149	
1954	Bob Turley	185	Baltimore Orioles	Early Wynn^{†}	155	
1955	Herb Score	245	Cleveland Indians	Bob Turley	210	
1956	Herb Score	263	Cleveland Indians	Billy Pierce	192	
1957	Early Wynn^{†}	184	Cleveland Indians	Jim Bunning^{†}	182	
1958	Early Wynn^{†}	179	Chicago White Sox	Jim Bunning^{†}	177	
1959	Jim Bunning^{†}	201	Detroit Tigers	Camilo Pascual	185	
1960	Jim Bunning^{†}	201	Detroit Tigers	Pedro Ramos	160	
1961	Camilo Pascual	221	Minnesota Twins	Whitey Ford^{†}	209	
1962	Camilo Pascual	206	Minnesota Twins	Jim Bunning^{†}	184	
1963	Camilo Pascual	202	Minnesota Twins	Jim Bunning^{†}	196	
1964	Al Downing	217	New York Yankees	Camilo Pascual	213	
1965	Sam McDowell	325	Cleveland Indians	Mickey Lolich	226	
1966	Sam McDowell	225	Cleveland Indians	Jim Kaat^{†}	205	
1967	Jim Lonborg	246	Boston Red Sox	Sam McDowell	236	
1968	Sam McDowell	283	Cleveland Indians	Denny McLain	280	
1969	Sam McDowell	279	Cleveland Indians	Mickey Lolich	271	
1970	Sam McDowell	304	Cleveland Indians	Mickey Lolich	230	
1971	Mickey Lolich	308	Detroit Tigers	Vida Blue	301	
1972	Nolan Ryan^{†}	329	California Angels	Mickey Lolich	250	
1973	Nolan Ryan^{†}	383	California Angels	Bert Blyleven^{†}	258	
1974	Nolan Ryan^{†}	367	California Angels	Bert Blyleven^{†}	249	
1975	Frank Tanana	269	California Angels	Bert Blyleven^{†} Gaylord Perry^{†}	233	
1976	Nolan Ryan^{†}	327	California Angels	Frank Tanana	261	
1977	Nolan Ryan^{†}	341	California Angels	Dennis Leonard	244	
1978	Nolan Ryan^{†}	260	California Angels	Ron Guidry	248	
1979	Nolan Ryan^{†}	223	California Angels	Ron Guidry	201	
1980	Len Barker	187	Cleveland Indians	Mike Norris	180	
1981	Len Barker	127	Cleveland Indians	Britt Burns	108	
1982	Floyd Bannister	209	Seattle Mariners	Len Barker	187	
1983	Jack Morris^{†}	232	Detroit Tigers	Floyd Bannister	193	
1984	Mark Langston	204	Seattle Mariners	Dave Stieb	198	
1985	Bert Blyleven^{†}	206	Cleveland Indians; Minnesota Twins	Floyd Bannister	198	
1986	Mark Langston	245	Seattle Mariners	Roger Clemens	238	
1987	Mark Langston	262	Seattle Mariners	Roger Clemens	256	
1988	Roger Clemens	291	Boston Red Sox	Mark Langston	235	
1989	Nolan Ryan^{†}	301	Texas Rangers	Roger Clemens	230	
1990	Nolan Ryan^{†}	232	Texas Rangers	Bobby Witt	221	
1991	Roger Clemens	241	Boston Red Sox	Randy Johnson^{†}	228	
1992	Randy Johnson^{†}	241	Seattle Mariners	Mélido Pérez	218	
1993	Randy Johnson^{†}	308	Seattle Mariners	Mark Langston	196	
1994	Randy Johnson^{†}	204	Seattle Mariners	Roger Clemens	168	
1995	Randy Johnson^{†}	294	Seattle Mariners	Todd Stottlemyre	205	
1996	Roger Clemens	257	Boston Red Sox	Chuck Finley	215	
1997	Roger Clemens	292	Toronto Blue Jays	Randy Johnson^{†}	291	
1998	Roger Clemens	271	Toronto Blue Jays	Pedro Martínez^{†}	251	
1999	Pedro Martínez^{†}	313	Boston Red Sox	Chuck Finley	200	
2000	Pedro Martínez^{†}	284	Boston Red Sox	Bartolo Colón	212	
2001	Hideo Nomo	220	Boston Red Sox	Mike Mussina^{†}	214	
2002	Pedro Martínez^{†}	239	Boston Red Sox	Roger Clemens	192	
2003	Esteban Loaiza	207	Chicago White Sox	Pedro Martínez^{†}	206	
2004	Johan Santana	265	Minnesota Twins	Pedro Martínez^{†}	227	
2005	Johan Santana	238	Minnesota Twins	Randy Johnson^{†}	211	
2006	Johan Santana	245	Minnesota Twins	Jeremy Bonderman	202	
2007	Scott Kazmir	239	Tampa Bay Devil Rays	Johan Santana	235	
2008	A. J. Burnett	231	Toronto Blue Jays	Ervin Santana	214	
2009	Justin Verlander	269	Detroit Tigers	Zack Greinke	242	
2010	Jered Weaver	233	Los Angeles Angels of Anaheim	Félix Hernández	232	
2011	Justin Verlander	250	Detroit Tigers	CC Sabathia^{†}	230	
2012	Justin Verlander	239	Detroit Tigers	Max Scherzer	231	
2013	Yu Darvish	277	Texas Rangers	Max Scherzer	240	
2014	David Price	271	Tampa Bay Rays; Detroit Tigers	Corey Kluber	269	
2015	Chris Sale	274	Chicago White Sox	Chris Archer	252	
2016	Justin Verlander	254	Detroit Tigers	Chris Archer; Chris Sale	233	
2017	Chris Sale	308	Boston Red Sox	Corey Kluber	265	
2018	Justin Verlander	290	Houston Astros	Gerrit Cole	276	
2019	Gerrit Cole	326	Houston Astros	Justin Verlander	300	
2020	Shane Bieber	122	Cleveland Indians	Lucas Giolito	97	
2021	Robbie Ray	248	Toronto Blue Jays	Gerrit Cole	243	
2022	Gerrit Cole	257	New York Yankees	Dylan Cease	227	
2023	Kevin Gausman	237	Toronto Blue Jays	Pablo López	234	
2024	Tarik Skubal	228	Detroit Tigers	Cole Ragans	223	
2025	Garrett Crochet	255	Boston Red Sox	Tarik Skubal	241	
2026	Gavin Williams	248	Cleveland Guardians	Dylan Cease; Cam Schlittler	239	

== Other major leagues ==
Matt Kilroy's 513 strikeouts in 1886 is the most in a single season by a pitcher among modern recognized major leagues.

Year	Leader	K	Team	League	Runner-up	K	Ref
1882	Tony Mullane	170	Louisville Eclipse	American Association	Harry Salisbury	135	
1883	Tim Keefe^{†}	359	New York Metropolitans	American Association	Bobby Mathews	203	
1884	Guy Hecker	385	Louisville Eclipse	American Association	Hardie Henderson	346	
1884	Hugh Daily	483	Chicago Browns; Washington Nationals	Union Association	Bill Sweeney	374	
1885	Ed Morris	298	Pittsburgh Alleghenys	American Association	Bobby Mathews	286	
1886	Matt Kilroy	513	Baltimore Orioles	American Association	Toad Ramsey	499	
1887	Toad Ramsey	355	Louisville Eclipse	American Association	Matt Kilroy	217	
1888	Ed Seward	272	Philadelphia Athletics	American Association	Silver King	258	
1889	Mark Baldwin	368	Columbus Solons	American Association	Matt Kilroy	217	
1890	Sadie McMahon	291	Philadelphia Athletics; Baltimore Orioles	American Association	Jack Stivetts	289	
1890	Mark Baldwin	206	Chicago Pirates	Players' League	Silver King	185	
1891	Jack Stivetts	259	St. Louis Browns	American Association	Phil Knell	228	
1914	Cy Falkenberg	236	Indianapolis Hoosiers	Federal League	Earl Moseley	205	
1915	Dave Davenport	229	St. Louis Terriers	Federal League	Al Schulz	160	

== Negro Major Leagues ==
=== Negro National League I ===
Year	Leader	K	Team	Runner-up	K	Ref
1920	Sam Crawford	106	Kansas City Monarchs	José Leblanc	103	
1921	Bill Holland	140	Kansas City Monarchs	Bill Drake	136	
1922	Bill Force	120	Detroit Stars	Bullet Rogan^{†}	118	
1923	Bullet Rogan^{†}	151	Kansas City Monarchs	Rube Curry	119	
1924	Sam Streeter	128	Birmingham Black Barons	Robert Poindexter	121	
1925	Bullet Rogan^{†}	96	Kansas City Monarchs	Steel Arm Tyler	93	
1926	Logan Hensley	122	St. Louis Stars	Bill Foster^{†}	111	
1927	Ted Trent	133	St. Louis Stars	Bill Foster^{†}	119	
1928	Satchel Paige^{†}	121	Birmingham Black Barons	Bill Foster^{†}	119	
1929	Satchel Paige^{†}	189	Birmingham Black Barons	Andy Cooper^{†}	104	
1930	Bill Foster^{†}	133	Chicago American Giants	Army Cooper	104	
1931	Ray Brown^{†}	79	Indianapolis ABCs	Willie Powell	56	

=== Eastern Colored League ===
Year	Leader	K	Team	Runner-up	K	Ref
1923	Rats Henderson	100	Atlantic City Bacharach Giants	Nip Winters	95	
1924	Nip Winters	114	Hilldale Club	Dave Brown	107	
1925	Rats Henderson	125	Atlantic City Bacharach Giants	Claude Grier	103	
1926	Claude Grier	141	Atlantic City Bacharach Giants	Rats Henderson	100	
1927	Luther Farrell	138	Atlantic City Bacharach Giants	Phil Cockrell	78	
1928	Laymon Yokely	103	Baltimore Black Sox	Luther Farrell	87	

=== American Negro League ===
Year	Leader	K	Team	Runner-up	K	Ref
1929	Laymon Yokely	97	Baltimore Black Sox	Smokey Joe Williams^{†}	85	

=== East–West League ===
Year	Leader	K	Team	Runner-up	K	Ref
1932	Bertrum Hunter	72	Detroit Wolves / Homestead Grays	Lefty Holmes	68	

=== Negro Southern League ===
Year	Leader	K	Team	Runner-up	K	Ref
1932	Barney Morris	81	Monroe Monarchs	Bill Foster^{†}	76	

=== Negro National League II ===
Year	Leader	K	Team	Runner-up	K	Ref
1933	Leroy Matlock	100	Pittsburgh Crawfords	Bertrum Hunter	80	
1934	Slim Jones	164	Pittsburgh Crawfords	Satchel Paige^{†}	152	
1935	Luis Tiant Sr.	64	New York Cubans	Leon Day^{†}	62	
1936	Satchel Paige^{†}	72	Pittsburgh Crawfords	Neck Stanley	62	
1937	Ray Brown^{†}	74	Homestead Grays	Barney Morris	54	
1938	Ray Brown^{†}	70	Homestead Grays	Henry McHenry	61	
1939	Neck Stanley	44	New York Black Yankees	Jim Missouri	43	
1940	Henry McHenry	86	Philadelphia Stars	Edsall Walker	81	
1941	Dave Barnhill	109	New York Cubans	Terris McDuffie	82	
1942	Leon Day^{†}	86	Homestead Grays / Newark Eagles	Barney Brown	77	
1943	Bill Byrd; Johnny Wright	94	Baltimore Elite Giants / Philadelphia Stars; Homestead Grays	Dave Barnhill	87	
1944	Bill Ricks	103	Philadelphia Stars	Bill Byrd	58	
1945	Bill Byrd	91	Baltimore Elite Giants	Roy Partlow	80	
1946	Leon Day^{†}	109	Newark Eagles	Henry McHenry	90	
1947	Bob Romby	99	Baltimore Elite Giants	Rufus Lewis	81	
1948	Joe Black	85	Baltimore Elite Giants	Bill Byrd	79	

=== Negro American League ===
Year	Leader	K	Team	Runner-up	K	Ref
1937	Hilton Smith^{†}	99	Chicago American Giants / Kansas City Monarchs	Jesse Houston	84	
1938	Hilton Smith^{†}	88	Kansas City Monarchs	Willie Cornelius	77	
1939	Hilton Smith^{†}	85	Kansas City Monarchs	George Walker	63	
1940	Preacher Henry	63	Cleveland Bears	Hilton Smith^{†}	57	
1941	Hilton Smith^{†}	57	Kansas City Monarchs	Satchel Paige^{†}	48	
1942	Satchel Paige^{†}	56	Kansas City Monarchs	Hilton Smith^{†}	42	
1943	Satchel Paige^{†}	102	Kansas City Monarchs / Memphis Red Sox	Alvin Gipson	62	
1944	Satchel Paige^{†}	105	Kansas City Monarchs	Verdell Mathis	56	
1945	Booker McDaniel	117	Kansas City Monarchs	Jim LaMarque	71	
1946	Connie Johnson	63	Kansas City Monarchs	Walter McCoy	43	
1947	Jim LaMarque	85	Kansas City Monarchs	Ted Alexander; Dan Bankhead	34	
1948	Jim LaMarque	80	Kansas City Monarchs	Gene Collins	62	

== Footnotes ==
- ^{a} Recognized "major leagues" include the current American and National Leagues and several defunct leagues—the American Association, the Federal League, the Players' League, and the Union Association. In addition, seven different Negro league baseball leagues are recognized by Major League Baseball as major leagues: the Negro National League I (1920–1931), Eastern Colored League (1923–1928), American Negro League (1929), East–West League (1932), Negro Southern League (1932), Negro National League II (1933–1948), and the Negro American League (1937–1948).
- ^{b} In baseball scorekeeping, "K" is the traditional notation for the strikeout.
- ^{c} In 1939, Claude Passeau played the entire season for the Cincinnati Reds, while co-leader Bucky Walters was traded from the Philadelphia Phillies to the Chicago Cubs mid-season.
