= Amos Rusie =

American baseball player (1871–1942)

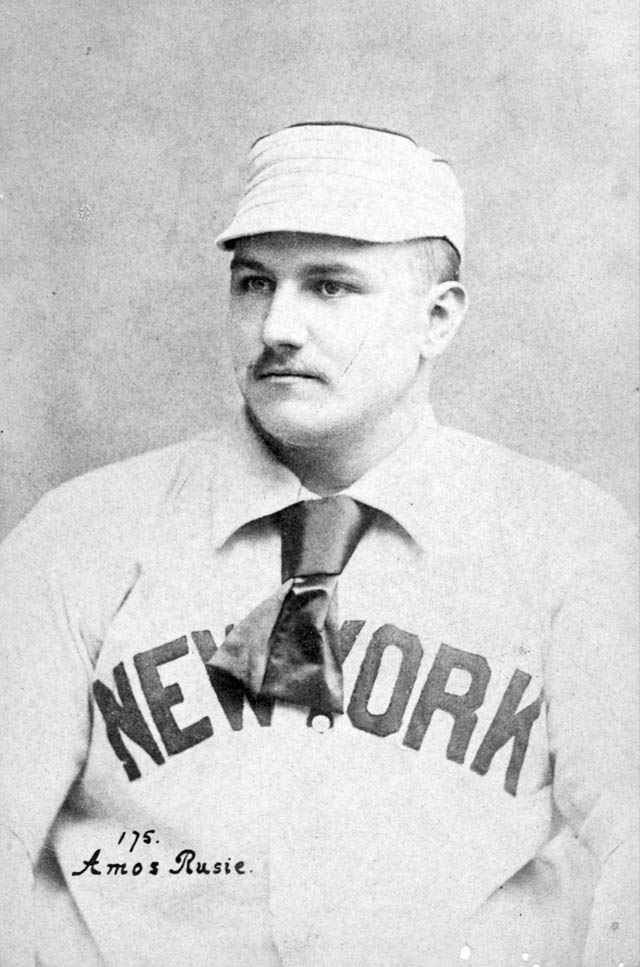
- Rusie c. 1890
- Pitcher
- Born: May 30, 1871; Mooresville, Indiana, U.S.
- Died: December 6, 1942 (aged 71); Seattle, Washington, U.S.
- Batted: Right Threw: Right

MLB debut
- May 9, 1889, for the Indianapolis Hoosiers

Last MLB appearance
- June 9, 1901, for the Cincinnati Reds

MLB statistics
- Win–loss record: 245–174
- Earned run average: 3.07
- Strikeouts: 1,934
- Stats at Baseball Reference

Teams
- Indianapolis Hoosiers (1889); New York Giants (1890–1898); Cincinnati Reds (1901)

Career highlights and awards
- Triple Crown (1894); NL wins leader (1894); 2× NL ERA leader (1894, 1897); 5× NL strikeout leader (1890–1891, 1893–1895); Pitched a no-hitter on July 31, 1891

Member of the National

Baseball Hall of Fame
- Induction: 1977
- Election method: Veterans Committee

Amos Wilson Rusie (May 30, 1871 – December 6, 1942), nicknamed "the Hoosier Thunderbolt", was an American right-handed pitcher in Major League Baseball during the late 19th century. He had a 10-season career in the National League (NL), which consisted of one season with the Indianapolis Hoosiers in 1889, eight with the New York Giants from 1890 to 1898, and one with the Cincinnati Reds in 1901.

He is best known for the speed at which he pitched. The velocity of his fastball was unknown, but it has been estimated that he threw it in the mid-to-upper 90s. He led the league in strikeouts five times, and won 20 or more games eight times. Though he did throw hard, he did not have good control of his pitches, leading the league in walks five times and being seventh all-time among the career pitching leaders in that category. In 1890 he walked 289, the all-time single-season record.

In 1897, one of his fastballs struck future Hall of Fame shortstop Hughie Jennings in the head, rendering him comatose for four days before recovery. Rusie's wildness had been a catalyst for officials to change the distance from the pitching rubber (the back line of the pitching box at the time) to home plate from 55 feet 6 inches (16.92 m) to the current 60 feet 6 inches (18.44 m). This ruling was made effective for the 1893 season, at the peak of Amos Rusie's pitching prowess. The distance change did not reduce Rusie's effectiveness, as he led the league in strikeouts for three straight seasons afterward, while also winning what later would be known as the pitching triple crown in 1894. For his accomplishments, he was inducted into the Baseball Hall of Fame in 1977 by the Veterans Committee.

== Early life ==
Rusie was born on May 30, 1871, in Mooresville, Indiana, to mason and plasterer William Asbury Rusie and his wife Mary Donovan. When he was still young, his family moved to nearby Indianapolis, Indiana, where he eventually quit school to work in a factory. It was during this time, when he was playing for a semi-professional Indianapolis baseball team named the "Sturm Avenue Never Sweats", that scouts first took notice of the speed with which he threw, and his effectiveness as a pitcher when he shutout touring National League baseball teams, the Boston Beaneaters and the Washington Senators.

In 1889, at the age of 18, Rusie signed with the Burlington Babies of the Central Interstate League. However, he was signed shortly thereafter by the Indianapolis Hoosiers of the NL, and made his major league debut on May 9 in a 13-2 loss to the Cleveland Blues, pitching in relief of starting pitcher Jim Whitney. In 33 games pitched during the 1889 season, he posted a 12–10 win–loss record, he started 22, completed 19, and recorded one shutout. Although his fastball was difficult to hit, he did not have good control of it, walking 116 batters in 225 innings pitched, although he struck out 109 and led the league with 11 games finished (as a relief pitcher).

== New York Giants ==
=== 1890–1892 ===
The Hoosiers disbanded at the conclusion of the 1889 season, and on March 22, 1890, he, along with many of his teammates, were transferred to the New York Giants by the league to strengthen the NL's largest market. Coming into the 1890 season, Rusie filled the starting position that was vacated by future Hall of Famer Tim Keefe, who had joined the New York Giants of the newly formed Players' League (PL). Instead of evenly splitting pitching duties with Mickey Welch, another future Hall of Fame player, as Keefe had done the preceding five seasons, he started 62 games to Welch's 37.

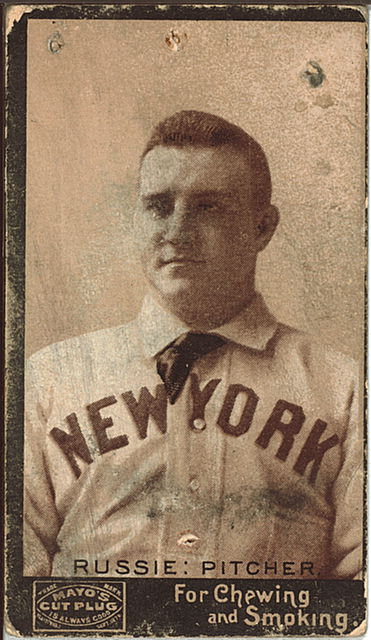
An 1895 tobacco card of Amos Rusie

Rusie quickly became a sensation among fans, media, and society owing to the combination of his pitching velocity and physical size at 6-foot-1-inch (1.85 m), 200-pound (91 kg), which was considered large for the era. The fans began calling him the "Hoosier Thunderbolt", while famed vaudeville act Weber and Fields used his name, a paperback book, Secrets of Amos Rusie, The World's Greatest Pitcher, How He Obtained His Incredible Speed on Balls, was available for a quarter, a drink was named after him, and he received a message from the popular performer Lillian Russell.

On May 9, the Giants defeated the Boston Beaneaters by a score of 16–3, doing so by committing no errors, very rare for the era, and with Rusie allowing just 6 hits. Three days later, on May 12, Rusie was on the winning side of a pitching duel with future Hall of Famer Kid Nichols, in a game that ended with a home run by the Giants' Mike Tiernan in the 13th inning. The home run was described as a "tape measure" hit, sailing over the outfield fence and landing in an adjacent baseball field, Brotherhood Park, where a PL game was being played at the same time, causing fans of both parks to cheer.

Rusie completed the season with 67 games pitched, 62 games started, 56 complete games, four shutouts, 548.2 innings pitched, 2.56 earned run average (ERA), and a league-leading total of 341 strikeouts, the highest seasonal total he would have in his career. Due to the lack of control of his pitches, however, he also led the league with 289 walks, the all-time record for a season, and tossed 36 wild pitches, another total that topped the league. The Giants finished in sixth place among the eight NL teams, while Rusie won 29 games and had a league-leading 34 losses. As a hitter, he had a successful season with .278 batting average in 284 at bats, 13 doubles, six triples, and he scored 31 runs. Rusie married May Smith in Muncie, Indiana on November 8, 1890, in the Delaware County Clerk's Office.

After the demise of the PL following the 1890 season, the Giants absorbed many of the players who had been on the crosstown rival's roster. Future Hall of Famers Roger Connor, Jim O'Rourke, Buck Ewing, and Tim Keefe simply returned to the team, as well as George Gore, while John Ewing, and Danny Richardson were new signings, solidifying both a powerful hitting line-up and a solid pitching rotation for the 1891 season. While the upgraded Giants improved their final standings by finishing in third place among eight teams in the NL, and had a four-game lead over the Chicago Colts on June 16 when Rusie held them scoreless, and were 2.5 games behind the Colts on September 19, they were 13 games back at the close of the season.

After having been on the losing end of no-hitter by Tom Lovett of the Brooklyn Bridegrooms on June 22, Rusie returned the favor by throwing one of his own against them just over a month later on July 31. After winning both games of a doubleheader against the Bridegrooms in September, Rusie and several other star players were rested for the remainder of the season, a five-game series against the Boston Beaneaters. Rusie's 337 strikeouts and 262 bases on balls led the league for the second consecutive year, and his six shutouts marked the first time he led the league in that category. His record improved to 33–20, and he followed that up in 1892 with a record of 32–31, 304 strikeouts (second-best to Bill Hutchison) and 270 walks.

=== 1893–1898 ===
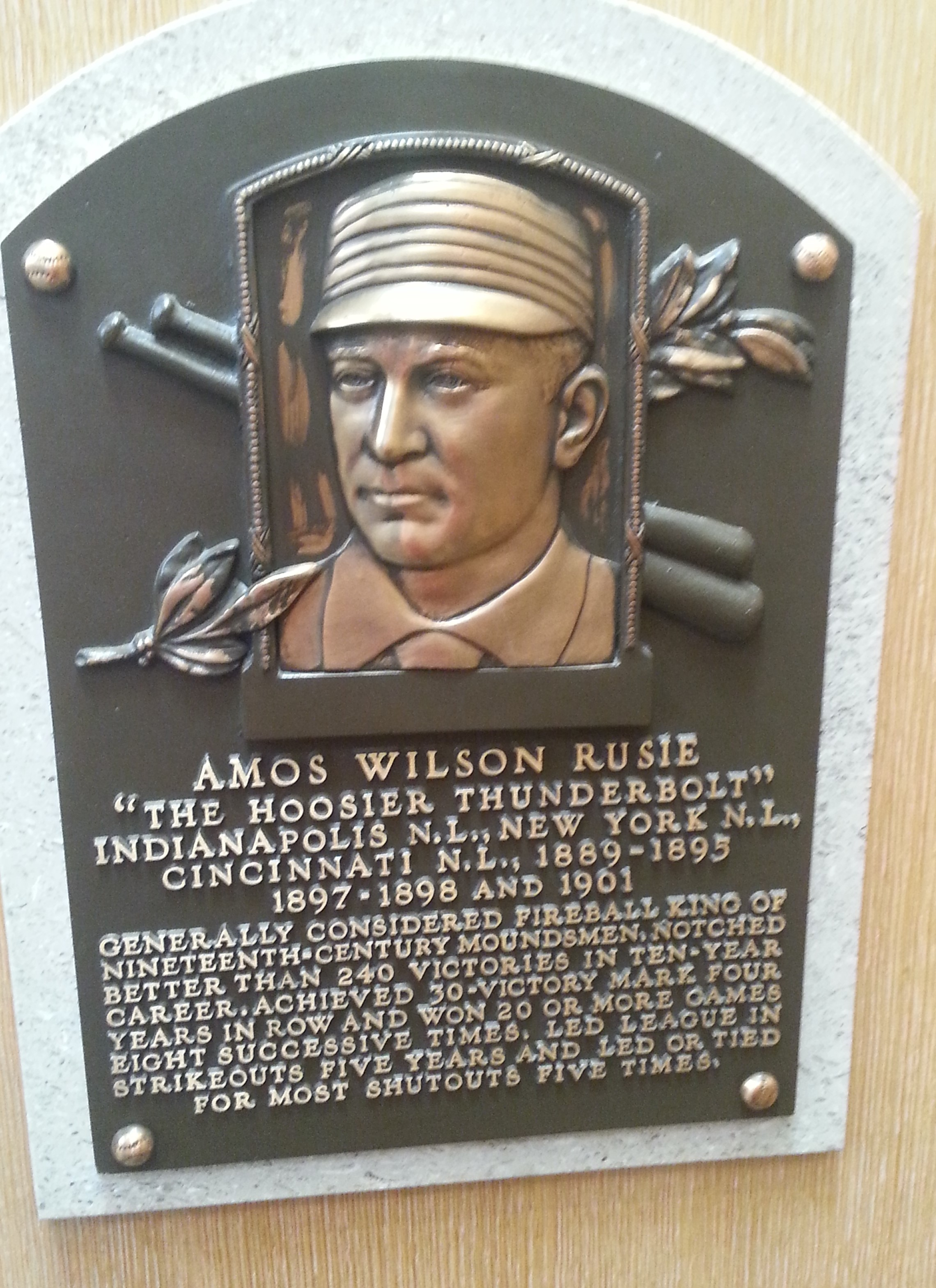
Plaque of Amos Rusie at the Baseball Hall of Fame

After the 1892 season, in a move that was orchestrated by Giants' owner Andrew Freedman, Amos Rusie was released in a move to get him to sign a new contract for lesser value. It was a typical move for a man who was considered to be both malevolent and stingy to his players. Despite a gentleman's agreement between the owners not to sign him, the Chicago White Stockings picked him for $8,250, which included a $2,000 bonus. The chagrined Giants bought the contract back and even had the temerity to try to count the bonus money as part of his salary. With the pitching area being moved back in 1893, Rusie's strikeout total dropped to 208; still he was the league leader. The 1893 campaign was a truly extraordinary one for Amos Rusie, with 50 complete games in 52 starts and went 33–21.

In 1894, Rusie won pitching's triple crown. He led the league in wins with 36–13, strikeouts with 195, and with a league best ERA of 2.78 (especially spectacular considering that the league average that year was 5.32). He also led the league in walks for the fifth straight time with an even 200. His pitching was keystone in leading the normally also-ran Giants to National League runner up that year.

After the conclusion of the 1894 regular season, a Pittsburgh sportsman named William C. Temple sponsored a trophy for the winner between the regular season 1st and 2nd place teams in the National League. The runner-up Giants swept the Baltimore Orioles, who featured Hall of Famers John McGraw and Wilbert Robinson, 4–0. Rusie was virtually untouchable in the Temple Cup, giving up only one earned run while winning two complete games and compiling a 0.50 ERA; if that was not enough, he even batted .429. Rusie's win total that year was fourth best since the establishment of the modern pitching distance of 60'-6".

Rusie won his last strikeout crown in the 1895 campaign with 201. However, he finished with a mediocre (by his standards) 23 wins and 23 losses. After a bitter contract dispute with Giants' owner Andrew Freedman, where the owner looked at his 23 losses and alleged he was slacking off in his training, Rusie responded by publicly thumbing his nose at Freedman — the 19th century variant of the middle finger. He was fined $200 (he made only $2,500 a year). Rusie refused to play until Freedman returned his money and ended up holding out for the entire 1896 season. It was a fiasco for baseball; fans boycotted and the press railed against the owners. Owners implored Rusie and Freedman to compromise; neither would budge. The holdout was finally settled just before the 1897 season, as the owners collaborated for recoupment of the garnished wages, as well as a $5,000 settlement ($193,500 in today's dollars). This was partially out of respect for Rusie. However, the primary motivator was the threat of legal action against the reserve clause had his case gone to court.

== Later life ==
Following the 1898 season, arm trouble, hearing damage from a line drive to the head, and other problems kept Rusie out of baseball for two years. In December 1900, after he had not pitched for them in two years, Rusie was traded to the Cincinnati Reds for Christy Mathewson. The trade is one of the most lopsided in baseball history; Rusie pitched poorly in three games before retiring, while Mathewson won 371 games for the Giants and was part of the inaugural class inducted into the Baseball Hall of Fame in 1936.

Rusie finished his career with 245 wins, 174 losses, 1,934 strikeouts and a 3.07 ERA. He was inducted into the Baseball Hall of Fame in 1977.

Rusie died in Seattle, Washington, in 1942.

== See also ==
- List of Major League Baseball annual ERA leaders
- List of Major League Baseball annual strikeout leaders
- List of Major League Baseball annual wins leaders
- List of Major League Baseball career strikeout leaders
- List of Major League Baseball career wins leaders
- List of Major League Baseball no-hitters
- Major League Baseball titles leaders
- Major League Baseball Triple Crown

| Preceded by Tom Lovett | No-hitter pitcher July 31, 1891 | Succeeded by Ted Breitenstein |
| Preceded by John Clarkson | National League Pitching Triple Crown; 1894 | Succeeded by Christy Mathewson |
