= Luther =

Luther most commonly refers to:

- Martin Luther (1483–1546), German priest credited with initiating the Protestant Reformation

Luther may also refer to:

== People ==
- Luther (given name)
- Luther (surname)

== Places ==
- Luther (crater), a lunar crater named after astronomer Robert Luther
- Luther, Indiana, an unincorporated community in the United States
- Luther, Iowa, a town in Boone County, Iowa, United States
- Luther, Michigan, a village in Lake County, United States
- Luther, Montana, an unincorporated community in Carbon County, United States
- Luther, Oklahoma, a town in Oklahoma County, Oklahoma, United States

== Arts, entertainment, and media ==
=== Fictional characters ===
- Luther, a character from The Adventures of Luther Arkwright limited comic book series
- Luther, a gang member in The Warriors (1979) American cult film
- Luther Bentley, the villain of Adventures of Captain Marvel (1941)
- Luther Stickell, a supporting character in the Mission: Impossible film franchise
- Detective Chief Inspector John Luther, the protagonist of the television series Luther

=== Films ===
- Luther (1928 film), a silent film starring Eugen Klöpfer
- Luther (1964 film), a TV play
- Luther (1974 film), a film starring Stacy Keach
- Luther (2003 film), a film starring Joseph Fiennes
- Luther: The Fallen Sun, a 2023 film based on the BBC TV series
- Luther: Never Too Much, a 2024 documentary

=== Music ===
- Luther (album), a 1976 album by American recording artist group Luther
- "Luther" (song), a 2024 song by Kendrick Lamar and SZA from Lamar's album, GNX
- Luther, a former band of Luther Vandross'

=== Other uses in arts, education, entertainment, and media ===
- Luther (comic strip), an American syndicated newspaper comic strip
- Luther (play), a 1961 play by John Osborne
- Luther (TV series), a British BBC crime drama featuring Idris Elba
- Dr. Luther, Canadian professional wrestler
- Luther University (루터대학교), a private university in Giheung-gu, Yongin, South Korea

== Food ==
- Luther Burger, a hamburger or cheeseburger with a doughnut in place of a bun

== See also ==
- 1303 Luthera, an asteroid named after astronomer Robert Luther
- Lothar (disambiguation), a Germanic given name
- Luther College (disambiguation), various educational institutions
- Lutheranism, the branch of Protestant Christianity begun by Martin Luther
- Luthier, a maker of stringed instruments
- Luthor (disambiguation)
