= Luter =

Surname list 2

Luter is a surname. Notable people with the surname include:

- Chip Luter (born 1985), American Baptist minister and son of Fred Luter
- Claude Luter (1923–2006), French jazz clarinetist and saxophonist
- Darrell Luter Jr. (born 2000), American football player
- Elizabeth W. Luter (born 1956), American resource person, wife of Fred Luter
- Fred Luter (born 1956), American Baptist minister and church leader
- Joseph W. Luter III (1939–2025), American meat processing executive
- Mick Luter (born 1978), American rapper

== See also ==
- Luther (surname)
