= Luthor (disambiguation) =

Lex Luthor is a DC Comics supervillain and Superman's archenemy.

Luthor may also refer to related fictional characters:

- Alexander Luthor Jr., from an alternate universe
- Clark Luthor, an alter ego of Ultraman
- Lena Luthor, Lex's younger sister, half-sister, or daughter, depending on the version
- Lenny Luthor, Lex's nephew in the movie Superman IV: The Quest for Peace
- Lionel Luthor, Lex's father in the television series Smallville
- Alexis Luthor, a 31st-century descendant of Lex Luthor and a villain in the TV series Legion of Super Heroes
- Alexis Luthor, the daughter of Lex Luthor on Earth-16 who has appeared in The Multiversity
- "Luthors", an episode of the TV series Supergirl

== See also ==
- Luther (disambiguation)
