= Luther (given name) =

The name Luther is a masculine name of German origin meaning army. It was once exclusive to Evangelical Protestants honoring the ecclesiastical reformer and theologian Martin Luther, founder of the Protestant Church.

Notable people with the given name Luther include:

== First name ==
- Luther Adler (1903–1984), American actor
- Luther Aholo (c. 1833–1888), Hawaiian politician
- Luther Allison (1939–1997), American blues guitarist
- Luther Archimède (born 1999), Guadeloupean footballer
- Luther Badger (1785–1868), American congressman from New York
- Luther E. Barnhardt (1903–1980), American politician
- Luther Fuller (c. 1818–1841), American helmsman
- Luther Barnes (born 1954), American musician
- Luther Loren Baxter (1832–1915), American politician and judge
- Luther Standing Bear (1868–1939), Oglala Lakota writer and actor
- Luther Biggs, American professional wrestler
- Luther Blissett (born 1958), English footballer
- Luther Blount (1916–2006), American businessman
- Luther Blue (born 1954), American gridiron football player
- Luther D. Bradley (1853–1917), American cartoonist
- Luther Prentice Bradley (1822–1910), American soldier and Union general
- Luther von Braunschweig (1275–1335), Grand Master of the Teutonic Order from 1331 to 1335
- Luther B. Bridgers (1884–1948), American songwriter and minister
- Luther Buchanan, Jamaican politician
- Luther Burbank (1849–1926), American botanist and horticulturist
- Luther Burden (1953–2015), American basketball player
- Luther Burden III (born 2003), American football player
- Luther Burrell (born 1987), English professional rugby union player
- Luther Burbank (1849–1926), American botanist
- Luther Campbell (born 1960), American rapper and record executive
- Luther C. Carter (1805–1875), American politician
- Luther F. Carter (born 1950), American university president
- Luther V. Carter (1879–1929), American politician
- Luther Christman (1915–2011), American nursing professor and administrator
- Luther Cifers (born 1974), American politician
- Luther A. Cole (1812–1880), American businessman and politician
- Luther F. Cole (1925–2013), American lawyer, judge and politician
- Luther Cressman (1897–1994), American archaeologist
- Luther Davis (1916–2008), American playwright and screenwriter
- Luther Day (1813–1885), American judge
- Luther Dickinson (born 1973), American musician
- Luther Dixon (1931–2009), American songwriter, record producer, and singer
- Luther S. Dixon (1825–1891), American lawyer, jurist, and Wisconsin pioneer
- Luther Elliss (born 1973), American football player and coach
- Luther Boyd Eubanks (1917–1996), American judge
- Luther H. Evans (1902–1981), American political scientist
- Luther Farrell (1893–1956), nicknamed "Red", American baseball player
- Luther Kombong (1950–2017), an Indonesian politician
- Luther Ford, British actor
- Luther Carrington Goodrich (1894–1986), American sinologist
- Luther E. Grice (1881–1953), American attorney and politician
- Luther Gulick (1865–1918), American physical education instructor and basketball official
- Luther Gulick (1892–1993), American academic
- Luther Halsey Gulick (1892–1993), American political scientist
- Luther Goldman (1909–2005), American naturalist and wildlife photographer
- Luther Marcellus Goddard (1840–1917), American judge
- Luther Grosvenor (born 1946), English musician
- Luther Hackman (born 1974), American former professional baseball
- Luther Hakunavanhu (born 1996), Zimbabwean-Canadian gridiron football
- Luther E. Hall (1869–1921), American politician
- Luther Hare (1851–1929), American military officer
- Luther Head (born 1982), American basketball player
- Luther Henderson (1919–2003), American arranger, composer, orchestrator, and pianist
- Luther Holbert (c. 1852–1904), African American man tortured and lynched
- Luther Emmett Holt (1855–1924), American pediatrician and author
- Luther Ingram (1937–2007), American singer-songwriter
- Luther Porter Jackson (1892–1950), American historian
- Luther James-Wildin (born 1997), English Association football player
- Luther M. Jarrett (1804–1854), American politician
- Luther P. Jefferson (died 1941), American politician
- Luther Johnson, several people
- Luther Jordan (1950–2002), American politician
- Luther Kelly (1849–1928), American soldier, hunter, scout, adventurer, and administrator
- Luther Kent (1948–2024), American singer
- Luther Kountze (1841–1918), American banker
- Luther C. Ladd (1843–1861), American soldier
- Luther Lassiter (1918–1988), American pool player
- Luther Maddy (born 1993), Haitian-American football player
- Luther Magby (1896–1966), American gospel singer
- Luther Martin (1748–1826), American lawyer and political leader
- Luther McCarty (1892–1913), American boxer
- Luther McDonald (1906–1976), American Negro league pitcher
- Luther F. McKinney (1841–1922), American politician
- Luther Munakandafa (born 2004), English footballer
- Luther Parker (1800–1853), American political figure
- Luther Pennington (1921–2014), American United Methodist pastor and politician
- Luther Perkins (1928–1968) American guitarist
- Luther G. Presley (1887–1974), American songwriter and composer
- Luther Rackley (1946–2017), American basketball player
- Luther Robinson (born 1991), American football player
- Luther Russell (born 1970), American musician
- Luther B. Scherer (1879–1957), American businessman
- Luther Simjian (1905–1997), American-Armenian inventor
- Luther Singh (born 1997), South African footballer
- Luther Skaggs Jr. (1923–1976), American USMC Medal of Honor recipient
- Luther Ely Smith (1873–1951), American lawyer and civic booster
- Luther R. Stevens (1889–1973), American military officer
- Luther Strange (born 1953), American politician
- Luther Terry (1911–1985), American physician and public health official
- Luther C. Tibbets (1820–1902), American merchant and farmer
- Luther Tucker (1936–1993), American blues guitarist
- Luther Vandross (1951–2005), American singer-songwriter
- Luther B. Way (1879–1943), American judge
- Luther A. Weigle (1880–1976), American minister
- Luther Wright (born 1971), American basketball player
- Luther Youngdahl (1896–1978), American state governor and federal judge

== Middle name ==
- Colin Luther Powell (1937–2021), American politician and diplomat
- John Luther Adams (born 1953), American composer
- Martin Luther King Jr. (1929–1968), American Baptist minister and human rights activist
- Martin Luther King Sr. (1899–1984), American Baptist pastor and human rights activist
- Martin Luther King III (born 1957), American human rights activist and son of Martin Luther King Jr.
- William Luther Pierce (1933–2002), American neo-nazi political activist

== Nickname ==
- Luther Blissett (pseudonym), nom de plume for several artists and writers
- Dr. Luther (born Len Olson, 1968), Canadian professional wrestler
- Luther Reigns (born Matthew Weise, 1971), American retired professional wrestler

== Fiction ==
- Luther Stickell, character in the Mission: Impossible film series

== See also ==
- Luther (disambiguation)
- Luther (surname)
