= Doc McJames =

American baseball player (1874–1901)

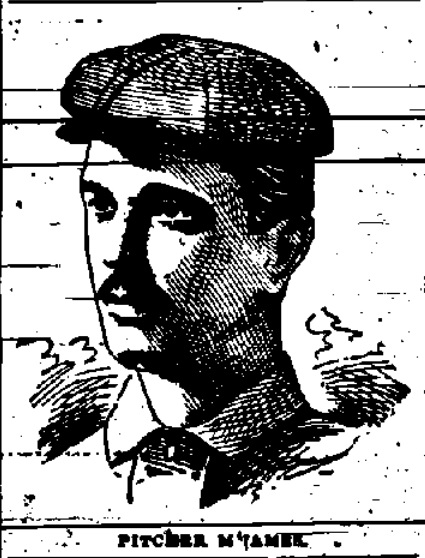
- Pitcher
- Born: August 27, 1874; Williamsburg County, South Carolina, U.S.
- Died: September 23, 1901 (aged 27); Charleston, South Carolina, U.S.
- Batted: Unknown Threw: Right

MLB debut
- September 24, 1895, for the Washington Senators

Last MLB appearance
- July 13, 1901, for the Brooklyn Superbas

MLB statistics
- Win–loss record: 79–80
- Earned run average: 3.43
- Strikeouts: 593
- Stats at Baseball Reference

Teams
- Washington Senators (1895–1897); Baltimore Orioles (1898); Brooklyn Superbas (1899, 1901)

Career highlights and awards
- NL strikeout leader (1897)

James McCutchen McJames (August 27, 1874 – September 23, 1901) was an American professional baseball player. He was a right-handed pitcher over parts of six seasons (1895–1899, 1901) with the Washington Senators, Baltimore Orioles, and Brooklyn Superbas. He was the National League strikeout champion in 1897 with the Washington Senators. For his career, he compiled a 79–80 record in 178 appearances, with a 3.43 earned run average (ERA) and 593 strikeouts.

== Early career ==
Following his breakout year with the Washington Senators in 1897, McJames was sold to the Baltimore Orioles where he achieved stardom with a 27–15 record, pitched 40 complete games in 42 starts, and had an earned run average of 2.36 in the 1898 season. McJames was second in the league with 178 strikeouts, fourth in ERA, and fourth in complete games. This 1898 Orioles squad has long been considered one of the best teams ever, with McJames as the team's star pitcher. This team included such baseball legends as John McGraw, Willie Keeler, Hughie Jennings, and Wild Bill Donovan. The following season the owners of the Baltimore Orioles purchased a half interest in the Brooklyn Bridegrooms (dubbed the "Superbas" by the media) and took their best players with them. This included James, Jennings, Keeler, Jay Hughes, and Joe Kelley. During the final game of 1899, his first season with the Superbas, James came within one out of throwing a no-hitter in his 4–0 victory over the Boston Beaneaters. The no-hitter was spoiled by future Hall of Famer Hugh Duffy with a ninth-inning single.

== Personal ==
McJames was the great-grandson of Judge William Dobein James, who, at age 16 served in the Williamsburgh Militia under General Francis Marion, during the American Revolution. William James later wrote a Life of Marion, which is much used today as a reference because of its first-hand information. Doc McJames was also the great-great grandson of Major John James, chief officer under Francis "Swamp Fox" Marion of Revolutionary War fame.

James went by his formal name of James McJames during his first season, then changed to "Doc" for the remainder of his career. It is speculated that he did so to hide knowledge of his baseball career from his parents, as playing baseball was not reputable at the time. He had a clause in each of his major league contracts preventing teams from playing him on Sundays.

Before playing professional baseball, McJames attended the University of South Carolina. He was the first Gamecocks baseball player to make it to the major leagues. While at South Carolina, McJames played guard on the school's inaugural football team, in 1892. McJames practiced medicine in Cheraw, South Carolina. Cheraw was an active baseball town in this period and produced several other notable baseball players. James is buried in Old St. David's Cemetery in Cheraw, South Carolina.

McJames was born in Williamsburg County, South Carolina. At the peak of his career, he attended medical school at the Charleston Medical College (now Medical University of South Carolina) in the off-season, graduating after three years in 1900.

== Death ==
McJames later left baseball to briefly practice medicine with his father and brother in South Carolina. While making a house call, McJames was thrown from a horse-drawn carriage and within a month died from complications. He was 27 years old.

== See also ==
- List of baseball players who died during their careers
- List of Major League Baseball annual strikeout leaders
