= Mick Luter =

American rapper

Milton W. Luter (born 1978), better known by the stage name Mick Luter, is an American rapper based in Chicago, Illinois.

== Early life ==
Luter was born in Dallas, Texas. When he was 10 years old, his mother took him and his younger brother Victor back to her hometown of Chicago, Illinois, due to domestic conflicts. Luter graduated from Whitney Young Magnet High School in 1996. He went on to attend Temple University where he began rapping seriously, inspired by the local rap scene in Philadelphia. In the Summer of 1999, he met a young MC known as Wasalu, also known as Lupe Fiasco. The following Summer, in 2000, they both entered the 2000 Source Magazine Rap Battle. Luter came fourth in the nationwide competition in New York.

=== Career ===
Luter released his first LP, The Word in 2003. The LP was mostly produced by No I.D. and Skip Lava. Lava and Luter had attended Whitney M. Young together and continued to work together as a group named "TheSpotter and TheShooter". Luter then released The Mickstape Vol.1—Hustle Harder and collaborated with producer SC. In 2007, Luter signed a recording deal with Epic Records after winning a national competition for unsigned performers sponsored by Music Nation and SESAC.

== Discography ==
=== Albums ===
- My Word (2003, Day 1/Stay Humble)

=== Mixtapes ===
- The Mickstape Vol.1—Hustle Harder (2007, Day 1/Stay Humble)
- The Lesson (2008, Day 1/Stay Humble)
- The Myth with DJ G-Spot (2011, Day 1/Stay Humble)

=== Singles ===
- "The Science" (2003)
- "Bless the Bottle" (2005)
- "Someday" (2006)
- "How We're Raised" (2007)
- "J-Down" (2008)
