= Bill Hutchison (baseball) =

American baseball player (1859–1926)

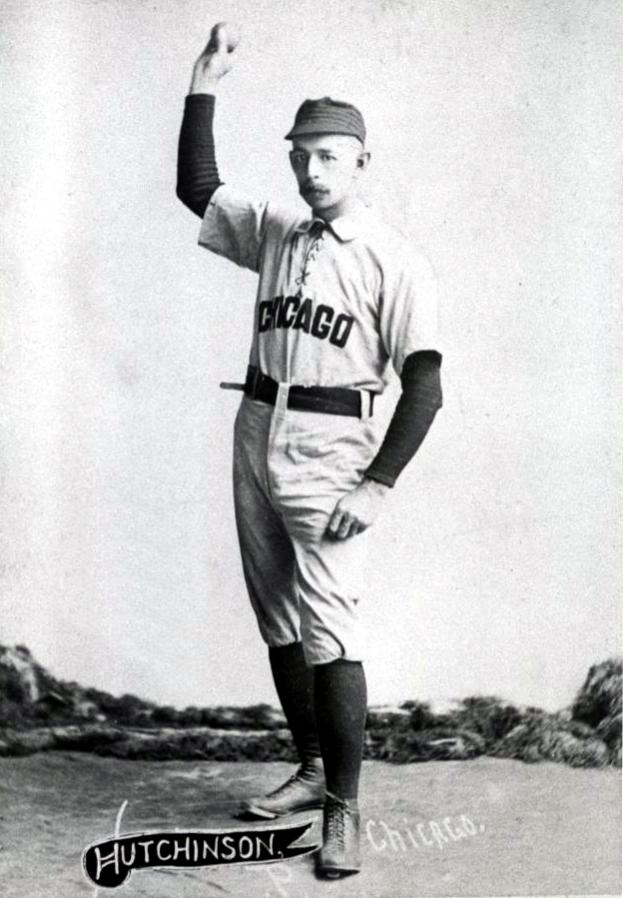
- Hutchison in 1889
- Pitcher
- Born: December 17, 1859; New Haven, Connecticut, U.S.
- Died: March 19, 1926 (aged 66); Kansas City, Missouri, U.S.
- Batted: Right Threw: Right

MLB debut
- June 10, 1884, for the Kansas City Cowboys

Last MLB appearance
- May 20, 1897, for the St. Louis Browns

MLB statistics
- Win–loss record: 182–163
- Earned run average: 3.59
- Strikeouts: 1,235
- Stats at Baseball Reference

Teams
- Kansas City Cowboys (1884); Chicago White Stockings/Colts (1889–1895); St. Louis Browns (1897)

Career highlights and awards
- 3× NL wins leader (1890–1892); NL strikeout leader (1892)

William Forrest "Wild Bill" Hutchison (Note: Often misspelled "Hutchinson".) (December 17, 1859 – March 19, 1926) was an American professional baseball player. He was a right-handed pitcher over parts of nine seasons (1884, 1889–1895, 1897) with the Kansas City Cowboys, Chicago White Stockings/Colts, and St. Louis Browns. He was the National League wins leader for three straight seasons (1890–1892) and the strikeout leader in 1892 with Chicago. For his career, he compiled a 182–163 record in 376 appearances, with a 3.59 earned run average and 1,235 strikeouts. He is the last player in baseball history to pitch 500 innings in a single season, a feat which he last accomplished in 1892, appearing in 75 games in a 146-game season and pitching 622 innings overall.

During his seven seasons with the Chicago franchise (now the Chicago Cubs) he ranks 4th all-time in franchise history in wins (181), 6th in games pitched (367), 2nd in innings pitched (3021), 6th in strikeouts (1224), 3rd in games started (339), 1st in complete games (317), 10th in shutouts (21), 1st in base on balls allowed (1109), 1st in losses (158), and 1st in wild pitches (120).

He was born in New Haven, Connecticut, attended Yale University, and later died in Kansas City, Missouri at the age of 66.

== See also ==
- List of Major League Baseball annual saves leaders
- List of Major League Baseball annual strikeout leaders
- List of Major League Baseball annual wins leaders
