= George Luther =

American politician

Member of the Michigan House of Representatives from the Ottawa County 2nd district
- In office January 7, 1863 – February 25, 1865
- Preceded by: District established
- Succeeded by: Wales F. Storrs

Personal details
- Born: May 3, 1823 Livingston County, New York
- Died: December 23, 1884 (aged 61)
- Party: Republican
- Spouse: Elizabeth Seymore

George Luther (May 3, 1823 – December 23, 1884) was a Michigan politician.

== Early life ==
Luther was born on May 3, 1823, in Bristol, Rhode Island. In 1841, Luther moved to Grand Rapids, Michigan. Later, he moved to Lamont, Michigan.

== Career ==
Luther was a merchant. On November 4, 1862, Luther was elected to the Michigan House of Representatives where he began representing the Ottawa County 2nd district on January 7, 1863. On February 25, 1865, resigned from this position.

== Personal life ==
Luther was married to Elizabeth Seymore.

== Death ==
Luther died on December 23, 1884. He was interred at Maplewood Cemetery in Lamont.
