= Suzanne Luther =

American politician

Member-elect of the Missouri House of Representatives from the 60th district
- Assuming office January 6, 2027
- Succeeding: Dave Griffith

Personal details
- Party: Democratic
- Education: University of Missouri
- Website: Campaign website

Suzanne Luther is an American politician of the Missouri Democratic Party who is the representative-elect for the 60th district in the Missouri House of Representatives. She was elected in the 2026 general election. She graduated from the University of Missouri. She is an educator and school board member.
