= Luther College =

Luther College is the name of several Lutheran educational institutions:

== Australia ==
- Luther College (Victoria), a co-educational independent secondary school of the Lutheran Church of Australia, located in Croydon, Victoria

== Canada ==
- Luther College (Saskatchewan), in Regina; affiliated with the University of Regina and the Evangelical Lutheran Church in Canada
- Martin Luther University College, in Waterloo, Ontario; affiliated with Wilfrid Laurier University and the Evangelical Lutheran Church in Canada

== United States ==
- Luther College (Iowa), in Decorah; a college of the Evangelical Lutheran Church in America
- Luther College (Louisiana), in New Orleans; a college of the Evangelical Lutheran Synodical Conference of North America
- Luther College, a former college in Wahoo, Nebraska; merged in 1962 with Midland Lutheran College of Fremont, Nebraska
- St. Paul-Luther College, (also known as Phalen Luther College) a former tertiary institution in St. Paul, Minnesota; merged into Wartburg College in the 1930s
- Martin Luther College, in New Ulm, Minnesota

== See also ==
- Luther Seminary, Evangelical Lutheran Church in America seminary in St. Paul, Minnesota
