= Luther Farrell =

American baseball player (1893–1956)

- Pitcher
- Born: July 13, 1893; Bartow, Florida, U.S.
- Died: December 1956 (aged 63); Miami, Florida, U.S.
- Batted: Left Threw: Left

Negro league baseball debut
- 1919, for the Lincoln Giants

Last appearance
- 1934, for the Bacharach Giants
- Stats at Baseball Reference

Teams
- Lincoln Giants (1919, 1925, 1930); Indianapolis ABCs (1919); Chicago Giants (1920–1921); St. Louis Giants (1920); Gilkerson's Union Giants (1922–1924); Chicago American Giants (1923); Bacharach Giants (1925–1929, 1934); New York Black Yankees (1932–1933)

Luther Alaner Farrell (July 13, 1893 – December, 1956), nicknamed "Red", was an American professional baseball pitcher in the Negro leagues. He played from 1919 to 1934 with several teams, playing mostly for the Bacharach Giants.

Farrell played for the 1926 and 1927 Bacharach Giants that were champions of the Eastern Colored League and played in the 1926 and 1927 Colored World Series that the Bacharach Giants lost to the Chicago American Giants both years. In 1926, he mostly played right field, and in Game 1 of the series he hit a home run in the bottom of the seventh inning that tied the game. The game ended in a 3–3 tie when it was called on account of darkness after nine innings. In 1927 Farrell was primarily a pitcher, and he pitched in five games in the Colored World Series, starting four of them, with a 2–2 record. In Game 5 he pitched a 7-inning complete game and didn't allow any hits for what is sometimes called a "shortened no-hitter"; the game was called due to darkness after 7 innings. The Bacharach Giants won 3–2, with the American Giants scoring two unearned runs.
