= St. Paul Saints (1884–1900) =

- 1884–1901; (1877, 1884, 1886–1891, 1895–1899, 1901); St. Paul, Minnesota

Minor league affiliations
- Class: Independent (1877, 1884, 1886–1891); Class A (1895–1899, 1901)
- League: League Alliance (1877); Northwestern League (1884), (1); Union Association (1884), (2); Northwestern League (1886–1887); Western Association (1888–1891); Western League (1892, 1895–1899); Western League II (1901)

Major league affiliations
- Team: None

Minor league titles
- League titles (0): None

Team data
- Name: St. Paul Red Caps (1877); St. Paul Apostles (1884), (1); St. Paul Saints (Union Association) (1884), (2); St. Paul Freezers (1886); St. Paul Saints (1887); St. Paul Apostles (1888–1891); St. Paul Saints (1892, 1895–1899, 1901)
- Ballpark: West Seventh Street Park (1884, 1886–1891); Dale and Aurora Grounds (1886–1891, 1895–1896); Lexington Park (1897–1899, 1901)

The St. Paul Saints were an early minor league baseball team based in St. Paul, Minnesota, United States. The "Saints" franchise played as members of the Western League in 1892 and from 1895 to 1899. The St. Paul Saints were owned and managed by Charles Comiskey, who moved the team to become the Chicago White Sox of the American League following the 1899 season.

Prior to their Western League tenure, St. Paul teams played as a member of the League Alliance (1877), Northwestern League (1884, 1886–1887) and Western Association (1888–1891). After the end of the 1884 Northwestern League season, on September 8, 1884, the St Paul Saints joined the major league Union Association to complete the 1884 season, replacing a team that had folded.

St. Paul teams hosted minor league home games at West Seventh Street Park and Dale and Aurora Grounds, before moving to Lexington Park which was newly constructed in 1897. Lexington Park was built and owned by Comiskey.

The Saints played the 1901 season in the reformed Western League, and the 1902 St. Paul Saints continued play after joining the newly formed American Association, beginning a tenure in the league that lasted until 1960. Today, the Saints nickname is used by the St. Paul Saints of the Class AAA level International League.

== History ==
=== Baseball beginnings in St. Paul ===
Organized baseball games in St. Paul were reported in local newspapers as early as 1859.

Minor league baseball in St. Paul began in 1877, when the St. Paul "Red Caps" team became members of the League Alliance. The league was an early minor league that loosely organized numerous teams playing some common opponents. The "alliance" was an early attempt to organize local professional teams against more quality competition.

The league was mainly regional and had no set league schedule or calendar and teams would play games against other local teams outside of the league alliance. On February 4, 1877, the Indianapolis Blues and the Milwaukee team joined the alliance by signing an agreement. In February, the St. Paul Red Caps, Memphis Red Stockings, Chicago Fairbanks and Brooklyn Chelseas joined. Other teams subsequently signing the League Alliance agreement were the Binghamton Crickets, Syracuse Stars, Lowell, Minneapolis Browns, Philadelphia Athletics, the Janesville Mutuals of Janesville, Wisconsin; and Fall River, Massachusetts. In total, thirteen clubs are generally recognized as members of the League Alliance. Another 15 locally based teams were affiliated with their regions' League Alliance team.

With scheduling being local, just five alliance members played as many as thirty games against each other: St. Paul, Minneapolis, Indianapolis, Milwaukee and Syracuse. St. Paul and Minneapolis played against each other in 36 games, with St. Paul winning 19 of the 36 contests.

St. Paul also won the most total games against League Alliance opponents, 28. The League Alliance structure was abandoned after the 1877 season.

=== 1884 season: Two leagues / Major League status ===
The 1884 St. Paul Apostles of the Northwestern League resumed play. The "Apostles" and "Saints" nicknames were used interchangeably in the era. The team began the 1884 season as members of the 14-team Northwestern League. At age 37, St Paul owner and manager Andrew Thompson began a tenure with the team that continued through 1892. There were 14 members of the Northwestern League. In September 1884, after compiling a 29–54 record in Northwestern League play, St. Paul stood 30.0 games behind First place Grand Rapids. The Northwestern League season ended on September 8, 1884, due to financial difficulties within the league. Shortly after the Northwestern League folded, the St. Paul team was invited to join a major league, with Andrew Thompson remaining as manager. St. Paul ended the Northwestern League season in ninth place of the 12 league teams, playing under managers Lem Hunter and Andrew Thompson.

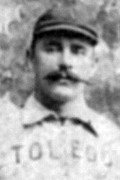
(1884) Frank Olin, Toledo Blue Stockings. Olin also played for St. Paul in 1884. He is the namesake of the Olin Corporation, the Franklin W. Olin Foundation and the Franklin W. Olin College of Engineering.

Outfielder Frank Olin played for St. Paul in the Northwestern League, batting .269 in 32 games at age 24. Before the 1884 season concluded, Olin played in the major leagues with both the Washington Nationals (AA) and Toledo Blue Stockings. Olin then played for the Detroit Wolverines in the 1885 season. Following the conclusion of his baseball career, Olin became a notable businessman, founding the Western Cartridge Company and owning the Winchester Repeating Arms Company among others. Olin is the namesake of the Olin Corporation in business as well as the Franklin W. Olin Foundation and the Franklin W. Olin College of Engineering.

On September 27, 1884, after the folding of the Northwestern League, the St. Paul team resumed play in the major league Union Association. Their fellow Northwestern League rival, the Milwaukee Brewers also joined the Union Association to finish the season. The St. Paul team resumed play in the major league Union Association known as the St. Paul Saints or "White Caps." In joining the league, St. Paul replaced the folded Chicago Browns/Pittsburgh Stogies franchise in the league, while Milwaukee finished the schedule of the folded Philadelphia Keystones / Wilmington Quicksteps franchise.

Playing in the major League, St. Paul finished the remainder of the Union Association season by compiling a record of 2–6–1 while playing strictly road games. In the process, the 1884 St. Paul Saints became the only major league team to never host a single home game. The 1884 Union Association folded after playing its only season of play.

When the Northwestern League folded following the completion of its 1884 season and the Northwestern League did not reform, St. Paul did not host a minor league or major league team in 1885.

=== 1885: Potential Western League charter franchise fails ===
In 1885, St. Paul attempted to continue minor league play. St. Paul was in line to become a charter member of the Western League, which was forming for the first time. St. Paul attempted to join the Cleveland Forest Citys, Indianapolis Hoosiers, Kansas City Blues, Milwaukee Brewers and Toledo Avengers in the newly formed league. However, Omaha, Nebraska gained the Omaha Omahogs franchise in the new league after St. Paul, Minnesota, withdrew their proposed team. St. Paul was replaced when the proposed franchise was unable to guarantee and secure the necessary funding for league membership.

The Western League was officially formed as a minor league on February 11, 1885, without St. Paul becoming a member. The meeting was held in Indianapolis with representatives from Kansas City, Milwaukee, Indianapolis, Cleveland, St. Paul, Toledo, and Nashville being present. The 1885 Western League began play, on April 18, 1885, but folded on June 15, 1885.

=== 1886 & 1887: Northwestern League ===
After their attempt at forming a team in 1885 was unsuccessful, St. Paul next hosted minor league baseball in the 1886 season, when their former league reformed. The St. Paul team was called the St. Paul Freezers for that year and played the 1886 season as members of the six-team Independent level Northwestern League, which had reformed after not playing in 1885. The Duluth Jayhawks, Eau Claire Lumbermen, Milwaukee Brewers, Minneapolis Millers and Oshkosh teams joined St. Paul in league play. The Freezers were managed by John Barnes, who began a three-season managing tenure with St. Paul. In their return to the Northwestern League, St. Paul ended the 1886 with a record of 37–43. In the six-team league, the Freezers ended the season in fourth place, finishing the season 9½ games behind the first place Duluth Jayhawks.

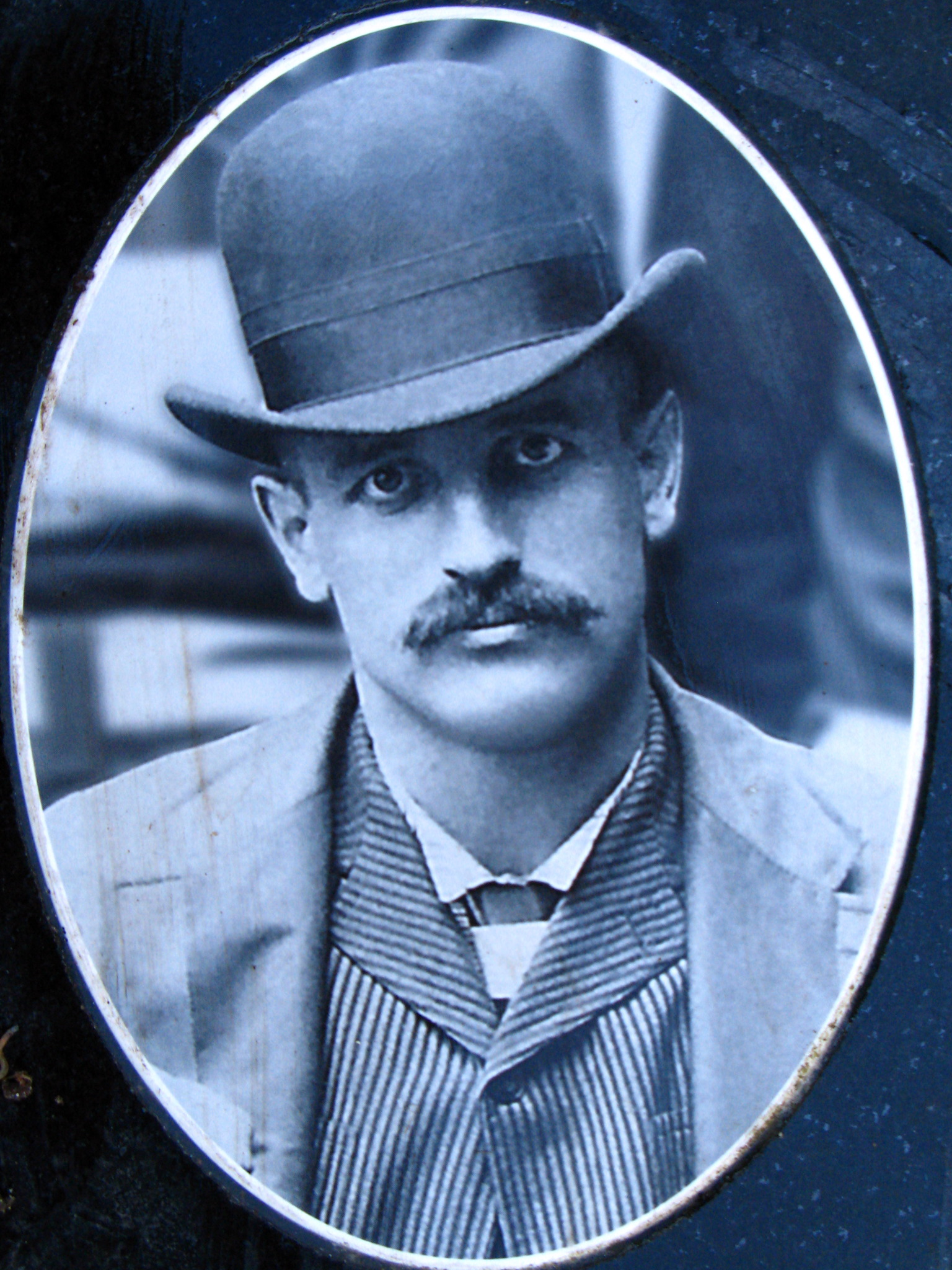
John Barnes managed St. Paul for three seasons

In the early baseball era, baseball team nicknames were informal and most often derived from newspaper coverage. While the early St. Paul teams were called the "Apostles" in baseball publications, historians reviewing local newspapers found the "Saints" nickname was used most commonly for the early St. Paul teams and the two nicknames were interchangeable.

The 1887 St. Paul team again was known as the St. Paul Saints and St. Paul played the season under returning manager John Barnes. The franchise remained as members of the Northwestern League as the league expanded to eight teams. The "Saints" is a nickname that has remained in use by St. Paul minor league teams over one century of play. With the Northwestern League schedule beginning on April 30, 1887, St. Paul joined the Des Moines Hawkeyes, Duluth Freezers, Eau Claire, LaCrosse Freezers, Milwaukee Cream Citys, Minneapolis Millers and Oshkosh teams in league play.

The Saint Paul Saints finished the 1887 Northwestern League season in third place, compiling a 75–45 record manager under John Barnes. With their third-place finish, the Saints ended the season 2½ games behind first place Oshkosh in the final league standings. Oshkosh was managed by Baseball Hall of Fame member Frank Selee. St. Paul Saints pitcher Bill Sowders won 34 games and had 266 strikeouts to lead the Northwestern League pitchers in both categories. Sowers pitched in 52 games for the Saints and threw 48 complete games covering 441 innings with a 2.14 ERA. Saints players Clarence Murphy scored 142 runs and Walt Wilmot had 18 triples, to lead the league. St. Paul first baseman Al McCauley notably batted .401 for Saints, collecting 199 hits on the season while finishing third in the league in batting average.

Despite expanding to eight teams, the Northwestern League folded and did not return to play in 1888. St. Paul continued minor league play in a new league.

=== 1888 to 1891: Western Association ===
After the folding of the Northwestern League following the 1887 season, St. Paul resumed professional baseball play in a newly formed minor league in the 1888 season. The Saint Paul Apostles became charter members of the Class A level Western Association. In forming the ten–team Western Association, St. Paul joined with the Chicago Maroons, Davenport Onion Weeders, Des Moines Prohibitionists, Kansas City Blues, Milwaukee Brewers, Minneapolis Millers, Omaha Omahogs, Sioux City Cornhuskers and St. Louis Whites franchises in the newly formed league.

St. Paul team owner Andrew Thompson retained all shares of stock in the organization after St. Paul manager John Barnes "politely" declined a co-ownership offer from Thompson for $10,000. Barnes first began his tenure with the St. Paul franchise in 1884 when he served as the secretary of the team. It was noted in the local newspaper that Barnes abstained "from tobacco and liquor in any form, thereby setting a good example for the players."

In returning to play, St. Paul had strong season, ending the 1888 season in third place in the ten-team Western Association season, finishing the season with a 61–38 record. No league playoffs were held. With their third-place finish, St. Paul finished the season 5½ games behind the first place Kansas City Blues in the final league standings. The League champion Kansas City team was led on the field by Baseball Hall of Fame member Kid Nichols, who had league best 16–2 record and 1.14 ERA age 18. St. Paul outfielder Scrappy Carroll hit 16 home runs to lead the Western Association.

St. Paul continued play in 1889, as the Western Association reduced to an eight-team league. The Apostles ended the season with another strong showing, compiling a 74–46 record in Western Association play. Both Andrew Thompson and John Barnes were both listed as managers in this era, with Thompson owning the franchise. St. Paul ended the season second place in the final Western Association league standings, finishing the season schedule 8.0 games behind the first place Omaha Omahogs, who were led to the championship by their manager, Hall of Famer Frank Selee. St. Paul infielder Charlie Reilly had league leading 27 home runs, a high total for the era, while also batting .341 in the Western Association season.

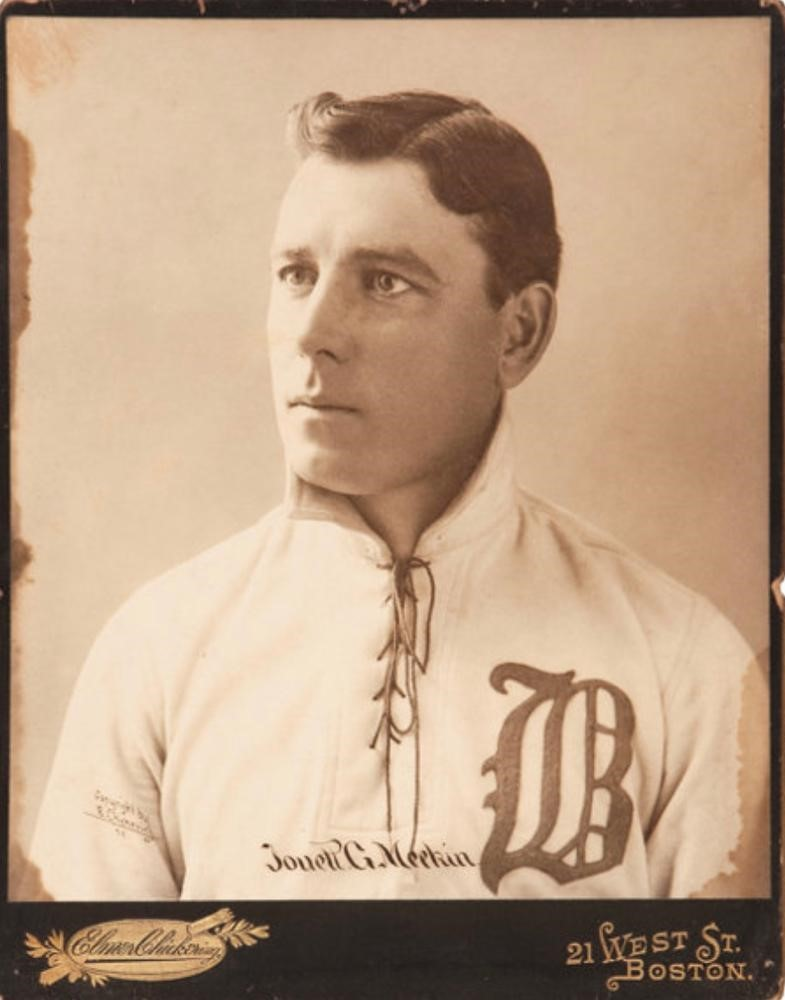
(1899) Jouett Meekin, Boston Beaneaters. Meekin pitched for St. Paul in 1889, compiling a 1.92 ERA with 13 wins in his first professional season. He went on to win 153 major league games. A hard thrower, Meekin played a role in the pitching mound being moved back to today's standard of 60 feet, 6 inches.

At age 22, Jouett Meekin pitched for St. Paul in his first professional season, compiling 13–13 record with a 1.92 ERA in 1889. Meekin went on to pitch in the major leagues for the Louisville Colonels (1891–1892), Washington Senators (1892–1893), New York Giants (1894–1899), Boston Beaneaters (1899) and Pittsburgh Pirates (1900), compiling a 153–133 career major league record with a 4.07 ERA. Meekin had a 33–9 record for the New York Giants in 1894. In his major league career, Meekin was noted to be one of the three hardest-throwing pitchers of his era, along with Hall of Fame pitchers Cy Young and Amos Rusie. The three were instrumental in the move of the baseball pitching mound from 55 feet, 6 inches further back to 60 feet, 6 inches, where it remains today. Meekin had reputation as a "head-hunter," stating that good hitters should have pitches go "within an inch of his head or body."

Sun Daly played for St. Paul in 1889 having begun the season with the Minneapolis Millers, joining St. Paul on May 29, 1889, after his release from Minneapolis. Daly returned to the St. Paul in 1890. An outfielder, Daly was nicknamed "Sun" as he did not wear sunglasses while he was playing in the field.

In June 1890, Bill Watkins became the team president during the season, replacing Andrew Thompson. Upon inheriting the team, in August 1890, The Sporting Life reported Watkins released numerous players and cut other players' salaries to reduce expenses. Prior to joining St. Paul, Watkins had managed in the major leagues and he had a career in baseball that spanned 47 years.

The St. Paul Apostles had a poor season in 1890, finishing in last place in the eight-team Western Association. St, Paul ended their eighth-place season with a final record of 37–84, playing under managers Andrew Thompson and Bill Watkins. St, Paul ended 43.0 games behind the first place Kansas City Blues in the final standings. For the second time, Scrappy Carroll won a home run title while playing for St. Palu as Carroll hit a league leading 21 home runs. St. Paul pitcher Willard Mains had the dubious distinction of leading the league as he hit 40 batters with pitches.

On the season, Willard Maines compiled a 32–13 record for St. Paul at age 20, with 40 complete games and 402 innings pitched. Before his tenure with St. Paul, Willard Maines had played in the major leagues with the (1888) Chicago White Stockings (Today's Chicago Cubs). After his season with the Saints, he pitched for the Cincinnati Kelly's Killers, (1891), Milwaukee Brewers (1891) and Boston Beaneaters (1896), winning 16 career major league games against 17 losses. Nicknamed "Grasshopper," Mains had a lengthy career pitching minor league baseball, where he had a record of 318–179 in 545 career games.

C. L. Flatley bought the St. Paul franchise in September 1890 and contracted with Bill Watkins to return as manager and a minority part-owner in 1891. However, shortly after purchasing the team, Flatley sold the club in December 1890.

During the 1891 season St. Paul relocated while playing as members of eight-team Western Association. In June 1891, with St. Paul in financial difficulty, the franchise was sold and moved to Duluth, Minnesota. Playing under manager Bill Watkins, St. Paul had a record of 17-34 when the team moved to Duluth on June 8, 1891. After compiling a 22–27 record while based in Duluth, the team disbanded August on 20, 1891 with a 39–61 overall record. The Minneapolis and Lincoln teams disbanded the same day. This occurred just after the Milwaukee Brewers joined a new league on August 18, leaving the league with four teams. After the move to Duluth, when the team and the league disbanded, Bill Watkins inherited the financial responsibility for half of the Duluth team's unpaid player salaries.

The Western Association folded and did not reform in 1892 following the conclusion of the 1891 season.

=== 1892: First Western League season ===
Despite the franchise relocating in the previous season, St. Paul returned minor league play and joined a new league in 1892. The St. Paul Saints began the season as charter members of the Class A level Western League. St. Paul and the Kansas City Cowboys, Milwaukee Brewers, Minneapolis Minnies, Omaha Omahogs, franchises all moved from the Western Association to join the Western League. Those five teams joined with the Columbus Reds, Indianapolis Hoosiers and Toledo Black Pirates teams to form the newly formed eight-team league. The Western League began its first season of play with opening day games held on April 16, 1892. At a league meeting held on March 17, 1892, at the Auditorium Hotel in Chicago, team rosters were formed by drawing 96 player names out of the hat of league president Jimmy Williams, with no player exchanges allowed.

After beginning the season, the St. Paul Saints did not end the season in the league, beginning a tumultuous series of events for the fledgling league. During the first Western League season the St. Paul franchise relocated to Ft. Wayne, Indiana on May 25, 1892. After obtaining a team Ft. Wayne folded along with the Milwaukee Brewers on July 7, 1892. Shortly after, the first place Columbus Reds and Minneapolis Minnies teams both disbanded July 15. With these events, the Western League folded July 17, 1982.

In the final 1892 Western League standings of the shortened season, St. Paul/Ft. Wayne ended the season in third place in the 10-team league, finishing 5.5 gamed behind the first place Kansas City Cowboys. The St. Paul/Ft. Wayne ended the season with a 20–31 record, playing the season under managers Andrew Thompson and Billy Alvord in the two locations. Outfielder Scrappy Carroll returned to St. Paul and hit 16 home runs to lead the Western League.

St. Paul did not return to minor league play in 1893, as The Western League did not reform for the season.

=== 1895: St. Paul Saints' Comiskey era begins ===
On November 20, 1893, at a meeting in Indianapolis, Indiana, the Western League was reformed. Baseball Hall of Fame member Ban Johnson was named president of the league, beginning a tenure of leadership that saw the league evolve into a major league, eventually becoming the 1900 American League. Cincinnati, Ohio, where Johnson was based as the sports editor for a newspaper, was selected as the league headquarters before the league reversed course and became based in Chicago, Illinois. Johnson had been selected as league president strengthened by a recommendation of his colleague Charles Comiskey, who had been a star player for the St. Louis Browns before beginning a tenure managing the Cincinnati Reds. After the 1894 season, Comiskey left the Reds and bought a Sioux City, Iowa team and transferred it to Saint Paul, Minnesota. The relationship between Comiskey and Johnson was foundation of the American League.

The Detroit Creams, Grand Rapids Rippers, Indianapolis Hoosiers, Kansas City Blues, Milwaukee Brewers, Minneapolis Millers, Sioux City Cornhuskers and Toledo White Stockings teams were the members of the 1894 Class A level Western League.

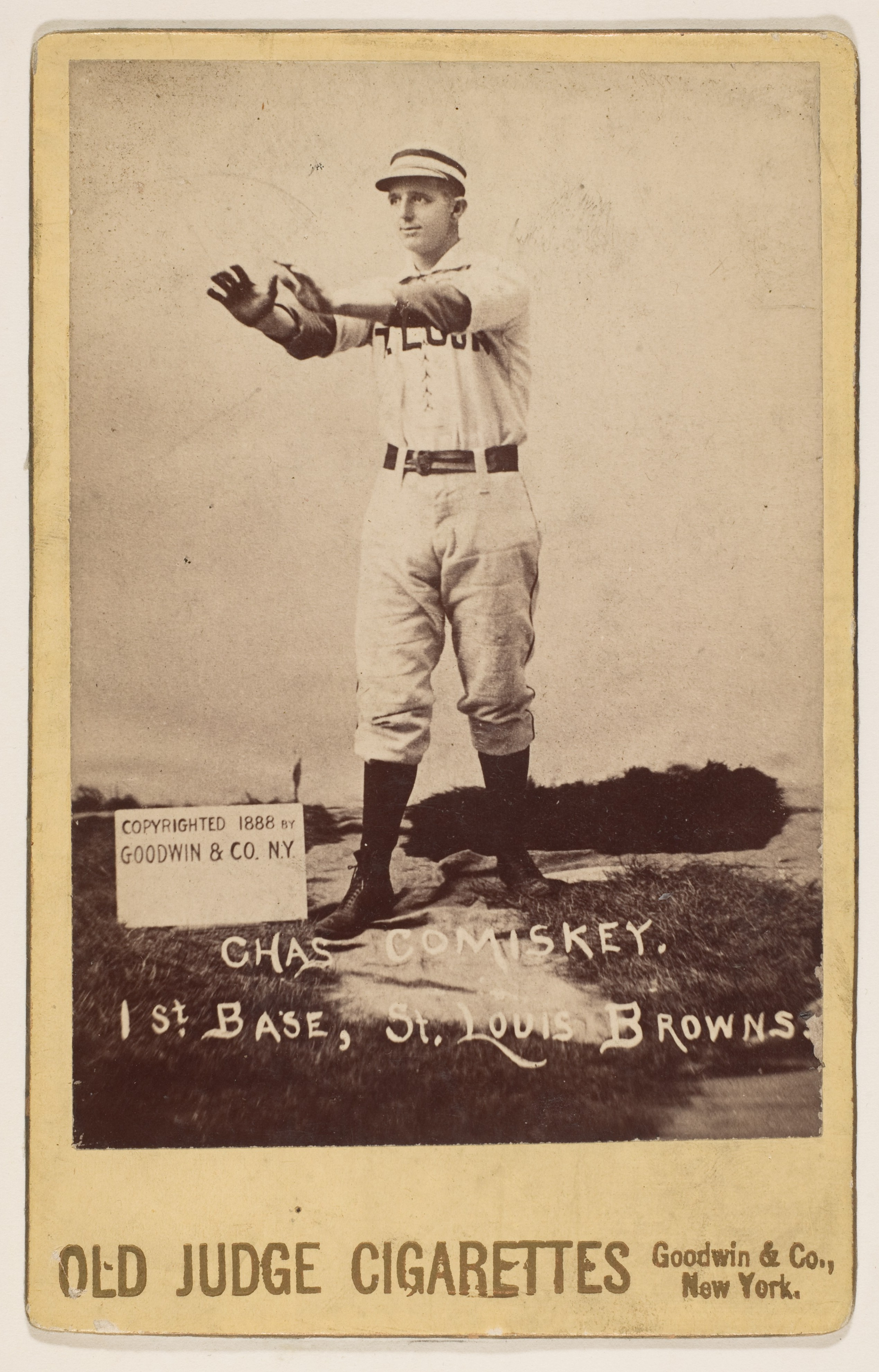
(1888) Baseball Hall of Fame member Charles Comiskey, St. Louis Browns baseball card. Following his major league playing and managerial career, Comiskey bought the St. Paul franchise in 1895. Comiskey moved the team to become the Chicago White Sox in 1900.

After his tenure as manager with the Cincinnati Reds ended following the 1894 season, Charles Comiskey bought the Sioux City Cornhuskers franchise and then moved the franchise to St. Paul, Minnesota for the 1895 Western League season. Sioux City had just won the championship of the 1894 Western League under manager Bill Watkins and were the defending league champions.

Based in St. Paul, the team became known again as the St. Paul Saints.

A Chicago, Illinois, native and the son of politician John Comiskey, Comiskey started his baseball playing career as a pitcher before moving first base after developing arm trouble. He began his major league career with the 1882 American Association member St. Louis Brown Stockings. He served as the player/manager for St. Louis during parts of its first three seasons and became the full-time manager in 1885. He led the Browns to four consecutive American Association championships and a close second in 1889. He also played and managed for the Chicago Pirates in the Players' League (1890), the Browns again (1891), and the Cincinnati Reds in the National League (1892–1894) prior to his tenure in St. Paul.

The Saints joined with the Detroit Tigers, Grand Rapids Gold Bugs, Indianapolis Hoosiers, Kansas City Blues, Milwaukee Brewers, Minneapolis Millers and Toledo Swamp Angels teams in forming the 1895 Western League. The seven other league members all returned from the 1894 league. The Western League began the season schedule with opening day games on May 1, 1895. St. Paul's paring with the Minneapolis Millers gave the Twin Cities two teams in the Western League.

On opening day May 7, 1895, the Saints and the Milwaukee Brewers faced each other in St. Paul beginning 1895 Western League play. Players from both teams paraded around the city riding in trolley cars, with a marching band as part of the parade. The pregame parade ended at the Dale and Aurora Grounds ballpark. Despite a rain delay in the third inning, attendance was 3,000, and the Saints defeated Milwaukee 18 to 4 to win their first game as members of the league.

St> Paul ended the season with a record of 74–50, earning a second-place finish under manager and team owner Charles Comiskey. With their second-place finish, the Saints ended the season 5½ games behind the first place Indianapolis Hoosiers, who were managed by Bill Watkins. No playoffs were held. Pitcher Tony Mullane of St. Paul compiled a 2.30 ERA to lead the league. Bill George, who split the season between Grand Rapids and St. Paul had 241 hits to lead the league. At age 35, Comiskey played in 17 games and batted .343 playing at first base in his appearances for the Saints.

A former major league pitcher Scott Stratton played in 43 games as an outfielder for St. Paul in 1895, batting .381 with 10 stolen bases at age 25. Stratton began the season pitching with the Chicago Colts, where he had a 9.60 ERA in 5 games with Chicago and was released following his final major league game on July 2, 1895, when he gave up 11 runs in the first inning to the St. Louis Browns. Stratton had compiled a major league record of 97–114 with a 3.87 ERA pitching for the Louisville Colonels (1888–1891), Pittsburgh Pirates (1891), Louisville Colonels (1892–1894) and Chicago Colts (1894–1895). In 1890, pitching for Louisville, Stratton had a 34–14 and 2.36 ERA while pitching 431 innings. Stratton was a Sabbatarian and refused to play in baseball games held on Sundays.

==== 1896 to 1899: St. Paul Saints / Western League ====
After joining the league the season prior, the 1896 Saint Paul Saints continued Western League play under manager Charles Comiskey. The Saints ended the season in fourth place. With a record of 73–63 record under manager Comiskey in the eight-team Western League, St. Paul ended the season 16.0 games behind the first place Minneapolis Millers in the final standings. Saints pitcher Roger Denzer had 200 strikeouts.

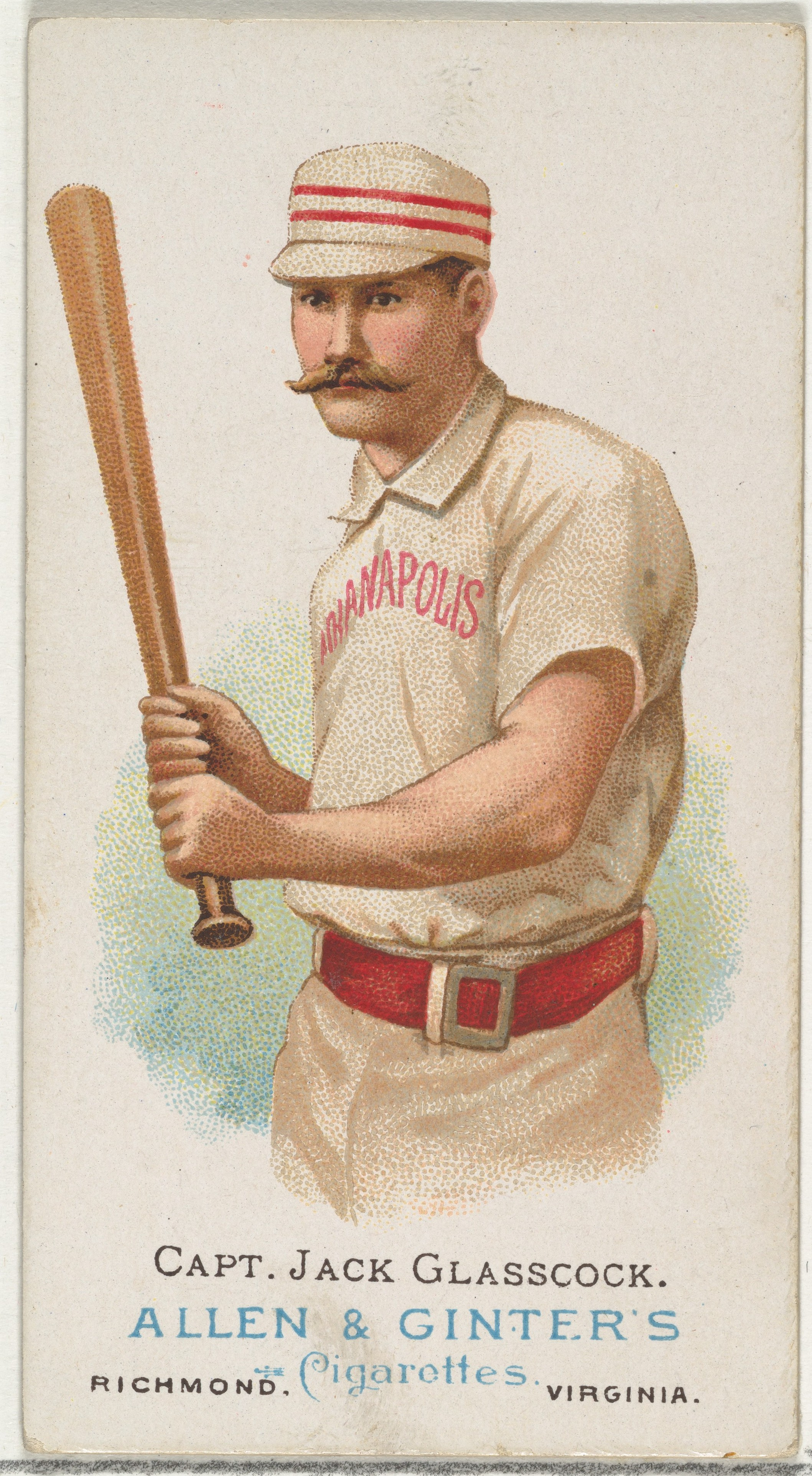
(1887) Jack Glasscock, Indianapolis Hoosiers. Allen & Ginter Cigarettes, baseball card. Glasscock batted .431 for St. Paul in 1896, at age 38, his first of three seasons with the team.

Shortstop Jack Glasscock had an amazing season for St. Paul in 1896. At age 38, Glasscock batted.431 with 263 hits while also scoring 172 runs for the Saints. Glasscock joined St. Paul after playing with the Washington Senators in 1895, his final major league season of a 17-year major league career. Glasscock won the 1890 batting title with a .336 average for the New York Giants and led the major leagues in hits twice. He was the sixth major league player to have 2,000 career hits. He ended his career with major league records for games played (1,628), putouts (2,821), assists (5,630), total chances (9,283), double plays (620) and fielding percentage (.910) at shortstop and ranked fifth in major league history in games with 1,736. Glasscock has been credited as the creator of the term Charley horse.

St. Paul continued play in the 1897 eight-team Class A level Western League. A new ballpark opened for the St. Paul Saints, built privately by Comiskey. Lexington Park would subsequently host minor league teams in the city through 1956. The Saints had a third-place finish playing the season in their new ballpark and finished one place of ahead of the Milwaukee Brewers, who were managed by the legendary Connie Mack. St. Paul had a final record of 86–51 to garner their third-place finish under Comiskey. The Indianapolis Indians won the league championship and finished 13.0 games ahead of St. Paul. St. Paul's centerfielder Algie McBride won the batting title batting .387 and scored a league leading 166 runs. McBride's Saints' outfield teammate Bill George had a league leading 207 hits while batting .338 with 10 home runs. George played with the Saints at age 32, having begun his professional career in the major leagues a decade earlier, pitching with the New York Giants and winning 5 games in three partial seasons.

Algie McBride's contract had been sold to St. Paul by the Chicago Colts prior to the 1897 season. McBride played briefly with Chicago in the 1896 season. On September 25, 1897, McBride was signed by the Cincinnati Reds and he went on hit .302 in 486 at bats for the Reds n 1898. In 1899, McBride batted .342 for Cincinnati.

St. Paul played their fifth season as a member of the Western League in 1898. In the eight-team league, the Saints ended the season in fourth place, finishing with a record of 81–58 record under manager and owner Charles Comiskey. St. Paul finished 7.0 games behind the first place Kansas City Blues as the Western League held no playoffs. Former major league shortstop Frank Shugart led the league with 12 home runs on the season, playing 134 games at shortstop for the Saints. Shugart would remain with the franchise through 1900.

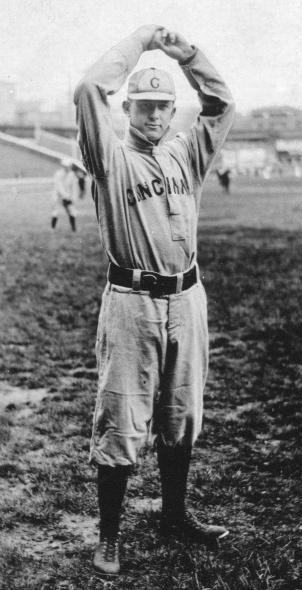
(1899) Noodles Hahn, Cincinnati Reds. Hahn pitched for St. Paul in 1898.

At age 19, Noodles Hahn pitched a portion of the season for St. Paul in 1898, being acquired from the Detroit Tigers during the season. Hahn would advance to have a quality pitching career In his major league career Hahn had a career record of 130–94, with an ERA of 2.55. He pitched for the Cincinnati Reds (1899–1905) and New York Highlanders (1906) and is a member of the Cincinnati Reds Hall of Fame. After his career was shortened due to arm injuries, Hahn became a veterinary surgeon and worked as a government meat inspector in Cincinnati. Living in Cincinnati, Hahn worked out with the Cincinnati Reds on home game days until he was in his early 70's. In his informal coaching tenure, Hahn worked with the Cincinnati players, but was reluctant to discuss his own successful career without prodding.

The 1899 season was the final Western League season before the league transformed from a Class A level minor league to a major league. The St. Paul Saints ended their final Western League season with a 57–69 record. The Saints finished the season in fifth place under manager Charles Comiskey. The Saints ended the season 20.0 games behind the first place Indianapolis Hoosiers.

Catcher Farmer Vaughn played for St. Paul in 1899 at ae 35, joining the team for the final month of the season after beginning the season with the Cincinnati Reds. Vaughn played 13seasons in the major leagues for the Cincinnati Red Stockings (1886), Louisville Colonels (1888–1890), New York Giants (1890), Cincinnati Kelly's Killers (1891), Milwaukee Brewers (1891) and Cincinnati Reds (1892–1899). Vaughn had a career .274 batting average, with 21 home runs and 525 RBIs in 915 career games.

Following the 1899 season, his fourth with St. Paul, Frank Shugart remained with the franchise as it became the Chicago White Stockings. Shugart played with St. Paul after beginning his major league career playing with the Chicago Pirates (1890), Pittsburgh Pirates (1891–1893) St. Louis Browns (1893–1894), and Louisville Colonels (1895), playing in 745 career games and batting .267. An incident on August 21, 1901, in which he punched an umpire in the face, ended Shugart's major league career. In a game against the Washington Senators while playing for the Chicago, Shugart argued with umpire Jack Haskell. After Shugart continued to argue, delaying the game, Haskell had pulled out his watch to give Shugart and gave Haskell one minute to get leave the field. Shugart attempted to grab Haskell's watch away from him in retaliation. In that moment, Shugart's teammate Joe Sugden shoved Haskell, and while Haskell was off-balance, Shugart punched him in the face. After being punched, Haskell held Shugart in a headlock as police, players, and even spectators intervened. Shugart was arrested by police, jailed overnight and was fined. On August 23, 1890, American League founder and president Ban Johnson banned Shugart from the American League for life, stating "I have expelled Shugart from the league for life for assaulting Umpire Haskell. No slugging will be permitted in this league in the future while I am president of it, and each man who commits that offense will be expelled forthwith. That is final." Shugart never played in the major leagues again.

=== 1900: New leagues established without St. Paul ===
After five seasons of having two Twin Cities teams in the Western League, sharing the market with the Minneapolis Millers, Comiskey moved the team to his hometown and established a second team in Chicago, along with the National League, Chicago Cubs franchise. On March 21, 1900, Comiskey officially moved the St. Paul Saints, to become the Chicago White Sox.

In 1900, the Western League changed its name to the American League in an attempt to get major league status under president Ban Johnson. This was unsuccessful and the newly named American League played the 1900 season as a minor league. In 1900, with the approval of Western League president Ban Johnson and without resistance from the National League, Charles Comiskey moved the St. Paul Saints into his hometown neighborhood of Armour Square, where they became the Chicago White Stockings and played in the American League. The White Stockings won the 1900 American League pennant led by player-manager Dick Padden, as the league played a final season as a minor league.

The Chicago White Stockings became one of the American League's eight charter franchises when the league gained major league status in 1901.

A new Western League formed as a Class B league in 1900 without a St. Paul team. Charter members of the new Western League were the Denver Grizzlies, Des Moines Hawkeyes, Omaha Omahogs, Pueblo Indians, a new Sioux City Cornhuskers team and the St. Joseph Saints.

=== 1901: Saints reform & rejoin New Western League ===
In 1901, the St. Paul Saints reformed and played their final season in the Class A level Western League. The League continued play as the Pueblo Indians and Sioux City Cornhuskers folded and the Colorado Springs Millionaires and St. Paul Saints, formed and joined the League. The Kansas City Blues and Minneapolis Millers teams moved from the American League after those franchises were removed from the league in transition of becoming a major league.

Playing in the newly reformed Western League, St. Paul fielded a strong team. Finishing with a record of 69–54, the Saints ended the season in second place, led by manager Jimmy Ryan. The Saints ended up 5.0 games behind the first place Kansas City Blues in the final standings.

Following his season as player-manager of the Saints, Jimmy Ryan played in 1902 and 1903 for the Washington Senators in the final seasons of his major league career. Ryan played with the Chicago White Stockings (1885–1889), Chicago Pirates (1890), Chicago Colts / Orphans (1891–1900), and Washington Senators (1902–1903). A centerfielder, Ryan batted .308, with 2,518 career hits, 118 home runs and 1.098 career RBI's. Ryan also pitched in 24 games early in his major league career, compiling a 6–1 record with 2 saves, a 3.62 ERA in 117 innings pitched. Feisty by nature, Ryan was noted to have punched newspaper reporters on multiple occasions during his career and once punched a train conductor. Ryan is a member of the Chicago Cubs Hall of Fame.

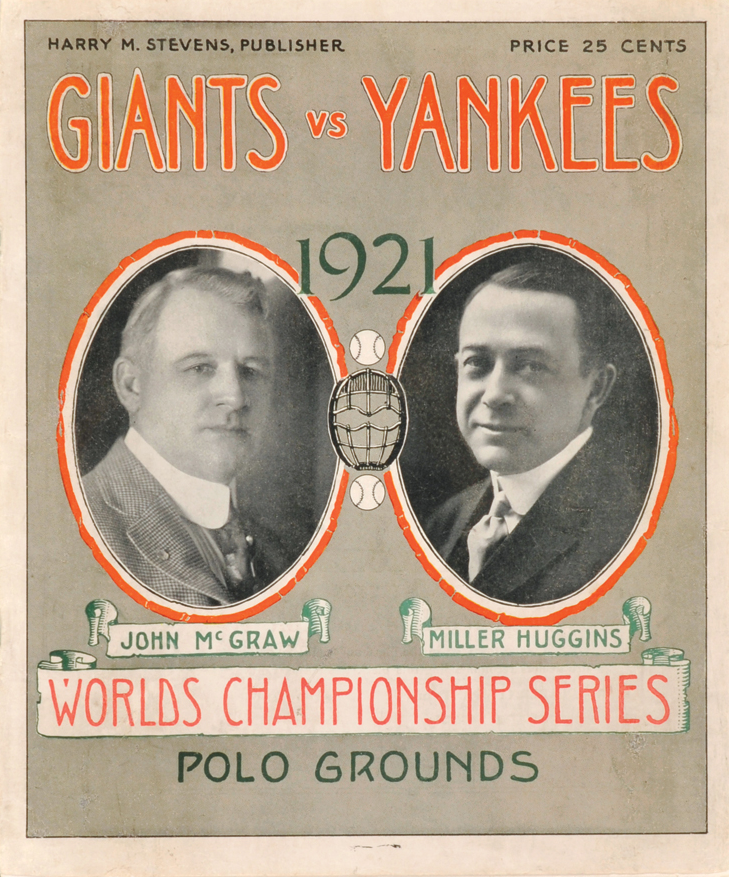
1921 World Series program. Miller Huggins began his professional baseball career with St. Paul in 1901.

Baseball Hall of Fame member Miller Huggins played for St. Paul in 1901 in his first professional season, batting .210 in 71 games as a second baseman. Huggins managed the Yankees following his 13-year major league playing career in which he served as the player-manager for the St. Louis Cardinals from 1913 to 1917. Huggins then mananaged the New York Yankees from 1918 to 1929, during which the Yankees won five American League pennants and three World Series championships with Babe Ruth, Lou Gehrig and Waite Hoyt on the roster during his tenure.

Infielder Germany Schaefer played for the Saints in 1901 before making his major league debut with the Chicago Orphans at the end of the season. Schaeffer played 15 seasons with the Chicago Cubs (1901–1902), Detroit Tigers (1905–1909), Washington Senators (1909–1914), Newark Pepper (1915), New York Yankees (1916) and Cleveland Indians (1918). In 1,150 career major league games, Schaefer batted .257 with 9 home runs and 201 stolen bases. Schaefer became known for his good-natured clowning and creative baserunning plays during his major league career.

St. Paul left the Western League following the 1901 season and the St Paul Saints continued minor league play in 1902 as members of the newly formed American Association. The 1902 St, Paul Saints began a lengthy tenure of membership in the American Association that lasted through the 1960 season.

Today, the modern St. Paul Saints franchise continues minor league play under the historic nickname. Formed in 1993, the Saints play as members of the Class AAA level International League as the top minor league affiliate of the Minnesota Twins.

== The ballparks ==
(1886) Train directions for "St. Paul baseball grounds" West Seventh Street Park (II). April 8, 1886 St. Paul Globe.

From 1884 to 1892, St. Paul hosted games at West Seventh Street Park. The ballpark was located at Erie Street between St. Clair Avenue & Grace Street in St. Paul. Today, the St. Clair Playground park borders the site.

In the same period, St. Paul also hosted home games at the Dale and Aurora Grounds due to Sunday Laws in the era. The ballpark was also nicknamed as "Comiskey Park" after the team owner and manager Charles Comiskey. The ballpark was located in a parcel located at Aurora & Fuller Streets between St. Albans Street North & Dale Street North in St. Paul.

St. Paul hosted home games at Lexington Park beginning in 1897. Charles Comiskey had the ballpark privately built for the team and he retained ownership. Edward B. Smith, a Buffalo, New York based businessman invested $75,000 of his own money into the ballpark construction. Following the team's move to Chicago in 1901, Comiskey remained as the owner of the ballpark through 1920. The ballpark remained in use for St. Paul minor league teams and other uses though 1956. Today, the site contains both commercial and residential parcels. In the era, the ballpark was located on the city block bordered by Lexington Parkway, University Avenue, Fuller Avenue and North Dunlap Street in St. Paul.

When Sunday laws became an issue, team owner Charles Comiskey also arranged for the Saints to host select Sunday games at the Minnehaha Driving Grounds in Minneapolis, Minnesota.

== Timeline ==
Year(s)	# Yrs.	Team	Level	League	Ballpark
1877	1	St. Paul Red Caps	Independent	League Alliance	West Seventh Street Park
1884 (1)	1	St. Paul Apostles	Independent	Northwestern League	West Seventh Street Park
1884 (2)	.5	St. Paul Saints	Major League	Union Association	West Seventh Street Park
1886	1	St. Paul Freezers	Independent	Northwestern League	West Seventh Street Park
1887	1	St. Paul Saints	Independent	Northwestern League	West Seventh Street Park
1888–1891	4	St. Paul Apostles	Independent	Western Association	Dale and Aurora Grounds
1892	1	St. Paul Saints	Class A	Western League	Dale and Aurora Grounds
1895–1896	2	St. Paul Saints	Class A	Western League	Dale and Aurora Grounds
1897–1899	3	St. Paul Saints	Class A	Western League	Lexington Park
1901	1	St. Paul Saints	Class A	Western League II	Lexington Park

== Year-by-year records ==
Year	Record	Finish	Manager	Playoffs / notes
1884	24–48	9th	Lem Hunter / Andrew Thompson	Joined Union Association Sept 27
1887	75–45	3rd	John Barnes	No playoffs held
1888	61–38	3rd	Andrew Thompson / John Barnes	No playoffs held
1889	74–46	2nd	Andrew Thompson / John Barnes	No playoffs held
1890	37–84	8th	Andrew Thompson / Bill Watkins	No playoffs held
1891	39–61	5th	Bill Watkins	Team (17–34) moved to Duluth June 8
1892	20–31	--	Andrew Thompson / Billy Alvord	St. Paul moved to Fort Wayne May 25; Ft. Wayne folded July 7 League folded July 17
1895	74–50	2nd	Charles Comiskey	No playoffs held
1896	73–63	4th	Charles Comiskey	No playoffs held
1897	86–51	3rd	Charles Comiskey	No playoffs held
1898	81–58	4th	Charles Comiskey	No playoffs held
1899	57–69	5th	Charles Comiskey	No playoffs held
1901	69–54	2nd	Jimmy Ryan	No playoffs held

== Notable alumni ==
- Charles Comiskey (1895–1899, MGR), inducted Baseball Hall of Fame, 1941
- Miller Huggins (1901–1902), inducted Baseball Hall of Fame, 1964
- Charlie Abbey (1890–1891)
- Art Allison (1877)
- Billy Alvord (1892, MGR)
- Varney Anderson (1888)
- Harry Arundel (1884)
- Kid Baldwin (1891)
- Art Ball (1899)
- Bill Barnes (1884)
- John Barnes (1887, MGR)
- Billy Barnie (1892)
- Charlie Bartson (1891)
- George Bausewine (1890)
- Tun Berger (1895)
- Eddie Boyle (1895)
- Dave Brain (1901)
- Ted Breitenstein (1901)
- Cal Broughton (1888–1890)
- Ed Brown (1884)
- Bob Brush (1897)
- Tod Brynan (1888)
- Ernie Burch (1887)
- Eddie Burke (1897, 1899)
- Jim Burns (1895–1896)
- Ike Butler (1896)
- Lew Camp (1895)
- Count Campau (1898)
- Joe Cantillon (1890)
- Fred Carisch (1901)
- Bill Carney (1897)
- Scrappy Carroll (1884, 1888–1889)
- Charlie Chech (1901)
- John Clapp (1884)
- Josh Clarke (1899)
- Dad Clarkson (1890)
- Elmer Cleveland (1887)
- Monk Cline (1890)
- Dick Cogan (1901)
- Bill Collins (1892)
- Jack Crooks (1887, 1901)
- Lem Cross (1897–1898)
- Bert Cunningham (1892, 1901)
- Doc Curley (1901)
- Sun Daly (1889–1890)
- Pat Dealy (1884)
- Dory Dean (1877)
- George Decker (1899)
- Roger Denzer (1895–1899)
- Pat Dillard (1901)
- Alexander Donoghue (1892)
- Dan Dugdale (1892)
- Steve Dunn (1884)
- Jesse Duryea (1887–1888, 1896)
- Al Dwight (1884)
- Billy Earle (1888)
- Joe Ellick (1877)
- Bones Ely (1891)
- Bill Farmer (1889–1890)
- Chauncey Fisher (1899)
- Will Foley (1884)
- Elmer Foster (1884)
- Charlie Frank (1899)
- Ralph Frary (1889)
- Lou Galvin (1884)
- Charlie Ganzel (1884)
- Hank Gehring (1901)
- Phil Geier (1898–1899)
- Bill George (1895–1897)
- Sam Gillen (1897–1898)
- Jack Glasscock (1896–1898)
- Bob Glenalvin (1898–1899)
- Bill Goodenough (1891)
- Jack Gorman (1884)
- Frank Graves (1884)
- Emil Gross (1877)
- Noodles Hahn (1898) Cincinnati Reds Hall of Fame
- Charlie Hamburg (1891)
- Billy Hart (1891)
- Jimmy Hart (1899)
- Pat Hartnett (1890)
- Bill Hawes (1889–1890)
- Moxie Hengel (1884)
- Harry Hinchman (1880
- Jesse Hoffmeister (1899)
- George Hogreiver (1892)
- Will Holland (1892))
- Ed Holly (1901)
- Fred Holmes (1901)
- Lefty Houtz (1899)
- Lem Hunter (1884, MGR)
- Bert Inks (1891, 1896)
- Charlie Irwin (1895)
- Frank Isbell (1896–1899)
- Alex Jones (1895)
- Bumpus Jones (1901)
- Jack Katoll (1899)
- George Keefe (1892)
- Mike Kelley (1901)
- Nate Kellogg (1887)
- Rudy Kemmler (1887–1888)
- Henry Killeen (1895)
- John Kirby (1888)
- Bill Kling (1890)
- Charlie Knepper (1901)
- Sam LaRocque (1891)
- Dan Lally (1899)
- Tacks Latimer (1901)
- Willard Mains (1889–1890)
- Lefty Marr (1895)
- Algie McBride (1897)
- Al McCauley (1887)
- Bill McClellan (1877)
- Willie McGill (1896–1897, 1899, 1901)
- Tom McLaughlin (1890)
- Jack McMahon (1890–1891)
- Jouett Meekin (1889–1891)
- Sam Mertes (1896)
- Doggie Miller (1898)
- Joe Miller (1877)
- Joe Miller (1891)
- Tom Morrissey (18808)
- Frank Motz (1892)
- Tony Mullane (1895–1898)
- Clarence Murphy (1887)
- Larry Murphy (1888–1890)
- Sam Nicholl (1897)
- Parson Nicholson (1897)
- Charlie Nyce (1897)
- Billy O'Brien (1884)
- Jack O'Brien (1891)
- Pete O'Brien (1890)
- Tim O'Rourke (1891, 1895–1897)
- Franklin W. Olin (1884)
- Fred Osborne (1891)
- Jay Parker (1901)
- Tom Parrott (1897)
- Roy Patterson (1899)
- Harrison Peppers (1895)
- Bill Phyle (1895–1898)
- John Pickett (1887–1889, 1895–1896)
- Walt Preston (1897–1899)
- Charlie Reilly (1888–1889)
- Frank Ringo (1888)
- Lew Ritter (1898–1899)
- Jimmy Ryan (1901, MGR) Chicago Cubs Hall of Fame
- Harry Salisbury (1877)
- Crazy Schmit (1890–1891)
- Germany Schaefer (1901)
- Taylor Shafer (1888)
- Spike Shannon (1901)
- Lev Shreve (1890)
- Frank Shugart (1896–1899)
- Ollie Smith (1895)
- Pop Smith (1892)
- Bill Sowders (1887)
- John Sowders (1888–1889)
- Harry Spies (1896–1899)
- Charlie Sprague (1891)
- Scott Stratton (1895–1896)
- Len Stockwell (1887)
- Sy Sutcliffe (1892)
- Pete Sweeney (1890)
- Tom Thomas (1901)
- Andrew Thompson (1884–1892, MGR)
- John Tilly (1884)
- George Treadway (1889)
- Tuck Turner (1896)
- Larry Twitchell (1896)
- Fred Underwood (1890)
- Bill Van Dyke (1895)
- Farmer Vaughn (1899)
- Peek-A-Boo Veach (1888)
- Lee Viau (1887)
- Jack Wadsworth (1892)
- Woody Wagenhorst (1889)
- Oscar Walker (1877)
- Bill Watkins (1890–1891, MGR)
- Perry Werden (1901)
- Joe Werrick (1884, 1889–1890)
- Milt Whitehead (1891)
- Otto Williams (1901)
- Walt Wilmot (1887)
- Bill Wilson (1901)
- Charles Witherow (1877)
- Bob Wood (1895)
- Rasty Wright (1891)
- Charlie Ziegler (1901)

== See also ==
- St. Paul Saints (Northwestern League) players
- St. Paul Saints (Western League) players
- St. Paul Red Caps players
- St. Paul Apostles players
- St. Paul Freezers players

== See also ==
- List of baseball parks in Minneapolis–Saint Paul, Minnesota
