= Duluth Freezers =

- 1887; (1886–1887, 1891); Duluth, Minnesota

Minor league affiliations
- Class: Independent (1886–1887)
- League: Northwestern League (1886–1887); Western Association (1891)

Major league affiliations
- Team: None

Minor league titles
- League titles (1): 1886

Team data
- Name: Duluth Jayhawks (1886); Duluth Freezers (1887); Duluth Whalebacks (1891)
- Ballpark: Unknown (1886–1887, 1891)

The Duluth Freezers were a minor league baseball team based in Duluth, Minnesota. In 1886 Duluth began minor league baseball play as members of the Independent level Northwestern League, playing as the "Jayhawks" in 1886 and the "Freezers" in 1887. Duluth won the league championship in 1886. For a partial season in 1891, the Duluth "Whalebacks" played as members of the Western Association.

In 1887, three Duluth players were involved in a boating accident that resulted in the death of John Ake.

== History ==
=== 1886 & 1887 Northwestern League ===
In 1886, Duluth began minor league play when the Duluth "Jayhawks" became members of the six-team Independent level Northwestern League, which had reformed after not playing in 1885. The Eau Claire Lumbermen, Milwaukee Brewers, Minneapolis Millers, Oshkosh, and St. Paul Freezers teams joined Duluth in beginning league play on May 6, 1886.

On June 18, 1886, Duluth pitcher Mark Baldwin struck out 18 batters in a contest against the St. Paul Freezers. This included 12 consecutive strikeouts for Baldwin. On October 20, 1886, after Duluth had completed their season, Chicago White Stockings president Albert Spalding signed Baldwin to a contract to replace the injured Jocko Flynn on Chicago's roster. Chicago wanted to add Baldwin to their roster for the 1886 World Series (which was scheduled from October 18 to October 23), but the St. Louis Browns objected, so Baldwin never played in the series.

Playing their first minor league season, the Duluth Jayhawks won the Northwestern League championship. Duluth ended the 1886 season in first place in the final standings, playing under manager William Lucas. With a record of 46–33, Duluth finished 1.5 games ahead of the second place Eau Claire Lumbermen when the Northwestern League season schedule ended on September 30, 1886. The league held no playoffs.

Overall, Duluth (46–33) finished ahead of the Eau Claire Lumbermen (43–36), Oshkosh (39–39), St, Paul Freezers (37–43), Minneapolis Millers (36–42) and Milwaukee Brewers (35–43) teams in capturing the 1886 Northwestern League championship.

Continuing play in the Northwestern League, the 1887, Duluth team was referred to as the 'Freezers" and played under returning manager William Lucas, Joe Quinn and Jay Anderson. Lucas had suffered a broken leg which was slow to heal and he needed help at managing. Defending their league championship, Duluth ended the season in seventh place. With a final record of 42–76, Duluth ended the season 22.0 games behind first place Oshkosh. The Northwestern League did not return to play in 1887.

=== 1887 Ake death ===
Om May 11, 1887, after playing a game in La Crosse, Wisconsin, a boating accident on the Mississippi River claimed the life of Duluth player John Ake. Ake and Duluth teammates Billy Earle and Bill Barnes were on a boat that capsized. Acke, Barnes, and Earle were paddling in a rowboat on the river near Barron's Island. Just after 8 pm, with the three teammates 200 yards from the shore, a passing steamboat created a wake and overturned their boat, leaving the three clinging to it. Barnes and Earle were eventually able to swim to shore; Ake did not know how to swim, and hoisted himself onto the overturned boat. Ake then attempted to swim the shore before Barnes and Earle could secure a rescue skiff, but after a couple strokes, Acke began to shout for help before slipping under the water.

=== 1891 Western Association ===
In 1891, the Duluth "Whalebacks" played a partial season as members of the eight-team Western Association; on June 16, the St. Paul Apostles, with a record of 17–34, moved to Duluth. After compiling a 22–27 record while based in Duluth, the St. Paul Apostles/Duluth Whalebacks ended the 1891 season with an overall record of 39–61, placing fifth in the Western Association. Bill Watkins and the returning Jay Anderson served as managers. The team finished in fifth place after the Lincoln Rustlers and Minneapolis Millers folded during the season and the Milwaukee Brewers left the league in August to join the American Association. The Sioux City Cornhuskers won the league title with a 66–57 record, finishing 13.5 games ahead of Duluth. The Denver Mountaineers, Kansas City Blues and Omaha Lambs teams also played with Duluth in the league. The Western Association did not return to play in 1892.

Duluth next hosted minor league play in 1902 when the Duluth Cardinals began the franchise's tenure as members of the Northern League.

Today, the amateur Duluth Huskies play collegiate summer baseball as members of the Northwoods League.

== The ballpark ==
The name of the Duluth home ballpark in the 1886, 1887 and 1891 seasons in unknown. In the era, Zenith Park was in use as a public park, having been established the 1870s as a 30-acre park known as "Central Park."

== Timeline ==
| Year(s) | # Yrs. | Team | Level | League |
|---|---|---|---|---|
| 1887 | 1 | Duluth Jayhwwaks | Independent | Northwestern League |
| 1888 | 1 | Duluth Freezers | Independent | Northwestern League |
| 1891 | 1 | Duluth Whalebacks | Independent | Western Association |

== Year–by–year records ==
| Year | Record | Finish | Manager | Playoffs/Notes |
|---|---|---|---|---|
| 1886 | 46–33 | 1st | William Lucas | League champions |
| 1887 | 42–76 | 7th | William Lucas / Joe Quinn; Jay Anderson | No playoffs held |
| 1891 | 39–61 | 5th | Bill Watkins / Jay Anderson | St. Paul (17–34) moved to Duluth June 16 |

== Notable alumni ==
- John Ake (1887)
- Mark Baldwin (1886)
- Jim Banning (1887)
- Kid Baldwin (1891)
- Bill Barnes (1887)
- Charlie Bartson (1891)
- George Bignell (1886)
- Tod Brynan (1887)
- Scrappy Carroll (1891)
- Billy Earle (1887)
- Bones Ely (1891)
- Bill Goodenough (1891)
- Charlie Hamburg (1891)
- Billy Hart (1891)
- Bill Hunter (1887)
- Charlie Ingraham (1887)
- Bert Inks (1891)
- Frank Jones (1886-1887)
- Henry Jones (1886)
- Nate Kellogg (1887)
- Rudy Kemmler (1887)
- Jack McMahon (1891)
- George McMillan (1886-1887)
- Joe Miller (1891)
- Jack O'Brien (1891)
- Tim O'Rourke (1891)
- Fred Osborne (1891)
- Elias Peak (1887)
- Billy Reid (1886)
- Joe Quinn (1887)
- Frank Scheibeck (1887)
- Crazy Schmit (1891)
- Tom Sexton (1887)
- Charlie Sprague (1891)
- Bill Stellberger (1887)
- Bill Traffley (1886)
- Milt Whitehead (1891)
- Rasty Wright (1891)
- Dick Van Zant (1886)

== See also ==
- Duluth Jayhawks players
- Duluth Freezers players
- Duluth Whalebacks players
