= John Ake =

American baseball player (1861–1887)

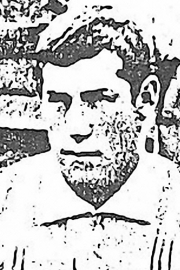
- Third baseman
- Born: August 29, 1861; Altoona, Pennsylvania, U.S.
- Died: May 11, 1887 (aged 25); La Crosse, Wisconsin, U.S.
- Batted: Right Threw: Right

MLB debut
- May 12, 1884, for the Baltimore Orioles (AA)

Last MLB appearance
- July 15, 1884, for the Baltimore Orioles (AA)

MLB statistics
- Batting average: .192
- Home runs: 0
- Runs batted in: 2
- Stats at Baseball Reference

Teams
- Baltimore Orioles (AA) (1884)

John Leckie Ake (August 29, 1861 – May 11, 1887) was an American Major League Baseball player who played as a third baseman for the 1884 Baltimore Orioles of the American Association (AA). Before and after his Major league career, he played for many professional minor league baseball teams from 1881 until his death in 1887. Described as a good and popular player, he died when the boat he was travelling in capsized in the Mississippi River, and not knowing how to swim, he drowned.

== Early life ==
Ake was born in Altoona, Pennsylvania on August 29, 1861 to William, a farmer, and his wife Anne. His family stayed in Altoona throughout his childhood, and Ake became a laborer later in his teen years.

== Baseball career ==
He began his professional baseball career in 1882 when he joined a club located in Altoona, having played for a local non-professional team the year before. He played for this professional club through the 1883 season, before signing a contract with the Baltimore Orioles of the American Association.

He made his debut with the Orioles on May 12, 1884, and made his final appearance on June 15. During his time with Baltimore, he played in 13 games, playing mostly as their third baseman, but played three games in the outfield, and one game at shortstop. He had a .192 batting average in 52 at bats, collected ten hits, one triple, and scored one run. After leaving the Orioles, he finished the year playing for a team in Fort Smith, Ohio. The following season, he played for a team in Youngstown, Ohio, followed by a team Meriden, Connecticut for the 1886 season. Later in 1886, he transferred to the Boston Blues when they bought out the Meriden team. After the season, he signed with a St. Louis, Missouri team, which was later moved to Indianapolis. He secured his release from the club shortly thereafter so he could sign with the Duluth, Minnesota based Duluth Freezers club.

== Death ==
On May 11, 1887, he and two of his Duluth teammates, Bill Barnes and Billy Earle, were paddling in a rowboat on the Mississippi River near La Crosse, Wisconsin, and Barron's Island. It was just after 8 pm, and the trio were approximately 200 yards from the shore, when a passing steamer overturned their boat with its wake, leaving the three clinging to the boat for some time. Barnes and Earle quickly swam to shore, but Ake, who did not know how to swim, hoisted himself on the overturned boat. Ake decided to attempt to swim ashore before Barnes and Earle could secure a rescue skiff, but after a couple strokes, he began to shout for help, slipping under the water, and drowned. Barnes later recalled the way Earle looked at Ake during the incident. Earle, sometimes described as a "weirdo", as "creepy", and as having an "evil eye", had an expression that Barnes never forgot.

A thorough search for his body was conducted into the evening, but it was called off. It was thought that since the water was high, the chances of recovering his remains were slim, and it was best to wait until they surfaced later. His widowed mother asked that if his body was recovered, that his remains be delivered to Altoona. On June 4, 1887, fishermen discovered his body when their hooks snagged onto his clothes. Due to the condition of his remains, it was reported that he was immediately buried.
