= St. Paul Apostles =

St. Paul Apostles may refer to the following baseball teams, who were briefly called the Apostles:

- St. Paul Saints (1884–1900), an early minor league baseball team based in St. Paul, Minnesota
- St. Paul Saints (Union Association), a Major League Baseball which existed for the 1884 season only
- St. Paul Saints (1901–1960), minor league baseball team in the American Association based in St. Paul, Minnesota
