= Scrappy Carroll =

American baseball player (1860–1942)

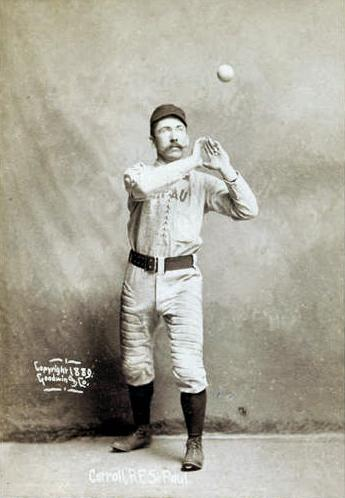
- Outfielder
- Born: August 27, 1860; Buffalo, New York, U.S.
- Died: November 14, 1942 (aged 82); Buffalo, New York, U.S.
- Batted: Right Threw: Unknown

MLB debut
- September 24, 1884, for the St. Paul White Caps

Last MLB appearance
- October 3, 1887, for the Cleveland Blues

MLB statistics
- Batting average: .171
- Home runs: 0
- Runs batted in: 20
- Stats at Baseball Reference

Teams
- St. Paul White Caps (1884); Buffalo Bisons (NL) (1885); Cleveland Blues (1887)

John E. "Scrappy" Carroll (August 27, 1860 – November 14, 1942) was an American outfielder in Major League Baseball. He played for the St. Paul White Caps, Buffalo Bisons, and Cleveland Blues during the 1880s. Carroll stood 5 feet 7 inches (1.70 m).

== Career ==
John E. Carroll was born in Buffalo, New York, in 1860. He was nicknamed "Scrappy", likely due to him having a "pugnacious disposition", and he may have been the first player to have had that nickname.

Carroll started his professional baseball career in 1884. He played for the St. Paul Apostles of the Northwestern League during that season and made his major league debut with the Union Association's St. Paul White Caps on September 27. The White Caps played a total of nine games, and Carroll appeared in all of them, mostly as a right fielder. He went 3 for 31 at the plate for a .097 batting average and made five errors in the field.

The Union Association disbanded after the 1884 season, and in 1885, Carroll played for three different teams: the Western League's Cleveland Forest Cities, the Southern League's Memphis Reds, and the National League's Buffalo Bisons. In his second major league trial, he played 13 games for the Bisons and went 3 for 40 (.075).

In 1886, Carroll played for the Utica Pent Ups of the International League. The following season, he received his final major league shot, with the American Association's Cleveland Blues. Carroll appeared in 57 games for the Blues and batted a career-high .199 with 19 runs batted in. He started in right field on August 3, which was Cleveland's first major league Sunday game. While playing for Cleveland, Carroll may have been the first major league player to wear sunglasses. According to an account of Cleveland's 1887 season, Carroll "caught the attention of the kranks at the ball park one sunny afternoon", when he wore "a pair of colored spectacles." Carroll played in his final major league game on October 3 and finished his MLB career with a .171 batting average in 79 games.

Carroll played for the Western Association's St. Paul Apostles in 1888 and 1889. In 1888, he batted .251 and led the team in at bats (494), runs (106), and total bases (205). He also hit 16 home runs, which led not only his team, but the entire league. Carroll also had 85 stolen bases in 1888.

In 1890, Carroll played for the Western Association's Minneapolis Millers. The following season, he split his time between six different teams in the Western Association, New England League, and Eastern Association. Carroll's last year in professional baseball was 1892. That season, he played 42 games for the Western League's Minneapolis Minnies, batting .237 with a team-leading 14 stolen bases.

Carroll died in his hometown of Buffalo, New York, in 1942. He was buried in Mount Olivet Cemetery.
