= West Seventh Street Park =

Baseball parks in Minnesota

Coordinates: 44.9315°N 93.1270°W

West Seventh Street Park was the name usually used for two different baseball parks in St. Paul, Minnesota. Other names sometimes used were Fort Street Grounds or Fort Road Grounds, that street name being a synonym for West Seventh Street due it being the main route from downtown St. Paul to Fort Snelling.

The 1884 ballpark was nominally the home field of the St. Paul entry in the one-year major league known as the Union Association, although the club played no home games during their short life in the UA.

== First ballpark ==
West Seventh Street Park (I) opened in 1884 as the home field of the St. Paul Apostles of the Northwestern League. The league struggled financially and had disbanded by early September. Later in the month, the Union Association was trying to fill out its schedule after some clubs had dropped out. The league brought in a couple of clubs from the defunct NWL: Milwaukee and St. Paul. The St. Paul Saints club's stay in the UA ran from September 27 through October 13. They had lost most of their NWL games, and that trend continued in the UA. Six of their nine games came against St. Louis and Cincinnati, the two winningest teams in the UA. St. Paul finished their UA session with a record of 2 wins, 6 losses, and 1 tied game. All of the club's UA games were played on the road.

The ballpark was on a block bounded by St. Clair Avenue (north); Duke Street (east); the Chicago Milwaukee & St. Paul Railroad and Grace Street (south); and Oneida Street (west). It was a short block northwest of the angling thoroughfare known as West Seventh Street or Fort Road.

== Second ballpark ==
West Seventh Street Park (II)

After a one-year hiatus, the Northwestern League tried again in 1886. The St. Paul Freezers entry built a new West Seventh Street Park (II) which served as their home field for the season. It was also sometimes referred to generically as St. Paul Grounds.

The ballpark was on a block bounded by Grace Street and the Chicago Milwaukee & St. Paul Railroad tracks (north); Toronto Street (east); Jefferson (now Palace) Avenue (south); and Warsaw (now Osceola) Avenue (west). It was a short block northwest of West Seventh Street, and two short blocks and across the tracks west of the first West Seventh Street Park site.

The NWL survived the 1886 season and played a second season in 1887. For that season, the St. Paul Saints moved to a new field in the "West Side" (the west bank of the Mississippi River). That move spelled the end of professional ball on West Seventh.
