= St. Paul Freezers =

- 1886; St. Paul, Minnesota

Minor league affiliations
- Class: Independent (1886)
- League: Northwestern League (1886)

Major league affiliations
- Team: None

Minor league titles
- League titles (0): None

Team data
- Name: St. Paul Freezers (1886)
- Ballpark: West Seventh Street Park (1886)

The St. Paul Freezers were a minor league baseball team based in St. Paul, Minnesota. In 1886, the "Freezers" played as members of the Independent level Northwestern League, placing fourth in the six-team league. The St. Paul Freezers hosted minor league home games at the West Seventh Street Park. The team became known as the "Freezers" after a cold spring forced early season games to be postponed.

== History ==
Organized baseball in St. Paul was reported in local newspapers as early as 1859. Minor league baseball in St. Paul began in 1877, when the St. Paul "Red Caps" joined the League Alliance, which organized numerous teams under some common opponents. The 1884 St. Paul Apostles of the Northwestern League preceded the St. Paul Freezers in minor league play.

The St. Paul "Freezers" nickname was given to the team by local reporters after cold spring temperatures in 1886 caused the cancellation of some St. Paul games.

In 1886, the St. Paul "Freezers" began play as members of the six-team Independent level Northwestern League, which had reformed after not playing in 1885. The Duluth Jayhawks, Eau Claire Lumbermen, Milwaukee Brewers, Minneapolis Millers and Oshkosh teams joined St. Paul in beginning league play on May 6, 1886.

Playing the season under manager John Barnes, the Freezers ended the 1886 season in fourth place. With a record of 37–43, the Freezers finished 9.5 games behind the champion Duluth Jayhawks when the Northwestern League season schedule ended on September 30, 1886. The league held no playoffs.

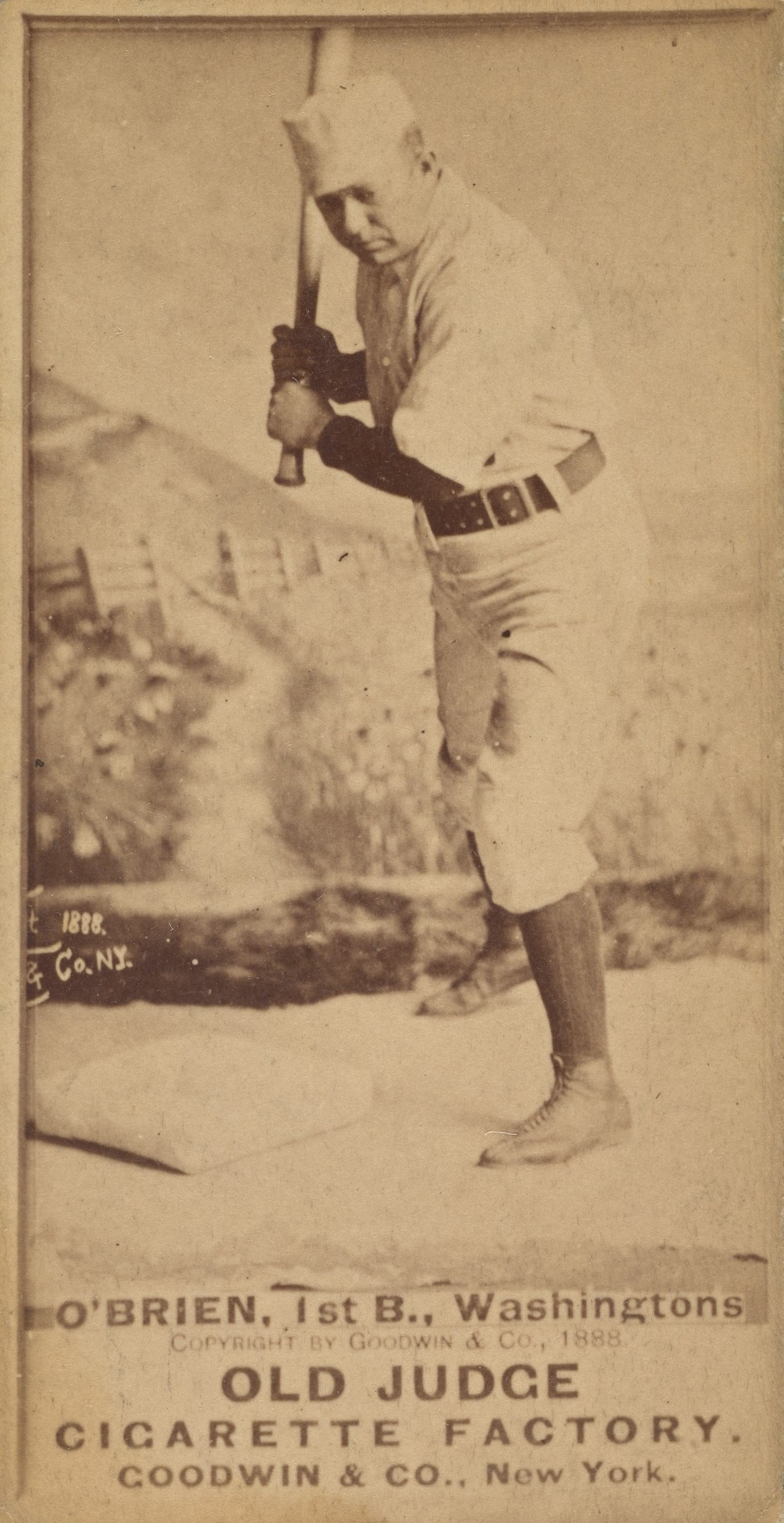
(1888) Billy O'Brien. After playing for the Freezers in 1886, O'Brien led the National League in home runs in 1887.

Overall, the St, Paul Freezers finished behind Duluth (46–33), Eau Claire (43–36), Oshkosh (39–39) and ahead of the Minneapolis Millers (36–26) and Milwaukee Brewers in the 1886 Northwestern League final standings.

In 1887, the team was renamed and the St. Paul Saints continued play under returning manager John Barnes, with the franchise remaining as members of the Northwestern League. The "Saints" is a nickname that has remained in use in the over one century of play since.

Today, the St. Paul Saints continue minor league play as the Class AAA level affiliate of the Minnesota Twins in the International League.

(1886) "St. Paul baseball grounds" West Seventh Street Park (II). From the April 8, 1886 St. Paul Globe.

== The ballpark ==
The 1886 St. Paul Freezers hosted minor league home games at the new West Seventh Street Park, also called the "St. Paul Grounds." The St. Paul Apostles had played at a nearby ballpark of the same name the previous two seasons. The relocated ballpark was located on Jefferson Street between Toronto Avenue & Warsaw Street, near West 7th Street. Nearby were the Short Line railroad tracks. Today, the St. Clair Playground park is across from the former ballpark site.

== Year–by–year record ==
Year	Record	Finish	Manager	Playoffs/Notes
1886	37–43	4th	John Barnes	No playoffs held

== Notable alumni ==
- John Barnes (1886, MGR)
- Elmer Cleveland (1886)
- Billy Colgan (1886)
- Hugh Daily (1886)
- Jesse Duryea (1886)
- Pete McShannic (1886)
- Billy O'Brien (1886)
- Harry Sage (1886)
- Jim Tray (1886)
- Walt Wilmot (1886)

== See also ==
- St. Paul Freezers players
