= Tom McLaughlin (baseball) =

American baseball player (1860–1921)

- Shortstop
- Born: March 28, 1860; Louisville, Kentucky
- Died: July 21, 1921 (aged 61); Louisville, Kentucky
- Batted: Right Threw: Right

MLB debut
- July 17, 1883, for the Louisville Eclipse

Last MLB appearance
- October 3, 1891, for the Washington Statesmen

MLB statistics
- Batting average: .192
- Home runs: 2
- Runs scored: 142
- Stats at Baseball Reference

Teams
- Louisville Eclipse/Colonels (1883–85); New York Metropolitans (1886); Washington Statesmen (1891)

Thomas McLaughlin (March 28, 1860 – July 21, 1921) was a Major League Baseball infielder. He played all or part of five seasons in the majors between 1883 and 1891. He played primarily at shortstop but also played over 100 games as a second baseman

McLaughlin debuted with the Louisville Eclipse partway through the 1883 season. He played several positions over the remainder of the season, and in 1884 he was installed as the Eclipse's starting shortstop. He played well on defense, with a fielding range and percentage well above league average, but batted just .200. In 1885, McLaughlin was moved to second base, replaced at shortstop by Joe Miller, who was signed from the Toledo Blue Stockings, which had folded. He played well again on defense, and nudged his batting average up to .212.

In 1886, McLaughlin jumped from Louisville to the New York Metropolitans, where he was back at shortstop, backing up 37-year-old Candy Nelson. Although his defense was still good, his batting average dropped to an abysmal .136 in 74 games. After that, he spent four years out of the majors, playing with the minor league Toronto Canucks and St. Paul Apostles. After returning for a brief stint with the newly formed Washington Statesmen in 1891, McLaughlin retired.

== Sources ==
- Career statistics from Baseball Reference · Baseball Reference (Minors) · Retrosheet · Baseball Almanac
