= Billy Earle =

American baseball player (1867–1946)

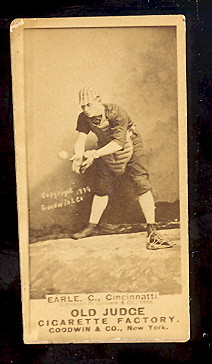
- Catcher
- Born: November 10, 1867; Philadelphia, Pennsylvania, US
- Died: May 30, 1946 (aged 78); Omaha, Nebraska, US
- Batted: Right Threw: Right

MLB debut
- April 27, 1889, for the Cincinnati Red Stockings

Last MLB appearance
- September 6, 1894, for the Brooklyn Grooms

MLB statistics
- Batting average: .286
- Home runs: 6
- Runs batted in: 74
- Stats at Baseball Reference

Teams
- Cincinnati Red Stockings (1889); St. Louis Browns (1890); Pittsburgh Pirates (1892–1893); Louisville Colonels (1894); Brooklyn Grooms (1894)

William Moffat Earle (November 10, 1867 – May 30, 1946), nicknamed "the Little Globetrotter", was an American Major League Baseball player who mainly played as a catcher for five teams from 1889 to 1894.

He was known as one of the best catchers of his time, although he shifted from team to team by contract jumping, threatening to contract jump if he was not happy. He was most noted for his "creepy" nature. He thought of himself as a hypnotist, and was interested in spiritual healing. His teammates reported feeling uncomfortable around him, his eyes making them feel helpless and was known as somewhat of a "Weirdo".

== Career ==
Born in Philadelphia, Earle began his Major League career with the Cincinnati Red Stockings in 1889, and split his playing time between catcher and right field. In 53 total games played that season, his career high, he hit .269, scored 37 runs, stole 26 bases, and hit four home runs in 169 at bats.

Earle was sold by the Red Stockings to the St. Louis Browns before the 1890 season began, and played in just 22 games, batted .233, and scored 16 runs. During the season, he was released by the Browns, but was soon playing with Tacoma of the Pacific Northwest League, where he finished the season. He played sparingly for the Pittsburgh Pirates during the 1892 and 1893 seasons. For the 1894 season, he began playing with the Louisville Colonels, and batted .354 in 21 games. Although he hit well, and had a .954 fielding percentage, he was released in July. He signed with the Brooklyn Grooms shortly thereafter, and did equally as well. In his 14 games for them, he batted .340 and had a .930 fielding percentage. In total that season, he batted .348 in 35 games between the two teams, but he never played another Major League season.

== Personality ==
In December 1890, Earle had studied hypnosis, reportedly to mesmerize a lady who had previously showed no interest in him. The Reach Guide published in 1893, also claimed that Earle possessed hypnotic powers, and was a practicing spiritualist who also dabbled in spiritual healing and magnetism as well as hypnotism. According to Bill Stern in his book Bill Stern's Favorite Baseball Stories, players recalled that Earle had a pair of piercing eyes, and gave anyone who he looked at a creepy, helpless feeling. Other teammates reported that they thought he had an "evil eye".

Bill Barnes, a former teammate of Earle's when they played for the Duluth Freezers in 1887, noted an incident that happened on May 11 on the Mississippi River near LaCrosse, Wisconsin. He, Earle, and another teammate, John Ake, were in a boat when a wave created by a passing steamer capsized the boat. Barnes and Earle were able to swim to shore, but Ake drowned when he attempted to swim ashore himself. Barnes related that he would never forget the look in Earles' eyes when he was watching Ake. Earle was good enough as a player that no matter much he travelled around, he was able to catch on with some team; it was superstition, more than anything else, that eventually kept Earle from continuing his professional playing career.

== Post-career ==
After his playing days ended, he became a part-owner, and managed an independent team in Clarksville, Tennessee. On his 1895 team was future Major League player and manager, Kid Elberfeld, with whom he joined the Dallas Navigators of the Texas Southern League for the 1896 season. Before the season began, he and Elberfeld had a lengthy salary dispute with the team, and it was not settled in their favor, so after Elberfeld was injured in May, both men jumped their contracts with Dallas. Earle, shortly thereafter, joined Princeton University as a coach.

In 1902, he became manager of the Cuban Fe Club on a cooperative basis, meaning that it was not a paid position. He was barred from playing for any of the clubs in the Cuban league due to their rule of not allowing any professional United States players from joining the league. It was noted that during this period that he was nearly penniless from losing at poker games.

Earle died at the age of 78 in Omaha, Nebraska, and is interred at Forest Lawn Memorial Cemetery.

== Bibliography ==
- James, Bill. 2003. The New Bill James Historical Baseball Abstract: The Classic. Simon and Schuster. ISBN 0-7432-2722-0.
- Nemec, David. 1994. The Beer And Whiskey League: The Illustrated History of the American Association—Baseball's Renegade Major League. Lyons and Burford. ISBN 1-59228-188-5.
