= Fort Wayne Hoosiers (baseball) =

The Fort Wayne Hoosiers minor league baseball team played in the Northwestern League in 1883 and 1884. Based in Fort Wayne, Indiana, the team played its home games at The Grand Duchess.

Many major league players spent time with the team, including seven-year veteran John Kerins and ten-year veteran Jack Remsen.
