= Charlie Abbey =

American baseball player (1866–1926)

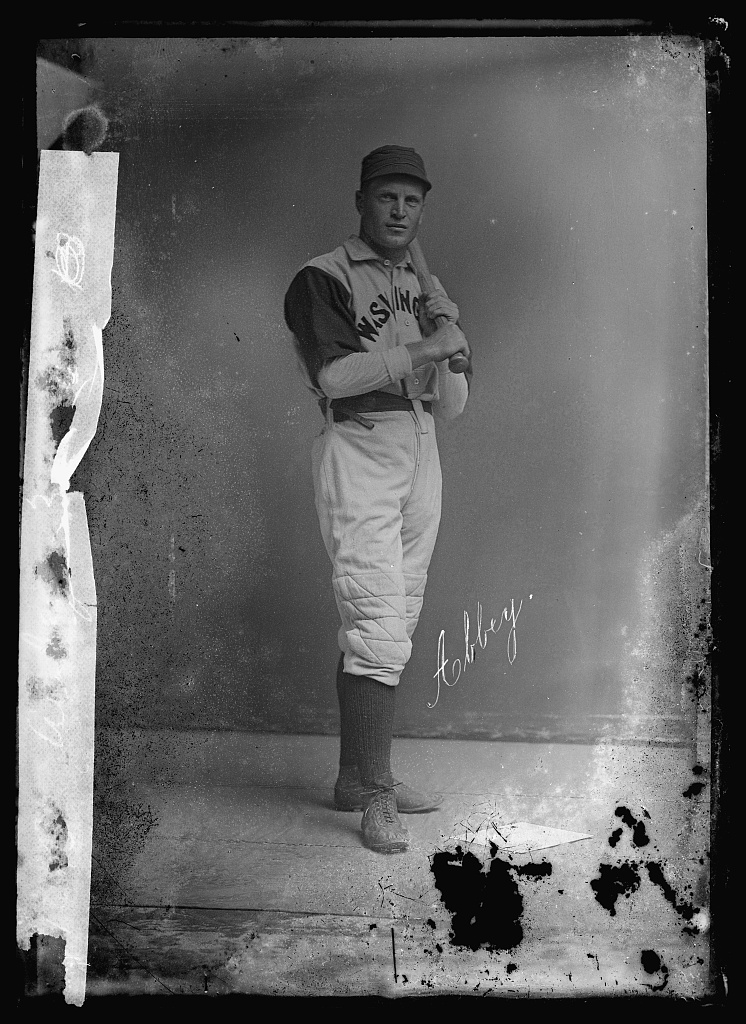
- Outfielder
- Born: October 14, 1866; Falls City, Nebraska, U.S.
- Died: April 27, 1926 (aged 59); San Francisco, California, U.S.
- Batted: Left Threw: Left

MLB debut
- August 16, 1893, for the Washington Senators

Last MLB appearance
- August 19, 1897, for the Washington Senators

MLB statistics
- Batting average: .281
- Home runs: 19
- Runs batted in: 280
- Stolen bases: 93
- Stats at Baseball Reference

Teams
- Washington Senators (1893–1897)

Charles S. Abbey (October 14, 1866 – April 27, 1926) was an American professional baseball player whose career spanned 11 seasons, including five seasons in Major League Baseball with the Washington Senators (1893–1897). Over his major league career, Abbey batted .281 with 307 runs, 493 hits, 67 doubles, 46 triples, 19 home runs, 280 runs batted in (RBIs) and 93 stolen bases in 452 games played. In addition to playing in the majors, Abbey also played in the minor leagues with numerous teams. Abbey primarily played the outfield position; however, he did pitch one game in the majors. Abbey batted and threw left-handed.

== Professional career ==
=== Early career ===
Abbey began his professional career with the independent league Beatrice, Nebraska, baseball team in 1888. In 1889, Abbey played for the independent league Kearney, Nebraska, baseball team and the Des Moines Prohibitionists of the Western Association. During the 1890 season, Abbey played for the St. Paul Apostles of the Western Association. In 1891, Abbey played for two teams, the St. Paul Apostles and the Portland Gladiators of the Pacific Northwest League. Abbey played with the Columbus Reds, the Ishpeming-Nagaunee Unions and the Marinette Badgers in 1892.

=== Washington Senators ===
In 1893, Abbey began his tenure with the Washington Senators of Major League Baseball's National League. He made his major league debut on August 16, 1893. When Abbey made his debut, he became the first person from Nebraska to play in the majors. On the season, Abbey batted .259 with 11 runs, 30 hits, one double, four triples, 12 runs batted in (RBIs) and nine stolen bases in 31 games played. On the defensive side, Abbey played all of his 31 games in the outfield and committed five errors in 79 total chances. In 1894, Abbey batted .314 with 95 runs, 164 hits, 26 doubles, 18 triples, seven home runs, 101 RBIs and 31 stolen bases in 129 games played. Abbey led the Senators in plate appearances (589), at-bats (523), hits and triples. Abbey also led all rookies in the majors in games played, at-bats, triples and walks (63). Abbey played all of his 129 games in the outfield and committed 37 errors in 407 total chances. During the 1895 season, Abbey batted .275 with 102 runs, 142 hits, 14 doubles, 10 triples, eight home runs, 84 RBIs and 28 stolen bases in 133 games played. He led the National League in assists as an outfielder (34) and defensive games in the outfield (133). In 1896, Abbey played 79 games with the Senators and batted .262 with 47 runs, 79 hits, 12 doubles, six doubles, one home run, 49 RBIs and 16 stolen bases. Abbey also pitched one game, giving-up three runs (one earned) in two innings pitched. As an outfielder, Abbey committed 16 errors 132 total chances. During his final season in professional baseball, 1897, Abbey batted .260 with 52 runs, 78 hits, 14 doubles, eight triples, three home runs, 34 RBIs and nine stolen bases in 80 games played. In all of his 80 games, Abbey played in the outfield and committed eight errors in 148 total chances. During the 1897 season, Abbey was used as a first base umpire in two National League games. Abbey also played for the Providence Clamdiggers that season in the minor leagues.

== Personal ==
Abbey was born on October 14, 1866, in Falls City, Nebraska. He was married to Felicity Roman in 1897. A daughter, Lucille, was born in 1900. On April 27, 1926, Abbey died at the age of 59 in San Francisco, California.
