= Clarence Murphy =

American baseball player

- Left fielder
- Batted: Unknown Threw: Unknown

MLB debut
- June 17, 1886, for the Louisville Colonels

Last MLB appearance
- June 17, 1886, for the Louisville Colonels

MLB statistics
- At bats: 3
- Hits: 0
- Stats at Baseball Reference

Teams
- Louisville Colonels (1886)

Clarence Murphy was a professional baseball player who played left field. He spent two seasons in pro-baseball, one in Major League Baseball. In total, Murphy played 1 game at the Major League level, and had 3 plate appearances where he didn't get a hit

== Professional career ==
Murphy began his career in 1886 with the Major League Louisville Colonels. On the defensive side, Murphy played his only game in the outfield, and in 2 total chances he made 2 putouts. In 3 at bats, Murphy didn't get a hit. The next season, Murphy played what would be his last season in professional baseball with the minor league St. Paul Saints of the Northwestern League.
