= John Barnes (baseball manager) =

American baseball manager

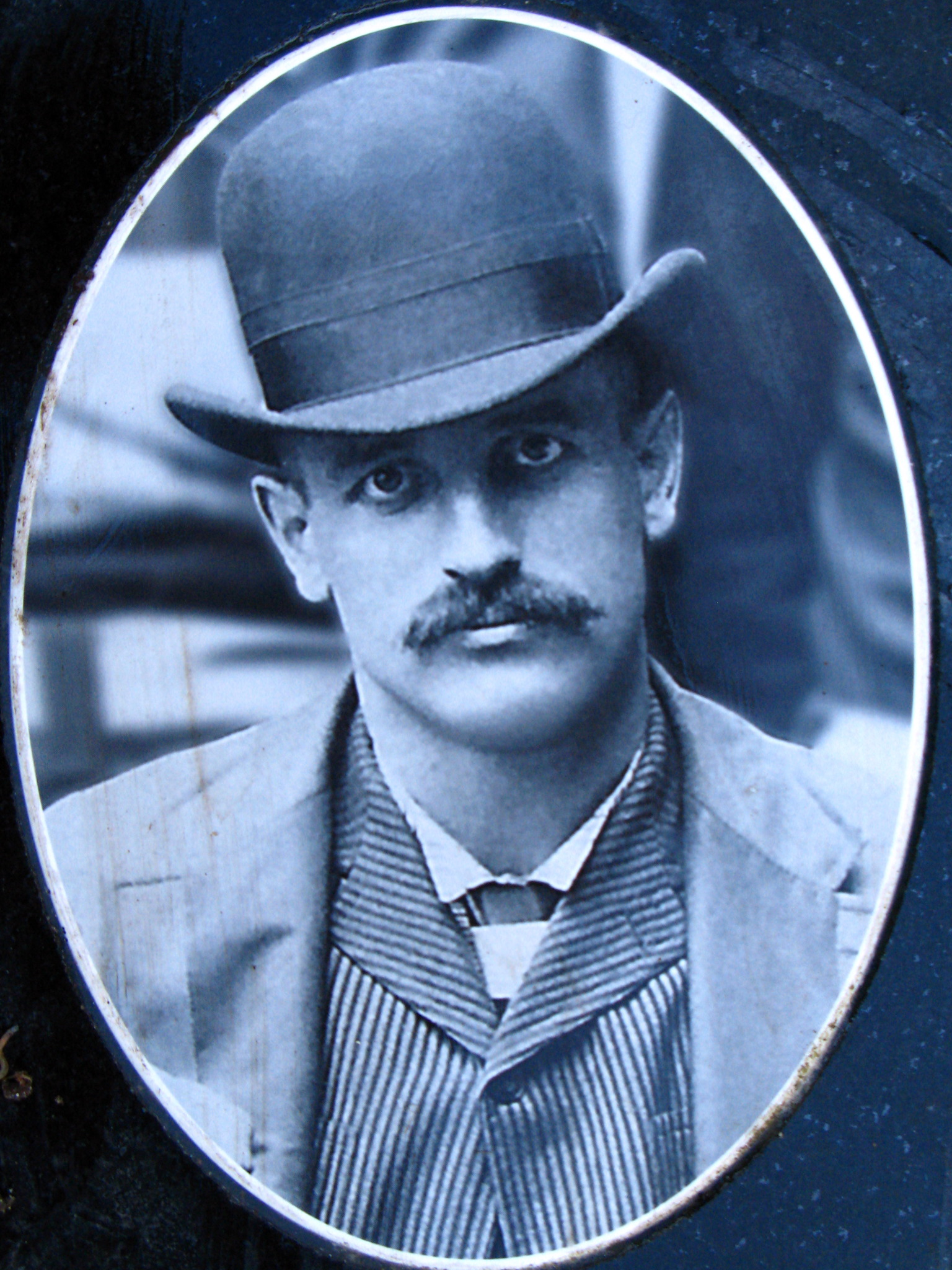
John Sloane Barnes

John Sloane Barnes (August 30, 1855 – September 15, 1929) was a Minor League Baseball manager, athlete, promoter, and proponent of physical fitness.

Born in Ireland, Barnes organized the Pacific Northwest League in 1890, the first professional baseball league in the region. In that same year, he led the Spokane team to the Pacific Northwest League pennant. After managing the Portland Webfeet in 1892, he played a key role in the reorganization of the Western League, which later became the American League, before devoting a decade to the promotion of physical fitness in China. In 1909, Barnes returned to manage the Butte Miners in Montana, and in 1915 operated the Aberdeen Black Cats franchise. Barnes is interred at Evergreen Washelli Memorial Park in Seattle, Washington.

== Career ==
Year	Team	League	Classification
1886	St. Paul Freezers	Northwestern League	N/A
1887	St. Paul Saints	Northwestern League	N/A
1889	St. Paul Apostles	Western Association	N/A
1892	Spokane Bunchgrassers	Pacific Northwestern League	B
1892	Portland Webfeet	Pacific Northwestern League	B
1894	Minnesota Minnies	Western League	N/A
1895	Minnesota Millers	Western League	A
1909	Butte Miners	Inter-Mountain League	D
