= Andrew Thompson (baseball manager) =

American baseball manager (1845–1895)

- Manager
- Born: November 9, 1845; Seward, Illinois
- Died: February 17, 1895 (aged 49); Pecatonica, Illinois
- Batted: Unknown Threw: Unknown

MLB debut
- September 27, 1884, for the St. Paul Saints

Last MLB appearance
- October 13, 1884, for the St. Paul Saints

MLB statistics
- Games managed: 9
- Win–loss record: 2–6–1
- Winning %: .250

Teams
- St. Paul Saints (1884)

Andrew M. Thompson (November 9, 1845 – February 17, 1895) was a professional baseball manager for the one season in the Union Association. Thompson managed all nine games for the St. Paul Saints in 1884, and led them to a win–loss record of 2–6–1.

Born in Seward, Illinois, he served in the American Civil War as a drummer boy. Thompson died in Pecatonica, Illinois at the age of 49, and is interred at Watson Cemetery in Pecatonica.
