= Mike Kelley (baseball) =

American baseball player (1875–1955)

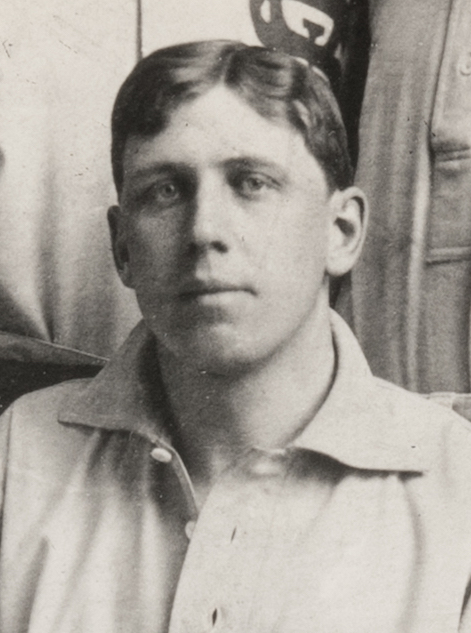
- Kelley in 1903 with the St. Paul Saints
- First baseman / Manager
- Born: December 2, 1875; Templeton, Massachusetts, U.S.
- Died: June 6, 1955 (aged 79); Minneapolis, Minnesota, U.S.
- Batted: Right Threw: Right

Major league debut
- July 15, 1899, for the Louisville Colonels

Last major league appearance
- October 14, 1899, for the Louisville Colonels

Major league statistics
- Batting average: .241
- Home runs: 3
- Runs batted in: 33

Minor league statistics
- Managerial record: 2,390–2,102
- Winning %: .532
- Stats at Baseball Reference

Teams
- Major league (player): Louisville Colonels (1899); Minor league (manager): St. Paul Saints (1902–1905); Minneapolis Millers (1906); Des Moines Champs (1907); Toronto Maple Leafs (1908); St. Paul Saints (1908–1912); Indianapolis Indians (1913); St. Paul Saints (1915–1923); Minneapolis Millers (1924–1931)

Career highlights and awards
- 5× American Association pennant (1903, 1904, 1919, 1920, 1922)

Michael Joseph Kelley (December 2, 1875 – June 6, 1955) was an American professional baseball first baseman, manager, and owner. He played professionally for 13 seasons, including one year in the major leagues with the Louisville Colonels of the National League, but he is best known for his career as both a manager and an owner in the minor leagues, which spanned the first half of the 20th century. He became a legendary figure in the "Twin Cities" of Minneapolis–St. Paul.

== Baseball career ==
Born in Templeton, Massachusetts, Kelley's professional baseball career began with the Augusta Kennebecs of the New England League in 1895. He played for various teams in the New England League and the Eastern League until 1899, when he was purchased by the Louisville Colonels of the National League. A right-handed hitter and thrower, he appeared in 76 games that season, and he batted .241 with three home runs and had 33 runs batted in. At the end of the season, the NL shrunk from twelve to eight teams and the Colonels were disbanded. Barney Dreyfuss, owner of the Colonels, bought a half interest in the Pittsburg Pirates and transferred much of Louisville's talent, including Kelley, to Pittsburg. Three months later, the Pirates sold Kelley to the Indianapolis Hoosiers of the American League.

He played with Indianapolis until the club folded midway through the 1901 season, at which point he signed with the St. Paul Saints of the Western League. Kelley was promoted to player-manager of the team for the 1902 season, taking over the job from Jimmy Ryan.

Apart from 4½ seasons, Kelley managed in the Twin Cities through 1931. He coached the St. Paul team for nearly 18 seasons (1902–05; August 1908 – 1912; 1915–23), where he won five championships. His 1920 Saints won 115 games, the 1922 team notched 107 victories – each time winning the pennant – and his 1923 club won 111 games while finishing second, two games behind the Kansas City Blues.

Kelley first managed the Minneapolis Millers for one season (1906). At the close of the 1923 season, he purchased the Millers and became their manager. He led the Millers through 1931, but never won a pennant; his highest finish was second, to the Indianapolis Indians, in 1928. After a sixth-place finish in '31, he retired to the club presidency, operating the Millers until he sold them to the New York Giants in 1946. His overall record in his 30 years as a minor league manager was 2,390 wins and 2,102 losses for a .532 winning percentage.

== Post-career ==
Kelley died at the age of 79 in Minneapolis, and is interred at Lakewood Cemetery.
