= Tod Brynan =

American baseball player (1863–1925)

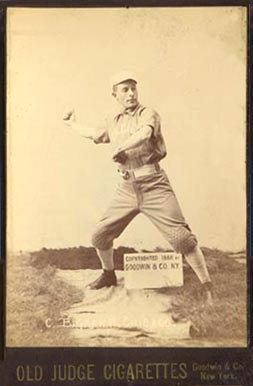
- Pitcher/Left fielder
- Born: July 30, 1863; Philadelphia, Pennsylvania, U.S.
- Died: May 10, 1925 (aged 61); Philadelphia, Pennsylvania, U.S.
- Batted: Right Threw: Right

MLB debut
- June 22, 1888, for the Chicago White Stockings

Last MLB appearance
- May 26, 1891, for the Boston Beaneaters

MLB statistics
- Win–loss record: 2–2
- Earned run average: 8.31
- Strikeouts: 11
- Stats at Baseball Reference

Teams
- Chicago White Stockings (1888); Boston Beaneaters (1891)

Charles Ruley "Tod" Brynan (July 1863 – May 10, 1925) was an American right-handed pitcher/outfielder in Major League Baseball for the Chicago White Stockings (later the Cubs) and Boston Beaneaters (now the Atlanta Braves).

Brynan debuted with the White Stockings on June 22, 1888, against the Pittsburgh Alleghenys. He pitched in three games that season, completing two, on his way to posting a record of 2–1 with an inflated 6.48 ERA. He also made one appearance in left field during his tenure with the Stockings. At the plate that season, he hit .182 with a triple and an RBI in 11 trips to the plate.

Brynan would not resurface until May 26, 1891, pitching for the Beaneaters. He started that game on the mound but did not last long, getting pulled after a disastrous first inning in which he allowed six earned runs on four hits and three walks for an unfortunate ERA of 54.00.

He also played in the minors in the Southern Association in 1886, Northwestern League in 1887, Western Association from 1888 to 1889 and Michigan State League in 1889.
