= Seward, Illinois =

Seward
- Unincorporated community
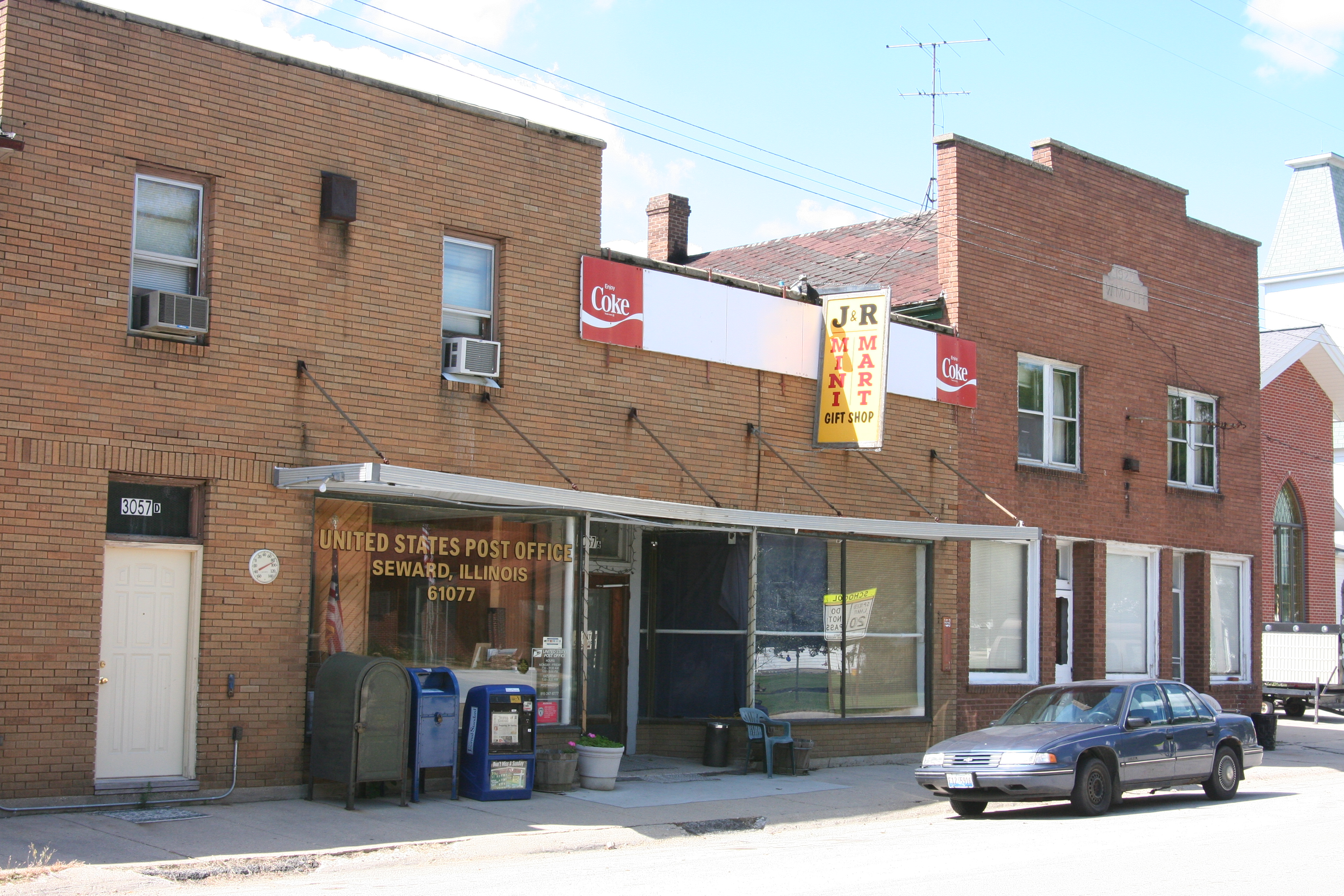
- Former post office and buildings on the main street

- Location of Seward within Illinois
- Coordinates: 42°14′09″N 89°21′28″W
- Country: United States
- State: Illinois
- County: Winnebago
- Township: Seward
- Established: 1818
- Elevation: 896 ft (273 m)

Population (2000)
  - Total: 200
- Time zone: UTC-6 (CST)
  - Summer (DST): UTC-5 (CDT)
- Postal code: 61077
- Area code: 815

Seward is an unincorporated community in Winnebago County, Illinois, United States, and is located west of Rockford. It is part of the Rockford, Illinois Metropolitan Statistical Area.

== 2007 ammonia leak ==
On April 23, 2007, workers at the Seward Agricultural Supply Inc. were transferring Anhydrous ammonia from a storage tank to a tanker truck when a hose burst, causing the chemical to leak completely out. It turned into a large, toxic plume cloud that drifted into Seward. A mandatory evacuation was ordered for the town's approximately 300 residents, while a voluntary evacuation was put out for nearby Pecatonica and Winnebago. The incident caused at least 10 minor injuries, but no fatalities, and residents were allowed to return 12 hours later.
