= Sun Daly =

American baseball player (1865–1938)

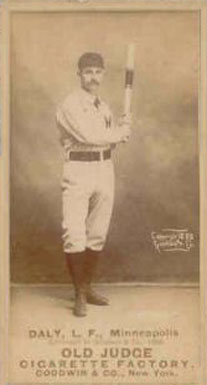
- Outfielder
- Born: January 6, 1865; Port Henry, New York
- Died: April 30, 1938 (aged 73); Albany, New York
- Batted: Left Threw: Unknown

MLB debut
- September 30, 1892, for the Baltimore Orioles

Last MLB appearance
- October 15, 1892, for the Baltimore Orioles

MLB statistics
- Batting average: .250
- Home runs: 0
- Runs batted in: 7

Teams
- Baltimore Orioles (1892)

James J. Daly (January 6, 1865 – April 30, 1938) was a Major League Baseball player in 1892. He started the year in the Eastern League and was acquired by the Baltimore Orioles late in the season. He played in various minor leagues from 1888 to 1897.

Daly was nicknamed "Sun" because he did not wear sunglasses while playing the outfield.
