= Jack McMahon (baseball) =

American baseball player (1869–1894)

- First baseman / Catcher
- Born: October 15, 1869; Waterbury, Connecticut, U.S.
- Died: December 30, 1894 (aged 25); Bridgeport, Connecticut, U.S.
- Batted: Right Threw: Left

MLB debut
- August 8, 1892, for the New York Giants

Last MLB appearance
- June 19, 1893, for the New York Giants

MLB statistics
- Games played: 51
- At bats: 177
- Hits: 43
- Stats at Baseball Reference

Teams
- New York Giants (1892–1893)

John Henry McMahon (October 15, 1869 – December 30, 1894) was an American Major League Baseball (MLB) first baseman and catcher. He played in 51 games, with a .243 batting average, for the New York Giants of the National League in 1892 and 1893.

== Sources ==
- Career statistics from Baseball Reference · Baseball Reference (Minors) · Retrosheet · Baseball Almanac
