= Bill Goodenough =

American baseball player (1863–1905)

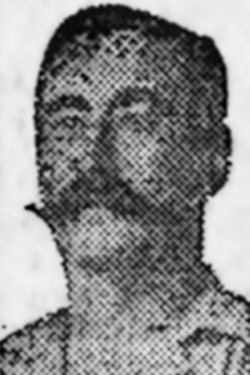
- Center fielder
- Born: 1863; Watertown, New York, US
- Died: May 24, 1905 (aged 41-42); St. Louis, Missouri, US
- Batted: Left Threw: Unknown

MLB debut
- August 31, 1893, for the St. Louis Browns

Last MLB appearance
- September 11, 1893, for the St. Louis Browns

MLB statistics
- Batting average: .161
- Home runs: 0
- Runs batted in: 2
- Stats at Baseball Reference

Teams
- St. Louis Browns (1893)

William B. Goodenough (1863 – May 24, 1905) was an American center fielder in Major League Baseball. He played for the St. Louis Browns in 1893.
