= Billy Hart (baseball) =

American baseball player (1866–1944)

- Pitcher
- Born: May 16, 1866; Palmyra, Missouri, U.S.
- Died: May 14, 1944 (aged 77); Hannibal, Missouri, U.S.
- Batted: Unknown Threw: Unknown

MLB debut
- July 13, 1890, for the St. Louis Browns

Last MLB appearance
- October 14, 1890, for the St. Louis Browns

MLB statistics
- Win–loss record: 12-8
- Earned run average: 3.67
- Strikeouts: 95
- Stats at Baseball Reference

Teams
- St. Louis Browns (1890)

Robert Lee Hart (May 16, 1866 – May 14, 1944) was an American professional baseball player who played pitcher in the Major Leagues for the 1890 St.Louis Browns of the American Association. He played in the minors from 1886–1892.
