= Lem Hunter =

American baseball player (1863–1956)

- Pitcher / Outfielder
- Born: January 16, 1863; Warren, Ohio, U.S.
- Died: November 9, 1956 (aged 93); West Lafayette, Ohio, U.S.
- Batted: Unknown Threw: Unknown

MLB debut
- September 1, 1883, for the Cleveland Blues

Last MLB appearance
- September 1, 1883, for the Cleveland Blues

MLB statistics
- Batting average: .250
- Earned run average: 1.42
- Strikeouts: 4
- Stats at Baseball Reference

Teams
- Cleveland Blues (1883)

Robert Lemuel Hunter (January 16, 1863 – November 9, 1956) was an American Major League Baseball player for the 1883 Cleveland Blues. He appeared in one game for the Blues on September 1, 1883, appearing as both an outfielder and a pitcher in the game.

== Sources ==
- Career statistics from Baseball Reference · Baseball Reference (Minors) · Retrosheet · Baseball Almanac
