= Northwestern League =

Defunct sports league of minor league baseball in the United States

- Sport: Baseball
- First season: 1879
- Folded: 1891
- No. of teams: 4 to 12 each season
- Country: United States

The Northwestern League was a sports league that operated in the Central United States during the early years of professional baseball for six seasons: 1879, 1883–1884, 1886–1887, and 1891. After the 1887 season, the league was replaced by the Western Association, although the Northwestern League returned for its final season in 1891 as an independent baseball league.

The Northwestern League of 1883–1884 is considered the first baseball "minor league", as it was party to the National Agreement of 1883, along with the National League and American Association, whereby the leagues agreed to honor each other's suspensions, expulsions, and player reserve clauses, and established territorial rights.

An unrelated Northwestern League, located in the Pacific Northwest, later formed in 1905.

== Results by season ==
The league operated for a total of six seasons, during a span of 13 years.

=== 1879 ===
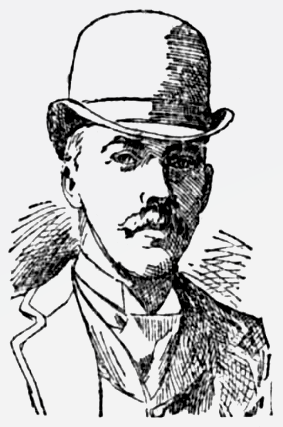
Ted Sullivan

Four teams participated in the 1879 season, which ran from May 1 to July 7.

1879 Northwestern League final standings
Team	Record	GB	Manager
Dubuque Red Stockings	19–5 (.792)	—	Ted Sullivan
Rockford White Stockings	13–9 (.591)	5	James McKee
Omaha Green Stockings	5–13 (.278)	11	
Davenport Brown Stockings	5–15 (.250)	12	J. W. Green

=== 1883 ===
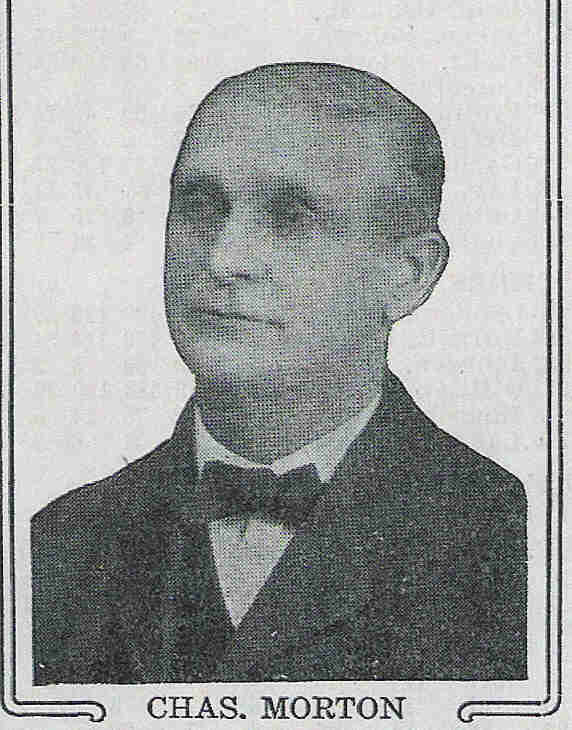
Charlie Morton

The 1883 season featured eight teams and ran from May 1 to September 29. Saginaw won the pennant.

1883 Northwestern League final standings
Team	Record	GB	Manager
Toledo Blue Stockings	56–28 (.667)	—	William Voltz / Charlie Morton
Saginaw Greys	54–30 (.643)	2	Arthur Whitney
Peoria Reds	49–35 (.583)	7	Charles Flynn / Charles Levis / A. C. Harding
Grand Rapids (MI)	48–36 (.571)	8	Charles Eden / Henry Jones
Springfield (IL)	37–47 (.440)	19	C. J. Frichtel / John Peters / John Crawford
Bay City (MI)	35–49 (.417)	21	John Crawford / William Montgomery / Chester Morgan
Fort Wayne Hoosiers	34–50 (.405)	22	Jack Remsen / Milton Scott
Quincy Quincys	23–61 (.274)	33	Charles Overrecker / Ed Hengel / Dickey Pearce

=== 1884 ===
The 1884 season began on May 1 with 12 teams. The Bay City team disbanded in late July and was replaced by Evansville. In early August, multiple other teams disbanded. Play continued through August 13, at which time Milwaukee had the best record of teams still active. Milwaukee was later offered the league championship for the abbreviated season, but declined it.

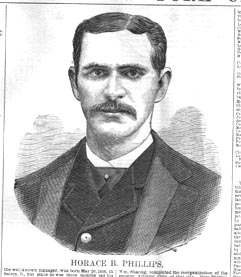
Horace Phillips

1884 Northwestern League final standings (1)
Team	Record	GB	Manager
Grand Rapids (MI)	48–15 (.762)	—	Horace Phillips
Saginaw Greys	47–21 (.691)	3 1/2	William Dyer
Quincy Quincys	45–23 (.662)	5 1/2	George Brackett
Peoria Reds	40–25 (.615)	9	James Whitfield / Charles Flynn
Milwaukee Brewers	42–30 (.583)	10 1/2	Charles Cushman / James McKee / Tom Loftus
Minneapolis Millers	30–42 (.417)	22 1/2	Benjamin Tuthill
Muskegon (MI)	23–40 (.365)	27	A. R. Bradford / Charles Cushman / John Rainey
Fort Wayne Hoosiers	22–43 (.338)	29	John McDonough / Harry Smith
St. Paul Apostles	24–48 (.333)	30 1/2	Lem Hunter / Andrew Thompson
Stillwater (MN)	21–46 (.313)	31	Joseph May / Joe Miller / Fred Gunkle / John Peters
Terre Haute (IN)	15–50 (.231)	36	Al Buckenberger / George Hammerstein
Evansville (IN)	4–1 (.800)	n/a	Stephen Hagan
Bay City (MI)	39–16 (.709)	n/a	Bill Watkins

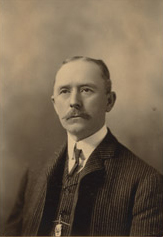
Tom Loftus

The league reorganized on August 14, and started a second season with a limited schedule of 24 games planned for each of four teams. This short season would also end early due to financial difficulties, with the final game played on September 7.

1884 Northwestern League final standings (2)
Team	Record	GB	Manager
Milwaukee Brewers	11–4 (.733)	—	Tom Loftus
Minneapolis Millers	7–4 (.636)	2	Benjamin Tuthill
St. Paul Apostles	7–7 (.500)	3 1/2	Andrew Thompson
Winona Clippers	1–11 (.083)	8 1/2	John Rainey

The St. Paul and Milwaukee teams were late-season additions to the major league Union Association.

=== 1886–1887 ===
In 1886, the league was recreated when the Duluth Jayhawks; Eau Claire Lumbermen; St. Paul Freezers, Minneapolis Millers, Milwaukee Brewers, and the Oshkosh, Wisconsin based Oshkosh team composed the league. Duluth won the championship.

In 1887, the Northwestern League featured the Des Moines Hawkeyes, Duluth Freezers, Eau Claire, LaCrosse Freezers, Milwaukee Cream Citys, Minneapolis Millers, Oshkosh and the St. Paul Saints. Oshkosh won the championship.

=== 1891 ===
==== Teams ====
- Bay City, Michigan: Bay City
- Dayton, Ohio: Dayton
- Detroit, Michigan: Detroit Wolverines
- Evansville, Indiana: Evansville Hoosiers
- Fort Wayne, Indiana: Ft. Wayne
- Grand Rapids, Michigan: Grand Rapids Shamrocks
- Peoria, Illinois: Peoria Distillers
- Terre Haute, Indiana: Terre Haute Hottentots

==== Standings ====
League president: W. H. Ketcham

1891 Northwestern League
Team standings	W	L	PCT	GB	Manager(s)
Evansville Hoosiers	44	29	.603	–	Andy Sommers
Ft. Wayne	39	33	.542	4½	Guy Hecker
Terre Haute Hottentots	28	41	.406	14	Billy Clingman / George Brackett
Grand Rapids Shamrocks	28	44	.389	15½	John Murphy
Peoria Distillers	42	17	.712	NA	George Brackett
Dayton	27	30	.474	NA	Harry Fisher
Bay City	12	17	.414	NA	Fred Craves / John Whalen
Detroit Wolverines	10	19	.345	NA	Rasty Wright

Note: Peoria and Dayton disbanded July 16; Bay City disbanded June 7; Detroit disbanded June 6
Peoria won the first and second split-season. Evansville won the third split-season.

Schedule:
