= Rasty Wright (outfielder) =

American baseball player (1863–1922)

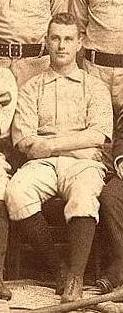
- Outfielder
- Born: January 31, 1863; Birmingham, Michigan, U.S.
- Died: October 14, 1922 (aged 59); Duluth, Minnesota, U.S.
- Batted: Left Threw: Unknown

MLB debut
- April 17, 1890, for the Syracuse Stars

Last MLB appearance
- October 4, 1890, for the Cleveland Spiders

MLB statistics
- Batting average: .282
- Home runs: 0
- Runs batted in: 29
- Stats at Baseball Reference

Teams
- Syracuse Stars (1890); Cleveland Spiders (1890)

William Smith "Rasty" Wright (January 31, 1863 – October 14, 1922) was an American professional baseball player. An outfielder, he played just one season in Major League Baseball, 1890, which he split between two teams. He began the season with the American Association's Syracuse Stars, but was released in August. He then moved on to the Cleveland Spiders to finish the season.

Wright also had an extensive minor league baseball career, spanning sixteen seasons. He began his professional career with Muskegon in the Northwestern League in 1884, and played until 1899, which he spent with the Paterson Giants and Buffalo Bisons. He also managed the Grand Rapids (baseball) team in 1894-95 and the Paterson Giants in 1899. He is "probably (the) first player to collect 2,000 hits in (the) minor leagues."

In addition to having back-to-back seasons hitting above .400 for Grand Rapids, he is noted to have hit safely in 51 consecutive games spanning the 1894-1895 seasons, which was finally broken at Detroit by the Tigers on June 20, 1895. It is the earliest known achievement of a 50-game hitting streak in the history of organized baseball, while the press made little mention of this. The streak may be followed in the box scores published by The Sporting Life.

== Sources ==
- Career statistics from Baseball Reference · Baseball Reference (Minors) · Retrosheet · Baseball Almanac
