= Bill Barnes (outfielder) =

American baseball player (1858–1945)

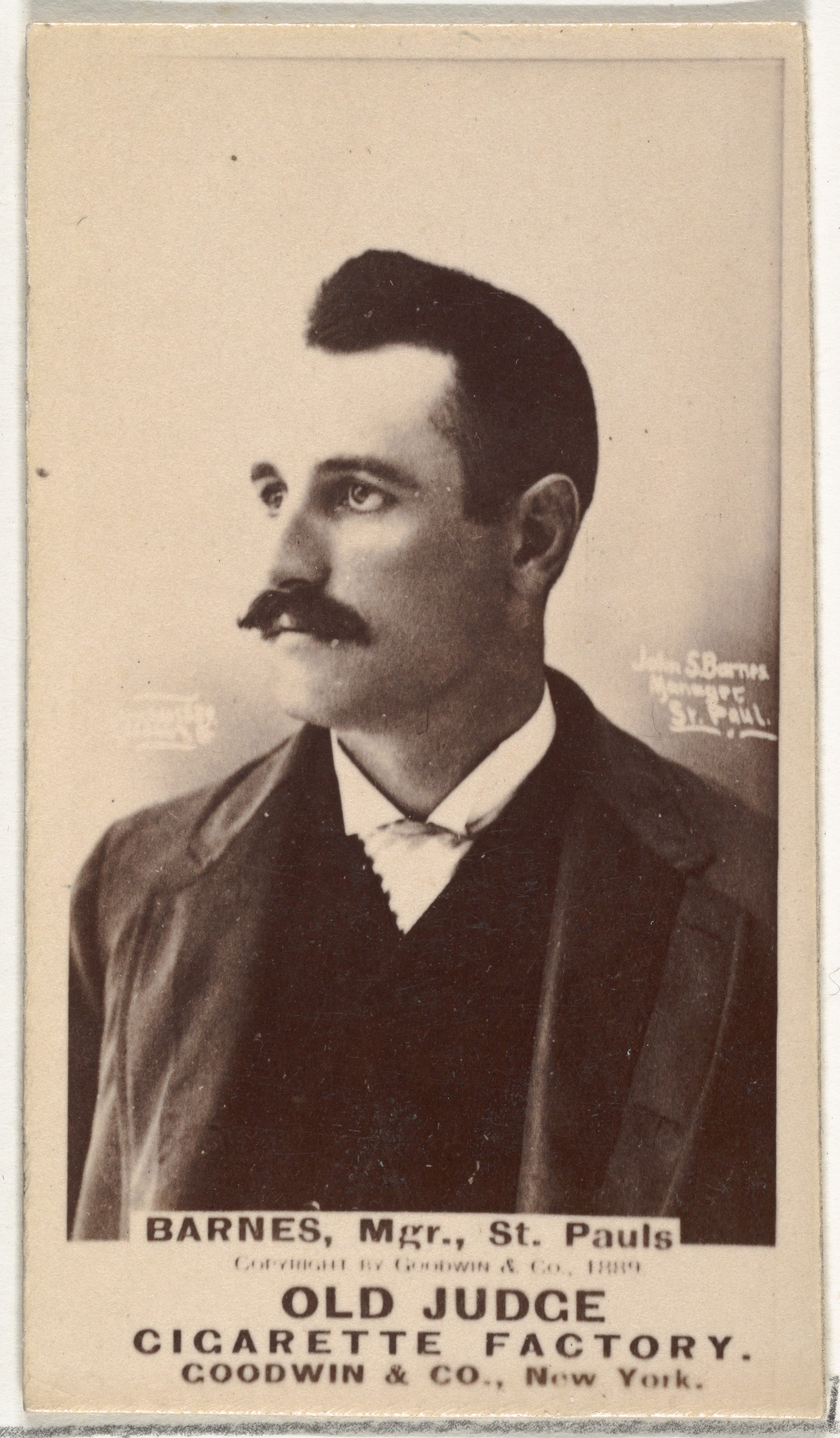
- Center fielder
- Born: April 13, 1858; Shakopee, Minnesota
- Died: July 10, 1945 (aged 87); St. Paul, Minnesota
- Batted: Unknown Threw: Unknown

MLB debut
- September 27, 1884, for the St. Paul Saints

Last MLB appearance
- October 13, 1884, for the St. Paul Saints

MLB statistics
- Batting average: .200
- Hits: 6
- Home runs: 0
- Stats at Baseball Reference

Teams
- St. Paul Saints (1884)

William H. Barnes (April 13, 1858 – July 10, 1945) was a baseball player, playing as a center fielder in the 19th century. He played for the St. Paul Saints of the Union Association, a replacement team which began playing near the end of the 1884 season. He was a native of Indianapolis, Indiana.

In 8 games as the Saints' starting center fielder, Barnes batted .200 (6-for-30) with two runs scored. In the field, he recorded eight putouts, three errors, and participated in one double play.
