= Joe Miller (shortstop) =

American baseball player (1861–1928)

- Shortstop
- Born: February 17, 1861; Baltimore, Maryland, U.S.
- Died: April 23, 1928 (aged 67); Wheeling, West Virginia, U.S.
- Batted: Right Threw: Unknown

MLB debut
- May 1, 1884, for the Toledo Blue Stockings

Last MLB appearance
- September 15, 1885, for the Louisville Colonels

MLB statistics
- Games played: 203
- Runs scored: 90
- Batting average: .214
- Stats at Baseball Reference

Teams
- Toledo Blue Stockings (1884); Louisville Colonels (1885)

Joseph A. Miller (February 17, 1861 – April 23, 1928) was an American Major League Baseball player born in Baltimore, Maryland, who played shortstop for two seasons, one for the 1884 Toledo Blue Stockings and the other for the 1885 Louisville Colonels. He had a career batting average of .214 in 203 total games played.

Miller died in Wheeling, West Virginia at the age of 67, and is interred at Mount Calvary Cemetery in Wheeling.
