= Minneapolis Millers =

- 1884–1960; (1884, 1886–1891, 1894–1960); Minneapolis

Minor league affiliations
- Class: Triple-A (1946–1960); Double-A (1908–1945); Class A (1902–1907)
- League: American Association (1902–1960): Western League (1901); American League (1900); Western League (1894–1899); Western Association (1888–1891); Northwestern League (1884, 1886–1887)

Major league affiliations
- Team: Boston Red Sox (1958–1960); New York Giants (1946–1957); Boston Red Sox (1936–1938)

Minor league titles
- Class titles (2): 1955; 1958
- League titles (10): 1896; 1910; 1911; 1912; 1915; 1932; 1935; 1955; 1958; 1959

Team data
- Name: Minneapolis Millers
- Ballpark: Metropolitan Stadium Nicollet Park Athletic Park

The Minneapolis Millers were an American professional minor league baseball team that played in Minneapolis, Minnesota, in the top-level American Association through 1960. In the 19th century a different Minneapolis Millers were part of the Western League. The team played first in Athletic Park and later Nicollet Park.

== History ==
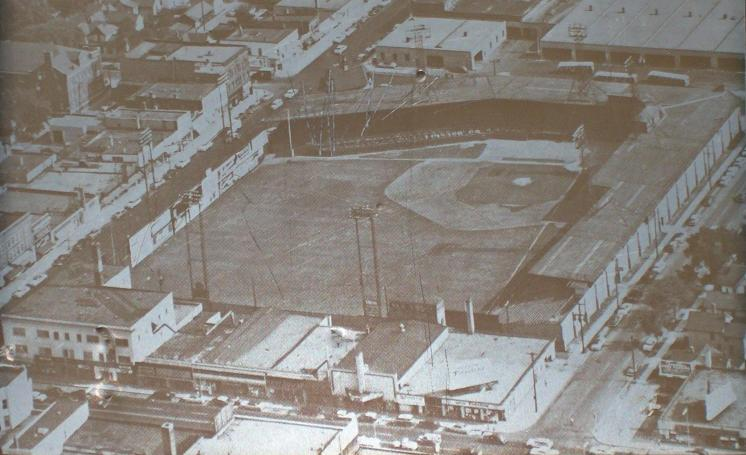
Nicollet Park, home of the Minneapolis Millers

The name Minneapolis Millers has been associated with a variety of professional minor league teams. The original Millers date back to 1884 when the Northwestern League was formed. This league failed and the Western League replaced it, absorbing some of the old teams. According to Stew Thornley, this team folded in 1891 due to financial problems. In 1894, another team calling itself the Millers was formed when Ban Johnson and Charles Comiskey revived the Western League in hopes of making it a second major league. The Millers continued to play in the Western League through 1900, when the name was changed to the American League to give it more of a national image. Following the 1900 season, several cities were abandoned for bigger markets in cities recently vacated by the National League, including Minneapolis. Some teams were transferred, as was the case of the Kansas City Blues franchise to become the Washington Nationals (Senators). However, some of the teams were just left out in the dark. It is unclear which of these two paths the Millers took, but most evidence seems to point toward abandonment, not a transfer to Baltimore as the Orioles, especially given that no player for the 1900 Millers played for the 1901 Orioles.

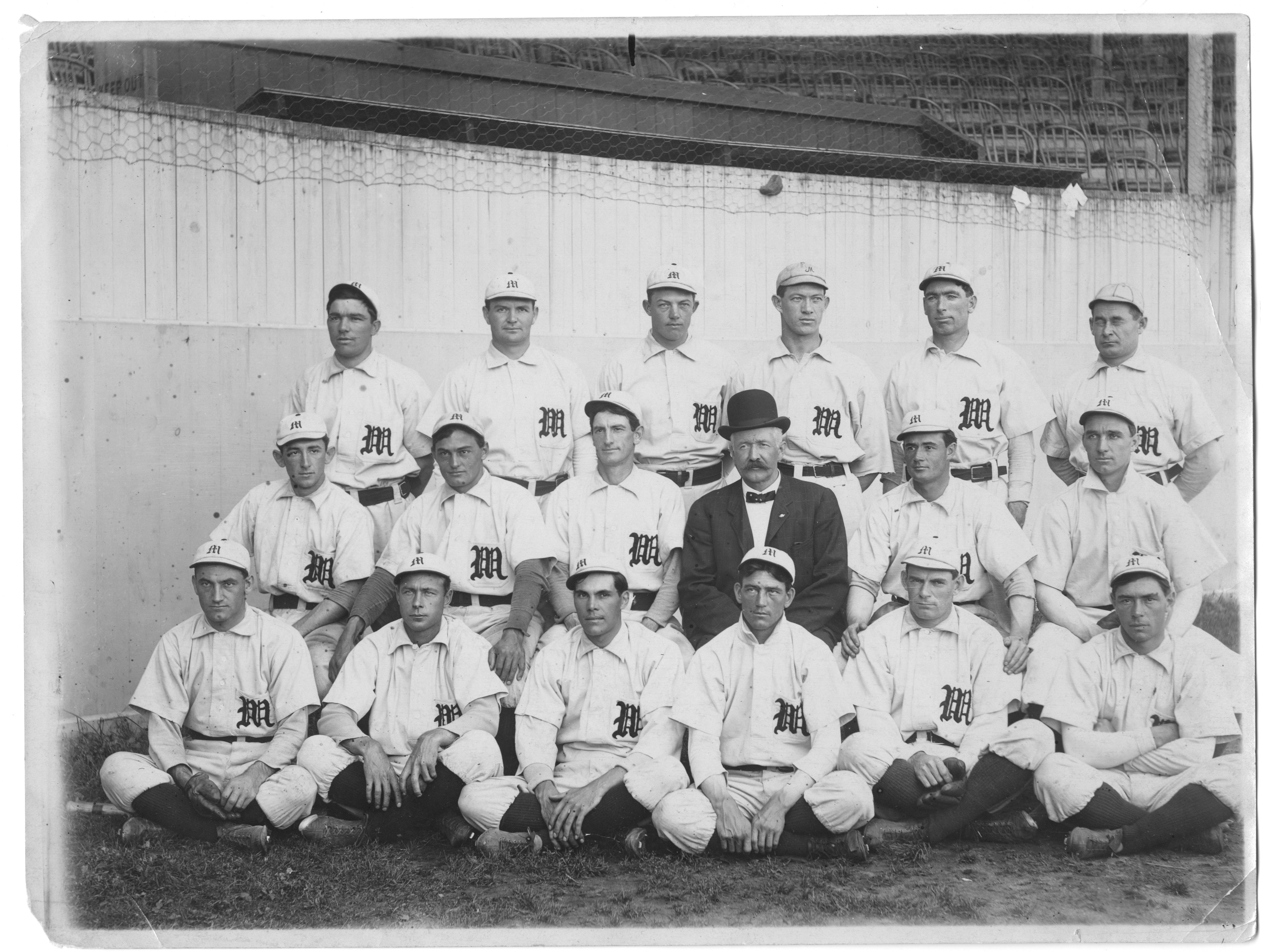
The Minneapolis Millers team in 1904.

Several teams went by the nickname Millers, but the most prominent of these was the team in the American Association from 1902 to 1960. The Millers won four Association pennants during the 1910–23 tenure of "Pongo Joe" Cantillon, then were managed from 1924 to 1931 by another legend, Michael Joseph Kelley, one of the great figures of American Association history. Kelley operated the team as club president until 1946.

Al Sheehan broadcast play-by-play for the Millers live from Nicollet Park, and recreated road games via ticker tape. Broadcaster Halsey Hall was the Millers' play-by-play man from 1933 until the club folded in 1960 to make way for the Minnesota Twins.

Ted Williams, Willie Mays and Carl Yastrzemski were among some future major leaguers who played for the Millers. The Millers won nine pennants in the Association during their fifty-nine years. They played their home games at Nicollet Park until 1955, the ballpark being demolished the following year. That site, at 31st and Nicollet Avenue, is now the home of a Wells Fargo bank. In 1956 they moved into Metropolitan Stadium in Bloomington, until 1960.

They had a heated crosstown rivalry with the St. Paul Saints. The two clubs often played "streetcar double-headers" on holidays, playing one game in each city.

Over the years the Millers were participants in four Junior World Series; matchups between the champions of the American Association and the International League. In the 1932 championship, the team was defeated by the Newark Bears 4 games to 2. The Millers, under manager Bill Rigney, clinched the 1955 series against the Rochester Red Wings, 4 games to 3, in the final ball game played at Nicollet Park. In 1958, the Millers, with Gene Mauch as skipper, beat the Montreal Royals 4 games to 0. Their last appearance in this Series was in 1959, with Mauch as manager, when the Millers lost the series 4 games to 3 to the Havana Sugar Kings.

After the farm system era began, the Millers were top-level affiliates of the Boston Red Sox (1936–38; 1958–60) and New York Giants (1946–57). It returned to the Red Sox organization as a result of a swap on October 15, 1957 with the San Francisco Seals as part of the Giants' move to the Bay Area.

The Millers ceased operations after the 1960 season with the arrival of the Minnesota Twins in 1961. The Red Sox affiliated with the Pacific Coast League's Seattle Rainiers for 1961. The Millers ended with an overall record of 4,800–4,365. Through the years, Millers pitchers threw seven no-hitters, and a Miller batter was the league-leader in home runs twenty-one times and RBIs nine times.

== Notable players ==
Numerous famous baseball players, managers and coaches have appeared for the Minneapolis Millers as players at some point in their careers, these players include:

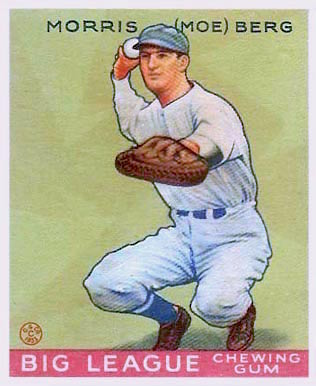
Moe Berg

Hall of Fame alumni

- Orlando Cepeda (1957)
- Jimmy Collins (1909)
- Ray Dandridge (1949–1952)
- Red Faber (1911–12)
- George Kelly (1930–1931)
- Billy Herman (1948)
- Monte Irvin (1955)
- Willie Mays (1951)
- Rube Waddell (1911–1912)
- Zack Wheat (1928)
- Hoyt Wilhelm (1950–1951)
- Ted Williams (1938)
- Carl Yastrzemski (1960)

Notable alumni

- Felipe Alou (1957)
- Nick Altrock (1909–1911)
- Moe Berg (1924)
- Ossie Bluege (1922)
- Sam Bohne (originally "Sam Cohen") (1927–29)
- Zeke Bonura (1941)
- Ralph Branca (1955)
- Galen Cisco (1960)
- Roger Bresnahan (1898–1899)
- Gavvy Cravath (1909–1911)
- Hughie Critz (1923–1924)
- Jim Davenport (1957)
- Chuck Dressen (1931)
- Hobe Ferris (1910–1912)
- Buck Freeman (1907–1908)
- Mike González (1930)
- Bubbles Hargrave (1931)
- Long Tom Hughes (1909–10, 1918)
- Ad Liska (1928)
- Bill McKechnie (1921)
- Gene Mauch (1958–1959)
- Bill Monbouquette (1958)
- Cy Morgan (1904)
- Bob Meusel (1931)
- Stu Miller (1957)
- Billy Muffett (1959–1960)
- Deacon Phillippe (1897–1898)
- Dick Radatz (1960)
- Paul Richards (1932)
- Bill Rigney (1954–1955)
- Don Schwall (1960)
- Chuck Schilling (1960)
- Haywood Sullivan (1959–1960)
- Chuck Tanner (1959)
- Hank Thompson (1957)
- Phil Weintraub (1939–40)
- Wes Westrum (1941–1942, 1947)
- Earl Wilson (1959–1960)
- Bill White (1956)
- Al Worthington (1953–1955, 1960)

== Bibliography ==
- Before the Dome, Nodin Press, 1993, edited by David Anderson.
- On to Nicollet: The Glory and Fame of the Minneapolis Millers, Nodin Press, 1988, by Stew Thornley.
- Ballparks of North America, McFarland & Company, 1989, by Michael Benson.
- Green Cathedrals, SABR, 1986, and Addison-Wesley, 1992, by Phil Lowry.
- Baseball-Reference.com providing information regarding team rosters and players by individual years

Preceded by San Francisco Seals (Open Classification)	Boston Red Sox; Triple-A affiliate 1958–1960	Succeeded by Seattle Rainiers
Preceded by Jersey City Giants	New York Giants; Triple-A affiliate 1946–1957 (with Jersey City Giants, 1946–1950) (with Ottawa Giants, 1951)	Succeeded by Phoenix Giants
Preceded by San Diego Padres & Syracuse Chiefs (1936)	Boston Red Sox; Double-A affiliate 1938	Succeeded by Louisville Colonels
