= 1884 Washington Nationals (UA) season =

1884 Washington Nationals
- League: Union Association
- Ballpark: Capitol Grounds
- City: Washington, D.C.
- Record: 47–65 (.420)
- League place: 7th
- Manager: Michael Scanlon

The 1884 Washington Nationals finished with a 47–65 record in the Union Association, finishing in seventh place. This was the only season the team existed, and indeed the only season the Union Association existed.

== Regular season ==
=== Season standings ===
Union Association
| Team | W | L | Pct. | GB | Home | Road |
|---|---|---|---|---|---|---|
| St. Louis Maroons | 94 | 19 | .832 | — | 49‍–‍6 | 45‍–‍13 |
| Cincinnati Outlaw Reds | 69 | 36 | .657 | 21 | 35‍–‍17 | 34‍–‍19 |
| Baltimore Monumentals | 58 | 47 | .552 | 32 | 29‍–‍21 | 29‍–‍26 |
| Boston Reds | 58 | 51 | .532 | 34 | 34‍–‍22 | 24‍–‍29 |
| Milwaukee Brewers | 8 | 4 | .667 | 35½ | 8‍–‍4 | 0‍–‍0 |
| St. Paul Saints | 2 | 6 | .250 | 39½ | 0‍–‍0 | 2‍–‍6 |
| Chicago Browns/Pittsburgh Stogies | 41 | 50 | .451 | 42 | 21‍–‍19 | 20‍–‍31 |
| Altoona Mountain Citys | 6 | 19 | .240 | 44 | 6‍–‍12 | 0‍–‍7 |
| Wilmington Quicksteps | 2 | 16 | .111 | 44½ | 1‍–‍6 | 1‍–‍10 |
| Washington Nationals (UA) | 47 | 65 | .420 | 46½ | 36‍–‍27 | 11‍–‍38 |
| Philadelphia Keystones | 21 | 46 | .313 | 50 | 14‍–‍21 | 7‍–‍25 |
| Kansas City Cowboys | 16 | 63 | .203 | 61 | 11‍–‍23 | 5‍–‍40 |

=== Record vs. opponents ===
1884 Union Association record Sources:
| Team | ALT | BLU | BSU | CUN | COR | KC | MIL | PHK | SLM | SPS | WST | WIL |
|---|---|---|---|---|---|---|---|---|---|---|---|---|
| Altoona | — | 1–3 | 1–1 | 0–0 | 0–3 | 0–0 | 0–0 | 1–3 | 0–8 | 0–0 | 3–1 | 0–0 |
| Baltimore | 3–1 | — | 10–5–1 | 7–5 | 4–10 | 10–2 | 1–3 | 10–2 | 1–14 | 0–0 | 11–5 | 1–0 |
| Boston | 1–1 | 5–10–1 | — | 4–8–1 | 5–11 | 8–4 | 2–2 | 8–3 | 8–8 | 0–0 | 12–4 | 5–0 |
| Chicago/Pittsburgh | 0–0 | 5–7 | 8–4–1 | — | 7–8 | 12–4 | 0–0 | 3–5 | 2–14 | 0–0 | 4–8–1 | 0–0 |
| Cincinnati | 3–0 | 10–4 | 11–5 | 8–7 | — | 9–1 | 0–0 | 9–0 | 4–12 | 3–0 | 10–6 | 2–1 |
| Kansas City | 0–0 | 2–10 | 4–8 | 4–12 | 1–9 | — | 0–0 | 0–4 | 0–11–1 | 1–1–1 | 4–8–1 | 0–0 |
| Milwaukee | 0–0 | 3–1 | 2–2 | 0–0 | 0–0 | 0–0 | — | 0–0 | 0–0 | 0–0 | 3–1 | 0–0 |
| Philadelphia | 3–1 | 2–10 | 3–8 | 5–3 | 0–9 | 4–0 | 0–0 | — | 0–8 | 0–0 | 4–7 | 0–0 |
| St. Louis | 8–0 | 14–1 | 8–8 | 14–2 | 12–4 | 11–0–1 | 0–0 | 8–0 | — | 2–1 | 13–3 | 4–0 |
| St. Paul | 0–0 | 0–0 | 0–0 | 0–0 | 0–3 | 1–1–1 | 0–0 | 0–0 | 1–2 | — | 0–0 | 0–0 |
| Washington | 1–3 | 5–11 | 4–12 | 8–4–1 | 6–10 | 8–4–1 | 1–3 | 7–4 | 3–13 | 0–0 | — | 4–1 |
| Wilmington | 0–0 | 0–1 | 0–5 | 0–0 | 1–2 | 0–0 | 0–0 | 0–0 | 0–4 | 0–0 | 1–4 | — |

=== Roster ===
1884 Washington Nationals
Roster
| Pitchers: Hugh Daily; Charlie Geggus; Fred Tenney; Alex Voss; Bill Wise; Catchers: Chris Fulmer; Joe Gunson; John Kelly; Mike Lawlor; Jim McDonald; Ed McKenna; Bill Rollinson | Infielders: Gus Alberts; Phil Baker; John Deasley; Dave Drew; Tom Evers; Jim Green; Jim Halpin; Bill Hughes; Pop Joy; Patrick Larkins; James Lehan; Charlie Levis; Jerry McCormick; William McLaughlin; Peter Morris; John Mulligan; Maury Pierce; Walter Prince; Warren White; Joseph Wiley; Ed Yewell | Outfielders: Al Bradley; Chick Carroll; Mark Creegan; John Ewing; Franklin; Charlie Kalbfus; Milo Lockwood; Frank McKee; McRemer; Henry Moore; Emory Nusz; Frank Olin; Abner Powell; Icicle Reeder; Dan Sheahan; John Shoupe; Thomas Tinney; John Ward | Manager: Michael Scanlon |

== Player stats ==
=== Batting ===
==== Starters by position ====
Note: Pos = Position; G = Games played; AB = At bats; H = Hits; Avg. = Batting average; HR = Home runs

| Pos | Player | G | AB | H | Avg. | HR |
|---|---|---|---|---|---|---|
| C | Chris Fulmer | 48 | 181 | 50 | .276 | 0 |
| 1B | Phil Baker | 86 | 371 | 107 | .288 | 1 |
| 2B | Tom Evers | 109 | 427 | 99 | .232 | 0 |
| SS | Jim Halpin | 46 | 168 | 31 | .185 | 0 |
| 3B | Jerry McCormick | 42 | 157 | 34 | .217 | 0 |
| OF | Bill Wise | 85 | 339 | 79 | .233 | 2 |
| OF | Henry Moore | 111 | 461 | 155 | .336 | 1 |
| OF | Abner Powell | 48 | 191 | 54 | .283 | 0 |

==== Other batters ====
Note: G = Games played; AB = At bats; H = Hits; Avg. = Batting average; HR = Home runs

| Player | G | AB | H | Avg. | HR |
|---|---|---|---|---|---|
| Alex Voss | 63 | 245 | 47 | .192 | 0 |
| Abner Powell | 48 | 191 | 54 | .283 | 0 |
| Joe Gunson | 45 | 166 | 23 | .139 | 0 |
| John Deasley | 31 | 134 | 29 | .216 | 0 |
| Pop Joy | 36 | 130 | 28 | .215 | 0 |
| Thomas Tinney | 32 | 119 | 28 | .235 | 0 |
| Ed McKenna | 32 | 117 | 22 | .188 | 0 |
| Patrick Larkins | 17 | 70 | 17 | .243 | 0 |
| Milo Lockwood | 20 | 67 | 14 | .209 | 0 |
| Dave Drew | 13 | 53 | 16 | .302 | 0 |
| Bill Hughes | 14 | 49 | 6 | .122 | 0 |
| William McLaughlin | 10 | 37 | 7 | .189 | 0 |
| Jim Green | 10 | 36 | 5 | .139 | 0 |
| Mark Creegan | 9 | 33 | 5 | .152 | 0 |
| Dan Sheahan | 7 | 28 | 4 | .143 | 0 |
| Warren White | 4 | 18 | 1 | .056 | 0 |
| Frank McKee | 4 | 17 | 3 | .176 | 0 |
| Gus Alberts | 4 | 16 | 4 | .250 | 0 |
| John Kelly | 4 | 14 | 5 | .357 | 0 |
| James Lehan | 3 | 12 | 4 | .333 | 0 |
| Icicle Reeder | 3 | 12 | 2 | .167 | 0 |
| Mike Lawlor | 2 | 7 | 0 | .000 | 0 |
| Maury Pierce | 2 | 7 | 1 | .143 | 0 |
| Jim McDonald | 2 | 6 | 1 | .167 | 0 |
| John Ewing | 1 | 5 | 1 | .200 | 0 |
| Charlie Kalbfus | 1 | 5 | 1 | .200 | 0 |
| Ed Yewell | 1 | 4 | 0 | .000 | 0 |
| John Mulligan | 1 | 4 | 1 | .250 | 0 |
| Walter Prince | 1 | 4 | 1 | .250 | 0 |
| John Shoup | 1 | 4 | 3 | .750 | 0 |
| John Ward | 1 | 4 | 1 | .250 | 0 |
| Frank Olin | 1 | 4 | 0 | .000 | 0 |
| Emory Nusz | 1 | 4 | 0 | .000 | 0 |
| Joseph Wiley | 1 | 4 | 0 | .000 | 0 |
| Peter Morris | 1 | 3 | 0 | .000 | 0 |
| Al Bradley | 1 | 3 | 0 | .000 | 0 |
| McRemer | 1 | 3 | 0 | .000 | 0 |
| Bill Rollinson | 1 | 3 | 0 | .000 | 0 |
| Franklin | 1 | 3 | 0 | .000 | 0 |
| Charlie Levis | 1 | 3 | 0 | .000 | 0 |

=== Pitching ===
==== Starting pitchers ====
Note: G = Games pitched; IP = Innings pitched; W = Wins; L = Losses; ERA = Earned run average; SO = Strikeouts

| Player | G | IP | W | L | ERA | SO |
|---|---|---|---|---|---|---|
| Bill Wise | 50 | 364.1 | 23 | 18 | 3.04 | 268 |
| Alex Voss | 27 | 186.1 | 5 | 14 | 3.57 | 112 |
| Charlie Geggus | 23 | 177.1 | 10 | 9 | 2.54 | 156 |
| Abner Powell | 18 | 134.0 | 6 | 12 | 3.43 | 78 |
| Milo Lockwood | 11 | 67.2 | 1 | 9 | 7.45 | 48 |
| Hugh Daily | 2 | 16.0 | 1 | 1 | 2.25 | 14 |
| Fred Tenney | 1 | 8.0 | 0 | 1 | 6.75 | 8 |
