= List of Major League Baseball players (Mc–Me) =

The following is a list of Major League Baseball players, retired or active.

== Mc-Mg ==
Name	Debut	Final game	Position	Teams	Ref
Jack McAdams	July 22, 1911	September 4, 1911	Pitcher	St. Louis Cardinals	
Bill McAfee	May 12, 1930	September 22, 1934	Pitcher	Chicago Cubs, Boston Braves, Washington Senators, St. Louis Browns	
Jimmy McAleer	April 24, 1889	July 8, 1907	Outfielder	Cleveland Spiders, Cleveland Infants, Cleveland Blues (AL), St. Louis Browns	
Jack McAleese	August 10, 1901	October 3, 1909	Outfielder	Chicago White Sox, St. Louis Browns	
Bill McAllester	May 2, 1913	October 5, 1913	Catcher	St. Louis Browns	
Sport McAllister	August 7, 1896	September 29, 1903	Utility player	Cleveland Spiders, Detroit Tigers, Baltimore Orioles	
Zach McAllister	July 7, 2011		Pitcher	Cleveland Indians	
Ernie McAnally	April 11, 1971	September 10, 1974	Pitcher	Montreal Expos	
Jim McAnany	September 19, 1958	August 25, 1962	Outfielder	Chicago White Sox, Chicago Cubs	
Jamie McAndrew	July 17, 1995	July 23, 1997	Pitcher	Milwaukee Brewers	
Jim McAndrew	July 21, 1968	May 29, 1974	Pitcher	New York Mets, San Diego Padres	
Paul McAnulty	June 22, 2005		Outfielder	San Diego Padres, Los Angeles Angels of Anaheim	
Dixie McArthur	July 10, 1914	July 10, 1914	Pitcher	Pittsburgh Pirates	
Bub McAtee	May 8, 1871	July 23, 1872	First baseman	Chicago White Stockings, Troy Haymakers	
Ike McAuley	September 10, 1914	May 30, 1925	Shortstop	Pittsburgh Pirates, St. Louis Cardinals, Chicago Cubs	
Dick McAuliffe	September 17, 1960	September 1, 1975	Utility infielder	Detroit Tigers, Boston Red Sox	
Gene McAuliffe	August 17, 1904	August 17, 1904	Catcher	Boston Beaneaters	
George McAvoy	July 17, 1914	July 17, 1914	Pinch hitter	Philadelphia Phillies	
Tom McAvoy	September 27, 1959	September 27, 1959	Pitcher	Washington Senators	
Wickey McAvoy	September 29, 1913	September 16, 1919	Catcher	Philadelphia Athletics	
Al McBean	July 2, 1961	May 10, 1970	Pitcher	Pittsburgh Pirates, San Diego Padres, Los Angeles Dodgers	
Pryor McBee	May 22, 1926	May 22, 1926	Pitcher	Chicago White Sox	
Marcus McBeth	June 6, 2007		Pitcher	Cincinnati Reds	
McBride, first name unknown	October 12, 1890	October 12, 1890	Outfielder	Philadelphia Athletics (AA)	
Algie McBride	May 12, 1896	September 16, 1901	Outfielder	Chicago Colts, Cincinnati Reds, New York Giants	
Bake McBride	July 26, 1973	October 1, 1983	Outfielder	St. Louis Cardinals, Philadelphia Phillies, Cleveland Indians	
Dick McBride	May 20, 1871	July 13, 1876	Pitcher	Philadelphia Athletics (1860–76), Boston Red Caps	
George McBride	September 12, 1901	July 29, 1920	Shortstop	Milwaukee Brewers (1901), Pittsburgh Pirates, St. Louis Cardinals, Washington Senators	
Ken McBride	August 4, 1959	August 15, 1965	Pitcher	Chicago White Sox, Los Angeles/California Angels	
Macay McBride	July 22, 2005	August 10, 2007	Pitcher	Atlanta Braves, Detroit Tigers	
Pete McBride	September 20, 1898	September 14, 1899	Pitcher	Cleveland Spiders, St. Louis Perfectos	
Tom McBride	April 23, 1943	September 30, 1948	Outfielder	Boston Red Sox, Washington Senators	
Bill McCabe	April 16, 1918	October 3, 1920	Utility player	Chicago Cubs, Brooklyn Robins	
Dick McCabe	May 30, 1918	June 21, 1922	Pitcher	Boston Red Sox, Chicago White Sox	
Joe McCabe	April 18, 1964	May 22, 1965	Catcher	Minnesota Twins, Washington Senators	
Ralph McCabe	September 18, 1946	September 18, 1946	Pitcher	Cleveland Indians	
Swat McCabe	September 23, 1909	May 20, 1910	Outfielder	Cincinnati Reds	
Tim McCabe	August 16, 1915	July 27, 1918	Pitcher	St. Louis Browns	
Harry McCaffery	June 15, 1882	June 25, 1883	Outfielder	St. Louis Brown Stockings (AA), Louisville Eclipse	
Sparrow McCaffrey	August 13, 1889	August 15, 1889	Catcher	Columbus Solons	
William McCaffrey	June 15, 1885	June 15, 1885	Pitcher	Cincinnati Red Stockings (AA)	
Bill McCahan	September 15, 1946	June 19, 1949	Pitcher	Philadelphia Athletics	
Brian McCall	September 18, 1962	September 29, 1963	Outfielder	Chicago White Sox	
Dutch McCall	April 27, 1948	October 3, 1948	Pitcher	Chicago Cubs	
Larry McCall	September 10, 1977	September 27, 1979	Pitcher	New York Yankees, Texas Rangers	
Windy McCall	April 25, 1948	May 5, 1957	Pitcher	Boston Red Sox, Pittsburgh Pirates, San Francisco Giants	
Randy McCament	June 28, 1989	May 21, 1990	Pitcher	San Francisco Giants	
Jack McCandless	September 10, 1914	October 3, 1915	Outfielder	Baltimore Terrapins	
Brian McCann	June 10, 2005		Catcher	Atlanta Braves	
Emmett McCann	April 19, 1920	May 23, 1926	Shortstop	Philadelphia Athletics, Boston Red Sox	
Gene McCann	April 19, 1901	April 28, 1902	Pitcher	Brooklyn Superbas	
Roger McCardell	May 8, 1959	June 8, 1959	Catcher	San Francisco Giants	
Bill McCarren	May 4, 1923	August 23, 1923	Third baseman	Brooklyn Robins	
Alex McCarthy	October 7, 1910	July 23, 1917	Second baseman	Pittsburgh Pirates, Chicago Cubs	
Arch McCarthy	August 14, 1902	September 18, 1902	Pitcher	Detroit Tigers	
Bill McCarthy	June 5, 1905	September 14, 1907	Catcher	Boston Beaneaters, Cincinnati Reds	
Brandon McCarthy	May 22, 2005		Pitcher	Chicago White Sox, Texas Rangers, Oakland Athletics	
Greg McCarthy	August 28, 1996	September 23, 1998	Pitcher	Seattle Mariners	
Jack McCarthy	August 3, 1893	May 25, 1907	Outfielder	Cincinnati Reds, Pittsburgh Pirates, Chicago Orphans, Cleveland Blues (AL)/Bronchos/Naps, Chicago Cubs, Brooklyn Superbas	
Jerry McCarthy	June 19, 1948	June 23, 1948	First baseman	St. Louis Browns	
Joe McCarthy	September 27, 1905	July 8, 1906	Catcher	New York Highlanders, St. Louis Cardinals	
Johnny McCarthy	September 2, 1934	September 26, 1948	First baseman	Brooklyn Dodgers, New York Giants, Boston Braves	
Tom McCarthy (1900s P)	May 10, 1908	July 7, 1909	Pitcher	Cincinnati Reds, Pittsburgh Pirates, Boston Doves	
Tom McCarthy (1980s P)	July 5, 1985	September 22, 1989	Pitcher	Boston Red Sox, Chicago White Sox	
Tommy McCarthy β	July 10, 1884	September 26, 1896	Outfielder	Boston Reds (UA), Boston Beaneaters, Philadelphia Quakers, St. Louis Browns, Brooklyn Bridegrooms	
William McCarthy	April 21, 1906	April 21, 1906	Pitcher	Boston Beaneaters	
Frank McCarton	April 26, 1872	August 5, 1872	Outfielder	Middletown Mansfields	
David McCarty	May 17, 1993	May 1, 2005	First baseman	Minnesota Twins, San Francisco Giants, Seattle Mariners, Kansas City Royals, Tampa Bay Rays, Oakland Athletics, Boston Red Sox	
John McCarty	April 18, 1889	July 7, 1889	Pitcher	Kansas City Cowboys (AA)	
Lew McCarty	August 30, 1913	April 13, 1921	Catcher	Brooklyn Superbas/Robins, New York Giants, St. Louis Cardinals	
Tim McCarver	September 10, 1959	October 5, 1980	Catcher	St. Louis Cardinals, Philadelphia Phillies, Montreal Expos, Boston Red Sox	
Kirk McCaskill	May 1, 1985	July 20, 1996	Pitcher	California Angels, Chicago White Sox	
Steve McCatty	September 17, 1977	September 25, 1985	Pitcher	Oakland Athletics	
Al McCauley	June 21, 1884	October 6, 1891	First baseman	Indianapolis Hoosiers (AA), Philadelphia Phillies, Washington Statesmen	
Bill McCauley	August 31, 1895	August 31, 1895	Shortstop	Washington Senators (NL)	
Jim McCauley	September 17, 1884	July 15, 1886	Catcher	St. Louis Browns (AA), Buffalo Bisons (NL), Chicago White Stockings, Brooklyn Grays	
Pat McCauley	September 5, 1893	September 3, 1903	Catcher	St. Louis Browns (NL), Washington Senators (NL), New York Highlanders	
Harry McChesney	September 17, 1904	October 9, 1904	Outfielder	Chicago Cubs	
Joe McClain	April 14, 1961	June 1, 1962	Pitcher	Washington Senators (1961–71)	
Scott McClain	May 14, 1998		First baseman	Tampa Bay Devil Rays, Chicago Cubs, San Francisco Giants	
Pete McClanahan	April 14, 1931	May 28, 1931	Pinch hitter	Pittsburgh Pirates	
Bill McClellan	May 20, 1878	October 17, 1888	Second baseman	Chicago White Stockings, Providence Grays, Brooklyn Grays/Bridegrooms, Cleveland Blues	
Hervey McClellan	May 31, 1919	September 29, 1924	Shortstop	Chicago White Sox	
Kyle McClellan	April 1, 2008		Pitcher	St. Louis Cardinals	
Paul McClellan	September 2, 1990	October 6, 1991	Pitcher	San Francisco Giants	
Zach McClellan	April 16, 2007	May 13, 2007	Pitcher	Colorado Rockies	
Lloyd McClendon	April 6, 1987	August 11, 1994	Outfielder	Cincinnati Reds, Chicago Cubs, Pittsburgh Pirates	
Mike McClendon	August 14, 2010		Pitcher	Milwaukee Brewers	
Jeff McCleskey	September 8, 1913	September 13, 1913	Third baseman	Boston Braves	
McCloskey, first name unknown	May 25, 1875	July 4, 1875	Catcher	Washington Nationals (NA)	
Bill McCloskey	August 18, 1884	September 9, 1884	Utility player	Wilmington Quicksteps	
Jim McCloskey	April 21, 1936	May 12, 1936	Pitcher	Boston Bees	
John McCloskey	May 3, 1906	May 31, 1907	Pitcher	Philadelphia Phillies	
Seth McClung	March 31, 2003		Pitcher	Tampa Bay Devil Rays, Milwaukee Brewers	
Bob McClure	August 13, 1975	May 17, 1993	Pitcher	Kansas City Royals, Milwaukee Brewers, Montreal Expos, New York Mets, California Angels, St. Louis Cardinals, Florida Marlins	
Hal McClure	May 10, 1882	May 11, 1882	Outfielder	Boston Red Caps	
Larry McClure	July 26, 1910	July 26, 1910	Outfielder	New York Highlanders	
Harry McCluskey	July 29, 1915	August 20, 1915	Pitcher	Cincinnati Reds	
Alex McColl	August 27, 1933	September 29, 1934	Pitcher	Washington Senators	
Ralph McConnaughey	July 8, 1914	August 11, 1914	Pitcher	Indianapolis Hoosiers (FL)	
Amby McConnell	April 17, 1908	October 8, 1911	Second baseman	Boston Red Sox, Chicago White Sox	
George McConnell	April 13, 1909	September 26, 1916	Pitcher	New York Highlanders/Yankees, Chicago Cubs, Chicago Whales	
Sam McConnell (3B)	April 19, 1915	May 17, 1915	Third baseman	Philadelphia Athletics	
Sam McConnell (P)	June 25, 2004	July 27, 2004	Pitcher	Atlanta Braves	
Billy McCool	April 24, 1964	July 8, 1970	Pitcher	Cincinnati Reds, San Diego Padres, St. Louis Cardinals	
Don McCormack	September 30, 1980	October 4, 1981	Catcher	Philadelphia Phillies	
Barry McCormick	September 25, 1895	August 30, 1904	Utility infielder	Louisville Colonels, Chicago Colts/Orphans, St. Louis Browns, Washington Senators	
Frank McCormick	September 11, 1934	October 3, 1948	First baseman	Cincinnati Reds, Philadelphia Phillies, Boston Braves	
Harry McCormick	May 1, 1879	September 20, 1883	Pitcher	Syracuse Stars (NL), Worcester Ruby Legs, Cincinnati Red Stockings (AA)	
Jerry McCormick	May 1, 1883	October 19, 1884	Third baseman	Baltimore Orioles (AA), Philadelphia Keystones, Washington Nationals (UA)	
Jim McCormick (P)	May 20, 1878	October 7, 1887	Pitcher	Indianapolis Blues, Cleveland Blues (NL), Cincinnati Outlaw Reds, Providence Grays, Chicago White Stockings, Pittsburgh Alleghenys	
Jim McCormick (IF)	September 10, 1892	September 10, 1892	Second baseman	St. Louis Browns (NL)	
Mike McCormick (3B)	April 14, 1904	August 31, 1904	Third baseman	Brooklyn Superbas	
Mike McCormick (OF)	April 16, 1940	September 30, 1951	Outfielder	Cincinnati Reds, Boston Braves, Brooklyn Dodgers, New York Giants, Chicago White Sox, Washington Senators	
Mike McCormick (P)	September 3, 1956	May 22, 1971	Pitcher	New York/San Francisco Giants, Baltimore Orioles, Washington Senators (1961–71), New York Yankees, Kansas City Royals	
Moose McCormick	April 14, 1904	October 4, 1913	Outfielder	New York Giants, Pittsburgh Pirates, Philadelphia Phillies	
Bill McCorry	September 17, 1909	September 29, 1909	Pitcher	St. Louis Browns	
Barney McCosky	April 18, 1939	July 8, 1953	Outfielder	Detroit Tigers, Philadelphia Athletics, Cincinnati Reds, Cleveland Indians	
Willie McCovey β	July 30, 1959	July 6, 1980	First baseman	San Francisco Giants, San Diego Padres, Oakland Athletics	
Art McCoy	July 8, 1889	July 9, 1889	Second baseman	Washington Nationals (1886–1889)	
Benny McCoy	September 14, 1938	September 28, 1941	Second baseman	Detroit Tigers, Philadelphia Athletics	
Mike McCoy	September 9, 2009		Utility player	Colorado Rockies, Toronto Blue Jays	
Les McCrabb	September 7, 1939	May 4, 1950	Pitcher	Philadelphia Athletics	
Quinton McCracken	September 17, 1995	July 5, 2006	Outfielder	Colorado Rockies, Tampa Bay Devil Rays, Minnesota Twins, Arizona Diamondbacks, Seattle Mariners, Cincinnati Reds	
Tommy McCraw	June 4, 1963	June 24, 1975	First baseman	Chicago White Sox, Washington Senators (1961–71), Cleveland Indians, California Angels	
Rodney McCray	April 30, 1990	May 11, 1992	Outfielder	Chicago White Sox, New York Mets	
Frank McCrea	September 26, 1925	September 26, 1925	Catcher	Cleveland Indians	
Walter McCredie	April 20, 1903	June 27, 1903	Outfielder	Brooklyn Superbas	
Ed McCreery	August 16, 1914	August 27, 1914	Pitcher	Detroit Tigers	
Tom McCreery	June 8, 1895	September 27, 1903	Outfielder	Louisville Colonels, New York Giants, Pittsburgh Pirates, Brooklyn Superbas, Boston Beaneaters	
Bob McCrory	April 30, 2008		Pitcher	Baltimore Orioles	
Frank McCue	September 15, 1922	September 22, 1922	Third baseman	Philadelphia Athletics	
Lance McCullers	August 12, 1985	June 4, 1992	Pitcher	San Diego Padres, New York Yankees, Detroit Tigers, Texas Rangers	
Charlie McCullough	April 23, 1890	August 29, 1890	Pitcher	Brooklyn Gladiators, Syracuse Stars (AA)	
Clyde McCullough	April 28, 1940	July 22, 1956	Catcher	Chicago Cubs, Pittsburgh Pirates	
Paul McCullough	July 2, 1929	July 8, 1929	Pitcher	Washington Senators	
Phil McCullough	April 22, 1942	April 22, 1942	Pitcher	Washington Senators	
Harry McCurdy	July 1, 1922	July 1, 1934	Catcher	St. Louis Cardinals, Chicago White Sox, Philadelphia Phillies, Cincinnati Reds	
Jeff McCurry	May 6, 1995	June 22, 1999	Pitcher	Pittsburgh Pirates, Detroit Tigers, Colorado Rockies, Houston Astros	
Andrew McCutchen	June 4, 2009		Outfielder	Pittsburgh Pirates	
Daniel McCutchen	August 31, 2009		Pitcher	Pittsburgh Pirates	
Lindy McDaniel	September 2, 1955	September 27, 1955	Pitcher	St. Louis Cardinals, Chicago Cubs, San Francisco Giants, New York Yankees, Kansas City Royals	
Terry McDaniel	August 30, 1991	October 4, 1991	Outfielder	New York Mets	
Von McDaniel	June 13, 1957	May 11, 1958	Pitcher	St. Louis Cardinals	
Ray McDavid	July 15, 1994	October 1, 1995	Outfielder	San Diego Padres	
Joe McDermott	May 4, 1871	July 6, 1872	Pitcher	Fort Wayne Kekiongas, Eckford of Brooklyn	
Michael McDermott	September 2, 1889	October 13, 1889	Pitcher	Louisville Colonels	
Mickey McDermott	April 24, 1948	August 10, 1961	Pitcher	Boston Red Sox, Washington Senators, New York Yankees, Kansas City Athletics, Detroit Tigers, St. Louis Cardinals	
Mike McDermott	April 20, 1895	July 31, 1897	Pitcher	Louisville Colonels, Cleveland Spiders, St. Louis Browns (NL)	
Red McDermott	August 6, 1912	August 8, 1912	Outfielder	Detroit Tigers	
Sandy McDermott	June 18, 1885	June 18, 1885	Second baseman	Baltimore Orioles (AA)	
Terry McDermott	September 12, 1972	September 26, 1972	First baseman	Los Angeles Dodgers	
Danny McDevitt	June 17, 1957	September 19, 1962	Pitcher	Brooklyn/Los Angeles Dodgers, New York Yankees, Minnesota Twins, Kansas City Athletics	
Allen McDill	May 15, 1997	October 2, 2001	Pitcher	Kansas City Royals, Detroit Tigers, Boston Red Sox	
Ben McDonald	August 19, 1989	July 16, 1997	Pitcher	Baltimore Orioles, Milwaukee Brewers	
Darnell McDonald	April 30, 2004		Outfielder	Baltimore Orioles, Minnesota Twins, Cincinnati Reds, Boston Red Sox	
Dave McDonald	September 15, 1969	September 26, 1971	First baseman	New York Yankees, Montreal Expos	
Donzell McDonald	April 19, 2001	June 21, 2002	Outfielder	New York Yankees, Kansas City Royals	
Ed McDonald	August 5, 1911	April 15, 1913	Third baseman	Boston Rustlers/Braves, Chicago Cubs	
Hank McDonald	April 16, 1931	September 30, 1933	Pitcher	Philadelphia Athletics, St. Louis Browns	
Jack McDonald	May 2, 1872	May 18, 1872	Outfielder	Brooklyn Atlantics, Eckford of Brooklyn	
James McDonald	September 17, 2008		Pitcher	Los Angeles Dodgers, Pittsburgh Pirates	
Jason McDonald	June 5, 1997	June 9, 2000	Outfielder	Oakland Athletics, Texas Rangers	
Jim McDonald (3B)	June 20, 1884	October 10, 1885	Utility player	Washington Nationals (UA), Pittsburgh Alleghenys, Buffalo Bisons (NL)	
Jim McDonald (OF)	June 2, 1902	June 3, 1902	Outfielder	New York Giants	
Jim McDonald (P)	July 27, 1950	April 26, 1958	Pitcher	Boston Red Sox, St. Louis Browns, New York Yankees, Baltimore Orioles, Chicago White Sox	
Joe McDonald	September 6, 1910	September 14, 1910	Third baseman	St. Louis Browns	
John McDonald (P)	September 3, 1907	September 3, 1907	Pitcher	Washington Senators	
John McDonald (SS)	July 4, 1999		Shortstop	Cleveland Indians, Toronto Blue Jays, Detroit Tigers, Arizona Diamondbacks	
Keith McDonald	July 4, 2000	September 28, 2001	Catcher	St. Louis Cardinals	
Tex McDonald	April 11, 1912	August 14, 1915	Outfielder	Cincinnati Reds, Boston Braves, Pittsburgh Burghers, Buffalo Buffeds/Blues	
Jim McDonnell	September 23, 1943	September 23, 1945	Catcher	Cleveland Indians	
Ed McDonough	August 3, 1909	October 11, 1910	Catcher	Philadelphia Phillies	
McDoolan, first name unknown	April 14, 1873	April 14, 1873	Pitcher	Baltimore Marylands	
Dewey McDougal	April 24, 1895	May 12, 1896	Pitcher	St. Louis Browns (NL)	
Sandy McDougal	June 12, 1895	October 8, 1905	Pitcher	Brooklyn Grooms, St. Louis Cardinals	
Gil McDougald	April 20, 1951	October 2, 1960	Utility infielder	New York Yankees	
Marshall McDougall	June 7, 2005	October 2, 2005	Utility player	Texas Rangers	
Jack McDowell	September 15, 1987	August 8, 1999	Pitcher	Chicago White Sox, New York Yankees, Cleveland Indians, Anaheim Angels	
Oddibe McDowell	May 19, 1985	August 10, 1994	Outfielder	Texas Rangers, Cleveland Indians, Atlanta Braves	
Roger McDowell	April 11, 1985	August 14, 1996	Pitcher	New York Mets, Philadelphia Phillies, Los Angeles Dodgers, Texas Rangers, Baltimore Orioles	
Sam McDowell	September 15, 1961	June 24, 1975	Pitcher	Cleveland Indians, San Francisco Giants, New York Yankees, Pittsburgh Pirates	
Chuck McElroy	September 4, 1989	October 7, 2001	Pitcher	Philadelphia Phillies, Chicago Cubs, Cincinnati Reds, California/Anaheim Angels, Chicago White Sox, Colorado Rockies, New York Mets, Baltimore Orioles, San Diego Padres	
Jim McElroy	May 26, 1884	August 21, 1884	Pitcher	Philadelphia Phillies, Wilmington Quicksteps	
Pryor McElveen	April 26, 1909	June 4, 1911	Third baseman	Brooklyn Superbas/Dodgers	
Lee McElwee	July 3, 1916	September 28, 1916	Third baseman	Philadelphia Athletics	
Frank McElyea	September 10, 1942	September 26, 1942	Outfielder	Boston Braves	
Will McEnaney	July 3, 1974	September 27, 1979	Pitcher	Cincinnati Reds, Montreal Expos, Pittsburgh Pirates, St. Louis Cardinals	
Lou McEvoy	April 28, 1930	July 26, 1931	Pitcher	New York Yankees	
Joe McEwing	September 2, 1998	May 20, 2006	Utility player	St. Louis Cardinals, New York Mets, Kansas City Royals, Houston Astros	
Barney McFadden	April 24, 1901	September 16, 1902	Pitcher	Cincinnati Reds, Philadelphia Phillies	
Guy McFadden	August 24, 1895	August 28, 1895	First baseman	St. Louis Browns (NL)	
Leon McFadden	September 6, 1968	April 28, 1970	Shortstop	Houston Astros	
Alex McFarlan	June 19, 1892	July 1, 1892	Outfielder	Louisville Colonels	
Dan McFarlan	September 2, 1895	September 29, 1899	Pitcher	Louisville Colonels, Brooklyn Superbas, Washington Senators (NL)	
Chappie McFarland	September 15, 1902	August 7, 1906	Pitcher	St. Louis Cardinals, Pittsburgh Pirates, Brooklyn Superbas	
Chris McFarland	April 19, 1884	April 29, 1884	Outfielder	Baltimore Monumentals	
Ed McFarland	July 7, 1893	June 26, 1908	Catcher	Cleveland Spiders, St. Louis Browns (NL), Philadelphia Phillies, Chicago White Sox, Boston Red Sox	
Herm McFarland	April 21, 1896	September 29, 1903	Outfielder	Louisville Colonels, Cincinnati Reds, Chicago White Sox, Baltimore Orioles (1901–02), New York Highlanders	
Howie McFarland	July 16, 1945	August 16, 1945	Outfielder	Washington Senators	
Monte McFarland	September 14, 1895	June 8, 1896	Pitcher	Chicago Colts	
Orlando McFarlane	April 23, 1962	August 21, 1968	Catcher	Pittsburgh Pirates, Detroit Tigers, California Angels	
Jack McFetridge	June 7, 1890	September 27, 1903	Pitcher	Philadelphia Phillies	
Andy McGaffigan	September 22, 1981	July 6, 1991	Pitcher	New York Yankees, San Francisco Giants, Montreal Expos, Cincinnati Reds, Kansas City Royals	
Patsy McGaffigan	April 16, 1917	June 22, 1918	Second baseman	Philadelphia Phillies	
Eddie McGah	April 26, 1946	September 21, 1947	Catcher	Boston Red Sox	
Ambrose McGann	May 2, 1895	September 24, 1895	Utility player	Louisville Colonels	
Dan McGann	August 8, 1896	October 7, 1908	First baseman	Boston Beaneaters, Baltimore Orioles (NL), Washington Senators (NL), St. Louis Cardinals, Baltimore Orioles (1901–02), New York Giants, Boston Doves	
Chippy McGarr	July 11, 1884	September 26, 1896	Third baseman	Chicago Browns/Pittsburgh Stogies, Philadelphia Athletics (AA), St. Louis Browns (AA), Kansas City Cowboys (AA), Baltimore Orioles (AA), Boston Beaneaters, Cleveland Spiders	
Jim McGarr	May 18, 1912	May 18, 1912	Second baseman	Detroit Tigers	
Dan McGarvey	May 18, 1912	May 18, 1912	Outfielder	Detroit Tigers	
Jack McGeachey	June 17, 1886	August 24, 1891	Outfielder	Detroit Wolverines, St. Louis Maroons, Indianapolis Hoosiers (NL), Brooklyn Ward's Wonders, Philadelphia Athletics (1890–91), Boston Reds (1890–91)	
Mike McGeary	May 9, 1871	June 26, 1882	Utility infielder	Troy Haymakers, Philadelphia Athletics (1860–76), Philadelphia White Stockings, St. Louis Brown Stockings, Providence Grays, Cleveland Blues (NL), Detroit Wolverines	
Bill McGee	September 29, 1935	September 22, 1942	Pitcher	St. Louis Cardinals, New York Giants	
Dan McGee	July 14, 1934	July 20, 1934	Shortstop	Boston Braves	
Frank McGee	September 19, 1925	September 30, 1925	First baseman	Washington Senators	
Jake McGee	September 14, 2010		Pitcher	Tampa Bay Rays	
Pat McGee	September 24, 1874	September 17, 1875	Outfielder	Brooklyn Atlantics, New York Mutuals	
Willie McGee	May 10, 1982	October 3, 1999	Outfielder	St. Louis Cardinals, Oakland Athletics, San Francisco Giants, Boston Red Sox	
Connie McGeehan	July 15, 1903	August 14, 1903	Pitcher	Philadelphia Athletics	
Dan McGeehan	April 22, 1911	April 24, 1911	Second baseman	St. Louis Cardinals	
Casey McGehee	September 2, 2008		Third baseman	Chicago Cubs, Milwaukee Brewers	
Kevin McGehee	August 23, 1993	September 30, 1993	Pitcher	Baltimore Orioles	
Pat McGehee	August 23, 1912	August 23, 1912	Pitcher	Detroit Tigers	
Bill McGhee	July 5, 1944	September 16, 1945	First baseman	Philadelphia Athletics	
Ed McGhee	September 20, 1950	May 26, 1955	Outfielder	Chicago White Sox, Philadelphia Athletics	
Randy McGilberry	September 6, 1977	October 1, 1978	Pitcher	Kansas City Royals	
Bill McGill	September 16, 1907	September 27, 1907	Pitcher	St. Louis Browns	
Willie McGill	May 8, 1890	June 12, 1896	Pitcher	Cleveland Infants, Cincinnati Kelly's Killers, Cincinnati Reds, Chicago Colts, Philadelphia Phillies	
John McGillen	April 20, 1944	April 29, 1944	Pitcher	Philadelphia Athletics	
Bill McGilvray	April 17, 1908	April 27, 1908	Pitcher	Cincinnati Reds	
Jim McGinley	September 22, 1904	May 5, 1905	Pitcher	St. Louis Cardinals	
Tim McGinley	April 21, 1875	May 15, 1876	Catcher	Philadelphia Centennials, New Haven Elm Citys	
Dan McGinn	September 3, 1968	October 3, 1972	Pitcher	Cincinnati Reds, Montreal Expos, Chicago Cubs	
Frank McGinn	June 9, 1890	June 9, 1890	Outfielder	Pittsburgh Alleghenys	
Gus McGinnis	April 27, 1893	September 26, 1893	Pitcher	Chicago Colts, Philadelphia Phillies	
Jumbo McGinnis	May 2, 1882	June 10, 1887	Pitcher	St. Louis Browns (AA), Baltimore Orioles (AA), Cincinnati Red Stockings (AA)	
Russ McGinnis	June 3, 1992	May 9, 1995	Catcher	Texas Rangers, Kansas City Royals	
Joe McGinnity β	April 18, 1899	October 5, 1908	Pitcher	Baltimore Orioles (NL), Brooklyn Superbas, Baltimore Orioles (1901–02), New York Giants	
Kevin McGlinchy	April 5, 1999	September 28, 2000	Pitcher	Atlanta Braves	
John McGlone	October 7, 1886	August 15, 1888	Third baseman	Washington Nationals (1886–1889), Cleveland Blues (AA)	
Lynn McGlothen	June 25, 1972	September 19, 1982	Pitcher	Boston Red Sox, St. Louis Cardinals, San Francisco Giants, Chicago Cubs, Chicago White Sox, New York Yankees	
Pat McGlothin	April 25, 1949	April 18, 1950	Pitcher	Brooklyn Dodgers	
Jim McGlothlin	September 20, 1965	September 28, 1973	Pitcher	California Angels, Cincinnati Reds, Chicago White Sox	
Stoney McGlynn	September 20, 1906	September 2, 1908	Pitcher	St. Louis Cardinals	
Art McGovern	April 21, 1905	October 3, 1905	Catcher	Boston Americans	
Tom McGovern	June 15, 1874	June 15, 1874	Second baseman	Brooklyn Atlantics	
Beauty McGowan	April 12, 1922	May 13, 1937	Outfielder	Philadelphia Athletics, St. Louis Browns, Boston Bees	
Dustin McGowan	July 30, 2005		Pitcher	Toronto Blue Jays	
Mickey McGowan	April 22, 1948	May 1, 1948	Pitcher	New York Giants	
Howard McGraner	September 12, 1912	October 6, 1912	Pitcher	Cincinnati Reds	
Bob McGraw	September 25, 1917	September 28, 1929	Pitcher	New York Yankees, Boston Red Sox, Brooklyn Robins, St. Louis Cardinals, Philadelphia Phillies	
John McGraw (3B/Mgr) β	August 26, 1891	September 12, 1906	Third baseman	Baltimore Orioles (AA/NL), St. Louis Cardinals, Baltimore Orioles (1901–02), New York Giants	
John McGraw (P)	July 29, 1914	July 29, 1914	Pitcher	Brooklyn Tip-Tops	
Tom McGraw	May 7, 1997	May 9, 1997	Pitcher	St. Louis Cardinals	
Tug McGraw	April 18, 1965	September 25, 1984	Pitcher	New York Mets, Philadelphia Phillies	
Scott McGregor	September 19, 1976	April 27, 1988	Pitcher	Baltimore Orioles	
Slim McGrew	April 18, 1922	June 8, 1924	Pitcher	Washington Senators	
Fred McGriff	May 17, 1986	July 15, 2004	First baseman	Toronto Blue Jays, San Diego Padres, Atlanta Braves, Tampa Bay Devil Rays, Chicago Cubs, Los Angeles Dodgers	
Terry McGriff	July 11, 1987	August 7, 1994	Catcher	Cincinnati Reds, Houston Astros, Florida Marlins, St. Louis Cardinals	
Mark McGrillis	September 17, 1892	September 17, 1892	Third baseman	St. Louis Browns (NL)	
Joe McGuckin	August 27, 1890	September 8, 1890	Outfielder	Baltimore Orioles (AA)	
John McGuinness	May 6, 1876	August 7, 1884	First baseman	New York Mutuals, Syracuse Stars (NL), Philadelphia Keystones	
McGuire, (first name unknown)	June 16, 1894	June 16, 1894	Pitcher	Cincinnati Reds	
Bill McGuire	August 2, 1988	September 22, 1989	Catcher	Seattle Mariners	
Deacon McGuire	June 21, 1884	May 18, 1912	Catcher	Toledo Blue Stockings, Detroit Wolverines, Philadelphia Quakers, Cleveland Blues (AA), Rochester Broncos, Washington Statesmen/Senators (NL), Brooklyn Superbas, Detroit Tigers, New York Highlanders, Boston Americans/Red Sox, Cleveland Indians	
Jim McGuire	September 10, 1901	September 28, 1901	Shortstop	Cleveland Blues (AL)	
Mickey McGuire	September 7, 1962	October 1, 1967	Utility infielder	Baltimore Orioles	
Ryan McGuire	June 5, 1997	July 14, 2002	First baseman	Montreal Expos, New York Mets, Florida Marlins, Baltimore Orioles	
Tom McGuire	April 18, 1914	August 9, 1919	Pitcher	Chicago Chi-Feds, Chicago White Sox	
Bill McGunnigle	May 2, 1879	August 17, 1882	Outfielder	Buffalo Bisons (NL), Worcester Ruby Legs, Cleveland Blues (NL)	
Mark McGwire	August 22, 1986	October 7, 2001	First baseman	Oakland Athletics, St. Louis Cardinals	
Bob McHale	May 9, 1898	June 4, 1898	Outfielder	Washington Senators (NL)	
Jim McHale	April 14, 1908	July 7, 1908	Outfielder	Boston Red Sox	
John McHale	May 28, 1943	April 23, 1948	First baseman	Detroit Tigers	
Marty McHale	September 28, 1910	May 8, 1916	Pitcher	Boston Red Sox, New York Yankees, Cleveland Indians	
Austin McHenry	June 22, 1918	July 31, 1922	Outfielder	St. Louis Cardinals	
Vance McHenry	August 13, 1981	June 27, 1982	Shortstop	Seattle Mariners	
Vance McIlree	September 13, 1921	September 13, 1921	Pitcher	Washington Senators	
Irish McIlveen	July 4, 1906	May 6, 1909	Outfielder	Pittsburgh Pirates, New York Highlanders	
Stover McIlwain	September 25, 1957	September 28, 1958	Pitcher	Chicago White Sox	
Stuffy McInnis	April 12, 1909	August 1, 1927	First baseman	Philadelphia Athletics, Boston Red Sox, Cleveland Indians, Boston Braves, Pittsburgh Pirates, Philadelphia Phillies	
Harry McIntire	April 14, 1905	April 22, 1913	Pitcher	Brooklyn Superbas, Chicago Cubs, Cincinnati Reds	
Joe McIntosh	April 5, 1974	September 27, 1975	Pitcher	San Diego Padres	
Tim McIntosh	September 3, 1990	June 12, 1996	Utility player	Milwaukee Brewers, Montreal Expos, New York Yankees	
Frank McIntyre	May 16, 1883	June 20, 1883	Pitcher	Detroit Wolverines, Columbus Buckeyes	
Matty McIntyre	July 3, 1901	August 21, 1912	Outfielder	Philadelphia Athletics, Detroit Tigers, Chicago White Sox	
Otto McIvor	April 18, 1911	September 28, 1911	Outfielder	St. Louis Cardinals	
Doc McJames	September 24, 1895	July 13, 1901	Pitcher	Washington Senators (NL), Baltimore Orioles (NL), Brooklyn Superbas	
Archie McKain	April 25, 1937	July 5, 1943	Pitcher	Boston Red Sox, Detroit Tigers, St. Louis Browns	
Hal McKain	September 22, 1927	May 30, 1932	Pitcher	Cleveland Indians, Chicago White Sox	
Cody McKay	September 22, 2002	October 2, 2004	Catcher	Oakland Athletics, St. Louis Cardinals	
Dave McKay	August 22, 1975	October 3, 1982	Second baseman	Minnesota Twins, Toronto Blue Jays	
Reeve McKay	October 2, 1915	October 2, 1915	Pitcher	St. Louis Browns	
Ed McKean	April 16, 1887	July 27, 1899	Shortstop	Cleveland Blues (AA)/Spiders, St. Louis Perfectos	
Bill McKechnie β	September 8, 1907	September 28, 1920	Third baseman	Pittsburgh Pirates, Boston Braves, New York Yankees, Indianapolis Hoosiers (FL)/Newark Peppers, New York Giants, Cincinnati Reds	
Frank McKee	June 11, 1884	July 3, 1884	Utility player	Washington Nationals (UA)	
Jim McKee	September 15, 1972	September 29, 1973	Pitcher	Pittsburgh Pirates	
Red McKee	April 19, 1913	September 19, 1916	Catcher	Detroit Tigers	
Roger McKee	August 18, 1943	September 26, 1944	Pitcher	Philadelphia Phillies	
Walt McKeel	September 14, 1996	July 27, 2002	Catcher	Boston Red Sox, Colorado Rockies	
Jim McKeever	April 17, 1884	July 11, 1884	Catcher	Boston Reds (UA)	
Tim McKeithan	July 21, 1932	May 20, 1934	Pitcher	Philadelphia Athletics	
John McKelvey	April 19, 1875	October 28, 1875	Outfielder	New Haven Elm Citys	
Russ McKelvy	May 1, 1878	August 24, 1882	Outfielder	Indianapolis Blues, Pittsburgh Alleghenys	
Ed McKenna	July 29, 1874	July 5, 1884	Catcher	Philadelphia White Stockings, St. Louis Brown Stockings, Washington Nationals (UA)	
Kit McKenna	July 7, 1898	September 27, 1899	Pitcher	Brooklyn Bridegrooms, Baltimore Orioles (NL)	
Limb McKenry	July 24, 1915	May 5, 1916	Pitcher	Cincinnati Reds	
Michael McKenry	September 8, 2010		Catcher	Colorado Rockies, Pittsburgh Pirates	
Joel McKeon	May 6, 1986	July 10, 1987	Pitcher	Chicago White Sox	
Larry McKeon	May 1, 1884	September 15, 1886	Pitcher	Indianapolis Hoosiers (AA), Cincinnati Red Stockings (AA), Kansas City Cowboys (NL)	
Dave McKeough	April 22, 1890	June 12, 1891	Catcher	Rochester Broncos, Philadelphia Athletics (1890–91)	
Bob McKinney	July 23, 1901	August 2, 1901	Utility infielder	Philadelphia Athletics	
Rich McKinney	June 26, 1970	October 2, 1977	Utility infielder	Chicago White Sox, New York Yankees, Oakland Athletics	
Alex McKinnon	May 1, 1884	July 4, 1887	First baseman	New York Gothams, St. Louis Maroons, Pittsburgh Alleghenys	
Jeff McKnight	June 6, 1989	August 11, 1994	Utility infielder	New York Mets, Baltimore Orioles	
Jim McKnight	September 22, 1960	September 9, 1962	Third baseman	Chicago Cubs	
Tony McKnight	August 10, 2000	October 6, 2001	Pitcher	Houston Astros, Pittsburgh Pirates	
Denny McLain	September 21, 1963	September 12, 1972	Pitcher	Detroit Tigers, Washington Senators (1961–71), Oakland Athletics, Atlanta Braves	
Ed McLane	October 5, 1907	October 5, 1907	Outfielder	Brooklyn Superbas	
Art McLarney	August 23, 1932	September 25, 1932	Shortstop	New York Giants	
Polly McLarry	September 2, 1912	September 24, 1915	Utility infielder	Chicago White Sox, Chicago Cubs	
Barney McLaughlin	August 2, 1884	August 12, 1890	Utility infielder	Kansas City Cowboys (UA), Philadelphia Quakers, Syracuse Stars (AA)	
Bo McLaughlin	July 20, 1976	July 9, 1982	Pitcher	Houston Astros, Atlanta Braves, Oakland Athletics	
Byron McLaughlin	September 18, 1977	September 27, 1983	Pitcher	Seattle Mariners, California Angels	
Frank McLaughlin	August 9, 1882	August 19, 1884	Shortstop	Worcester Ruby Legs, Pittsburgh Alleghenys, Cincinnati Outlaw Reds, Chicago Browns/Pittsburgh Stogies, Kansas City Cowboys (UA)	
Jim McLaughlin (P/OF)	May 30, 1884	July 15, 1884	Utility player	Baltimore Orioles (AA)	
Jim McLaughlin (3B)	April 18, 1932	April 18, 1932	Third baseman	St. Louis Browns	
Joey McLaughlin	June 11, 1977	September 25, 1984	Pitcher	Atlanta Braves, Toronto Blue Jays, Texas Rangers	
Jud McLaughlin	June 23, 1931	May 18, 1933	Pitcher	Boston Red Sox	
Kid McLaughlin	June 30, 1914	July 12, 1914	Outfielder	Cincinnati Reds	
Pat McLaughlin	April 25, 1937	August 5, 1945	Pitcher	Detroit Tigers, Philadelphia Athletics	
Tom McLaughlin	July 17, 1883	October 3, 1891	Shortstop	Louisville Eclipse, New York Metropolitans, Washington Statesmen	
Warren McLaughlin	July 7, 1900	May 21, 1903	Pitcher	Philadelphia Phillies, Pittsburgh Pirates	
William McLaughlin	May 3, 1884	May 18, 1884	Shortstop	Washington Nationals (UA)	
Ralph McLaurin	September 5, 1908	October 4, 1908	Outfielder	St. Louis Cardinals	
Al McLean	July 16, 1935	July 30, 1935	Pitcher	Washington Senators	
Larry McLean	April 26, 1901	June 6, 1915	Catcher	Boston Americans, Chicago Cubs, St. Louis Cardinals, Cincinnati Reds, New York Giants	
Marty McLeary	August 22, 2004	May 19, 2007	Pitcher	San Diego Padres, Pittsburgh Pirates	
Wayne McLeland	April 20, 1951	May 10, 1952	Pitcher	Detroit Tigers	
Mark McLemore (2B)	September 13, 1986	October 2, 2004	Second baseman	California Angels, Cleveland Indians, Houston Astros, Baltimore Orioles, Texas Rangers, Seattle Mariners, Oakland Athletics	
Mark McLemore (P)	May 24, 2007	September 30, 2007	Pitcher	Houston Astros	
Jim McLeod	May 22, 1930	October 1, 1933	Third baseman	Washington Senators, Philadelphia Phillies	
Ralph McLeod	September 14, 1938	October 1, 1938	Outfielder	Boston Bees	
Cal McLish	May 13, 1944	July 14, 1964	Pitcher	Brooklyn Dodgers, Pittsburgh Pirates, Chicago Cubs, Cleveland Indians, Cincinnati Reds, Chicago White Sox, Philadelphia Phillies	
Nate McLouth	June 29, 2005		Outfielder	Pittsburgh Pirates, Atlanta Braves	
Sam McMackin	September 4, 1902	September 21, 1902	Pitcher	Chicago White Sox, Detroit Tigers	
Jack McMahan	April 18, 1956	September 23, 1956	Pitcher	Pittsburgh Pirates, Kansas City Athletics	
Doc McMahon	October 6, 1908	October 6, 1908	Pitcher	Boston Red Sox	
Don McMahon	June 30, 1957	June 29, 1974	Pitcher	Milwaukee Braves, Houston Colt .45s, Cleveland Indians, Boston Red Sox, Chicago White Sox, Detroit Tigers, San Francisco Giants	
Jack McMahon	August 8, 1892	June 19, 1893	First baseman	New York Giants	
Sadie McMahon	July 5, 1889	July 12, 1897	Pitcher	Philadelphia Athletics (AA), Baltimore Orioles (AA/NL), Brooklyn Bridegrooms	
John McMakin	April 19, 1902	May 31, 1902	Pitcher	Brooklyn Superbas	
Frank McManus	September 14, 1899	October 8, 1904	Catcher	Washington Senators (NL), Brooklyn Superbas, Detroit Tigers, New York Highlanders	
Jim McManus	September 21, 1960	October 2, 1960	First baseman	Kansas City Athletics	
Joe McManus	April 12, 1913	April 12, 1913	Pitcher	Cincinnati Reds	
Marty McManus	September 25, 1920	September 30, 1934	Utility infielder	St. Louis Browns, Detroit Tigers, Boston Red Sox, Boston Braves	
Pat McManus	May 22, 1879	August 13, 1879	Pitcher	Troy Trojans	
Jimmy McMath	September 7, 1968	September 22, 1968	Outfielder	Chicago Cubs	
Greg McMichael	April 12, 1993	May 27, 2000	Pitcher	Atlanta Braves, New York Mets, Los Angeles Dodgers, Oakland Athletics	
George McMillan	August 11, 1890	August 22, 1890	Outfielder	New York Giants	
Norm McMillan	April 12, 1922	October 6, 1929	Third baseman	New York Yankees, Boston Red Sox, St. Louis Browns, Chicago Cubs	
Roy McMillan	April 17, 1951	August 3, 1966	Shortstop	Cincinnati Reds, Milwaukee Braves, New York Mets	
Tom McMillan	September 17, 1977	September 21, 1977	Shortstop	Seattle Mariners	
Tommy McMillan	August 19, 1908	October 5, 1912	Shortstop	Brooklyn Superbas, Cincinnati Reds, New York Highlanders	
Billy McMillon	July 26, 1996	October 3, 2004	Outfielder	Florida Marlins, Philadelphia Phillies, Detroit Tigers, Oakland Athletics	
Hugh McMullen	September 19, 1925	April 20, 1929	Catcher	New York Giants, Washington Senators, Cincinnati Reds	
Ken McMullen	September 17, 1962	September 14, 1977	Third baseman	Los Angeles Dodgers, Washington Senators (1961–71), California Angels, Oakland Athletics, Milwaukee Brewers	
Fred McMullin	August 27, 1914	September 20, 1920	Third baseman	Detroit Tigers, Chicago White Sox	
James McMullin	July 2, 1887	July 10, 1887	Pitcher	New York Metropolitans	
John McMullin	May 9, 1871	October 25, 1875	Outfielder	Troy Haymakers, New York Mutuals, Philadelphia Athletics (1860–76), Philadelphia White Stockings	
Craig McMurtry	April 10, 1983	September 28, 1995	Pitcher	Atlanta Braves, Texas Rangers, Houston Astros	
Carl McNabb	April 20, 1945	April 20, 1945	Pinch hitter	Detroit Tigers	
Edgar McNabb	May 12, 1893	August 11, 1893	Pitcher	Baltimore Orioles (NL)	
Eric McNair	September 20, 1929	September 19, 1942	Shortstop	Philadelphia Athletics, Boston Red Sox, Chicago White Sox, Detroit Tigers	
Dave McNally	September 26, 1962	June 8, 1975	Pitcher	Baltimore Orioles, Montreal Expos	
Mike McNally	April 21, 1915	June 12, 1925	Utility infielder	Boston Red Sox, New York Yankees, Washington Senators	
Bob McNamara	May 27, 1939	September 20, 1939	Third baseman	Philadelphia Athletics	
Dinny McNamara	July 2, 1927	May 30, 1928	Outfielder	Boston Braves	
George McNamara	September 28, 1922	September 29, 1922	Outfielder	Washington Senators	
Jim McNamara	April 9, 1992	July 28, 1993	Catcher	San Francisco Giants	
Tim McNamara	June 27, 1922	May 15, 1926	Pitcher	Boston Braves, New York Giants	
Tom McNamara	June 25, 1922	June 25, 1922	Pinch hitter	Pittsburgh Pirates	
Gordon McNaughton	August 13, 1932	September 18, 1932	Pitcher	Boston Red Sox	
Harry McNeal	August 5, 1901	September 26, 1901	Pitcher	Cleveland Blues (AL)	
Rusty McNealy	September 4, 1983	October 2, 1983	Outfielder	Oakland Athletics	
Earl McNeely	August 9, 1924	September 26, 1931	Outfielder	Washington Senators, St. Louis Browns	
Jeff McNeely	September 5, 1993	October 5, 1993	Outfielder	Boston Red Sox	
Norm McNeil	June 21, 1919	September 24, 1919	Catcher	Boston Red Sox	
Jerry McNertney	April 16, 1964	June 15, 1973	Catcher	Chicago White Sox, Seattle Pilots, Milwaukee Brewers, St. Louis Cardinals, Pittsburgh Pirates	
Brian McNichol	September 7, 1999	September 30, 1999	Pitcher	Chicago Cubs	
Ed McNichol	July 9, 1904	October 3, 1904	Pitcher	Boston Beaneaters	
Bill McNulty	July 9, 1969	October 4, 1972	Outfielder	Oakland Athletics	
Pat McNulty	September 5, 1922	May 30, 1927	Outfielder	Cleveland Indians	
Frank McPartlin	August 22, 1899	August 22, 1899	Pitcher	New York Giants	
Bid McPhee β	May 2, 1882	October 15, 1899	Second baseman	Cincinnati Red Stockings (AA)/Reds	
Dallas McPherson	September 10, 2004		Third baseman	Anaheim Angels/Los Angeles Angels of Anaheim, Florida Marlins, Chicago White Sox	
John McPherson	July 12, 1901	July 10, 1904	Pitcher	Philadelphia Athletics, Philadelphia Phillies	
Herb McQuaid	June 22, 1923	September 13, 1926	Pitcher	Cincinnati Reds, New York Yankees	
Mart McQuaid	August 15, 1891	August 25, 1898	Second baseman	St. Louis Browns (AA), Washington Senators (NL)	
Jerry McQuaig	August 25, 1934	September 30, 1934	Outfielder	Philadelphia Athletics	
Mike McQueen	October 2, 1969	June 15, 1974	Pitcher	Atlanta Braves, Cincinnati Reds	
Mox McQuery	August 20, 1884	July 25, 1891	First baseman	Cincinnati Outlaw Reds, Detroit Wolverines, Kansas City Cowboys (NL), Syracuse Stars (AA), Washington Statesmen	
George McQuillan	May 8, 1907	September 1, 1918	Pitcher	Philadelphia Phillies, Cincinnati Reds, Pittsburgh Pirates, Cleveland Indians	
Hugh McQuillan	July 26, 1918	September 11, 1927	Pitcher	Boston Braves, New York Giants	
Glenn McQuillen	June 16, 1938	April 15, 1947	Outfielder	St. Louis Browns	
George McQuinn	April 14, 1936	October 2, 1948	First baseman	Cincinnati Reds, St. Louis Browns, Philadelphia Athletics, New York Yankees	
Brian McRae	August 7, 1990	October 3, 1999	Outfielder	Kansas City Royals, Chicago Cubs, New York Mets, Colorado Rockies, Toronto Blue Jays	
Hal McRae	July 11, 1968	July 17, 1987	Outfielder	Cincinnati Reds, Kansas City Royals	
Norm McRae	September 13, 1969	September 24, 1970	Pitcher	Detroit Tigers	
McRemer, first name unknown	June 20, 1884	June 20, 1884	Outfielder	Washington Nationals (UA)	
Kevin McReynolds	June 2, 1983	August 11, 1994	Outfielder	San Diego Padres, New York Mets, Kansas City Royals	
Pete McShannic	September 15, 1888	October 13, 1888	Third baseman	Pittsburgh Alleghenys	
Trick McSorley	May 6, 1875	May 6, 1886	Utility player	St. Louis Red Stockings, Toledo Blue Stockings, St. Louis Maroons, St. Louis Browns (AA)	
Paul McSweeney	September 20, 1891	September 22, 1891	Second baseman	St. Louis Browns (AA)	
Jim McTamany	August 15, 1885	October 5, 1891	Outfielder	Brooklyn Grays, Kansas City Cowboys (AA), Columbus Solons, Philadelphia Athletics (1890–91)	
Bill McTigue	May 2, 1911	May 5, 1916	Pitcher	Boston Rustlers/Braves, Detroit Tigers	
Cal McVey	May 5, 1871	September 30, 1879	Utility player	Boston Red Stockings, Baltimore Canaries, Chicago White Stockings, Cincinnati Reds (1876–1880)	
George McVey	September 19, 1885	September 29, 1885	Utility player	Brooklyn Grays	
Doug McWeeny	April 24, 1921	June 17, 1930	Pitcher	Chicago White Sox, Brooklyn Robins, Cincinnati Reds	
Bill McWilliams	July 8, 1931	July 11, 1931	Pinch hitter	Boston Red Sox	
Larry McWilliams	July 17, 1978	May 12, 1990	Pitcher	Atlanta Braves, Pittsburgh Pirates, St. Louis Cardinals, Philadelphia Phillies, Kansas City Royals	
Bobby Meacham	June 30, 1983	July 10, 1988	Shortstop	New York Yankees	
Rusty Meacham	June 29, 1991	June 20, 2001	Pitcher	Detroit Tigers, Kansas City Royals, Seattle Mariners, Houston Astros, Tampa Bay Devil Rays	
Charlie Mead	August 28, 1943	September 30, 1945	Outfielder	New York Giants	
Johnny Meador	April 14, 1920	July 15, 1920	Pitcher	Pittsburgh Pirates	
Brian Meadows	April 4, 1998	September 30, 2006	Pitcher	Florida Marlins, San Diego Padres, Kansas City Royals, Pittsburgh Pirates, Tampa Bay Devil Rays	
Lee Meadows	April 19, 1915	April 29, 1929	Pitcher	St. Louis Cardinals, Philadelphia Phillies, Pittsburgh Pirates	
Louie Meadows	July 3, 1986	October 3, 1990	Outfielder	Houston Astros, Philadelphia Phillies	
Rufus Meadows	April 23, 1926	April 23, 1926	Pitcher	Cincinnati Reds	
Dave Meads	April 13, 1987	September 30, 1988	Pitcher	Houston Astros	
George Meakim	May 2, 1890	September 3, 1895	Pitcher	Louisville Colonels, Philadelphia Athletics (1890–91), Chicago Colts, Cincinnati Reds	
Charlie Meara	June 1, 1914	June 7, 1914	Outfielder	New York Yankees	
Pat Meares	May 5, 1993	October 7, 2001	Shortstop	Minnesota Twins, Pittsburgh Pirates	
Chris Mears	June 29, 2003	September 28, 2003	Pitcher	Detroit Tigers	
Gil Meche	July 6, 1999		Pitcher	Seattle Mariners, Kansas City Royals	
Jim Mecir	September 4, 1995	September 28, 2005	Pitcher	Seattle Mariners, New York Yankees, Tampa Bay Devil Rays, Oakland Athletics, Florida Marlins	
Brandon Medders	June 20, 2005		Pitcher	Arizona Diamondbacks, San Francisco Giants	
Ray Medeiros	April 25, 1945	April 25, 1945	Pinch runner	Cincinnati Reds	
Doc Medich	September 5, 1972	October 2, 1982	Pitcher	New York Yankees, Pittsburgh Pirates, Oakland Athletics, Seattle Mariners, New York Mets, Texas Rangers, Milwaukee Brewers	
Luis Medina	September 2, 1988	June 13, 1991	First baseman	Cleveland Indians	
Rafael Medina	April 2, 1998	September 26, 1999	Pitcher	Florida Marlins	
Kris Medlen	May 21, 2009		Pitcher	Atlanta Braves	
Irv Medlinger	April 20, 1949	September 28, 1951	Pitcher	St. Louis Browns	
Scott Medvin	May 9, 1988	September 22, 1990	Pitcher	Pittsburgh Pirates, Seattle Mariners	
Joe Medwick β	September 2, 1932	July 25, 1948	Outfielder	St. Louis Cardinals, Brooklyn Dodgers, New York Giants, Boston Braves	
Tommy Mee	June 14, 1910	July 21, 1910	Shortstop	St. Louis Browns	
Pete Meegan	August 12, 1884	October 1, 1885	Pitcher	Richmond Virginians, Pittsburgh Alleghenys	
Bill Meehan	September 17, 1915	September 17, 1915	Pitcher	Philadelphia Athletics	
Dad Meek	May 10, 1889	April 24, 1890	Catcher	St. Louis Browns (AA)	
Evan Meek	April 2, 2008		Pitcher	Pittsburgh Pirates	
Roy Meeker	September 22, 1923	September 25, 1926	Pitcher	Philadelphia Athletics, Cincinnati Reds	
Jouett Meekin	June 13, 1891	July 8, 1900	Pitcher	Louisville Colonels, Washington Senators (NL), New York Giants, Boston Beaneaters, Pittsburgh Pirates	
Sammy Meeks	April 29, 1948	September 20, 1951	Shortstop	Washington Senators, Cincinnati Reds	
Phil Meeler	May 10, 1972	June 19, 1972	Pitcher	Detroit Tigers	
Russ Meers	September 28, 1941	September 26, 1947	Pitcher	Chicago Cubs	
Dave Meier	April 3, 1984	September 29, 1988	Outfielder	Minnesota Twins, Texas Rangers, Chicago Cubs	
Dutch Meier	May 12, 1906	October 7, 1906	Outfielder	Pittsburgh Pirates	
Heinie Meine	August 16, 1922	September 18, 1934	Pitcher	St. Louis Browns, Pittsburgh Pirates	
Walt Meinert	September 6, 1913	September 12, 1913	Outfielder	St. Louis Browns	
Bob Meinke	August 22, 1910	September 3, 1910	Shortstop	Cincinnati Reds	
Frank Meinke	May 1, 1884	May 22, 1885	Shortstop	Detroit Wolverines	
George Meister	August 15, 1884	October 15, 1884	Third baseman	Toledo Blue Stockings	
John Meister	August 24, 1886	June 29, 1887	Second baseman	New York Metropolitans	
Karl Meister	August 10, 1913	September 8, 1913	Outfielder	Cincinnati Reds	
Moxie Meixell	July 7, 1912	July 23, 1912	Outfielder	Cleveland Naps	
Jenrry Mejía	April 7, 2010		Pitcher	New York Mets	
Miguel Mejía	April 4, 1996	September 29, 1996	Outfielder	St. Louis Cardinals	
Roberto Mejía	July 15, 1993	April 11, 1997	Second baseman	Colorado Rockies, St. Louis Cardinals	
Román Mejías	April 13, 1955	October 4, 1964	Outfielder	Pittsburgh Pirates, Houston Colt .45s, Boston Red Sox	
Sam Mejías	September 6, 1976	October 3, 1981	Outfielder	St. Louis Cardinals, Montreal Expos, Chicago Cubs, Cincinnati Reds	
Mark Melancon	April 26, 2009		Pitcher	New York Yankees, Houston Astros	
Dutch Mele	September 14, 1937	October 3, 1937	Outfielder	Cincinnati Reds	
Sam Mele	April 15, 1947	September 16, 1956	Outfielder	Boston Red Sox, Washington Senators, Chicago White Sox, Baltimore Orioles, Cincinnati Reds, Cleveland Indians	
Francisco Meléndez	August 26, 1984	October 1, 1989	First baseman	Philadelphia Phillies, San Francisco Giants, Baltimore Orioles	
José Meléndez	September 11, 1990	August 9, 1994	Pitcher	Seattle Mariners, San Diego Padres, Boston Red Sox	
Luis Meléndez	September 7, 1970	June 1, 1977	Outfielder	St. Louis Cardinals, San Diego Padres	
Adam Melhuse	June 16, 2000	September 28, 2008	Catcher	Los Angeles Dodgers, Colorado Rockies, Oakland Athletics, Texas Rangers	
Kevin Melillo	June 24, 2007	June 24, 2007	Pinch hitter	Oakland Athletics	
Ski Melillo	April 18, 1926	September 18, 1937	Second baseman	St. Louis Browns, Boston Red Sox	
Joe Mellana	September 21, 1927	October 1, 1927	Third baseman	Philadelphia Athletics	
Bill Mellor	July 28, 1902	August 8, 1902	First baseman	Baltimore Orioles (1901–02)	
Juan Melo	September 2, 2000	October 1, 2000	Second baseman	San Francisco Giants	
Jon Meloan	September 1, 2007		Pitcher	Los Angeles Dodgers, Cleveland Indians, Oakland Athletics	
Paul Meloan	August 2, 1910	September 12, 1911	Outfielder	Chicago White Sox, St. Louis Browns	
Steve Melter	June 27, 1909	October 6, 1909	Pitcher	St. Louis Cardinals	
Bill Melton	May 4, 1968	August 30, 1977	Third baseman	Chicago White Sox, California Angels, Cleveland Indians	
Cliff Melton	April 25, 1937	September 29, 1944	Pitcher	New York Giants	
Dave Melton	April 17, 1956	June 11, 1958	Outfielder	Kansas City Athletics, California Angels	
Rube Melton	April 17, 1941	June 3, 1947	Pitcher	Philadelphia Phillies, Brooklyn Dodgers	
Mitch Meluskey	August 30, 1998	September 26, 2003	Catcher	Houston Astros, Detroit Tigers	
Bob Melvin	May 25, 1985	August 6, 1994	Catcher	Detroit Tigers, San Francisco Giants, Baltimore Orioles, Kansas City Royals, Boston Red Sox, New York Yankees, Chicago White Sox	
Kevin Mench	April 9, 2002		Outfielder	Texas Rangers, Milwaukee Brewers, Toronto Blue Jays, Washington Nationals	
Adalberto Méndez	September 6, 2010		Pitcher	Florida Marlins	
Carlos Méndez	May 22, 2003	September 28, 2003	First baseman	Baltimore Orioles	
Donaldo Méndez	April 5, 2001	July 6, 2003	Shortstop	San Diego Padres	
Carlos Mendoza	September 3, 1997	September 30, 2000	Outfielder	New York Mets, Colorado Rockies	
Luis Mendoza	September 8, 2007		Pitcher	Texas Rangers, Kansas City Royals	
Mario Mendoza	April 26, 1974	May 22, 1982	Shortstop	Pittsburgh Pirates, Seattle Mariners, Texas Rangers	
Mike Mendoza	September 7, 1979	September 26, 1979	Pitcher	Houston Astros	
Minnie Mendoza	April 9, 1970	June 7, 1970	Utility infielder	Minnesota Twins	
Ramiro Mendoza	May 25, 1996	September 1, 2005	Pitcher	New York Yankees, Boston Red Sox	
Frank Menechino	September 6, 1999	October 2, 2005	Second baseman	Oakland Athletics, Toronto Blue Jays	
Jock Menefee	August 17, 1892	September 7, 1903	Pitcher	Pittsburgh Pirates, Louisville Colonels, New York Giants, Chicago Orphans/Cubs	
Tony Menéndez	June 22, 1992	May 31, 1994	Pitcher	Cincinnati Reds, Pittsburgh Pirates, San Francisco Giants	
Paul Menhart	April 27, 1995	September 27, 1997	Pitcher	Toronto Blue Jays, Seattle Mariners, San Diego Padres	
Denis Menke	April 14, 1962	July 10, 1974	Shortstop	Milwaukee/Atlanta Braves, Houston Astros, Cincinnati Reds	
Mike Menosky	April 18, 1914	October 7, 1923	Outfielder	Pittsburgh Burghers, Washington Senators, Boston Red Sox	
Ed Mensor	July 15, 1912	September 7, 1914	Outfielder	Pittsburgh Pirates	
Ted Menze	April 23, 1918	April 23, 1918	Outfielder	St. Louis Cardinals	
Mike Meola	April 24, 1933	September 16, 1936	Pitcher	Boston Red Sox, St. Louis Browns	
Rudy Meoli	September 9, 1971	June 8, 1979	Shortstop	California Angels, Chicago Cubs, Philadelphia Phillies	
Héctor Mercado	April 4, 2000	July 11, 2003	Pitcher	Cincinnati Reds, Philadelphia Phillies	
Orlando Mercado	September 13, 1982	September 30, 1990	Catcher	Seattle Mariners, Texas Rangers, Detroit Tigers, Los Angeles Dodgers, Oakland Athletics, Minnesota Twins, New York Mets, Montreal Expos	
Orlando Merced	June 27, 1990	September 28, 2003	Outfielder	Pittsburgh Pirates, Toronto Blue Jays, Minnesota Twins, Boston Red Sox, Chicago Cubs, Montreal Expos, Houston Astros	
Henry Mercedes	April 22, 1992	September 21, 1997	Catcher	Oakland Athletics, Kansas City Royals, Texas Rangers	
José Mercedes	May 31, 1994	September 24, 2003	Pitcher	Milwaukee Brewers, Baltimore Orioles, Montreal Expos	
Luis Mercedes	September 8, 1991	September 23, 1993	Outfielder	Baltimore Orioles, San Francisco Giants	
Jack Mercer	August 2, 1910	August 2, 1910	Pitcher	Pittsburgh Pirates	
John Mercer	June 25, 1912	June 25, 1912	First baseman	St. Louis Cardinals	
Mark Mercer	September 1, 1981	September 28, 1981	Pitcher	Texas Rangers	
Win Mercer	April 21, 1894	September 27, 1902	Pitcher	Washington Senators (NL), New York Giants, Washington Senators, Detroit Tigers	
Andy Merchant	September 28, 1975	June 10, 1976	Catcher	Boston Red Sox	
Kent Mercker	September 22, 1989	May 30, 2008	Pitcher	Atlanta Braves, Baltimore Orioles, Cleveland Indians, Cincinnati Reds, St. Louis Cardinals, Boston Red Sox, Anaheim Angels, Colorado Rockies, Chicago Cubs	
Cla Meredith	May 8, 2005		Pitcher	Boston Red Sox, San Diego Padres, Baltimore Orioles	
Spike Merena	September 16, 1934	September 30, 1934	Pitcher	Boston Red Sox	
Art Merewether	July 10, 1922	July 10, 1922	Pitcher	Pittsburgh Pirates	
Ron Meridith	September 16, 1984	June 5, 1987	Pitcher	Chicago Cubs, Texas Rangers	
Fred Merkle	September 21, 1907	September 26, 1926	First baseman	New York Giants, Brooklyn Robins, Chicago Cubs, New York Yankees	
Lou Merloni	June 5, 1993	June 4, 2006	Utility infielder	Boston Red Sox, San Diego Padres, Cleveland Indians, Los Angeles Angels of Anaheim	
Ed Merrill	May 5, 1882	July 31, 1884	Second baseman	Louisville Eclipse, Worcester Ruby Legs, Indianapolis Hoosiers (AA)	
Brett Merriman	April 8, 1993	June 22, 1994	Pitcher	Minnesota Twins	
Lloyd Merriman	April 24, 1949	September 17, 1955	Outfielder	Cincinnati Reds/Redlegs, Chicago White Sox, Chicago Cubs	
Bill Merritt	August 8, 1891	October 15, 1899	Catcher	Chicago Colts, Louisville Colonels, Boston Beaneaters, Pittsburgh Pirates, Cincinnati Reds	
George Merritt	September 6, 1901	May 26, 1903	Outfielder	Pittsburgh Pirates	
Herm Merritt	August 24, 1921	October 2, 1921	Shortstop	Detroit Tigers	
Jim Merritt	August 2, 1965	May 23, 1975	Pitcher	Minnesota Twins, Cincinnati Reds, Texas Rangers	
John Merritt	September 27, 1913	September 27, 1913	Outfielder	New York Giants	
Lloyd Merritt	April 22, 1957	September 28, 1957	Pitcher	St. Louis Cardinals	
Jack Merson	September 14, 1951	April 24, 1953	Second baseman	Pittsburgh Pirates, Boston Red Sox	
Sam Mertes	June 30, 1896	September 15, 1906	Outfielder	Philadelphia Phillies, Chicago Orphans, Chicago White Sox, New York Giants, St. Louis Cardinals	
Jim Mertz	May 1, 1943	October 2, 1943	Pitcher	Washington Senators	
Lennie Merullo	September 12, 1941	August 22, 1947	Shortstop	Chicago Cubs	
Matt Merullo	April 12, 1989	September 29, 1995	Catcher	Chicago White Sox, Cleveland Indians, Minnesota Twins	
José Mesa	September 10, 1987	September 29, 2007	Pitcher	Baltimore Orioles, Cleveland Indians, San Francisco Giants, Seattle Mariners, Philadelphia Phillies, Pittsburgh Pirates, Colorado Rockies, Detroit Tigers	
Steve Mesner	September 23, 1938	September 30, 1945	Third baseman	Chicago Cubs, St. Louis Cardinals, Cincinnati Reds	
Devin Mesoraco	September 3, 2011		Catcher	Cincinnati Reds	
Bobby Messenger	August 30, 1909	May 5, 1914	Outfielder	Chicago White Sox, St. Louis Browns	
Bud Messenger	July 31, 1924	August 28, 1924	Pitcher	Cleveland Indians	
Randy Messenger	June 22, 2005		Pitcher	Florida Marlins, San Francisco Giants, Seattle Mariners	
Andy Messersmith	July 4, 1968	June 1, 1979	Pitcher	California Angels, Los Angeles Dodgers, Atlanta Braves, New York Yankees	
Tom Messitt	September 14, 1899	September 20, 1899	Catcher	Louisville Colonels	
Tom Metcalf	August 4, 1963	September 20, 1963	Pitcher	New York Yankees	
Travis Metcalf	May 19, 2007		Third baseman	Texas Rangers	
Alfred Metcalfe	May 27, 1875	June 17, 1875	Third baseman	New York Mutuals	
Mike Metcalfe	September 18, 1998	July 9, 2000	Outfielder	Los Angeles Dodgers	
Scat Metha	April 22, 1940	August 10, 1940	Second baseman	Detroit Tigers	
Bud Metheny	April 27, 1943	May 9, 1946	Outfielder	New York Yankees	
Dewey Metivier	September 15, 1922	September 11, 1924	Pitcher	Cleveland Indians	
Catfish Metkovich	July 16, 1943	September 26, 1954	Outfielder	Boston Red Sox, Cleveland Indians, Chicago White Sox, Pittsburgh Pirates, Chicago Cubs, Milwaukee Braves	
Charlie Metro	May 4, 1943	August 5, 1945	Outfielder	Detroit Tigers, Philadelphia Athletics	
Lenny Metz	September 11, 1923	September 27, 1925	Shortstop	Philadelphia Phillies	
Butch Metzger	September 8, 1974	June 28, 1978	Pitcher	San Diego Padres, St. Louis Cardinals, New York Mets	
Roger Metzger	June 16, 1970	August 10, 1980	Shortstop	Chicago Cubs, Houston Astros, San Francisco Giants	
William Metzig	September 19, 1944	October 1, 1944	Second baseman	Chicago White Sox	
Alex Metzler	September 16, 1925	September 28, 1930	Outfielder	Chicago Cubs, Philadelphia Athletics, Chicago White Sox, St. Louis Browns	
Hensley Meulens	August 23, 1989	May 14, 1998	Outfielder	New York Yankees, Montreal Expos, Arizona Diamondbacks	
Bob Meusel	April 14, 1920	September 26, 1930	Outfielder	New York Yankees, Cincinnati Reds	
Irish Meusel	October 1, 1914	July 22, 1927	Outfielder	Washington Senators, Philadelphia Phillies, New York Giants, Brooklyn Robins	
Benny Meyer	April 9, 1913	September 22, 1925	Outfielder	Brooklyn Superbas, Baltimore Terrapins, Buffalo Blues, Philadelphia Phillies	
Billy Meyer	September 6, 1913	September 18, 1917	Catcher	Chicago White Sox, Philadelphia Athletics	
Bob Meyer	April 20, 1964	May 20, 1970	Pitcher	New York Yankees, Los Angeles Angels, Kansas City Athletics, Seattle Pilots, Milwaukee Brewers	
Brian Meyer	September 3, 1988	October 2, 1990	Pitcher	Houston Astros	
Dan Meyer (1B)	September 14, 1974	May 24, 1985	First baseman	Detroit Tigers, Seattle Mariners, Oakland Athletics	
Dan Meyer (P)	September 14, 2004		Pitcher	Atlanta Braves, Oakland Athletics, Florida Marlins	
Drew Meyer	April 21, 2006	May 9, 2006	Second baseman	Texas Rangers	
Dutch Meyer	June 23, 1937	September 22, 1946	Second baseman	Chicago Cubs, Detroit Tigers, Cleveland Indians	
George Meyer	September 3, 1938	October 2, 1938	Second baseman	Chicago White Sox	
Jack Meyer	April 16, 1955	April 30, 1961	Pitcher	Philadelphia Phillies	
Joey Meyer	April 4, 1988	September 30, 1989	First baseman	Milwaukee Brewers	
Leo Meyer	September 27, 1909	October 4, 1909	Shortstop	Brooklyn Superbas	
Russ Meyer	September 13, 1946	June 28, 1959	Pitcher	Chicago Cubs, Philadelphia Phillies, Brooklyn Dodgers, Cincinnati Reds, Boston Red Sox, Kansas City Athletics	
Scott Meyer	September 10, 1978	October 1, 1978	Catcher	Oakland Athletics	
Levi Meyerle	May 20, 1871	April 26, 1884	Third baseman	Philadelphia Athletics (1860–76), Philadelphia White Stockings, Chicago White Stockings, Cincinnati Reds (1876–1880), Philadelphia Keystones	
Chad Meyers	August 6, 1999	September 28, 2003	Second baseman	Chicago Cubs, Seattle Mariners	
Chief Meyers	April 16, 1909	October 4, 1917	Catcher	New York Giants, Brooklyn Robins, Boston Braves	
George Meyers	August 30, 1890	October 4, 1890	Third baseman	Philadelphia Athletics (1890–91)	
Lou Meyers	April 17, 1884	May 10, 1884	Catcher	Cincinnati Outlaw Reds	
