= List of Major League Baseball players (Y) =

The following is a list of Major League Baseball players, retired or active. As of the end of the 2025 season, there have been 134 players with a last name that begins with Y who have been on a major league roster at some point.

== Y ==
Name	Debut	Final game	Position	Teams	Ref
Keiichi Yabu	April 9, 2005	September 27, 2008	Pitcher	Oakland Athletics, San Francisco Giants	
Yasuhiko Yabuta	April 5, 2008	October 4, 2009	Pitcher	Kansas City Royals	
Jimmy Yacabonis	June 11, 2017	August 11, 2023	Pitcher	Baltimore Orioles, Seattle Mariners, Miami Marlins, Tampa Bay Rays, New York Mets	
Henry Yaik	October 3, 1888	October 4, 1888	Utility player	Pittsburgh Alleghenys	
Miguel Yajure	August 31, 2020	September 25, 2022	Pitcher	New York Yankees, Pittsburgh Pirates	
Ad Yale	September 18, 1905	September 20, 1905	First baseman	Brooklyn Superbas	
Shun Yamaguchi	July 26, 2020	September 28, 2020	Pitcher	Toronto Blue Jays	
Jordan Yamamoto	June 12, 2019	May 23, 2021	Pitcher	Miami Marlins, New York Mets	
Yoshinobu Yamamoto	March 21, 2024		Pitcher	Los Angeles Dodgers	
Esteban Yan	May 20, 1996	July 6, 2006	Pitcher	Baltimore Orioles, Tampa Bay Devil Rays, Texas Rangers, St. Louis Cardinals, Detroit Tigers, Los Angeles Angels of Anaheim, Cincinnati Reds	
Hugh Yancy	July 5, 1972	May 29, 1976	Utility infielder	Chicago White Sox	
Eric Yang	July 31, 2024		Catcher	Cincinnati Reds	
Yang Hyeon-jong	April 26, 2021	September 13, 2021	Pitcher	Texas Rangers	
George Yankowski	August 17, 1942	June 28, 1949	Catcher	Philadelphia Athletics, Chicago White Sox	
George Yantz	September 30, 1912	September 30, 1912	Catcher	Chicago Cubs	
Ryan Yarbrough	March 31, 2018		Pitcher	Tampa Bay Rays, Kansas City Royals, Los Angeles Dodgers, Toronto Blue Jays, New York Yankees	
Eric Yardley	August 21, 2019	June 17, 2021	Pitcher	San Diego Padres, Milwaukee Brewers	
Ed Yarnall	July 15, 1999	July 6, 2000	Pitcher	New York Yankees	
Rusty Yarnall	June 30, 1926	June 30, 1926	Pitcher	Philadelphia Phillies	
Rube Yarrison	April 13, 1922	May 7, 1924	Pitcher	Philadelphia Athletics, Brooklyn Robins	
Yam Yaryan	April 23, 1921	September 24, 1922	Catcher	Chicago White Sox	
Carl Yastrzemski β	April 11, 1961	October 2, 1983	Outfielder	Boston Red Sox	
Mike Yastrzemski	May 25, 2019		Outfielder	San Francisco Giants, Kansas City Royals	
Al Yates	May 13, 1971	July 27, 1971	Outfielder	Milwaukee Brewers	
Kirby Yates	June 7, 2014		Pitcher	Tampa Bay Rays, New York Yankees, Los Angeles Angels, San Diego Padres, Atlanta Braves, Texas Rangers, Los Angeles Dodgers	
Tyler Yates	April 9, 2004	May 15, 2009	Pitcher	New York Mets, Atlanta Braves, Pittsburgh Pirates	
Emil Yde	April 21, 1924	October 3, 1929	Pitcher	Pittsburgh Pirates, Detroit Tigers	
Bert Yeabsley	May 28, 1919	June 10, 1919	Pinch hitter	Philadelphia Phillies	
George Yeager	September 25, 1896	August 5, 1902	Catcher	Boston Beaneaters, Cleveland Blues, Pittsburgh Pirates, New York Giants, Baltimore Orioles (1901–02)	
Joe Yeager	April 22, 1898	September 29, 1908	Utility player	Brooklyn Bridegrooms/Superbas, Detroit Tigers, New York Highlanders, St. Louis Browns	
Steve Yeager	August 2, 1972	August 29, 1986	Catcher	Los Angeles Dodgers, Seattle Mariners	
Al Yeargin	October 1, 1922	September 20, 1924	Pitcher	Boston Braves	
Bill Yeatman	April 20, 1872	April 20, 1872	Outfielder	Washington Nationals (NA)	
Eric Yelding	April 9, 1989	October 3, 1993	Utility player	Houston Astros, Chicago Cubs	
Christian Yelich	July 23, 2013		Outfielder	Miami Marlins, Milwaukee Brewers	
Archie Yelle	May 12, 1917	July 10, 1919	Catcher	Detroit Tigers	
Larry Yellen	September 26, 1963	October 3, 1964	Pitcher	Houston Colt .45's	
Moses Yellowhorse	April 15, 1921	October 1, 1922	Pitcher	Pittsburgh Pirates	
Juan Yepez	May 4, 2022		Outfielder	St. Louis Cardinals, Washington Nationals	
Carroll Yerkes	May 31, 1927	April 25, 1933	Pitcher	Philadelphia Athletics, Chicago Cubs	
Stan Yerkes	May 3, 1901	April 17, 1903	Pitcher	Baltimore Orioles (1901–1902), St. Louis Cardinals	
Steve Yerkes	September 29, 1909	October 1, 1916	Second baseman	Boston Red Sox, Pittsburgh Rebels, Chicago Cubs	
Bill Yerrick	September 27, 1895	September 1, 1896	Pitcher	Boston Beaneaters	
Trey Yesavage	September 15, 2025		Pitcher	Toronto Blue Jays	
Rich Yett	April 13, 1985	April 25, 1990	Pitcher	Minnesota Twins, Cleveland Indians	
Tom Yewcic	June 27, 1957	June 27, 1957	Catcher	Detroit Tigers	
Ed Yewell	May 12, 1884	August 7, 1884	Utility player	Washington Nationals (AA), Washington Nationals (UA)	
Charlie Yingling	June 22, 1894	June 22, 1894	Shortstop	Philadelphia Phillies	
Earl Yingling	April 12, 1911	May 23, 1918	Pitcher	Cleveland Naps, Brooklyn Dodgers/Superbas, Cincinnati Reds, Washington Senators	
Joe Yingling	May 28, 1886	May 28, 1886	Pitcher	Washington Nationals (1886–1889)	
Gabriel Ynoa	August 13, 2016	September 25, 2019	Pitcher	New York Mets, Baltimore Orioles	
Huascar Ynoa	June 16, 2019		Pitcher	Atlanta Braves	
Michael Ynoa	June 14, 2016	July 1, 2017	Pitcher	Chicago White Sox	
Rafael Ynoa	September 1, 2014	August 4, 2016	Third baseman	Colorado Rockies	
Lenny Yochim	September 18, 1951	June 19, 1954	Pitcher	Pittsburgh Pirates	
Ray Yochim	May 2, 1948	May 22, 1949	Pitcher	St. Louis Cardinals	
Bill Yohe	August 30, 1909	September 27, 1909	Third baseman	Washington Senators	
Craig Yoho	April 21, 2025		Pitcher	Milwaukee Brewers	
Jim York	September 21, 1970	August 5, 1976	Pitcher	Kansas City Royals, Houston Astros, New York Yankees	
Lefty York	September 12, 1919	October 2, 1921	Pitcher	Philadelphia Athletics, Chicago Cubs	
Mike York	August 17, 1990	August 16, 1991	Pitcher	Pittsburgh Pirates, Cleveland Indians	
Rudy York	August 22, 1934	September 20, 1948	First baseman	Detroit Tigers, Boston Red Sox, Chicago White Sox, Philadelphia Athletics	
Tom York	May 9, 1871	October 1, 1885	Outfielder	Troy Haymakers, Baltimore Canaries, Philadelphia White Stockings, Hartford Dark Blues, Providence Grays, Cleveland Blues (NL), Baltimore Orioles (19th century)	
Tony York	April 18, 1944	June 25, 1944	Utility infielder	Chicago Cubs	
Nick Yorke	September 16, 2024		Pitcher	Pittsburgh Pirates	
Masataka Yoshida	March 30, 2023		Outfielder	Boston Red Sox	
Masato Yoshii	April 5, 1998	September 11, 2002	Pitcher	New York Mets, Colorado Rockies, Montreal Expos	
Eddie Yost	August 16, 1944	July 28, 1962	Third baseman	Los Angeles Angels	
Gus Yost	June 12, 1893	June 12, 1893	Pitcher	Chicago Colts	
Ned Yost	April 12, 1980	October 6, 1985	Catcher	Milwaukee Brewers, Texas Rangers, Montreal Expos	
Elmer Yoter	September 9, 1921	April 18, 1928	Third baseman	Philadelphia Athletics, Cleveland Indians, Chicago Cubs	
Kevin Youkilis	May 15, 2004	June 13, 2013	First baseman	Boston Red Sox	
Shane Youman	September 10, 2006	September 30, 2007	Pitcher	Pittsburgh Pirates	
Floyd Youmans	July 1, 1985	June 24, 1989	Pitcher	Montreal Expos, Philadelphia Phillies	
Alex Young	June 27, 2019		Pitcher	Arizona Diamondbacks, Cleveland Indians, San Francisco Giants, Cincinnati Reds, New York Mets	
Andrew Young	August 1, 2020	September 15, 2021	Infielder	Arizona Diamondbacks	
Anthony Young	August 5, 1991	June 19, 1996	Pitcher	New York Mets, Chicago Cubs, Houston Astros	
Babe Young	September 26, 1936	October 2, 1948	First baseman	New York Giants, Cincinnati Reds, St. Louis Cardinals	
Bobby Young	August 30, 1948	September 28, 1958	Second baseman	St. Louis Cardinals, St. Louis Browns, Baltimore Orioles, Cleveland Indians, Philadelphia Phillies	
Brandon Young	April 19, 2025		Pitcher	Baltimore Orioles	
Charlie Young	September 5, 1915	October 3, 1915	Pitcher	Baltimore Terrapins	
Chris Young (OF)	August 18, 2006	July 3, 2018	Outfielder	Arizona Diamondbacks, Oakland Athletics, New York Mets, New York Yankees, Boston Red Sox, Los Angeles Angels	
Chris Young (P)	August 24, 2004	June 17, 2017	Pitcher	Texas Rangers, San Diego Padres, New York Mets, Seattle Mariners, Kansas City Royals	
Cliff Young	July 14, 1990	July 24, 1993	Pitcher	California Angels, Cleveland Indians	
Cole Young	May 31, 2025		Second baseman	Seattle Mariners	
Curt Young	June 24, 1983	July 5, 1993	Pitcher	Oakland Athletics, Kansas City Royals, New York Yankees	
Cy Young β	August 6, 1890	October 6, 1911	Pitcher	Cleveland Spiders, St. Louis Cardinals, Boston Americans, Cleveland Naps, Boston Rustlers	
Danny Young	March 30, 2000	April 6, 2000	Pitcher	Chicago Cubs	
Danny Young	May 9, 2022		Pitcher	Seattle Mariners, Atlanta Braves, New York Mets	
Del Young (OF)	September 24, 1909	May 12, 1915	Outfielder	Cincinnati Reds, Buffalo Buffeds/Blues	
Del Young (IF)	April 19, 1937	June 12, 1940	Utility infielder	Philadelphia Phillies	
Delmon Young	August 29, 2006	June 29, 2015	Outfielder	Tampa Bay Devil Rays, Minnesota Twins, Detroit Tigers, Philadelphia Phillies, Baltimore Orioles	
Delwyn Young	September 7, 2006	October 2, 2010	Outfielder	Los Angeles Dodgers, Pittsburgh Pirates	
Dick Young	September 11, 1951	September 28, 1952	Second baseman	Philadelphia Phillies	
Dmitri Young	August 29, 1996	July 11, 2008	Utility player	St. Louis Cardinals, Cincinnati Reds, Detroit Tigers, Washington Nationals	
Donald Young	September 9, 1965	October 1, 1969	Outfielder	Chicago Cubs	
Eric Young Sr.	July 30, 1992	September 19, 2006	Second baseman	Los Angeles Dodgers, Colorado Rockies, Chicago Cubs, Milwaukee Brewers, San Francisco Giants, Texas Rangers, San Diego Padres	
Eric Young Jr.	August 25, 2009	September 30, 2018	Utility player	Colorado Rockies, New York Mets, Atlanta Braves, New York Yankees, Los Angeles Angels	
Ernie Young	May 17, 1994	September 24, 2004	Outfielder	Oakland Athletics, Kansas City Royals, Arizona Diamondbacks, Detroit Tigers, Cleveland Indians	
George Young	August 10, 1913	August 15, 1913	Pinch hitter	Cleveland Naps	
Gerald Young	July 8, 1987	August 11, 1994	Outfielder	Houston Astros, Colorado Rockies, St. Louis Cardinals	
Harley Young	April 21, 1908	July 4, 1908	Pitcher	Pittsburgh Pirates, Boston Doves	
Herman Young	June 11, 1911	June 23, 1911	Utility infielder	Boston Rustlers	
Irv Young	April 14, 1905	August 25, 1911	Pitcher	Boston Beaneaters/Doves, Pittsburgh Pirates, Chicago White Sox	
J. B. Young	June 10, 1892	June 10, 1892	Pitcher	St. Louis Browns (1882–1900)	
Jacob Young	August 26, 2023		Center fielder	Washington Nationals	
Jared Young	September 16, 2022		Utility player	Chicago Cubs, New York Mets	
Jason Young	May 12, 2003	May 21, 2004	Pitcher	Colorado Rockies	
John Young	September 9, 1971	September 25, 1971	First baseman	Detroit Tigers	
Kevin Young	July 12, 1992	June 27, 2003	First baseman	Pittsburgh Pirates, Kansas City Royals	
Kip Young	July 21, 1978	September 26, 1979	Pitcher	Detroit Tigers	
Matt Young (P)	April 6, 1983	August 6, 1993	Pitcher	Seattle Mariners, Los Angeles Dodgers, Oakland Athletics, Boston Red Sox, Cleveland Indians	
Matt Young (OF)	April 3, 2011	June 13, 2012	Outfielder	Atlanta Braves, Detroit Tigers	
Michael Young	September 29, 2000	September 29, 2013	Shortstop	Texas Rangers, Philadelphia Phillies, Los Angeles Dodgers	
Mike Young	September 14, 1982	September 30, 1989	Outfielder	Baltimore Orioles, Philadelphia Phillies, Milwaukee Brewers, Cleveland Indians	
Pep Young	April 25, 1933	September 30, 1945	Second baseman	Pittsburgh Pirates, Cincinnati Reds, St. Louis Cardinals	
Pete Young	June 5, 1992	July 18, 1993	Pitcher	Montreal Expos	
Ralph Young	April 10, 1913	September 29, 1922	Second baseman	New York Yankees, Detroit Tigers, Philadelphia Athletics	
Russ Young	April 16, 1931	July 27, 1931	Catcher	St. Louis Browns	
Tim Young	September 5, 1998	July 6, 2000	Pitcher	Montreal Expos, Boston Red Sox	
Walter Young	September 6, 2005	October 2, 2005	First baseman	Baltimore Orioles	
Chief Youngblood	July 16, 1922	July 31, 1922	Pitcher	Washington Senators	
Joel Youngblood	April 13, 1976	September 27, 1989	Outfielder	Cincinnati Reds, St. Louis Cardinals, New York Mets, Montreal Expos, San Francisco Giants	
Madison Younginer	August 7, 2016	August 24, 2016	Pitcher	Atlanta Braves	
Henry Youngman	April 19, 1890	May 23, 1890	Utility infielder	Pittsburgh Alleghenys	
Ross Youngs β	September 25, 1917	August 10, 1926	Outfielder	New York Giants	
Ducky Yount	May 20, 1914	August 15, 1914	Pitcher	Baltimore Terrapins	
Eddie Yount	September 9, 1937	September 10, 1939	Outfielder	Philadelphia Athletics, Pittsburgh Pirates	
Larry Yount	September 15, 1971	September 15, 1971	Pitcher	Houston Astros	
Robin Yount β	April 5, 1974	October 3, 1993	Shortstop / Outfielder	Milwaukee Brewers	
Carl Yowell	September 5, 1924	October 1, 1925	Pitcher	Cleveland Indians	
Eddie Yuhas	April 17, 1952	April 28, 1953	Pitcher	St. Louis Cardinals	
Jeff Yurak	September 15, 1978	October 1, 1978	Outfielder	Milwaukee Brewers	
Sal Yvars	September 27, 1947	September 26, 1954	Catcher	New York Giants, St. Louis Cardinals	
