= John Mulligan (disambiguation) =

John Mulligan may refer to:

- John Mulligan (musician), English new wave musician
- John Mulligan (baseball), Major League Baseball third baseman
- John W. Mulligan (1774-1862), attorney, Friedrich Wilhelm von Steuben's secretary and U.S. Consul in Athens.
