= Peter Morris (baseball) =

Welsh baseball player (1854–1884)

- Shortstop
- Born: January 1, 1854; Rhuddlan, Wales
- Died: December 9, 1884 (aged 30); Columbus, Wisconsin, US
- Batted: Unknown Threw: Unknown

MLB debut
- May 14, 1884, for the Washington Nationals

Last MLB appearance
- May 14, 1884, for the Washington Nationals

MLB statistics
- Batting average: .000
- At bats: 3
- Hits: 0
- Stats at Baseball Reference

Teams
- Washington Nationals (UA) (1884)

Peter R. Morris (January 1, 1854 – December 9, 1884) was a 19th-century Welsh baseball player. He played in a single game for the Union Association's Washington Nationals on May 14, 1884. Until 2007, little was known about Morris before a writer of the same name discovered biographical information about him.

== Career ==
Morris played in one major league game in his career. This came on May 14, 1884, as the shortstop for the Washington Nationals of the Union Association. In the game, he recorded no hits in three at-bats and had three assists and an error in the field.

== Early knowledge ==
All that was originally known about Morris came from an initial listing in The Baseball Encyclopedia, first published in 1969, for a player known as "P. Morris". This player was said to have been born in Rockford, Illinois. This entry, with the Rockford birthplace and the lack of a first name, persisted in the Total Baseball books of later vintage.

== Discovery ==
In 2007, a writer for the Society for American Baseball Research (SABR), coincidentally also named Peter Morris, discovered newly researched information on the ballplayer. The writer Morris found that the ballplayer Morris was also named Peter, learned his middle initial, and that he was born in Rhuddlan in Wales on January 1, 1854. This made Morris the first major leaguer from Wales, predating Ted Lewis by 12 years.

The ballplayer was listed as having been a reserve player for the independent Milwaukee Maple Leafs baseball club in 1883 and 1884. In learning about the ballplayer, the writer Morris found a mention of the Maple Leafs playing a series hosted by a team from Chicago on May 13. The ballplayer Morris started every game of that series save for one. The only game he did not start was on May 14, the date the previously known "P. Morris" appeared in a game for the Nationals, an away game against the Chicago Browns, another Union Association team. As the Nationals were known to have a link to the Milwaukee club, (Note: Nearly a week after Morris appeared on the team, teammate John Deasley was signed to play shortstop for the Nationals. Pat Dealy, a catcher, was also purchased by Washington during the season but did not appear in any games with the club.) it was surmised by the writer Morris and SABR editor Bill Carle that the player who appeared for Washington on the 14th was indeed the ballplayer Peter Morris. In the same discovery, the writer found that the ballplayer died nearly seven months later, on December 9, in a railway coupling accident, and was buried in Ixonia, Wisconsin.

== Later research ==
In his 2013 book, Cracking Baseball's Cold Cases, the writer Morris included further information on his search for the ballplayer. He found that the ballplayer had likely played for the Aetna Club of Detroit in the 1870s, and later played briefly for the Stillwater, Minnesota club of the Northwestern League three months after his time representing Washington before rejoining the Maple Leafs. The research on the ballplayer Morris led to the writer also obtaining a copy of the ballplayer's birth certificate from Wales.

== Sources ==
- Career statistics from Baseball Reference · Baseball Reference (Minors) · Retrosheet · Baseball Almanac
