= Al Bradley =

American baseball player (1856–1937)

- Outfielder
- Born: May 23, 1856; Brady's Bend, Pennsylvania, U.S.
- Died: February 5, 1937 (aged 80); Altoona, Pennsylvania, U.S.
- Batted: Unknown Threw: Unknown

MLB debut
- May 21, 1884, for the Washington Nationals

Last MLB appearance
- May 21, 1884, for the Washington Nationals

MLB statistics
- Batting average: .000
- Hits: 0
- RBIs: 0
- Stats at Baseball Reference

Teams
- Washington Nationals (1884)

Albert Joseph Bradley (May 23, 1856 – February 5, 1937) was an American Major League Baseball outfielder who played in one game on May 21, 1884, for the Washington Nationals of the Union Association.
