= Icicle Reeder =

American baseball player (1858–1913)

James Edward "Icicle" Reeder
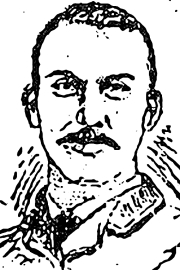
- Outfielder
- Born: 1858; Cincinnati, Ohio, US
- Died: January 15, 1913; Cincinnati, Ohio, US
- Batted: Right Threw: Unknown

MLB debut
- June 24, 1884, for the Cincinnati Red Stockings

Last MLB appearance
- August 5, 1884, for the Washington Nationals (UA)

MLB statistics
- Batting average: .154
- Home runs: 0
- hits: 4
- Stats at Baseball Reference

Teams
- Cincinnati Red Stockings (1884); Washington Nationals (UA) (1884)

Edward J. "Icicle" Reeder (1858 – January 15, 1913) was an American Major League Baseball player. He played six games in the major leagues in 1884, three for the Cincinnati Red Stockings of the American Association and three for the Washington Nationals of the Union Association. He played in the outfield for all six.

Reeder died in 1913 in his home town of Cincinnati, Ohio, of general paralysis of the insane.

On November 1, 2025, he was honored with a granite headstone on his grave that had been unmarked since his death in 1913. This project was made possible by the group, "Gone But Not Forgotten: MLB Unmarked Graves Project".
