= Michael Scanlon (baseball) =

Irish-American baseball manager (1843–1929)

- Manager
- Born: November 1843; Cork, Ireland
- Died: January 18, 1929 (aged 85); Washington, D.C., U.S.

Teams
- Washington Nationals (UA) (1884); Washington Nationals (NL) (1886)

Michael B. Scanlon (November 1843 – January 18, 1929) was an Irish-American professional baseball manager.

Scanlon served as manager for two major league teams; the 1884 Washington Nationals of the Union Association and the 1886 Washington Nationals of the National League. In 196 games as a manager, he won 60 games and lost 132 games for a .313 winning percentage. (Note: Total games managed includes four ties.) Born in Cork, Ireland, (Note: At the time of Scanlon's birth, present-day Ireland was part of the United Kingdom of Great Britain and Ireland.) Scanlon died in 1929 in Washington, D.C.
