= Joe Gunson =

American baseball player (1863–1942)

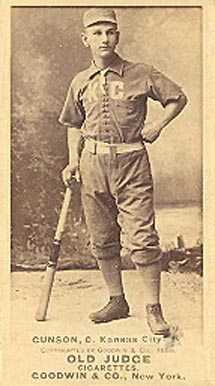
- Catcher
- Born: March 23, 1863; Philadelphia, Pennsylvania, U.S.
- Died: November 15, 1942 (aged 79); Philadelphia, Pennsylvania, U.S.
- Batted: Right Threw: Right

MLB debut
- June 14, 1884, for the Washington Nationals

Last MLB appearance
- September 18, 1893, for the Cleveland Spiders

MLB statistics
- Batting average: .211
- Home runs: 0
- Runs scored: 96
- Stats at Baseball Reference

Teams
- Washington Nationals (1884); Kansas City Cowboys (1889); Baltimore Orioles (1892); St. Louis Browns (1893); Cleveland Spiders (1893)

Joseph Brook Gunson (March 23, 1863 – November 15, 1942) was an American Major League Baseball catcher between 1884 and 1893.

== Biography ==
Born in Philadelphia, Gunson played for the Cleveland Spiders, Washington Nationals, Kansas City Cowboys, Baltimore Orioles, and St. Louis Browns from 1884 to 1893. He is sometimes credited with creating the first catcher's mitt when he was trying to play through an 1888 finger injury. Though Gunson was young and did not need the money, Jim Manning was going to help him patent it once Manning returned from a summer baseball tour. Gunson said that he told some other players about the glove and that many other players began using such a mitt before Manning came home.

Gunson died at his Philadelphia home in 1942.
