= Jim Green (baseball) =

American baseball player (1854–1912)

- Third baseman
- Born: May 22, 1854; Windham County, Connecticut, U.S.
- Died: December 12, 1912 (aged 58); Cleveland, Ohio, U.S.
- Batted: Unknown Threw: Unknown

MLB debut
- July 19, 1884, for the Washington Nationals (UA)

Last MLB appearance
- August 4, 1884, for the Washington Nationals (UA)

MLB statistics
- Batting average: .139
- Hits: 5
- RBIs: 4
- Stats at Baseball Reference

Teams
- Washington Nationals (1884)

James F. Green (May 22, 1854 – December 12, 1912) was an American Major League Baseball third baseman who played in ten games for the 1884 Washington Nationals of the Union Association. He later played in the Southern League in 1885 and the Tri-State League in 1888–1889.
