= Milo Lockwood =

American baseball player (1858–1897)

- Outfielder/Pitcher
- Born: April 7, 1858; Solon, Ohio
- Died: October 9, 1897 (aged 39); Economy, Pennsylvania
- Batted: Unknown Threw: Unknown

MLB debut
- April 17, 1884, for the Washington Nationals

Last MLB appearance
- May 26, 1884, for the Washington Nationals

MLB statistics
- Batting average: .209
- Runs batted in: 9
- Earned run average: 7.32
- Stats at Baseball Reference

Teams
- Washington Nationals (1884)

Milo Hathaway Lockwood (April 7, 1858 – October 9, 1897), was a Major League Baseball outfielder and pitcher who played for the 1884 Washington Nationals of the Union Association.

== Death ==
In October 1897, Lockwood, then a wealthy businessman, shot himself in the head in an Economy, Pennsylvania hotel room that he was sharing with his wife. His suicide was attributed to sciatica which had afflicted him for years.
