= Mark Creegan =

American baseball player (1864–1920)

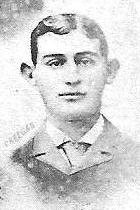
- Outfielder
- Born: July 31, 1864; San Francisco, California, U.S.
- Died: September 29, 1920 (aged 56); San Francisco, California, U.S.
- Batted: Unknown Threw: Unknown

MLB debut
- April 17, 1884, for the Washington Nationals

Last MLB appearance
- May 11, 1884, for the Washington Nationals

MLB statistics
- Batting average: .152
- Hits: 5
- RBIs: 4
- Stats at Baseball Reference

Teams
- Washington Nationals (1884)

Mark Creegan (born as Mark Kragen) (July 31, 1864 – September 29, 1920) was an American Major League Baseball outfielder who played in nine games for the 1884 Washington Nationals of the Union Association. He also played for a number of different minor league teams in his home town of San Francisco.
