= Mike Lawlor (baseball) =

American baseball player (1854–1918)

- Catcher
- Born: March 11, 1854; Troy, New York, U.S.
- Died: August 3, 1918 (aged 64); Troy, New York, U.S.
- Batted: Unknown Threw: Right

MLB debut
- May 27, 1880, for the Troy Trojans

Last MLB appearance
- July 23, 1884, for the Washington Nationals

MLB statistics
- Batting average: .063
- Hits: 1
- Runs batted in: 0
- Stats at Baseball Reference

Teams
- Troy Trojans (1880); Washington Nationals (1884)

Michael H. Lawlor (March 11, 1854 – August 3, 1918) was an American Major League Baseball catcher who played two seasons in the majors during the 19th century.
