= Charlie Kalbfus =

American baseball player (1864–1941)

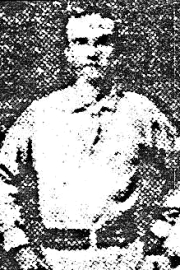
- Outfielder
- Born: December 28, 1864; Washington, D.C.
- Died: November 18, 1941 (aged 76); Washington, D.C.
- Batted: Right Threw: Right

MLB debut
- April 18, 1884, for the Washington Nationals

Last MLB appearance
- April 18, 1884, for the Washington Nationals

MLB statistics
- Batting average: .200
- Hits: 1
- Runs batted in: 1
- Stats at Baseball Reference

Teams
- Washington Nationals (1884)

Charles Henry Kalbfus (a.k.a. Skinny) (December 28, 1864 – November 18, 1941), was a Major League Baseball outfielder who played in one game on April 18, 1884, for the Washington Nationals of the Union Association. He died on November 18, 1941, in Takoma Park, Maryland, United States.
