= Bill Hughes (first baseman) =

American baseball player (1860–1928)

- First baseman/Outfielder/Pitcher
- Born: 1860; Pennsylvania, U.S.
- Died: December 2, 1928 (aged 68); Brooklyn, New York, U.S.
- Batted: Left Threw: Left

MLB debut
- September 28, 1884, for the Washington Nationals

Last MLB appearance
- October 5, 1885, for the Philadelphia Athletics

MLB statistics
- Batting average: .138
- Win–loss record: 0–2
- Earned run average: 4.86
- Stats at Baseball Reference

Teams
- Washington Nationals (1884); Philadelphia Athletics (1885)

William W. Hughes (1860 – December 2, 1928) was an American first baseman/outfielder and pitcher in Major League Baseball who played for the 1884 Washington Nationals of the Union Association and the 1885 Philadelphia Athletics of the American Association.
