= Pop Joy =

American baseball player (1860–1937)

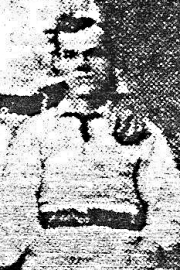
- First baseman
- Born: June 11, 1860; Washington, D.C.
- Died: June 28, 1937 (aged 77); Washington, D.C.
- Batted: Unknown Threw: Unknown

MLB debut
- June 11, 1884, for the Washington Nationals

Last MLB appearance
- September 24, 1884, for the Washington Nationals

MLB statistics
- Batting average: .215
- Hits: 28
- Runs batted in: 12
- Stats at Baseball Reference

Teams
- Washington Nationals (1884)

Aloysius C. Joy (June 11, 1860 – June 28, 1937) was a Major League Baseball first baseman who played for the Washington Nationals of the Union Association in 1884.
