= Henry Moore (baseball) =

American baseball player (c.1862–1902)

- Outfielder
- Born: ca. 1862
- Died: June 3, 1902
- Batted: Left Threw: Right

MLB debut
- April 17, 1884, for the Washington Nationals (UA)

Last MLB appearance
- September 18, 1884, for the Washington Nationals (UA)

MLB statistics
- Batting average: .336
- Hits: 155
- Home runs: 1
- Stats at Baseball Reference

Teams
- Washington Nationals (UA) (1884)

Henry S. "Hen" Moore (ca. 1862 - June 3, 1902) was a 19th-century major league left fielder. He played for the Washington Nationals of the Union Association in 1884.

Moore replaced 16-year-old Chick Carroll as the team's starting left fielder early in the season. His .820 fielding percentage in the outfield was slightly above the league average. He finished third in the league in hits (155), batting average (.336), and on-base percentage (.362), and led the league in games played (111) and singles (126).

Moore had a quick temper, and was blacklisted by multiple major and minor leagues during his career for unsportsmanlike conduct, including refusing to field balls hit to his position, and refusing to run the bases after hits.
