= Patrick Larkins =

American baseball player (1860–1918)

- Third baseman
- Born: February 14, 1860; New York City, U.S.
- Died: November 25, 1918 (aged 58); Brooklyn, New York, U.S.
- Batted: Left Threw: Unknown

MLB debut
- May 29, 1884, for the Washington Nationals

Last MLB appearance
- July 16, 1884, for the Washington Nationals

MLB statistics
- Batting average: .243
- Hits: 17
- Runs: 11
- Stats at Baseball Reference

Teams
- Washington Nationals (1884)

Patrick C. Larkins (February 14, 1860–November 25, 1918) was an American Major League Baseball third baseman who played in 17 games for the Washington Nationals of the Union Association in 1884. Prior to 2017, he was only identified as P. Larkin.
