= Gus Alberts =

American baseball player (1860–1912)

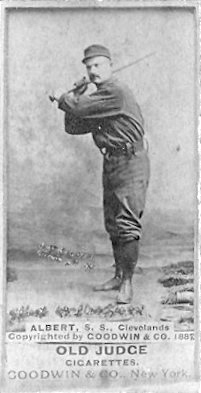
- Third baseman/Shortstop
- Born: September 1860; Reading, Pennsylvania, U.S.
- Died: May 7, 1912 (aged 51); Idaho Springs, Colorado, U.S.
- Batted: Right Threw: Right

MLB debut
- May 1, 1884, for the Pittsburgh Alleghenys

Last MLB appearance
- September 22, 1891, for the Milwaukee Brewers

MLB statistics
- At bats: 426
- RBI: 50
- Home Runs: 1
- Batting average: .197
- Stats at Baseball Reference

Teams
- Pittsburgh Alleghenys (1884); Washington Nationals (1884); Cleveland Blues (1888); Milwaukee Brewers (1891)

August Peterson Alberts (September 1860 – May 7, 1912) was an American infielder in Major League Baseball from 1884 to 1891. He played for the Pittsburgh Alleghenys (1884), Cleveland Blues (1888), and the Milwaukee Brewers (1891) of the American Association and very briefly for the Washington Nationals of the Union Association (1884). Alberts threw and batted right-handed. He was 5'6 ½" and 180 lbs.

In 120 games he batted .197 (84-for-426) and scored 62 runs. An average third baseman and shortstop for the times, he had a fielding percentage of .867. Of the 120 appearances, 102 of those games were with the Cleveland Blues in 1888. With them, he had a .206 batting average and 26 stolen bases.

Alberts was born in Reading, Pennsylvania. He died suddenly at 52 near the Brunswick Flats area in Idaho Springs, Colorado. He had resided in Alice, Idaho Springs, when he suddenly became ill with pneumonia and was taken to Idaho Springs to recuperate. Alberts ventured onto the streets just an hour before dying and was ordered to return inside by a physician. He worked in the mines known as the Chesapeake group located between Alice and St. Mary. He was employed by the Clara Exploration and Development Company. He was interred at Mount Olivet Cemetery in Wheat Ridge, Colorado.
