= Alex Voss =

American baseball player (1858–1906)

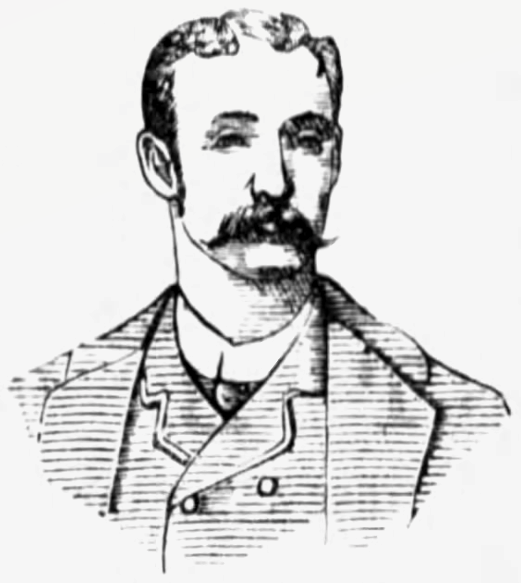
- An illustration from 1885
- Pitcher
- Born: May 16, 1858; Roswell, Georgia, U.S.
- Died: August 31, 1906 (aged 48); Cincinnati, Ohio, U.S.
- Batted: Right Threw: Right

MLB debut
- April 17, 1884, for the Washington Nationals

Last MLB appearance
- September 12, 1884, for the Kansas City Cowboys

MLB statistics
- Win–loss record: 5–20
- Strikeouts: 129
- Earned run average: 3.72
- Stats at Baseball Reference

Teams
- Washington Nationals (1884); Kansas City Cowboys (1884)

Alexander Voss (May 16, 1858 – August 31, 1906) was an American Major League Baseball pitcher in 1884. He played for the Washington Nationals and Kansas City Cowboys of the Union Association.
