= Bill Rollinson =

American baseball player (1856–1938)

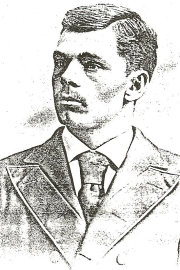
- Catcher
- Born: June 10, 1856; Fairfield, Maine, U.S.
- Died: September 28, 1938 (aged 82); Bristow, Virginia, U.S.
- Batted: Unknown Threw: Unknown

MLB debut
- June 17, 1884, for the Washington Nationals

Last MLB appearance
- June 17, 1884, for the Washington Nationals

MLB statistics
- Batting average: .000
- Hits: 0
- Runs batted in: 0
- Stats at Baseball Reference

Teams
- Washington Nationals (1884)

Bill Rollinson was an alias used by William Henry Winslow (June 10, 1856 – September 28, 1938), an American Major League Baseball catcher who played in one game on June 17, 1884, for the Washington Nationals of the Union Association.

== Baseball ==
Winslow played catcher for the Brown Bears baseball team in 1879 and 1880 and was captain of the team the latter season. He also appeared in four games for the Worcester Grays of the National Association during the 1879 season. In 1884, he was a member of the Holyoke team in the Massachusetts State Association and played one game for the Washington Nationals of the Union Association. He went hitless in thee at-bats and committed four errors. In 1885, he played for Lawrence (Eastern New England League) and Springfield (Southern New England League).

== Education ==
After graduating from Brown, Winslow spent five years as a high school principal in Adams, Massachusetts. He earned his Master of Arts degree from New York University in 1895. After a year as a supervising principal in Orange, New Jersey, Winslow spent five and a half years as superintendent of schools in Bath, Maine. From 1901 to 1908, held the same position in Revere, Massachusetts. On December 1, 1908, he began teaching pedagogy courses to normal school students at the Southern University at New Orleans. He spent the 1909–10 school year as superintendent of schools in Contoocook, New Hampshire. On June 29, 1910, he was named superintendent of schools in Cumberland, Rhode Island. In 1916, he became principal of the junior high school in Brooksville, Florida.

== Personal life ==
In October 1880, Winslow married Esther Fisk in Providence, Rhode Island. They had four children. Esther Winslow died in 1899. On April 19, 1909, he married Bessie Lee of Overall, Virginia. They had five children. Winslow was a freemason and a Quaker. He died on September 28, 1938, at his home near Bristow, Virginia.
