= James Lehan =

American baseball player (1856–1946)

- Infielder / Outfielder
- Born: May 14, 1856; Hartford, Connecticut, U.S.
- Died: July 18, 1946 (aged 90); Hartford, Connecticut, U.S.
- Batted: Unknown Threw: Unknown

MLB debut
- April 26, 1884, for the Washington Nationals

Last MLB appearance
- April 29, 1884, for the Washington Nationals

MLB statistics
- Batting average: .333
- Hits: 4
- RBIs: 1
- Stats at Baseball Reference

Teams
- Washington Nationals (1884)

James Francis Lehan (a.k.a. Mike Lehane) (May 14, 1856 – July 18, 1946) was an American Major League Baseball (MLB) infielder and outfielder who played for the Washington Nationals of the Union Association in 1884.
