= Thomas Tinney =

American baseball player (1855–1905)

Tom Tinney
- Right Fielder
- Born: 1855; Philadelphia
- Died: May 10, 1905 (aged 49–50); Philadelphia

MLB debut
- April 28, 1884, for the Washington Nationals

Last MLB appearance
- June 24, 1884, for the Washington Nationals

MLB statistics
- Batting average: .235
- Hits: 28
- Runs: 17
- Stats at Baseball Reference

Teams
- Washington Nationals (1884)

Thomas Brown Tinney (1855 – May 10, 1905) was a Major League Baseball right fielder who played in 32 games for the Washington Nationals of the Union Association in 1884.
