= Emory Nusz =

American baseball player (1859–1903)

- Outfielder
- Born: November 2, 1859; Frederick, Maryland, U.S.
- Died: July 26, 1903 (aged 43); Baltimore, Maryland, U.S.
- Batted: Unknown Threw: Unknown

MLB debut
- April 26, 1884, for the Washington Nationals

Last MLB appearance
- April 26, 1884, for the Washington Nationals

MLB statistics
- At bats: 4
- Runs batted in: 0
- Home runs: 0
- Batting average: .000
- Stats at Baseball Reference

Teams
- Washington Nationals (1884)

William Emory Nusz (November 2, 1859 – July 26, 1903) was an American professional baseball player who played in one game for the Washington Nationals of the Union Association during the 1884 season.

Nusz was born in Frederick, Maryland. In April 1903, he was married to Amanda E. Morgan. On July 26 of the same year, however, he shot himself in the head with a revolver in his home and died. Nusz had been working as an electrician and, according to his brother, had been in failing health.
