= Chick Carroll =

American baseball player

- Outfielder
- Batted: Unknown Threw: Unknown

MLB debut
- April 17, 1884, for the Washington Nationals

Last MLB appearance
- April 21, 1884, for the Washington Nationals

MLB statistics
- Batting Average: .250
- Hits: 4
- Runs: 1
- Stats at Baseball Reference

Teams
- Washington Nationals (1884)

Edward "Chick" Carroll, was a 19th-century American major league outfielder. In 1884 he was the starting left fielder in the first four games (April 17–21) for the Washington Nationals of the Union Association. At the plate he went 4-for-16 (.250) and scored one run, and in the field he had three putouts, one assist, and four errors for a fielding percentage of .500. He was replaced by Henry Moore thereafter, who fielded .820 in 105 games, which was comparable to the league average for outfielders that season.
