= John Shoupe =

American baseball player (1851–1920)

- Shortstop
- Born: September 30, 1851; Cincinnati, Ohio, U.S.
- Died: February 13, 1920 (aged 68); Cincinnati, Ohio, U.S.
- Batted: Left Threw: Left

MLB debut
- May 3, 1879, for the Troy Trojans

Last MLB appearance
- May 28, 1884, for the Washington Nationals

MLB statistics
- Batting average: .127
- Home runs: 0
- Runs batted in: 1
- Stats at Baseball Reference

Teams
- Troy Trojans (1879); St. Louis Brown Stockings (1882); Washington Nationals (1884)

John F. Shoupe (September 30, 1851, in Cincinnati – February 13, 1920, in Cincinnati) was a 19th-century American professional baseball player. Shoupe appeared in 11 games for the Troy Trojans in 1879, 2 games for the St. Louis Brown Stockings in 1882, and 1 game for the Washington Nationals (UA) in 1884. Sometimes he is credited as John Shoup.
