= John Ward (outfielder) =

American baseball player

- Outfielder
- Born: Washington, D.C.
- Batted: Unknown Threw: Unknown

MLB debut
- May 23, 1884, for the Washington Nationals

Last MLB appearance
- May 23, 1884, for the Washington Nationals

MLB statistics
- Batting average: .250
- Home runs: 0
- Runs batted in: 0
- Stats at Baseball Reference

Teams
- Washington Nationals (1884)

John E. Ward was an American baseball player who played center field in one game for the Washington Nationals of the Union Association in 1884. In his single major league appearance, Ward recorded one hit in four at bats.
