= Charlie Geggus =

American baseball player (1862–1917)

- Pitcher/Center fielder
- Born: March 25, 1862; San Francisco, California, U.S.
- Died: January 16, 1917 (aged 54); San Francisco, California, U.S.
- Batted: Unknown Threw: Unknown

MLB debut
- August 7, 1884, for the Washington Nationals (UA)

Last MLB appearance
- October 19, 1884, for the Washington Nationals (UA)

MLB statistics
- Win–loss record: 10–9
- Earned run average: 2.54
- Strikeouts: 156
- Stats at Baseball Reference

Teams
- Washington Nationals (UA) (1884)

Charles Frederick Geggus (March 25, 1862 – January 16, 1917) was an American professional baseball player who pitched and played center field for one season in Major League Baseball. He played for the 1884 Washington Nationals of the Union Association.
