= Chris Fulmer =

American baseball player (1858–1931)

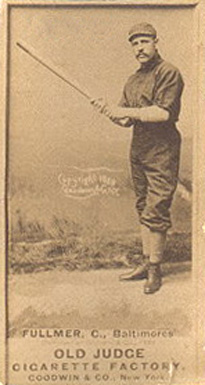
- Catcher
- Born: July 4, 1858; Tamaqua, Pennsylvania, U.S.
- Died: November 9, 1931 (aged 73); Tamaqua, Pennsylvania, U.S.
- Batted: Right Threw: Right

MLB debut
- August 4, 1884, for the Washington Nationals

Last MLB appearance
- June 27, 1889, for the Baltimore Orioles

MLB statistics
- Batting average: .247
- Home runs: 1
- Runs batted in: 85
- Stats at Baseball Reference

Teams
- Washington Nationals (1884); Baltimore Orioles (1886–1889)

Christopher Fulmer (July 4, 1858 – November 9, 1931) was an American Major League Baseball player who played catcher. He played for the Washington Nationals of the Union Association in 1884 and for the Baltimore Orioles of the American Association from 1886 to 1889.
