= John Deasley =

American baseball player (1864–1910)

- Shortstop
- Born: January 1864; Philadelphia, Pennsylvania, United States
- Died: January 1, 1910 (aged 47–48); Philadelphia, Pennsylvania
- Batted: Unknown Threw: Unknown

MLB debut
- June 17, 1884, for the Washington Nationals

Last MLB appearance
- September 8, 1884, for the Kansas City Cowboys

MLB statistics
- Games played: 44
- Runs scored: 23
- Batting average: .207
- Stats at Baseball Reference

Teams
- Washington Nationals (1884); Kansas City Cowboys (1884)

John Deasley (1864–1910) was a professional baseball player. In 1884, he saw action in 44 games for the Washington Nationals and Kansas City Cowboys of the Union Association. He hit just .207 that season and never played in a real major league.

Deasley played in various minor leagues until 1890. He died on New Year's Eve, 1910, at the age of 47 and is interred at Mount Moriah Cemetery in Philadelphia, Pennsylvania.
