= Ed Yewell =

American baseball player (1862–1940)

- Utility player
- Born: August 22, 1862; Washington, D.C.
- Died: September 15, 1940 (aged 78); Washington, D.C.
- Batted: Unknown Threw: Unknown

MLB debut
- May 12, 1884, for the Washington Nationals (AA)

Last MLB appearance
- August 7, 1884, for the Washington Nationals (UA)

MLB statistics
- Batting average: .237
- Home runs: 0
- Runs scored: 14
- Stats at Baseball Reference

Teams
- Washington Nationals (AA) (1884); Washington Nationals (UA) (1884)

Edwin Leonard Yewell (August 22, 1862 – September 15, 1940) was a professional baseball player. Yewell played Major League Baseball in the 1884 season for two teams named the Washington Nationals; one was in the American Association (AA) and the other was in the Union Association (UA). In 28 total games, he batted .237 in 97 at bats, with three doubles and one triple. He played defensively as a second baseman, shortstop, third baseman, and outfielder, with his most appearances coming at second base with 11.

Yewell made his debut for the AA's Nationals on May 12, 1884, recording one hit in three at bats. On July 2, in a game against the Cincinnati Red Stockings, he was hit by a Gus Shallix pitch; Yewell returned to the Nationals by August, but author David Nemec states that "he was never the same player." After his lone Major League season, Yewell remained with the UA's Nationals, who had joined the Eastern League. He became a patent attorney after the end of his playing career. Following an illness of approximately a week, Yewell died on September 15, 1940, at a hospital in Washington, D.C. He was buried in that city, at Glenwood Cemetery.
