= Brady's Bend, Pennsylvania =

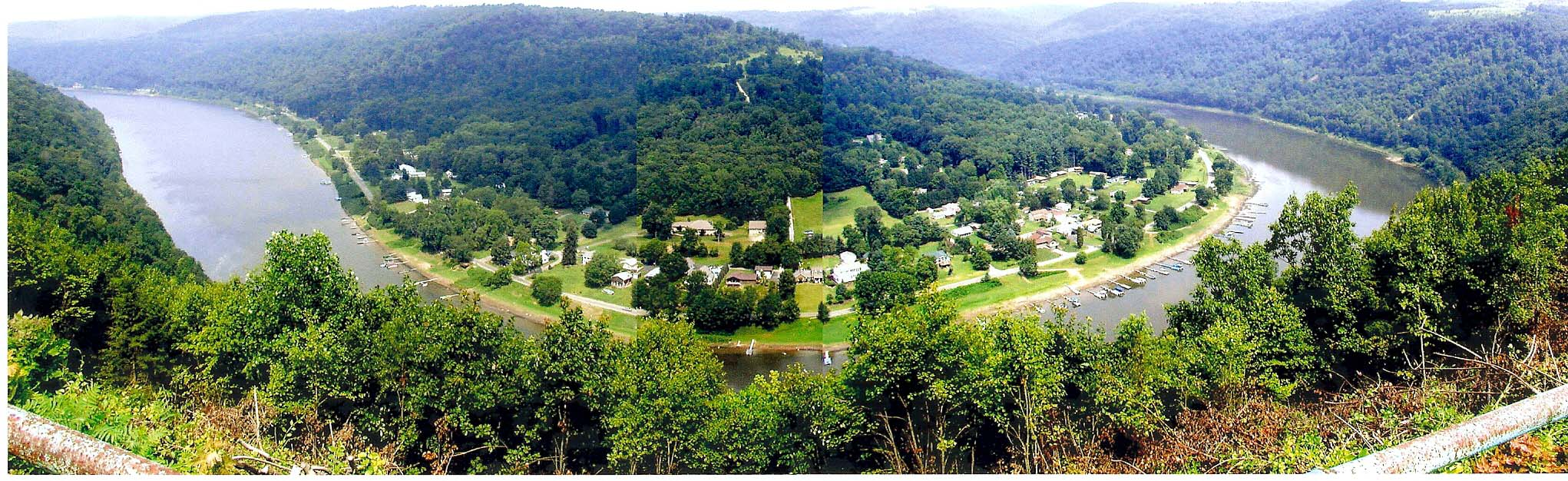
Brady's Bend, Pennsylvania. The photo is a composite of three shots taken about 1,400 ft. above sea level.

Brady's Bend, Pennsylvania 1920s

Brady's Bend is a location in East Brady, Clarion County, Pennsylvania. It is named for Captain Samuel Brady (1756–1795), frontier scout and the subject of many legends. Near this location on the Allegheny River in Western Pennsylvania June 1779—in what was then Seneca territory – Brady led a force seeking to redress the killing of a settler and her four children, and the taking of two children as prisoners. The force surrounded a party of seven Indians—apparently both Seneca and Munsee – killing their leader (a Munsee warrior) and freeing the two children.

When Peter Henry was fourteen years of age, their home, six miles from Greensburg, Pennsylvania, was attacked by a band of Indians, and his mother and the two youngest children were killed. Peter and two younger children were taken prisoners, but they had proceeded only a short distance when the youngest child began to cry and was immediately tomahawked. The Indians carried Peter and his sister to the point since known as Brady's Bend, where they went into camp. The redoubtable Captain Brady, at the head of a party of scouts, had followed the party, attacked them in the night while asleep, and only one of the band escaped to tell the tale. Brady took the children to Fort Pitt, and subsequently delivered them safe to their father.

The Bradys Bend Historical Society provides an account from their sources. The Indians had made an inroad into the Sewickly Settlement (perhaps in the region now known as Sewickley Township, Pennsylvania) and in a particular case killed a woman and four of her children and took two children prisoners, their father being absent. The alarm was brought to Pittsburgh, and Colonel Daniel Brodhead sent three of the "brother officers" from Fort Pitt about June 10, 1779, to reconnoiter the Seneca country.

Brady and his party, instead of moving towards Sewickly, as the first detachment had done, painted themselves, donned Indian dress, crossed the Allegheny and advanced up its west side, carefully examining the mouths of all its principal tributaries, especially the eastern ones. On reaching a point opposite the Mahoning Creek, they discovered the Indians' canoes moored at the southwestern bank of the creek. Here just below the "great bend" in the middle of June 1779, Brady was about to experience one of his most notable and successful Indian fights.

The outcome of Brady's fight was reported by Colonel Brodhead via letter on June 24 to President Reed (first chief executive of Pennsylvania) and to General Washington, June 26, 1779.

With the help of the Delaware Chief Nanowland who was his ally against the Senecas, Captain Brady fell in with seven Indians of this party—that had committed the depredations at Sewickly—about fifteen miles above Kittanning, from the site of Fort Armstrong (Pennsylvania), where the Indians had chosen an advantageous situation for their camp. He surrounded them and attacked at break of day. Subsequently he killed the Indian captain, who was a notorious warrior of the Munsee nation, and mortally wounded most of them; but they being encamped near a remarkable thicket, and having as customary with them, stopped their wounds just after they received them, could not be found. Captain Brady retook six horses, the two prisoners, the scalps, all their plunder, all the Indians' guns, tomahawks, match-coats, and moccasins.

The two prisoners were Peter and Margaret Henry, ten- and twelve-year-old children of Frederick Henry. They had been captives for about two weeks before they were rescued by Brady's party. Peter Henry settled in Butler County, Pennsylvania. He was a member of Captain Abraham Brinker's company under Colonel John Purviance at Erie, Pennsylvania, in the War of 1812. He was a farmer, raised a large family and was highly respected. He died in his ninety-fourth year in 1858. Margaret Henry married and lived in Westmoreland County, Pennsylvania.
