= Jim McDonald (third baseman) =

American baseball player (1860–1914)

- Third baseman/Outfielder
- Born: August 6, 1860; San Francisco, California, U.S.
- Died: September 14, 1914 (aged 54); San Francisco, California, U.S.
- Batted: Right Threw: Unknown

MLB debut
- June 20, 1884, for the Washington Nationals

Last MLB appearance
- October 10, 1885, for the Buffalo Bisons

MLB statistics
- Batting average: .145
- Home runs: 0
- Runs batted in: 0
- Stats at Baseball Reference

Teams
- Washington Nationals (1884); Pittsburgh Alleghenys (1884); Buffalo Bisons (1885)

James Augustus McDonald (August 6, 1860 – September 14, 1914) was an American Major League Baseball player who was a third baseman. He played in three separate major leagues in 1884–1885, the Union Association, American Association and the National League. He also spent a large amount of time (1878–1883, 1888–1894) playing on minor league teams on the west coast, particularly in the California League.
