= Ed McKenna =

American baseball player

- Catcher/Outfielder
- Born: St. Louis, Missouri, U.S.
- Batted: Unknown Threw: Unknown

MLB debut
- 1884, for the Washington Nationals

Last MLB appearance
- July 5, 1884, for the Washington Nationals

MLB statistics
- Batting average: .188
- Home runs: 0
- Runs batted in: 0
- Stats at Baseball Reference

Teams
- Washington Nationals (1884)

Edward J. McKenna was an American professional baseball player who played in 32 games for the 1884 Washington Nationals of the Union Association.
