= Frank McKee (baseball) =

American baseball player

- Utility player
- Born: Philadelphia, Pennsylvania, U.S.
- Batted: Unknown Threw: Unknown

MLB debut
- June 11, 1884, for the Washington Nationals

Last MLB appearance
- July 3, 1884, for the Washington Nationals

MLB statistics
- Batting average: .176
- Hits: 3
- RBIs: 2
- Stats at Baseball Reference

Teams
- Washington Nationals (1884)

Frank McKee was an American professional baseball player. He played part of one season in Major League Baseball for the 1884 Washington Nationals of the Union Association. He played in four games, spending time as an outfielder, third baseman and catcher.
