= John Mulligan (baseball) =

American baseball player

- Third Baseman
- Born: Unknown; Philadelphia, Pennsylvania, U.S.
- Died: Unknown
- Batted: Unknown Threw: Unknown

MLB debut
- June 14, 1884, for the Washington Nationals

Last MLB appearance
- June 14, 1884, for the Washington Nationals

MLB statistics
- Batting average: .250
- Hits: 1
- RBIs: 2
- Stats at Baseball Reference

Teams
- Washington Nationals (1884)

John Mulligan was an American Major League Baseball third baseman who played in one game on June 14, 1884 for the Washington Nationals of the Union Association. He finished the game with a .250 batting average and a .250 at bat average.
