= Dan McGeehan =

American baseball player (1885–1955)

- Second baseman
- Born: June 7, 1885; Jeddo, Pennsylvania, U.S.
- Died: July 12, 1955 (aged 70); Hazleton, Pennsylvania, U.S.
- Batted: Right Threw: Right

MLB debut
- April 22, 1911, for the St. Louis Cardinals

Last MLB appearance
- April 24, 1911, for the St. Louis Cardinals

MLB statistics
- Games played: 3
- At bats: 9
- Hits: 2
- Stats at Baseball Reference

Teams
- St. Louis Cardinals (1911)

Daniel De Sales McGeehan (June 7, 1885 – July 12, 1955) was an American infielder in Major League Baseball who played in 1911 for the St. Louis Cardinals. Listed at 5 ft 6 in (1.68 m), 135 lb, he batted and threw right-handed. His older brother, Connie McGeehan, played for the Philadelphia Athletics in the 1903 season.

Born in Jeddo, Pennsylvania, McGeehan played briefly for the Cardinals as a backup for second baseman Miller Huggins.

In a three-game career, McGeehan had two singles in nine at-bats for a .222 batting average, droving in one run, but did not have any hits for extra bases.

He also played seven seasons in the Minor leagues between 1909 and 1915, most of them with the Scranton Miners and Allentown.

McGeehan died in Hazleton, Pennsylvania, at the age of 70.

== Sources ==
- Baseball Reference – Major league profile
- Baseball Reference – Minor league career
