= William McLaughlin (baseball) =

American baseball player (1861–1936)

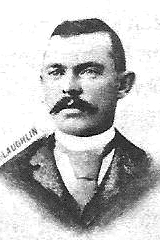
- Shortstop
- Born: July 3, 1861; Sacramento County, California, U.S.
- Died: March 21, 1936 (aged 74); Gig Harbor, Washington, U.S.
- Batted: Unknown Threw: Unknown

MLB debut
- May 3, 1884, for the Washington Nationals

Last MLB appearance
- May 18, 1884, for the Washington Nationals

MLB statistics
- Batting average: .189
- Hits: 7
- RBIs: 3
- Stats at Baseball Reference

Teams
- Washington Nationals (1884)

William McLaughlin (July 3, 1861 – March 21, 1936) was an American Major League Baseball shortstop who played in ten games for the Washington Nationals of the Union Association in 1884. He was a graduate of Sacramento High School.
