= Connie McGeehan =

American baseball player (1882-1907)

- Pitcher
- Born: August 25, 1882; Drifton, Pennsylvania, U.S.
- Died: July 4, 1907 (aged 24); Hazleton, Pennsylvania, U.S.
- Batted: Unknown Threw: Right

MLB debut
- July 15, 1903, for the Philadelphia Athletics

Last MLB appearance
- August 14, 1903, for the Philadelphia Athletics

MLB statistics
- Win–loss record: 1–0
- Earned run average: 4.50
- Strikeouts: 4
- Stats at Baseball Reference

Teams
- Philadelphia Athletics (1903)

Cornelius Bernard McGeehan (August 25, 1882 – July 4, 1907) was an American right-handed pitcher and left fielder who played in Major League Baseball during the 1903 season.

Born in Drifton, Pennsylvania, McGeehan attended the College of the Holy Cross. His younger brother, Dan McGeehan, was a member of the 1911 St. Louis Cardinals.

McGeehan started his baseball career in 1898 with the Lock Haven Normals/Maroons of the Central Pennsylvania League, playing for them one year before joining the Philadelphia Athletics of Connie Mack in 1903.

He posted a 1–0 record with a 4.50 earned run average in three relief appearances with the Athletics, giving up five runs on nine hits and one walk while striking out four in 10.0 innings of work.

McGeehan died in Hazleton, Pennsylvania, at the age of 24.
