= Jerry McCormick =

American baseball player (1861–1905)

- Third baseman
- Born: December 31, 1861; Philadelphia, Pennsylvania, U.S.
- Died: September 11, 1905 (aged 43); Philadelphia, Pennsylvania, U.S.
- Batted: Unknown Threw: Unknown

MLB debut
- May 1, 1883, for the Baltimore Orioles

Last MLB appearance
- October 19, 1884, for the Washington Nationals

MLB statistics
- Batting average: .262
- Home runs: 0
- Runs batted in: 0
- Stats at Baseball Reference

Teams
- Baltimore Orioles (1883); Philadelphia Keystones (1884); Washington Nationals (1884)

James J. McCormick (December 31, 1861 – September 11, 1905) was an American third baseman in Major League Baseball for the 1883 Baltimore Orioles of the American Association and the 1884 Philadelphia Keystones and Washington Nationals of the Union Association.

== Sources ==
- Career statistics from Baseball Reference · Baseball Reference (Minors) · Retrosheet · Baseball Almanac
