= Washington Nationals (Union Association) =

The 1884 Washington Nationals were a baseball team belonging to the Union Association. They were managed by Michael Scanlon and finished in seventh place with a record of 47–65. Their home games were played at Capitol Grounds. The Nationals folded with the rest of the Union Association when it was discontinued after 1884, its only season of operation.

This team is distinct from the other 1884 Washington Nationals franchise, a different team that played in the American Association the same year.

== See also ==
- 1884 Washington Nationals (UA) season
- Washington Nationals (disambiguation)
- Washington Senators (disambiguation)
- Washington Nationals current MLB team
