= Kansas City Blues (1885–1901) =

- 1885–1901; (1885, 1887–1888, 1890–1901); Kansas City, Missouri

Minor league affiliations
- Class: Class A (1885, 1887–1888, 1890–1901)
- League: Western League (1885, 1887, 1892, 1894–1899); Western Association (1888, 1890–1891, 1893); American League (1900); Western League (1901)

Major league affiliations
- Team: None

Minor league titles
- League titles (5): 1888; 1890; 1893; 1898; 1901

Team data
- Name: Kansas City Cowboys (1885, 1887, 1894); Kansas City Blues (1888, 1890–1893, 1895–1901)
- Ballpark: Association Park (1887); Exposition Park (1888, 1890–1901); Parade Park (1899)

The Kansas City Blues was the primary moniker of the minor league baseball teams based in Kansas City, Missouri between 1885 and 1901. The Kansas City minor league teams played as members of the Class A level Western League in 1885, 1887, 1892, and from 1894 to 1899, and the Western Association in 1888, 1890, 1891, and 1893. The Blues transitioned to the American League in 1900, a year before the league became a major league. In 1901, the Blues franchise relocated to become the Washington Senators, which eventually evolved into today's Minnesota Twins. Meanwhile, a minor league Kansas City Blues franchise was reformed and the team rejoined the eight-team 1901 Western League. The minor league team played under the "Cowboys" moniker in 1885, 1887 and 1894. The Kansas City Blues/Cowboys played home games at Exposition Park.

Returning to Western League play in 1901, the Blues preceded the Kansas City Blues franchise, who began play in the 1902 American Association. The 1902 Kansas City Blue Stockings were a new franchise who replaced the Blues as members of the Western League.

The major league Kansas City Cowboys also played in Kansas City during the Western Association Kansas City Blues era.

Baseball Hall of Fame members Kid Nichols played for the 1888 Kansas City Blues and Joe McGinnity for the 1894 team.

== History ==
=== Western League/Western Association 1885–1888 ===
The Kansas City Cowboys began minor league play as charter members of the Western League in 1885. Kansas City joined the Cleveland Forest Citys, Indianapolis Hoosiers, Milwaukee Milwaukees, Omaha and Toledo Avengers teams in the six-team Western League. Kansas City placed third, playing the season under manager Ted Sullivan, who also served as the league president. With a record of 17–13, Kansas City finished 9 games behind first place Indianapolis Hoosiers in the final standings. Darby O'Brien of Kansas City led the Western League in batting average, hitting .362. Kansas City did not field a team in the Western League in 1886.

Kansas City returned to minor league play, rejoining the Western League in 1887. The Cowboys placed third in the ten-team Western League with a record of 58–54, playing under managers Joe Ellick and Bradley Patterson, finishing 30 games behind first place Topeka Golden Giants in the final standings.

In 1888, the renamed Kansas City Blues continued minor league play, becoming members of the eight-team Class A level Western Association. The Blues began play with the Chicago Maroons, Des Moines Prohibitionists, Milwaukee Brewers, Minneapolis Millers, Omaha Omahogs, St. Paul Apostles and St. Louis Whites joining Kansas City in the league.

The president of the Chicago Maroons franchise was Sam Morton, who also was serving a dual role as president of the Western Association in 1888.

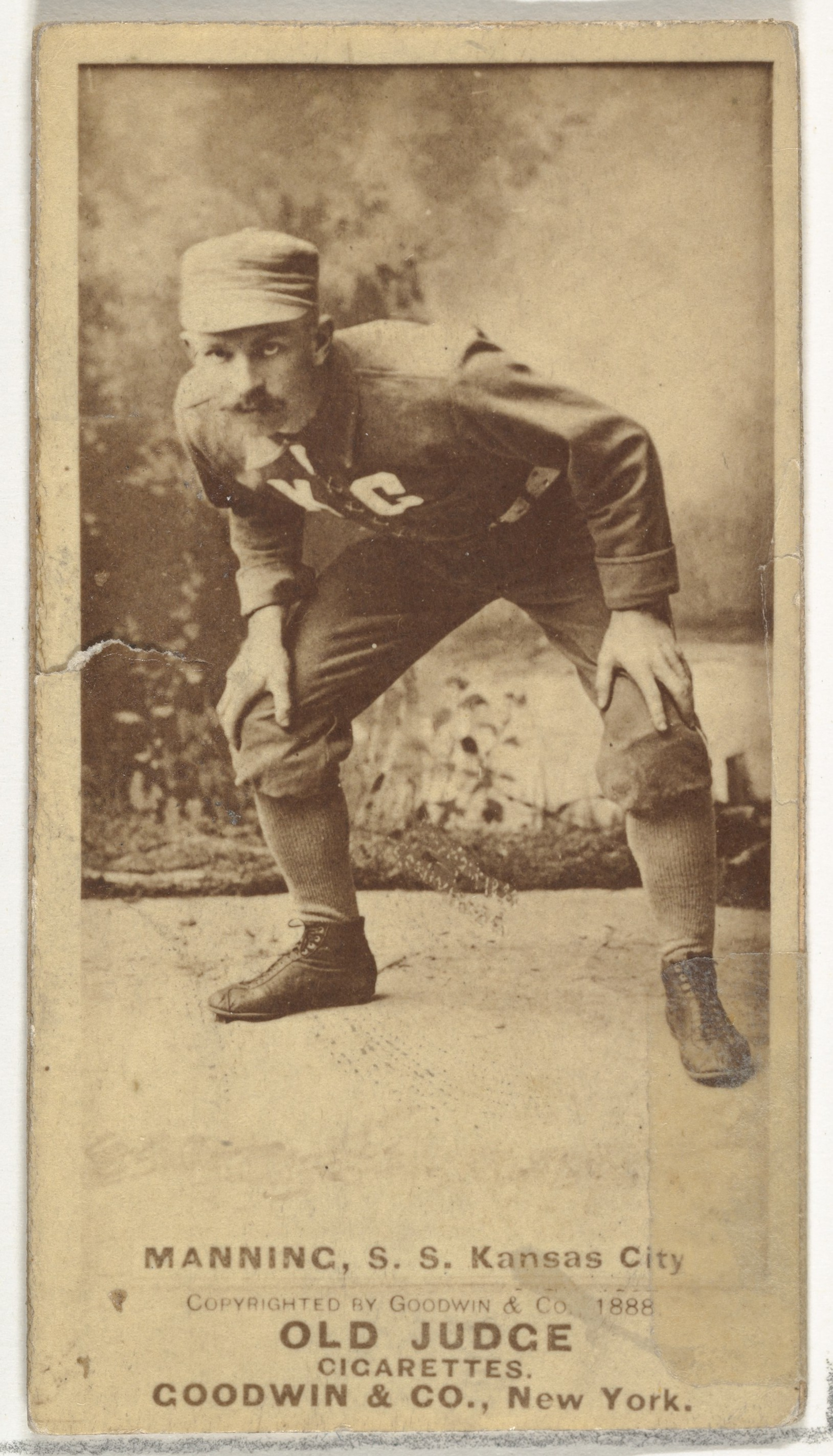
(1888) Old Judge baseball card, Jim Manning, Shortstop, Kansas City. Manning managed eleven seasons for the Blues franchise

The Kansas City Blues won the 1888 Western Association championship. The Blues began Western Association play on April 28, 1888, and finished the season in first place, playing under player/manager Jim Manning. With a record of 76–42, Kansas City finished ½ game ahead of second place Des Moines Prohibitionists in the final 1888 standings. Spud Johnson of Kansas City led the Western Association in batting average, hitting .342. Manning led the league with 101 stolen bases and 123 runs scored. Kansas City did not return to the 1889 Western Association.

Baseball Hall of Fame member Kid Nichols played for the Blues at age 18. Nichols pitched to a league leading 16–2 record and 1.14 ERA, pitching 18 complete games in 18 starts for the Blues.

=== Western League/Western Association 1890–1901 ===
In 1890, the Kansas City Blues returned to Western Association play and won a second league championship. With a record of 78–39, Kansas City finished first in the standings of the eight-team league under managers Charlie Hackett and Jim Manning. Kansas City finished one game ahead of second place Minneapolis Millers. Buster Hoover of Kansas City led the Western Association in hitting, with a batting average of .336, while Manning led the league with 96 stolen bases.

The 1891 Blues finished second in the Western Association behind the Sioux City Cornhuskers. With a record of 66–59, the Blues were just one game behind Sioux City, who finished 66–57 in the eight-team league. The Milwaukee Brewers were leading the standings in 1891, when they withdrew on August 16, 1893, with a 59–37 record to join the American Association. Kansas City was again managed by Jim Manning.

Kansas City continued minor league play in 1892, rejoining the renamed Western League, which folded during the season. In February 1892, Manning signed with Kansas City to again manage and play second base. The Kansas City correspondent to The Sporting Life wrote at the time: "The news that Manning is to be with us again was hailed with satisfaction by his great army of friends, who have learned to admire him as a player and a gentleman during his many years' service in Kansas City. It may be put down as certain that no club in the Western League will have a better manager or as good a second baseman as Jimmy Manning."

The Blues were in third place as the Class A level Western League disbanded on July 17, 1892. With a 33–33 record under Manning when the league folded, Kansas City was behind first place Columbus Reds (46–20) and second place Milwaukee Brewers. The Omaha Omahogs had a 31–31 record and at .500 were tied with Kansas City. The 1892 team is also referred to as the "Cowboys" in some references.

In 1893, the Blues continued play as members of the Class A level Western Association, as the league reduced in size to play as a four-team league. Kansas City began play with the Lawrence Jayhawks, St. Joseph Saints and Topeka Populists. The Blues won the 1893 Western Association championship, as the league folded during the season. After beginning play on May 1, 1893, the Western Association folded on June 20, 1893. Kansas City, also referred in some references as the "Cowboys" in 1893, had a record of 12–8, playing under manager William Lucas and finishing ½ game ahead of second place St. Joseph Saints. The 1893 Western Association standings were Kansas City Blues (12–8), St. Joseph Saints (11–8), Topeka Populists (8–12) and Lawrence Jayhawks (7–12).

In the fall of 1893, Manning was one of the three principal organizers of the new Western League, along with Charlie Cushman and John S. Barnes. The Western League was later renamed the American League in 1900. In September 1893, Manning visited Kansas City to lay the groundwork for establishing a new baseball club, including securing an option to play home games at the Exposition baseball grounds. The Kansas City Journal at the time called Manning "the most popular ball player who ever wore a Kansas City uniform." Manning told the press in Kansas City, "I spent six years here. Kansas City is like home to me ... If I put a new team here next year, as I hope to, it will be a winner, for that is what this town wants and what it demands." In November 1893, the Western League was formally established with Manning as the owner of the Kansas City Blues.

In 1894, the Blues franchise continued minor league play as members of the eight-team Western League, which was now under the direction of Hall of Fame member Ban Johnson. The 1894 team is listed in some references as the "Kansas City Cowboys." This franchise would evolve to become today's Minnesota Twins. The Blues ended the season with a record of 68–58, placing third in the Western League, finishing 6½ games behind first place Sioux City Corn Huskers. Team owner Manning continued as manager, also playing second base. Hall of Fame member Joe McGinnity pitched for the Blues at age 22. McGinnity had an 8–9 record with a 4.09 ERA in 19 appearances.

The 1895 Blues finished in third place in the eight-team Western League. With Manning continuing as manager, Kansas City ended the season with a 73–52 record, finishing seven games behind the Indianapolis Hoosiers in the final standings.

Continuing 1896 Western League play, the Blues placed fifth in the eight-team league. With a record of 69–66 under Manning, Kansas City finished 19½ games behind first place Minneapolis Millers in the final standings.

After many seasons of success on the field, the 1897 Blues team suffered a losing season and placed seventh in the standings. The team finished the Western League season with a 40–99 record, finishing 60 games behind first place Indianapolis Indians, as Manning again served as manager.

The 1898 Blues rebounded to capture the Western League championship. Kansas City finished the season with a record of 88–51 as Manning led the team to the championship. The Blues finished 1½ games ahead of second place Indianapolis Hoosiers in the final standings.

In 1899, the Blues ended their run of consecutive seasons of Western League play. The team placed seventh in the Western League standings. Kansas City finished with a record of 53–70, as Manning continued his manager run. Kansas City finished 22½ games behind first place Indianapolis Hoosiers

=== 1900 American League ===
In 1900, the Blues franchise remained as the Western League evolved to become the American League under the direction of league president Ban Johnson. The American League played the season as a Class A level minor league. A newly formed Western League played in 1900 without a Kansas City franchise. The Blues placed fifth in the American League standings, remaining under manager Manning. With a 69–70 record, the Blues finished 15 games behind first place Chicago White Stockings. The Milwaukee Brewers, Indianapolis Hoosiers and Detroit Tigers finished in second through fourth place. Kansas City finished ahead of the Cleveland Lake Shores, Buffalo Bisons and Minneapolis Millers in the final 1900 American League standings.

Kansas City Blues manager/president Manning was one of the organizers of the American League as a major league. Manning attended the organizational meeting in Chicago, Illinois in November 1900, as the representative of the Kansas City Blues, along with Charles Comiskey of Chicago, John McGraw of Baltimore, James D. Burns of Detroit and Henry Killilea of Milwaukee. At the meeting, it was decided that the new American League would become a major league and would not have a team in Kansas City, instead moving the franchise to Washington D.C. Manning was assigned responsibility for the proposed new club in Washington, D.C. Afterward, Manning stated: "I am reconciled to the idea of (Kansas City) moving into Washington. I will take my team there bodily, will add a couple of National Leaguers and will show them that American League ball is a long way faster than they imagine."

=== 1901 Western League ===
In 1901, the Kansas City Blues franchise relocated to become the Washington Senators, with Manning managing the Senators to a 60–71 record in the first major league season of the American League. A minor league Kansas City Blues franchise was reformed and the team rejoined the eight-team Western League. Returning to Western League play, the Blues won the 1901 championship. The Blues finished the season with a 79–44 record under manager George Tebeau, 10 games ahead of second place St. Paul Saints in the final league standings.

In 1902, the Kansas City Blue Stockings franchise was formed by Manning and Kid Nichols to continue play in the Western League, while the Kansas City Blues franchise became members of the American Association.

== The ballparks ==
The Kansas City Blues and Cowboys teams played home games at Exposition Park. The ballpark was located at Truman Avenue & Montgall Avenue, Kansas City, Missouri.

On August 28, 1894, Exposition Park was site of one of the first night games when the Kansas City Blues hosted the Sioux City Cornhuskers. 3,000 fans were in attendance for the night game.

The 1887, Kansas City Cowboys were noted to have played home games at Association Park. The ballpark was located at Lydia Avenua and Tracy Avenue, Kansas City, Missouri.

In 1899, the Kansas City Blues played some home games at Parade Park. The park is still in use today as a public park with a major league baseball academy. The site is at 1600 Buck O'Neill Way, Kansas City, Missouri, located just behind the Negro Leagues Baseball Museum.

== Timeline ==
Year(s)	# Yrs.	Team	Level	League	Ballpark
1885, 1887	2	Kansas City Cowboys	Class A	Western League	Association Park
1888, 1890–1891	3	Kansas City Blues	Class A	Western Association	Exposition Park
1892	1	Kansas City Blues	Class A	Western League	Exposition Park
1893	1	Kansas City Blues	Class A	Western Association	Exposition Park
1894	1	Kansas City Cowboys	Class A	Western League	Exposition Park
1895–1899	5	Kansas City Blues	Class A	Western League	Exposition Park
1900	1	Kansas City Blues	Class A	American League	Exposition Park
1901	1	Kansas City Blues	Class A	Western League	Exposition Park

== Year–by–year records ==
Year	Record	Finish	Manager	Playoffs/Notes
1885	17–13	3rd	Ted Sullivan	No playoffs held
1887	58–54	3rd	Joe Ellick / Bradley Patterson	No playoffs held
1888	76–42	1st	Jim Manning	League champions
1890	78–39	1st	Charlie Hackett / Jim Manning	League champions
1891	66–59	2nd	Jim Manning	No playoffs held
1892	33–33	3rd	Jim Manning	League folded July 17
1893	12–8	1st	William Lucas	League folded June 20; League champions
1894	68–58	3rd	Jim Manning	No playoffs held
1895	73–52	3rd	Jim Manning	No playoffs held
1896	69–66	5th	Jim Manning	No playoffs held
1897	40–99	7th	Jim Manning	No playoffs held
1898	88–51	1st	Jim Manning	League champions
1899	53–70	7th	Jim Manning	No playoffs held
1900	69–70	5th	Jim Manning	No playoffs held American League
1901	79–44	1st	George Tebeau	League champions

== Notable alumni ==
- Kid Nichols (1888) Inducted Baseball Hall of Fame, 1949
- Joe McGinnity (1894) Inducted Baseball Hall of Fame, 1946
- Gus Alberts (1892)
- Wyman Andrus (1892)
- Joe Ardner (1888)
- Bill Armour (1893)
- Ollie Beard (1894)
- Charlie Bell (1890)
- Monte Beville (1901)
- Red Bittmann (1890)
- Kitty Brashear (1901)
- Ernie Burch (1885)
- Jim Burns (1890)
- Ike Butler (1901)
- Count Campau (1888)
- Jack Carney (1892)
- Hick Carpenter (1890–1891)
- Scrappy Carroll (1891)
- Ed Cartwright (1888)
- Eli Cates (1900)
- Billy Clingman (1900)
- Billy Colgan (1885)
- Jim Conway (1888, 1890–1891)
- Bill Coughlin (1900)
- Sam Crane (1887)
- Bert Cunningham (1893)
- Jim Curtiss (1888)
- Pete Daniels (1894)
- George Darby (1894)
- Dan Daub (1900)
- Harry Decker (1885)
- Jim Donahue (1890)
- Tim Donahue (1894)
- Harry Dooms (1887)
- Conny Doyle (1885)
- Bill Dugan (1885)
- Ed Dugan (1885)
- Sam Dungan (1900)
- Joe Ellick (1885) (1887, MGR)
- Bob Ewing (1901)
- John Farrell (1900)
- Elmer Foster (1891)
- John Ganzel (1900)
- Dale Gear (1900)
- Norwood Gibson (1900–1901)
- Frank Graves (1887)
- Chummy Gray (1900)
- Joe Gunson (1888, 1891)
- Walter Hackett (1885)
- George Haddock (1887)
- Scott Hardesty (1901)
- Bill Hassamaer (1887-1888)
- Charlie Hastings (1894)
- Charlie Hemphill (1900)
- Moxie Hengel (1887)
- Tom Hernon (1894)
- John Hofford (1887)
- George Hogreiver (1891)
- Will Holland (1890)
- Buster Hoover (1890-1891)
- Shorty Howe (1887)
- Charlie Hoover (1887, 1890)
- Jim Hughey (1892)
- Bill Husted (1891)
- Lou Johnson (1891)
- Spud Johnson (1888)
- Bill Joyce (1887)
- Ed Keas (1887)
- John Keefe (1891)
- Fred Ketchum (1901)
- Walt Kinzie (1887)
- Bill Kling (1894)
- Bill Krieg (1888)
- Fred Lake (1892)
- Watty Lee (1900)
- Jim Lillie (1887)
- Billy Klusman (1894)
- Herman Long (1888)
- Dad Lytle (1892)
- Jim Manning (1887–1888), (1890–1900, MGR)
- Tim Manning (1887)
- Tom Mansell (1887)
- George Mappes (1887)
- Hal Mauck (1894)
- Ed Mayer (1892)
- John McCarty (1887, 1890–1891)
- Dan McFarlan (1894)
- Larry McKeon (1887)
- Jack McMahon (1892)
- Frank McManus (1900)
- Mart McQuaid (1892)
- Tom Messitt (1901)
- Dusty Miller (1901)
- Hugh Nicol (1890)
- Sam Nicholl (1894)
- Bill Niles (1894)
- Billy O'Brien (1885)
- Jack O'Brien (1900–1901)
- Tom O'Brien (1885)
- Casey Patten (1900)
- Harley Payne (1891–1892)
- Frank Pears (1890–1891, 1893)
- Chick Pedroes (1893)
- John Pickett (1891)
- Harry Raymond (1887)
- George Rettger (1901)
- Charlie Reynolds (1888)
- Frank Ringo (1887)
- John Roach (1891)
- Rabbit Robinson (1901)
- Germany Schaefer (1900)
- Milt Scott (1887)
- Emmett Seery (1885)
- Mike Shea (1887)
- Mike Smith (1890–1891)
- George Stallings (1894)
- John Sowders (1891)
- Dan Stearns (1890–1891)
- Ace Stewart (1900)
- Fleury Sullivan (1885)
- Ted Sullivan (1885, MGR)
- John Sullivan (1900)
- Park Swartzel (1888, 1890–1891)
- Art Sunday (1892)
- George Tebeau (1901, MGR)
- Billy Taylor (1885)
- Tom Thomas (1900)
- Bill Traffley (1893)
- Fred Underwood (1891)
- George Ulrich (1894)
- Peek-A-Boo Veach (1885)
- Joe Visner (1885)
- Butts Wagner (1900)
- Charlie Weber (1891)
- Jake Weimer (1901)
- Jake Wells (1888)
- Jack Wentz (1894)
- Milt Whitehead (1885)
- Parke Wilson (1900)
- Barney Wolfe (1901)

== See also ==
- Kansas City Blues (baseball) players
- Kansas City Cowboys (minor league) players
- Sports in Kansas City
