= 1921 in baseball =

The following are the baseball events of the year 1921 throughout the world.

== Headline Events of the Year ==
- First radio broadcast of the World Series.
- Babe Ruth breaks Roger Connor's All-Time Home Run record of 138.

== Champions ==
- World Series: New York Giants over New York Yankees (5–3)

== Statistical leaders ==
	American League		National League		Negro National League	
Stat	Player	Total	Player	Total	Player	Total
AVG	Harry Heilmann (DET)	.394	Rogers Hornsby (STL)	.397	Oscar Charleston^{1} (SLG)	.433
HR	Babe Ruth (NYY)	59	George Kelly (NYG)	23	Oscar Charleston^{1} (SLG)	15
RBI	Babe Ruth (NYY)	168	Rogers Hornsby (STL)	126	Oscar Charleston^{1} (SLG)	91
W	Carl Mays (NYY); Urban Shocker (SLB)	27	Wilbur Cooper (PIT); Burleigh Grimes (BRO)	22	Dave Brown (CAG); Bill Drake (SLG)	17
ERA	Red Faber (CWS)	2.48	Bill Doak (STL)	2.59	Bullet Rogan (KCM)	1.72
K	Walter Johnson (WSH)	143	Burleigh Grimes (BRO)	136	Bill Holland (DTS/CAG)	140

^{1} Negro National League Triple Crown batting winner

== Major League baseball final standings ==
=== American League final standings ===
American League
Team	W	L	Pct.	GB	Home	Road
New York Yankees	98	55	.641	—	53‍–‍25	45‍–‍30
Cleveland Indians	94	60	.610	4½	51‍–‍26	43‍–‍34
St. Louis Browns	81	73	.526	17½	43‍–‍34	38‍–‍39
Washington Senators	80	73	.523	18	46‍–‍30	34‍–‍43
Boston Red Sox	75	79	.487	23½	41‍–‍36	34‍–‍43
Detroit Tigers	71	82	.464	27	37‍–‍40	34‍–‍42
Chicago White Sox	62	92	.403	36½	37‍–‍40	25‍–‍52
Philadelphia Athletics	53	100	.346	45	28‍–‍47	25‍–‍53

Locations of teams for the 1915–1922 American League seasons
American League

=== National League final standings ===
National League
Team	W	L	Pct.	GB	Home	Road
New York Giants	94	59	.614	—	53‍–‍26	41‍–‍33
Pittsburgh Pirates	90	63	.588	4	45‍–‍31	45‍–‍32
St. Louis Cardinals	87	66	.569	7	48‍–‍29	39‍–‍37
Boston Braves	79	74	.516	15	42‍–‍32	37‍–‍42
Brooklyn Robins	77	75	.507	16½	41‍–‍37	36‍–‍38
Cincinnati Reds	70	83	.458	24	40‍–‍36	30‍–‍47
Chicago Cubs	64	89	.418	30	32‍–‍44	32‍–‍45
Philadelphia Phillies	51	103	.331	43½	29‍–‍47	22‍–‍56

Locations of teams for the 1920–1931 National League seasons
National League

== Negro Leagues final standings ==
All Negro leagues standings below are per MLB and Seamheads.

=== Negro National League final standings ===
This was the second overall season of the first Negro National League. Chicago repeated as pennant champion.

vs. Negro National League						vs. Major Black teams			
Negro National League	W	L	T	Pct.	GB	W	L	T	Pct.
Chicago American Giants	44	22	2	.662	—	55	28	4	.655
St. Louis Giants	42	32	1	.567	6	46	34	1	.574
Kansas City Monarchs	53	41	0	.564	5	57	44	0	.564
Indianapolis ABCs	39	37	2	.513	10½	56	56	4	.500
Detroit Stars	31	33	1	.485	12	39	47	1	.454
Columbus Buckeyes	31	39	1	.444	15	43	49	1	.468
Cincinnati Cuban Stars	29	40	1	.421	16	36	43	2	.457
Chicago Giants	10	35	2	.234	23½	14	40	3	.272

Locations of teams for the 1921 Negro National League season
Negro National League
Traveling team: Chicago Giants

=== West (independent teams) final standings ===
A loose confederation of teams were gathered in the West which were not in the Negro National League. These teams did not organize a formal league.

vs. All Teams
Western Independent Clubs	W	L	T	Pct.	GB
Cleveland Tate Stars	20	24	1	.456	1½
Homestead Grays	3	4	1	.438	—
Pittsburgh Keystones	12	18	2	.315	4½

=== East (independent teams) final standings ===
A loose confederation of teams was gathered in the East to compete with the West, however East teams did not organize a formal league as the West did.

vs. All Teams
Eastern Independent Clubs	W	L	T	Pct.	GB
Hilldale Club	27	18	1	.598	—
Atlantic City Bacharach Giants	44	36	3	.548	½
New York Lincoln Giants	12	10	0	.545	3½
Cuban Stars (East)	10	9	0	.526	4
Baltimore Black Sox	4	4	0	.500	4½
Brooklyn Royal Giants	5	8	0	.385	6
All Cubans	4	12	0	.250	8½

=== Playoffs ===
Chicago, the best team of the "West" and Hilldale, the best team of the "East Coast", engaged in a "postseason series" that was played over eleven days in three states (Pennsylvania, Delaware, New Jersey). It was the first postseason series between two Negro league teams in eight years and it would be the first of six held in the 1920s. Hilldale won three games against Chicago winning two while Game 4 ended in a tie.

== Events ==
=== January ===
- January 23 – The Chicago Cubs release first baseman Fred Merkle.
- January 25 – The Chicago Cubs released infielder Buck Herzog. Herzog never again played in the major leagues.

=== March ===
- March 12 – Baseball commissioner Kenesaw Mountain Landis suspends eight members of the Chicago White Sox club for their alleged involvement in the fixing of the 1919 World Series. The group includes outfielder Shoeless Joe Jackson, who batted .375 in the Series. Others players banned are Eddie Cicotte, Happy Felsch, Chick Gandil, Fred McMullin, Swede Risberg, Buck Weaver and Lefty Williams. None of them will ever play in organized baseball again.

=== April ===
- April 13:
  - George Toporcer debuts at second base for the St. Louis Cardinals. Nicknamed "Specs", he is the first-position player to wear eyeglasses on the field.
  - In the season opener, New York Yankees left fielder Babe Ruth goes five-for-five with two doubles, two runs batted in and a run scored to lead the Yankees to an 11–1 victory over the Philadelphia Athletics at the Polo Grounds.
- April 24 – Shortstop Ralph Miller hits a single and draws a walk, and is the only base runner as the Philadelphia Phillies are one-hit by Phil Douglas and the New York Giants.

=== May ===
- May 15 – Goose Goslin makes his MLB debut for the Washington Senators, going 1 for 3. Goslin would go one to become one of the few star players for the franchise and eventually be inducted into the Baseball Hall of Fame.
- May 22 – In their first meeting of the season, the Pittsburgh Pirates defeat the New York Giants 8–6 at the Polo Grounds, to improve their record to 25–6 and to increase their lead over the second-place Giants to 4.5 games. After trailing for most of the game, the Pirates scored twice in the eighth and six times in the ninth.
- May 30 – There are eight doubleheaders on the major league schedule, with all four NL contests resulting in a sweep; the Pittsburgh Pirates sweep the Chicago Cubs at Forbes Field, the New York Giants sweep the Philadelphia Phillies at the Polo Grounds, the St. Louis Cardinals sweep the Cincinnati Reds at Redland Field and the Boston Braves sweep the Brooklyn Dodgers at Braves Field. Meanwhile, in the American League, the Boston Red Sox are swept by the A's in Philadelphia, and the St. Louis Browns and Chicago White Sox split a pair at Comiskey Park, the Cleveland Indians and Detroit Tigers split a pair at Navin Field, and the New York Yankees and Washington Senators split a pair at Griffith Stadium. Highlights of the doubleheaders include a two-hitter by the Senators' George Mogridge and a sixteen-inning marathon between the Braves and Dodgers.

=== June ===
- June 13 – Babe Ruth pitches the first five innings and hit two home runs in an 11–8 victory over the Detroit Tigers.

=== July ===
- July 8 – Tigers right fielder Harry Heilmann hits a 610-foot home run
- July 12 – Babe Ruth hits his 33rd and 34th home run of the season. His 33rd home run gave him 136 career home runs, tying Roger Connor's all-time mark. His 34th home run makes him the all-time home run king, a title he will hold until 1974.

=== August ===
- August 2 – The 8 White Sox players involved in the Black Sox Scandal (Eddie Cicotte, Happy Felsch, Chick Gandil, Shoeless Joe Jackson, Fred McMullin, Swede Risberg, Buck Weaver, and Lefty Williams) are all acquitted by a Chicago jury of conspiring to throw the 1919 World Series.
- August 3 – One day after their acquittal, the eight players involved in the Black Sox scandal are permanently banned from Major League Baseball by commissioner Kenesaw Mountain Landis.
- August 5 – The Pittsburgh Pirates 8–5 victory over the Philadelphia Phillies at Forbes Field is the first Major League game to be broadcast on radio. Harold Arlin calls the game for Pittsburgh station KDKA.
- August 9 – The St. Louis Browns defeat the Washington Senators 8–6 in nineteen innings. Dixie Davis pitches all nineteen innings for St. Louis.
- August 12 – Philadelphia Phillies pitcher George Smith gives up twelve hits and still hurling a shutout as the Phillies beat the Boston Braves 4–0.
- August 19 – Ty Cobb of the Detroit Tigers becomes the fourth player with 3,000 career hits.
- August 27 – With a 3–1 victory at the Polo Grounds, the New York Giants complete a five-game sweep of the visiting Pittsburgh Pirates to move within 2.5 games of first-place Pittsburgh. The Giants outscored the Pirates 27–6 in the series.

=== September ===
- September 9 – The Detroit Tigers and Chicago White Sox combine for thirty-five runs at Comiskey Park. The Tigers collect twenty hits and six walks on their way to scoring fifteen runs. However, the White Sox scored twenty runs on 22 hits, including a home run by Earl Sheely.
- September 16
  - In the first game of a crucial three-game series for first place in the National League, the New York Giants' Fred Toney holds the Pittsburgh Pirates to two hits in the Giants' 5–0 victory.
  - Hall of Famer Goose Goslin makes his major league debut in the Washington Senators' 2–0 loss to the Cleveland Indians.
- September 17 – The New York Giants complete a ten-game winning streak that sees them go from a half-game back of the Pittsburgh Pirates in the National League to first place, 4.5 games up.
- September 20 – With a 4–2 victory over the Detroit Tigers, and a 7–4 loss by the Cleveland Indians at the hands of the Boston Red Sox, the New York Yankees capture first place in the American League, and hold it for the remainder of the season.
- September 25 – The New York Yankees defeat the Cleveland Indians 21–7. Surprisingly, none of the 21 runs scored are driven in by Babe Ruth, who goes on to compile one of the greatest single seasons of batting in Major League baseball history by hitting 59 home runs, driving in 171 runs, scoring 177 runs with 204 hits for a .378 batting average in only 540 At-Bats. His On-base percentage for the season is .510 and his slugging percentage is an astounding .846 mark. Ruth's 59 home runs are more than the other seven American League team home run totals combined.
- September 29 – Future Hall of Fame outfielder Kiki Cuyler makes his major league debut with the Pittsburgh Pirates. He is held hitless in three at-bats by St. Louis Cardinals pitcher Bill Sherdel.

=== October ===
- October 2 – The Philadelphia Athletics lose 11–6 to the Washington Senators for their 100th loss of the season, giving both Philadelphia teams 100 losses for the season.
- October 5 – The New York Yankees defeat the New York Giants 3–0 in the first World Series game in franchise history. The Series is the first to be broadcast on radio. Announcer Thomas Cowan recreated the game over Westinghouse-owned WJZ in Newark, listening to phoned-in reports from the stadium.
- October 6 – The Yankees defeat the Giants in the second game of the World Series by the same score of the first game, 3–0.
- October 7 – After having been outscored 10–0 in the World season, and falling behind 4–0 to the Yankees in game three, the Giants explode for thirteen runs, and defeat the Yankees 13–5.
- October 9 – The New York Giants even the 1921 World Series at two games apiece with a 4–2 victory. Babe Ruth homers in the bottom of the ninth.
- October 10 – Babe Ruth catches the New York Giants' infield off guard as the Yankee slugger bunts his way on to lead off the fourth inning. The strategy works, as Ruth scores the winning run in the Yankees' 3–1 victory.
- October 11 – The New York Giants battle back from 3–0 and 5–3 deficits to beat the Yankees 8–5 in game six of the World Series.
- October 12 – A costly error by second baseman Aaron Ward on a Johnny Rawlings ground ball leads to an unearned run, and is the difference in the Giants' 2–1 victory in game seven of the World Series.
- October 13 – The New York Giants defeat the New York Yankees, 1–0, in Game eight of the World Series to capture their second World Championship, five games to three. For the first time in World Series play, all games were held at one site: the Polo Grounds in New York, with the home team alternating. The Yankees sub-leased the Polo Grounds from the New York Giants from 1913 through 1922.

== Births ==
=== January ===
- January 1:
  - Royce Lint
  - Doris Tetzlaff
- January 3 – Lucella MacLean
- January 7 – Ted Beard
- January 8:
  - Herb Conyers
  - Marv Rickert
  - Johnny Tobin
- January 11 – Al Kvasnak
- January 19 – Mary Louise Lester
- January 21 – Ken Polivka
- January 28 – Julio Moreno

=== February ===
- February 1 – Dave Madison
- February 3 – Red Durrett
- February 8:
  - Hoot Evers
  - Willard Marshall
- February 12 – Don Bollweg
- February 13 – Pete Castiglione
- February 17:
  - Muriel Coben
  - Doyle Lade
- February 20 – Jack Robinson
- February 25 – Andy Pafko

=== March ===
- March 1:
  - Howie Fox
  - Art Frantz
  - Frank Rosso
- March 2 – Dick Starr
- March 3 – Roy Nichols
- March 5 – Elmer Valo
- March 7 – Les Fusselman
- March 10:
  - James Atkins
  - Johnny Blatnik
  - George Elder
- March 13 – Joe Rossi
- March 14 – Bill Kennedy
- March 20 – Bill Peterman
- March 22 – George Crowe
- March 29 – Ferris Fain
- March 30 – Dick Fowler

=== April ===
- April 1 – Red Murff
- April 3 – Dick Conger
- April 5 – Bobby Hogue
- April 7 – Frank Seward
- April 8 – Dee Sanders
- April 9 – Charlie Mead
- April 10 – Chuck Connors
- April 11 – Jim Hearn
- April 21:
  - Vivian Anderson
  - Bob Rinker
- April 23 – Warren Spahn
- April 26 – Gene Lambert
- April 27 – Mary Reynolds

=== May ===
- May 4 – Larry Drake
- May 6:
  - Bob Chesnes
  - Dick Wakefield
- May 18 – John Fick
- May 19 – John Carden
- May 20:
  - Hal Newhouser
  - Earl Rapp
- May 23 – Bill Drescher
- May 24 – Clancy Smyres

=== June ===
- June 7 – Bill McCahan
- June 9 – Ray Shore
- June 10 – Al Verdel
- June 13 – Nancy Warren
- June 17 – Dave Pope
- June 19 – Clara Cook
- June 23 – Ed Redys
- June 26 – Howie Pollet
- June 27:
  - Hank Behrman
  - Lou Kretlow
- June 28 – Steve Filipowicz
- June 30:
  - Jack Albright
  - Joe Stephenson

=== July ===
- July 5:
  - Al Kozar
  - Guillermo Vento
- July 7 – Johnny Van Cuyk
- July 11 – Hal Gregg
- July 13 – Harry Dorish
- July 17 – Tex Hoyle
- July 22:
  - Al LaMacchia
  - Jim Rivera
- July 24 – Clint Conatser
- July 25:
  - Marv Rackley
  - Sandy Ullrich
- July 26 – Tom Saffell
- July 28 – Ben Steiner
- July 29 – Jim LaMarque

=== August ===
- August 1 – Ray Hamrick
- August 3 – Joe Lafata
- August 5:
  - Anita Foss
  - Ebba St. Claire
- August 12 – Lefty Wallace
- August 18 – Alice DeCambra
- August 21 – Lou Knerr
- August 23 – Dale Mitchell
- August 25 – Al Jurisich
- August 27 – Nick Picciuto
- August 28:
  - Cliff Aberson
  - Bill Bradford
- August 31 – Chub Feeney

=== September ===
- September 1 – Joe Erautt
- September 2 – Josephine Lenard
- September 5 – Vince Shupe
- September 6 – Jack Phillips
- September 19 – Clara Chiano
- September 21 – John McHale
- September 24:
  - Charlene Pryer
  - Clyde Vollmer
- September 26:
  - John H. Johnson
  - Clarence Maddern
- September 30 – Eddie McGah

=== October ===
- October 2 – Ralph Weigel
- October 7 – Red Adams
- October 7 – Charlie Fox
- October 7 – Hank Presswood
- October 7 – Al Sima
- October 10 – Hank Riebe
- October 16 – Matt Batts
- October 17 – Ken Brondell
- October 30 – Ted Abernathy
- October 30 – Chet Kehn

=== November ===
- November 3 – Wally Flager
- November 5 – Mike Goliat
- November 18 – Les Layton
- November 19 – Roy Campanella
- November 20 – Neill Sheridan
- November 21 – Janet Anderson
- November 26:
  - Jodie Beeler
  - Mickey McGowan

=== December ===
- December 1 – Bob Savage
- December 5 – Dave Ferriss
- December 9 – Chuck Kress
- December 12 – Bill Howerton
- December 14 – Bobby Adams
- December 23 – Marge Callaghan
- December 27 – Lucille Colacito
- December 28 – Nelson Burbrink

== Deaths ==
=== January–February ===
- January 1 – George Winkleman
- January 24 – Laurie Reis
- February 11 – John Cullen
- February 13 – Barney McLaughlin
- February 14 – Jumbo Davis, 59, third baseman for seven seasons from 1884 to 1891.

=== March–April ===
- March 10 – Pete Harrison, 36, English-born umpire who worked in the National League from 1916 to 1920.
- March 21 – Tom Vickery
- March 24 – Larry McLean
- March 25 – Harry Arndt
- March 30 – Frank Bancroft, 74, a manager who won the 1884 championship with Providence Grays, also managed six other teams; introduced baseball to Cuba in 1879, and was Reds executive for 30 years.
- March 31 – John Fitzgerald, 50, pitcher for the 1891 Boston Reds.
- April 3:
  - Pop Corkhill
  - George Bechtel, 72, outfielder/pitcher for the 1876 Louisville Grays, one of the inaugural franchises in the National League; previously played for five years in the NL's predecessor, the National Association.
- April 9 – Kid Butler
- April 21 – Edmund C. Converse, 71, industrialist, financier and chief shareholder in 1880s Pittsburgh Alleghenys who served as club president in 1883 and 1884.
- April 21 – Tom O'Brien, 60, utility who played in each position except shortstop, while batting a .231 average for five different teams between 1882 and 1890.
- April 27 – Hal Mauck

=== May–June ===
- May 10 – Pete Harrison, 36, National League umpire from 1916 to 1920
- May 14 – John Farrell
- May 26 – Gil Hatfield
- June 5 – George Rettger
- June 10 – Julie Freeman
- June 15 – Robert Foster
- June 24 – Charlie Hall
- June 27 – Hugh Nicol, 63, Scottish right fielder who set 19th-century record for steals with 138 for 1887 Cincinnati team.

=== July–August ===
- July 1 – Amos Booth
- July 16 – Arthur Irwin, 63, Canadian shortstop for six teams who managed Boston to the 1891 American Association pennant; later a scout and minor league manager.
- July 21 – Tom McLaughlin
- July 22 – Jack Robinson
- July 24 – Bill Dugan
- August 24 – Emil Gross, 63, catcher for five seasons from 1879 to 1884.
- August 26 – Henry Oberbeck

=== September–October ===
- September 3 – Jim Clinton, 71, outfielder for 10 seasons; 1872–1876, 1882–1886.
- October 2 – Ed Carfrey
- October 20 – Jack Hardy
- October 24 – Jimmy Barrett
- October 27 – Bill Kuehne, 63, German third baseman for the Columbus Buckeyes, Pittsburgh Alleghenys & Burghers, Columbus Solons, Louisville Colonels, St. Louis Browns, and Cincinnati Reds during the 19th century.

=== November–December ===
- November 4 – Levi Meyerle, 76, an infielder who won National Association batting titles in 1871 and 1874, later playing in the first major league game.
- December 9 – Charlie Morton, 67, player, manager, and later a minor league president.
- December 15 – Joe Weber
- December 22 – Socks Seybold
