= Memphis Reds (Southern League) =

- 1885; Memphis, Tennessee

Minor league affiliations
- Class: Unclassified
- League: Southern League

Major league affiliations
- Team: Unaffiliated

Minor league titles
- Pennants (0): None

Team data
- Name: Memphis Reds
- Ballpark: Olympic Park

The Memphis Reds were a Minor League Baseball team that played in the Southern League in 1885. They were located in Memphis, Tennessee, and played their home games at Olympic Park. In 1877, a different team also called the Memphis Reds played in the League Alliance.

The Reds played their first game on April 15, losing to the Birmingham Coal Barons, 8–3, on the road. They ended the season in fifth place at 38–54 (.413).

In 1886, the city was represented in the Southern League by the Memphis Grays.

== Season-by-season results ==
Season	Regular-season				Postseason			Ref.
Season	Record	Win %	Finish	GB	Record	Win %	Result	Ref.
1885	38–54	.413	5th	25	—	—	—	

== Notable players ==
Twenty-eight Reds also played in at least one game in Major League Baseball during their careers. These players were:

- Tug Arundel
- Frank Bell
- Bob Black
- Tommy Bond
- Jack Brennan
- Scrappy Carroll
- Billy Colgan
- Clarence Cross
- Doug Crothers
- Billy Crowell
- Conny Doyle
- Harry East
- Bill Geiss
- Bernie Graham
- Bill Hart
- Ducky Hemp
- Mortimer Hogan
- Tom Lee
- Frank McLaughlin
- Trick McSorley
- Billy O'Brien
- Tom O'Brien
- Billy Palmer
- Dick Phelan
- John Richmond
- Ted Sullivan
- Lou Sylvester
- Perry Werden
