= List of Major League Baseball player-managers =

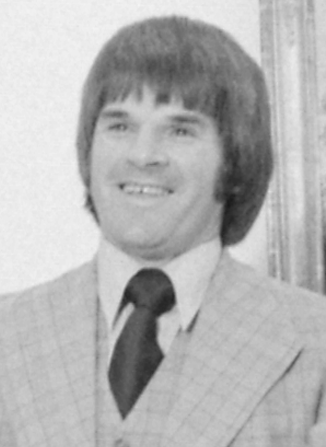
Pete Rose is the most recent player-manager in Major League Baseball, having last done so from 1984 to 1986

Major League Baseball (MLB) is the highest level of play in North American professional baseball. Founded in 1869, it is composed of 30 teams. Each team in the league has a manager, who is responsible for team strategy and leadership on and off the field. Assisted by various coaches, the manager sets the line-up and starting pitcher before each game, and makes substitutions throughout the game. In early baseball history, it was not uncommon for players to serve as player-managers; that is, they managed the team while still being signed to play for the club. In the history of MLB, there have been 221 player-managers, 59 of whom are in the National Baseball Hall of Fame.

The dual role of player-manager was formerly a common practice, dating back to John Clapp, who performed the task for the Middletown Mansfields in 1872. One reason for this is that by hiring a player as a manager, the team could save money by paying only one salary. Also, popular players were named player-managers in an effort to boost game attendance. Babe Ruth left the New York Yankees when they refused to allow him to become player-manager. Five of the eight National League (NL) managers in 1934 were also players. Connie Mack, John McGraw, and Joe Torre, among the all-time leaders in managerial wins, made their managerial debuts as player-managers. At least one man served as a player-manager in every major league season from Clapp's debut through 1955.

Today, player-managers have become rare in baseball. Pete Rose is the most recent player-manager, serving from 1984 through 1986 with the Cincinnati Reds. Whereas some player-managers, such as Lou Boudreau, were full-time players as player-managers, by the time Rose became player-manager, he was a part-time player. Rose was trying to prolong his career to break the all-time hit record set by Ty Cobb, and Reds owner Marge Schott used this as a marketing ploy. Rose removed himself from the 40-man roster after the 1986 season to make room for Pat Pacillo, unofficially retiring as a player, but remained as the Reds manager until he was banned from baseball following the release of the Dowd Report in 1989.

One criticism of the practice holds that the manager has enough to be preoccupied with during a game without playing. With specialized bullpens, extensive scouting reports, and increased media scrutiny, the job of a manager has become more complex. A player-manager needs to decide how much playing time to give himself. Don Kessinger, player-manager of the Chicago White Sox in 1979, believes he did not play himself enough. Additionally, Bill Terry felt he became isolated from his team when he became a player-manager.

However, teams continue to consider hiring player-managers. The Toronto Blue Jays considered hiring Paul Molitor as a player-manager in 1997. When approached with the idea in 2000, Barry Larkin reported that he found it "interesting", though general manager (GM) Jim Bowden rejected the idea. In the 2011–12 offseason, the White Sox considered hiring incumbent first baseman Paul Konerko to serve as manager. White Sox GM Kenny Williams said that he believes MLB will again have a player-manager.

== List ==
Cap Anson was a player-manager for 23 seasons.

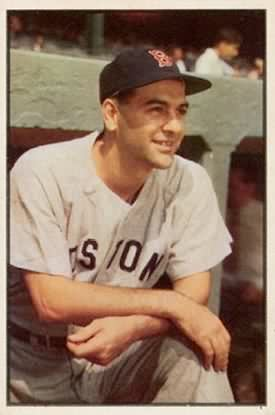
Lou Boudreau won the Most Valuable Player Award while a player-manager in 1948.

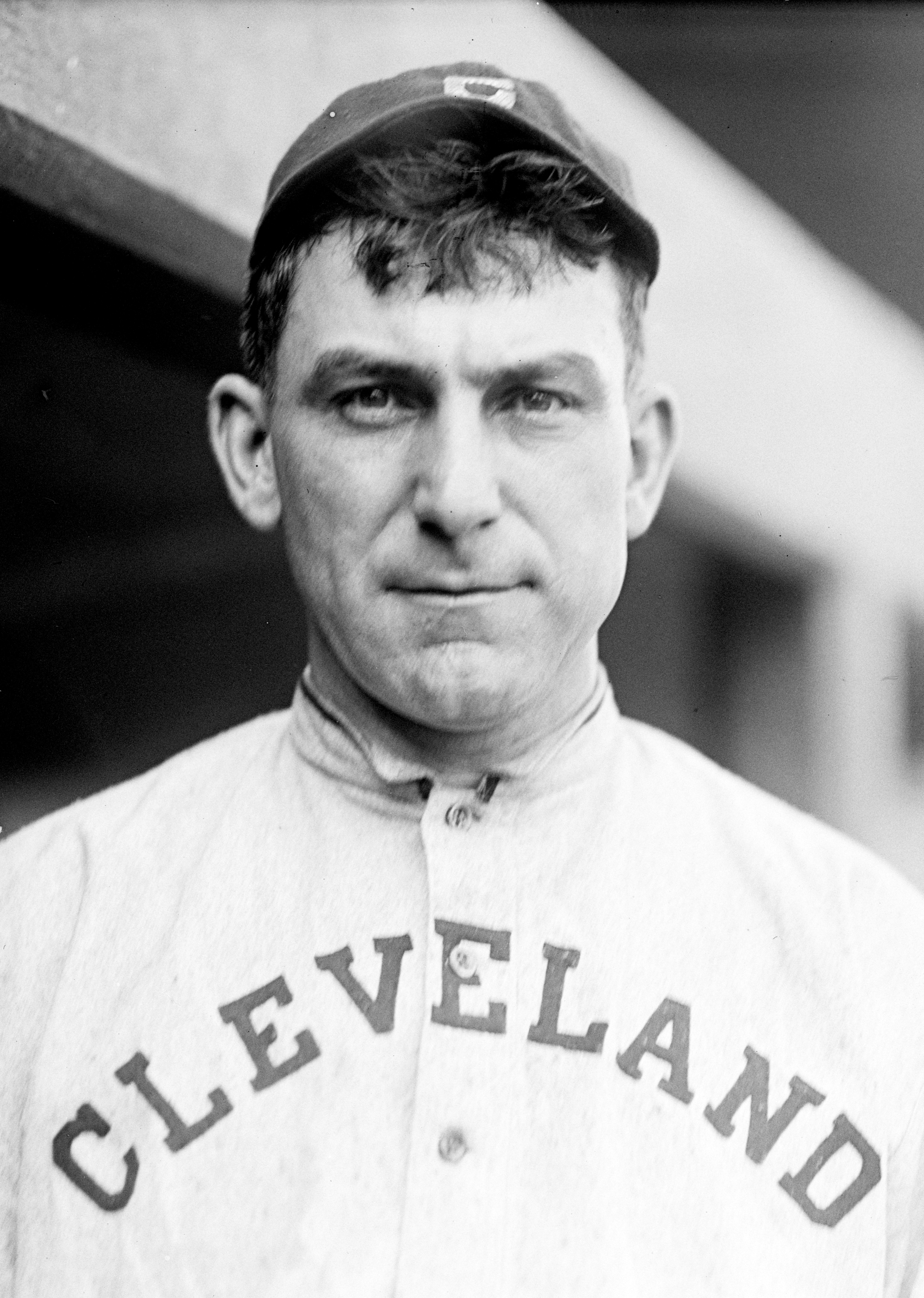
The then-Cleveland Bluebirds were renamed the "Naps" in honor of player-manager Nap Lajoie.

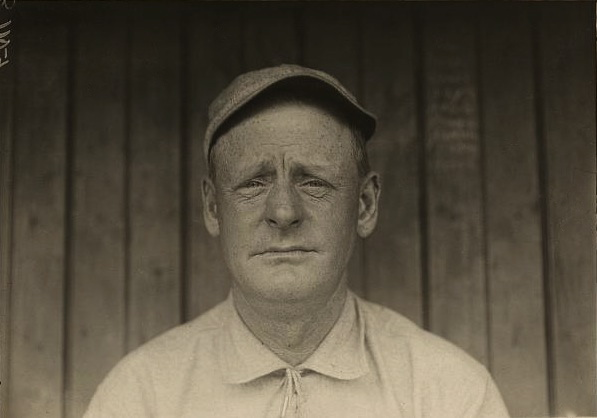
Fred Lake retired as a player in 1898, but inserted himself into three games in 1910.

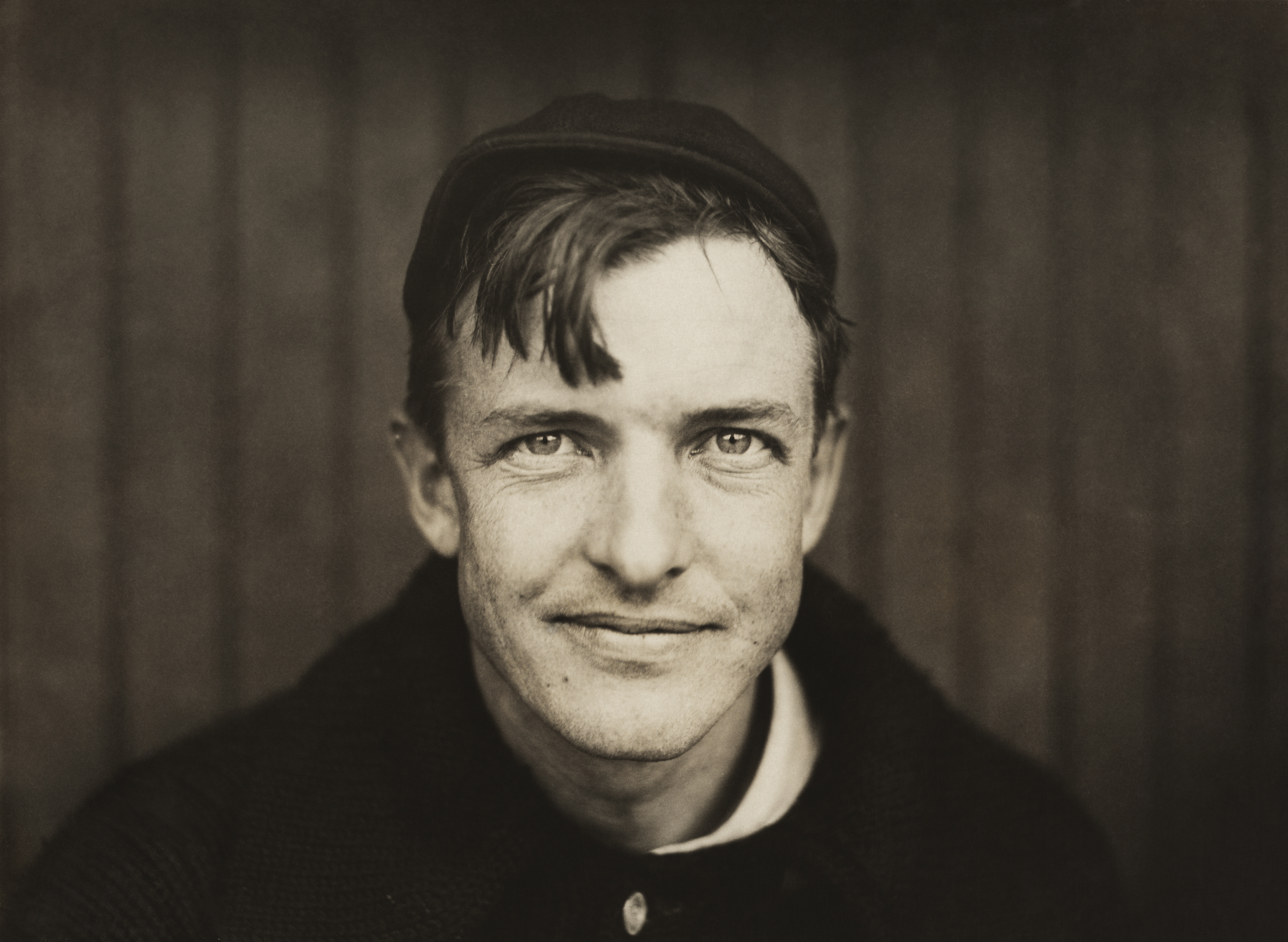
Christy Mathewson played one season with the Cincinnati Reds as a player-manager, then remained as their manager.

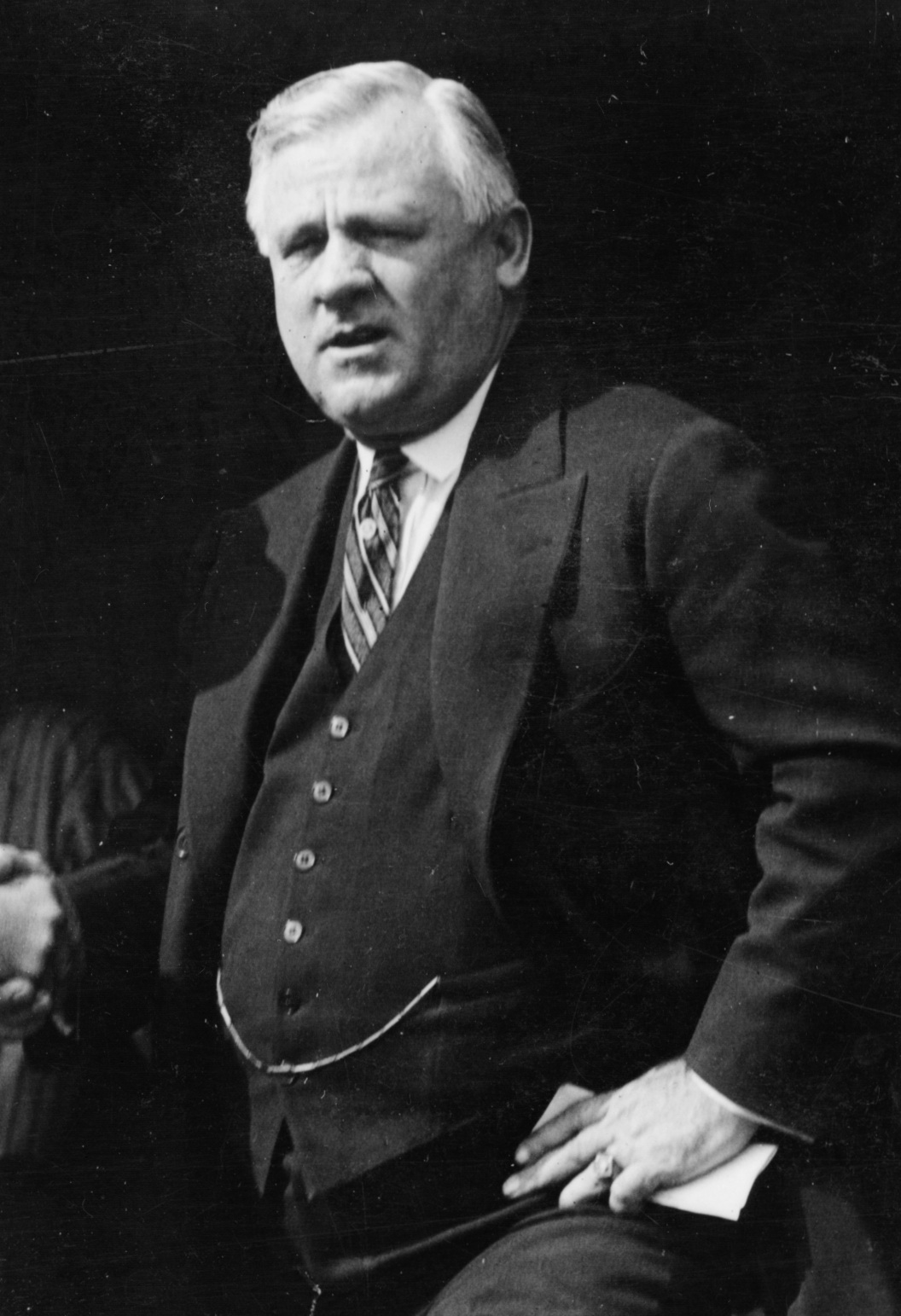
John McGraw retired as a player in 1906, but managed the New York Giants until 1932.

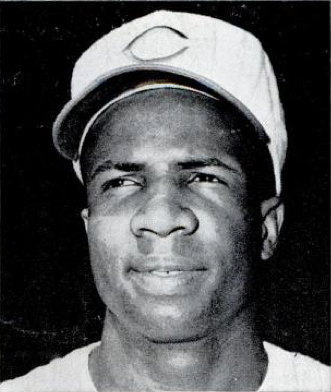
Frank Robinson became the first African-American manager in MLB history when he was named player-manager of the Cleveland Indians in 1975.

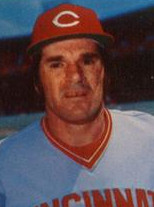
Pete Rose became the all-time MLB hit leader while serving as the Cincinnati Reds' player-manager.

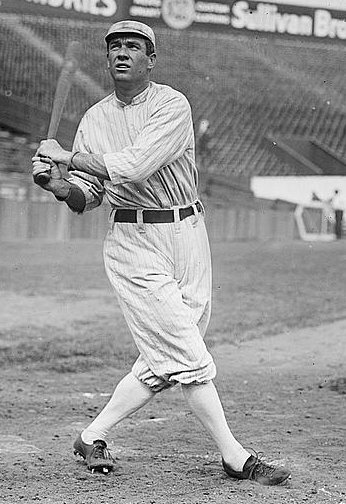
Tris Speaker won the 1920 World Series as player-manager of the Cleveland Indians.

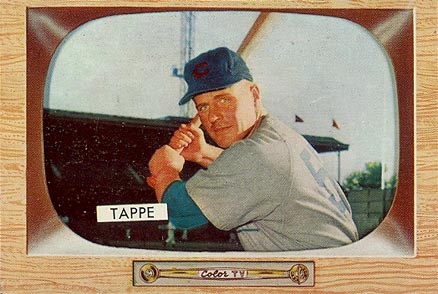
El Tappe, a member of the Chicago Cubs' College of Coaches, played for the Cubs while managing.

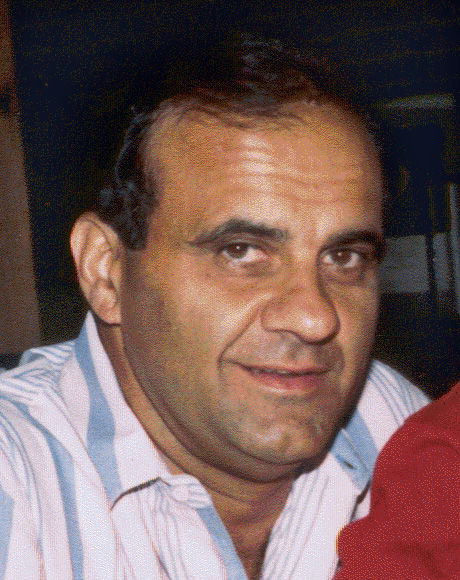
Joe Torre began his managing career as a player-manager for the New York Mets.

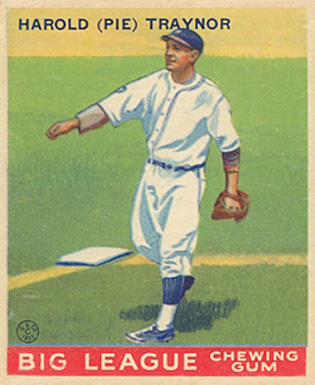
Pie Traynor was an All-Star while a player-manager in 1934.

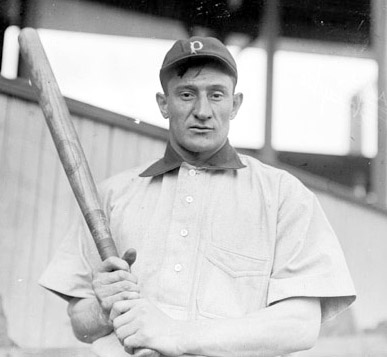
Honus Wagner served as player-manager of the Pittsburgh Pirates in his final season as a player.

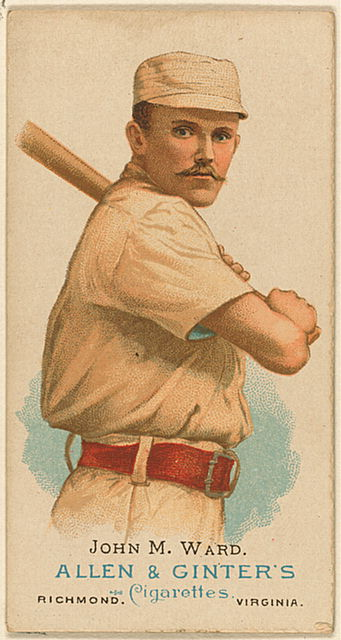
John Montgomery Ward threw a perfect game on June 12, 1880, then became a player-manager for the last 32 games of the 1880 season.

Key
†	Member of the Baseball Hall of Fame
Year(s)	Season(s) as a player-manager
Position	Primary position while a player-manager

MLB player-managers
Player-manager	Team(s)	Year(s)	Position
Bob Addy	Philadelphia White Stockings; Cincinnati Reds	1875; 1877	Outfielder
Bob Allen	Philadelphia Phillies; Cincinnati Reds	1890; 1900	Shortstop
Cap Anson^{†}	Philadelphia Athletics; Chicago Cubs	1875; 1876–1897	First baseman
Jimmy Austin	St. Louis Browns	1913, 1918, 1923	Third baseman
Dave Bancroft^{†}	Boston Braves	1924–1927	Shortstop
Sam Barkley	Kansas City Cowboys	1888	Second baseman
Billy Barnie	Baltimore Orioles	1883, 1886	Catcher
Jack Barry	Boston Red Sox	1917	Second baseman
Joe Battin	Chicago Browns/Pittsburgh Stogies; Pittsburgh Alleghenies	1883–1884; 1884	Third baseman
Hank Bauer	Kansas City Athletics	1961	Outfielder
Joe Birmingham	Cleveland Naps	1912–1914	Outfielder
Lena Blackburne	Chicago White Sox	1929	Pitcher
Walter Blair	Buffalo Blues	1915	Catcher
Tommy Bond	Worcester Ruby Legs	1882	Outfielder
Jim Bottomley^{†}	St. Louis Browns	1937	First baseman
Lou Boudreau^{†}	Cleveland Indians; Boston Red Sox	1942–1950; 1952	Shortstop
Frank Bowerman	Boston Doves	1909	Catcher
Bill Bradley	Cleveland Naps; Brooklyn Tip-Tops	1905; 1914	Third baseman
Roger Bresnahan^{†}	St. Louis Cardinals; Chicago Cubs	1909–1912; 1915	Catcher
Mordecai Brown^{†}	St. Louis Terriers	1914	Pitcher
Tom Brown	Washington Senators	1897–1898	Outfielder
Charlie Buffinton	Philadelphia Athletics	1890	Pitcher
Jack Burdock	Boston Beaneaters	1883	Second baseman
Jimmy Burke	St. Louis Cardinals	1905	Third baseman
Tom Burns	Pittsburgh Pirates	1892	Third baseman
Donie Bush	Washington Senators	1923	Shortstop
Nixey Callahan	Chicago White Sox	1903–1904, 1912–1913	Pitcher
Count Campau	St. Louis Browns	1890	Outfielder
Bill Carrigan	Boston Red Sox	1913–1916	Catcher
Bob Caruthers	St. Louis Browns	1892	Outfielder
Phil Cavarretta	Chicago Cubs	1951–1953	First baseman
Frank Chance^{†}	Chicago Cubs; New York Yankees	1905–1912; 1913–1914	First baseman
Ben Chapman	Philadelphia Phillies	1945–1946	Outfielder
Jack Chapman	Louisville Grays	1876	Outfielder
Hal Chase	New York Highlanders	1910–1911	First baseman
John Clapp	Middletown Mansfields; Indianapolis Blues; Buffalo Bisons; Cincinnati Reds; Cleveland Blues; New York Gothams	1872; 1878; 1879; 1880; 1881; 1883	Catcher
Fred Clarke^{†}	Louisville Colonels; Pittsburgh Pirates	1897–1899; 1900–1911, 1913–1915	Outfielder
Jack Clements	Philadelphia Phillies	1890	Catcher
Ty Cobb^{†}	Detroit Tigers	1921–1926	Outfielder
Mickey Cochrane^{†}	Detroit Tigers	1934–1937	Catcher
Eddie Collins^{†}	Chicago White Sox	1924–1926	Second baseman
Jimmy Collins^{†}	Boston Americans	1901–1906	Third baseman
Charles Comiskey^{†}	St. Louis Browns; Chicago Pirates; Cincinnati Reds	1883–1889, 1891; 1890; 1892–1894	First baseman
Roger Connor^{†}	St. Louis Browns	1896	First baseman
Sam Crane	Buffalo Bisons; Cincinnati Outlaw Reds	1880; 1884	Second baseman
Gavvy Cravath	Philadelphia Phillies	1919–1920	Outfielder
George Creamer	Pittsburgh Alleghenys	1884	Second baseman
Joe Cronin^{†}	Washington Senators; Boston Red Sox	1933–1934; 1935–1947	Shortstop
Jack Crooks	St. Louis Browns	1892	Second baseman
Lave Cross	Cleveland Spiders	1899	Third baseman
Ned Cuthbert	St. Louis Browns	1882	Outfielder
Bill Dahlen	Brooklyn Superbas	1910–1911	Shortstop
George Davis^{†}	New York Giants	1895, 1900–1901	Shortstop
Harry Davis	Cleveland Naps	1912	First baseman
Bill Dickey^{†}	New York Yankees	1946	Catcher
Bill Donovan	New York Yankees	1915–1916	Pitcher
Patsy Donovan	Pittsburgh Pirates; St. Louis Cardinals; Washington Senators; Brooklyn Superbas	1897, 1899; 1901–1903; 1904; 1906–1907	Outfielder
Red Dooin	Philadelphia Phillies	1910–1914	Catcher
Mike Dorgan	Syracuse Stars; Providence Grays; Worcester Ruby Legs	1879; 1880; 1881	Outfielder
Tommy Dowd	St. Louis Browns	1896–1897	Outfielder
Jack Doyle	New York Giants; Washington Senators	1895; 1898	First baseman
Hugh Duffy^{†}	Milwaukee Brewers; Philadelphia Phillies	1901; 1904–1906	Outfielder
Fred Dunlap	Cleveland Blues; St. Louis Maroons; Pittsburgh Alleghenys	1882; 1884–1885; 1889	Second baseman
Leo Durocher^{†}	Brooklyn Dodgers	1939–1941, 1943, 1945	Shortstop
Jimmy Dykes	Chicago White Sox	1934–1939	Third baseman
Kid Elberfeld	New York Highlanders	1908	Shortstop
Joe Ellick	Chicago Browns/Pittsburgh Stogies	1884	Shortstop
Dude Esterbrook	Louisville Colonels	1889	Third baseman
Johnny Evers^{†}	Chicago Cubs	1913	Second baseman
Buck Ewing^{†}	New York Giants; Cincinnati Reds	1890; 1895–1897	Catcher
Jack Farrell	Providence Grays	1881	Second baseman
Bob Ferguson	Hartford Dark Blues; Chicago White Stockings; Troy Trojans; Philadelphia Quakers; Pittsburgh Alleghenys; New York Metropolitans	1876–1877; 1878; 1879–1882; 1883; 1884; 1886–1887	Second baseman
Silver Flint	Chicago White Stockings	1879	Catcher
Jim Fogarty	Philadelphia Athletics	1890	Outfielder
Lew Fonseca	Chicago White Sox	1932–1933	First baseman
Dave Foutz	Brooklyn Grooms	1893–1896	Outfielder
Frankie Frisch^{†}	St. Louis Cardinals	1933–1937	Second baseman
Pud Galvin^{†}	Pittsburgh Alleghenys	1885	Pitcher
John Ganzel	Cincinnati Reds	1908	First baseman
Joe Gerhardt	Louisville Eclipse; St. Louis Browns	1883; 1890	Second baseman
Jack Glasscock	Indianapolis Hoosiers; St. Louis Browns	1889; 1892	Shortstop
George Gore	St. Louis Cardinals	1892	Outfielder
Charlie Gould	Cincinnati Reds	1876	First baseman
Mike Griffin	Brooklyn Bridegrooms	1898	Outfielder
Sandy Griffin	Washington Statesmen	1891	Outfielder
Clark Griffith^{†}	Chicago White Stockings; New York Highlanders; Cincinnati Reds; Washington Senators	1901–1902; 1903–1907; 1909; 1912–1914	Pitcher
Charlie Grimm	Chicago Cubs	1932–1936	First baseman
Heinie Groh	Cincinnati Reds	1918	Third baseman
Bill Hallman	St. Louis Browns	1897	Second baseman
Ned Hanlon^{†}	Pittsburgh Alleghenys; Pittsburgh Burghers; Pittsburgh Pirates; Baltimore Orioles	1889; 1890; 1891; 1892	Outfielder
Bucky Harris^{†}	Washington Senators; Detroit Tigers	1924–1928; 1929, 1931	Second baseman
Gabby Hartnett^{†}	Chicago Cubs	1938–1940	Catcher
Guy Hecker	Pittsburgh Alleghenys	1890	First baseman
Solly Hemus	St. Louis Cardinals	1959	Second baseman
Billy Herman^{†}	Pittsburgh Pirates	1947	Second baseman
Buck Herzog	Cincinnati Reds	1914–1916	Shortstop
Bill Holbert	Syracuse Stars	1879	Catcher
Tommy Holmes	Boston Braves	1951	Outfielder
Rogers Hornsby^{†}	St. Louis Cardinals; New York Giants; Boston Braves; Chicago Cubs; St. Louis Browns	1925–1926; 1927; 1928; 1930–1932; 1933–1937	Second baseman
Miller Huggins^{†}	St. Louis Cardinals	1913–1916	Second baseman
Fred Hutchinson	Detroit Tigers	1952–1953	Pitcher
Arthur Irwin	Washington Nationals; Boston Reds; Philadelphia Phillies	1889; 1891; 1894	Shortstop
Hughie Jennings^{†}	Detroit Tigers	1907, 1909, 1912, 1918	First baseman
Fielder Jones	Chicago White Sox; St. Louis Terriers	1904–1908; 1914–1915	Outfielder
Eddie Joost	Philadelphia Athletics	1954	Shortstop
Bill Joyce	New York Giants	1896–1898	Third baseman
Joe Kelley^{†}	Cincinnati Reds; Boston Doves	1902–1905; 1908	Outfielder
King Kelly^{†}	Boston Beaneaters; Boston Reds; Cincinnati Kelly's Killers	1887; 1890; 1891	Outfielder
John Kerins	Louisville Colonels; St. Louis Browns	1888; 1890	First baseman
Don Kessinger	Chicago White Sox	1979	Shortstop
Bill Killefer	Chicago Cubs	1921	Catcher
Malachi Kittridge	Washington Senators	1904	Catcher
Johnny Kling	Boston Braves	1912	Catcher
Otto Knabe	Baltimore Terrapins	1914–1915	Second baseman
Lon Knight	Philadelphia Athletics	1883–1884	Outfielder
Nap Lajoie^{†}	Cleveland Naps	1905–1909	Second baseman
Fred Lake	Boston Doves	1910	Catcher
Henry Larkin	Cleveland Infants	1890	First baseman
Arlie Latham	St. Louis Browns	1896	Third baseman
Juice Latham	New Haven Elm Citys; Philadelphia Athletics	1875; 1882	First baseman
Harry Lord	Buffalo Blues	1915	Third baseman
Bobby Lowe	Detroit Tigers	1904	Second baseman
Harry Lumley	Brooklyn Superbas	1909	Outfielder
Ted Lyons^{†}	Chicago White Sox	1946	Pitcher
Connie Mack^{†}	Pittsburgh Pirates	1894–1896	Catcher
Denny Mack	Louisville Eclipse	1882	Shortstop
Jimmy Macullar	Syracuse Stars	1879	Shortstop
Lee Magee	Brooklyn Tip-Tops	1915	Second Baseman
Fergy Malone	Philadelphia White Stockings; Chicago White Stockings; Philadelphia Keystones	1873; 1874; 1884	Outfielder
Jack Manning	Cincinnati Reds	1877	Shortstop
Rabbit Maranville^{†}	Chicago Cubs	1925	Shortstop
Marty Marion	St. Louis Browns	1952–1953	Shortstop
Christy Mathewson^{†}	Cincinnati Reds	1916	Pitcher
Jimmy McAleer	Cleveland Blues; St. Louis Browns	1901; 1901–1902	Outfielder
Tommy McCarthy^{†}	St. Louis Browns	1890	Outfielder
Jim McCormick	Cleveland Blues	1879–1880, 1882	Pitcher
Mike McGeary	Philadelphia White Stockings; Providence Grays; Cleveland Blues	1875; 1880; 1881	Second baseman
John McGraw^{†}	Baltimore Orioles (NL); Baltimore Orioles (AL); New York Giants	1899; 1901–1902; 1902–1906	Third baseman
Deacon McGuire	Washington Senators; Boston Americans/Red Sox; Cleveland Naps	1898; 1907–1908; 1910	Catcher
Stuffy McInnis	Philadelphia Phillies	1927	First baseman
Bill McKechnie^{†}	Newark Peppers	1915	Third baseman
Alex McKinnon	St. Louis Maroons	1885	First baseman
Marty McManus	Boston Red Sox	1932–1933	Third baseman
Cal McVey	Cincinnati Reds	1878–1879	Third baseman
Clyde Milan	Washington Senators	1922	Outfielder
John Morrill	Boston Red Caps/Beaneaters; Washington Nationals	1882, 1883–1886, 1887–1888; 1889	First baseman
Charlie Morton	Toledo Blue Stockings; Detroit Wolverines	1884; 1885	Outfielder
Tim Murnane	Boston Reds	1884	First baseman
Henry Myers	Baltimore Orioles	1882	Shortstop
Billy Nash	Philadelphia Phillies	1896	Third baseman
Kid Nichols^{†}	St. Louis Cardinals	1904–1905	Pitcher
Bob O'Farrell	St. Louis Cardinals; Cincinnati Reds	1927; 1934	Catcher
Dan O'Leary	Cincinnati Outlaw Reds	1884	Outfielder
Jim O'Rourke^{†}	Buffalo Bisons; Washington Senators	1881–1884; 1893	Outfielder
Rebel Oakes	Pittsburgh Rebels	1914–1915	Outfielder
Dave Orr	New York Metropolitans	1887	First baseman
Mel Ott^{†}	New York Giants	1942–1947	Outfielder
Roger Peckinpaugh	New York Yankees	1914	Shortstop
Fred Pfeffer	Louisville Colonels	1892	Second baseman
Lip Pike	Hartford Dark Blues; Cincinnati Reds	1874; 1877	Outfielder
Matthew Porter	Kansas City Cowboys	1884	Outfielder
Blondie Purcell	Philadelphia Quakers	1883	Outfielder
Joe Quinn	Cleveland Spiders; St. Louis Browns	1895; 1899	Second baseman
Danny Richardson	Washington Senators	1892	Shortstop
Branch Rickey^{†}	St. Louis Browns	1914	Catcher
Frank Robinson^{†}	Cleveland Indians	1975–1976	Outfielder
Wilbert Robinson^{†}	Baltimore Orioles	1902	Catcher
Jim Rogers	Louisville Colonels	1897	First baseman
Pete Rose	Cincinnati Reds	1984–1986	First baseman
Chief Roseman	St. Louis Browns	1890	Outfielder
Dave Rowe	Kansas City Cowboys (NL); Kansas City Cowboys (AA)	1885; 1888	Outfielder
Jack Rowe	Buffalo Bisons	1890	Shortstop
Ray Schalk^{†}	Chicago White Sox	1927–1928	Catcher
Larry Schlafly	Buffalo Buffeds	1914	Second baseman
Luke Sewell	St. Louis Browns	1942	Catcher
Dan Shannon	Louisville Colonels; Washington Statesmen	1889; 1891	Second baseman
George Sisler^{†}	St. Louis Browns	1924–1926	First baseman
Harry Smith	Boston Doves	1909	Catcher
Heinie Smith	New York Giants	1902	Second baseman
Pop Snyder	Cincinnati Reds; Washington Statesmen	1882–1884; 1891	Catcher
Billy Southworth^{†}	St. Louis Cardinals	1929	Outfielder
Albert Spalding^{†}	Chicago White Stockings	1876–1877	Pitcher
Tris Speaker^{†}	Cleveland Indians	1919–1926	Outfielder
Chick Stahl	Boston Americans	1906	Outfielder
Jake Stahl	Washington Senators; Boston Red Sox	1905–1906; 1912–1913	First baseman
George Stallings	Philadelphia Phillies	1897–1898	Catcher
Eddie Stanky	St. Louis Cardinals	1952–1953	Second baseman
George Stovall	Cleveland Naps; St. Louis Browns; Kansas City Packers	1911; 1912–1913; 1914–1915	First baseman
Harry Stovey	Worcester Ruby Legs; Philadelphia Athletics	1881; 1885	Outfielder
Gabby Street	St. Louis Cardinals	1931	Catcher
Cub Stricker	St. Louis Browns	1892	Second baseman
Billy Sullivan	Chicago White Sox	1909	Catcher
Ted Sullivan	Kansas City Cowboys	1884	Outfielder
El Tappe	Chicago Cubs	1962	Catcher
Patsy Tebeau	Cleveland Infants; Cleveland Spiders; St. Louis Perfectos/Cardinals	1890; 1891–1898; 1900	First baseman
Fred Tenney	Boston Doves/Rustlers; Boston Rustlers	1905–1907; 1911	First baseman
Bill Terry^{†}	New York Giants	1932–1936	First baseman
Joe Tinker^{†}	Chicago Cubs; Cincinnati Reds	1913; 1916	Shortstop
Joe Torre^{†}	New York Mets	1977	First baseman
Pie Traynor^{†}	Pittsburgh Pirates	1934–1937	Third baseman
Bob Unglaub	Boston Red Sox	1907	First baseman
George Van Haltren	Baltimore Orioles	1892	Pitcher
Honus Wagner^{†}	Pittsburgh Pirates	1917	Shortstop
Harry Walker	St. Louis Cardinals	1955	Outfielder
Bobby Wallace^{†}	St. Louis Browns	1911–1912	Shortstop
Bucky Walters	Cincinnati Reds	1948	Pitcher
John Montgomery Ward^{†}	Providence Grays; New York Gothams/Giants; Brooklyn Ward's Wonders; Brooklyn Grooms	1880; 1884, 1893–1894; 1890; 1891–1892	Pitcher
Bill Watkins	Indianapolis Hoosiers	1884	Third baseman
Harry Wheeler	Kansas City Cowboys	1884	Outfielder
Deacon White^{†}	Cincinnati Reds	1879	Catcher
Will White	Cincinnati Red Stockings	1884	Pitcher
Kaiser Wilhelm	Philadelphia Phillies	1921	Pitcher
Jimmie Wilson	Philadelphia Phillies	1934–1938	Catcher
Ivey Wingo	Cincinnati Reds	1916	Catcher
Jimmy Wolf	Louisville Colonels	1889	Outfielder
Harry Wolverton	New York Highlanders	1912	Third baseman
George Wood	Philadelphia Athletics	1891	Outfielder
George Wright^{†}	Providence Grays	1879	Shortstop
Harry Wright^{†}	Boston Red Stockings / Red Caps	1876–1877	Outfielder
Tom York	Providence Grays	1878; 1881	Outfielder
Cy Young^{†}	Boston Red Sox	1907	Pitcher
Chief Zimmer	Philadelphia Phillies	1903	Catcher

== See also ==
- Player-coach#Player-managers in baseball
- List of Major League Baseball managers
