= Barney McLaughlin =

Irish baseball player (1862–1921)

- Infielder
- Born: 1862; Ireland
- Died: February 13, 1921; Lowell, Massachusetts, U.S.
- Batted: Right Threw: Right

MLB debut
- August 2, 1884, for the Kansas City Cowboys

Last MLB appearance
- August 12, 1890, for the Syracuse Stars

MLB statistics
- Batting average: .243
- Home runs: 3
- Runs batted in: 66
- Stats at Baseball Reference

Teams
- Kansas City Cowboys (1884); Philadelphia Quakers (1887); Syracuse Stars (1890)

Bernard McLaughlin (1862 – February 13, 1921) was an Irish born Major League Baseball player. He played three seasons in the majors, spaced at three year intervals, for three teams, in three leagues, at three positions.

McLaughlin made his major league debut in 1884 for the Kansas City Cowboys of the short-lived Union Association. With the Cowboys, he was an outfielder, playing in about half their games—more than any other Cowboys outfielder except Taylor Shafer.

After playing in the minor leagues with Waterbury of the Eastern League in 1886, where he was the team's starting shortstop, McLaughlin returned to the majors in 1887 with the National League's Philadelphia Quakers. With the Quakers, McLaughlin played primarily as a second baseman, splitting time at the position with Charlie Bastian and Charlie Ferguson (who was also one of the Quakers' starting pitchers).

After two more seasons away from the majors, McLaughlin resurfaced in 1890. This time, he was playing shortstop for the Syracuse Stars of the American Association in their only major league season. McLaughlin's double-play partner with the 7th-place Stars was 22-year-old rookie Cupid Childs, who would go on to a fine career. For McLaughlin, however, it was the end of the road.

McLaughlin's brother, Frank McLaughlin, was also a major league player. The two were teammates on the Cowboys, with Frank ending his career as Barney was starting his.

== Sources ==
- Career statistics from Baseball Reference · Baseball Reference (Minors) · Retrosheet · Baseball Almanac
