= James Cudworth =

James Cudworth may refer to:

- James Cudworth (engineer)
- James Cudworth (colonist)
- Jim Cudworth, American baseball player
