= Nin Alexander =

American baseball player (1858–1933)

- Catcher
- Born: November 24, 1858; Pana, Illinois
- Died: December 22, 1933 (aged 75); Pana, Illinois
- Batted: Right Threw: Right

MLB debut
- June 7, 1884, for the Kansas City Cowboys

Last MLB appearance
- September 3, 1884, for the St. Louis Browns

MLB statistics
- Batting average: .130
- Home runs: 0
- Runs scored: 0
- Stats at Baseball Reference

Teams
- Kansas City Cowboys (1884); St. Louis Browns (1884)

William Henry "Nin" Alexander (November 4, 1858 – December 22, 1933) was an American major league baseball catcher, center fielder and shortstop.

== Biography ==
Alexander was born in Pana, Illinois. He played his first professional game on June 7, 1884, with the Kansas City Unions. He played professionally for the Kansas City Unions and the St. Louis Browns. He played his last professional game on September 3, 1884.

He died on December 22, 1933.
