= Dick Blaisdell =

American baseball player (1862–1886)

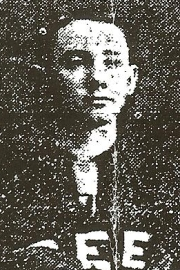
- Pitcher
- Born: June 18, 1862; Bradford, Massachusetts, U.S.
- Died: August 20, 1886 (aged 24); Malden, Massachusetts, U.S.
- Batted: Unknown Threw: Unknown

MLB debut
- July 9, 1884, for the Kansas City Cowboys

Last MLB appearance
- July 14, 1884, for the Kansas City Cowboys

MLB statistics
- Win–loss record: 0–3
- Earned run average: 8.65
- Strikeouts: 8
- Stats at Baseball Reference

Teams
- Kansas City Cowboys (UA) (1884)

Howard Carleton Blaisdell (June 18, 1862 – August 20, 1886) was an American starting pitcher for the Kansas City Cowboys of the Union Association during the 1884 season.

Blaisdell pitched for the Fort Wayne Hoosiers of the Northwestern League (1883) and Lynn of the Massachusetts State Association (1884) before joining the Cowboys. He posted a 0–3 record with an 8.65 ERA in 26 innings of work for Kansas City, who finished 11th with a 16–63 mark. Though he was not successful as a pitcher, Blaisdell hit .313 (5-for-16) with a double and one run, a bright spot for a team which hit for a .199 average.

In 1885, Blaisdell pitched for the Haverhill club of the New England League. A year later he died of tuberculosis in Malden, Massachusetts, at the age of 24.

== See also ==
- 1884 Kansas City Cowboys season
