= Kansas City Cowboys (Union Association) =

1884 Union Association baseball team

The Kansas City Cowboys (also Unions and Kaycees) were a baseball team in the Union Association during its only season, 1884. Referred to as the "Cowboys" mostly by historians, they had no official nickname during their short life and were most frequently referred to by local press of the day as the "Unions" and by the press of other cities as the "Kaycees". They were the first professional baseball team to represent Kansas City as well as the city's first major league team. Their home field was called Athletic Park.

They began play as a replacement for the Altoona Mountain City, which collapsed in May, and played out the remainder of the season. Despite a 16-63 (.203 WL percentage) finish, the franchise was one of only two (the St. Louis club being the other) in the league to make a profit. In contemporary newspaper reports, the team had Altoona's record (6-19) combined with their own and were considered to have finished last in an eight-team league. After the league had collapsed, and Henry Lucas abandoned the Union Association for the National League after they offered a spot for his St. Louis Maroons, the Cowboys and Milwaukee Greys voted to Disband/Dissolve the Union Association. Ted Sullivan and the Unions grouped with the Milwaukee Brewers and other cities and teams to help establish the Western League. The Kansas City Cowboys Had a spot in the league. So did Milwaukee.

== 1884 season ==
=== Season standings ===
Union Association
Team	W	L	Pct.	GB	Home	Road
St. Louis Maroons	94	19	.832	—	49‍–‍6	45‍–‍13
Cincinnati Outlaw Reds	69	36	.657	21	35‍–‍17	34‍–‍19
Baltimore Monumentals	58	47	.552	32	29‍–‍21	29‍–‍26
Boston Reds	58	51	.532	34	34‍–‍22	24‍–‍29
Milwaukee Brewers	8	4	.667	35½	8‍–‍4	0‍–‍0
St. Paul Saints	2	6	.250	39½	0‍–‍0	2‍–‍6
Chicago Browns/Pittsburgh Stogies	41	50	.451	42	21‍–‍19	20‍–‍31
Altoona Mountain Citys	6	19	.240	44	6‍–‍12	0‍–‍7
Wilmington Quicksteps	2	16	.111	44½	1‍–‍6	1‍–‍10
Washington Nationals (UA)	47	65	.420	46½	36‍–‍27	11‍–‍38
Philadelphia Keystones	21	46	.313	50	14‍–‍21	7‍–‍25
Kansas City Cowboys	16	63	.203	61	11‍–‍23	5‍–‍40

=== Record vs. opponents ===
1884 Union Association record Sources:
Team	ALT	BLU	BSU	CUN	COR	KC	MIL	PHK	SLM	SPS	WST	WIL
Altoona	—	1–3	1–1	0–0	0–3	0–0	0–0	1–3	0–8	0–0	3–1	0–0
Baltimore	3–1	—	10–5–1	7–5	4–10	10–2	1–3	10–2	1–14	0–0	11–5	1–0
Boston	1–1	5–10–1	—	4–8–1	5–11	8–4	2–2	8–3	8–8	0–0	12–4	5–0
Chicago/Pittsburgh	0–0	5–7	8–4–1	—	7–8	12–4	0–0	3–5	2–14	0–0	4–8–1	0–0
Cincinnati	3–0	10–4	11–5	8–7	—	9–1	0–0	9–0	4–12	3–0	10–6	2–1
Kansas City	0–0	2–10	4–8	4–12	1–9	—	0–0	0–4	0–11–1	1–1–1	4–8–1	0–0
Milwaukee	0–0	3–1	2–2	0–0	0–0	0–0	—	0–0	0–0	0–0	3–1	0–0
Philadelphia	3–1	2–10	3–8	5–3	0–9	4–0	0–0	—	0–8	0–0	4–7	0–0
St. Louis	8–0	14–1	8–8	14–2	12–4	11–0–1	0–0	8–0	—	2–1	13–3	4–0
St. Paul	0–0	0–0	0–0	0–0	0–3	1–1–1	0–0	0–0	1–2	—	0–0	0–0
Washington	1–3	5–11	4–12	8–4–1	6–10	8–4–1	1–3	7–4	3–13	0–0	—	4–1
Wilmington	0–0	0–1	0–5	0–0	1–2	0–0	0–0	0–0	0–4	0–0	1–4	—

=== Roster ===
1884 Kansas City Cowboys
Roster
Pitchers: Jersey Bakely; Dick Blaisdell; Doug Crothers; Frank Foreman; Ernie Hickman; Bill Hutchison; John Kirby; Catchers: Nin Alexander; Kid Baldwin; Charlie Cady; Al Dwight	Infielders: Charlie Bastian; Charlie Berry; Ed Callahan; Clarence Cross; Jim Cudworth; Jumbo Davis; John Deasley; Jim Donnelly; Joe Ellick; Charlie Fisher; Jack Gorman; Thomas Gorman; Henry Luff; Frank McLaughlin; Billy O'Brien; Henry Oberbeck; Jimmy Say; Lou Say; George Strief; Pat Sullivan; Jerry Sweeney; Jerry Turbidy; Milt Whitehead	Outfielders: Bob Black; Jim Chatterton; Joe Connors; Harry Decker; Bill Dugan; Frank Kreeger; Barney McLaughlin; Matthew Porter; Emmett Seery; Taylor Shafer; Joe Strauss; Ted Sullivan; Peek-A-Boo Veach; Alex Voss; Harry Wheeler; Wills; Willis Wyman	Manager: Matthew Porter; Ted Sullivan; Harry Wheeler

== Player stats ==
=== Batting ===
==== Starters by position ====
Note: Pos = Position; G = Games played; AB = At bats; H = Hits; Avg. = Batting average; HR = Home runs

Pos	Player	G	AB	H	Avg.	HR
C	Kid Baldwin	50	191	37	.194	0
1B	Jerry Sweeney	31	129	34	.264	0
2B	Charlie Berry	29	118	29	.246	1
SS	Clarence Cross	25	93	20	.215	0
3B	Pat Sullivan	31	114	22	.193	0
OF	Taylor Shafer	44	164	28	.171	0
OF	Barney McLaughlin	42	162	37	.228	0
OF	Willis Wyman	30	124	27	.218	0

==== Other batters ====
Note: G = Games played; AB = At bats; H = Hits; Avg. = Batting average; HR = Home runs

Player	G	AB	H	Avg.	HR
Bob Black	38	146	36	.247	1
Frank McLaughlin	32	123	28	.228	1
Jim Cudworth	32	116	17	.147	0
Thomas Gorman	25	106	34	.321	0
Henry Oberbeck	27	90	17	.189	0
Harry Decker	23	75	10	.133	0
Lou Say	17	70	14	.200	1
Nin Alexander	19	65	9	.138	0
Harry Wheeler	14	62	16	.258	0
Joe Strauss	16	60	12	.200	0
George Strief	15	56	6	.107	0
Jerry Turbidy	13	49	11	.224	0
Charlie Bastian	11	46	9	.196	1
Alex Voss	14	45	4	.089	0
Al Dwight	12	43	10	.233	0
John Deasley	13	40	7	.175	0
Charlie Fisher	10	40	8	.200	0
Jack Gorman	8	31	4	.129	0
Jumbo Davis	7	29	6	.207	0
James Donnelly	6	23	3	.130	0
Milt Whitehead	5	22	3	.136	0
Wills	5	21	3	.143	0
Henry Luff	5	19	1	.053	0
Billy O'Brien	4	17	4	.235	0
Jim Chatterton	4	15	2	.133	0
Matthew Porter	3	12	1	.083	0
Joe Connors	3	11	1	.091	0
Ed Callahan	3	11	4	.364	0
Ted Sullivan	3	9	3	.333	0
Joe Ellick	2	8	0	.000	0
Jimmy Say	2	8	2	.250	0
John Kirby	2	7	1	.143	0
Bill Dugan	3	6	0	.000	0
Emmett Seery	1	4	2	.500	0
Charlie Cady	2	3	0	.000	0

=== Pitching ===
==== Starting pitchers ====
Note: G = Games pitched; IP = Innings pitched; W = Wins; L = Losses; ERA = Earned run average; SO = Strikeouts

Player	G	IP	W	L	ERA	SO
Ernie Hickman	17	137.1	4	13	4.52	68
Bob Black	16	123.0	4	9	3.22	93
Peek-A-Boo Veach	12	104.0	3	9	2.42	62
Alex Voss	7	53.0	0	6	4.25	17
Jersey Bakely	5	33.0	2	3	2.45	13
Dick Blaisdell	3	26.0	0	3	8.65	8
Doug Crothers	3	25.0	1	2	1.80	11
Bill Hutchison	2	17.0	1	1	2.65	5
John Kirby	2	11.0	0	1	4.09	1
Harry Wheeler	1	8.0	0	1	1.13	6
Frank Foreman	1	8.0	0	1	5.63	5
Pat Sullivan	1	7.0	0	1	11.57	1
Frank Kreeger	1	7.0	0	1	0.00	3
Jim Chatterton	1	5.0	0	1	3.60	2

==== Other pitchers ====
Note: G = Games pitched; IP = Innings pitched; W = Wins; L = Losses; ERA = Earned run average; SO = Strikeouts

Player	G	IP	W	L	ERA	SO
Barney McLaughlin	7	48.2	1	3	5.36	14
Henry Oberbeck	6	29.2	0	5	5.76	6
Willis Wyman	3	21.0	0	1	6.86	9
Jim Cudworth	2	17.0	0	0	4.24	6
Joe Connors	2	12.0	0	1	4.50	1
Frank McLaughlin	2	10.0	0	0	5.40	3

== References and external links ==
- 1884 Kansas City Cowboys at Baseball Reference
