= Frank Kreeger =

American baseball player

- Outfielder/Pitcher
- Born: Unknown
- Died: July 12, 1899; Shelby County, Illinois
- Batted: Unknown Threw: Unknown

MLB debut
- July 28, 1884, for the Kansas City Cowboys

Last MLB appearance
- July 28, 1884, for the Kansas City Cowboys

MLB statistics
- Batting average: .000
- Home runs: 0
- Runs scored: 0
- Stats at Baseball Reference

Teams
- Kansas City Cowboys (1884)

Frank Kreeger was a 19th-century professional baseball player. He played for the Kansas City Cowboys of the Union Association in 1884.
