= Willis Wyman =

American baseball player (1859–1942)

- Outfielder
- Born: December 19, 1859; Cumberland, Maine
- Died: January 10, 1942 (aged 82); Portland, Maine
- Batted: Unknown Threw: Unknown

MLB debut
- June 10, 1884, for the Kansas City Cowboys

Last MLB appearance
- August 9, 1884, for the Chicago Browns

MLB statistics
- Batting average: .227
- Home runs: 0
- Runs scored: 17
- Stats at Baseball Reference

Teams
- Kansas City Cowboys (1884); Chicago Browns (1884)

Willis C. Wyman (December 19, 1859 – January 10, 1942) was a professional baseball outfielder. He played one season for the Kansas City Cowboys and Chicago Browns in the Union Association in 1884.
