= Matthew Porter =

American baseball player and manager (1858–1906)

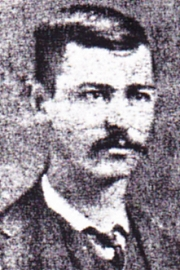
- Center fielder/Manager
- Born: 1858; New York
- Died: September 28, 1906 (aged 48); Pijijiapan, Mexico
- Batted: Unknown Threw: Unknown

MLB debut
- June 27, 1884, for the Kansas City Cowboys

Last MLB appearance
- July 5, 1884, for the Kansas City Cowboys

MLB statistics
- Games played: 3
- At bats: 12
- Batting average: .083
- Stats at Baseball Reference

Teams
- As player: Kansas City Cowboys (1884); As manager: Kansas City Cowboys (1884)

Matthew Sheldon Porter (1858 – September 28, 1906), was an American Major League Baseball player who, for a short time in 1884, managed and played for the Kansas City Cowboys of the Union Association. During his 16 games as manager, his team won three games and lost 13. He inserted himself into the line-up three times, all in center field, and produced one hit, a double, in 12 at bats.

== See also ==
- List of Major League Baseball player–managers
