= Lou Say =

American baseball player (1854–1930)

- Shortstop
- Born: February 4, 1854; Baltimore, Maryland, U.S.
- Died: June 5, 1930 (aged 76); Fallston, Maryland, U.S.
- Batted: Right Threw: Right

MLB debut
- April 14, 1873, for the Baltimore Marylands

Last MLB appearance
- October 19, 1884, for the Kansas City Cowboys

MLB statistics
- Batting average: .232
- Runs batted in: 52
- Home runs: 5
- Stats at Baseball Reference

Teams
- Baltimore Marylands (1873); Baltimore Canaries (1874); Washington Nationals (1875); Cincinnati Stars (1880); Philadelphia Athletics (1882); Baltimore Orioles (1883); Baltimore Monumentals (1884); Kansas City Cowboys (1884)

Louis I. Say (February 4, 1854 – June 5, 1930) was an American professional baseball player who played in seven seasons for the Baltimore Marylands, Baltimore Canaries and Washington Nationals of the National Association, the Cincinnati Reds of the National League, Philadelphia Athletics and Baltimore Orioles of the American Association, the Baltimore Monumentals and the Kansas City Cowboys of the Union Association in the early days of Major League Baseball. He was born in Baltimore, Maryland and died in Fallston, Maryland at the age of 76. He was the brother of Jimmy Say.

Say is the only player in baseball history to record more than 100 errors (102) in a season while playing in fewer than 100 games.
