= Jerry Sweeney =

American baseball player (1857–1891)

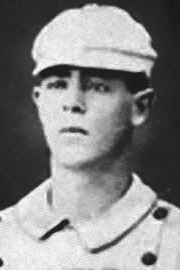
- First baseman
- Born: September 4, 1857; Boston, Massachusetts, U.S.
- Died: August 25, 1891 (aged 33); Boston, Massachusetts, U.S.
- Batted: Unknown Threw: Unknown

MLB debut
- August 22, 1884, for the Kansas City Cowboys

Last MLB appearance
- October 16, 1884, for the Kansas City Cowboys

MLB statistics
- Batting average: .264
- Home runs: 0
- Runs scored: 0
- Stats at Baseball Reference

Teams
- Kansas City Cowboys (1884)

Jeremiah James Sweeney (September 4, 1857 – August 25, 1891) was a 19th-century American professional baseball player. He played for the Kansas City Cowboys of the Union Association in 1884.
