= James Donnelly (baseball) =

American baseball player (1867–1933)

- Third baseman
- Born: January 6, 1867; Boston, Massachusetts, U.S.
- Died: December 31, 1933 (aged 66); Somerville, Massachusetts, U.S.

MLB debut
- July 11, 1884, for the Kansas City Cowboys (UA)

Last MLB appearance
- July 18, 1884, for the Kansas City Cowboys (UA)

MLB statistics
- Batting average: .130
- Home runs: 0
- Runs batted in: 0
- Stats at Baseball Reference

Teams
- Kansas City Cowboys (UA) (1884)

James Henry Donnelly (January 6, 1867 – December 31, 1933) was an American Major League Baseball third baseman for the Union Association's Kansas City Cowboys in 1884. His statistics are often included with those of Jim Donnelly, though the two were separate players.

Donnelly played in the minor leagues with the Minneapolis Millers and for a team in Lynn, Massachusetts, before signing with Kansas City. He played in Cambridge, Massachusetts, in 1885 and 1886, and Medford and Randolph in 1887. From 1891, he managed the semi-pro Cambridge Reds. Off-season, he worked as a bookkeeper in Boston's Clinton Market.

== Sources ==
- Career statistics from Baseball Reference · Baseball Reference (Minors) · Retrosheet · Baseball Almanac
- Statistics at Baseball Almanac
