= Peek-A-Boo Veach =

American baseball player (1862–1937)

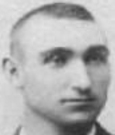
- First baseman / Pitcher
- Born: June 15, 1862; Indianapolis, Indiana, U.S.
- Died: November 12, 1937 (aged 75); Indianapolis, Indiana, U.S.
- Batted: Unknown Threw: Unknown

MLB debut
- August 24, 1884, for the Kansas City Cowboys

Last MLB appearance
- July 25, 1890, for the Pittsburgh Alleghenys

MLB statistics
- Batting average: .215
- Home runs: 3
- Win–loss record: 3–10
- Earned run average: 2.55
- Stats at Baseball Reference

Teams
- Kansas City Cowboys (1884); Louisville Colonels (1887); Cleveland Spiders (1890); Pittsburgh Alleghenys (1890)

William Walter "Peek-A-Boo" Veach (June 15, 1862 – November 12, 1937) was an American Major League Baseball player born in Indianapolis, Indiana. Veach began his career with the ill-fated Union Association in 1884 when he joined the Kansas City Cowboys as a pitcher/outfielder. As a pitcher he started and completed all 12 games in which he pitched, resulting in a 3 win and 9 loss record. Three years later he pitched just one game for the 1887 Louisville Colonels, a complete game loss. This would be the last game he would pitch in the majors until he returned three years later in 1890, this time as a first baseman, splitting time with the Cleveland Spiders and the Pittsburgh Alleghenys. As a batter, he had a career total that included a .215 batting average and three home runs.

Veach acquired his nickname when playing for Kansas City in 1884. It was during this season that his manager Ted Sullivan had set up timing plays to pick runners off first base through the use of signals that Veach would have to wait and look for. Players had caught on to this trick and began calling him Peek-A-Boo because he would be looking around for signals. He was a veteran of the Spanish–American War, so near the end of his life he was admitted into the United States Hospital in Indianapolis. It was here that he died at the age of 75, and is interred at Floral Park Cemetery.
