= Jerry Turbidy =

American baseball player (1852–1920)

- Shortstop
- Born: July 4, 1852; Dudley, Massachusetts, U.S.
- Died: September 5, 1920 (aged 68); Webster, Massachusetts, U.S.
- Batted: Right Threw: Right

MLB debut
- July 27, 1884, for the Kansas City Cowboys

Last MLB appearance
- August 13, 1884, for the Kansas City Cowboys

MLB statistics
- Batting average: .224
- Home runs: 0
- Runs scored: 0
- Stats at Baseball Reference

Teams
- Kansas City Cowboys (1884)

Jeremiah Turbidy (July 4, 1852 – September 5, 1920) was a 19th-century American professional baseball player. He played for the Kansas City Cowboys of the Union Association in 1884.
