= Jack Gorman =

American baseball player (1859–1889)

- Outfielder / Third baseman
- Born: 1859; St. Louis, Missouri, U.S.
- Died: September 9, 1889 (aged 29–30); St. Louis, Missouri, U.S.
- Batted: Unknown Threw: Right

MLB debut
- July 1, 1883, for the St. Louis Browns

Last MLB appearance
- October 14, 1884, for the Pittsburgh Alleghenys

MLB statistics
- Batting average: .129
- Home runs: 0
- Runs scored: 6
- Stats at Baseball Reference

Teams
- St. Louis Browns (1883); Kansas City Cowboys (1884); Pittsburgh Alleghenys (1884)

John F. Gorman (1859 – September 9, 1889), nicknamed "Stooping Jack", was a 19th-century American professional baseball outfielder and third baseman. He continued to play in the minor leagues through 1888.
