= Jimmy Say =

American baseball player (1862–1894)

- Third baseman/Shortstop
- Born: 1862; Baltimore, Maryland, U.S.
- Died: June 23, 1894; Baltimore, Maryland, U.S.
- Batted: Unknown Threw: Unknown

MLB debut
- July 22, 1882, for the Louisville Eclipse

Last MLB appearance
- June 8, 1887, for the Cleveland Blues

MLB statistics
- At bats: 217
- RBI: 12
- Home runs: 1
- Batting average: .263
- Stats at Baseball Reference

Teams
- Louisville Eclipse 1882; Philadelphia Athletics 1882; Wilmington Quicksteps 1884; Kansas City Cowboys 1884; Cleveland Blues 1887

James I. Say (1862 – June 23, 1894) was an American professional baseball player who played in the early days of Major League Baseball. He played all or part of three seasons, 1882, 1884 and 1887, for the Louisville Eclipse, Philadelphia Athletics and Cleveland Blues of the American Association as well as the Wilmington Quicksteps and the Kansas City Cowboys of the Union Association. He was born in Baltimore, Maryland and died there at the age of 31 or 32. He was the brother of Lou Say.
