= Pat Sullivan (third baseman) =

American baseball player (1861–1901)

- Third Baseman
- Born: August 18, 1861; Milwaukee, Wisconsin
- Died: April 14, 1901 (aged 39); Milwaukee, Wisconsin
- Batted: Unknown Threw: Right

MLB debut
- August 30, 1884, for the Kansas City Cowboys

Last MLB appearance
- October 19, 1884, for the Kansas City Cowboys

MLB statistics
- Batting average: .193
- Home runs: 0
- Runs scored: 0
- Stats at Baseball Reference

Teams
- Kansas City Cowboys (1884)

Patrick B. Sullivan (August 18, 1861 – April 14, 1901) was a 19th-century professional baseball player. He played for the Kansas City Cowboys of the Union Association in 1884.
