= Jim Chatterton =

American baseball player (1864–1944)

- First baseman/Outfielder/Pitcher
- Born: October 14, 1864; Brooklyn, New York, U.S.
- Died: December 15, 1944 (aged 80); Tewksbury, Massachusetts, U.S.
- Batted: Unknown Threw: Unknown

MLB debut
- June 7, 1884, for the Kansas City Cowboys

Last MLB appearance
- June 15, 1884, for the Kansas City Cowboys

MLB statistics
- Batting average: .133
- Home runs: 0
- Runs scored: 0
- Stats at Baseball Reference

Teams
- Kansas City Cowboys (1884)

James M. Chatterton (October 14, 1864 – December 15, 1944) was a 19th-century American professional baseball player. He played for the Kansas City Cowboys of the Union Association in 1884.
