= Al Dwight =

American baseball player (1856–1903)

- Catcher
- Born: January 4, 1856; New York, New York
- Died: February 20, 1903 (aged 47); San Francisco, California
- Batted: Unknown Threw: Unknown

MLB debut
- June 19, 1884, for the Kansas City Cowboys

Last MLB appearance
- July 25, 1884, for the Kansas City Cowboys

MLB statistics
- Batting average: .233
- Home runs: 0
- Runs scored: 0
- Stats at Baseball Reference

Teams
- Kansas City Cowboys (1884)

Albert Ward Dwight (1856–1903) was a 19th-century professional baseball player. He played for the Kansas City Cowboys of the Union Association in 1884.
