= Harry Wheeler =

American baseball player (1858–1900)

- Outfielder / Pitcher
- Born: March 3, 1858; Versailles, Indiana, U.S.
- Died: October 9, 1900 (aged 42); Cincinnati, Ohio, U.S.
- Batted: Right Threw: Right

MLB debut
- June 19, 1878, for the Providence Grays

Last MLB appearance
- October 15, 1884, for the Baltimore Monumentals

MLB statistics
- Batting average: .228
- Home runs: 2
- Runs batted in: 32
- Stats at Baseball Reference

Teams
- As player: Providence Grays (1878); Cincinnati Reds (1879); Cincinnati Stars (1880); Cleveland Blues (1880); Cincinnati Red Stockings (1882); Columbus Buckeyes (1883); St. Louis Browns (1884); Kansas City Cowboys (1884); Chicago Browns/Pittsburgh Stogies (1884); Baltimore Monumentals (1884); As manager: Kansas City Cowboys (1884)

Harry Eugene Wheeler (March 3, 1858 – October 9, 1900) was an American 19th century Major League Baseball player from Versailles, Indiana. A well travelled player, he played for eight different teams in three different leagues during his six seasons.

== Career ==
Wheeler began his career with the Providence Grays as a pitcher, where he pitched well. He had an earned run average of 3.48, and won six of the seven games in which he pitched. A good start to his career, but the next two years, he played in only six games for the Cincinnati Reds, Cincinnati Stars and Cleveland Blues. He was formally converted to an outfielder upon his return the majors in 1882 after an absence in 1881, when he joined the American Association Cincinnati Red Stockings. Harry did well with the bat that season, finishing in the top ten in many hitting categories, highest among them were his 11 triples, in which he finished third.

He played for the Columbus Buckeyes the following season. The 1883 season saw his hitting decline, and his fielding, which was already a liability, was getting worse. This was his last full season he played. He ended his career in the failed Union Association in 1884, including a four-game stint as player-manager for the Kansas City Cowboys, losing all of them.

== Post-career ==
Wheeler died at the age of 42, of syphilitic locomotor ataxia. He was interred at Spring Grove Cemetery in Cincinnati.

== See also ==
- List of Major League Baseball player–managers
