= Ernie Hickman =

American baseball player (1856–1891)

- Pitcher
- Born: April 18, 1856; East St. Louis, Illinois
- Died: November 19, 1891 (aged 35); East St. Louis, Illinois
- Batted: Left Threw: Left

MLB debut
- June 7, 1884, for the Kansas City Cowboys

Last MLB appearance
- July 29, 1884, for the Kansas City Cowboys

MLB statistics
- Win–loss record: 4–13
- Strikeouts: 68
- Earned run average: 4.52
- Stats at Baseball Reference

Teams
- Kansas City Cowboys (1884)

Ernest Patrick Hickman (April 18, 1856 – November 19, 1891), was a Major League Baseball pitcher. He played for the Kansas City Cowboys of the Union Association in 1884. His batting and throwing hand, as well as his middle name, and height and weight were all unknown until they were discovered by the webmaster of Baseball Almanac in 2023. With this new information, SABR still has yet to update his biography.

Hickman died in a murder-suicide, first shooting his wife and then shooting himself in the head. He reportedly wanted himself and his wife to die together.

== Death ==
Hickman was known to suffer from severe mental illness and as a result he committed suicide on November 19, 1891, a self-inflicted gunshot wound to the head after shooting his wife. According to his SABR bio, Hickman told her something to the effect of "now we will die together." He was 35 years old.
