= Joe Ellick =

American baseball player (1854–1923)

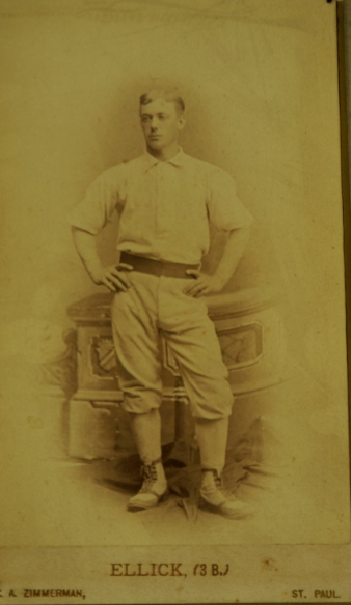
- Outfielder
- Born: April 3, 1854; Cincinnati, Ohio, U.S.
- Died: April 21, 1923 (aged 69); Kansas City, Kansas, U.S.
- Batted: Switch Threw: Right

MLB debut
- May 13, 1875, for the St. Louis Red Stockings

Last MLB appearance
- October 11, 1884, for the Baltimore Monumentals

MLB statistics
- Batting average: .218
- Home runs: 0
- Hits: 106
- Stats at Baseball Reference

Teams
- As player: St. Louis Red Stockings (1875); Milwaukee Grays (1878); Worcester Ruby Legs (1880); Chicago Browns/Pittsburgh Stogies (1884); Kansas City Cowboys (1884); Baltimore Monumentals (1884); As manager: Chicago Browns/Pittsburgh Stogies (1884)

Joseph J. Ellick (April 3, 1854 – April 21, 1923) was a 19th-century American Major League Baseball player. He was also briefly the player-manager of the Chicago Browns/Pittsburgh Stogies of the Union Association, compiling a record of 6–6 with one tie.

== See also ==
- List of Major League Baseball player–managers

== Sources ==
- Career statistics from Baseball Reference · Baseball Reference (Minors) · Retrosheet · Baseball Almanac
