= Taylor Shafer =

American baseball player (1866–1945)

- Second baseman / Outfielder
- Born: July 13, 1866; Philadelphia, Pennsylvania
- Died: October 27, 1945 (aged 79); Glendale, California
- Batted: Left Threw: Unknown

MLB debut
- May 5, 1884, for the Altoona Mountain City

Last MLB appearance
- September 16, 1890, for the Philadelphia Athletics

MLB statistics
- Batting average: .187
- Home runs: 0
- Runs batted in: 21
- Stats at Baseball Reference

Teams
- Altoona Mountain City (1884); Kansas City Cowboys (1884); Baltimore Monumentals (1884); Philadelphia Athletics (1890)

Zachary Taylor Shafer (July 13, 1866 – October 27, 1945) was a Major League Baseball player in the 19th century.

== Career ==
Shafer was born in Philadelphia, Pennsylvania, in 1866. He started his professional baseball career in 1884, when he played for the Altoona Mountain City, Kansas City Cowboys, and Baltimore Monumentals of the Union Association. He appeared in 60 games that season, mostly as an outfielder, and had a batting average of .203.

Shafer spent the next five years in the minor leagues. In 1887, he batted a career-high .364 for Oshkosh of the Northwestern League. In 1890, he made it back to the majors with the American Association's Philadelphia Athletics. He was a second baseman for Philadelphia and batted .172 with 21 RBI in 69 games. That was his last season in professional baseball.

Shafer was 5'7" and weighed 155 pounds. He was the brother of fellow baseball player Orator Shafer.

Taylor Shafer died in Glendale, California, in 1945.
