= Ed Dugan =

American baseball player

- Pitcher
- Born: 1864; Brooklyn, New York, U.S.
- Died: Unknown
- Batted: Unknown Threw: Right

MLB debut
- August 5, 1884, for the Richmond Virginians

Last MLB appearance
- October 15, 1884, for the Richmond Virginians

MLB statistics
- Win–loss record: 5-14
- earned run average: 4.49
- Strikeouts: 60
- Stats at Baseball Reference

Teams
- Richmond Virginians (1884)

Edward John Dugan was a professional baseball pitcher in the American Association for the 1884 Richmond Virginians. His brother, Bill Dugan, also played for the Virginians.
