= Pete Harrison =

English-American baseball umpire

- Born: Peter Alfonsus Harrison; February 1, 1885; England
- Died: March 10, 1921 (aged 36); Saranac Lake, New York, U.S.
- Occupation: Umpire
- Years active: 1916–1920
- Employer: National League

Peter Alfonsus Harrison (February 1, 1885 – March 10, 1921) was an English-American professional baseball umpire. He worked in the National League from 1916 to 1920. He was an active NL umpire at the time of his premature death.

== Biography ==
=== Early life and career ===
Harrison was born in England and his family moved to Youngstown, Ohio, when he was a child. Harrison took up umpiring as a young adult, spending 1911 to 1915 in minor league baseball. His minor league experience included the Ohio–Pennsylvania League, New York State League and International League.

=== National League career ===
Although an Ohio newspaper reported in 1914 that Harrison would undoubtedly join the National League by the end of that season, the umpire actually made his major league debut in 1916. A June 1916 New York Sun article described a game in which fans hurled pop bottles and seat cushions at the new major league umpire: "A nervy fellow this Harrison. He stood with arms folded facing center field and never once winced, though it looked as if one missile nicked his leg." In response to the incident, Harrison said, "What do I think of the Philadelphia fans? Well, this was the first time I ever saw them work, and judging by their form last Tuesday I should say that their control is bad. I wasn't hit once, although I heard that four spectators were struck by bottles.

Harrison umpired 642 major league games in five National League seasons. On October 2, 1920, Harrison and Hank O'Day umpired the last major league tripleheader. Harrison worked behind the plate for all three games. He worked his final major league game the following day.

=== Personal life ===
During the baseball offseason, Harrison worked in a Youngstown steel mill. He was a member of the Knights of Columbus.

=== Death ===
Harrison died of tuberculosis on March 10, 1921, in Saranac Lake, New York. He had been brought there in grave condition a few weeks earlier. His case was said to be complicated by bouts with influenza and appendicitis that he had suffered in the previous year. He was survived by his mother, wife, daughter and four siblings. After his death, Rabbit Maranville said, "Every ball player in the National League will miss Pete Harrison. He's the kind of umpire we need. You could relieve your feelings on Pete, but if you got too fresh he was there to set you down. I was always strong for that boy, and I am deeply grieved over his death."

== See also ==
- List of Major League Baseball umpires (disambiguation)
