= Clarence Cross =

American baseball player (1856–1931)

- Shortstop
- Born: March 4, 1856; St. Louis, Missouri, U.S.
- Died: June 23, 1931 (aged 75); Seattle, Washington, U.S.
- Batted: Right Threw: Right

MLB debut
- May 5, 1884, for the Altoona Mountain City

Last MLB appearance
- October 10, 1887, for the New York Metropolitans

MLB statistics
- Batting average: .226
- Home runs: 0
- Runs batted in: 5
- Stats at Baseball Reference

Teams
- Altoona Mountain City (1884); Philadelphia Keystones (1884); Kansas City Cowboys (1884); New York Metropolitans (1887)

Clarence Cross (born Clarence Crause; March 4, 1856 – June 23, 1931) was a 19th-century American professional baseball shortstop.

== Sources ==
- Career statistics from Baseball Reference · Baseball Reference (Minors) · Retrosheet · Baseball Almanac
