= Henry Oberbeck =

American baseball player (1858–1921)

- Outfielder/Third baseman/Pitcher/Umpire
- Born: May 17, 1858; St. Louis, Missouri, U.S.
- Died: August 26, 1921 (aged 63); St. Louis, Missouri, U.S.
- Batted: Unknown Threw: Unknown

MLB debut
- May 7, 1883, for the Pittsburgh Alleghenys

Last MLB appearance
- October 18, 1884, for the Kansas City Cowboys

MLB statistics
- Batting average: .176
- Home runs: 0
- Runs scored: 27
- Stats at Baseball Reference

Teams
- Pittsburgh Alleghenys (1883); St. Louis Browns (1883); Baltimore Monumentals (1884); Kansas City Cowboys (1884)

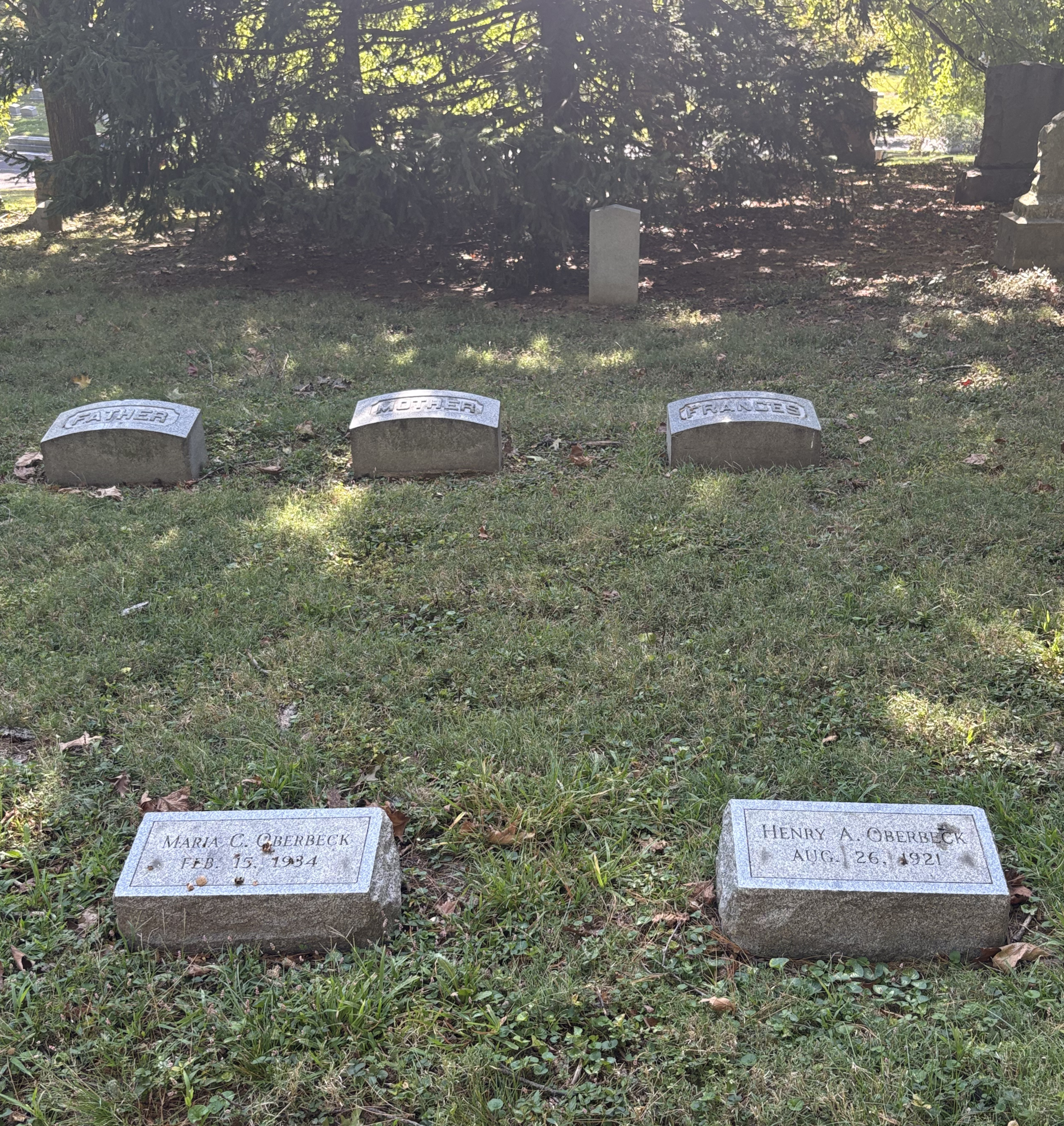
Oberbeck's grave (lower right) at Bellefontaine Cemetery

Henry A. Oberbeck (May 17, 1858 – August 26, 1921) was an American 19th-century professional baseball outfielder, third baseman, pitcher and umpire. He played in 75 Major League games in both the American Association and the Union Association in 1883 and 1884.

Oberbeck collected 42 hits in 238 at bats for a .176 career batting average. He also pitched in eight games in his two-year Major League career, finishing with a 0–5 win–loss record.

For three games in 1884, Oberbeck was used as an umpire for the Union Association.

He died in St. Louis on August 26, 1921, and was buried at Bellefontaine Cemetery.
