= Doug Crothers =

American baseball player (1859–1907)

- Pitcher
- Born: November 16, 1859; Natchez, Mississippi, U.S.
- Died: March 29, 1907 (aged 47); St. Louis, Missouri, U.S.
- Batted: Right Threw: Right

MLB debut
- August 3, 1884, for the Kansas City Cowboys

Last MLB appearance
- September 3, 1885, for the New York Metropolitans

MLB statistics
- Win–loss record: 8–13
- Strikeouts: 51
- Earned run average: 4.63
- Stats at Baseball Reference

Teams
- Kansas City Cowboys (1884); New York Metropolitans (1885)

Douglass Crothers (November 16, 1859 – March 29, 1907) was an American Major League Baseball pitcher. He played for the Kansas City Cowboys of the Union Association in 1884 and the New York Metropolitans of the American Association in 1885. He played in the minor leagues through 1892.
