= Jim Cudworth =

American baseball player (1858–1943)

- First baseman / Outfielder
- Born: August 22, 1858; Fairhaven, Massachusetts, U.S.
- Died: December 21, 1943 (aged 85); Middleboro, Massachusetts, U.S.
- Batted: Right Threw: Right

MLB debut
- July 27, 1884, for the Kansas City Cowboys

Last MLB appearance
- September 10, 1884, for the Kansas City Cowboys

MLB statistics
- Batting average: .147
- Home runs: 0
- Runs scored: 0
- Stats at Baseball Reference

Teams
- Kansas City Cowboys (1884)

James Alaric Cudworth (August 22, 1858 – December 21, 1943) was a 19th-century American professional baseball player. Nicknamed "Cuddy", he played for the Kansas City Cowboys of the Union Association in 1884.
