= Ed Redys =

American baseball player and coach

Redys

Edward Redys (June 23, 1921 – May 9, 2009) was an American Minor League Baseball player and Major League Baseball coach.

== Playing career ==
Ed Redys was born June 23, 1921, in Detroit, Michigan. His professional baseball career started as a pitcher in the St. Louis Browns organization. In 1942, while assigned to the San Antonio Missions minor league team, Redys suffered an ankle injury and did not pitch the rest of the season. Before he could return from injury, he was drafted and served in the U.S. Army. After not playing baseball for the remainder of the war, he returned in 1946 and injured his elbow. Although he played a few more years of minor league baseball, he was never promoted to the major league club. Between stints in 1940–1941 and 1946–1947, he finished with a 28–26 minor-league win–loss record and a 3.29 earned run average

== Coaching career ==
In 1950, after two years as the batting practice pitcher for the St. Louis Browns, he was named a coach by Bill DeWitt, the owner of the Browns. In 1950, the Browns went 58-96 and were second to last in the league standings. In 1951, Bill Veeck became the owner of the team and signed Satchel Paige to the team. As part of a push for increasing the entertainment value at games, Redys and three other members of the Browns organization formed a band that would play during the Seventh-inning stretch. Redys was the accordion player, with Al Widmar on bass or fiddle, John Beradino on conga or maracas, and Satchel Paige on snare drum. The 1951 Browns went 52-102 and finished last in the American League. Veeck hired Roger Hornsby as the manager and he replaced the entire coaching staff, including Redys after the 1951 season.
