= Milt Whitehead =

Canadian baseball player (1862–1901)

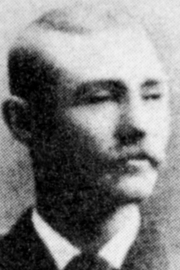
- Shortstop
- Born: 1862; Toronto, Ontario, Canada
- Died: August 15, 1901; Highland, California, United States
- Batted: Switch Threw: Right

MLB debut
- April 20, 1884, for the St. Louis Maroons

Last MLB appearance
- October 19, 1884, for the Kansas City Cowboys

MLB statistics
- Batting average: .207
- Home runs: 1
- Runs scored: 63
- Stats at Baseball Reference

Teams
- St. Louis Maroons (1884); Kansas City Cowboys (1884)

Milton Pringle Whitehead (1862 - August 15, 1901) was a Canadian born Major League Baseball player who played shortstop in 1884. He would play for the St. Louis Maroons and Kansas City Cowboys.
