= Billy O'Brien (baseball) =

American baseball player (1860–1911)

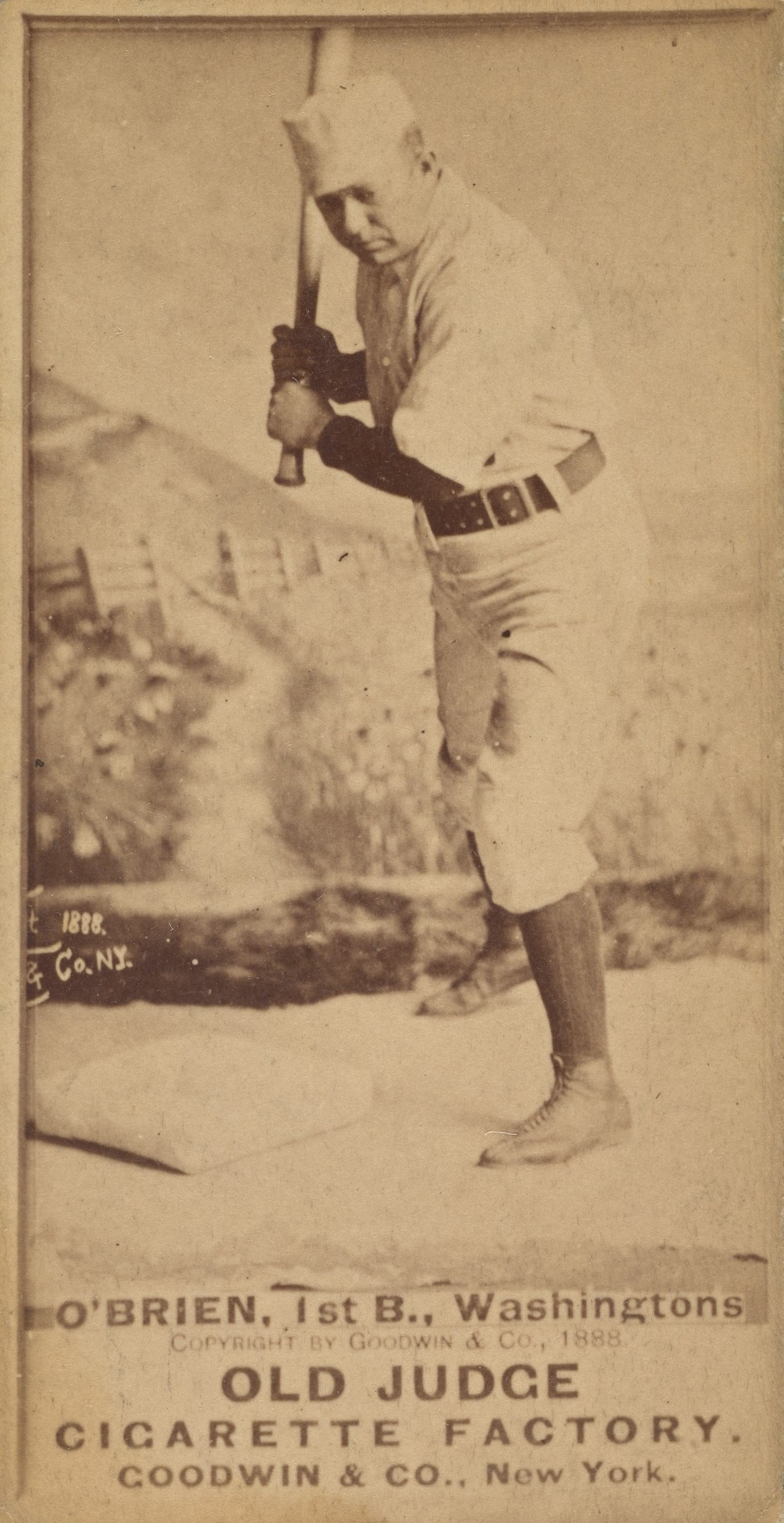
- 1888 baseball card of O'Brien
- First baseman
- Born: March 14, 1860; Albany, New York, U.S.
- Died: May 26, 1911 (aged 51); Kansas City, Missouri, U.S.
- Batted: Right Threw: Right

MLB debut
- September 27, 1884, for the St. Paul Saints

Last MLB appearance
- August 12, 1890, for the Brooklyn Gladiators

MLB statistics
- Batting average: .256
- Home runs: 32
- Runs batted in: 206
- Stats at Baseball Reference

Teams
- St. Paul Saints (1884); Kansas City Cowboys (1884); Washington Nationals (1887–1889); Brooklyn Gladiators (1890)

Career highlights and awards
- NL home run leader (1887)

William Smith O'Brien (March 14, 1860 – May 26, 1911) was an American Major League Baseball player who played first base. He was considered a "one-year wonder" and led the National League (NL) in home runs in 1887.

== Baseball career ==
O'Brien was born in Albany, New York, in 1860. He started his professional baseball career in 1884 and spent most of the season with the St. Paul Apostles of the Northwestern League. In September, O'Brien made his major league debut in the Union Association, playing a total of 12 games for the St. Paul Saints and Kansas City Cowboys. He then played in the minor leagues in 1885 and 1886.

In March 1887, O'Brien was acquired by the NL's Washington Nationals. That season, he played 113 games, batting .278 with 73 runs batted in (RBI) and a 126 OPS+. He led the league in home runs, with 19. In 1888, O'Brien's play declined. He had a .225 batting average, 9 home runs, 66 RBI, and a 79 OPS+. In 1889, O'Brien played two games for the Nationals before being released in May. He spent the rest of the year with the Rochester Jingoes of the International League.

O'Brien returned to the majors in 1890 with the American Association's Brooklyn Gladiators. Just like in 1884, the addition of a third major league allowed him to receive playing time in the worst of the three circuits. In 96 games that season, O'Brien batted .278 with 4 home runs, 67 RBI, and a 121 OPS+. He played his last MLB game in August.

O'Brien played for various minor league teams from 1891 to 1896 before retiring from professional baseball. His 1887 season with Washington remained his best in either the majors or minors. In 356 career MLB games, O'Brien had a .256 batting average, 32 home runs, 206 RBI, and a 107 OPS+.

O'Brien died in Kansas City, Missouri, in 1911.

== See also ==
- List of Major League Baseball annual home run leaders
