= Bill Dugan (baseball) =

American baseball player (1864–1921)

- Catcher
- Born: 1864; New York, New York, U.S.
- Died: July 24, 1921 (aged 56–57); New York, New York, U.S.
- Batted: Unknown Threw: Unknown

MLB debut
- August 5, 1884, for the Richmond Virginians

Last MLB appearance
- September 23, 1884, for the Kansas City Cowboys

MLB statistics
- Batting average: .088
- Home runs: 0
- Runs batted in: 0
- Stats at Baseball Reference

Teams
- Richmond Virginians (1884); Kansas City Cowboys (1884)

William H. Dugan (1864 – July 24, 1921) was an American professional baseball catcher. He played during the 1884 season for the Richmond Virginians of the American Association and the Kansas City Cowboys of the Union Association. His brother, Ed Dugan, was his teammate on the Virginians. He played with four different minor league teams in 1885 and finished his career in the New England League in 1887.
