= Billy Colgan =

American baseball player

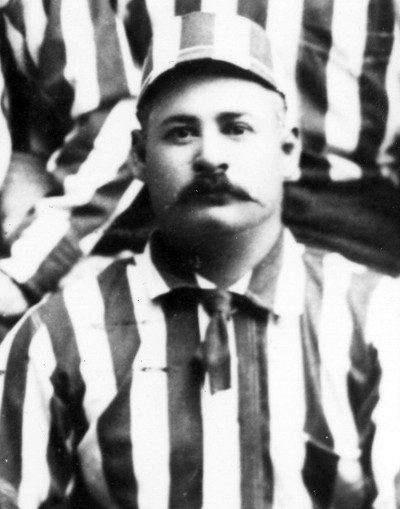
- Colgan in 1890
- Catcher
- Born: Unknown; East St. Louis, Illinois, U.S.
- Died: August 8, 1895; Great Falls, Montana, U.S.
- Batted: Unknown Threw: Unknown

MLB debut
- May 3, 1884, for the Pittsburgh Alleghenys

Last MLB appearance
- October 15, 1884, for the Pittsburgh Alleghenys

MLB statistics
- Batting average: .155
- Home runs: 0
- Runs scored: 10
- Stats at Baseball Reference

Teams
- Pittsburgh Alleghenys (1884)

William H. Colgan (Unknown – August 8, 1895) was an American catcher in Major League Baseball. He played for the 1884 Pittsburgh Alleghenys.
