= Conny Doyle =

Irish baseball player (1862–1931)

- Outfielder
- Born: 1862; Ireland
- Died: July 29, 1931 (aged 68–69); El Paso, Texas, U.S.
- Batted: Unknown Threw: Unknown

MLB debut
- June 23, 1883, for the Philadelphia Quakers

Last MLB appearance
- September 13, 1884, for the Pittsburgh Alleghenys

MLB statistics
- Games played: 31
- At bats: 126
- Hits: 32
- Stats at Baseball Reference

Teams
- Philadelphia Quakers (1883); Pittsburgh Alleghenys (1884)

Cornelius J. Doyle (1862 – July 29, 1931) was an Irish born Major League Baseball outfielder. He played in the Majors in 1883 and 1884 for the Philadelphia Quakers and Pittsburgh Alleghenys. He continued to play professionally in the minor leagues through 1893.
