= George Rettger =

American baseball player (1868–1921)

- Pitcher
- Born: July 29, 1868; Cleveland, Ohio, U.S.
- Died: June 5, 1921 (aged 52); Lakewood, Ohio, U.S.
- Batted: Right Threw: Right

MLB debut
- August 13, 1891, for the St. Louis Browns

Last MLB appearance
- July 16, 1892, for the Cincinnati Reds

MLB statistics
- Win–loss record: 9–6
- Earned run average: 3.67
- Strikeouts: 62
- Stats at Baseball Reference

Teams
- St. Louis Browns (1891); Cleveland Spiders (1892); Cincinnati Reds (1892)

George Edward Rettger (July 29, 1868 – June 5, 1921) was a 19th-century American Major League Baseball pitcher.
