= John Farrell (second baseman) =

American baseball player (1876–1921)

- Second baseman
- Born: December 4, 1876; Covington, Kentucky, U.S.
- Died: May 14, 1921 (aged 44); Kansas City, Missouri, U.S.
- Batted: Right Threw: Right

MLB debut
- April 26, 1901, for the Washington Senators

Last MLB appearance
- April 25, 1905, for the St. Louis Cardinals

MLB statistics
- Batting average: .261
- Home runs: 4
- Runs batted in: 141
- Stats at Baseball Reference

Teams
- Washington Senators (1901); St. Louis Cardinals (1902–1905)

John Sebastian Farrell (December 4, 1876 – May 14, 1921) was an American professional baseball second baseman. He played in Major League Baseball (MLB) for the Washington Senators and St. Louis Cardinals from 1901 to 1905.
