= Frank McLaughlin (baseball) =

American baseball player (1856–1917)

- Shortstop
- Born: June 19, 1856; Ireland
- Died: April 5, 1917 (aged 60); Lowell, Massachusetts, U.S.
- Batted: Right Threw: Right

MLB debut
- August 9, 1882, for the Worcester Ruby Legs

Last MLB appearance
- August 19, 1884, for the Kansas City Cowboys (UA)

MLB statistics
- Batting average: .228
- Home runs: 5
- Hits: 97
- Stats at Baseball Reference

Teams
- Worcester Ruby Legs (1882); Pittsburgh Alleghenys (1883); Cincinnati Outlaw Reds (1884); Chicago Browns/Pittsburgh Stogies (1884); Kansas City Cowboys (1884)

For information about the artist Frank McLaughlin, please see Frank McLaughlin (artist).

Francis Edward McLaughlin (June 19, 1856 – April 5, 1917) was an Irish born infielder for Major League Baseball in the 19th century.

== Sources ==
- Career statistics from Baseball Reference · Baseball Reference (Minors) · Retrosheet · Baseball Almanac
- Frank McLaughlin stats
- The Baseball Nexus
