= Hal Mauck =

American baseball player (1869–1921)

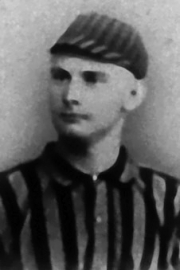
- Pitcher
- Born: March 6, 1869; Princeton, Indiana, U.S.
- Died: April 27, 1921 (aged 52); Princeton, Indiana, U.S.
- Batted: Right Threw: Right

MLB debut
- April 29, 1893, for the Chicago Colts

Last MLB appearance
- August 10, 1893, for the Chicago Colts

MLB statistics
- Win–loss record: 8–10
- Earned run average: 4.41
- Strikeouts: 23
- Stats at Baseball Reference

Teams
- Chicago Colts (1893)

Alfred Maris Mauck (March 6, 1869 – April 27, 1921) was an American Major League Baseball player who played pitcher in 1893. He played for the Chicago Colts.
