= Ted Sullivan (baseball) =

Irish baseball player and manager (1851–1929)

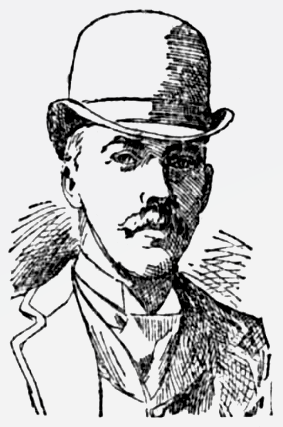
- An 1893 illustration of Sullivan
- Manager / Right fielder
- Born: March 17, 1851; County Clare, Ireland
- Died: July 5, 1929 (aged 78); Washington, D. C., U.S.
- Batted: Unknown Threw: Unknown

MLB debut
- July 16, 1884, for the Kansas City Cowboys

Last MLB appearance
- October 18, 1884, for the Kansas City Cowboys

MLB statistics
- Games played: 4
- At bats: 11
- Batting average: .364
- Stats at Baseball Reference

Teams
- As player: Kansas City Cowboys (1884); As manager: St. Louis Browns (1883); St. Louis Maroons (1884); Kansas City Cowboys (1884); Washington Nationals (1888)

Timothy Paul "Ted" Sullivan (March 17, 1851 – July 5, 1929) was an Irish born manager and player in Major League Baseball who was born in County Clare, Ireland.

== Career ==
After attending St. Mary's College (in St. Mary's, Kansas) and Saint Louis University, he managed four teams during the 1880s, one of which was the 1884 St. Louis Maroons of the Union Association, which finished with an astonishing 94–19 record. He began the year with a 28–3 record, but moved on in midseason to manage another UA team, the Kansas City Cowboys; Fred Dunlap took over in St. Louis, compiling a 66–16 record as the Maroons won the UA pennant in the league's only year of existence. Kansas City was a dismal 3–17 when Sullivan took over managerial duties, going 13–46 the rest of way. During his time in Kansas City, he also made his only three field appearances, playing two games in right field and one as a shortstop; he collected three hits in nine at bats. He did not manage again until the 1888 Washington Nationals, then 10–29, hired him to finish out the season. He led the team to a mark of 38–57, and ended his major league career with a record of 132–132. Sullivan later managed in the minors, including a stint with the Nashville Tigers of the Southern League in 1893.

Sullivan is considered a pioneer of early baseball; he founded both the Northwest League and the Texas League, both minor leagues that still exist and thrive today. Credited with discovering Charles Comiskey, he is considered by some to be the first person to emphasize the importance of scouting. Comiskey joined the St. Louis Browns in 1882, and replaced Sullivan as the team's manager in mid-1883; it had been Sullivan's first managerial post, as he compiled a record of 53–26 to begin the year. Also, Sullivan was a great promoter of the game; he would tell stories of baseball's beginnings, and of its many star players. He authored books detailing these, including a barnstorming trip around the world in 1913–1914 by Comiskey's Chicago White Sox and the New York Giants. He also credited himself as the originator of the word "fan", as in baseball fan. Sullivan later became a team executive and owner.

== Post-career ==
Sullivan died in Washington, D.C. at the age of 78, and is interred at Calvary Catholic Cemetery in Milwaukee, Wisconsin.

== See also ==
- List of Major League Baseball player–managers
- List of players from Ireland in Major League Baseball
