= Toledo White Stockings =

- 1894–1895; Toledo, Ohio

Minor league affiliations
- Class: Class A (1894–1895)
- League: Western League (1894–1895)

Major league affiliations
- Team: None

Minor league titles
- League titles: None

Team data
- Name: Toledo White Stockings (1894); Toledo Swamp Angels (1895)
- Ballpark: Whitestocking Park (1894–1895); Ewing Street Park (1894–1895)

The Toledo White Stockings were a minor league baseball team based in Toledo, Ohio. In 1894 and 1895, Toledo teams played exclusively as members of the Class A (highest minor league level) Western League. Toledo was known as the "Swamp Angels" in 1895, before the team relocated as the result of Blue laws. The Western League evolved to become today's American League in 1901. The team hosted minor league home games at both Whitestocking Park and Ewing Street Park.

== History ==
Minor league baseball began in Toledo with the 1883 Toledo Blue Stockings, who played the season as members of the Northwestern League, before becoming a major league franchise in the American Association in 1884. The White Stockings were immediately preceded in minor league play by the 1892 Toledo Black Pirates, who played the season in Western League.

In 1894, the Toledo "White Stockings" became a member of the reformed eight-team Class A level Western League. After not playing in 1893, the Western League was reformed in 1894 under new league president Ban Johnson and under Johnson it evolved to become today's American League in 1901. In 1894, Toledo was joined by the Detroit Creams, Grand Rapids Rippers, Indianapolis Hoosiers, Kansas City Cowboys, Milwaukee Brewers, Minneapolis Millers and Sioux City Cornhuskers in league play. The Toledo franchise was owned and managed by Denny Long.

In their first season of play, the 1894 Toledo White Stockings placed second in the 1894 Western League, which had no playoffs in the era. Playing under owner/manager Denny Long, Toledo ended the season with a 67–55 record and finished 5.5 games behind the first place Sioux City Cornhuskers in the final Western League standings.

In 1895, the Toledo Swamp Angels continued play in the Western League, before the franchise relocated during the season. Some references have the team continuing under the "White Stockings" nickname in 1895.

During the 1895 season, Common Pleas Court Judge Charles Pratt issued a temporary restraining order before the first scheduled Sunday game prohibiting the White Stockings from playing baseball on Sunday. The injunction was later made permanent. No Sunday games had been scheduled by Toledo in 1894, but there were Sunday games scheduled in 1895. The Toledo franchise relocated during the season as a result.

On June 30, 1895, Toledo had a 23–28 record when the team relocated to become the Terre Haute Hottentots. Toledo had blue laws in the era, which prohibited work on Sundays. As a result, ownership was forced to seek alternatives for games scheduled on Sundays after the blue laws were supported by the court action prohibiting Toledo from playing Sunday professional baseball games. The loss of potential revenue forced the team moved to Terre Haute. The Toledo/Terre Haute team finished seventh in the standings, playing the season under managers Denny Long and William Schneider. The combined team ended the season with a final record of 52–72 and finished 27.0 games behind the first place Indianapolis Hoosiers in the final standings.

Notably, Toledo player Bob Gilks had six hits in a game in both the 1894 and 1895 seasons.

In 1896, Toledo resumed minor league play, as the Toledo Mud Hens began play as members of the Interstate League. The "Mud Hens" continue minor league play today.

== The ballpark ==
The Toledo White Stockings played minor league home games at Whitestocking Park. The ballpark was located on LaGrange Street between Hudson Street & Pearl Street.

Toledo was noted to have played select home minor league games at Ewing Street Park. Ewing Street Park was located near the abandoned Olympic Park, which had hosted the Toledo Black Sox in 1892. Ewing street Park was noted to have twice the capacity of Whitestocking Park. Ewing Park was located on Ewing Street between Dorr Street & Pinewood Avenue.

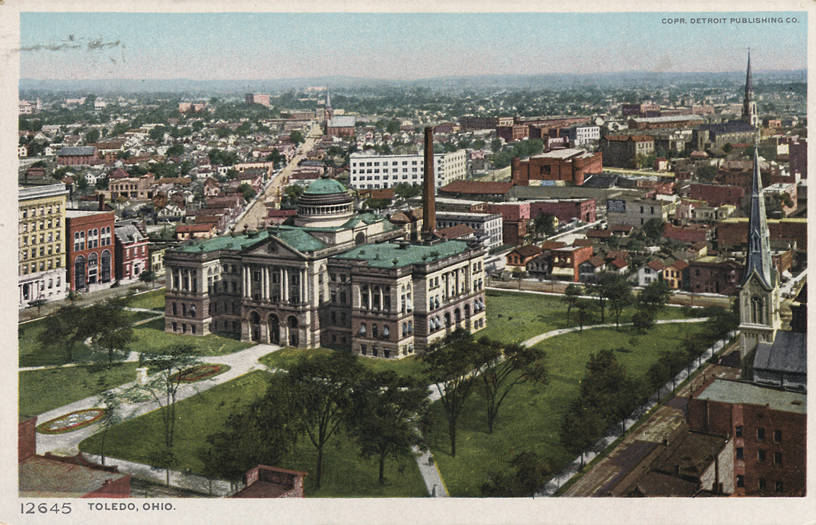
Early postcard. Toledo, Ohio

== Timeline ==
Year(s)	# Yrs.	Team	Level	League	Ballparks
1894	1	Toledo White Stockings	Class A	Western League	Whitestocking Park / Ewing Street Park
1895	1	Toledo Swamp Angels	Class A	Western League	Whitestocking Park / Ewing Street Park

== Year–by–year records ==
Year	Record	Finish	Manager(s)	Playoffs/notes
1894	67–55	2nd	Denny Long	No playoffs held
1895	52–72	7th	Denny Long / William Schneider	Toledo (23-28) moved to Terre Haute June 30

== Notable alumni ==
- Jack Carney (1894–1895)
- Jim Connor (1894–1895)
- Bill Dammann (1895)
- Frank Foreman (1894)
- Charlie Frank (1894)
- Bob Gilks (1894–1895)
- Jot Goar (1895)
- Fred Hartman (1895)
- Gil Hatfield (1894)
- George Henry (1894)
- Will Holland (1894)
- Jim Hughey (1894–1895)
- Abbie Johnson (1895)
- Henry Killeen (1894)
- Pat Luby (1894)
- Ed McFarland (1894)
- Joe McGuckin (1894)
- Dusty Miller (1894)
- Tom Niland (1894–1895)
- Jerry Nops (1895)
- George Rettger (1894)
- Charlie Petty (1895)
- Jim Ritz (1894)
- Mike Roach (1895)
- Frank Scheibeck (1895)
- Kid Summers (1894)

== See also ==
- Toledo White Stockings players
- Toledo Swamp Angels players
- List of baseball parks in Toledo, Ohio
