= Designated for assignment =

Contractual term in Major League Baseball

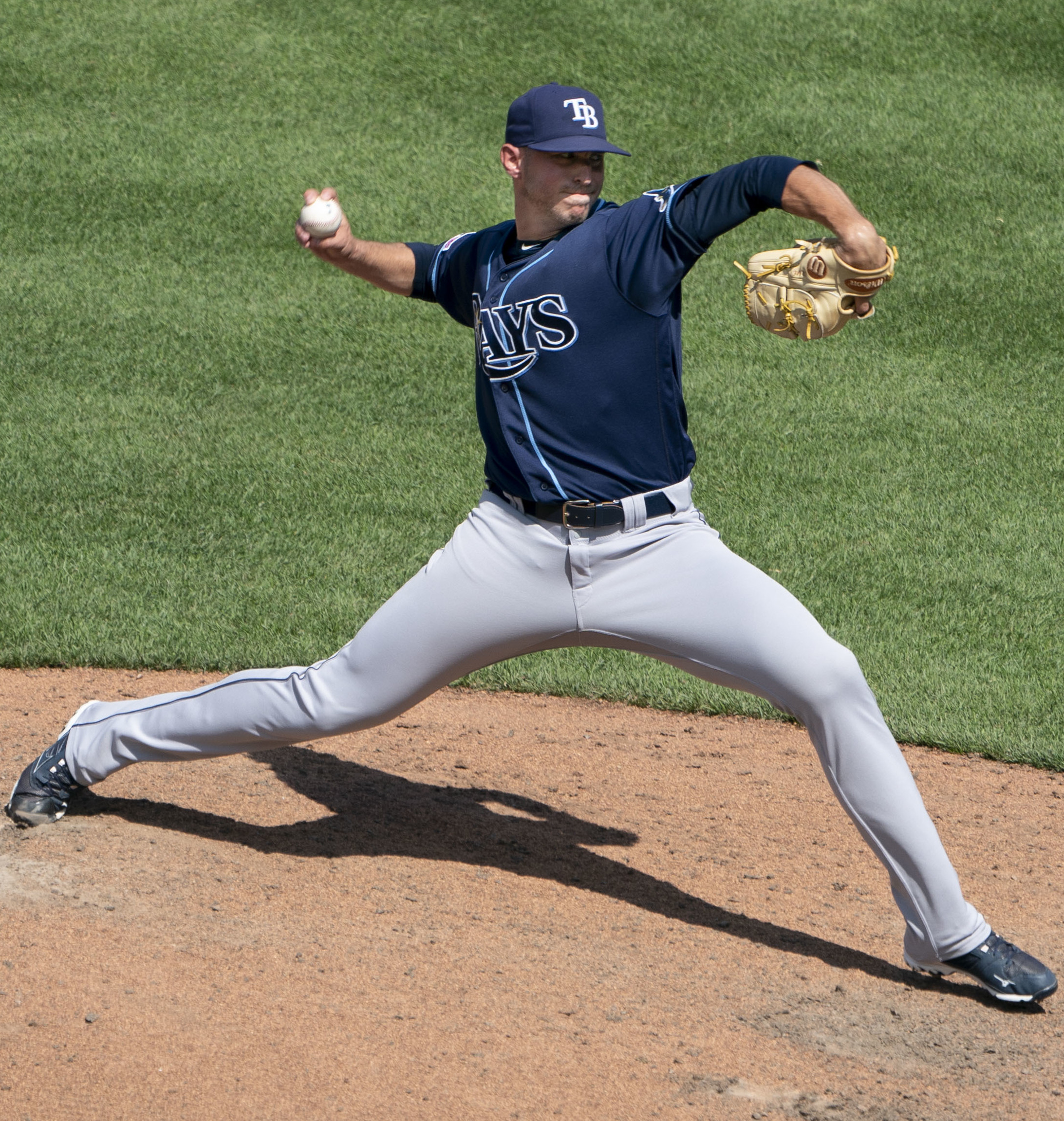
Oliver Drake was designated for assignment multiple times during the 2018 season, during which he pitched for five different teams.

Designated for assignment (DFA) is a contractual term used in Major League Baseball (MLB). A player who is designated for assignment is immediately removed from the team's 40-man roster, after which the team must, within seven days, (Note: Prior to 2017, the time limit was 10 days.) return the player to the 40-man roster, place the player on waivers, trade the player, release the player, or "send outright" the player to Minor League Baseball.

== Governance ==
MLB player transactions are governed by The Official Professional Baseball Rules Book. (Note: This document governs MLB's business rules, not its playing rules.) Rule 2(k), titled "Designated Players", along with Rule 10(g), titled "Player Limit", govern the transaction known as "designated for assignment". It is not specifically named as such, although within Rule 10(b), titled "The Procedures for Obtaining Waivers", the term "designate for assignment" is used. Media use of the phrase dates to at least 1955.

== Contractual moves ==
=== Place the player on waivers ===
Typically, a player is placed on waivers after being designated for assignment for the purpose of outrighting him to one of the club's minor league teams. A player who is outrighted to the minors is removed from the 40-man roster but still paid according to the terms of his guaranteed contract. A player can be outrighted only once in his career without his consent. But a player must "clear waivers" (that is, have no other team place a waiver claim on him) to be sent to a minor league team. Also, if the player has five or more full years of major league service, he must consent to be assigned to the minors. If the player withholds consent, the team must either release him or keep him on the major league roster. In either case, the player must continue to be paid under the terms of his contract.

=== Trade the player ===
Once a player is designated for assignment, he may be traded. Some teams have been known to designate players for assignment to increase interest in the player, especially among teams that are not at the top of the waiver list (the order of which is determined by record). For example, in May 2006, Texas Rangers reliever Brian Shouse was designated for assignment and then traded to the Milwaukee Brewers four days later. The Brewers could have waited until Shouse was placed on waivers so as not to have had to give up a player in a trade, but according to the waiver rules, they would have risked losing the claim if a team ahead of them in line had also put a claim in on him.

Additionally, under the 10-and-5 rights, if a player has ten years of major league service, the last five with his current team, he cannot be traded without his consent.

=== Release the player ===
If a player is not traded but has cleared waivers, he may be released from the team. The player is then a free agent and may sign with any team, including the team that just released him. The team that released him is responsible for the salary the player is owed, less what he is paid by the team that signs him. In practice, the amount paid by the signing team is usually a prorated portion of the Major League minimum salary.

However, if the player is a Rule 5 draft pick, the player must be offered back to the club from which he was selected in the Rule 5 draft for $50,000, half of the amount the team which selected him had to pay. If the original club declines to pay and pick up the player, he is free to sign with any team.

=== Outright from the 40-man roster ===
After clearing waivers when being designated for assignment, a player is often removed outright from the 40-man roster and transferred to the roster of a minor-league affiliate of the organization. Outrighting can also happen to a player who is already in the minors but occupying a 40-man roster space that the organization wishes to fill with another player. A player can only be outrighted without his consent once during his career, and a player with more than five years of major league service time can reject an outright. After rejecting an outright assignment, a player is a free agent.

== See also ==
- Major League Baseball transactions
