= Major League Baseball relocations of 1950s–1960s =

The Major League Baseball relocations of the 1950s–1960s brought several Major League Baseball franchises to the Western and Southern United States, expanding the league's geographical reach. This was in stark contrast to the early years of modern baseball, when the American League placed teams in National League cities. Chicago, Boston, Philadelphia, and St. Louis had two teams; New York City had three. With no teams west of St. Louis or south of Washington, D.C., baseball was effectively confined to the Northeast and Midwest.

Baseball's expansion mirrored the westward movement of the U.S. population during a flourishing postwar economy that saw the arrival of commercial jet travel. Economic push and pull factors caused many teams to move, and the emergence of cities in the new frontier allowed baseball teams to pop up across the country. The moves of the Brooklyn Dodgers and New York Giants to California in 1958 opened the West Coast to the market of baseball.

Since 1960, the National and American Leagues have added a total of 14 teams (seven in each league).

== Early history ==
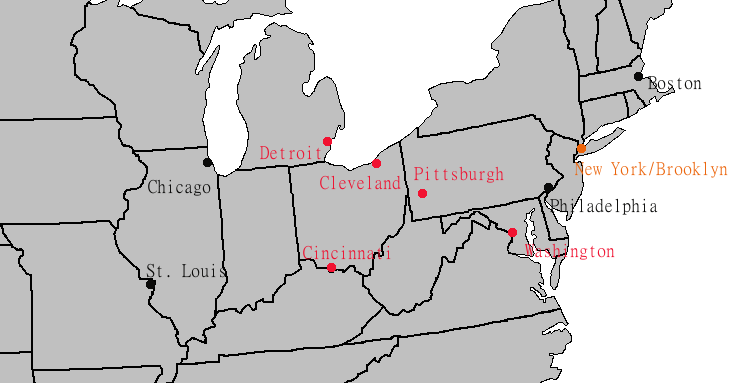
Cities that hosted MLB teams from 1903 to 1953; cities that hosted one team are in red, cities that hosted two teams are in black. New York/Brooklyn, with three teams, is in orange. No major league baseball teams moved or were added between 1903 and 1953.

During the early years of the American League as a major league, the league placed franchises in cities that were either in direct competition with National League teams (New York City, Chicago, Boston, Philadelphia, and St. Louis) or in markets abandoned by the National League after the 1899 contraction (Cleveland; Washington, D.C.; and briefly Baltimore). Only Detroit, home of the Detroit Tigers, was a true "new" baseball market for the American League, although the National League had previously hosted the Detroit Wolverines between 1881 and 1888.

In these early years, only two National League markets had no American League counterpart: Cincinnati and Pittsburgh. The American League agreed not to place a team in Pittsburgh, home to the then-dominant Pittsburgh Pirates, as part of the National Agreement in 1903. No second team was placed in Cincinnati to compete with the Cincinnati Reds.

After the remains of the original American League Baltimore Orioles went to New York in 1903, where they ultimately became reborn as the New York Yankees, no major league team moved for 50 years. This also reflected the population at the time, as most of the major population areas were in the Northeast and Midwestern United States in the aftermath of Reconstruction and later the Great Migration. An abortive attempt to move the St. Louis Browns to Los Angeles in December 1941 was derailed by the entry of the U.S. into World War II. Until the 1950s, Baseball was tied to the history and culture of New York City, home to three of the best teams: the Yankees, Giants and Dodgers.

== Beginning of the moves ==
Locations of teams for the 1942–1953 American League seasons
American League
Locations of teams for the 1943–1952 National League seasons
National League

Over the years, though, it became apparent that one team would be more popular than the other in a given market. In cities with multiple teams, owners would be competing with each over the same fan base. The economics of the game began to change with the increase in live media coverage, especially television. The owners had a plan, and that was to have one team in each city, so that owners would not need to fight each other over customers. Boston would lose the Braves. Philadelphia would lose the A's. St. Louis would lose the Browns. New York would lose the Giants and the Dodgers.

In Boston, despite the Boston Braves having been established much longer in the city and arguably being the oldest continuing professional sports franchise in North America, the Boston Red Sox were by far the more popular team at the gate and with fans. In addition, the Red Sox were largely successful on the field (except in the immediate years after selling Babe Ruth to the Yankees) while the Braves were an also-ran and often in the second division of the National League. In stark contrast, the National League was able to hang on to St. Louis, where the St. Louis Cardinals were more successful than the St. Louis Browns.

One oddity would be Philadelphia, where the American League's Philadelphia Athletics were by far the more popular team in the city, led by longtime manager Connie Mack, as the Philadelphia Phillies were mostly losing during this period. However, with the Phillies enjoying rare success in 1950 at the hands of the Whiz Kids, the tables instantly turned on the Athletics. Additionally, a "spite fence" built at Shibe Park in 1935 (to keep spectators outside of the ballpark from watching the game for free), had the unintended result of the Athletics alienating their fan base in Philadelphia. Still, the Phillies would not win a World Series until 1980, the last of the "original 16" teams to win a series and 25 years after the Athletics left town, during which they would win three more World Series championships before the Phillies broke through.

In New York City, the Yankees had long passed the New York Giants in popularity, though the Giants remained popular and the Brooklyn Dodgers were gaining popularity as well.

Chicago would see the Cubs as roughly equal in popularity to the White Sox despite their constant losing seasons and the Curse of the Billy Goat allegedly preventing the Cubs from making the Fall Classic from 1945 to 2016. This can likely be attributed to the after effects of the Black Sox Scandal of 1919 still apparent on the White Sox, who on several occasions nearly moved out of the Windy City. However the White Sox have not threatened, nor been considered a candidate for moving, since the opening of new Comiskey Park (now Rate Field) in 1991, with their 2005 World Series victory further cementing their future in Chicago.

== The moves ==
Locations of teams for the 1968 American League season
American League
Locations of teams for the 1966–1968 National League seasons
National League

The first moves were initially lateral moves. As they were tied down to slow railroad timetables, the first teams that moved stayed within Major League Baseball historical geographical core: the Northeast and upper Midwest, and to markets which did not have Major League Baseball.

=== The exit of the National League from Boston ===
The first move was the Boston Braves, who moved (for 1953) to Milwaukee, home of their top farm team, the Milwaukee Brewers. The City of Milwaukee fell in love with the Braves, with fan support of the team high, making the move highly profitable. The Milwaukee Braves would remain popular until the team moved to Atlanta in 1966.

=== The exit of the American League from St. Louis and Philadelphia ===
Other owners took notice and began to issue similar threats. The St. Louis Browns moved to Baltimore for 1954, becoming the Baltimore Orioles (this was the era's sole west-to-east move). The Philadelphia Athletics moved to Kansas City for 1955, briefly displacing the Cardinals as the westernmost town in the majors. Save for some controversy with the Athletics, these moves were not controversial, as these were three of the least successful teams in the majors, although the Browns and Braves had both won league championships in the 1940s.

=== The exit of the National League from New York City ===
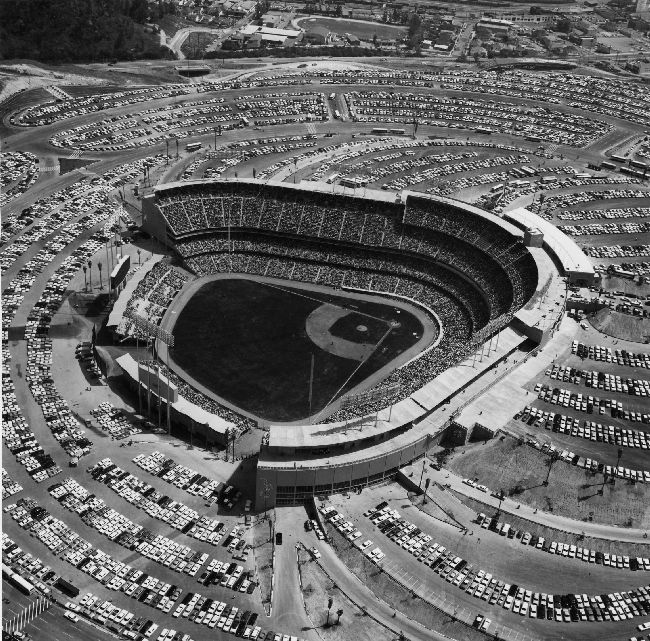
Dodger Stadium c. 1960s

Baseball experts consider Walter O'Malley to be "perhaps the most influential owner of baseball's early expansion era". Following the 1957 Major League Baseball season, he moved the Dodgers to Los Angeles. For years O'Malley had tried to secure a site for a new stadium for the Dodgers in Brooklyn to no avail. The Dodgers' home at the time, Ebbets Field, was old and obsolete. Despite the Dodgers dominating the league, attendance at Ebbets Field dwindled, likely because of its age and the difficulty of accessing the stadium by car. Another explanation for the decline in attendance is the migration to the suburbs. People living in the suburbs did not want to attend games at night in the inner city. Frustrated, he began to look elsewhere.

With the post–World War II population shifts south and west and the rise in transcontinental airplane service, many West Coast cities were actively pursuing Major League Baseball to move there; among them Los Angeles and San Francisco. Rosalind Wyman, the then-head of the Los Angeles Chamber of Commerce, was one of those championing a major league team in Los Angeles. Beginning in 1955, with the city's blessing, she began to solicit several major league teams, including the Dodgers, with the idea that they move to Los Angeles. Wyman and city officials attended the 1956 World Series between the Dodgers and the Yankees, at Ebbets Field, initially to meet with Washington Senators owner Calvin Griffith who was attending the game, to convince Griffith to move his ailing Senators to Los Angeles. O'Malley, upon hearing of the planned meeting, immediately summoned Wyman for a meeting and earnestly began negotiations with her expressing his intent to have a new modern stadium built for the team, a request Wyman and city officials assured O'Malley would be no problem. Initially O'Malley planned to use his negotiations with Los Angeles as a ploy in his dealings with New York's all-powerful public building and development czar Robert Moses, who was preventing O'Malley from obtaining the site he was looking for in Brooklyn for his new stadium. However, as negotiations with Moses deteriorated—Moses wanted the Dodgers to move to a new stadium site in Flushing Meadows–Corona Park in Queens, which eventually became Shea Stadium—O'Malley realized that a deal with Los Angeles began to seem more of a reality. In addition, in Los Angeles, the Dodgers would be given land at Chavez Ravine free of charge to build a stadium, which would eventually become Dodger Stadium.

At the same time New York Giants owner Horace Stoneham was considering a move for the Giants. The Giants' aging home, the Polo Grounds, was becoming dilapidated by the mid-fifties, leading to a drop off in attendance for the team. Stoneham, like O'Malley, was also unable to secure a new stadium site for the team and initially was looking to move the Giants to Minneapolis, home to the Giants' top farm team, the Minneapolis Millers. O'Malley invited San Francisco Mayor George Christopher to New York to meet with Stoneham and convinced him to join O'Malley on the West Coast at the end of the 1957 season, thus bringing the two teams' New York rivalry out to California. O'Malley needed another team to go west with him, for had he moved out west alone, the St. Louis Cardinals—1,600 mi (2,575 km) away— would have been the closest National League team. The joint move would make West Coast road trips economical for visiting teams. Since the meetings occurred during the 1957 season and against the wishes of Commissioner of Baseball Ford Frick, there was media gamesmanship. When O'Malley moved the Dodgers from Brooklyn, the story transcended the world of sport and he found himself on the cover of Time magazine. The cover art for the issue was created by sports cartoonist Willard Mullin, long noted for his caricature of the "Brooklyn Bum" that personified the team.

The dual moves broke the hearts of New York's National League fans, but ultimately were successful for both franchises and for Major League Baseball. The move was an immediate success as well, because the Dodgers set a major-league, single-game attendance record in their first home appearance, with 78,672 fans at the Los Angeles Memorial Coliseum, which would be their temporary home for several years until their new stadium was ready.

The moves received considerable controversy: the loss of the Dodgers was especially painful because the team was one of the last vestiges of Brooklyn's status as a city in its own right prior to 1898. Professional baseball would not return to Brooklyn until 2001, in the form of the minor-league Brooklyn Cyclones team playing at Coney Island, but Brooklyn would not receive another major league sports franchise until the National Basketball Association's New Jersey Nets moved to the borough in 2012.

New York City mayor Robert F. Wagner asked attorney William A. Shea to head up a committee to acquire a new National League team for New York. After pitching to Philadelphia, Cincinnati, and Pittsburgh, Shea realized he was asking a team to do what he couldn't—that was move a team from a market that supported it. Almost immediately the goal was switched from moving franchises to expanding the league. Using contacts in government, he was able to force MLB (by lobbying for the end of MLB's Anti-Trust exemption) to add two American League teams and two National League teams. The New York Mets were eventually added as an expansion team, beginning play in 1962. Ironically, the Yankees' attendance declined slightly in the years immediately following the Dodgers' and Giants' departure, and the Mets consistently drew more fans than the Yankees through the early- to mid- 1970s. The Mets today are often considered "New York City's team" while the Yankees have a wider fanbase, similar to that of football's Dallas Cowboys.

=== The Braves and Athletics move again ===
The Braves and Athletics did not stay in their locations for very long. The Braves, despite success in Milwaukee, moved to Atlanta for 1966 while the Athletics set up shop in Oakland for 1968. Both markets would eventually get replacement teams: the Milwaukee Brewers and Kansas City Royals, respectively. The Braves would not have consistent success in Atlanta until the 1990s, while the A's were intermittently successful.

== Subsequent moves ==
In 1970, the one-year-old Seattle Pilots moved to Milwaukee to become the Brewers.

The other moves for the next several decades involved Washington, D.C. The original Washington Senators moved to the Twin Cities region to become the Minnesota Twins (beginning play as such in 1961), and the expansion Senators that replaced them moved to Arlington, Texas (in the Dallas–Fort Worth region) to become the Texas Rangers (beginning play as such in 1972). The owners of the Giants, White Sox, and Pirates (in the latter's case, as a result of the Pittsburgh drug trials) all threatened to move, though none made good on them; and all three markets to which these teams threatened to move (Toronto, the Tampa Bay Area, and Denver, respectively) would later receive expansion teams of their own.

There were no more moves until 2005, when MLB moved the Montreal Expos to D.C. and renamed them the Washington Nationals.

The most recent move is currently ongoing. After the 2024 season, the Oakland Athletics left for an eventual permanent home in Las Vegas. While their new Las Vegas ballpark is being built (expected to open in 2028), the team is playing as the Athletics (without a geographic identifier) in West Sacramento, California.

Oakland and Montreal are the only cities since 1901 that lost a major league franchise without getting another one. This is not counting the short-lived Federal League of 1914 and 1915; however, all Federal League markets save two—Buffalo and Indianapolis—either had a franchise in one of the two established leagues at the time or got one later. As of 2022, MLB officials have expressed an interest in the return of baseball to Montreal, and the city is a leading candidate for a proposed expansion to 32 teams.

== Economic factors ==
Most moves during this time did not involve a change in ownership. This means that the main economic incentive for the MLB to expand was not large offers from prospective buyers in western cities. The expansion occurred because franchise owners expected higher profits in the other location.

=== Internal factors ===
==== Protection against rival leagues ====
Expansion of MLB to all cities capable of supporting a franchise in the sport is economically beneficial for the league as a whole. This reduces the possibility of the formation of a rival league, a problem that baseball dealt with in its early history. Monopoly control of the sport is essential to many aspects of player contracts, drafts and other parts of the game. Baseball's anti-trust exemption was important in the development and expansion of the league.

==== Media ====
In MLB, all local TV revenue is assigned to the home team. The league has complex revenue sharing rules, but data shows that media revenue was an economic pull factor for the franchise moves. The yearly gains in media revenue associated with the moves are:

- Boston to Milwaukee (−$175,000)
- St. Louis to Baltimore (+$257,000)
- Philadelphia to Kansas City (−$90,000)
- Washington to Minnesota (+$400,000)
- Milwaukee to Atlanta (+$800,000)
- Kansas City to Oakland (+$800,000)
- Seattle to Milwaukee (−$150,000)
- Washington to Texas (no change)

Data is unavailable for the moves of the Dodgers and the Giants. Based on this data, TV revenues influenced the franchise move of Washington, Milwaukee, and Kansas City and perhaps St. Louis. TV revenues have played an important role in roughly half of the moves that have taken place. James Quirk argues that under a TV sharing arrangement similar to the National Football League, or even under a split with visiting teams, the TV lure would be much less of an incentive for moves.

=== External factors ===
The protection of the league from competition and economic benefits of media revenues are direct economic pull factors. Other advancements in the U.S. during this time also had an effect on the ability and desire of teams to move and the league to expand. The expansion of MLB coincided with an increase in the ease of travel by commercial jets, making it easier for players to fly across the continent. This is important given that when Walter O'Malley moved his Dodgers to Los Angeles, the closest team, other than the San Francisco Giants, was in St. Louis.

The expansion of baseball is also accompanied by the increase in popularity of television. Baseball expanded, in large part, because interest in the sport grew leading up to and during the 1950s and 1960s. In home televisions allowed for this increase in popularity and helped make New York's pastime, America's pastime.

== Summary ==
From 1903 to 1952, no major league baseball team moved to a different city. From 1953 to 1969, there were eight moves.

- 1953: Boston Braves moved to Milwaukee
- 1954: St. Louis Browns moved to Baltimore and became the Orioles
- 1955: Philadelphia Athletics moved to Kansas City
- 1958: New York Giants moved to San Francisco; Brooklyn Dodgers moved to Los Angeles
- 1961: Washington Senators moved to Minneapolis–Saint Paul and became the Minnesota Twins; new Washington Senators (replacing the original Senators) and Los Angeles Angels created as expansion teams
- 1962: Houston Colt .45s (later renamed the Astros) and New York Mets (replacing the Dodgers and Giants) created as expansion teams
- 1966: Milwaukee Braves moved to Atlanta
- 1968: Kansas City Athletics moved to Oakland
- 1969: San Diego Padres, Montreal Expos, Kansas City Royals (replacing the Athletics), and Seattle Pilots created as expansion teams

== See also ==
- American League
- National League
- History of baseball in the United States#1972–2013
- Major League Baseball#Relocation and expansion
- Relocation of professional sports teams
