= Walt Goldsby =

American baseball player (1861–1914)

- Outfielder
- Born: December 31, 1861; Marion, Louisiana, U.S.
- Died: January 11, 1914 (aged 52); Dallas, Texas, U.S.
- Batted: Left

MLB debut
- May 29, 1884, for the St. Louis Browns

Last MLB appearance
- October 16, 1888, for the Baltimore Orioles

MLB statistics
- Batting average: .243
- Home runs: 0
- Runs batted in: 23
- Stats at Baseball Reference

Teams
- St. Louis Browns (1884); Washington Nationals (1884); Richmond Virginians (1884); Washington Nationals (1886); Baltimore Orioles (1888)

Walton Hugh Goldsby (December 31, 1861 – January 11, 1914), also spelled Walten Hugh Goldsby, was an American baseball player who played as an outfielder for parts of three seasons in top professional leagues in 1884, 1886, and 1888. He was a member of five different teams during these seasons; the St. Louis Browns, Washington Nationals, Richmond Virginians, and Baltimore Orioles of the American Association, and the Washington Nationals of the National League. During his playing days, his listed height was 5'10.5", and his weight as 165 lbs.

In addition to his major league experience, Goldsby also appeared as a both a player and a manager in minor league baseball, most notably for the Topeka Golden Giants of the Western League in 1887. In 1889, while he was a player-manager for a team in Evansville, Illinois, he suffered partial paralysis during a game; acute rheumatism was diagnosed as a cause. He left baseball a short time later and worked for the railroad.

== Early life ==
Goldsby was born on December 31, 1861, in Marion, Louisiana to Irish immigrants. In 1880, he was living with his widowed mother Dottie, a schoolteacher, as a boarder in a hotel located in Prescott, Arkansas.

== Career ==
He began playing with an amateur baseball club in East St. Louis, Illinois in 1883, and later that year, he began playing professionally with a team in Evansville, Indiana. He continued with the team into the 1884 season when he was signed by the St. Louis Browns of the American Association (AA), and made his Major League Baseball debut on May 29, 1884. He played just five games for the Browns, and was released after collecting four hits in 20 at bats for a .200 batting average. He returned to Evansville, but was soon signed by the Washington Nationals of the AA, and he was playing for the team in the latter part of July 1884. On August 2, the Evening Star opined that the Nationals' outfield, now consisting of Goldsby, Frank Olin, and Willie Murphy, had made a significant improvement. Despite the praise, and good play, he was released from the teams after playing in six games and a .375 batting average. He later appeared in 11 games for the Richmond Virginians, and was released from the team in September. After the AA season had completed, he was again playing for Evansville.

Goldsby played for the Atlanta Atlantas of the Southern League (SL) during the 1885 minor league baseball season. In 93 games played, he hit six home runs, and had a .291 batting average. He began the 1886 baseball season playing for, and managing, the Nashville Americans of the Southern Association. In August, he issued a fine of $25 to pitcher Ed Dundon, who was a deaf-mute; Goldsby feeling that he had intentionally allowed an opposing player to hit a home run. This turned out to be a very unpopular decision among his team members, as well as the local press. On September 2, it was reported that Goldsby was suffering from a bout of malaria. By the middle of September, he was no longer playing for Nashville, and had signed with the Washington Nationals of the National League. With the Nationals, he played in six games and collected just four hits in 22 at bats for a .222 batting average.

Goldsby returned to the minor leagues in 1887, becoming the player-manager of the Topeka Golden Giants of the Western League. He had the best season of his minor league career, batting a .422 average, scored 112 runs, hit 13 doubles, and nine triples. The following season, he continued his role as a player-manager, though he moved to the Birmingham Maroons of the SL. After a meeting of SL officials in New Orleans, it was determined that league would be accepted into the National Agreement and agree to respect the reserve clause. However, the teams were not able to contribute the money necessary to bind the agreement and secure the right to reserve their own players, so many of them decided to take larger offers from other leagues. Goldsby was one of these, and by mid-July, had accepted an offer with the Baltimore Orioles of the AA. He played in 45 games for the Orioles through the remainder of the season, compiled 17 stolen bases, and had a .236 batting average. Though he was listed among the Baltimore players that had been reserved, he never again played in another major league.

After being released by the Orioles in March 1889, he joined the Evansville Hoosiers of the Central Interstate League as their player-manager. On June 12, he suffered a bout of partial-paralysis of his right side. He was diagnosed with acute rheumatism, that had affected his brain. He had been playing for weeks while feeling ill, causing him to suffer anxiety. During the previous season, in a game against the Philadelphia Athletics, he was hit the head with a ball, causing him to lose consciousness. He complained of total memory loss of the day. It was thought that this incident could have played a part in his illness. He wouldn't appear again as a player or manager until he appeared in 15 games for the Memphis Giants of the Southern Association in 1892. Later, 1903, he was employed as an alternate umpire with the SL based in Memphis.

== Post-baseball life ==
After Goldsby's baseball career ended, he returned to Arkansas, and was later married. In 1900, he was living with his brother in Pine Bluff, Arkansas. He is listed as a married man for the last seven years, but his wife was not living in the same household. His occupation was an orderly for a railroad. In 1910, he was working as a machinist for a railroad; he was listed as divorced and living in a St. Louis boarding house.

On January 11, 1914, Goldsby committed suicide in a Dallas, Texas hotel called the "Campbell House", by a self-inflicted shot to the head with a .45 caliber revolver. He had been registered as a resident of Dallas, and left a lengthy suicide note detailing general despondency. He was survived by his brother, and his son Miles, both of whom lived in Harrisburg, Arkansas. He was a member of the St. Louis chapter of the Knights of the Pythias, and the funeral was held in Dallas by a local Knights lodge on January 12. He was interred at Oakland Cemetery in Dallas on January 13.
