= Rule 5 draft =

Player selection process in Major League Baseball

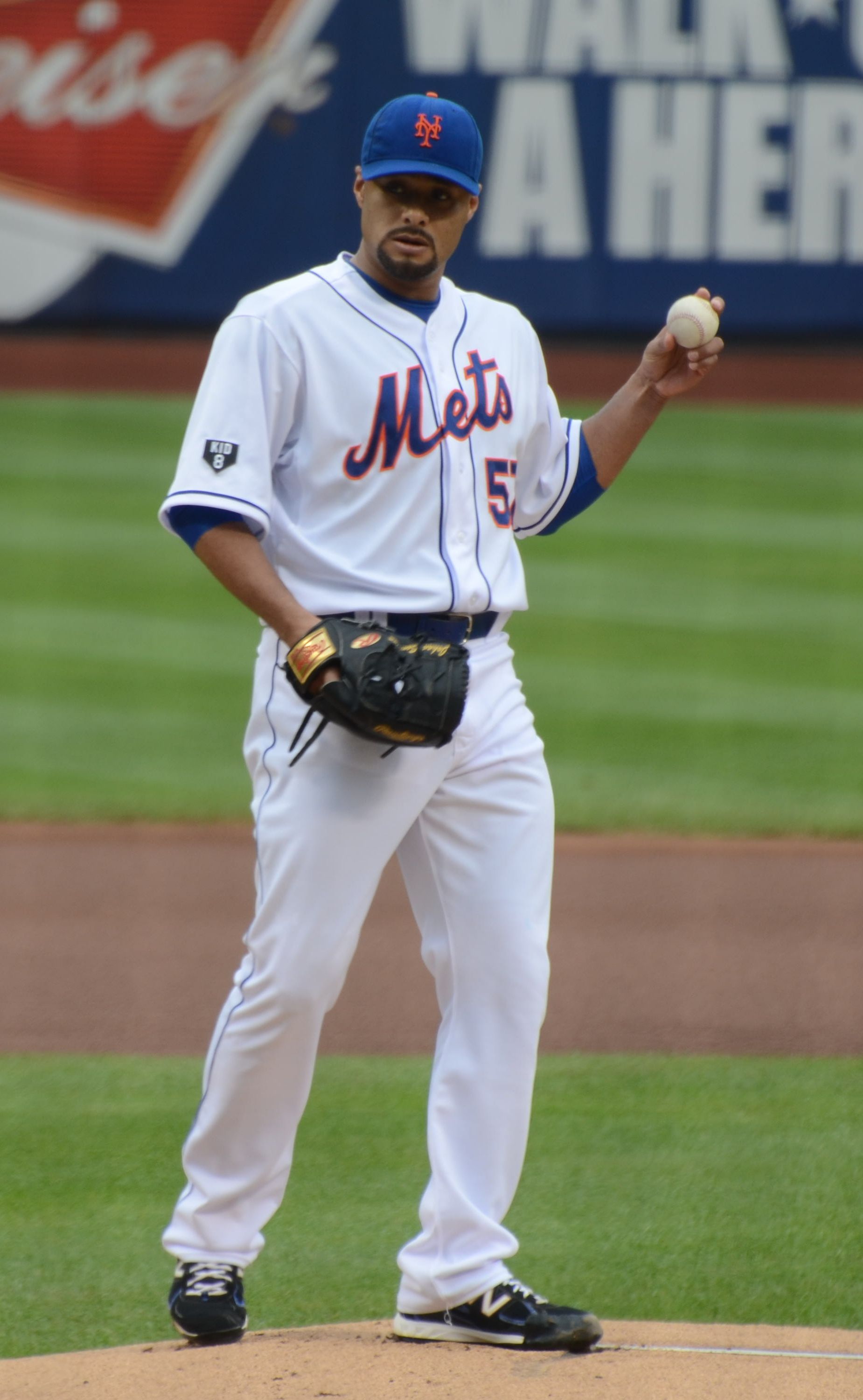
Johan Santana, selected in the Rule 5 draft following the 1999 season, went on to win two Cy Young Awards.

The Rule 5 draft is a Major League Baseball (MLB) player draft that occurs each year in December, at the annual Winter Meeting of general managers. The Rule 5 draft aims to prevent teams from stockpiling too many young players on their minor league affiliate teams when other organizations would be willing to have them play in the major leagues. The Rule 5 draft is named for its place in The Official Professional Baseball Rules Book. The Rule 4 draft—more widely known as the "first-year player draft", "amateur draft", or simply the "MLB draft"—is a distinctly different process by which teams select high school and college players, and takes place annually in July.

The Rule 5 draft has happened every year since 1920. The 2021 MLB lockout led to the postponement of the major league phase of the Rule 5 draft, but the minor league phase proceeded as scheduled.

== History ==
MLB player transactions are governed by The Official Professional Baseball Rules Book, (Note: This document governs MLB's business rules, not playing rules.) within which, Rule 5 governs the "Annual Selection of Players". The first version of what would become known as the Rule 5 draft began in 1892. Picks were originally chosen from independent minor league teams before the farm system developed, with teams compensated financially based on 'level' of the minor league the team was in. Prior to its current incarnation, from 1959 until the creation of the annual amateur Rule 4 draft in 1965, top first-year prospects of teams were exposed to the Rule 5 draft. This was in some ways an outgrowth of the bonus rule that existed from 1946 to 1950 and from 1953 to 1957.

== Description ==
The selection order of the teams is based on each team's win–loss record from the prior regular season, as in the amateur draft, each round starting with the team with the worst record and proceeding in order to the team with the best record. Teams may choose not to select any player with their pick, passing to the next team in the order. Any player selected under Rule 5 is immediately added to his new team's 40-man roster; thus, teams who do not have an available roster spot may not participate in the Rule 5 draft. Players who are not currently on their team's 40-man roster are eligible to be selected in the Rule 5 draft, but only after a standard exemption period has elapsed, per selection eligibility below.

If chosen in the Rule 5 draft, a player must be kept on the selecting team's major league active roster for the entire season that follows the draft—the player may not be optioned or designated to the minors. The selecting team may, at any time, waive the Rule 5 draftee. If a Rule 5 draftee clears waivers by not signing with a new MLB team, he must be offered back to the original team, effectively canceling the Rule 5 draft choice. Once a Rule 5 draftee spends an entire season on his new team's active roster, his status reverts to normal and he may be optioned or designated for assignment.

To prevent the abuse of the Rule 5 draft, the rule also states that the draftee must actually be active for at least 90 days. This keeps teams from drafting players, then placing them on the injured list for the majority of the season. For example, if a Rule 5 draftee was only active for 67 days in his first season with his new club, he must be active for an additional 23 days in his second season to satisfy the Rule 5 requirements.

Any player chosen in the Rule 5 draft may be traded to any team while under the Rule 5 restrictions, but the restrictions transfer to the new team. If the new team does not want to keep the player on its active roster for the season, he must be offered back to the team of which he was a member when chosen in the draft.

=== Selection eligibility ===
Players are eligible for selection in the Rule 5 draft if they are not on their major league organization's 40-man roster and:

- were 18 or younger on the June 5 preceding their signing and this is the fifth Rule 5 draft upcoming; or
- were 19 or older on the June 5 preceding their signing and this is the fourth Rule 5 draft upcoming.

These exemption periods (one year longer than those in effect previously) went into effect as part of a new Collective Bargaining Agreement (CBA) in October 2006. The change took effect immediately, exempting many players from the 2006 Rule 5 draft even though they had been signed in some cases more than four years before the new agreement came into effect. Prior to the rule change, players were exempt from the first two or three Rule 5 drafts held after their signing (regardless of the year they were drafted), rather than from the first three or four Rule 5 drafts after their signing.

There can be exceptions to these rules, however. Players may also be eligible to be selected due to having a previous contract voided and then re-signing with their original signing team within a year. Notable players selected due to this rule include Wei-Chung Wang and Elvis Luciano.

=== Example ===
The Rule 5 draft has opened opportunities for teams to take other teams' top prospects who may not be ready for the major leagues. A prominent example is Johan Santana, a member of the Venezuelan Baseball Hall of Fame, who was chosen in the 1999 Rule 5 draft by the Florida Marlins when the Houston Astros declined to put him on their 40-man roster, and then traded to the Minnesota Twins in a pre-arranged deal. Santana had not played above Class A before being chosen in the Rule 5 draft. The Twins kept Santana on their roster for the 2000 season, despite the pitcher's subpar performance that season (6.49 ERA). After the 2000 season, the Twins had the right to assign Santana to their minor league system, but chose not to do so during the 2001 season. He was briefly assigned to Triple-A at the start of the 2002 season, then returned to the major leagues at the end of May and established himself as one of the best lefthanded starting pitchers in baseball; he went on to win Cy Young Awards in 2004 and 2006.

=== Cost ===
To prevent excessive turnover in the minor league levels, each draftee costs $100,000. If the draftee does not stay on the selecting team's active major league roster all season, the player must be offered back to his original team at half-price ($50,000). Prior to the CBA in effect during 2017–2021, each draftee cost $50,000 and therefore $25,000 to be reacquired by his original team.

=== Minor-league phase ===
Under the 2017–2021 CBA, organizations could also draft players from Double-A or lower to play for their Triple-A affiliates (for $12,000) and could draft players from Class A teams or lower to play for their Double-A affiliates (for $4,000). Starting in 2022, the cost of selecting a player into Triple-A was doubled to $24,000, and the Double-A phase was eliminated.

== Notable Rule 5 draftees ==
=== Hall of Famers ===
- Christy Mathewson—selected by the Cincinnati Reds from the Norfolk Phenoms in the 1900 Rule 5 draft.
- Hack Wilson—selected by the Chicago Cubs from the Toledo Mud Hens in the 1925 Rule 5 draft.
- Roberto Clemente—selected by the Pittsburgh Pirates from the Brooklyn Dodgers as the first pick of the Rule 5 draft of November 22, 1954

=== All-Stars ===
- José Bautista
- George Bell
- Paul Blair†
- Bobby Bonilla
- Everth Cabrera
- Nestor Cortes Jr.
- Alfredo Simón
- Jody Davis
- R. A. Dickey
- Darrell Evans
- Roy Face
- Ferris Fain
- Jason Grilli
- Kelly Gruber
- Josh Hamilton
- Willie Hernández
- Odubel Herrera
- Dave Hollins
- John Hudek†
- Sal Maglie
- Dave May
- Evan Meek
- Mike Morgan
- Omar Narvaez
- Jeff Nelson
- Darren O'Day
- Alexi Ogando†
- Scott Podsednik†
- Ryan Pressly
- Bip Roberts
- Jordan Romano†
- Johan Santana
- Anthony Santander
- Shane Smith
- Joakim Soria
- Manny Trillo†
- Derrick Turnbow
- Dan Uggla
- Fernando Viña
- Shane Victorino

† player was selected in the minor league portion of the Rule 5 draft

=== Drafted, but returned, or traded before start of season ===
- Frank Catalanotto
- Jake Cave
- Cecil Cooper
- Ender Inciarte
- George Kontos
- Javier López
- Mike Myers
- Iván Nova
- Ronny Paulino
- Lance Pendleton
- Ryan Rowland-Smith
- Fernando Viña
- John Wetteland
- Josh Hamilton
- Travis Bergen
- Garrett McDaniels

=== Drafted, then traded to the drafting team, nullifying the draft ===
- R. A. Dickey
- Willy Taveras
- Mitch Williams
- Evan Meek
- Scott Diamond

=== Other notable draftees ===
- Gary Geiger was a three-time Rule 5 draftee in his twelve-year major league career, in each case spending a full season with the team that drafted him. (The Cleveland Indians in 1957, the Atlanta Braves in 1966, and the Houston Astros in 1969.)
- Ricky Williams played in parts of four seasons as a prospect of the Philadelphia Phillies before being taken in the 1998 draft by the Montreal Expos, who flipped him to the Texas Rangers. Williams, that year's Heisman Trophy recipient, however, would never play another professional baseball game, instead turning his focus to football, where he would go 5th overall in the 1999 NFL draft to the New Orleans Saints.
