= List of baseball parks in Toledo, Ohio =

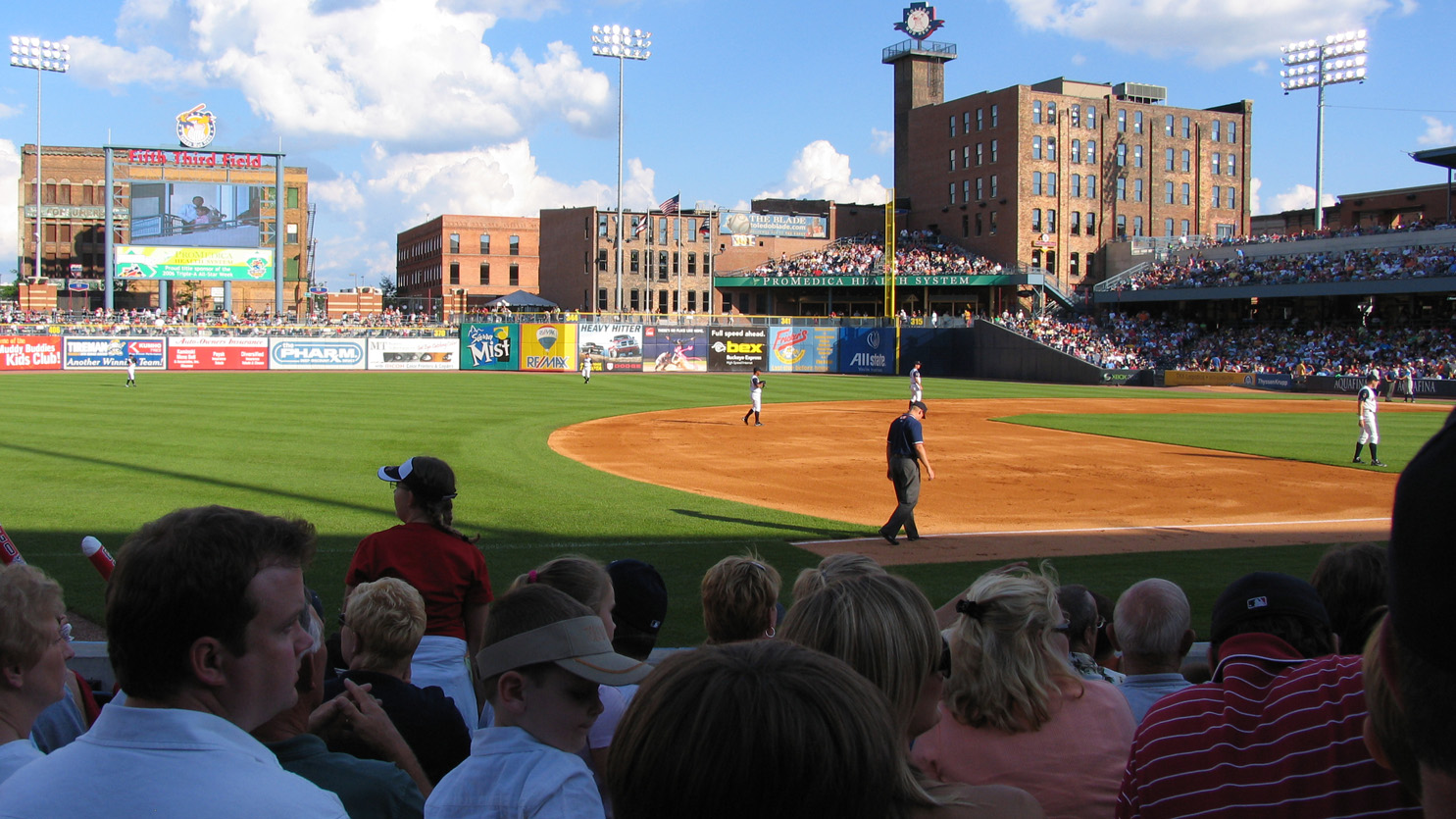
Fifth Third Field

This is a list of venues used for professional baseball in Toledo, Ohio. The information is a synthesis of the information contained in the references listed.

== Baseball parks in Toledo ==
League Park
Home of: Toledo Blue Stockings - Northwestern League (1883); American Association (1884); Western League (1885)
Location: Monroe Street (southwest), 15th Street (northwest), Jefferson Avenue (northeast), 13th Street (southeast); a few blocks northwest of the site of Fifth Third Field.

Tri-State Fairgrounds
Home of: Toledo Blue Stockings - AA (1884) (Saturdays and Sundays only)
Location: Dorr Street, Upton Avenue

Note: The Weber book (p. 21) is the source of this information, which has been repeated in other works. The Husman book states (p. 12) that there is no evidence this site was ever actually used for professional baseball, but only for amateur ball.

Riverside Park
Home of: Toledo Blue Stockings - WL (1885 - Sundays - league folded in June)
Location: North Summit Street, near Ash Street; Maumee River runs southeast of the site

Presque Isle Park
Home of: Toledo Maumees - Tri-State League (1888 through July 3)
Location: Mouth of the Maumee River, "where the Chesapeake and Ohio Railway coal docks are/were sited."

Speranza Park
Home of: Toledo Maumees a.k.a. Black Pirates - TSL (1888 starting July 4); International League (1889); AA (1890)
Location: Triangular block bounded by Cherry Street (northeast), Frederick Street (south), and Franklin Avenue (west).
Currently: Grounds of St. Vincent Mercy Medical Center

Olympic Park
Home of: Toledo Black Pirates - Western League (1892 - league disbanded in July)
Location: Indiana Avenue, Hawley Street, Woodland Avenue; a few blocks east-southeast of Tri-State Fairgrounds

Whitestocking Park
Home of: Toledo White Stockings - WL (1894-1895, transferred to Terre Haute, Indiana on July 1, 1895)
Location: Lagrange Street (west / home plate), Pearl Street (north / left field), Hudson Street (south / right field)

Ewing Street Park
Home of: Toledo White Stockings / Toledo Swamp Angels / Mud Hens - WL (1894-95, transferred to Terre Haute); Inter-State League (1896)
Location: Ewing Street (east), Pinewood Avenue (south - then called Missouri Avenue), Hawley Street (west), Woodland Avenue (north - then called Wisconsin Avenue); about a block east-northeast from Olympic Park site

Note: Weber states that it was "necessary" to have two parks during 1894-95 but does not elaborate.

Bay View Park
Home of: Toledo Swamp Angels / Mud Hens - ISL (1896-1900) Saturdays and Sundays only
Location: Manhattan Boulevard at Summit Street
Currently: Bayview Retirees Golf Course

Armory Park
Home of: Toledo Mud Hens - Inter-State League (1897-1900); Western League (1901); American Association (1902 - July 2, 1909)
Location: Spielbusch Avenue (northwest / third base - later Judge Joseph Flores Avenue); The Armory, and Orange Street (northeast / left field); North Ontario Street (southeast / right field); Beech Street (southwest / first base)
Currently: U. S. District Courthouse

Swayne Field
Home of:

Toledo Mud Hens - AA (July 3, 1909 - 1913, 1916 - 1955) [played in Cleveland during 1914-1915]
Toledo "Soumichers" or "Little Mud Hens", South-Michigan League (1914, took to the road mid-season)

Location: Monroe Street (southwest / first base), Detroit Avenue (southeast / right field), Council Street (northeast / left field) and railroad tracks (northwest / third base).
Currently: shopping center

Lucas County Stadium/Ned Skeldon Stadium
Home of: Toledo Mud Hens - International League (1965-2001)
Location: (Maumee, Ohio) Key Street (west / third base), Ohio Turnpike (I-80, I-90) (north / left field), Michigan Avenue (northeast / center field), Wilderness Drive (east / right field), railroad tracks (south / first base); only Key Street actually runs next to the park; the others are all some distance away.

Fifth Third Field
Home of: Toledo Mud Hens - IL (2002-present)
Location: Washington Street (southwest / first base); North Huron Street (northwest / third base); Monroe Street / Henry Morse Way (northeast / left field); Msgr. Jerome Schmidt Way / North St. Clair Street (southeast / right field).

== See also ==
- Lists of baseball parks

== Sources ==
- The Toledo Baseball Guide of the Mud Hens 1883-1943, Ralph Elliott Lin Weber, 1944.
- Ballparks of North America, Michael Benson, McFarland, 1989.
- Baseball in Toledo, John R. Husman, Arcadia, 2003.
