= Dan Stearns =

American baseball player (1861–1944)

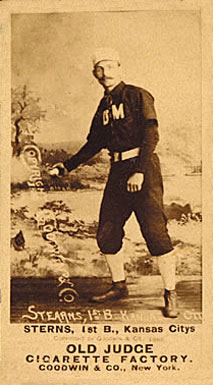
- First baseman
- Born: October 17, 1861; Buffalo, New York, U.S.
- Died: June 28, 1944 (aged 82); Glendale, California, U.S.
- Batted: Left Threw: Right

MLB debut
- August 17, 1880, for the Buffalo Bisons

Last MLB appearance
- October 14, 1889, for the Kansas City Cowboys

MLB statistics
- Batting average: .242
- Home runs: 8
- RBI: 173
- Stats at Baseball Reference

Teams
- Buffalo Bisons (1880); Detroit Wolverines (1881); Cincinnati Red Stockings (AA) (1882); Baltimore Orioles (1883–85); Buffalo Bisons (1885); Kansas City Cowboys (1889)

Daniel Eckford Stearns (October 17, 1861 – June 28, 1944), commonly known as "Ecky" Stearns, was an American Major League Baseball first baseman from 1880-1889. He played for the Buffalo Bisons, Detroit Wolverines, Kansas City Cowboys, Baltimore Orioles, and Cincinnati Red Stockings (AA).

At the start of the 1882 season, clubs playing in the American Association had their players wear non-matching silk uniforms, with a different color and/or pattern corresponding to each position in the field. Accordingly, on Opening Day for the Red Stockings, Stearns wore an unusual candy-striped jersey.

On September 11, 1882, Stearns was involved in a notable milestone, when pitcher Tony Mullane of the Louisville Eclipse pitched the first no-hit game in the history of the American Association against Stearns and his teammates on the Cincinnati Red Stockings, a 2–0 win by Louisville. Stearns made the game's final out by bouncing into a fielder's choice that forced runner Pop Snyder at second base. The Red Stockings had the last laugh, however, ending the year as the AA's inaugural champions.

Unsatisfied with their first-base play in 1882, the Red Stockings signed Long John Reilly of the New York Metropolitans to replace Stearns prior to the 1883 season.

Stearns spent the 1887 season with the Topeka Golden Giants of the Western League, leading that league in hits. That team finished with a dominant record of 90–25, and is sometimes described as the strongest minor league baseball club of the 19th century.

Stearns is also notable as one of the first Jews to play Major League Baseball. His status as such made him popular with Jewish youths who were fans of the game.
