= Indianapolis Hoosiers =

Indianapolis Hoosiers was the name of three major league and at least three minor league baseball clubs based in Indianapolis.

- Indianapolis Hoosiers (American Association), which played in 1884
- Indianapolis Hoosiers (National League), which played from 1887 until 1889
- Indianapolis Hoosiers (Federal League), which played in 1914 and then became the Newark Peppers
- Indianapolis Hoosiers (minor league baseball), which played in the Western League before 1900, in the non-major American League during 1900, and in the Western Association in 1901

== See also ==
- Indiana Hoosiers, athletic teams representing Indiana University
