= Gary Jones (baseball manager) =

American baseball coach (born 1960)

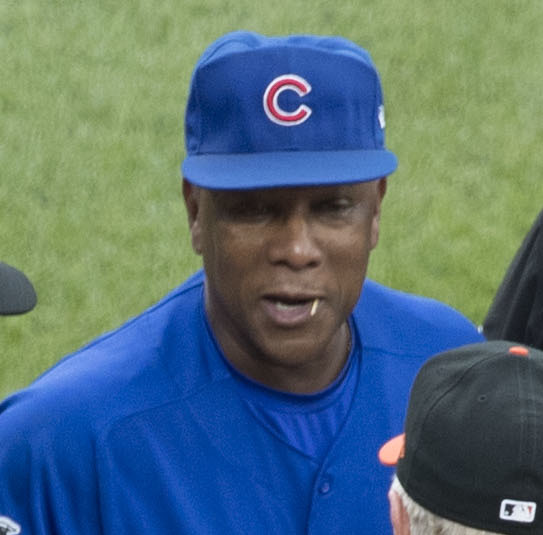
- Jones with the Chicago Cubs in 2017

Toledo Mud Hens – No. 40
- Third base coach
- Born: November 11, 1960 (age 65); Henderson, Texas, U.S.
- Bats: Left Throws: Right
- Stats at Baseball Reference

Teams
- As Coach: Oakland Athletics (1998); Chicago Cubs (2014–2017); Detroit Tigers (2022–2025)

Career highlights and awards
- World Series champion (2016)

Gary Wayne Jones (born November 11, 1960) is an American Major League Baseball coach and a former player and he is currently a manager for the Toledo Mud Hens.

Formerly, Jones was the third-base coach of the Chicago Cubs from 2014 to 2017 and the first-base coach of the Oakland Athletics in 1998. More recently, he was the manager of the Lehigh Valley IronPigs, Triple-A International League affiliate of the Philadelphia Phillies (2018–2019, 2021).

== Career ==
The Cubs originally signed Jones as a 21-year-old free agent infielder in 1982 out of the University of Arkansas. Jones played for seven years in the Cubs and Athletics farm systems, including two seasons with the Triple-A Tacoma Tigers, and batted .283 with nine home runs in 899 minor league games between 1982 and 1989. He batted left-handed, threw right-handed, stood 5 feet 9 inches (1.75 m) tall and weighed 162 pounds (73 kg).

After retiring as a player, he was a manager in the Oakland, Boston Red Sox, and San Diego Padres organizations. From 1990 to 1997, 1999–2001 and 2003–06, Jones led teams in the International League, Pacific Coast League, Southern League, Midwest League, and Arizona Fall League. He managed the Madison Muskies, Huntsville Stars, Edmonton Trappers, Pawtucket Red Sox, Fort Wayne Wizards and Mobile BayBears. He served the Red Sox as coordinator of minor league instruction in 2002.

Jones led the Stars to the Southern League championship in 1994 and the Trappers to back-to-back Pacific Coast League championships in 1996 and 1997. He also won Manager-of-the-Year Awards in 1991 (Madison), 1994 (Huntsville), 1996 and 1997 (both with Edmonton). In his first season with Lehigh Valley, he led the 2018 IronPigs to an 84–56 win–loss record and the International League North Division championship, although his team was eliminated in the opening round of the Governors' Cup playoffs. Through 2018, his career mark as a minor league manager was 1,124–1,028 (.522).

Prior to his appointment to the 2014 coaching staff of then-Cub manager Rick Renteria, Jones spent seven years as the roving minor league infield instructor for the San Diego Padres, where Renteria had been a Major League coach. He was retained when Joe Maddon replaced Renteria as manager in October 2014 for the 2015 season, and was the third-base coach for the 2016 Cubs' National League and World Series championship team.

In December 2021, Jones was hired to manage the Toledo Mud Hens, the Detroit Tigers Triple-A team. On January 27, 2022, Jones was named first base coach for the Tigers' major league team, replacing Kimera Bartee who died suddenly in late 2021.

On May 12th 2026 Gary Jones was named the new manager of the Toledo Mud Hens, replacing interim manager Mike Hessman.

Sporting positions
Preceded by Casey Parsons	Huntsville Stars manager 1994	Succeeded by Dick Scott
Preceded by Sal Rende	Edmonton Trappers manager 1995–1997	Succeeded by Mike Quade
Preceded by Brad Fischer	Oakland Athletics first base coach 1998	Succeeded by Thad Bosley
Preceded by Ken Macha	Pawtucket Red Sox manager 1999–2001	Succeeded by Buddy Bailey
Preceded by Craig Colbert	Mobile BayBears manager 2004–2006	Succeeded by Brett Butler
Preceded by David Bell	Chicago Cubs third base coach 2014–2017	Succeeded by Brian Butterfield
Preceded by Dusty Wathan	Lehigh Valley IronPigs manager 2018–2021	Succeeded by Anthony Contreras
Preceded by Kimera Bartee	Detroit Tigers first base coach 2022–	Succeeded by Incumbent
