= Topeka Golden Giants (1887) =

- 1887; Topeka, Kansas

Minor league affiliations
- Previous classes: Pre-classification
- League: Western League

Major league affiliations
- Previous teams: Independent

Minor league titles
- League titles: 1887

Team data
- Previous names: Golden Giants

The Topeka Golden Giants, also known as Goldsby's Golden Giants, was a minor league baseball team located in Topeka, Kansas. The team, which lasted for just one season, played in the Western League.

The Golden Giants posted a 90-25 record (.783) in their one season of operation, winning the Western League title by 15 games over the second-place Lincoln Tree-Planters. On April 10, 1887, the Golden Giants also won an exhibition game from the defending World Series champions, the St. Louis Browns (the present-day Cardinals), by a score of 12-9.

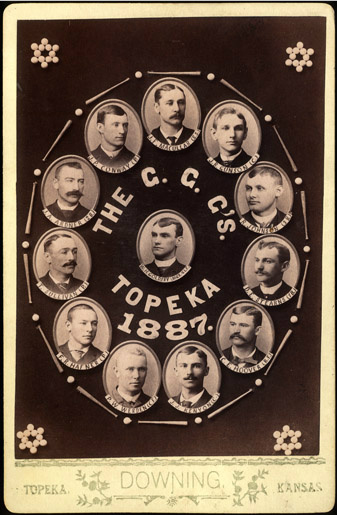
1887 team photo

== Notable players ==
The Western League of that era is classified as a minor league circuit, but the Golden Giants' players had significant major league experience. The roster included the player-manager Walt Goldsby, an outfielder who played in the majors in 1886 and returned to the majors for the 1888 season (with the Baltimore Orioles).

First baseman Dan Stearns led the league in hits, and Jimmy Macullar led the league in batting average. Both Stearns and Macullar had previously played for the Baltimore Orioles through 1885, and had also teamed up on the championship 1882 Cincinnati Red Stockings.

A number of other players had major league experience including: outfielder Bug Holliday, who led the league in home runs; pitcher Tom Sullivan, who led the league in wins with 36; Jim Conway; Perry Werden; Joe Gunson; Joe "Old Hoss" Ardner; and Buster Hoover.
