= Gene Cook =

American politician (1932–2002)

No. 88
- Position: End

Personal information
- Born: January 11, 1932; Greenfield, Tennessee, U.S.
- Died: February 14, 2002 (aged 70); Toledo, Ohio, U.S.
- Listed height: 6 ft 3 in (1.91 m)
- Listed weight: 215 lb (98 kg)

Career information
- College: Toledo (1954–1957)
- NFL draft: 1958: 13th round, 147th overall pick

Career history
- Cleveland Browns (1959)*; Detroit Lions (1959)
- * Offseason or practice squad member only

Career NFL statistics
- Receptions: 1
- Receiving yards: 43
- Stats at Pro Football Reference

Gene Cook (January 11, 1932 (Note: Cook's football records list his date of birth as January 11, 1934. Later sources give his birth year as 1932.) – February 14, 2002) was an American player in the National Football League (NFL), an honored executive in minor league baseball, and a long-time elected official in Toledo, Ohio.

Cook is a member of the International League Hall of Fame.

== Football career ==
Cook played collegiately for the University of Toledo. He was drafted 147th overall in the 13th round of the 1958 NFL draft by the Green Bay Packers. Cook was briefly a wide receiver for the Detroit Lions, recording one reception during the 1959 NFL season. He later played semi-professional ball for the Toledo Tornadoes.

=== Pro statistics ===
| Season | GP | Receiving | | | | | | |
| Season | GP | Rec | Yds | Y/R | TD | Lng | R/G | Y/G |
|---|---|---|---|---|---|---|---|---|
| 1959 | 1 | 1 | 43 | 43.0 | 0 | 43 | 1.0 | 43.0 |
| Career | 1 | 1 | 43 | 43.0 | 0 | 43 | 1.0 | 43.0 |

== Political career ==
Cook was elected to the Toledo City Council in 1967. Cook served continuously in elected office until his retirement in 1997. He served 13 years as vice mayor and three years as city council president. At the time of his death in 2002, his tenure was the longest in the history of the Toledo City Council.

== Minor League Baseball executive ==
Cook served as the general manager of the minor league baseball Toledo Mud Hens of the International League from 1978 to 1998. He was the team's executive vice president from 1998 to 2002. He was named the International League's Executive of the Year in 1980.

Under Cook's management, the average attendance at Mud Hens games would increase almost threefold. Much of this was due to inventive marketing. In his most well-known move, Cook sent a Mud Hens uniform to the fictional character Cpl. Max Klinger of the television show M*A*S*H, played by actor Jamie Farr, a Toledo native. Thereafter, mentions of the Mud Hens were frequently incorporated into the show's scripts, and the team gained nationwide attention.

Cook was posthumously elected to the International League Hall of Fame in 2008. The number 1 was retired by the Mud Hens in his honor.

== Personal life ==
Cook was married to his wife, Marion, for 45 years. They had two sons, Gary and John, and a daughter, Shelly (Straube).

Cook died in February 2002 after a brief illness.
