= Mike Hessman =

American baseball player (born 1978)

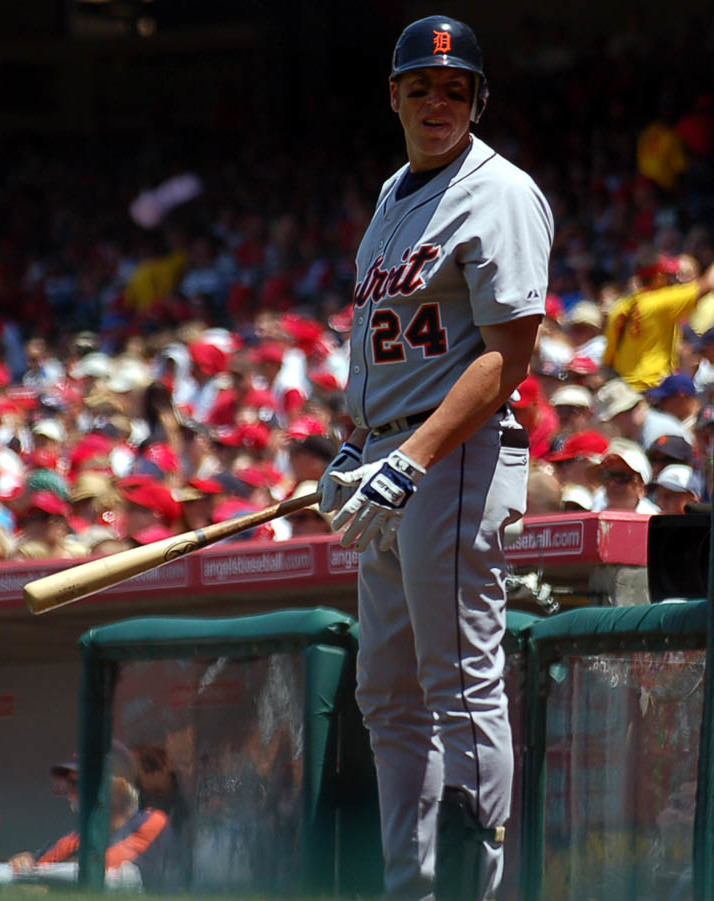
- Hessman with the Detroit Tigers in 2007
- First baseman / Third baseman
- Born: March 5, 1978 (age 48); Fountain Valley, California, U.S.
- Batted: Right Threw: Right

Professional debut
- MLB: August 22, 2003, for the Atlanta Braves
- NPB: April 12, 2011, for the Orix Buffaloes

Last appearance
- MLB: October 3, 2010, for the New York Mets
- NPB: August 2, 2011, for the Orix Buffaloes

MLB statistics
- Batting average: .188
- Home runs: 14
- Runs batted in: 33

NPB statistics
- Batting average: .192
- Home runs: 6
- Runs batted in: 14
- Stats at Baseball Reference

Teams
- As player: Atlanta Braves (2003–2004); Detroit Tigers (2007–2008); New York Mets (2010); Orix Buffaloes (2011); As coach: Detroit Tigers (2021–2022)

Career highlights and awards
- International League MVP (2007); 2x Governors Cup champion (2005, 2006); Toledo Mud Hens #27 retired; MiLB records: 433 career home runs; International League records: 259 career home runs

Member of the International League

Baseball Hall of Fame
- Induction: 2018
Medals
Men's baseball
Representing United States
Olympic Games
Bronze medal – third place	2008 Beijing	Team

Michael Steven Hessman (born March 5, 1978) is an American former professional baseball first baseman and third baseman. He is currently a hitting coach for the Toledo Mud Hens. He played in Major League Baseball (MLB) for the Atlanta Braves, Detroit Tigers, and New York Mets, and in Nippon Professional Baseball (NPB) for the Orix Buffaloes. Hessman served as an interim manager for the Toledo Mud Hens for six games in the 2026 season.

Hessman holds the all-time record for International League home runs, when he hit his 259th on June 30, 2014, breaking Ollie Carnegie's record set in 1945. In 2015, he broke Buzz Arlett's record for the most career minor league home runs, hitting his 433rd on August 3, 2015. In 2018, Hessman was inducted into the International League Hall of Fame for his accomplishments and the Toledo Mud Hens where he played a majority of his professional career retired his number 27.

== Professional career ==
Hessman was originally drafted out of Mater Dei High School in the 15th round (452nd overall) by the Atlanta Braves in the 1996 MLB draft. He spent eight years in the Braves organization before making his Major League debut on August 22, 2003. His first major league hit was a pinch-hit home run on August 26, 2003, off New York Mets pitcher Mike Stanton.

Hessman signed a minor league contract with the Detroit Tigers on January 7, 2005. He played for the Tigers' Triple-A affiliate, the Toledo Mud Hens, for the whole season, and helped them win the International League championship for the first time in 38 years. Hessman batted .214 with 28 home runs and 74 RBI. He spent the entire 2006 season with the Mud Hens, contributing to the Mud Hens' second consecutive Governors' Cup. Though he hit 24 home runs that season, he batted just .165.

Hessman played 117 games for the Mud Hens in 2007, and hit .254 with 31 home runs and 101 RBI. On June 1, he hit his 68th career home run with the Mud Hens, breaking Erve Beck's 107-year old franchise record. Hessman also appeared in 17 games with the Tigers in 2007, hitting .235 with 4 home runs and 12 RBI. On August 28, 2007, Hessman was named the International League Most Valuable Player, and joined Phil Hiatt (1996), Tim Teufel (1983), and Joe Lis (1976) as the only Mud Hens to win the award.

Hessman began the 2008 season with Toledo. On July 16, 2008, he was named to the United States national baseball team for the 2008 Summer Olympics. Despite missing an entire month of the minor league season, Hessman hit 34 home runs for the Mud Hens in 2008. He also appeared in 12 games for the Tigers, and hit .296 with five home runs and seven RBI.

On September 4, 2009, Hessman played all nine positions while with the Mud Hens. He started at catcher and ended as the pitcher, blowing the save and taking the loss. In total, he hit .217 with 23 home runs and 77 RBI in 2009, and became a free agent at the end of the season.

On December 8, 2009, Hessman signed a minor league deal with the New York Mets. The Mets assigned Hessman to the Triple-A Buffalo Bisons, where he hit .274 with 18 home runs and 58 RBI in 64 games. He also appeared in 32 games for the Mets in 2010, mostly as a pinch-hitter, and batted .127 with one home run and six RBI.

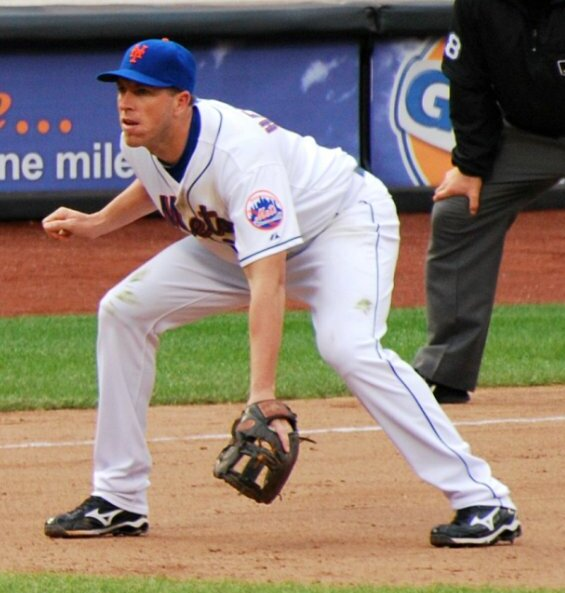
Hessman with the Mets in 2010

On November 10, 2010, Hessman was outrighted by the Mets, but refused the assignment and became a free agent. Hessman signed with the Orix Buffaloes of Nippon Professional Baseball for the 2011 season. He appeared in 48 games for Orix, batting .192 with 6 home runs and 14 RBI. In 2012, Hessman played with the Oklahoma City RedHawks, Triple-A affiliate of the Houston Astros, and hit .231 with 35 home runs and 78 RBI in 123 games.

In late November 2012, the Cincinnati Reds signed Hessman to a minor league deal. He was assigned to the Triple-A Louisville Bats, and played the entire 2013 season with the team, batting .240 with 25 home runs and 56 RBI. Hessman rejoined the Tigers organization in late 2013, and on June 30, 2014, while playing with Toledo, hit his 259th International League home run, setting the career record for that league. Hessman hit .248 in 116 games with Toledo that season, along with 28 home runs and 64 RBI. In the offseason, he played in 14 games for the Tigres de Aragua of the Venezuelan Winter League, as well as 6 games for the Tomateros de Culiacán of the Mexican Pacific Winter League.

On August 3, 2015, while playing for the Mud Hens, Hessman hit his 433rd career home run – a grand slam – off Dustin McGowan of the Lehigh Valley IronPigs, setting a new minor league baseball record for the most home runs in a career, surpassing the 78-year-old record set by Buzz Arlett of the Oakland Oaks in 1937. Hessman is one of only six players in history to hit over 400 home runs in the minor leagues.

On November 28, 2015, Hessman announced his retirement.

== Coaching career ==
On December 3, 2015, less than a month after announcing his retirement from professional baseball, Hessman was named the hitting coach for the Low-A Connecticut Tigers for the 2016 season. He was named the hitting coach for the Single-A West Michigan Whitecaps for the 2017 season, and coached the Mesa Solar Sox of the Arizona Fall League after the regular season. In 2018, Hessman was the hitting coach for the Erie SeaWolves. Hessman served as a hitting coach for the Toledo Mud Hens beginning with the 2019 season. On June 12, 2021, Hessman was promoted to assistant hitting coach for the Detroit Tigers. Hessman went back to being the hitting coach for the Toledo Mud Hens in the beginning of the 2023 season. On May 5, 2026, Hessman will serve as the Toledo Mud Hens interim manager after the Tigers fire Gabe Alvarez as the Mud Hens manager due to a violation of club policy. Hessman had a 3–3 record as the Toledo Mud Hens interim manager Gary Jones will be the Toledo Mud Hens new manager replacing interim manager Hessman starting May 12, 2026.
