= The Official Professional Baseball Rules Book =

Business rules for Major League Baseball

The Official Professional Baseball Rules Book governs all aspects of the game of Major League Baseball beyond what happens on the field of play. There are a number of sources for these rules, but they all ultimately are sanctioned by the Office of the Commissioner of Baseball. Examples of these rules are the Rule 5 draft (so-named for the applicable section of the rule book) and the injured list. Other examples include:

- the 5/10 Rule whereby players who have been with a club for 5 consecutive years and have been a major league player for 10 years cannot be traded without their consent.
- the roster list rules (active and expanded rosters) which also determines who is eligible to play for a team in the playoffs and World Series
- tie-breaking rules for deciding which teams go to the playoffs
- implementing/enforcing the expanded playing rules issued to umpires which goes into much greater detail than the official baseball rules of play. These rules are described in the Umpire's Manual.

== Rules Book ==
The Official Professional Baseball Rules Book is organized into the following sections:

- Major League Constitution
- Major League Rules
- Professional Baseball Agreement
- Basic Agreement

== Major League Rules ==
The below sections enumerate the numbered Major League Rules, both before and after Major League Baseball reorganized the minor leagues in advance of the 2021 season, as multiple rules were changed at that time. With the elimination of one-game playoffs in 2022, the tiebreaker rules were significantly modified, since all ties are now resolved by formula. The revised tiebreaker rules appear in the 2024 edition described below.

As most rules do not state what the penalty is for a violation, broad discretion is granted to the Commissioner of Baseball via Rule 50, "Enforcement of Major League Rules", which specifies "action consistent with the commissioner’s powers under the Major League Constitution".

The Major League Rules begin with a note stating that whenever a provision of any of its rules conflicts with a provision in the Basic Agreement (collective bargaining agreement) negotiated with the Major League Baseball Players Association, the provision in the Basic Agreement "shall in all respects control".

=== 2019 edition ===
1. Circuits
2. Player Limits and Reserve Lists
3. Eligibility to Sign Contracts, Contract Terms and Contract Tenders
4. First Year Player Draft
5. Annual Selection of Players (known as the Rule 5 draft)
6. Selected Players
7. Termination of Player-Club Relation
8. Major League Unconditional Release
9. Assignment of Player Contracts
10. Major League Waivers
11. Optional Agreements
12. Transfer Agreements
13. Suspended Players
14. Retired Players
15. Restricted, Disqualified and Ineligible Lists
16. Reinstatement of Players
17. Player Salaries (governed by the Basic Agreement)
18. Playing Otherwise than for Club
19. Umpires and Official scorers
20. Conflicting Interests
21. Misconduct
  - a) Misconduct in Playing Baseball (throwing games)
  - b) Gift for Defeating Competing Club
  - c) Gifts to Umpires
  - d) Gambling
    1. Betting on other baseball teams (1 year ineligible)
    2. Betting on own team (permanently ineligible)
    3. Using an illegal bookmaker (Commissioner decides penalty)
  - e) Violence or Misconduct (judgement of Commissioner)
  - f) Other Misconduct
  - g) No Discrimination
  - h) Rule to be kept posted (in English and Spanish in every clubhouse)
22. Claim Presentation
23. Holidays
24. Suspended Personnel
25. Uniform Playing Rules
  - a) Official Baseball Rules
  - b) Playing Rules Committee
  - c) Duties of Playing Rules Committee
  - d) Official Scoring Rules Committee
  - e) Duties of Official Scoring Rules Committee
  - f) Copyright and Publication
26. Gate Receipts
27. reserved
28. Voting
29. Major League Disaster Plan
30. Finances
31. Bulletins
32. Schedules (to be issued by commissioner)
33. Qualification for Post-Season Series
  - a) Division Champions
  - b) Wild Card
  - c) Tie-Breaking Procedures
34. Post-Season Series
  - a) Wild Card Game
  - b) Division Series
  - c) League Championship Series
  - d) World Series
35. Post-Season Supervision by the Commissioner
36. Pennant and Memento
37. Post-Season Schedule
38. Post-Season Series Termination
39. Post-Season Playing Rules (use home team's rules)
40. Players Eligible for Post-Season
41. reserved
42. Post-Season Expenses
43. Post-Season Playing Grounds
44. Post-Season Admissions
45. Division of Post-Season Receipts
46. Bonus Forbidden
47. Exhibition Games
48. Obligations of Participants
49. reserved
50. Enforcement of Major League Rules
51. Classification of Minor Leagues
52. Major and Minor League Territorial Rights
53. Minor League Expansion, Contraction, Relocation and Reclassification
54. Regulation of Minor League Franchises
55. Minor League Free Agency
56. Standard Player Development Contract
57. Travel Standards for Minor League Clubs
58. Standards for Minor League Playing Facilities
59. Lien on Territory
60. Definitions
  - a) Major League
  - b) Major League Club
  - c) Major League Player
  - d) Minor League Association
  - e) Minor League
  - f) Minor League Club
  - g) Club
  - h) Minor League Player
  - i) First-Year Player
  - j) Commissioner
  - k) President of a Minor League Association
  - l) Major League Reserve List
  - m) Minor League Reserve List
  - n) Major League Active List
  - o) Minor League Active List
  - p) Championship Season
  - q) Player Development Contract (PDC)
  - r) Independent Minor League Club
  - s) Inactive Lists
  - t) Winter League
  - u) Major League Trade Deadline

The Rules are followed by an Acceptance; "The foregoing ... have been duly accepted by the Major League Clubs and the Leagues of the National Association."

There are then Attachments to the Rules (numbers refer back to Rule # above):

- 3—Minor League Uniform Player Contract
- 12—Notice to Player of Release or Transfer
- 52—Major and Minor League Territories
- 54—Standard Minor League Financial Disclosure
- 56—Standard Form Letter Establishing Player Development Contract
- 58—Minor League Facility Standards and Compliance Inspection Procedures

=== 2021 edition ===
1. Reserve Lists
2. Player Limits
3. Eligibility to Sign Contracts, Contract Terms and Contract Tenders
4. First Year Player Draft
5. Annual Selection of Players (known as the Rule 5 draft)
6. Assignment of Player Contracts
7. Optional Agreements
8. Major League Waivers
9. Termination of Player-Club Relation
10. Bulletins
11. Player Salaries (governed by the Basic Agreement)
12. Playing Otherwise than for Club
13. Claim Presentation
14. Suspended Personnel
15. Umpires
16. Official scorers
17. Uniform Playing Rules
  - a) Official Baseball Rules
  - b) Playing Rules Committee
  - c) Duties of Playing Rules Committee
  - d) Official Scoring Rules Committee
  - e) Duties of Official Scoring Rules Committee
  - f) Copyright and Publication
18. Schedules
  - a) Major Leagues (to be issued by commissioner)
  - b) Minor Leagues (per Minor League Guidelines)
19. Major League Disaster Plan
20. Conflicting Interests
21. Misconduct
  - a) Misconduct in Playing Baseball (throwing games)
  - b) Gift for Defeating Competing Club
  - c) Gifts to Umpires
  - d) Gambling
    1. Betting on other baseball teams (1 year ineligible)
    2. Betting on own team (permanently ineligible)
    3. Using an illegal bookmaker (Commissioner decides penalty)
  - e) Violence or Misconduct (judgement of Commissioner)
  - f) Other Misconduct
  - g) No Discrimination
  - h) Rule to be kept posted (in English and Spanish in every clubhouse)
22. Circuits
23. Gate Receipts
24. reserved
25. Finances
26. Major and Minor League Territorial Rights
27. Classification of Minor Leagues
  - actual content is "Standards For Minor League Playing Facilities"
28. reserved
29. reserved
30. reserved
31. reserved
32. reserved
33. Lien on Territory
34. Qualification for Post-Season Series
  - a) Division Champions
  - b) Wild Card
  - c) Tie-Breaking Procedures
35. Post-Season Series
  - a) Wild Card Game
  - b) Division Series
  - c) League Championship Series
  - d) World Series
36. Post-Season Supervision by the Commissioner
37. Pennant and Memento
38. Post-Season Schedule
39. Post-Season Series Termination
40. Post-Season Playing Rules (use home team's rules)
41. Players Eligible for Post-Season
42. Post-Season Expenses
43. Post-Season Playing Grounds
44. Post-Season Admissions
45. Division of Post-Season Receipts
46. Bonus Forbidden
47. Exhibition Games
48. Obligations of Participants
49. Holidays
50. Enforcement of Major League Rules

The Rules are followed by an Acceptance; "The foregoing ... have been duly accepted by the Major League Clubs."

There are then Attachments to the Rules (numbers refer back to Rule # above):

- 3—Minor League Uniform Player Contract
- 12—Notice to Player of Release or Transfer
- 26—Major and Minor League Territories

=== 2024 edition ===
At the top of page 1, a bolded, fully capitalized statement indicates that where the rules conflict with the currently effective basic agreement with the Major League Baseball Players Association, the basic agreement controls.

1. Reserve Lists
2. Player Limits
3. Eligibility to Sign Contract, Contract Terms and Contract Tenders
4. First-Year Player Draft
5. Annual Selection of Players (known as the Rule 5 draft)
6. Assignment of Player Contracts
7. Optional Agreements
8. Major League Waivers
9. Termination of Player-Club Relation
10. Bulletins
11. Player Salaries
12. Playing Otherwise Than for Club
13. Claim Presentation
14. Suspended Personnel
15. Umpires
16. Official scorers
17. Uniform Playing Rules
  - a) Playing Rules
  - b) Scoring Rules
  - c) Copyright and Publication
18. Schedules
  - a) Major Leagues
  - b) Minor Leagues
19. Major League Disaster Plan
20. Conflicting Interests
21. Misconduct
  - a) Misconduct in Playing Baseball
  - b) Gift for Defeating Competing Club
  - c) Gifts to Umpires
  - d) Gambling
  - e) Violence or Misconduct
  - f) Other Misconduct
  - g) No Discrimination
  - h) Rule to be Kept Posted
22. Circuits
23. Gate Receipts
24. Reserved
25. Finances
26. Major and Minor League Territorial Rights
27. Standards for Minor League Playing Facilities
28. Reserved
29. Reserved
30. Reserved
31. Reserved
32. Reserved
33. Lien on Territory
34. Qualification for Postseason Series
  - a) Division Champions
  - b) Wild Cards
  - c) Tie-Breaking Procedures
  - d) Order of Application of Tie-Breaking Procedures
35. Postseason Format
  - a) Qualifications for Postseason
  - b) Postseason League Seedings
  - c) Wild Card Series
  - d) Division Series
  - e) League Championship Series
  - f) World Series
36. Postseason Supervision by the Commissioner
37. Pennant and Memento
38. Postseason Schedule
39. Postseason Series Termination
40. Postseason Playing Rules
41. Players Eligible for Postseason
42. Postseason Expenses
43. Postseason Playing Grounds
44. Postseason Admissions
45. Division of Postseason Receipts
46. Bonus Forbidden
47. Exhibition Games
48. Obligations of Participants
49. Holidays
50. Enforcement of Major League Rules

The rules are followed by an Acceptance stating, "The foregoing Major League Rules... have been duly accepted by the Major League Clubs."

There are then numbered Attachments to the rules (numbers refer back to rule number above):

- 3—Dominican Summer League Uniform Player Contract
- 12—Notice to Player of Release or Transfer
- 26—Major and Minor League Territories
