= Toledo Mud Hens =

- (1896-1914, 1916–1952, 1965–present); Toledo, Ohio

Team logo	Cap insignia

Minor league affiliations
- Class: Triple-A (1965–present)
- Previous classes: Triple-A (1946–1952); Double-A (1912–1913, 1916–1945); Class A (1901, 1903–1911); Class B (1896–1900); Class C (1896, 1914); Independent (1902)
- League: International League (1965–present)
- Division: West Division
- Previous leagues: American Association (1902–1913, 1916–1952); Southern Michigan League (1914); Western Association (1901); Interstate League (1896–1900)

Major league affiliations
- Team: Detroit Tigers (1987–present)
- Previous teams: Since 1965: Minnesota Twins (1978–1986); Cleveland Indians (1976–1977); Philadelphia Phillies (1974–1975); Detroit Tigers (1967–1973); New York Yankees (1965–1966)

Minor league titles
- Class titles (0): Since 1965: None
- League titles (6): Since 1896: 1896; 1897; 1927; 1968; 2005; 2006
- Division titles (7): Since 1965: 1967; 2002; 2005; 2006; 2007; 2018; 2021

Team data
- Name: Toledo Mud Hens
- Previous names: Toledo Iron Men (1916–1918); Toledo Swamp Angels (1901)
- Colors: Navy, red, white, gold
- Mascots: Muddy and Muddonna
- Ballpark: Fifth Third Field (2002–present)
- Previous parks: Ned Skeldon Stadium (1965–2001)
- Owner(s)/ Operator(s): Toledo Mud Hens Baseball Club (a non-profit corporation)
- General manager: Erik Ibsen
- Manager: Gary Jones
- Website: milb.com/toledo

The Toledo Mud Hens are a Minor League Baseball team of the International League and the Triple-A affiliate of the Detroit Tigers. They are located in Toledo, Ohio, and play their home games at Fifth Third Field. A baseball team nicknamed the Mud Hens has played in Toledo for most seasons since 1896, including a 50-year history as a member of the now-defunct American Association. The current franchise was established in 1965, joining the International League; this league was called the Triple-A East for the 2021 season.

== Background ==
Professional baseball had been played off and on in Toledo since 1883, and the Mud Hens era began in 1896 with the "Swamp Angels," who played in the Interstate League. They played in Bay View Park, which was outside the Toledo city limits and therefore not covered by the city's blue laws. The park was located near marshland inhabited by American coots, also known as "mud hens." For this reason, the local press soon dubbed the team the "Mud Hens"—a nickname that has stuck to Toledo baseball teams for all but a few years since. The name "Mud Hens" became permanent in 1965. After only one season, the team moved to Armory Park.

== History ==
=== 1896–1914 ===
A Mud Hens team played in the Interstate League from 1896 through 1900, then a Toledo team known as the Swamp Angels played in the Western Association in 1901, followed by a Mud Hens team in the American Association from 1902 through 1913. The American Association Mud Hens moved to League Park in Cleveland in 1914 and became the Cleveland Bearcats, playing in Cleveland for two seasons. During the 1914 season, a Class C Mud Hens team played in the Southern Michigan League. No Toledo team was fielded in 1915.

=== 1916–1952 ===
The team resumed play in the American Association in 1916 as the Iron Men, a nickname they used through 1918. The Mud Hens name returned in 1919, and the team competed in the American Association until 1952.

Mid-season in 1952, team owner Danny Menendez moved the Mud Hens to Charleston, West Virginia, where they competed as the Charleston Senators through 1960. Toledo fielded a replacement franchise in the American Association from 1953 to 1955, the Toledo Sox, which was the former Milwaukee Brewers minor-league team. That franchise subsequently moved to Wichita, Kansas, for the 1956 season, where it competed as the Wichita Braves through 1958.

=== 1965–present ===
In 1965, the Richmond Virginians franchise of the International League moved to Toledo and became the current incarnation of the Mud Hens. They were based in Maumee, Ohio, at the converted Fort Miami Fairgrounds. The local ownership group led by Ned Skeldon signed with the New York Yankees to be its top farm team.

In 1967, the Detroit Tigers replaced the Yankees as their major league affiliate. That year, the team was third in the league but claimed the Governors' Cup via the four-team playoff. The next year, the team won a record 83 games and the league pennant but failed to repeat as Cup winners. The team was affiliated with Detroit through 1973. In 1974 and 1975, the Philadelphia Phillies affiliated with the Mud Hens, followed by two years affiliated with the Cleveland Indians. All four seasons were losing seasons.

The Minnesota Twins took over as the team's major league affiliate in 1978 and brought in Gene Cook as general manager, who was good at promoting the team, particularly as a family event. Cook also got Jamie Farr to incorporate the Mud Hens in Farr's M*A*S*H character's background. The Twins affiliation lasted through the 1986 season. The Mud Hens resumed their affiliation with the Tigers in 1987 and have remained in the Detroit organization since then.

In conjunction with Major League Baseball's restructuring of Minor League Baseball in 2021, the Mud Hens were organized into the Triple-A East. Toledo won the Midwestern Division title by ending the season in first place with a 69–51 record. No playoffs were held to determine a league champion; instead, the team with the best regular-season record was declared the winner. However, 10 games that had been postponed from the start of the season were reinserted into the schedule as a postseason tournament called the Triple-A Final Stretch in which all 30 Triple-A clubs competed for the highest winning percentage. Toledo finished the tournament tied for 13th place with a 5–5 record. In 2022, the Triple-A East became known as the International League, the name historically used by the regional circuit prior to the 2021 reorganization.

== Season-by-season records ==
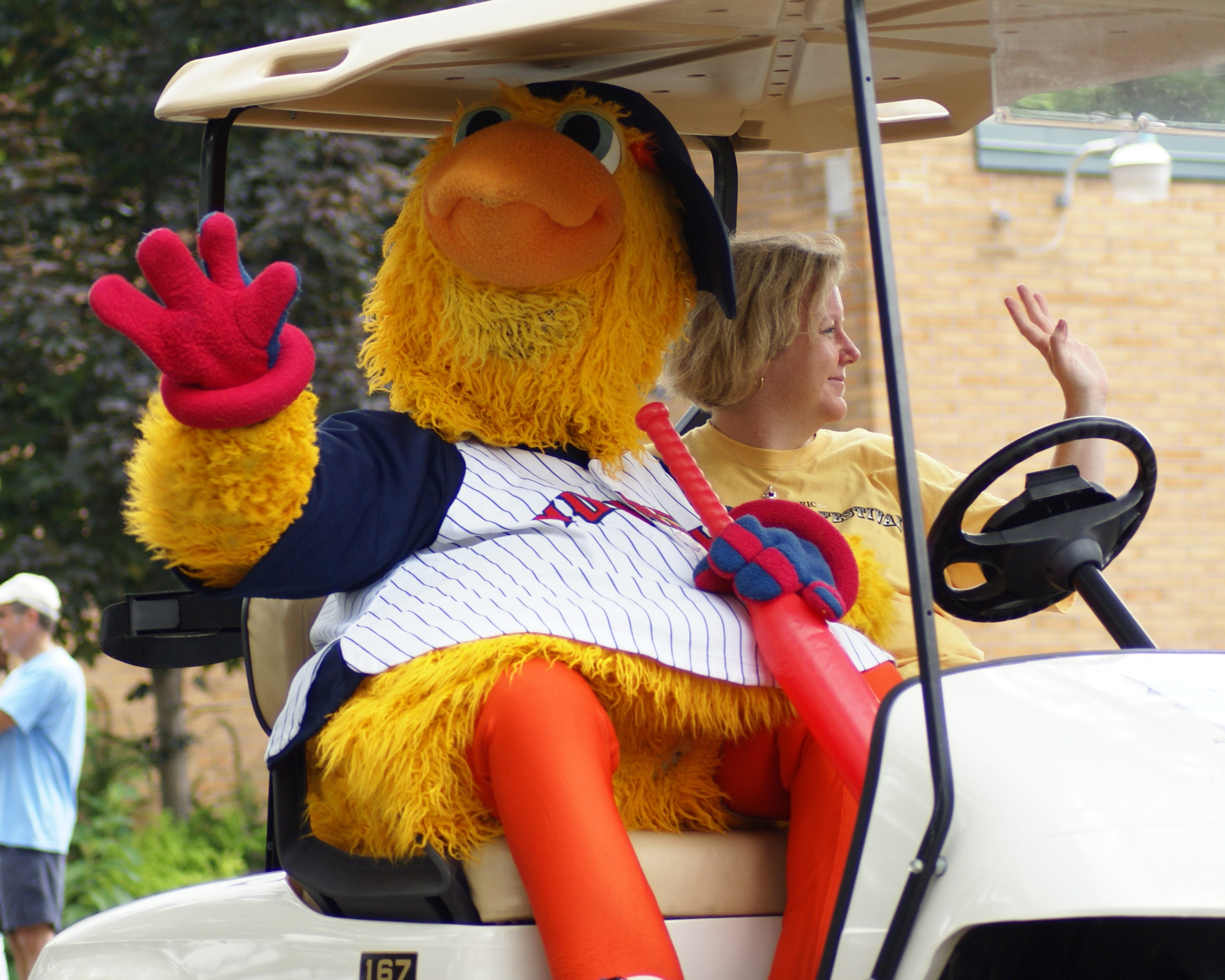
Muddy in a parade

Toledo Mud Hens seasons are listed below.

Toledo Mud Hens season records
Season	Wins	Losses	League	Division
1896	86	46	1st ISL	—
1897	83	43	1st ISL	—
1898	86	68	2nd ISL	—
1899	82	58	4th ISL	—
1900	81	58	3rd ISL	—
1901	78	60	3rd WA	—
1902	42	98	8th AA	—
1903	48	91	8th AA	—
1904	42	109	8th AA	—
1905	60	91	7th AA	—
1906	79	69	4th AA	—
1907	88	65	2nd AA	—
1908	81	72	4th AA	—
1909	80	86	6th AA	—
1910	91	75	2nd AA	—
1911	78	86	6th AA	—
1912	98	66	2nd AA	—
1913	69	98	6th AA	—
1914	53	93	8th SML	—
1919	59	91	7th AA	—
1920	87	79	3rd AA	—
1921	80	88	7th AA	—
1922	65	101	7th AA	—
1923	54	114	8th AA	—
1924	82	83	5th AA	—
1925	77	90	6th AA	—
1926	87	77	4th AA	—
1927	101	67	1th AA	—
1928	79	88	6th AA	—
1929	67	100	4th AA	—
1930	88	66	3rd AA	—
1931	68	100	8th AA	—
1932	87	80	4th AA	—
1933	70	83	T-5th in AA	—
1934	68	84	6th in AA	—
1935	64	86	7th AA	—
1936	59	92	8th AA	—
1937	89	65	2nd AA	—
1938	79	74	5th AA	—
1939	47	107	8th AA	—
1940	59	90	7th AA	—
1941	82	72	5th AA	—
1942	78	73	4th AA	—
1943	76	76	4th AA	—
1944	95	58	2nd AA	—
1945	69	84	6th AA	—
1946	69	84	6th AAA	—
1947	61	92	8th AAA	—
1948	61	91	7th AAA	—
1949	64	90	8th AAA	—
1950	65	87	7th AAA	—
1951	70	82	6th AAA	—
1952	46	107	8th AAA	—
1965	68	78	7th IL	—
1966	71	75	6th IL	—
1967	73	66	3rd IL	—
1968	83	64	1st IL	—
1969	68	72	6th IL	—
1970	51	89	8th IL	—
1971	60	80	7th IL	—
1972	75	69	5th IL	—
1973	65	81	7th IL	4th IL North
1974	70	74	5th IL	3rd IL North
1975	62	78	7th IL	—
1976	55	85	8th IL	—
1977	56	84	8th IL	—
1978	74	66	3rd IL	—
1979	63	76	7th IL	—
1980	77	63	2nd IL	—
1981	53	87	8th IL	—
1982	60	80	7th IL	—
1983	68	72	5th IL	—
1984	74	63	3rd IL	—
1985	71	68	6th IL	—
1986	62	77	6th IL	—
1987	70	70	5th IL	—
1988	58	84	8th IL	4th IL West
1989	69	76	6th IL	4th IL West
1990	58	86	8th IL	4th IL West
1991	74	70	5th IL	3rd IL West
1992	64	80	6th IL	3rd IL West
1993	65	77	7th IL	5th IL West
1994	63	79	9th IL	5th IL West
1995	71	71	6th IL	4th IL West
1996	70	72	T-5th IL	3rd IL West
1997	68	73	7th IL	5th IL West
1998	52	89	14th IL	4th IL West
1999	57	87	14th IL	4th IL West
2000	55	86	12th IL	4th IL West
2001	65	79	12th	4th IL West
2002	81	63	4th IL	1st IL West
2003	65	78	11th IL	3rd IL West
2004	65	78	14th IL	4th IL West
2005	89	55	1st IL	1st IL West
2006	76	66	5th IL	1st IL West
2007	82	61	2nd IL	1st IL West
2008	75	69	4th IL	2nd in IL West
2009	73	70	6th IL	2nd IL West
2010	70	73	9th IL	4th IL West
2011	67	77	11th IL	4th IL West
2012	60	84	13th IL	3rd IL West
2013	61	83	13th IL	4th IL West
2014	69	74	8th IL	3rd IL West
2015	61	83	13th IL	4th IL West
2016	68	76	8th IL	4th IL West
2017	70	71	8th IL	3rd IL West
2018	73	66	4th IL	1st IL West
2019	66	74	T-9th IL	T-2nd IL West
2020	Season cancelled due to COVID-19 pandemic			
2021	74	56	6th	1st AAAE Midwest
2022	87	63	2nd IL	2nd IL West
2023	70	78	14th IL	8th IL West
2024	69	80	15th IL	8th IL West
2025	84	66	7th IL	3rd IL West
2026	74	74	12th IL	7th IL West

== Rivalries ==
=== Columbus Clippers ===
The Mud Hens' rivalry with the Columbus Clippers dates back to 1977, when the Clippers joined the International League and were the second Ohio team in the league. The two teams play in the International League's West Division. The Clippers are an affiliate of the Cleveland Guardians, who compete against the Detroit Tigers in the American League Central, adding another layer to the rivalry.

=== Indianapolis Indians ===
The Mud Hens' rivalry with the Indianapolis Indians dates back to 1998, when the Indians joined the International League. They faced each other in the Governors' Cup Finals in 2005, which the Mud Hens won in a sweep. The following season, they faced each other in a play-in game—the winner would win the IL West Division and clinch a spot in the 2006 Governor's Cup playoffs—which the Mud Hens won, 4–0.

== Playoffs ==
The Mud Hens also won Interstate League playoffs in 1896 and 1897. While competing in the American Association, Toledo was the league champion in 1927, prior to the league having a postseason. Subsequently, Toledo reached the semifinals in 1937, 1943, and 1944. They reached the championship series in 1942. In 1967, Toledo played their first playoff game in the Governors' Cup playoffs. In 1968, the Mud Hens finished first for the regular season but lost in the playoff semifinals.

Toledo Mud Hens playoff appearances
Season	Semifinals	Finals	Class Title
Interstate League (Class–C), (Class–B)
1896	—	W, 4–0, Wayne Farmers	—
1897	—	W, 4–0, Dayton Old Soldiers	—
American Association (AA)
1937	L, 4–2, Milwaukee Brewers	—	—
1942	W, 4–2, Milwaukee Brewers	L, 4–0, Columbus Red Birds	—
1943	L, 3–2, Indianapolis Indians	—	—
1944	L, 4–3, St. Paul Saints	—	—
International League (AAA)
1967	W, 3–2, Richmond Braves	W, 4–1, Columbus Jets	—
1968	L, 3–1, Jacksonville Suns	—	—
1978	L, 3–2, Pawtucket Red Sox	—	—
1980	W, 3–1, Rochester Red Wings	L, 4–1, Columbus Clippers	—
1984	L, 3–0, Maine Guides	—	—
2002	L, 3–0, Durham Bulls	—	—
2005	W, 3–2, Norfolk Tides	W, 3–0, Indianapolis Indians	—
2006	W, 3–1, Charlotte Knights	W, 3–2, Rochester Red Wings	L, 1–0, Tucson Sidewinders
2007	L, 3–0, Durham Bulls	—	—
2018	L, 3–1, Durham Bulls	—	—

== Retired numbers ==
Toledo Mud Hens retired numbers
No.	Player	Position
1	Gene Cook	General Manager
15	Larry Parrish	Manager
27	Mike Hessman	3B

== Roster ==
Toledo Mud Hens roster
Players		Coaches/Other
Pitchers: 44 Yoniel Curet; 65 Carl Edwards Jr.; 37 Dylan File; 43 Jack Flaherty *; 59 Austin Gomber; 38 Andre Granillo; 36 Jack Little; 26 Tyler Mattison; 58 Hayden Minton; 8 Nick Sandlin; 32 Jackson Wolf	Catchers: 9 Josue Briceño; 20 Bennett Lee; 12 Carlos Perez *; 28 Seby Zavala; Infielders: 23 Max Anderson; 41 Max Burt; 11 Andrew Navigato; Outfielders: 3 Justice Bigbie; 22 Trei Cruz; 33 James Outman; 14 Michael Siani; 6 Cal Stevenson	Manager: 40 Gary Jones; Coaches: 34 Doug Bochtler (pitching); 10 Francisco Contreras (hitting); 27 Mike Hessman (hitting); 25 Jimmy Robbins (bullpen); 7-day injured list; * On Detroit Tigers 40-man roster; ~ Development list; # Rehab assignment; ∞ Reserve list; ‡ Restricted list; § Suspended list; † Temporarily inactive list; Roster updated October 2, 2026; Transactions; → More rosters: MiLB • International League; → Detroit Tigers minor league players

== Notable players ==
Mud Hens players who were later inducted into the National Baseball Hall of Fame include:

- Roger Bresnahan
- Addie Joss
- Freddie Lindstrom
- Kirby Puckett
- Billy Southworth
- Casey Stengel
- Hack Wilson

Mud Hens players who were selected as MLB All-Stars during their careers include:

- Steve Avery
- Nicholas Castellanos
- Tony Clark
- Pat Dobson
- Dave Engle
- Ed Farmer
- Travis Fryman
- Freddy García
- Curtis Granderson
- Riley Greene
- Shane Greene
- Marv Grissom
- Carlos Guillén
- Mike Henneman
- Willie Hernández
- John Hudek
- Omar Infante
- Gregg Jefferies
- Thornton Lee
- José Lima
- Mike Marshall
- J. D. Martinez
- Víctor Martínez
- Bobby Murcer
- Joe Nathan
- Phil Nevin
- Jeff Newman
- Joe Niekro
- Dean Palmer
- Lance Parrish
- Carlos Peña
- Dick Radatz
- Mark Redman
- Fernando Rodney
- Kenny Rogers
- Max Scherzer
- Rip Sewell
- Vern Stephens
- Dizzy Trout
- José Valverde
- Justin Verlander
- Frank Viola
- Dixie Walker
- Gary Ward
- Scott Williamson
- Dontrelle Willis
- Dmitri Young
- Al Zarilla

Mud Hens players who later managed MLB teams include:

- A. J. Hinch
- Gabe Kapler
- Gene Lamont
- Torey Lovullo
- Sam Perlozzo
- Casey Stengel
- Ron Washington
- Eric Wedge
- Kirk Gibson

Other Mud Hens players of note:

- Billy Beane, three-time Sporting News Executive of the Year and subject of Moneyball
- Moe Berg, spy for the Office of Strategic Services during World War II
- Mike Hessman, International League All-Time Home Run leader
- Ralph Schwamb, convicted murderer
- Jim Thorpe, two-time Olympic gold medal winner and inductee of the Pro Football Hall of Fame and College Football Hall of Fame
- Craig Monroe, broadcasts on Bally Sports Detroit
- Cameron Maybin, broadcasts on Bally Sports Detroit

== In popular culture ==
- M*A*S*H character Maxwell Klinger (played by Jamie Farr) hailed from Toledo and often mentioned the Mud Hens as his favorite baseball team throughout the series. He was often seen wearing a Toledo Mud Hens cap (which bears a strong resemblance to a Texas Rangers cap) and jersey. In fact, Klinger feels so strongly about the Mud Hens that he gets put on KP duty for a month when he punches his archnemesis, Sgt. Zelmo Zale, who insulted the Mud Hens. Like Klinger, Farr was born and raised in Toledo, and the Mud Hens retired jersey No. 1 in Farr's honor. Colonel Sherman Potter (played by Harry Morgan) was also a fan of the Mud Hens and was seen wearing their swag on several episodes of the series.
- The title character of the comic strip Crankshaft was a pitcher for the Mud Hens just before World War II when he enlisted in the Army. He invariably wears a Mud Hens cap in the strip and reminisces often about his playing days. In the summer of 2016, the Mud Hens retired jersey No. 13 in Crankshaft's honor.
- Lou Brown, the fictional manager of the Cleveland Indians in the film Major League, was said to have managed in Toledo for 30 years prior to managing the Indians.
- Richard Pryor's character, Montgomery Brewster, in the 1985 film Brewster's Millions was said to have previously pitched for the Mud Hens.
- The Melissa & Joey character Joe Longo (played by Joey Lawrence) is a Mud Hens fan and claims they win every single time he goes to the game with his foam finger. In season 3, episode 21 "Plus One", Mel Hart (played by Melissa Joan Hart) gets tickets right behind first base for Joe. They both end up at the game later in the episode.

== See also ==
- List of baseball parks in Toledo, Ohio

== Sources ==
- The Toledo Baseball Guide of the Mud Hens 1883–1943, Ralph Elliott Lin Weber, 1944.
