= Indianapolis Hoosiers (minor league baseball) =

Baseball team list

At least three teams in minor league baseball have borne the name Indianapolis Hoosiers.

== Western League Hoosiers I ==
The first Western League, which lasted only part of the 1885 season, included an Indianapolis Hoosiers team. This Hoosiers team won the 1885 Western League pennant.

== Western League Hoosiers II ==
Another Hoosiers minor-league team came into existence in 1894. It was a charter member of the third Western League, which became the American League in 1900. Despite winning three Western League pennants (1895, 1897, 1899), this team was contracted when the AL became an official major league in 1901.

== Western Association Hoosiers ==
One of the two Western Associations that existed in 1901 also had a team known as the Indianapolis Hoosiers. Both the team and league lasted only one season.
