= Western League (1885–1899) =

U. S. professional baseball leagues

Western League of Professional Baseball Clubs
- Most recent season or competition: 1899
- Sport: Baseball
- Founded: February 11, 1885
- First season: 1885
- Replaced by: American League
- President: Ban Johnson (1894–1899)
- Country: United States
- Continent: North America
- Most recent champion: Indianapolis Hoosiers (1899)
- Most titles: Indianapolis (4)
- Related competitions: Western Association Northwestern League

The Western League was the name of several minor league baseball leagues that operated between 1885 and 1899. These leagues were focused mainly in the Midwestern United States.

The 1893 incarnation of the league hired Ban Johnson as president in 1894. In 1899, Johnson renamed it the American League and declared that it was now a major league, intending to compete against the older National League of 1876, which was centered in the American Northeast states.

== History ==
Before its incarnation in November 1893, the Western League existed in various forms. The League was formed as a minor league on February 11, 1885. The original clubs were located in Indianapolis‚ Kansas City‚ Cleveland‚ Milwaukee‚ Toledo and Omaha/Keokuk, Iowa. The season began on April 18, 1885 with the Indianapolis Hoosiers winning the first title with a record of 27–4–1. The league then folded on June 15, 1885.

The league was reformed on January 18, 1886, to play an 80-game schedule. Denver won the pennant on September 20, 1886 with a record of 54 wins and 26 losses. In 1887, the league was dominated by Topeka's Golden Giants, a high-priced collection of major leaguers, including Bug Holliday, Jim Conway, Perry Werden and Jimmy Macullar, which won the title by 15½ games on October 2, 1887. The league returned in February 1888, but dissolved after a partial season on June 21, 1888. Denver had finished first with a record of 18 wins and 6 losses. The league was revived in 1892. Columbus won the title with a record of 46 wins and 26 losses. The league shut down on July 11, 1892.

The league was revived on May 17, 1893 and had planned a schedule before being shut down on June 20, 1893.

=== Reorganization and conversion to American League ===
In a meeting in Indianapolis, Indiana, on November 20, 1893, the Western League reorganized again and named Ban Johnson its president, who would remain so until his retirement in the 1920s. From this point forward, this version of the WL has continued in existence, eventually becoming the modern-day American League. Initially, league headquarters were to be in Cincinnati, Ohio, where Johnson was based as a sport editor for a newspaper, but were ultimately located in Chicago. Johnson had been recommended by his friend Charles Comiskey, a former major league star with the St. Louis Browns in the 1880s, who was then managing the Cincinnati Reds. After the 1894 season, when Comiskey's contract with the Reds was up, he decided to take his chances at ownership. He bought the Sioux City team and transferred it to Saint Paul, Minnesota. These two men were among the cornerstones of the American League.

After the 1899 season, the National League announced it was dropping four of its franchises, reducing its membership from 12 to 8 teams. The franchises that were eliminated were Baltimore, Cleveland, Louisville and Washington. This afforded an opportunity for the Western circuit to expand into those vacated cities.

In a meeting in Chicago on October 11, 1899, the Western League renamed itself the American League. It was still a minor league, subject to the National Agreement, and generally subordinate to the older National League of Major League Baseball, which was founded in 1876. The NL gave permission to the new AL to put a team in Chicago that year, and Comiskey moved his St. Paul club to the South Side. However, the new team in Chicago was subject to rules from the NL. The Cubs (then called the Orphans) were allowed to draft two players each year from the AL team. Comiskey was also barred from using the name "Chicago" in all of his dealings, so he cleverly revived the old moniker "White Stockings" from the days of Cap Anson for his team. The AL also transferred the Grand Rapids team to Cleveland for the 1900 season.

After the 1900 season, the American League declined to renew its membership in the "National Agreement" and declared itself a "major league". It began raiding NL team rosters and attempting to compete directly against the NL. The franchises in the smaller cities of Buffalo, Indianapolis, Kansas City and Minneapolis were replaced by the larger, more important urban centers of Baltimore, Boston, Philadelphia and Washington for the 1901 season. The second and third of those cities already had NL teams. Next, Milwaukee moved to St. Louis in 1902. Baltimore, having fallen into disarray, was replaced by New York City in 1903, for the reason that the new league would not be totally respected and have "major league" status without a team in the nation's largest city. The American League team lineup settled on five franchises in cities that already had NL teams (Boston, Chicago, New York, Philadelphia, and St. Louis) and two in cities that had been recently abandoned by the NL (Cleveland and Washington), but only one in a city remaining from the former Western League lineup of 1899 (Detroit). Four of the other 1899 Western League cities now host Major League Baseball today (Kansas City, Milwaukee, and Minneapolis and Saint Paul jointly), while three do not (Buffalo, Grand Rapids, and Indianapolis, but all have minor league teams). This membership list for both leagues lasted in place for nearly a half-century until the move of the Boston Braves to Milwaukee in 1953, the St. Louis Browns to Baltimore, becoming the new Baltimore Orioles in 1954, and the Philadelphia Athletics to Kansas City in 1955.

The American League's claim to major league status was disputed, but had to be recognized after the Boston Red Sox defeated the NL champion Pittsburgh Pirates in the first World Series held in late 1903.

=== 20th century Western League ===
When Ban Johnson changed his league's name to the American League before the 1900 season, another "Western League" was immediately formed to function on the supporting minor-league level. This league operated from 1900 to 1937 and later from 1947 to 1958. Its franchises were located west of the Mississippi River, in the Great Plains and Rocky Mountains states.

In its post-World War II incarnation, the later Western League included clubs in Denver, Colorado; Des Moines, Iowa; Omaha, Nebraska; and Colorado Springs, Colorado. Each of those cities later served as the home for a Triple-A team in the Pacific Coast League (the Denver Bears, Iowa Cubs, Omaha Royals, and Colorado Springs Sky Sox, respectively).

Several other 20th century minor-league circuits have also used the same name.

== Cities represented 1885–1888, 1892 ==
- Cleveland, Ohio: Cleveland Forest Citys (1885)
- Columbus, Ohio: Columbus Reds (1892)
- Denver, Colorado: Denver Mountain Lions (1886); Denver Mountaineers (1887–1888)
- Emporia, Kansas: Emporia (1887)
- Fort Wayne, Indiana: Fort Wayne (1892)
- Hastings, Nebraska: Hastings Hustlers (1887)
- Hutchinson, Kansas: Hutchinson (1888)
- Indianapolis, Indiana: Indianapolis Hoosiers (1886, 1892)
- Kansas City, Missouri: Kansas City Cowboys (1885, 1887, 1892)
- Keokuk, Iowa: Keokuk Hawkeyes (1885)
- Leadville, Colorado: Leadville Blues (1886)
- Leavenworth, Kansas: Leavenworth Soldiers (1886–1888)
- Lincoln, Nebraska: Lincoln Tree Planters (1886–188)
- Milwaukee, Wisconsin: Milwaukee Brewers (1885); Milwaukee Brewers (1892)
- Minneapolis, Minnesota: Minneapolis Minnies (1892)
- Newton, Kansas: Newton (1888)
- Omaha, Nebraska: Omaha Omahogs (1885 1887, 1892)
- St. Joseph, Missouri: St. Joseph Reds (1886–1887)
- St. Paul, Minnesota: St. Paul Saints (1892)
- Toledo, Ohio: Toledo Avengers (1885); Toledo Black Pirates (1892)
- Topeka, Kansas Topeka Capitals (1886); Topeka Golden Giants (1887)
- Wichita, Kansas: Wichita Braves (1887)

== League members 1894–1899 ==
- Buffalo Bisons (1899)
  - St. Joseph Saints (1898)
    - Omaha Omahogs (1898)
      - Grand Rapids Rustlers/Goldbugs/Bob-o-links (1894–1897)
- Detroit Tigers (1894–1899)
- Indianapolis Hoosiers (1894–1899)
- Grand Rapids Prodigals (1899)
  - Columbus Buckeyes/Senators (1896–1899)
- Kansas City Blues (1894–1899)
- Milwaukee Brewers (1894–1899)
- Minneapolis Millers (1894–1899)
- St. Paul Saints (1895–1899)
  - Sioux City Cornhuskers (1894)
- Terre Haute Hottentots (1895)
  - Toledo Swamp Angels (1895)
  - Toledo White Stockings (1894)

=== Timeline ===
The first line is the formation of the 1894–1899 Western League (WL). The second line marks when the WL was classified as a Class A minor league. The third line marks when the Western League was renamed the American League (AL). The fourth line marks the declaration that the AL was a major league.

Pennant winners are shown with a "•".

== Pennant winners ==
- 1885 – Indianapolis Hoosiers
- 1886 – Denver Mountain Lions
- 1887 – Topeka Golden Giants
- 1888 – Denver Mountaineers
- 1892 – Columbus Reds
- 1894 – Sioux City Cornhuskers
- 1895 – Indianapolis Hoosiers
- 1896 – Minneapolis Millers
- 1897 – Indianapolis Hoosiers
- 1898 – Kansas City Blues
- 1899 – Indianapolis Hoosiers

* There were no seasons in 1889, 1890, 1891, and 1893

== Sources ==
- The National League Story, Lee Allen, Putnam, 1961.
- The American League Story, Lee Allen, Putnam, 1962.
- On to Nicollet, Stew Thornley, Nodin Press, 1988.
- Batter-Up!, Ross Bernstein, Nodin Press, 2002.
- ProQuest Historical Newspapers
- Total Baseball, 8th edition, John Thorn, Phil Birnbaum, Bill Deane, and Rob Neyer, SportClassic Press, 2004.
- Madden, W.C; Stewart, Patrick J. (2002). The Western League: A Baseball History, 1885 through 1999. McFarland. ISBN 9780786410033.
