= Major League Baseball Constitution =

The Major League Baseball Constitution is a document under which the day-to-day operation of Major League Baseball is conducted. It was originally drafted in 1903 as the Constitution of the National League and has since been amended several times, most recently in June 2005.

== 1876 National League Constitution ==
The 1876 Constitution of the National League consisted of 14 articles. The League originally consisted of 8 teams:

- Athletic Base Ball Club of Philadelphia, PA
- Boston Base Ball Club of Boston, MA
- Hartford Base Ball Club of Hartford, CT
- Mutual Base Ball Club of Brooklyn, NY
- Chicago Base Ball Club of Chicago, IL
- Cincinnati Base Ball Club of Cincinnati, OH
- Louisville Base Ball Club of Louisville, KY
- St. Louis Base Ball Club of St. Louis, MO

Under the original constitution, the League had 3 objects: to encourage baseball, to take care of the interests of the players, and to establish and regulate the baseball championship of the United States.

The league was governed by a five-member board, from among whom was elected a president. The board also selected a secretary and treasurer. Annual dues for each club were $100.

== Current Major League Constitution ==
The current constitution consists of the following sections:

- Article I - Formation and Duration of Constitution
- Article II - The Commissioner (9 sections)
- Article III - The Executive Council (4 sections)
- Article IV - Rules, Resolutions and Regulations
- Article V - Major League Meetings (3 sections)
- Article VI - Arbitration (3 sections)
- Article VII - Superseding Effect
- Article VIII - Clubs and Territories
  1. 30 clubs, 2 leagues, 3 divisions (lists the clubs in each league and division)
  2. Expansion, Contraction, Realignment, Divisions
  3. Voluntary Termination
  4. Involuntary Termination (12 subsections a-l)
  5. Termination Procedure
  6. Effect of Termination
  7. Effect of Termination on Active Player Contracts and Reservation Rights
  8. Operating Territories
    - a) National League (lists cities)
    - b) American League (lists cities)
  9. Home Television Territories
- Article IX - Conduct of Championship Season and Post-Season
  1. Schedule
  2. Playing Rules
  3. Parks not to be changed during season
  4. Championship Season and Post-Season
  5. All-Star Game
- Article X - Major League Central Fund
  1. Maintenance of Major League Central Fund
  2. All-Star Game Revenues and Expenses
  3. Major League Club Broadcasts (4 subsections a-d)
  4. National and International Broadcast, Copyright and Royalties
  5. Payments from Central Fund, Books of Account (4 subsections a-d)
  6. Termination of Central Fund
- Article XI - Miscellaneous
  1. Fiscal Responsibility
  2. Indemnification of officials
  3. Major League Regulations

== See also ==
- The Official Professional Baseball Rules Book
