= 1890 Chicago Colts season =

1890 Chicago Colts
- League: National League
- Ballpark: West Side Park
- City: Chicago
- Record: 84–53 (.613)
- League place: 2nd
- Owner: Albert Spalding
- Manager: Cap Anson

The 1890 Chicago Colts season was the 19th season of the Chicago Colts franchise, the 15th in the National League and the sixth at the first West Side Park. The Colts finished second in the National League with a record of 83–53.

== Regular season ==
=== Season standings ===
National League
Team	W	L	Pct.	GB	Home	Road
Brooklyn Bridegrooms	86	43	.667	—	58‍–‍16	28‍–‍27
Chicago Colts	83	53	.610	6½	48‍–‍24	35‍–‍29
Philadelphia Phillies	78	53	.595	9	54‍–‍21	24‍–‍32
Cincinnati Reds	77	55	.583	10½	50‍–‍23	27‍–‍32
Boston Beaneaters	76	57	.571	12	43‍–‍23	33‍–‍34
New York Giants	63	68	.481	24	37‍–‍27	26‍–‍41
Cleveland Spiders	44	88	.333	43½	30‍–‍37	14‍–‍51
Pittsburgh Alleghenys	23	113	.169	66½	14‍–‍25	9‍–‍88

=== Record vs. opponents ===
1890 National League record Sources:
Team	BSN	BRO	CHI	CIN	CLE	NYG	PHI	PIT
Boston	—	6–11	8–11	11–8	13–7	11–8–1	11–9	16–3
Brooklyn	11–6	—	11–9	9–7	17–3	10–8	10–8	18–2
Chicago	11–8	9–11	—	12–8–2	13–7	13–6	8–10–1	17–3
Cincinnati	8–11	7–9	8–12–2	—	13–4	14–6	11–9	16–4
Cleveland	7–13	3–17	7–13	4–13	—	6–12–2	5–14–1	12–6–1
New York	8–11–1	8–10	6–13	6–14	12–6–2	—	6–11	17–3–1
Philadelphia	9–11	8–10	10–8–1	9–11	14–5–1	11–6	—	17–2
Pittsburgh	3–16	2–18	3–17	4–16	6–12–1	3–17–1	2–17	—

== Roster ==
1890 Chicago Colts
Roster
Pitchers: Roscoe Coughlin; Fred Demarais; Ed Eiteljorge; Ossie France; Robert Gibson; Bill Hutchison; Pat Luby; Ed Stein; Mike Sullivan	Catchers: Marty Honan; Malachi Kittridge; Chuck Lauer; Tom Nagle; Infielders: Cap Anson; Tom Burns; Jimmy Cooney; Bob Glenalvin; Ed Hutchinson; Pete O'Brien; Pat Wright	Outfielders: Jim Andrews; Cliff Carroll; Howard Earl; Elmer Foster; Dad Lytle; Jake Stenzel; Walt Wilmot	Manager: Cap Anson

== Player stats ==
=== Batting ===
==== Starters by position ====
Note: Pos = Position; G = Games played; AB = At bats; H = Hits; Avg. = Batting average; HR = Home runs; RBI = Runs batted in

Pos	Player	G	AB	H	Avg.	HR	RBI
C	Malachi Kittridge	96	333	67	.201	3	35
1B	Cap Anson	139	504	157	.312	7	107
2B	Bob Glenalvin	66	250	67	.268	4	26
3B	Tom Burns	139	538	149	.277	5	86
SS	Jimmy Cooney	135	574	156	.272	4	52
OF	Walt Wilmot	139	571	159	.278	13	99
OF	Jim Andrews	53	202	38	.188	3	17
OF	Cliff Carroll	136	582	166	.285	7	65

==== Other batters ====
Note: G = Games played; AB = At bats; H = Hits; Avg. = Batting average; HR = Home runs; RBI = Runs batted in

Player	G	AB	H	Avg.	HR	RBI
Howard Earl	92	384	95	.247	7	51
Tom Nagle	38	144	39	.271	1	11
Pete O'Brien	27	106	30	.283	3	16
Elmer Foster	27	105	26	.248	5	23
Jake Stenzel	11	41	11	.268	0	3
Ed Hutchinson	4	17	1	.059	0	0
Chuck Lauer	2	8	2	.250	0	2
Dad Lytle	1	4	0	.000	0	0
Marty Honan	1	3	0	.000	0	1
Pat Wright	1	2	0	.000	0	0

=== Pitching ===
==== Starting pitchers ====
Note: G = Games pitched; IP = Innings pitched; W = Wins; L = Losses; ERA = Earned run average; SO = Strikeouts

Player	G	IP	W	L	ERA	SO
Bill Hutchison	71	603.0	42	25	2.70	289
Pat Luby	34	267.2	20	9	3.19	85
Ed Stein	20	160.2	12	6	3.81	65
Mike Sullivan	12	96.0	5	6	4.59	33
Roscoe Coughlin	11	95.0	4	6	4.26	29
Robert Gibson	1	9.0	1	0	0.00	1
Ed Eiteljorge	1	2.0	0	1	22.50	1

==== Relief pitchers ====
Note: G = Games pitched; W = Wins; L = Losses; SV = Saves; ERA = Earned run average; SO = Strikeouts

Player	G	W	L	SV	ERA	SO
Fred Demarais	1	0	0	0	0.00	1
Ossie France	1	0	0	0	13.50	0
