= 1890 Cleveland Spiders season =

1890 Cleveland Spiders
- League: National League
- Ballpark: National League Park
- City: Cleveland, Ohio
- Record: 44–88 (.333)
- League place: 7th
- Owner: Frank Robison
- Managers: Gus Schmelz, Robert Leadley

The 1890 Cleveland Spiders finished with a 44–88 record and a seventh-place finish in the National League.

The team played six straight home games in Indianapolis, Indiana at Indianapolis Park between July 28 and August 2 against the Brooklyn Bridegrooms and New York Giants. It was a former Sunday-games ballpark of the Indianapolis Hoosiers who had folded at the end of the previous season.

== Regular season ==
=== Season standings ===
National League
Team	W	L	Pct.	GB	Home	Road
Brooklyn Bridegrooms	86	43	.667	—	58‍–‍16	28‍–‍27
Chicago Colts	83	53	.610	6½	48‍–‍24	35‍–‍29
Philadelphia Phillies	78	53	.595	9	54‍–‍21	24‍–‍32
Cincinnati Reds	77	55	.583	10½	50‍–‍23	27‍–‍32
Boston Beaneaters	76	57	.571	12	43‍–‍23	33‍–‍34
New York Giants	63	68	.481	24	37‍–‍27	26‍–‍41
Cleveland Spiders	44	88	.333	43½	30‍–‍37	14‍–‍51
Pittsburgh Alleghenys	23	113	.169	66½	14‍–‍25	9‍–‍88

=== Record vs. opponents ===
1890 National League record Sources:
Team	BSN	BRO	CHI	CIN	CLE	NYG	PHI	PIT
Boston	—	6–11	8–11	11–8	13–7	11–8–1	11–9	16–3
Brooklyn	11–6	—	11–9	9–7	17–3	10–8	10–8	18–2
Chicago	11–8	9–11	—	12–8–2	13–7	13–6	8–10–1	17–3
Cincinnati	8–11	7–9	8–12–2	—	13–4	14–6	11–9	16–4
Cleveland	7–13	3–17	7–13	4–13	—	6–12–2	5–14–1	12–6–1
New York	8–11–1	8–10	6–13	6–14	12–6–2	—	6–11	17–3–1
Philadelphia	9–11	8–10	10–8–1	9–11	14–5–1	11–6	—	17–2
Pittsburgh	3–16	2–18	3–17	4–16	6–12–1	3–17–1	2–17	—

=== Roster ===
1890 Cleveland Spiders
Roster
Pitchers: Ed Beatin; Bill Garfield; Ezra Lincoln; Charlie Parsons; Edgar Smith; Lee Viau; Jack Wadsworth; Cy Young	Catchers: Andy Sommers; Chief Zimmer; Infielders: Joe Ardner; Bill Delaney; Pat Lyons; Ed McKean; Will Smalley; Peek-A-Boo Veach; Jake Virtue	Outfielders: Vince Dailey; George Davis; Tom Dowse; Bob Gilks; Joe Sommer; Len Stockwell; Buck West; Rasty Wright	Manager: Robert Leadley; Gus Schmelz

== Player stats ==
=== Batting ===
==== Starters by position ====
Note: Pos = Position; G = Games played; AB = At bats; H = Hits; Avg. = Batting average; HR = Home runs; RBI = Runs batted in

Pos	Player	G	AB	H	Avg.	HR	RBI
C	Chief Zimmer	125	444	95	.214	2	57
1B	Peek-A-Boo Veach	64	238	56	.235	0	32
2B	Joe Ardner	84	323	72	.223	0	35
SS	Ed McKean	136	530	157	.296	7	61
3B	Will Smalley	136	502	107	.213	0	42
OF	Bob Gilks	130	544	116	.213	0	41
OF	George Davis	136	526	139	.264	6	73
OF	Vince Dailey	64	246	71	.289	0	32

==== Other batters ====
Note: G = Games played; AB = At bats; H = Hits; Avg. = Batting average; HR = Home runs; RBI = Runs batted in

Player	G	AB	H	Avg.	HR	RBI
Jake Virtue	62	223	68	.305	2	25
Tom Dowse	40	159	33	.208	0	9
Buck West	37	151	37	.245	2	29
Bill Delaney	36	116	22	.190	1	7
Rasty Wright	13	45	5	.111	0	2
Pat Lyons	11	38	2	.053	0	1
Joe Sommer	9	35	8	.229	0	0
Andy Sommers	9	34	7	.206	0	1
Len Stockwell	2	7	2	.286	0	0

=== Pitching ===
==== Starting pitchers ====
Note: G = Games pitched; IP = Innings pitched; W = Wins; L = Losses; ERA = Earned run average; SO = Strikeouts

Player	G	IP	W	L	ERA	SO
Ed Beatin	54	474.1	22	30	3.83	155
Jack Wadsworth	20	169.2	2	16	5.20	26
Cy Young	17	147.2	9	7	3.47	39
Ezra Lincoln	15	118.0	3	11	4.42	22
Lee Viau	13	107.0	4	9	3.36	30
Bill Garfield	9	70.0	1	7	4.89	16
Edgar Smith	6	44.0	1	4	4.30	11
Bob Gilks	4	31.2	2	2	4.26	5

==== Other pitchers ====
Note: G = Games pitched; IP = Innings pitched; W = Wins; L = Losses; ERA = Earned run average; SO = Strikeouts

Player	G	IP	W	L	ERA	SO
Charlie Parsons	2	9.0	0	1	6.00	2
Vince Dailey	2	7.0	0	1	7.71	0

==== Relief pitchers ====
Note: G = Games pitched; W = Wins; L = Losses; SV = Saves; ERA = Earned run average; SO = Strikeouts

Player	G	W	L	SV	ERA	SO
Tom Dowse	1	0	0	0	5.40	0
Joe Sommer	1	0	0	0	0.00	0
