= 1890 New York Giants season =

1890 New York Giants
- League: National League
- Ballpark: Polo Grounds
- City: New York City
- Record: 63–68 (.481)
- League place: 6th
- Owner: John B. Day
- Manager: Jim Mutrie

The 1890 New York Giants season was the franchise's eighth season. The team finished in sixth place in the National League with a 63–68 record, 24 games behind the Brooklyn Bridegrooms. They also had to contend with a new crosstown rival, the New York Giants of the Players' League.

== Regular season ==
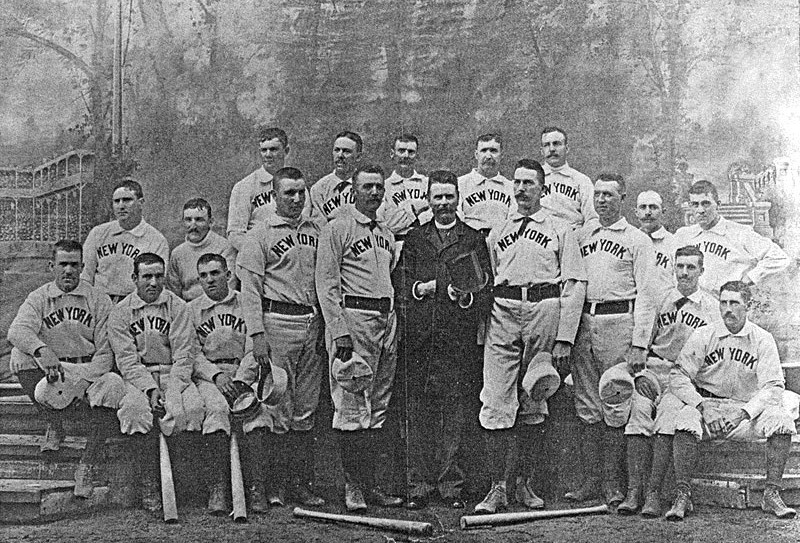
1890 New York Giants

=== Season standings ===
National League
Team	W	L	Pct.	GB	Home	Road
Brooklyn Bridegrooms	86	43	.667	—	58‍–‍16	28‍–‍27
Chicago Colts	83	53	.610	6½	48‍–‍24	35‍–‍29
Philadelphia Phillies	78	53	.595	9	54‍–‍21	24‍–‍32
Cincinnati Reds	77	55	.583	10½	50‍–‍23	27‍–‍32
Boston Beaneaters	76	57	.571	12	43‍–‍23	33‍–‍34
New York Giants	63	68	.481	24	37‍–‍27	26‍–‍41
Cleveland Spiders	44	88	.333	43½	30‍–‍37	14‍–‍51
Pittsburgh Alleghenys	23	113	.169	66½	14‍–‍25	9‍–‍88

=== Record vs. opponents ===
1890 National League record Sources:
Team	BSN	BRO	CHI	CIN	CLE	NYG	PHI	PIT
Boston	—	6–11	8–11	11–8	13–7	11–8–1	11–9	16–3
Brooklyn	11–6	—	11–9	9–7	17–3	10–8	10–8	18–2
Chicago	11–8	9–11	—	12–8–2	13–7	13–6	8–10–1	17–3
Cincinnati	8–11	7–9	8–12–2	—	13–4	14–6	11–9	16–4
Cleveland	7–13	3–17	7–13	4–13	—	6–12–2	5–14–1	12–6–1
New York	8–11–1	8–10	6–13	6–14	12–6–2	—	6–11	17–3–1
Philadelphia	9–11	8–10	10–8–1	9–11	14–5–1	11–6	—	17–2
Pittsburgh	3–16	2–18	3–17	4–16	6–12–1	3–17–1	2–17	—

=== Roster ===
1890 New York Giants
Roster
Pitchers: Bob Murphy; Amos Rusie; Jack Sharrott; Mickey Welch	Catchers: Dick Buckley; Artie Clarke; Pat Murphy; Tom O'Rourke; Andy Sommers; Infielders: Charley Bassett; Sam Crane; Jerry Denny; Dude Esterbrook; Jack Glasscock; Shorty Howe; Mort Scanlan; Lew Whistler	Outfielders: Jesse Burkett; Ed Daily; John Henry; Joe Hornung; George McMillan; Mike Tiernan	Manager: Jim Mutrie

== Player stats ==
=== Batting ===
==== Starters by position ====
Note: Pos = Position; G = Games played; AB = At bats; H = Hits; Avg. = Batting average; HR = Home runs; RBI = Runs batted in

Pos	Player	G	AB	H	Avg.	HR	RBI
C	Dick Buckley	70	266	68	.256	2	26
1B	Lew Whistler	45	170	49	.288	2	29
2B	Charley Bassett	100	410	98	.239	0	54
SS	Jack Glasscock	124	512	172	.336	1	66
3B	Jerry Denny	114	437	93	.213	3	42
OF	Jesse Burkett	101	401	124	.309	4	60
OF	Joe Hornung	120	513	122	.238	0	65
OF	Mike Tiernan	133	553	168	.304	13	59

==== Other batters ====
Note: G = Games played; AB = At bats; H = Hits; Avg. = Batting average; HR = Home runs; RBI = Runs batted in

Player	G	AB	H	Avg.	HR	RBI
Artie Clarke	101	395	89	.225	0	49
Dude Esterbrook	45	197	57	.289	0	29
John Henry	37	144	35	.243	0	16
Pat Murphy	32	119	28	.235	0	9
Shorty Howe	19	64	11	.172	0	4
Andy Sommers	17	47	5	.106	0	1
George McMillan	10	35	5	.143	0	1
Sam Crane	4	12	0	.000	0	0
Mort Scanlan	3	10	0	.000	0	0
Tom O'Rourke	2	7	0	.000	0	0

=== Pitching ===
==== Starting pitchers ====
Note: G = Games pitched; IP = Innings pitched; W = Wins; L = Losses; ERA = Earned run average; SO = Strikeouts

Player	G	IP	W	L	ERA	SO
Amos Rusie	67	548.2	29	34	2.56	341
Mickey Welch	37	292.1	17	14	2.99	97
Jack Sharrott	25	184.0	11	10	2.89	84

==== Other pitchers ====
Note: G = Games pitched; IP = Innings pitched; W = Wins; L = Losses; ERA = Earned run average; SO = Strikeouts

Player	G	IP	W	L	ERA	SO
Jesse Burkett	21	118.0	3	10	5.57	82
Bob Murphy	3	18.0	1	0	5.50	8
Ed Daily	2	16.0	2	0	2.25	0
