= Chicago City League =

American minor league baseball league

- Classification: Independent
- Sport: Minor League Baseball
- First season: 1887
- Folded: 1910
- President: Unknown
- No. of teams: 8
- Country: United States
- Most titles: 2 Leland Giants (1909, 1910)

The Chicago City League was a minor league baseball league based in Chicago, Illinois. The Independent level league played with teams based entirely in Chicago. The league played in 1887, from 1890 to 1894 and 1909 to 1910 as a minor league. In the era of segregated baseball, the 1909 and 1910 leagues were integrated, with the Leland Giants joining as a member.

== History ==
The Chicago City League began minor league play in 1887. The 1887 league member teams are unknown.

The 1890 Chicago City League played with six team members. The Chicago Brands, Chicago Franklins, Chicago Garden Citys, Chicago Rivals, Chicago West Ends and Chicago Whitings were the six league franchises. Records and standings are unknown.

The Chicago City League continued play in 1891 with the same six franchises remaining.

The 1892 Chicago City League added two teams. The 1892 league members were the Chicago Brands, Chicago Crystals, Chicago Franklins, Chicago Garden Citys, Chicago Lake Views, Chicago Rivals, Chicago West Ends and Chicago Whitings.

The same eight teams continued Chicago City League play in the 1893 season.

The 1894 Chicago City League reduced to six teams. The 1894 league played with the Chicago Brands, Chicago Franklins, Chicago Garden Citys, Chicago Lake Views, Chicago Rivals and Chicago Whitings as the member teams. The Chicago City League disbanded after the season, in part because the league's better teams could schedule games independently and make more profit.

The Leland Giants played regular exhibition games against Chicago City League teams, integrating the league games.

In February, 1909, former Chicago White Sox player Nixey Callahan, owner of the Logan Squares team in Chicago, petitioned the National Commission for a working agreement for his team and other teams in Chicago. This occurred a year after major league stars Ty Cobb and Tommy Leach had approached Callahan about the possibility of leaving their teams to join the Logan Squares. The major leagues formally recognized player contracts with the Chicago clubs.

In the 1909 and 1910 seasons, the Chicago City League played again as an Independent minor league. The exact teams in the final two seasons are unknown, but the league was integrated, as the Leland Giants joined the league in 1909. Other league members of the reformed league reportedly included the Anson's Colts, Logan Squares, the Gunthers, the West Ends and Rogers Park. Cap Anson owned the Anson's Colts team.

It was reported that the Leland Giants won the 1909 Chicago City League championship by 7.0 games with a 31-9 record. The Leland Giants then played a three-game series against the Chicago Cubs in October, 1909. The Cubs won the first game 4–1 on October 18, 1909. With a 9th inning rally, the Cubs won the second game 6–5 and then the Cubs took the final game 1–0. The games were held at Gunther Park, located at 4701 North Ashland Avenue. Today, Chase Park is located at the site, on the corner of Ashland Avenue and Leland Avenue.

A Cuba based team, called the Stars of Cuba had been barnstorming in Chicago in 1909 and 1910. In July, 1910, it was reported the "Chicago Baseball League" as it was formally known, had barred member teams from playing against outside "colored baseball teams," including the Cuban teams. The ban did not include the member Leland Giants.

On August 27, 1910, the Logan Squares and Rogers Park played a night game, using a temporary lighting system. The Logan Squares won the game, 3–1, with 3,500 in attendance. Callahan played center field for his team in 1910 and led the league in stolen bases with 38, while hitting .333. On October 31, 1910 the Chicago Cubs defeated the Logan Squares 3–1 in an exhibition game.

It was reported the Leland Giants won the Chicago City League championship again in 1910 and the Chicago Cubs declined the offer to play the Leland Giants after the 1910 season.

In June, 2017, the Chicago Cubs honored the Leland Giants of the Chicago City League, wearing Leland Giants replica uniforms in a game against the Pittsburgh Pirates.

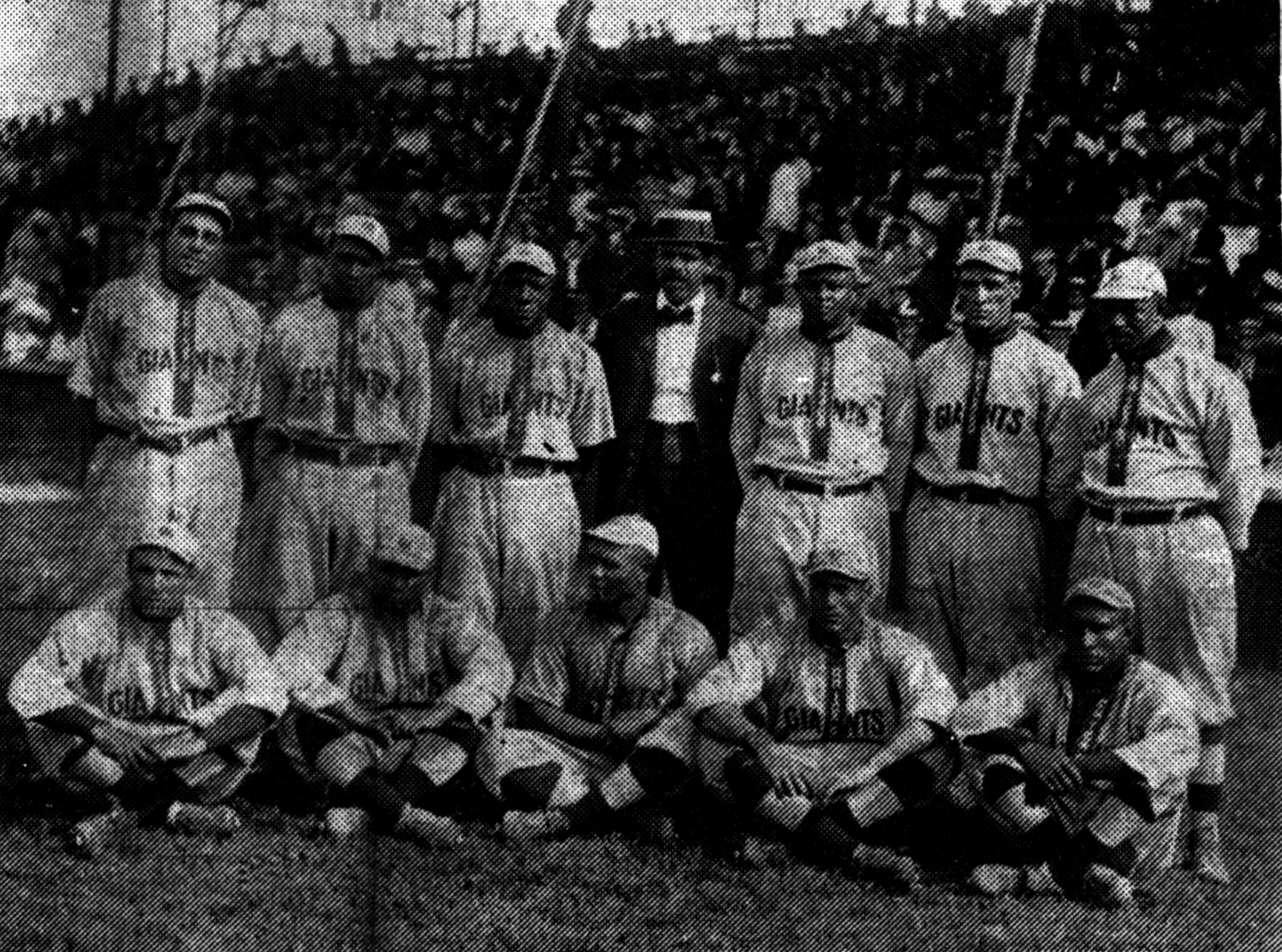
1910 Leland Giants

== Teams by season ==
- 1887: Unknown
- 1890: (6) Chicago Brands, Chicago Franklins, Chicago Garden Citys, Chicago Rivals, Chicago West Ends, Chicago Whitings
- 1891: (6) Chicago Brands, Chicago Franklins, Chicago Garden Citys, Chicago Rivals, Chicago West Ends, Chicago Whitings
- 1892: (8) Chicago Brands, Chicago Crystals, Chicago Franklins, Chicago Garden Citys, Chicago Lake Views, Chicago Rivals, Chicago West Ends, Chicago Whitings
- 1893: (8) Chicago Brands, Chicago Crystals, Chicago Franklins, Chicago Garden Citys, Chicago Lake Views, Chicago Rivals, Chicago West Ends, Chicago Whitings
- 1894: (6) Chicago Brands, Chicago Franklins, Chicago Garden Citys, Chicago Lake Views, Chicago Rivals, Chicago Whitings
- 1909: (6) Anson's Colts, Chicago West Ends, Gunthers, Leland Giants, Logan Squares, Rogers Park
- 1910: (6) Anson's Colts, Chicago West Ends, Gunthers, Leland Giants, Logan Squares, Rogers Park

== Standings ==
The Chicago City League's yearly standings and team records are unknown. It was reported the Leland Giants won the league championship in 1909 and 1910, with the 1909 team winning by 7.0 games, with a 31-9 record.

== Ballparks ==
The league ballparks are mostly unknown. Reportedly, the 1910 Leland Giants played home games at a Auburn Park, located where Wentworth Gardens is today. Today, the address is 3770 South Wentworth Avenue, Chicago, IL.

The 1891 ballparks were listed as: North - Clybourn and North Avenues; South - 39th Street and Wentworth Avenue; West - Ogden Avenue and Rockwell Street.[Chicago Tribune, June 7, 1891, p.4] The 39th and Wentworth location is of particular interest because it was within a block of the eventual South Side Park (III), the first home of the Chicago White Sox and then the long-time home of the Chicago American Giants. The local papers were calling it "Daly's ball park" by 1896, and then "Columbia Giants ball park" when the Columbia Giants moved to the city in 1899.

== Notable alumni ==
=== Baseball Hall of Fame alumni ===
- Cap Anson, Anson's Colts, owner (1909–1910)
- Rube Foster, Leland Giants (1909–1910)
- John Henry Lloyd, Leland Giants (1910)

=== Notable alumni ===
- Jim Andrews, Chicago Whitings/Lake Views (1891/1892–1894)
- Art Ball, Chicago Rivals (1893)
- Bill Bowman, Chicago Rivals (1890)
- Charlie Cady, Chicago Rivals/Garden Citys (1891/1894)
- Nixey Callahan, Logan Squares, player/owner (1909–1910)
- John Carbine, Chicago Franklins (1890)
- Pete Galligan, Chicago Garden Citys (1891)
- Ed Gastfield, Chicago Franklins (1891–1894)
- Emil Geiss, Chicago Brands (1894)
- Lou Gertenrich, Chicago Garden Citys (1894)
- Pretzels Getzien, Chicago Franklins (1894)
- Charlie Hallstrom, Chicago Whitings (1890–1891)
- John Hollison, Chicago Whitings (1892)
- Marty Honan, Chicago Whitings (1890)
- Home Run Johnson, Leland Giants (1910)
- Charlie Irwin, Chicago Rivals (1890)
- Walt Kinzie, Chicago Whitings/Rivals (1890/1891)
- Frank Meinke, Chicago Brands (1890)
- Joe Murphy, Chicago Whitings (1891)
- Pete O'Brien, Chicago Whitings (1891)
- Eddie O'Meara, Chicago Rivals (1891)
- Chick Pedroes, Chicago Franklins (1891)
- Skel Roach, Chicago Whitings (1894)
- George Rooks, Chicago Rivals (1894)
- Edward Santry, Chicago Franklins (1890)
- Mort Scanlan, Chicago Whitings (1891–1892)
- Dangerfield Talbert, Leland Giants (1909–1910)

== See also ==
Chicago Garden Citys players
Chicago Whitings players
Leland Giants players
