= List of Major League Baseball players (V) =

The following is a list of Major League Baseball players, retired or active. As of the end of the 2011 season, there have been 232 players with a last name that begins with V who have been on a major league roster at some point.

== V ==
Name	Debut	Final game	Position	Teams	Ref
Tex Vache	April 16, 1925	September 22, 1925	Outfielder	Boston Red Sox	
Gene Vadeboncoeur	July 11, 1884	July 22, 1884	Catcher	Philadelphia Quakers	
Harry Vahrenhorst	September 21, 1904	September 21, 1904	Pinch hitter	St. Louis Browns	
Bob Vail	August 27, 1908	September 18, 1908	Pitcher	Pittsburgh Pirates	
Mike Vail	August 18, 1975	July 30, 1984	Outfielder	New York Mets, Cleveland Indians, Chicago Cubs, Cincinnati Reds, San Francisco Giants, Montreal Expos, Los Angeles Dodgers	
Chris Valaika	August 24, 2010		Second baseman	Cincinnati Reds	
Luis Valbuena	September 2, 2008		Second baseman	Seattle Mariners, Cleveland Indians	
Carlos Valderrama	June 21, 2003	June 29, 2003	Outfielder	San Francisco Giants	
Marc Valdes	August 28, 1995	June 22, 2001	Pitcher	Florida Marlins, Montreal Expos, Houston Astros, Atlanta Braves	
Pedro Valdés	May 15, 1996	October 1, 2000	Outfielder	Chicago Cubs, Texas Rangers	
Raúl Valdés	August 24, 2010		Pitcher	New York Mets, St. Louis Cardinals, New York Yankees	
Roy Valdés	May 3, 1944	May 3, 1944	Pinch hitter	Washington Senators	
Sandy Valdespino	April 12, 1965	September 28, 1971	Outfielder	Minnesota Twins, Atlanta Braves, Houston Astros, Seattle Pilots, Milwaukee Brewers, Kansas City Royals	
Carlos Valdez	July 18, 1995	September 27, 1998	Pitcher	San Francisco Giants, Boston Red Sox	
Efrain Valdez	August 13, 1990	July 10, 1998	Pitcher	Cleveland Indians, Arizona Diamondbacks	
Ismael Valdez	June 15, 1994	October 1, 2005	Pitcher	Los Angeles Dodgers, Chicago Cubs, Anaheim Angels, Texas Rangers, Seattle Mariners, San Diego Padres, Florida Marlins	
José Valdez	April 17, 2011		Pitcher	Houston Astros	
Julio Valdez	September 2, 1980	April 30, 1983	Shortstop	Boston Red Sox	
Mario Valdez	June 15, 1997	June 22, 2001	First baseman	Chicago White Sox, Oakland Athletics	
Merkin Valdez	August 1, 2004		Pitcher	San Francisco Giants, Toronto Blue Jays, Texas Rangers	
Rafael Valdez	April 18, 1990	April 27, 1990	Pitcher	San Diego Padres	
René Valdez	April 21, 1957	September 28, 1957	Pitcher	Brooklyn Dodgers	
Sergio Valdez	September 10, 1986	September 26, 1995	Pitcher	Montreal Expos, Atlanta Braves, Cleveland Indians, Montreal Expos, Boston Red Sox, San Francisco Giants	
Wilson Valdez	September 7, 2004		Shortstop	Chicago White Sox, Seattle Mariners, San Diego Padres, Los Angeles Dodgers, New York Mets, Philadelphia Phillies	
José Valdivielso	June 21, 1955	September 30, 1961	Shortstop	Washington Senators, Minnesota Twins	
Danny Valencia	June 3, 2010		Third baseman	Minnesota Twins	
Eric Valent	June 8, 2001	May 27, 2005	Outfielder	Philadelphia Phillies, Cincinnati Reds, New York Mets	
Javier Valentín	September 13, 1997	September 28, 2008	Catcher	Minnesota Twins, Tampa Bay Devil Rays, Cincinnati Reds	
John Valentin	July 27, 1992	September 29, 2002	Utility infielder	Boston Red Sox, New York Mets	
José Valentín	September 17, 1992	July 20, 2007	Shortstop	Milwaukee Brewers, Chicago White Sox, Los Angeles Dodgers, New York Mets	
Bob Valentine	May 20, 1876	May 20, 1876	Catcher	New York Mutuals	
Bobby Valentine	September 2, 1969	September 30, 1979	Utility player	Los Angeles Dodgers, California Angels, San Diego Padres, New York Mets, Seattle Mariners	
Corky Valentine	April 17, 1954	May 29, 1955	Pitcher	Cincinnati Redlegs	
Ellis Valentine	September 3, 1975	October 2, 1985	Outfielder	Montreal Expos, New York Mets, California Angels, Texas Rangers	
Fred Valentine	September 7, 1959	September 24, 1968	Outfielder	Baltimore Orioles, Washington Senators (1961–1971)	
Joe Valentine	August 24, 2003	September 30, 2005	Pitcher	Cincinnati Reds	
John Valentine	May 3, 1883	August 3, 1883	Pitcher	Columbus Buckeyes	
Vito Valentinetti	June 20, 1954	May 11, 1959	Pitcher	Chicago White Sox, Chicago Cubs, Cleveland Indians, Detroit Tigers, Washington Senators	
Benny Valenzuela	April 27, 1958	September 24, 1958	Third baseman	St. Louis Cardinals	
Fernando Valenzuela	September 15, 1980	July 14, 1997	Pitcher	Los Angeles Dodgers, California Angels, Baltimore Orioles, Philadelphia Phillies, San Diego Padres, St. Louis Cardinals	
Julio Valera	September 1, 1990	July 26, 1996	Pitcher	New York Mets, California Angels, Kansas City Royals	
Yohanny Valera	September 13, 2000	September 29, 2000	Catcher	Montreal Expos	
Dave Valle	September 7, 1984	September 29, 1996	Catcher	Seattle Mariners, Boston Red Sox, Milwaukee Brewers, Texas Rangers	
Héctor Valle	June 6, 1965	October 3, 1965	Catcher	Los Angeles Dodgers	
Elmer Valo	September 22, 1940	October 1, 1961	Outfielder	Philadelphia/Kansas City Athletics, Philadelphia Phillies, Brooklyn/Los Angeles Dodgers, Cleveland Indians, Washington Senators, Minnesota Twins	
José Valverde	June 1, 2003		Pitcher	Arizona Diamondbacks, Houston Astros, Detroit Tigers	
Clay Van Alstyne	August 20, 1927	May 7, 1928	Pitcher	Washington Senators	
Russ Van Atta	April 25, 1933	May 11, 1939	Pitcher	New York Yankees, St. Louis Browns	
John Van Benschoten	August 18, 2004	July 26, 2008	Pitcher	Pittsburgh Pirates	
Ozzie Van Brabant	April 13, 1954	April 23, 1955	Pitcher	Philadelphia/Kansas City Athletics	
Deacon Van Buren	April 21, 1904	May 15, 1904	Outfielder	Brooklyn Superbas, Philadelphia Phillies	
Jermaine Van Buren	August 31, 2005	August 19, 2006	Pitcher	Chicago Cubs, Boston Red Sox	
Ty Van Burkleo	July 28, 1993	July 30, 1994	First baseman	California Angels, Colorado Rockies	
Al Van Camp	September 11, 1928	June 23, 1932	Utility player	Cleveland Indians, Boston Red Sox	
Chris Van Cuyk	July 16, 1950	August 15, 1952	Pitcher	Brooklyn Dodgers	
Johnny Van Cuyk	September 18, 1947	May 9, 1949	Pitcher	Brooklyn Dodgers	
Fred Van Dusen	September 11, 1955	September 11, 1955	Pinch hitter	Philadelphia Phillies	
Ben Van Dyke	May 11, 1909	September 26, 1912	Pitcher	Philadelphia Phillies, Boston Red Sox	
Bill Van Dyke	April 17, 1890	September 30, 1893	Outfielder	Toledo Maumees, St. Louis Browns (1882–1900), Boston Beaneaters	
Tim Van Egmond	June 26, 1994	September 25, 1996	Pitcher	Boston Red Sox, Milwaukee Brewers	
Jonathan Van Every	May 14, 2008	May 20, 2010	Outfielder	Boston Red Sox	
Dave Van Gorder	June 15, 1982	July 11, 1987	Catcher	Cincinnati Reds, Baltimore Orioles	
George Van Haltren	June 27, 1887	September 26, 1903	Outfielder	Chicago White Stockings, Brooklyn Ward's Wonders, Baltimore Orioles (19th century), Pittsburgh Pirates, New York Giants	
Andy Van Hekken	September 3, 2002	September 27, 2002	Pitcher	Detroit Tigers	
William Van Landingham	May 21, 1994	July 27, 1997	Pitcher	San Francisco Giants	
Jay Van Noy	June 18, 1951	June 28, 1951	Outfielder	St. Louis Cardinals	
Todd Van Poppel	September 11, 1991	October 2, 2004	Pitcher	Oakland Athletics, Detroit Tigers, Texas Rangers, Pittsburgh Pirates, Chicago Cubs, Cincinnati Reds	
Maurice Van Robays	September 7, 1939	September 22, 1946	Outfielder	Pittsburgh Pirates	
Ben Van Ryn	May 9, 1996	September 26, 1998	Pitcher	California Angels, Chicago Cubs, San Diego Padres, Toronto Blue Jays	
Andy Van Slyke	June 17, 1983	October 1, 1995	Outfielder	St. Louis Cardinals, Pittsburgh Pirates, Baltimore Orioles, Philadelphia Phillies	
Ike Van Zandt	August 5, 1901	October 8, 1905	Outfielder	New York Giants, Chicago Cubs, St. Louis Browns	
Dick Van Zant	October 4, 1888	October 15, 1888	Third baseman	Cleveland Blues	
Cory Vance	September 21, 2002	September 26, 2003	Pitcher	Colorado Rockies	
Dazzy Vance β	April 16, 1915	August 14, 1935	Pitcher	Pittsburgh Pirates, New York Yankees, Brooklyn Dodgers/Robins, St. Louis Cardinals, Cincinnati Reds	
Joe Vance	April 18, 1935	August 10, 1935	Pitcher	Chicago White Sox, New York Yankees	
Sandy Vance	April 26, 1970	June 30, 1971	Pitcher	Los Angeles Dodgers	
Carl Vandagrift	May 19, 1914	October 5, 1914	Second baseman	Indianapolis Hoosiers (FL)	
Ed Vande Berg	April 7, 1982	September 30, 1988	Pitcher	Seattle Mariners, Los Angeles Dodgers, Cleveland Indians, Texas Rangers	
Hy Vandenberg	June 8, 1935	September 29, 1945	Pitcher	Boston Red Sox, New York Giants, Chicago Cubs	
Rick VandenHurk	April 10, 2007		Pitcher	Florida Marlins, Baltimore Orioles	
Johnny Vander Meer	April 22, 1937	May 7, 1951	Pitcher	Cincinnati Reds, Chicago Cubs, Cleveland Indians	
John Vander Wal	September 6, 1991	September 27, 2004	Outfielder	Montreal Expos, Colorado Rockies, San Diego Padres, Pittsburgh Pirates, San Francisco Giants, New York Yankees, Milwaukee Brewers, Cincinnati Reds	
Elam Vangilder	September 18, 1919	May 27, 1929	Pitcher	St. Louis Browns, Detroit Tigers	
John Vann	June 11, 1913	June 11, 1913	Pinch hitter	St. Louis Cardinals	
Andy Varga	September 9, 1950	September 23, 1951	Pitcher	Chicago Cubs	
Claudio Vargas	April 26, 2003		Pitcher	Montreal Expos, Washington Nationals, Arizona Diamondbacks, Milwaukee Brewers, New York Mets	
Eddie Vargas	September 8, 1982	September 30, 1984	First baseman	Pittsburgh Pirates	
Jason Vargas	July 14, 2005		Pitcher	Florida Marlins, New York Mets, Seattle Mariners	
Roberto Vargas	April 17, 1955	September 25, 1955	Pitcher	Milwaukee Braves	
Bill Vargus	June 23, 1925	June 26, 1926	Pitcher	Boston Braves	
Jason Varitek	September 24, 1997	September 25, 2011	Catcher	Boston Red Sox	
Buck Varner	September 19, 1952	September 23, 1952	Outfielder	Washington Senators	
Dike Varney	July 3, 1902	July 29, 1902	Pitcher	Cleveland Bronchos	
Pete Varney	August 26, 1973	September 12, 1976	Catcher	Chicago White Sox, Atlanta Braves	
Gary Varsho	July 6, 1988	October 1, 1995	Outfielder	Chicago Cubs, Pittsburgh Pirates, Cincinnati Reds, Philadelphia Phillies	
Anthony Varvaro	September 24, 2010		Pitcher	Seattle Mariners, Atlanta Braves	
Cal Vasbinder	April 27, 1902	May 7, 1902	Pitcher	Cleveland Bronchos	
Anthony Vasquez	August 23, 2011		Pitcher	Seattle Mariners	
Esmerling Vásquez	April 26, 2009		Pitcher	Arizona Diamondbacks	
Jorge Vásquez	August 13, 2004	July 2, 2005	Pitcher	Kansas City Royals, Atlanta Braves	
Rafael Vásquez	April 6, 1979	May 10, 1979	Pitcher	Seattle Mariners	
Virgil Vasquez	May 13, 2007		Pitcher	Detroit Tigers, Pirates	
Jim Vatcher	May 30, 1990	October 4, 1992	Outfielder	Philadelphia Phillies, Atlanta Braves, San Diego Padres	
Arky Vaughan β	April 17, 1932	September 22, 1948	Shortstop	Pittsburgh Pirates, Brooklyn Dodgers	
Charlie Vaughan	September 3, 1966	June 1, 1969	Pitcher	Atlanta Braves	
Glenn Vaughan	September 20, 1963	September 29, 1963	Shortstop	Houston Colt .45s	
Porter Vaughan	June 16, 1940	April 21, 1946	Pitcher	Philadelphia Athletics	
Bobby Vaughn	June 12, 1909	October 3, 1915	Second baseman	New York Highlanders, St. Louis Terriers	
DeWayne Vaughn	April 17, 1988	July 4, 1988	Pitcher	Texas Rangers	
Farmer Vaughn	October 7, 1886	July 15, 1899	Catcher	Cincinnati Red Stockings (AA), Louisville Colonels, New York Giants (PL), Cincinnati Kelly's Killers, Milwaukee Brewers (AA), Cincinnati Reds	
Fred Vaughn	August 20, 1944	September 20, 1945	Second baseman	Washington Senators	
Greg Vaughn	August 10, 1989	July 10, 2003	Outfielder	Milwaukee Brewers, San Diego Padres, Cincinnati Reds, Tampa Bay Devil Rays, Colorado Rockies	
Hippo Vaughn	June 19, 1908	July 9, 1921	Pitcher	New York Highlanders, Washington Senators, Chicago Cubs	
Mo Vaughn	June 27, 1991	May 2, 2003	First baseman	Boston Red Sox, Anaheim Angels, New York Mets	
Roy Vaughn	July 1, 1934	July 5, 1934	Pitcher	Philadelphia Athletics	
Javier Vázquez	April 3, 1998	September 27, 2011	Pitcher	Montreal Expos, New York Yankees, Arizona Diamondbacks, Chicago White Sox, Atlanta Braves, Florida Marlins	
Ramón Vázquez	September 7, 2001		Utility infielder	Seattle Mariners, San Diego Padres, Boston Red Sox, Cleveland Indians, Texas Rangers, Pittsburgh Pirates	
Al Veach	September 22, 1935	September 29, 1935	Pitcher	Philadelphia Athletics	
Bobby Veach	August 6, 1912	October 2, 1925	Outfielder	Detroit Tigers, Boston Red Sox, New York Yankees, Washington Senators	
Peek-A-Boo Veach	August 24, 1884	July 25, 1890	First baseman	Kansas City Cowboys (UA), Louisville Colonels, Cleveland Spiders, Pittsburgh Alleghenys	
Coot Veal	July 30, 1958	June 20, 1963	Shortstop	Detroit Tigers, Washington Senators (1961–1971), Pittsburgh Pirates	
Donnie Veal	April 7, 2009		Pitcher	Pittsburgh Pirates	
Bob Veale	April 16, 1962	September 8, 1974	Pitcher	Pittsburgh Pirates, Boston Red Sox	
Lou Vedder	September 18, 1920	September 18, 1920	Pitcher	Detroit Tigers	
Jesús Vega	September 5, 1979	September 8, 1982	Designated hitter	Minnesota Twins	
Al Veigel	September 21, 1939	September 25, 1939	Pitcher	Boston Bees	
Bucky Veil	April 19, 1903	April 23, 1904	Pitcher	Pittsburgh Pirates	
Jorge Velandia	June 20, 1997	July 13, 2008	Utility infielder	San Diego Padres, Oakland Athletics, New York Mets, Tampa Bay Devil Rays, Toronto Blue Jays, Cleveland Indians	
Randy Velarde	August 20, 1987	September 29, 2002	Second baseman	New York Yankees, California/Anaheim Angels, Oakland Athletics, Texas Rangers	
Guillermo Velasquez	September 14, 1992	October 3, 1993	First baseman	San Diego Padres	
Carlos Velázquez	July 20, 1973	September 29, 1973	Pitcher	Milwaukee Brewers	
Freddie Velázquez	April 20, 1969	September 30, 1973	Catcher	Seattle Pilots, Atlanta Braves	
Gil Velazquez	September 25, 2008		Second baseman	Boston Red Sox, Los Angeles Angels of Anaheim	
Eugenio Vélez	September 5, 2007		Second baseman	San Francisco Giants, Los Angeles Dodgers	
Otto Vélez	September 4, 1973	August 7, 1983	Outfielder	New York Yankees, Toronto Blue Jays, Cleveland Indians	
Pat Veltman	April 17, 1926	September 30, 1934	Catcher	Chicago White Sox, New York Giants, Boston Braves, Pittsburgh Pirates	
Max Venable	April 8, 1979	October 6, 1991	Outfielder	San Francisco Giants, Montreal Expos, Cincinnati Reds, California Angels	
Will Venable	August 29, 2008		Outfielder	San Diego Padres	
Mike Venafro	April 24, 1999	September 30, 2006	Pitcher	Texas Rangers, Oakland Athletics, Tampa Bay Devil Rays, Los Angeles Dodgers, Colorado Rockies	
Jonny Venters	April 17, 2010		Pitcher	Atlanta Braves	
Mike Vento	September 13, 2005	June 9, 2006	Outfielder	New York Yankees, Washington Nationals	
Robin Ventura	September 12, 1989	October 2, 2004	Third baseman	Chicago White Sox, New York Mets, New York Yankees, Los Angeles Dodgers	
Vince Ventura	May 8, 1945	June 15, 1945	Outfielder	Washington Senators	
Yordano Ventura	September 17, 2013	September 30, 2016	Pitcher	Kansas City Royals	
Darío Veras	July 31, 1996	September 21, 1998	Pitcher	San Diego Padres, Boston Red Sox	
José Veras	August 5, 2006		Pitcher	New York Yankees, Cleveland Indians, Florida Marlins, Pittsburgh Pirates	
Quilvio Veras	April 25, 1995	July 13, 2001	Second baseman	Florida Marlins, San Diego Padres, Atlanta Braves	
Wilton Veras	July 1, 1999	June 30, 2000	Third baseman	Boston Red Sox	
Emil Verban	April 18, 1944	October 1, 1950	Second baseman	St. Louis Cardinals, Philadelphia Phillies, Chicago Cubs, Boston Braves	
Joe Verbanic	July 22, 1966	May 9, 1970	Pitcher	Philadelphia Phillies, New York Yankees	
Gene Verble	April 17, 1951	June 27, 1953	Shortstop	Washington Senators	
Al Verdel	April 20, 1944	April 20, 1944	Pitcher	Philadelphia Phillies	
Frank Verdi	May 10, 1953	May 10, 1953	Shortstop	New York Yankees	
Tommy Vereker	June 17, 1915	June 22, 1915	Pitcher	Baltimore Terrapins	
Dave Veres	May 10, 1994	September 27, 2003	Pitcher	Houston Astros, Montreal Expos, Colorado Rockies, St. Louis Cardinals, Chicago Cubs	
Randy Veres	July 1, 1989	June 23, 1997	Pitcher	Milwaukee Brewers, Chicago Cubs, Florida Marlins, Detroit Tigers, Kansas City Royals	
Johnny Vergez	April 14, 1931	June 13, 1936	Third baseman	New York Giants, Philadelphia Phillies, St. Louis Cardinals	
John Verhoeven	July 6, 1976	October 4, 1981	Pitcher	California Angels, Chicago White Sox, Minnesota Twins	
Justin Verlander	July 4, 2005		Pitcher	Detroit Tigers	
Jamie Vermilyea	April 22, 2007		Pitcher	Toronto Blue Jays	
Joe Vernon	July 20, 1912	May 15, 1914	Pitcher	Chicago Cubs, Brooklyn Tip-Tops	
Mickey Vernon	July 8, 1939	September 27, 1960	First baseman	Washington Senators, Cleveland Indians, Boston Red Sox, Milwaukee Braves, Pittsburgh Pirates	
Zoilo Versalles	August 1, 1959	September 28, 1971	Shortstop	Washington Senators, Minnesota Twins, Los Angeles Dodgers, Washington Senators (1961–1971), Atlanta Braves	
Tom Veryzer	August 14, 1973	September 30, 1984	Shortstop	Detroit Tigers, Cleveland Indians, New York Mets, Chicago Cubs	
Bob Veselic	September 18, 1980	October 3, 1981	Pitcher	Minnesota Twins	
Lee Viau	April 22, 1888	August 27, 1892	Pitcher	Cincinnati Red Stockings (AA), Cincinnati Reds, Cleveland Spiders, Louisville Colonels, Boston Beaneaters	
Dayán Viciedo	June 20, 2010		Pitcher	Chicago White Sox	
Ernie Vick	June 29, 1922	September 25, 1926	Catcher	St. Louis Cardinals	
Sammy Vick	September 20, 1917	September 24, 1921	Outfielder	New York Yankees, Boston Red Sox	
Rube Vickers	September 21, 1902	October 2, 1909	Pitcher	Cincinnati Reds, Brooklyn Superbas, Philadelphia Athletics	
Tom Vickery	April 21, 1890	July 29, 1893	Pitcher	Philadelphia Phillies, Chicago Colts, Baltimore Orioles (19th century)	
George Vico	April 20, 1948	October 1, 1949	First baseman	Detroit Tigers	
Shane Victorino	April 2, 2003		Outfielder	San Diego Padres, Philadelphia Phillies	
José Vidal	September 5, 1966	May 16, 1969	Outfielder	Cleveland Indians, Seattle Pilots	
José Vidro	June 8, 1997	August 4, 2008	Second baseman	Montreal Expos, Washington Nationals, Seattle Mariners	
Eduardo Villacis	May 1, 2004	May 1, 2004	Pitcher	Kansas City Royals	
Brandon Villafuerte	May 23, 2000	July 21, 2004	Pitcher	Detroit Tigers, Texas Rangers, San Diego Padres, Arizona Diamondbacks	
Carlos Villanueva	May 23, 2006		Pitcher	Milwaukee Brewers, Toronto Blue Jays	
Elih Villanueva	June 15, 2011		Pitcher	Florida Marlins	
Héctor Villanueva	June 1, 1990	June 13, 1993	Catcher	Chicago Cubs, St. Louis Cardinals	
Henry Villar	September 10, 2010		Pitcher	Houston Astros	
Brayan Villarreal	April 2, 2011		Pitcher	Detroit Tigers	
Óscar Villarreal	March 31, 2003		Pitcher	Arizona Diamondbacks, Atlanta Braves, Houston Astros	
Ismael Villegas	July 3, 2000	July 3, 2000	Pitcher	Atlanta Braves	
Ron Villone	April 28, 1995	October 4, 2009	Pitcher	Seattle Mariners, San Diego Padres, Milwaukee Brewers, Cleveland Indians, Cincinnati Reds, Colorado Rockies, Houston Astros, Pittsburgh Pirates, Florida Marlins, New York Yankees, St. Louis Cardinals, Washington Nationals	
Fernando Viña	April 10, 1993	May 11, 2004	Second baseman	Seattle Mariners, New York Mets, Milwaukee Brewers, St. Louis Cardinals, Detroit Tigers	
Bob Vines	September 3, 1924	June 2, 1925	Pitcher	St. Louis Cardinals, Philadelphia Phillies	
Dave Vineyard	July 18, 1964	September 23, 1964	Pitcher	Baltimore Orioles	
Ken Vining	May 23, 2001	July 5, 2001	Pitcher	Chicago White Sox	
Charlie Vinson	September 19, 1966	October 2, 1966	First baseman	California Angels	
Rube Vinson	September 27, 1904	May 7, 1906	Outfielder	Cleveland Naps, Chicago White Sox	
Bill Vinton	July 3, 1884	September 16, 1885	Pitcher	Philadelphia Quakers, Philadelphia Athletics (American Association)	
Frank Viola	June 6, 1982	May 28, 1996	Pitcher	Minnesota Twins, New York Mets, Boston Red Sox, Cincinnati Reds, Toronto Blue Jays	
Pedro Viola	September 8, 2009	July 7, 2011	Pitcher	Cincinnati Reds, Baltimore Orioles	
Jim Viox	May 9, 1912	July 22, 1916	Second baseman	Pittsburgh Pirates	
Bill Virdon	April 12, 1955	July 31, 1968	Outfielder	St. Louis Cardinals, Pittsburgh Pirates	
Ozzie Virgil Jr.	October 5, 1980	April 24, 1990	Catcher	Philadelphia Phillies, Atlanta Braves, Toronto Blue Jays	
Ozzie Virgil Sr.	September 23, 1956	June 27, 1969	Third baseman	New York Giants, Detroit Tigers, Kansas City Athletics, Baltimore Orioles, Pittsburgh Pirates, San Francisco Giants	
Jake Virtue	July 21, 1890	July 20, 1894	First baseman	Cleveland Spiders	
Joe Visner	July 4, 1885	June 1, 1891	Outfielder	Baltimore Orioles (19th century), Brooklyn Bridegrooms, Pittsburgh Burghers, Washington Senators (1891–99), St. Louis Browns (1882–1900)	
Joe Vitelli	May 30, 1944	May 30, 1945	Pitcher	Pittsburgh Pirates	
Joe Vitiello	April 29, 1995	September 28, 2003	Designated hitter	Kansas City Royals, San Diego Padres, Montreal Expos	
Joe Vitko	September 18, 1992	September 28, 1992	Pitcher	New York Mets	
Ossie Vitt	April 11, 1912	October 1, 1921	Third baseman	Detroit Tigers, Boston Red Sox	
José Vizcaíno	September 10, 1989	October 1, 2006	Shortstop	Los Angeles Dodgers, Chicago Cubs, New York Mets, Cleveland Indians, San Francisco Giants, New York Yankees, Houston Astros, St. Louis Cardinals	
Luis Vizcaíno	July 23, 1999		Pitcher	Oakland Athletics, Milwaukee Brewers, Chicago White Sox, Arizona Diamondbacks, New York Yankees, Colorado Rockies, Cleveland Indians	
Arodys Vizcaíno	August 10, 2011		Pitcher	Atlanta Braves	
Omar Vizquel	April 3, 1989		Shortstop	Seattle Mariners, Cleveland Indians, San Francisco Giants, Texas Rangers, Chicago White Sox	
Otto Vogel	June 5, 1923	September 29, 1924	Outfielder	Chicago Cubs	
Ryan Vogelsong	September 2, 2000		Pitcher	San Francisco Giants, Pittsburgh Pirates	
Jack Voigt	August 3, 1992	July 27, 1998	Outfielder	Baltimore Orioles, Texas Rangers, Milwaukee Brewers, Oakland Athletics	
Ollie Voigt	April 19, 1924	May 31, 1924	Pitcher	St. Louis Browns	
Bill Voiselle	September 1, 1942	July 8, 1950	Pitcher	New York Giants, Boston Braves, Chicago Cubs	
Clyde Vollmer	May 31, 1942	September 1, 1954	Outfielder	Cincinnati Reds, Washington Senators, Boston Red Sox	
Edinson Vólquez	August 30, 2005		Pitcher	Texas Rangers, Cincinnati Reds	
Chris Volstad	July 6, 2008		Pitcher	Florida Marlins	
Jake Volz	September 28, 1901	September 2, 1908	Pitcher	Boston Americans, Boston Beaneaters, Cincinnati Reds	
Tony Von Fricken	May 9, 1890	May 9, 1890	Pitcher	Boston Beaneaters	
Bruce Von Hoff	September 28, 1965	October 1, 1967	Pitcher	Houston Astros	
Fritz Von Kolnitz	April 18, 1914	September 17, 1916	Third baseman	Cincinnati Reds, Chicago White Sox	
Dave Von Ohlen	May 13, 1983	June 21, 1987	Pitcher	St. Louis Cardinals, Cleveland Indians, Oakland Athletics	
Cy Vorhees	April 17, 1902	September 18, 1902	Pitcher	Philadelphia Phillies, Washington Senators	
Ed Vosberg	September 17, 1986	April 10, 2002	Pitcher	San Diego Padres, San Francisco Giants, Oakland Athletics, Texas Rangers, Florida Marlins, Arizona Diamondbacks, Philadelphia Phillies, Montreal Expos	
Joe Vosmik	September 13, 1930	July 23, 1944	Outfielder	Cleveland Indians, St. Louis Browns, Boston Red Sox, Brooklyn Dodgers, Washington Senators	
Alex Voss	April 17, 1884	September 12, 1884	Pitcher	Washington Nationals (UA), Kansas City Cowboys (UA)	
Bill Voss	September 14, 1965	September 23, 1972	Outfielder	Chicago White Sox, California Angels, Milwaukee Brewers, Oakland Athletics, St. Louis Cardinals	
Joey Votto	September 4, 2007		First baseman	Cincinnati Reds	
Rip Vowinkel	September 5, 1905	October 7, 1905	Pitcher	Cincinnati Reds	
Brad Voyles	September 8, 2001	September 27, 2003	Pitcher	Kansas City Royals	
Phil Voyles	September 4, 1929	October 6, 1929	Outfielder	Boston Braves	
Pete Vuckovich	August 3, 1975	October 2, 1986	Pitcher	Chicago White Sox, Toronto Blue Jays, St. Louis Cardinals, Milwaukee Brewers	
George Vukovich	April 13, 1980	October 6, 1985	Outfielder	Philadelphia Phillies, Cleveland Indians	
John Vukovich	September 11, 1970	August 23, 1981	Third baseman	Philadelphia Phillies, Milwaukee Brewers, Cincinnati Reds	
