= 1890 Cincinnati Reds season =

1890 Cincinnati Reds
- League: National League
- Ballpark: League Park
- City: Cincinnati
- Record: 77–55 (.583)
- League place: 4th
- Owner: Aaron S. Stern & Al Johnson
- Manager: Tom Loftus

The 1890 Cincinnati Reds season was a season in American baseball. The team finished fourth in the National League with a record of 77–55, 10½ behind the Brooklyn Bridegrooms. Directly after the season ended, owner Aaron Stern sold the club to Al Johnson.

== Regular season ==
After playing eight seasons in the American Association, the Cincinnati Red Stockings jumped to the National League for the 1890 season, and renamed themselves the Cincinnati Reds. The Reds hired Tom Loftus as their new manager. He last managed the Cleveland Spiders in 1889, leading them to a 61–72 record and a sixth-place finish in the National League.

In the off-season, the Reds acquired Lefty Marr from the Columbus Solons for $2000. Marr had hit .306 with a league high 15 triples for the Solons in 1889. He had also appeared in eight games with the Red Stockings in 1886. The team also purchased the contract of pitcher Frank Foreman from the Baltimore Orioles. Foreman was 23–21 with a 3.52 with the Orioles. Cincinnati also signed two 21-year-olds, catcher Jerry Harrington and pitcher Billy Rhines. Joe Knight, who last appeared in the majors with the Philadelphia Quakers in 1884 as a pitcher, was signed to play the outfield.

John Reilly led the club offensively, hitting .300 with team highs with six home runs and 86 RBI. Bid McPhee had a .256 average with three homers and 39 RBI, as well as team highs with 125 runs and 55 stolen bases. Knight led the club with a .312 average with four homers and 67 RBI in his only season in the majors. Rhines led the pitching staff, as he had a 28–17 record with league best 1.95 ERA.

=== Season summary ===
The Reds played their first National League game on April 19, 1890. Despite a home run from Bug Holliday, Cincinnati lost to the Chicago Colts by a 5–4 score. After hovering around the .500 level, as the Reds had a record of 11–11 after twenty-two games, the team went on a 22–2 run to boost their record to 33–13, and take a four-game lead over the second place Brooklyn Bridegrooms. Cincinnati would hold on to their first place lead until going into a slump in which the Reds lost ten of eleven games to fall into fourth place, 5.5 games out of first. By the time the season ended, the Reds had a 77–55 record, finishing in fourth place, 10½ games behind the Bridegrooms.

=== Season standings ===
National League
Team	W	L	Pct.	GB	Home	Road
Brooklyn Bridegrooms	86	43	.667	—	58‍–‍16	28‍–‍27
Chicago Colts	83	53	.610	6½	48‍–‍24	35‍–‍29
Philadelphia Phillies	78	53	.595	9	54‍–‍21	24‍–‍32
Cincinnati Reds	77	55	.583	10½	50‍–‍23	27‍–‍32
Boston Beaneaters	76	57	.571	12	43‍–‍23	33‍–‍34
New York Giants	63	68	.481	24	37‍–‍27	26‍–‍41
Cleveland Spiders	44	88	.333	43½	30‍–‍37	14‍–‍51
Pittsburgh Alleghenys	23	113	.169	66½	14‍–‍25	9‍–‍88

=== Record vs. opponents ===
1890 National League record Sources:
Team	BSN	BRO	CHI	CIN	CLE	NYG	PHI	PIT
Boston	—	6–11	8–11	11–8	13–7	11–8–1	11–9	16–3
Brooklyn	11–6	—	11–9	9–7	17–3	10–8	10–8	18–2
Chicago	11–8	9–11	—	12–8–2	13–7	13–6	8–10–1	17–3
Cincinnati	8–11	7–9	8–12–2	—	13–4	14–6	11–9	16–4
Cleveland	7–13	3–17	7–13	4–13	—	6–12–2	5–14–1	12–6–1
New York	8–11–1	8–10	6–13	6–14	12–6–2	—	6–11	17–3–1
Philadelphia	9–11	8–10	10–8–1	9–11	14–5–1	11–6	—	17–2
Pittsburgh	3–16	2–18	3–17	4–16	6–12–1	3–17–1	2–17	—

=== Game log ===
Legend
Reds Win	Reds Loss	Game Tied/Postponed

1890 Game Log: 77–55 (Home: 50–23; Away: 27–32)
April: 4–4 (Home: 2–2; Away: 2–2)

#	Date	Opponent	Score	Stadium	Attendance	Record	Streak
1	April 19	Colts	1–5	League Park	N/A	0-1	L1
2	April 21	Colts	9–4	League Park	N/A	1-1	W1
3	April 22	Colts	3–13	League Park	N/A	1-2	L1
4	April 23	Colts	9–6	League Park	N/A	2-2	W1
-	April 24	@ Alleghenys	Postponed (rain; site change); Makeup: September 11				
5	April 25	@ Alleghenys	10–1	Recreation Park	N/A	3-2	W1
-	April 26	@ Alleghenys	Postponed (rain; site change); Makeup: September 12				
6	April 28	@ Alleghenys	2–6	Recreation Park	N/A	3-3	L1
7	April 29	@ Spiders	2–3	National League Park	N/A	3-4	L2
8	April 30	@ Spiders	4–0	National League Park	N/A	4-4	W1

May: 14–8 (Home: 2–2; Away: 12–6)

#	Date	Opponent	Score	Stadium	Attendance	Record	Streak
9	May 1	@ Spiders	12–11	National League Park	N/A	5-4	W2
10	May 2	@ Spiders	6–1	National League Park	N/A	6-4	W3
-	May 3	@ Colts	Postponed (rain); Makeup: May 8				
11	May 5	@ Colts	2–2	West Side Park	125	6-4	W3
12	May 6	@ Colts	5–6	West Side Park	1,635	6-5	L1
13	May 7	@ Colts	5–2	West Side Park	386	7-5	W1
14	May 8	@ Colts	9–18	West Side Park	390	7-6	L1
15	May 9	Alleghenys	10–5	League Park	N/A	8-6	W1
16	May 10	Alleghenys	11–1	League Park	N/A	9-6	W2
17	May 12	Alleghenys	3–5	League Park	N/A	9-7	L1
18	May 13	Alleghenys	0–4	League Park	N/A	9-8	L2
-	May 15	@ Phillites	Postponed (rain; site change); Makeup: September 23				
19	May 16	@ Phillies	5–1	Philadelphia Base Ball Grounds	N/A	10-8	W1
20	May 17	@ Phillies	4–6	Philadelphia Base Ball Grounds	N/A	10-9	L1
21	May 19	@ Phillies	9–6	Philadelphia Base Ball Grounds	N/A	11-9	W1
22	May 21	@ Bridegrooms	4–19	Washington Park	N/A	11-10	L1
23	May 22	@ Bridegrooms	4–6	Washington Park	N/A	11-11	L2
24	May 23	@ Bridegrooms	7–2	Washington Park	N/A	12-11	W1
25	May 24	@ Beaneaters	7–5	South End Grounds	N/A	13-11	W2
26	May 26	@ Beaneaters	4–2	South End Grounds	N/A	14-11	W3
27	May 28	@ Beaneaters	0–1	South End Grounds	N/A	14-12	L1
28	May 29	@ Giants	7–6	Polo Grounds	N/A	15-12	W1
29	May 30 1	@ Giants	3–1	Polo Grounds	678	16-12	W2
30	May 30 2	@ Giants	1–0	Polo Grounds	3,759	17-12	W3
31	May 31	@ Giants	12–8	Polo Grounds	N/A	18-12	W4

June: 19–6 (Home: 17–5; Away: 2–1)

#	Date	Opponent	Score	Stadium	Attendance	Record	Streak
32	June 2	@ Spiders	4–3	National League Park	N/A	19-12	W5
33	June 3	@ Spiders	5–2	National League Park	N/A	20-12	W6
34	June 4	@ Spiders	1–3	National League Park	N/A	20-13	L1
-	June 5	@ Alleghenys	Postponed (site change); Makeup: June 5				
35	June 5	Alleghenys	9–1	League Park	1,200	21-13	W1
-	June 6	@ Alleghenys	Postponed (site change); Makeup: June 6				
36	June 6	Alleghenys	9–5	League Park	N/A	22-13	W2
-	June 7	@ Alleghenys	Postponed (site change); Makeup: June 7				
37	June 7	Alleghenys	6–2	League Park	N/A	23-13	W3
38	June 9	Alleghenys	8–2	League Park	N/A	24-13	W4
39	June 10	Alleghenys	9–2	League Park	N/A	25-13	W5
40	June 11	Alleghenys	5–1	League Park	N/A	26-13	W6
41	June 12	Spiders	8–0	League Park	1,611	27-13	W7
42	June 13	Spiders	7–5	League Park	N/A	28-13	W8
43	June 14	Spiders	9–0	League Park	N/A	29-13	W9
44	June 16	Spiders	7–3	League Park	N/A	30-13	W10
45	June 17	Colts	3–0	League Park	N/A	31-13	W11
46	June 18	Colts	6–2	League Park	N/A	32-13	W12
47	June 19	Colts	4–2	League Park	N/A	33-13	W13
48	June 20	Beaneaters	2–4	League Park	N/A	33-14	L1
49	June 21	Beaneaters	4–1	League Park	N/A	34-14	W1
50	June 23	Beaneaters	4–12	League Park	N/A	34-15	L1
51	June 24	Beaneaters	0–2	League Park	N/A	34-16	L2
52	June 25	Giants	2–1	League Park	2,600	35-16	W1
53	June 26	Giants	8–5	League Park	N/A	36-16	W2
54	June 27	Giants	4–8	League Park	N/A	36-17	L1
55	June 28	Giants	12–3	League Park	N/A	37-17	W1
56	June 30	Bridegrooms	6–8	League Park	N/A	37-18	L1

July: 12–15 (Home: 10–5; Away: 2–10)

#	Date	Opponent	Score	Stadium	Attendance	Record	Streak
57	July 1	Bridegrooms	3–0	League Park	N/A	38-18	W1
58	July 2	Bridegrooms	6–1	League Park	1,928	39-18	W2
59	July 3	Bridegrooms	9–6	League Park	N/A	40-18	W3
60	July 4 1	Phillies	2–11	League Park	N/A	40-19	L1
61	July 4 2	Phillies	7–1	League Park	14,817	41-19	W1
62	July 5	Phillies	6–9	League Park	N/A	41-20	L1
63	July 7	@ Phillies	3–1	Philadelphia Base Ball Grounds	N/A	42-20	W1
64	July 8	@ Phillies	4–9	Philadelphia Base Ball Grounds	N/A	42-21	L1
65	July 9	@ Phillies	1–6	Philadelphia Base Ball Grounds	N/A	42-22	L2
66	July 10	@ Bridegrooms	3–5	Washington Park	N/A	42-23	L3
67	July 11	@ Bridegrooms	2–9	Washington Park	N/A	42-24	L4
68	July 12	@ Bridegrooms	1–7	Washington Park	N/A	42-25	L5
69	July 14	@ Giants	6–1	Polo Grounds	N/A	43-25	W1
70	July 15	@ Giants	3–7	Polo Grounds	N/A	43-26	L1
71	July 16	@ Giants	8–12	Polo Grounds	N/A	43-27	L2
72	July 17	@ Beaneaters	3–6	South End Grounds	N/A	43-28	L3
73	July 18	@ Beaneaters	3–9	South End Grounds	N/A	43-29	L4
74	July 19	@ Beaneaters	2–6	South End Grounds	N/A	43-30	L5
75	July 21	Bridegrooms	20–11	League Park	N/A	44-30	W1
76	July 22	Bridegrooms	5–16	League Park	N/A	44-31	L1
77	July 24	Giants	7–5	League Park	N/A	45-31	W1
78	July 25	Giants	10–6	League Park	N/A	46-31	W2
79	July 26	Giants	5–1	League Park	2,108	47-31	W3
80	July 28	Beaneaters	1–2	League Park	N/A	47-32	L1
81	July 29	Beaneaters	11–3	League Park	N/A	48-32	W1
82	July 30	Beaneaters	0–3	League Park	N/A	48-33	L1
83	July 31	Phillies	8–6	League Park	N/A	49-33	W1

August: 15–8 (Home: 8–3; Away: 7–5)

#	Date	Opponent	Score	Stadium	Attendance	Record	Streak
84	August 1	Phillies	4–5	League Park	N/A	49-34	L1
85	August 2	Phillies	11–3	League Park	N/A	50-34	W1
86	August 4	Phillies	7–5	League Park	N/A	51-34	W2
-	August 6	@ Alleghenys	Postponed (site change); Makeup: August 6				
87	August 6	Alleghenys	16–3	League Park	N/A	52-34	W3
-	August 7	@ Alleghenys	Postponed (site change); Makeup: August 7				
88	August 7	Alleghenys	23–17	League Park	N/A	53-34	W4
-	August 8	@ Alleghenys	Postponed (site change); Makeup: August 8				
89	August 8	Alleghenys	9–6	League Park	N/A	54-34	W5
90	August 9	@ Spiders	4–5	National League Park	N/A	54-35	L1
91	August 11	@ Spiders	9–7	National League Park	N/A	55-35	W1
92	August 12	@ Spiders	2–1	National League Park	N/A	56-35	W2
93	August 13	Colts	4–6	League Park	N/A	56-36	L1
94	August 14	Colts	2–1	League Park	N/A	57-36	W1
95	August 15	Colts	2–9	League Park	N/A	57-37	L1
96	August 16	Spiders	10–0	League Park	N/A	58-37	W1
97	August 18	Spiders	14–3	League Park	N/A	59-37	W2
98	August 21	@ Giants	5–3	Polo Grounds	N/A	60-37	W3
99	August 22	@ Giants	3–4	Polo Grounds	N/A	60-38	L1
100	August 23	@ Giants	3–7	Polo Grounds	2,034	60-39	L2
101	August 25	@ Bridegrooms	4–1	Washington Park	N/A	61-39	W1
102	August 26	@ Bridegrooms	0–3	Washington Park	N/A	61-40	L1
103	August 27	@ Bridegrooms	8–1	Washington Park	N/A	62-40	W1
104	August 28	@ Beaneaters	7–0	South End Grounds	N/A	63-40	W2
105	August 29	@ Beaneaters	1–2	South End Grounds	N/A	63-41	L1
106	August 30	@ Beaneaters	6–5	South End Grounds	N/A	64-41	W1

September/October: 13–14 (Home: 11–6; Away: 2–8)

#	Date	Opponent	Score	Stadium	Attendance	Record	Streak
107	September 1 1	@ Phillies	1–2	Philadelphia Base Ball Grounds	N/A	64-42	L1
108	September 1 2	@ Phillies	8–5	Philadelphia Base Ball Grounds	N/A	65-42	W1
109	September 2	@ Phillies	12–14	Philadelphia Base Ball Grounds	N/A	65-43	L1
110	September 4	@ Colts	4–7	West Side Park	2,436	65-44	L2
111	September 5	@ Colts	8–12	West Side Park	910	65-45	L3
112	September 6	@ Colts	0–1	West Side Park	2,972	65-46	L4
113	September 9	Spiders	4–8	League Park	N/A	65-47	L5
114	September 11 1	Alleghenys	2–0	League Park	N/A	66-47	W1
115	September 11 2	Alleghenys	4–1	League Park	N/A	67-47	W2
116	September 12 1	Alleghenys	7–3	League Park	N/A	68-47	W3
117	September 12 2	Alleghenys	11–1	League Park	N/A	69-47	W4
118	September 13	Alleghenys	6–8	League Park	N/A	69-48	L1
119	September 15	@ Colts	3–6	West Side Park	1,847	69-49	L2
120	September 16	@ Colts	2–5	West Side Park	1,328	69-50	L3
121	September 17	@ Colts	6–6	West Side Park	1,541	69-50	L3
122	September 18 1	@ Colts	4–8	West Side Park	2,382	69-51	L4
123	September 18 2	@ Colts	10–5	West Side Park	N/A	70-51	W1
124	September 19	Phillies	5–4	League Park	N/A	71-51	W2
125	September 20	Phillies	9–1	League Park	N/A	72-51	W3
126	September 22	Phillies	5–7	League Park	N/A	72-52	L1
127	September 23	Phillies	4–2	League Park	N/A	73-52	W1
128	September 24	Bridegrooms	1–5	League Park	N/A	73-53	L1
129	September 27	Giants	3–15	League Park	N/A	73-54	L2
130	September 29	Giants	5–4	League Park	N/A	74-54	W1
131	September 30	Giants	5–2	League Park	N/A	75-54	W2
132	October 1	Beaneaters	5–3	League Park	N/A	76-54	W3
133	October 2	Beaneaters	3–7	League Park	N/A	76-55	L1
134	October 3	Beaneaters	8–2	League Park	N/A	77-55	W1
-	October 4	Beaneaters	Postponed (rain); Makeup: October 1				

=== Roster ===
1890 Cincinnati Reds
Roster
Pitchers: John Dolan; Jesse Duryea; Frank Foreman; Billy Rhines; Lee Viau	Catchers: Kid Baldwin; Jerry Harrington; Jim Keenan; Infielders: Ollie Beard; Billy Clingman; Arlie Latham; Bid McPhee; John Reilly	Outfielders: Bug Holliday; Joe Knight; Lefty Marr; Tony Mullane; Hugh Nicol	Manager: Tom Loftus

== Player stats ==
=== Batting ===
==== Starters by position ====
Note: Pos = Position; G = Games played; AB = At bats; H = Hits; Avg. = Batting average; HR = Home runs; RBI = Runs batted in

Pos	Player	G	AB	H	Avg.	HR	RBI
C	Jerry Harrington	65	236	58	.246	1	23
1B	John Reilly	133	553	166	.300	6	86
2B	Bid McPhee	132	528	135	.256	3	39
SS	Ollie Beard	122	492	132	.268	3	72
3B	Arlie Latham	41	164	41	.250	0	15
OF	Joe Knight	127	481	150	.312	4	67
OF	Lefty Marr	130	527	157	.298	1	73
OF	Bug Holliday	131	518	140	.270	4	75

==== Other batters ====
Note: G = Games played; AB = At bats; H = Hits; Avg. = Batting average; HR = Home runs; RBI = Runs batted in

Player	G	AB	H	Avg.	HR	RBI
Tony Mullane	81	286	79	.276	0	34
Jim Keenan	54	202	28	.139	3	19
Hugh Nicol	50	186	39	.210	0	19
Kid Baldwin	22	72	11	.153	0	10
Billy Clingman	7	27	7	.259	0	5

=== Pitching ===
==== Starting pitchers ====
Note: G = Games pitched; IP = Innings pitched; W = Wins; L = Losses; ERA = Earned run average; SO = Strikeouts

Player	G	IP	W	L	ERA	SO
Billy Rhines	46	401.1	28	17	1.95	182
Jesse Duryea	33	274.0	16	12	2.92	108
Tony Mullane	25	209.0	12	10	2.24	91
Frank Foreman	25	198.1	13	10	3.95	57
Lee Viau	13	90.0	7	5	4.50	41
John Dolan	2	18.0	1	1	4.50	9
