= 1890 Boston Beaneaters season =

1890 Boston Beaneaters
- League: National League
- Ballpark: South End Grounds
- City: Boston, Massachusetts
- Record: 76–57 (.571)
- League place: 5th
- Owner: Arthur Soden
- Manager: Frank Selee

The 1890 Boston Beaneaters season was the 20th season of the franchise.

== Regular season ==
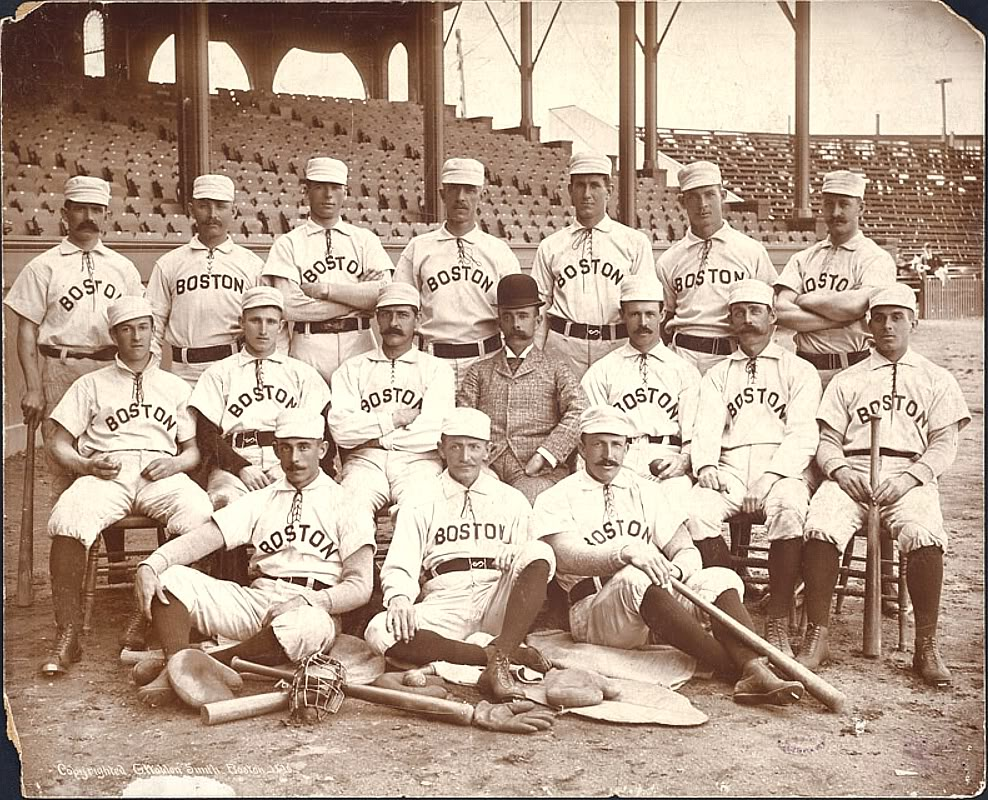
Boston Beaneaters, 1890

=== Season standings ===
National League
Team	W	L	Pct.	GB	Home	Road
Brooklyn Bridegrooms	86	43	.667	—	58‍–‍16	28‍–‍27
Chicago Colts	83	53	.610	6½	48‍–‍24	35‍–‍29
Philadelphia Phillies	78	53	.595	9	54‍–‍21	24‍–‍32
Cincinnati Reds	77	55	.583	10½	50‍–‍23	27‍–‍32
Boston Beaneaters	76	57	.571	12	43‍–‍23	33‍–‍34
New York Giants	63	68	.481	24	37‍–‍27	26‍–‍41
Cleveland Spiders	44	88	.333	43½	30‍–‍37	14‍–‍51
Pittsburgh Alleghenys	23	113	.169	66½	14‍–‍25	9‍–‍88

=== Record vs. opponents ===
1890 National League record Sources:
Team	BSN	BRO	CHI	CIN	CLE	NYG	PHI	PIT
Boston	—	6–11	8–11	11–8	13–7	11–8–1	11–9	16–3
Brooklyn	11–6	—	11–9	9–7	17–3	10–8	10–8	18–2
Chicago	11–8	9–11	—	12–8–2	13–7	13–6	8–10–1	17–3
Cincinnati	8–11	7–9	8–12–2	—	13–4	14–6	11–9	16–4
Cleveland	7–13	3–17	7–13	4–13	—	6–12–2	5–14–1	12–6–1
New York	8–11–1	8–10	6–13	6–14	12–6–2	—	6–11	17–3–1
Philadelphia	9–11	8–10	10–8–1	9–11	14–5–1	11–6	—	17–2
Pittsburgh	3–16	2–18	3–17	4–16	6–12–1	3–17–1	2–17	—

=== Roster ===
1890 Boston Beaneaters
Roster
Pitchers: John Clarkson; Charlie Getzien; Al Lawson; Kid Nichols; John Taber; Tony Von Fricken	Catchers: Charlie Bennett; Charlie Ganzel; Lou Hardie; Infielders: Herman Long; Bobby Lowe; Chippy McGarr; Pop Smith; Tommy Tucker	Outfielders: Steve Brodie; Patsy Donovan; Paul Hines; Al Schellhase; Marty Sullivan	Manager: Frank Selee

== Player stats ==
=== Batting ===
==== Starters by position ====
Note: Pos = Position; G = Games played; AB = At bats; H = Hits; Avg. = Batting average; HR = Home runs; RBI = Runs batted in

Pos	Player	G	AB	H	Avg.	HR	RBI
C	Charlie Bennett	85	281	60	.214	3	40
1B	Tommy Tucker	132	539	159	.295	1	62
2B	Pop Smith	134	463	106	.229	1	53
SS	Herman Long	101	431	108	.251	8	52
3B	Chippy McGarr	121	487	115	.236	1	51
OF	Marty Sullivan	121	505	144	.285	6	61
OF	Paul Hines	69	273	72	.264	2	48
OF	Steve Brodie	132	514	152	.296	0	67

==== Other batters ====
Note: G = Games played; AB = At bats; H = Hits; Avg. = Batting average; HR = Home runs; RBI = Runs batted in

Player	G	AB	H	Avg.	HR	RBI
Bobby Lowe	52	207	58	.280	2	21
Lou Hardie	47	185	42	.227	3	17
Charlie Ganzel	38	163	44	.270	0	24
Patsy Donovan	32	140	36	.257	0	9
Al Schellhase	9	29	4	.138	0	1

=== Pitching ===
==== Starting pitchers ====
Note: G = Games pitched; IP = Innings pitched; W = Wins; L = Losses; ERA = Earned run average; SO = Strikeouts

Player	G	IP	W	L	ERA	SO
Kid Nichols	48	424.0	27	19	2.23	222
John Clarkson	44	383.0	26	18	3.27	138
Charlie Getzien	40	350.0	23	17	3.19	140
Alfred Lawson	1	9.0	0	1	4.00	1
Tony Von Fricken	1	8.0	0	1	10.13	2

==== Other pitchers ====
Note: G = Games pitched; IP = Innings pitched; W = Wins; L = Losses; ERA = Earned run average; SO = Strikeouts

Player	G	IP	W	L	ERA	SO
John Taber	2	13.0	0	1	4.15	3
