= Peter James O'Brien =

Peter James O'Brien may refer to:

- James O'Brien (New Zealand politician) (1874–1947), New Zealand politician with the full name of Peter James O'Brien
- Pete O'Brien (1890s second baseman) (1867–1937), American Major League Baseball player with the full name of Peter James O'Brien

== See also ==
- Peter O'Brien (disambiguation)
