= 1890 Philadelphia Phillies season =

National League season

1890 Philadelphia Phillies
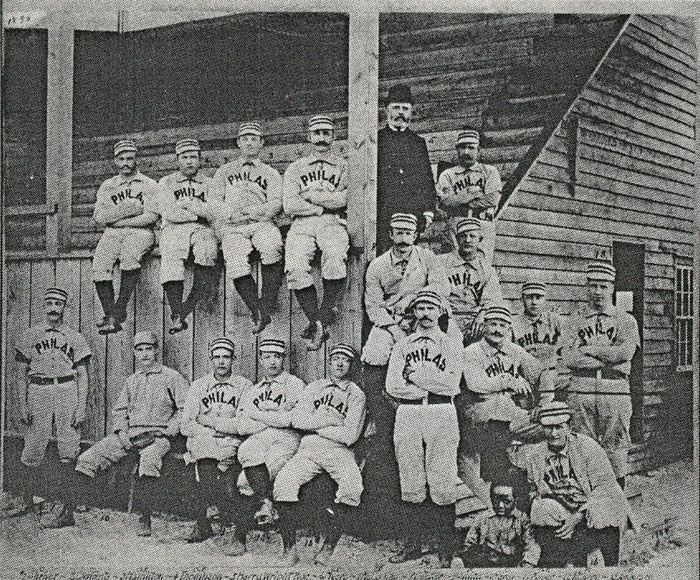
- 1890 Philadelphia Phillies
- League: National League
- Ballpark: Philadelphia Base Ball Grounds
- City: Philadelphia, Pennsylvania
- Record: 78–53 (.595)
- League place: 3rd
- Owners: Al Reach, John Rogers
- Managers: Jack Clements, Al Reach, Bob Allen, Harry Wright

The 1890 Philadelphia Phillies season was a season in Major League Baseball. The Phillies finished third in the National League.

== Regular season ==
=== Season standings ===
National League
Team	W	L	Pct.	GB	Home	Road
Brooklyn Bridegrooms	86	43	.667	—	58‍–‍16	28‍–‍27
Chicago Colts	83	53	.610	6½	48‍–‍24	35‍–‍29
Philadelphia Phillies	78	53	.595	9	54‍–‍21	24‍–‍32
Cincinnati Reds	77	55	.583	10½	50‍–‍23	27‍–‍32
Boston Beaneaters	76	57	.571	12	43‍–‍23	33‍–‍34
New York Giants	63	68	.481	24	37‍–‍27	26‍–‍41
Cleveland Spiders	44	88	.333	43½	30‍–‍37	14‍–‍51
Pittsburgh Alleghenys	23	113	.169	66½	14‍–‍25	9‍–‍88

=== Record vs. opponents ===
1890 National League record Sources:
Team	BSN	BRO	CHI	CIN	CLE	NYG	PHI	PIT
Boston	—	6–11	8–11	11–8	13–7	11–8–1	11–9	16–3
Brooklyn	11–6	—	11–9	9–7	17–3	10–8	10–8	18–2
Chicago	11–8	9–11	—	12–8–2	13–7	13–6	8–10–1	17–3
Cincinnati	8–11	7–9	8–12–2	—	13–4	14–6	11–9	16–4
Cleveland	7–13	3–17	7–13	4–13	—	6–12–2	5–14–1	12–6–1
New York	8–11–1	8–10	6–13	6–14	12–6–2	—	6–11	17–3–1
Philadelphia	9–11	8–10	10–8–1	9–11	14–5–1	11–6	—	17–2
Pittsburgh	3–16	2–18	3–17	4–16	6–12–1	3–17–1	2–17	—

=== Roster ===
1890 Philadelphia Phillies
Roster
Pitchers: Dave Anderson; Sumner Bowman; John Coleman; Bill Day; Duke Esper; Kid Gleason; Jack McFetridge; Phenomenal Smith; Tom Vickery	Catchers: Jack Clements; Pop Schriver; Infielders: Bob Allen; Harry Decker; Ed Mayer; Al McCauley; Frank Motz; Al Myers	Outfielders: Eddie Burke; Bill Gray; Billy Hamilton; Billy Sunday; Sam Thompson	Manager: Jack Clements; Al Reach; Bob Allen; Harry Wright

== Player stats ==
=== Batting ===
==== Starters by position ====
Note: Pos = Position; G = Games played; AB = At bats; H = Hits; Avg. = Batting average; 2B = Doubles; 3B = Triples; HR = Home runs; RBI = Runs batted in; SB = Stolen bases; BB = Walks; K = Strikeouts

Pos	Player	G	AB	H	Avg.	2B	3B	HR	RBI	SB	BB	K
C	Jack Clements	97	381	120	.315	23	8	7	74	10	45	30
1B	Al McCauley	112	418	102	.244	25	7	1	42	8	57	38
2B	Al Myers	117	487	135	.277	29	7	2	81	44	57	46
3B	Ed Mayer	117	484	117	.242	25	5	1	70	20	22	36
SS	Bob Allen	133	456	103	.226	15	11	2	57	13	87	54
OF	Sam Thompson	132	549	172	.313	41	9	4	102	25	42	29
OF	Billy Hamilton	123	496	161	.325	13	9	2	49	102	83	37
OF	Eddie Burke	100	430	113	.263	16	11	4	50	38	49	40

==== Other batters ====
Note: G = Games played; AB = At bats; H = Hits; Avg. = Batting average; 2B = Doubles; 3B = Triples; HR = Home runs; RBI = Runs batted in; SB = Stolen bases; BB = Walks; K = Strikeouts

Player	G	AB	H	Avg.	2B	3B	HR	RBI	SB	BB	K
Pop Schriver	57	223	61	.274	9	6	0	35	9	22	15
Bill Gray	34	128	31	.242	8	4	0	21	5	6	3
Billy Sunday	31	119	31	.261	3	1	0	6	28	18	7
Harry Decker	5	19	7	.368	1	0	0	2	4	4	1
Frank Motz	1	2	0	.000	0	0	0	0	1	1	1

=== Pitching ===
==== Starting pitchers ====
Note: G = Games pitched; IP = Innings pitched; H = Hits; W = Wins; L = Losses; ERA = Earned run average; BB = Walks; SO = Strikeouts

Player	G	IP	H	W	L	ERA	BB	SO
Kid Gleason	60	506.0	479	38	17	2.63	167	222
Tom Vickery	46	382.0	405	24	22	3.44	184	162
Phenomenal Smith	24	204.0	209	8	12	4.28	89	81
Duke Esper	5	41.0	40	5	0	3.07	16	18
Jack McFetridge	1	9.0	5	1	0	1.00	2	4
Sumner Bowman	1	8.0	11	0	0	7.88	2	2
John Coleman	1	1.2	4	0	1	21.60	3	2

==== Other pitchers ====
Note: G = Games pitched; IP = Innings pitched; H = Hits; W = Wins; L = Losses; ERA = Earned run average; BB = Walks; SO = Strikeouts

Player	G	IP	H	W	L	ERA	BB	SO
Bill Day	4	23.2	26	1	1	3.04	12	9
Dave Anderson	3	19.1	31	1	1	7.45	11	7
