= 1904 Memphis Egyptians season =

Egypt

1904 Memphis Egyptians
- League: Southern Association
- Ballpark: Russwood Park
- City: Memphis, Tennessee
- Record: 81–54
- League place: 1st
- Managers: Lew Whistler

The 1904 Memphis Egyptians season represented the Memphis Egyptians baseball team in the Southern Association and won their second consecutive league pennant. The team played its games at Russwood Park. The team's manager was Lew Whistler. The team used a bear, Natch, as a mascot, chained to a tree in Overton Park, which led to the founding of the Memphis Zoo.
