= Jimmy Cooney (1920s shortstop) =

American baseball player (1894–1991)

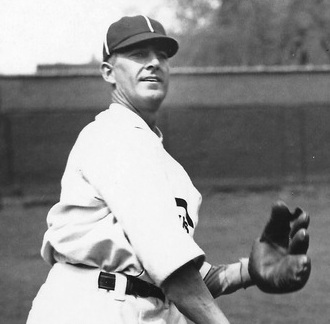
- Cooney, circa 1926
- Shortstop
- Born: August 24, 1894; Cranston, Rhode Island, U.S.
- Died: August 7, 1991 (aged 96); Warwick, Rhode Island, U.S.
- Batted: Right Threw: Right

MLB debut
- September 22, 1917, for the Boston Red Sox

Last MLB appearance
- June 16, 1928, for the Boston Braves

MLB statistics
- Batting average: .262
- Home runs: 2
- Runs batted in: 150
- Stats at Baseball Reference

Teams
- Boston Red Sox (1917); New York Giants (1919); St. Louis Cardinals (1924–1925); Chicago Cubs (1926–1927); Philadelphia Phillies (1927); Boston Braves (1928)

James Edward Cooney (August 24, 1894 – August 7, 1991), nicknamed "Scoops", was an American shortstop in Major League Baseball who played for six different teams between 1917 and 1928. Listed at 5 ft 11 in (1.80 m), 160 lb., Cooney batted and threw right-handed. His father Jimmy Sr. and younger brother Johnny also played in the Major Leagues.

A native of Cranston, Rhode Island, Cooney reached the Majors in 1917 with the Boston Red Sox, spending part of the season with them before playing with the New York Giants in 1919. After that, he spent four years with the Milwaukee Brewers of the American Association, setting a personal mark with 12 consecutive hits in 1923.

Cooney came back to play once again in the Major Leagues with the St. Louis Cardinals (1924–1925), Chicago Cubs (1926–1927), Philadelphia Phillies (1927) and Boston Braves (1928). His most productive season came in 1924 with St. Louis, when he hit a career-high .295 in 110 games including 20 doubles, eight triples, 57 runs batted in and 12 stolen bases, also career-numbers.

In a seven-season career, Cooney was a .262 hitter (413-for-1575) with two home runs and 150 RBI in 448 games, including 64 doubles, 16 triples, and 30 stolen bases.

Cooney died in Warwick, Rhode Island, on August 7, 1991, at the age of 96.

== Triple plays ==
While in Chicago, Cooney entered the record books as the sixth player in the modern era to turn an unassisted triple play. On May 30, 1927, in the fourth inning of a game against Pittsburgh, Cooney caught a line drive hit by Paul Waner, stepped on second base to retire Lloyd Waner, and then tagged Clyde Barnhart coming down from first base.

One day after Cooney's fielding gem, Johnny Neun also turned an unassisted triple play. Despite their joint fame, Cooney and Neun never actually met, as they were playing in different leagues. (They did face each other in a minor league game in 1929, but didn't exchange words.) Finally, nearly six decades later, in 1986, Sports Illustrated arranged a conference call between the two.

Cooney also had a hand in two more triple plays in his big-league career: first, he was credited with an (assisted) triple play (with Jim Bottomley and Rogers Hornsby) on July 30, 1924. Second, Cooney was called out when Glenn Wright pulled off an unassisted triple play on May 7, 1925. Oddly, it involved the same two men as the previous year's play: Cooney was on second while Hornsby was on first and Bottomley was batting.

== See also ==
- List of second generation MLB players
- Unassisted triple play

== Sources ==
- Career statistics from Baseball Reference · Fangraphs · Baseball Reference (Minors) · Retrosheet · Baseball Almanac
- The Deadball Era
