= Johnny Cooney =

American baseball player and manager (1901-1986)

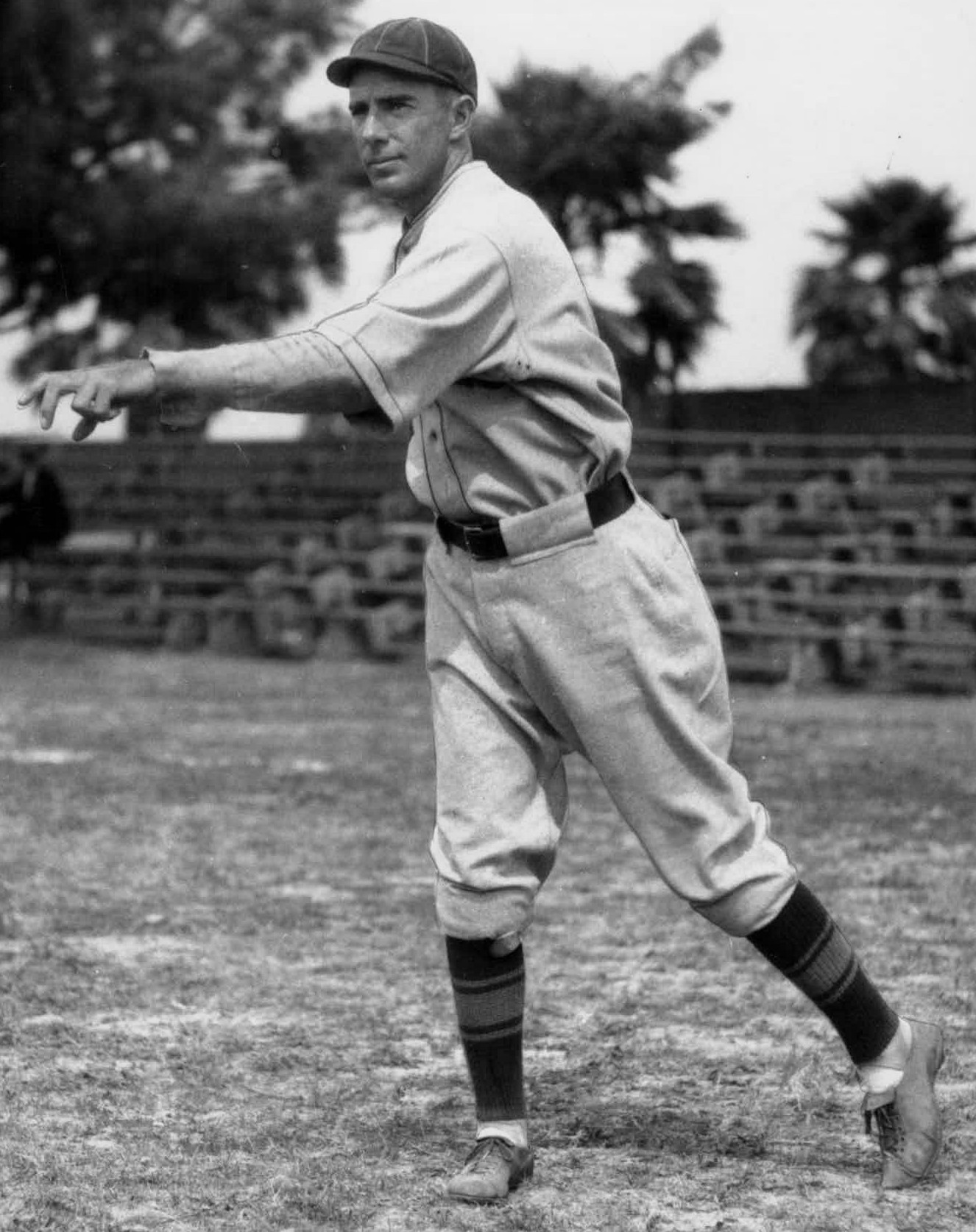
- Outfielder / Pitcher
- Born: March 18, 1901; Cranston, Rhode Island, U.S.
- Died: July 8, 1986 (aged 85); Sarasota, Florida, U.S.
- Batted: Right Threw: Left

MLB debut
- April 19, 1921, for the Boston Braves

Last MLB appearance
- July 30, 1944, for the New York Yankees

MLB statistics
- Batting average: .286
- Home runs: 2
- Runs batted in: 219
- Win–loss record: 34–44
- Earned run average: 3.72
- Strikeouts: 224
- Stats at Baseball Reference
- Managerial record at Baseball Reference

Teams
- As player: Boston Braves (1921–1930); Brooklyn Dodgers (1935–1937); Boston Bees/Braves (1938–1942); Brooklyn Dodgers (1943–1944); New York Yankees (1944); As manager: Boston Braves (1949)

John Walter Cooney (March 18, 1901 – July 8, 1986) was an American professional baseball player. He was a pitcher, outfielder and first baseman, then a longtime coach, in Major League Baseball. Listed at 5 ft 10 in (1.78 m) (178 cm) and 165 pounds (75 kg), Cooney batted right-handed but threw left-handed. He was born in Cranston, Rhode Island.

== Playing career ==
In a 20-season career, Cooney played for the Boston Bees/Braves (Braves, 1921–30, 1940–42; Bees, 1938–40) and also with the Brooklyn Dodgers (1935–37, 1943–44) and New York Yankees (1944), while hitting a .286 batting average (965-for-3372) with 219 RBI and only two home runs. He made 159 appearances as a pitcher from 1921 through 1930, all with Boston, winning 34 and losing 44 for a .436 winning percentage with 224 strikeouts and a 3.72 ERA in 795 1/3 Innings pitched.

According to Hank Greenberg's biographer, before Greenberg's very first spring training exhibition game in 1930 when his Detroit Tigers were set to play the Braves, Cooney felt sympathy towards the 19-year-old then known as Henry, took him aside before the game and promised, "Kid, I'm going to give you one you can hit." He did, and Greenberg did, as the future Hall of Fame slugger launched an impressive homer over the fence.

In his second stint in the Majors, after 1935, Cooney concentrated on playing outfield and first base. His two homers were hit in consecutive games in September 1939, when he again played for Boston and was already 38 years old. His best averages as a regular came with the Bees, .318 in 1940 and .319 in 1941. He was listed as a playing coach for Boston's National Leaguers from 1940 to 1942.

== Coaching and managerial career ==
Cooney spent the last two decades of his baseball career as a full-time coach for the Braves in both Boston and Milwaukee (1946–55) and the Chicago White Sox (1957–64), retiring after the 1964 season. He managed Boston over the last 46 games of the 1949 season when manager Billy Southworth took a leave of absence for health reasons. During his managing tenure, Cooney posted a 20–25 record with one tie (.444).

== Personal ==
Cooney's father Jimmy and older brother Jimmy Jr. also were infielders in the Major Leagues.

Cooney died in Sarasota, Florida at age 85.

== See also ==
- List of second-generation Major League Baseball players
