= 1890 Brooklyn Bridegrooms season =

1890 Brooklyn Bridegrooms
- National League champions
- League: National League
- Ballpark: Washington Park
- City: Brooklyn, New York
- Record: 86–43 (.667)
- League place: 1st
- Owners: Charles Byrne, Ferdinand Abell
- President: Charles Byrne
- Manager: Bill McGunnigle
- Captain: Darby O'Brien

The 1890 Brooklyn Bridegrooms left the American Association and joined the National League. They won the league championship, becoming one of a select few teams to win championships in different leagues in back-to-back seasons.

== Regular season ==
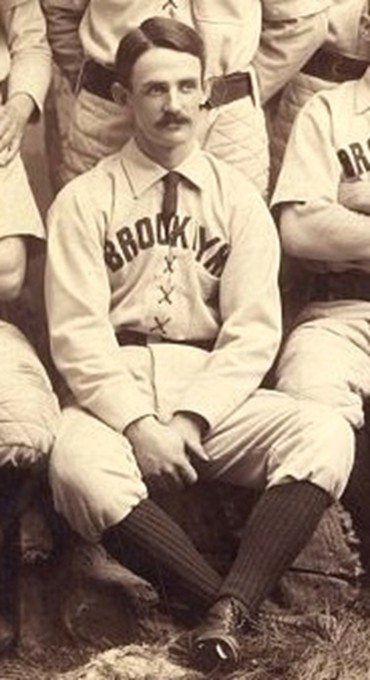
Pitcher Bob Caruthers

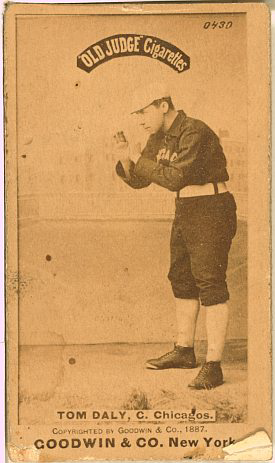
Catcher Tom Daly

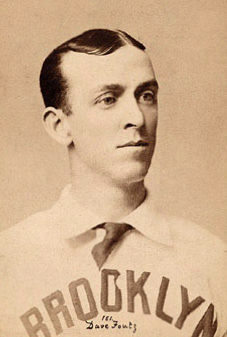
First baseman Dave Foutz

Pitcher Tom Lovett

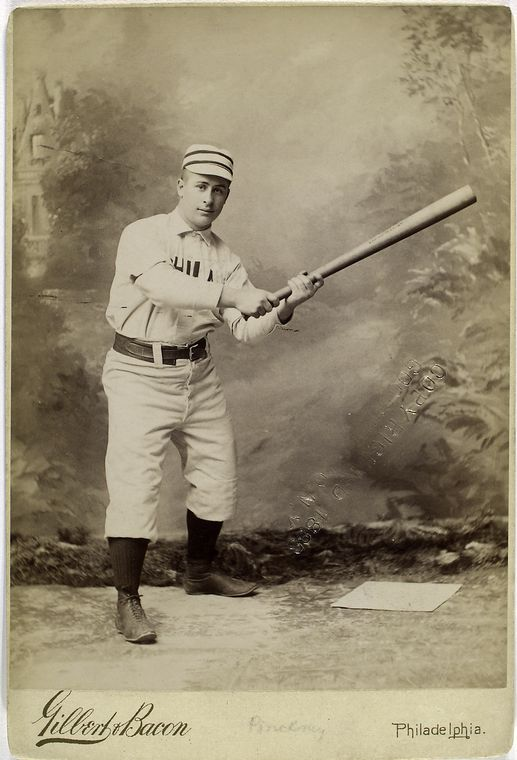
Third baseman George Pinkney

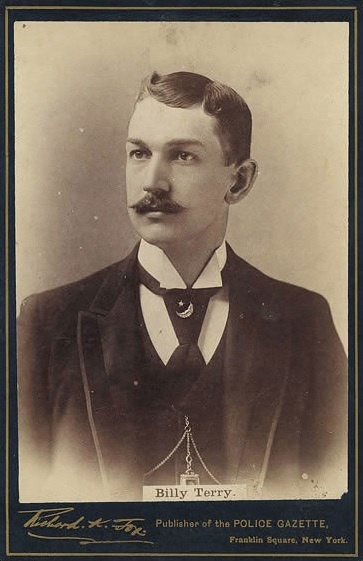
Pitcher Adonis Terry

=== Season standings ===
National League
Team	W	L	Pct.	GB	Home	Road
Brooklyn Bridegrooms	86	43	.667	—	58‍–‍16	28‍–‍27
Chicago Colts	83	53	.610	6½	48‍–‍24	35‍–‍29
Philadelphia Phillies	78	53	.595	9	54‍–‍21	24‍–‍32
Cincinnati Reds	77	55	.583	10½	50‍–‍23	27‍–‍32
Boston Beaneaters	76	57	.571	12	43‍–‍23	33‍–‍34
New York Giants	63	68	.481	24	37‍–‍27	26‍–‍41
Cleveland Spiders	44	88	.333	43½	30‍–‍37	14‍–‍51
Pittsburgh Alleghenys	23	113	.169	66½	14‍–‍25	9‍–‍88

=== Record vs. opponents ===
1890 National League record Sources:
Team	BSN	BRO	CHI	CIN	CLE	NYG	PHI	PIT
Boston	—	6–11	8–11	11–8	13–7	11–8–1	11–9	16–3
Brooklyn	11–6	—	11–9	9–7	17–3	10–8	10–8	18–2
Chicago	11–8	9–11	—	12–8–2	13–7	13–6	8–10–1	17–3
Cincinnati	8–11	7–9	8–12–2	—	13–4	14–6	11–9	16–4
Cleveland	7–13	3–17	7–13	4–13	—	6–12–2	5–14–1	12–6–1
New York	8–11–1	8–10	6–13	6–14	12–6–2	—	6–11	17–3–1
Philadelphia	9–11	8–10	10–8–1	9–11	14–5–1	11–6	—	17–2
Pittsburgh	3–16	2–18	3–17	4–16	6–12–1	3–17–1	2–17	—

=== Roster ===
1890 Brooklyn Bridegrooms
Roster
Pitchers: Lady Baldwin; Mickey Hughes; Tom Lovett	Catchers: Doc Bushong; Bob Clark; Tom Daly; George Stallings; Infielders: Hub Collins; Dave Foutz; George Pinkney; Germany Smith	Outfielders: Oyster Burns; Bob Caruthers; Pop Corkhill; Patsy Donovan; Darby O'Brien; Adonis Terry	Manager: Bill McGunnigle

== Player stats ==
=== Batting ===
==== Starters by position ====
Note: Pos = Position; G = Games played; AB = At bats; R = Runs scored; H = Hits; Avg. = Batting average; HR = Home runs; RBI = Runs batted in; SB = Stolen bases

Pos	Player	G	AB	R	H	Avg.	HR	RBI	SB
C	Tom Daly	82	292	55	71	.243	5	43	20
1B	Dave Foutz	129	509	106	154	.303	5	98	42
2B	Hub Collins	129	510	148	142	.278	3	69	85
SS	Germany Smith	129	481	76	92	.191	1	47	24
3B	George Pinkney	126	485	115	150	.309	7	83	47
OF	Oyster Burns	119	472	102	134	.284	13	128	21
OF	Darby O'Brien	85	350	78	110	.314	2	63	38
OF	Adonis Terry	99	363	63	101	.278	4	59	32

==== Other batters ====
Note: G = Games played; AB = At bats; R = Runs scored; H = Hits; Avg. = Batting average; HR = Home runs; RBI = Runs batted in; SB = Stolen bases

Player	G	AB	R	H	Avg.	HR	RBI	SB
Bob Caruthers	71	238	46	63	.265	1	29	13
Pop Corkhill	51	204	23	46	.225	1	21	6
Bob Clark	43	151	24	33	.219	0	15	10
Patsy Donovan	28	105	17	23	.219	0	8	3
Doc Bushong	16	55	5	13	.236	0	7	2
George Stallings	4	11	1	0	.000	0	0	0

=== Pitching ===
==== Starting pitchers ====
Note: G = Games pitched; GS = Games started; CG = Complete games; IP = Innings pitched; W = Wins; L = Losses; ERA = Earned run average; BB = Bases on balls; SO = Strikeouts

Player	G	GS	CG	IP	W	L	ERA	BB	SO
Tom Lovett	44	41	39	372.0	30	11	2.78	141	124
Adonis Terry	46	44	38	370.0	26	16	2.94	133	185
Bob Caruthers	37	33	30	300.0	23	11	3.09	87	64
Mickey Hughes	9	8	6	66.1	4	4	5.16	30	22

==== Other pitchers ====
Note: G = Games pitched; GS = Games started; CG = Complete games; IP = Innings pitched; W = Wins; L = Losses; ERA = Earned run average; BB = Bases on balls; SO = Strikeouts

Player	G	GS	CG	IP	W	L	ERA	BB	SO
Dave Foutz	5	2	2	29.0	2	1	1.86	6	4
Lady Baldwin	2	1	0	7.2	1	0	7.04	4	4

== 1890 World Series ==
In the 1890 World Series, the Bridegrooms faced the American Association Champions, the Louisville Colonels. The Series ended in a 3–3–1 tie.
