= John Coleman (baseball, born 1860) =

American baseball player (1860–1915)

- Pitcher
- Born: January 29, 1860; Germantown, Philadelphia, Pennsylvania
- Died: January 27, 1915 (aged 54); Bristol, Pennsylvania, U.S.
- Batted: Unknown Threw: Right

MLB debut
- June 23, 1890, for the Philadelphia Phillies

Last MLB appearance
- June 23, 1890, for the Philadelphia Phillies

MLB statistics
- Win–loss record: 0–1
- Earned run average: 21.60
- Strikeouts: 2
- Stats at Baseball Reference

Teams
- Philadelphia Phillies (1890)

John W. Coleman (January 29, 1860 – January 27, 1915) was an American professional baseball player. He played in Major League Baseball (MLB) as a right-handed pitcher. He played briefly for the Philadelphia Phillies during the 1890 season.

== Early life ==
John W. Coleman was born on January 29, 1860, in Germantown, Philadelphia, Pennsylvania, to Katharine and William Coleman. At a young age, he moved to Bristol, Pennsylvania.

== Career ==
In 1887, Coleman was a pitcher on a baseball team in Bristol along with Doc Potts. According to his obituary, he struck out 22 men in one game. His career, statistically speaking, was only slightly different from that of Moonlight Graham. Coleman debuted on June 23, 1890, and was charged with eight runs (including four earned) on four hits with three walks and two strikeouts in 1 2/3 innings. He took the loss (21.60 earned run average) and never appeared in another major league game.

Coleman had a restaurant business on Mill Street. He then took charge of the Coleman House.

== Personal life ==
Coleman married Elizabeth. They had one daughter, Helen.

Coleman had cirrhosis of the liver starting around 1905. He died on January 27, 1915, at his home in Bristol. He was buried in St. Mark's Cemetery.
