= Peter O'Brien =

Peter O'Brien may refer to:

== Sportsmen ==
- Peter O'Brien (outfielder) (born 1990), MLB outfielder, 2015–present
- Pete O'Brien (1900s second baseman) (1877–1917), MLB second baseman, 1901–1907
- Pete O'Brien (1890s second baseman) (1867–1937), MLB second baseman, 1887–1890
- Pete O'Brien (first baseman) (born 1958), MLB first baseman, 1982–1993
- Peter O'Brien (Gaelic footballer), Gaelic football goalkeeper
- Peter O'Brien (rugby league) (1928–2016), Australian rugby league footballer
- Peter O'Brien (hurler) (born 1987), Irish hurler

== Others ==
- Peter O'Brien, 1st Baron O'Brien (1842–1914), also known as Sir Peter O'Brien, Irish lawyer and judge
- Peter O'Brien (actor) (born 1960), Australian actor
- Peter O'Brien (theologian) (born 1935), Australian New Testament scholar
- Peter O'Brien (Medal of Honor) (1842–1898), American Civil War soldier and Medal of Honor recipient
- James O'Brien (New Zealand politician) (Peter James O'Brien, 1874–1947)

== See also ==
- Peter O'Brian (disambiguation)
