= Peter O'Brian =

Peter O'Brian may refer to:

- Peter O'Brian (actor), New Zealand/Indonesian actor
- Peter O'Brian (film producer) (born 1947), Canadian film producer

== See also ==
- Peter O'Brien (disambiguation)
