= Fred Demarais =

American baseball player (1866–1919)

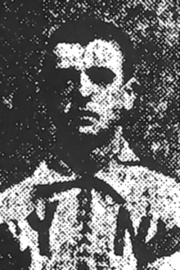
- Pitcher
- Born: November 1, 1866; Montreal, Quebec, Canada
- Died: March 6, 1919 (aged 52); Stamford, Connecticut, U.S.
- Batted: Unknown Threw: Right

MLB debut
- July 26, 1890, for the Chicago Colts

Last MLB appearance
- July 26, 1890, for the Chicago Colts

MLB statistics
- Win–loss record: 0-0
- Earned run average: 0.00
- Strikeouts: 1
- Stats at Baseball Reference

Teams
- Chicago Colts (1890)

Frederick Demarais (November 1, 1866 – March 6, 1919) was a Canadian born pitcher in Major League Baseball with the Chicago Colts of the National League. He pitched two scoreless innings for the Colts on July 26, 1890, in his only major league appearance. His minor league career lasted through 1894.
