= Artie Clarke =

American baseball player (1865–1949)

- Catcher/Outfielder/Infielder
- Born: May 6, 1865; Providence, Rhode Island, U.S.
- Died: November 14, 1949 (aged 84); Brookline, Massachusetts, U.S.
- Batted: Right Threw: Right

MLB debut
- April 19, 1890, for the New York Giants

Last MLB appearance
- September 30, 1891, for the New York Giants

MLB statistics
- Batting average: .214
- Home runs: 0
- Runs batted in: 70
- Stats at Baseball Reference

Teams
- New York Giants (1890–1891)

Arthur Franklin Clarke (May 6, 1865 – November 14, 1949) was an American Major League Baseball player. He played for the New York Giants of the National League in 1890–1891. He played college ball at Brown University and Williams College.

== Sources ==
- Career statistics from Baseball Reference · Baseball Reference (Minors) · Retrosheet · Baseball Almanac
