= Jimmy Cooney (1890s shortstop) =

American baseball player (1865–1903)

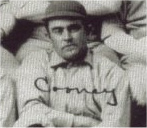
- Shortstop
- Born: July 9, 1865; Cranston, Rhode Island, U.S.
- Died: July 1, 1903 (aged 37); Cranston, Rhode Island, U.S.
- Batted: Both Threw: Right

MLB debut
- April 19, 1890, for the Chicago Colts

Last MLB appearance
- July 29, 1892, for the Washington Senators

MLB statistics
- Batting average: .242
- Home runs: 4
- Runs batted in: 118
- Stats at Baseball Reference

Teams
- Chicago Colts (1890–1892); Washington Senators (1892)

James Joseph Cooney (July 9, 1865 – July 1, 1903) was an American shortstop in Major League Baseball who played from 1890 through 1892 for the Chicago Colts (1890–92) and Washington Senators (1892) of the National League. Listed at 5' 9", 155 lb. Cooney batted switch and threw right-handed. He was born in Cranston, Rhode Island.

In a three-season career, Cooney was a .242 hitter (315-for-1302) with four home runs and 118 RBI in 324 games, including 35 doubles, 14 triples, and 77 stolen bases.

Cooney's sons Jimmy and Johnny also played in the Major Leagues. Cooney died at the age of 37 in his hometown of Cranston of pneumonia, and is interred at the St. Ann Cemetery there.

== See also ==
- List of second-generation Major League Baseball players
