= Will Smalley =

American baseball player (1871–1891)

- Third baseman
- Born: June 27, 1871; Oakland, California, U.S.
- Died: October 11, 1891 (aged 20); Bay City, Michigan, U.S.
- Batted: Right Threw: Right

MLB debut
- April 19, 1890, for the Cleveland Spiders

Last MLB appearance
- April 30, 1891, for the Washington Statesmen

MLB statistics
- Batting average: .209
- Hits: 113
- Runs batted in: 45
- Stats at Baseball Reference

Teams
- Cleveland Spiders (1890); Washington Statesmen (1891)

William Darwin Smalley (June 27, 1871 – October 11, 1891), nicknamed "Deacon", was an American Major League Baseball player for the Cleveland Spiders of the National League in 1890 and the Washington Statesmen of the American Association in 1891.

== Baseball career ==
Born in Oakland, California on June 27, 1871, Smalley was just 17 when he joined his hometown team, the California League's Oakland Greenhood and Morans in 1888. Smalley switched to the San Francisco Haverleys later that season and then to the Oakland Colonels in 1889 when a scout for the Cleveland Spiders spotted him, inviting Smalley and several of his teammates to make the trek east to Cleveland.

Still only eighteen when he made his big-league debut, Smalley proved to be a slick-fielding but weak-hitting third baseman, batting just .213 on the season. Still, Smalley played all 136 of the team's games, as did outfielder (and future Hall-of-Famer) George Davis. (Smalley's 502 at-bats in 1890 is still ninth-highest all-time for a teenaged MLB player.) Cleveland let Smalley go after the season.

In 1891, Smalley hooked on with Washington of the American Association. Playing nine games at third base and two at second, Smalley was still overmatched by big league pitching (6-for-38, .158) and was released in early May; he finished the season by playing eleven games for the minor-league Syracuse Stars.

== Death ==
Will Smalley would never get another chance to prove himself on the ballfield. In late September, while living in Syracuse, Smalley took ill with stomach cancer; his uncle William brought Will to the older man's home in Bay City, Michigan. The young ballplayer declined rapidly and died on October 11, 1891, at the age of 20; his remains were buried in Oakland.

Before the death of Jay Dahl three-quarters of a century later, Smalley was the youngest at death of any player in Major League history.
