= Tom Dowse =

Irish baseball player (1866–1946)

- Catcher
- Born: August 12, 1866; Mohill, Ireland
- Died: December 14, 1946 (aged 80); Riverside, California, U.S.
- Batted: Right Threw: Right

MLB debut
- April 21, 1890, for the Cleveland Spiders

Last MLB appearance
- October 12, 1892, for the Washington Senators

MLB statistics
- Batting average: .197
- Home runs: 0
- Runs batted in: 46
- Stats at Baseball Reference

Teams
- Cleveland Spiders (1890); Columbus Solons (1891); Louisville Colonels (1892); Cincinnati Reds (1892); Philadelphia Phillies (1892); Washington Senators (1892)

Thomas Joseph Dowse (August 12, 1866 – December 14, 1946) was an Irish born catcher and outfielder who played in Major League Baseball from 1890 through 1892. Listed at 5' 11", 175 lb, Dowse batted and threw right-handed. He was born in Mohill, Ireland.

In a three-season career, Dowse was a .197 hitter (116-for-590) with 46 RBI without home runs in 160 games played. Despite his modest numbers, he entered the record books by playing for four different teams in a single season, matching a very uncommon feat set by Harry Wheeler in 1884.

Basically a catcher, Dowse also played every position but third baseman and shortstop during his major-league tenure. He started his career in 1890 with the Cleveland Spiders of the National League, appearing in 40 games for them while hitting a .208 average. That season, he also served as an emergency umpire in three games. In 1891 he played for the Columbus Solons of the American Association and posted career-numbers in average (.224), RBI (22), runs (24), and doubles (7). Dowse returned to the National League in 1892 with the Louisville Colonels, appearing in 41 games for them before moving to the Cincinnati Reds (one), Philadelphia Phillies (16) and Washington Senators (7), hitting .165 in a career-high 65 games. He never appeared in a major league game again.

Dowse died in Riverside, California, at the age of 80.

== See also ==
- List of players from Ireland in Major League Baseball
