= Tom Nagle =

American baseball player (1865–1946)

- Catcher
- Born: October 30, 1865; Milwaukee, Wisconsin, U.S.
- Died: March 9, 1946 (aged 80); Milwaukee, Wisconsin, U.S.
- Batted: Right Threw: Right

MLB debut
- April 22, 1890, for the Chicago Colts

Last MLB appearance
- May 27, 1891, for the Chicago Colts

MLB statistics
- Batting average: .249
- Home runs: 1
- Runs batted in: 12
- Stats at Baseball Reference

Teams
- Chicago Colts (1890–1891)

Thomas Edward Nagle (October 30, 1865 – March 9, 1946) was an American Major League Baseball player who played catcher for the Chicago Colts of the National League. He appeared in 46 games for the Colts from 1890 to 1891. He played in the minor leagues on and off between 1886 and 1895.
