= Bill Delaney (baseball) =

American baseball player (1863–1942)

- Second baseman
- Born: March 5, 1863; Cincinnati, Ohio, U.S.
- Died: March 1, 1942 (aged 78); Canton, Ohio, U.S.
- Batted: Right Threw: Right

MLB debut
- August 21, 1890, for the Cleveland Spiders

Last MLB appearance
- October 4, 1890, for the Cleveland Spiders

MLB statistics
- Batting average: .190
- Hits: 22
- Runs batted in: 7
- Stats at Baseball Reference

Teams
- Cleveland Spiders (1890)

William L. Delaney (March 5, 1863 – March 1, 1942) was an American second baseman in Major League Baseball. He played for the Cleveland Spiders of the National League in 1890.

== Sources ==
- Career statistics from Baseball Reference · Retrosheet · Baseball Almanac
