= Al Schellhase =

American baseball player (1864–1919)

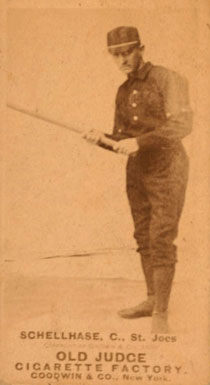
- Catcher / Outfielder
- Born: September 13, 1864; Evansville, Indiana, U.S.
- Died: January 3, 1919 (aged 54); Evansville, Indiana, U.S.
- Batted: Right Threw: Right

MLB debut
- May 7, 1890, for the Boston Beaneaters

Last MLB appearance
- October 4, 1891, for the Louisville Colonels

MLB statistics
- Batting average: .133
- Home runs: 0
- Runs batted in: 1
- Stats at Baseball Reference

Teams
- Boston Beaneaters (1890); Louisville Colonels (1891)

Albert Herman Schellhase (September 13, 1864 – January 3, 1919) was an American Major League Baseball player. He was primarily an outfielder with the Boston Beaneaters of the National League in 1890 and played catcher for the 1891 Louisville Colonels of the American Association.
