= Pat Luby =

American baseball player (1869–1899)

- Pitcher
- Born: January 1869; Charleston, South Carolina, U.S.
- Died: April 24, 1899 (aged 30); Charleston, South Carolina, U.S.
- Batted: Left Threw: Right

MLB debut
- June 16, 1890, for the Chicago Colts

Last MLB appearance
- June 11, 1895, for the Louisville Colonels

MLB statistics
- Win–loss record: 40–41
- Earned run average: 3.88
- Strikeouts: 215
- Stats at Baseball Reference

Teams
- Chicago Colts (1890–1892); Louisville Colonels (1895)

John Perkins "Pat" Luby (January, 1869 – April 24, 1899) was an American professional baseball pitcher in the Major Leagues from 1890 to 1895. Luby played for the Louisville Colonels and Chicago Colts.

Luby won 20 games for the Chicago Colts as a rookie in 1890. He died of tuberculosis in 1899 at age 30.

== See also ==
- List of baseball players who died during their careers
