= Ed Hutchinson =

American baseball player (1867–1934)

- Second baseman
- Born: May 19, 1867; Pittsburgh, Pennsylvania, U.S.
- Died: July 19, 1934 (aged 67); Colfax, California, U.S.
- Batted: Left Threw: Right

MLB debut
- June 17, 1890, for the Chicago Colts

Last MLB appearance
- October 2, 1890, for the Chicago Colts

MLB statistics
- Batting average: .059
- Home runs: 0
- Runs batted in: 0
- Stats at Baseball Reference

Teams
- Chicago Colts (1890)

Edwin Forrest Hutchinson (May 19, 1867 – July 19, 1934) was an American Major League Baseball player who played second base for the Chicago Colts of the National League. He appeared in four games for the Colts in the 1890 season. He remained active in the minor leagues, mostly in western leagues, through 1906, and was briefly a player/manager for the Spokane Indians in 1906.

At the time of his death he lived in Colfax, California.
