= Joe Knight (baseball) =

Canadian baseball player (1859–1938)

- Left fielder
- Born: September 28, 1859; Port Stanley, Ontario, Canada
- Died: October 16, 1938 (aged 79); Lynhurst, Ontario, Canada
- Batted: Left Threw: Left

MLB debut
- May 16, 1884, for the Philadelphia Quakers

Last MLB appearance
- October 3, 1890, for the Cincinnati Reds

MLB statistics
- Batting average: .309
- Home runs: 4
- Runs batted in: 69
- Stats at Baseball Reference

Teams
- Philadelphia Quakers (1884); Cincinnati Reds (1890)

Jonah William "Quiet Joe" Knight (September 28, 1859 – October 16, 1938) was a Canadian professional baseball player. He played two seasons in Major League Baseball for the Philadelphia Quakers (1884) and Cincinnati Reds (1890), primarily as a left fielder.

A native of Port Stanley, Ontario, Knight came up to the big leagues as a pitcher in 1884. In six starts for the Quakers he won 2, lost 4, and had an earned run average of 5.47 in 51 innings. He struck out 8 and walked 21.

Six years later he returned to the major leagues, this time as an outfielder. As the everyday left fielder for the 77–55 Reds, he finished sixth in the National League with a .312 batting average, hit 4 home runs, and drove in 67 runs. He also ranked sixth in the league with 26 doubles. His final major league appearance was October 3, 1890 at the age of 31.

His two-season career statistics include 133 games played, a .309 batting average (156-for-505), 4 home runs, 69 RBI, 69 runs scored, an on-base percentage of .362 and a slugging percentage of .422.

Knight died at the age of 79 in Lynhurst, Ontario, Canada.
