= Pat Lyons =

Canadian baseball player (1860–1914)

- Second baseman
- Born: March 1860; Belleville, Ontario, Canada
- Died: January 20, 1914 (aged 53); Springfield, Ohio, U.S.
- Batted: Right Threw: Right

MLB debut
- July 21, 1890, for the Cleveland Spiders

Last MLB appearance
- August 5, 1890, for the Cleveland Spiders

MLB statistics
- Batting average: .053
- Hits: 2
- Home runs: 0
- Stats at Baseball Reference

Teams
- Cleveland Spiders (1890)

Patrick Jerry Lyons (March 1860 – January 20, 1914) was a Canadian Major League Baseball player. Lyons played for the Cleveland Spiders in the 1890 season as a second baseman.

Lyons was born in Belleville, Ontario and died in Springfield, Ohio.

== Professional career ==
Before playing at the major league level, Lyons played for Springfield of the Tri-State League, Hamilton and the Dayton Reds in 1889. He played for Dayton again in 1890 before being purchased by the Spiders.

Lyons played in 11 games in his one-year career. He had a .053 batting average, with two hits in 38 at bats. He batted and threw right-handed.

He played for Meadville of the New York–Penn League in 1891, Quincy Ravens of the Illinois–Indiana League in the 1892, the Johnstown Terrors of the Pennsylvania State League in 1893, the Staunton Hayseeds/Newport News-Hampton Deckhands of the Virginia League in 1894, the Petersburg Farmers of the Virginia State League in 1895.
