= Vince Dailey =

American baseball player (1864–1919)

- Outfielder
- Born: December 25, 1864; Osceola Township, Pennsylvania, U.S.
- Died: November 14, 1919 (aged 54); Hornell, New York, U.S.
- Batted: Unknown Threw: Unknown

MLB debut
- April 21, 1890, for the Cleveland Spiders

Last MLB appearance
- July 19, 1890, for the Cleveland Spiders

MLB statistics
- Batting average: .289
- Hits: 71
- Runs batted in: 32
- Stats at Baseball Reference

Teams
- Cleveland Spiders (1890)

Vincent Perry Dailey (December 25, 1864 – November 14, 1919) was an American professional baseball player. An outfielder in Major League Baseball, he played for the Cleveland Spiders of the National League in 1890. He was born in Osceola, Pennsylvania and died aged 54 in Hornell, New York.

== Sources ==
- Career statistics from Baseball Reference · Baseball Reference (Minors) · Retrosheet · Baseball Almanac
