= George McMillan (baseball) =

Canadian baseball player (1863–1920)

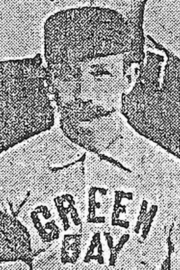
- Outfielder
- Born: September 1, 1863; Ontario, Canada
- Died: April 18, 1920 (aged 56); Cleveland, Ohio, U.S.
- Batted: Unknown Threw: Unknown

MLB debut
- August 11, 1890, for the New York Giants

Last MLB appearance
- August 22, 1890, for the New York Giants

MLB statistics
- Batting average: .143
- Home runs: 0
- Runs batted in: 1
- Stats at Baseball Reference

Teams
- New York Giants (1890)

George A. McMillan (September 1, 1863 – April 18, 1920) was a Canadian professional baseball player. He played ten games for the New York Giants of Major League Baseball's National League during the 1890 season.

== Sources ==
- Career statistics from Baseball Reference · Baseball Reference (Minors) · Retrosheet · Baseball Almanac
