= Ossie France =

American baseball player (1858–1947)

- Pitcher
- Born: October 4, 1858; Greensburg, Ohio, U.S.
- Died: May 2, 1947 (aged 88); Akron, Ohio, U.S.
- Batted: Left Threw: Left

MLB debut
- July 14, 1890, for the Chicago Colts

Last MLB appearance
- July 14, 1890, for the Chicago Colts

MLB statistics
- Win–loss record: 0–0
- Strikeouts: 0
- Earned run average: 13.50
- Stats at Baseball Reference

Teams
- Chicago Colts (1890)

Osman Beverly France (October 4, 1858 – May 2, 1947) was an American pitcher in Major League Baseball with the Chicago Colts of the National League. He pitched two innings for the Colts on July 14, 1890 in his only Major League appearance. His minor league career lasted through 1892.
