= John Dolan (baseball) =

American baseball player (1867–1948)

- Pitcher
- Born: September 12, 1867; Newport, Kentucky, U.S.
- Died: May 8, 1948 (aged 80); Springfield, Ohio, U.S.
- Batted: Unknown Threw: Right

MLB debut
- September 5, 1890, for the Cincinnati Reds

Last MLB appearance
- September 4, 1895, for the Chicago Colts

MLB statistics
- Win–loss record: 15–16
- Strikeouts: 87
- Earned run average: 4.30
- Stats at Baseball Reference

Teams
- Cincinnati Reds (1890); Columbus Solons (1891); Washington Senators (1892); St. Louis Browns (1893); Chicago Colts (1895)

John Dolan (September 12, 1867 – May 8, 1948) was an American pitcher in Major League Baseball.

== Sources ==
- Career statistics from Baseball Reference · Baseball Reference (Minors) · Retrosheet · Baseball Almanac
