= National League Park =

Baseball grounds located in Cleveland, Ohio

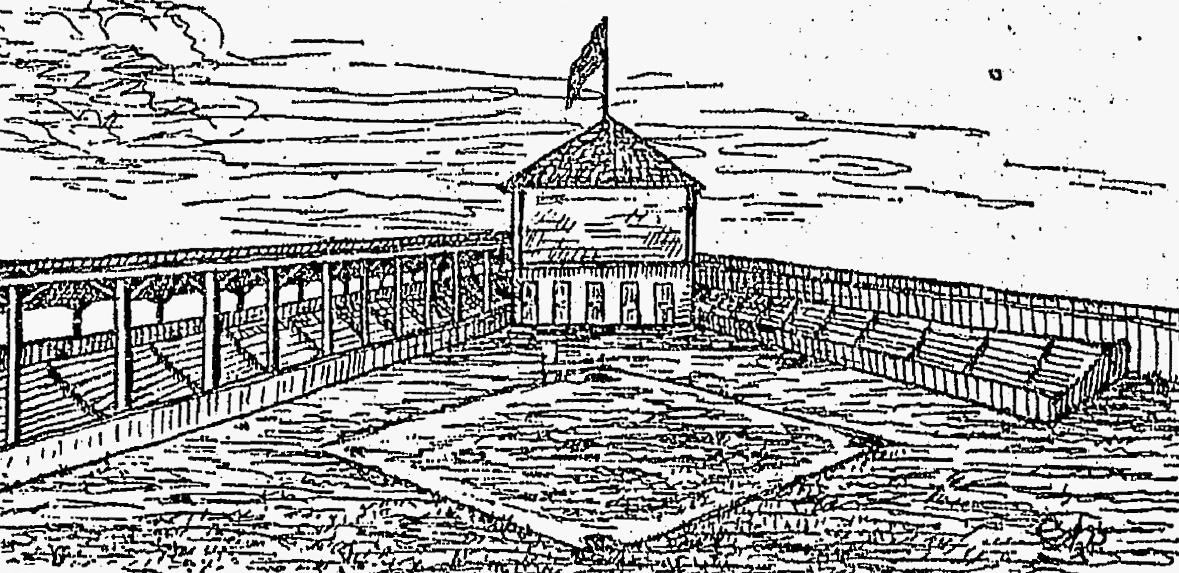

- Location within Cleveland Location within Ohio Location within the United States
- Location: Cleveland, Ohio
- Coordinates: 41°30′3″N 81°39′14″W
- Surface: Grass

Construction
- Opened: 1887

Tenants
- Cleveland Blues / Spiders (AA / NL) (1887–1890); Cleveland Blues (NL) (1879–1884)

National League Park is the name of two former baseball grounds located in Cleveland, Ohio, United States. The first ground was home to the Cleveland Blues of the National League from 1879 to 1884.

The Kennard Street Baseball Grounds (Kennard Street Park), later renamed National League Park, was bounded by Sibley Street (present Carnegie Avenue) on the north, Cedar Avenue on the south, Kennard Street (present East 46th Street) on the west, and the eastern edge ended at the boundary of the back yards of the houses facing Willson Avenue (present East 55th Street). A contemporary plat map indicates the diamond was closest to the Kennard-Cedar intersection.

The second National League Park was the home of the Cleveland Spiders of the American Association from 1887 to 1888 and of the National League from 1889 to 1890. This ground was located a few blocks northwest of the Kennard site. It was contained within a large block bounded by Payne, Euclid, Case [later 40th] and Sterling [later 30th] Avenues, with the main entrance at Payne and Douglass [later 35th] Avenues. The third base line was parallel to Payne, and the first base line parallel to Sterling. That put the main stand in the northwest corner, near Payne and Sterling. During 1887–1888 the newspapers called it "Association Park", and during 1889–1890 the papers called it "National League Park" or just "League Park".

After the 1890 season the Spiders moved to League Park.
