= Jake Virtue =

American baseball player (1865–1943)

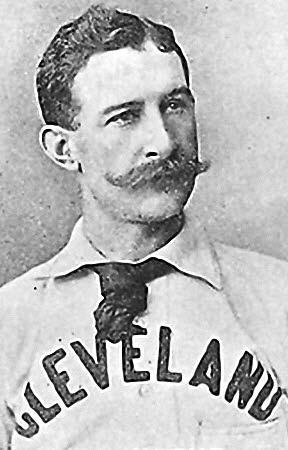
- First baseman
- Born: March 2, 1865; Philadelphia, Pennsylvania, US
- Died: February 3, 1943 (aged 77); Camden, New Jersey, US
- Batted: Switch Threw: Left

MLB debut
- July 21, 1890, for the Cleveland Spiders

Last MLB appearance
- July 20, 1894, for the Cleveland Spiders

MLB statistics
- Batting average: .274
- Home runs: 7
- Runs batted in: 256
- Stats at Baseball Reference

Teams
- Cleveland Spiders (1890–1894)

Jacob Kitchline "Guesses" Virtue (March 2, 1865 – February 3, 1943) was an American first baseman in Major League Baseball (MLB) from 1890 to 1894. He played for the Cleveland Spiders of the National League (NL). During the split-season format played in 1892, he was Cleveland's first baseman when they won the second half of the season but ultimately lost the NL pennant to Boston.

== Biography ==
Born in Philadelphia on March 2, 1865, Virtue debuted in the major leagues with Cleveland in 1890. In The Great Encyclopedia of Nineteenth Century Major League Baseball, Virtue is described as a 5'9" player with excellent defensive skills. However, he also "had a huge failing. He was so short of self-confidence (some in Cleveland were unkind enough to say courage) that an error in the first inning or a strikeout in his first at bat would ruin him for the rest of the game."

In two seasons, 1891 and 1892, Virtue played in more than 100 games. In 1891, Virtue hit 14 triples, fifth best in the NL. Defensively, Virtue led the NL in putouts (1465), but he also led NL first basemen in errors (44). In the split-season format that was trialed in 1892, the Spiders finished fifth in the first half of the season, but they earned first place in the second half. They lost a best-of-nine playoff for the NL pennant, falling to Boston in six games. Virtue hit 20 triples that year, second best in the NL, and he registered 1500 putouts and 26 errors.

In early 1893, The New York Times reported that Virtue might play in Philadelphia that year to replace first baseman Roger Connor; Connor was to be traded to the New York Giants. Connor was sent to New York, but Virtue remained in Cleveland. Though the pitching distance was increased from 55 feet and 6 inches to 60 feet and 6 inches for 1893, Virtue struggled offensively and defensively. A late-season on-field collision in 1892 seemed to have rendered Virtue "gunshy".

He played only 97 games in the 1893 season; player-manager Patsy Tebeau split time with Chippy McGarr at third base and Virtue at first base. The left-hander did appear in games at several positions: first base, outfield, third base, shortstop and even pitcher for five innings of a single game. He played in 29 games in 1894, again split between multiple positions. McGarr played well at third base that year, freeing Tebeau to take over first base full-time from Virtue.

Virtue attempted a comeback with the Louisville Colonels in 1895, but a stroke before spring training forced him to retire. He died in Camden, New Jersey, on February 3, 1943. He is buried in Mount Vernon Cemetery in Philadelphia.
