= Mort Scanlan =

American baseball player (1861–1928)

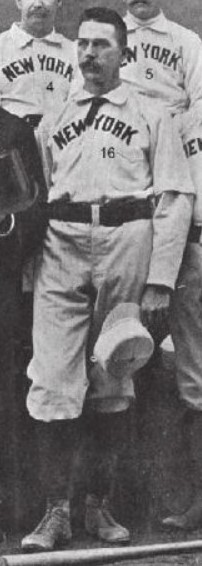
- Scanlan in 1890
- First baseman
- Born: March 18, 1861; Chicago, Illinois, U.S.
- Died: December 29, 1928 (aged 67); Chicago, Illinois, U.S.
- Batted: Unknown Threw: Unknown

MLB debut
- April 21, 1890, for the New York Giants

Last MLB appearance
- April 23, 1890, for the New York Giants

MLB statistics
- Games played: 3
- At bats: 10
- Hits: 0
- Stats at Baseball Reference

Teams
- New York Giants (1890)

Mortimer J. Scanlan (March 18, 1861 – December 29, 1928) was an American first baseman in Major League Baseball. He appeared in three games for the New York Giants of the National League on April 21, 22, and 23, 1890.
