= Tony Von Fricken =

American baseball player (1869–1947)

- Pitcher
- Born: May 30, 1869; Brooklyn, New York
- Died: March 22, 1947 (aged 77); Troy, New York
- Batted: Switch Threw: Right

MLB debut
- May 9, 1890, for the Boston Beaneaters

Last MLB appearance
- May 9, 1890, for the Boston Beaneaters

MLB statistics
- Win–loss record: 0-1
- Earned run average: 10.13
- Strikeouts: 2

Teams
- Boston Beaneaters (1890)

Anthony John Von Fricken (May 30, 1869 – March 22, 1947) was a pitcher in Major League Baseball who played in one game with the Boston Beaneaters on May 9, 1890. He pitched the complete game and got the loss, while allowing 16 runs, 9 of which were earned. He struck out 2 and walked 8.
