= Marty Honan =

American baseball player (1869–1908)

- Catcher
- Born: May 29, 1869; Chicago, Illinois, U.S.
- Died: August 20, 1908 (aged 39); Chicago, Illinois, U.S.
- Batted: Unknown Threw: Unknown

MLB debut
- October 3, 1890, for the Chicago Colts

Last MLB appearance
- June 15, 1891, for the Chicago Colts

MLB statistics
- Batting average: .133
- Home runs: 0
- Runs batted in: 4
- Stats at Baseball Reference

Teams
- Chicago Colts (1890–1891)

Martin Weldon Honan (May 29, 1869 – August 20, 1908) was an American Major League Baseball player who played catcher for the Chicago Colts of the National League. He appeared in six games for the Colts from 1890 to 1891.
