= Tom Vickery =

American baseball player (1867–1921)

- Pitcher
- Born: May 5, 1867; Milford, Massachusetts, U.S.
- Died: March 21, 1921 (aged 53); Burlington, New Jersey, U.S.
- Batted: Unknown Threw: Right

MLB debut
- April 21, 1890, for the Philadelphia Phillies

Last MLB appearance
- July 29, 1893, for the Philadelphia Phillies

MLB statistics
- Win–loss record: 42-41
- Earned run average: 3.75
- Strikeouts: 265
- Stats at Baseball Reference

Teams
- Philadelphia Phillies (1890); Chicago Colts (1891); Baltimore Orioles (1892); Philadelphia Phillies (1893)

Thomas Gilbert Vickery (May 5, 1867 – March 21, 1921), nicknamed "Vinegar Tom", was an American professional baseball player who played pitcher in the Major Leagues in 1890-1893. He would play for the Baltimore Orioles, Philadelphia Phillies, and Chicago Colts.
