= Lew Whistler =

American baseball player (1868–1959)

- First baseman
- Born: March 10, 1868; St. Louis, Missouri, U.S.
- Died: December 30, 1959 (aged 91); St. Louis, Missouri, U.S.
- Batted: Unknown Threw: Right

MLB debut
- August 7, 1890, for the New York Giants

Last MLB appearance
- June 15, 1893, for the St. Louis Browns

MLB statistics
- Batting average: .244
- Runs: 150
- Runs batted in: 133
- Stats at Baseball Reference

Teams
- New York Giants (1890–1891); Baltimore Orioles (1892); Louisville Colonels (1892–1893); St. Louis Browns (1893)

Lewis W. Whistler (né Wissler; March 10, 1868 – December 30, 1959) was an American Major League Baseball player who played the majority of his career as a first baseman. In his four-season career, he played for the New York Giants (1890–1891), Baltimore Orioles (1892), Louisville Colonels (1893) and St. Louis Browns. His major league totals include: 272 games played, 1014 at bats, and a .244 batting average. Whistler died in his hometown of St. Louis, Missouri at the age of 91, and is interred at Bethany Cemetery in Pagedale, Missouri.
