= Jim Andrews =

American baseball player (1865–1907)

- Right fielder
- Born: June 15, 1865; Shelburne Falls, Massachusetts, U.S.
- Died: December 27, 1907 (aged 42); Chicago, Illinois, U.S.

MLB debut
- April 19, 1890, for the Chicago Colts

Last MLB appearance
- July 4, 1890, for the Chicago Colts

MLB statistics
- Batting average: .188
- Home runs: 3
- Runs batted in: 17
- Stats at Baseball Reference

Teams
- Chicago Colts (1890)

James Pratt Andrews (June 5, 1865 – December 27, 1907) was an American professional baseball right fielder. He played in Major League Baseball (MLB) in 1890 for the Chicago Colts of the National League. He was a native of Shelburne Falls, Massachusetts.

In 1890, his only Major League season, Andrews was in the starting lineup for the first 2½ months (April 19 – July 4) of the 5½ month season. In 53 games he was just 38-for-202, a batting average of .188. He had 3 home runs, 17 RBI, and scored 32 runs. An average fielder for the era, he handled 90 out of 100 chances successfully for a fielding percentage of .900.

To give some perspective to his value to the team, the Colts were 29-28 during his time with them, and 54-25 after he was gone.

Andrews died at the age of 42 in Chicago of pulmonary tuberculosis, and was buried at Mount Olivet Cemetery.
