= Pete O'Brien (1890s second baseman) =

American baseball player (1867–1937)

- Second baseman
- Born: June 16, 1867; Chicago, Illinois, U.S.
- Died: June 30, 1937 (aged 70); York, Illinois, U.S.
- Batted: Right Threw: Right

MLB debut
- August 2, 1887, for the Washington Nationals

Last MLB appearance
- June 16, 1890, for the Chicago Colts

MLB statistics
- Batting average: .273
- Home runs: 3
- Runs batted in: 16
- Stats at Baseball Reference

Teams
- Washington Nationals (1887); Chicago Colts (1890)

Peter James O'Brien (June 16, 1867 – June 30, 1937) was an American Major League Baseball player. He played in one game for the Washington Nationals in 1887 and 27 games for the Chicago Colts in 1890.

== Sources ==
- Career statistics from Baseball Reference · Baseball Reference (Minors) · Retrosheet · Baseball Almanac
- Retrosheet page for Pete O'Brien
