= List of Pittsburgh Pirates owners and executives =

The Pittsburgh Pirates are a Major League Baseball (MLB) franchise based in Pittsburgh, Pennsylvania. They play in the National League Central division. The team began play in 1882 as the Alleghenies (alternately spelled "Alleghenys") in the American Association. The franchise moved to the National League after owner William Nimick became upset over a contract dispute, thus beginning the modern day franchise.

From the franchise's beginning, the owner and manager fulfilled the duties of the general manager. However, in 1946, Roy Hamey left his position as president of the second American Association to become the Pirates' first general manager. The franchise's second general manager, Branch Rickey, was elected to the Hall of Fame in 1967. Hired in September 2007, Neal Huntington is the Pirates's previous general manager. Barney Dreyfuss purchased the franchise in 1900, bringing players including Honus Wagner and Fred Clarke with him from the Louisville Colonels, which he had previously owned. In his 32 years as owner, Dreyfuss built Forbes Field and helped to organize the World Series. Dreyfuss was elected to the Hall of Fame in 2008. Bob Nutting served as chairman of the board from 2003 to 2007, at which point he became majority owner of the franchise.

== Table key ==
Years	Seasons; each is linked to an article about that particular season
Div	Division titles: number of division titles won by the general manager
Pen	Pennants: number of pennants (league championships) won by the manager
WS	World Series: number of World Series victories achieved by the manager
*	Inducted into the National Baseball Hall of Fame and Museum

== Owners ==
Owner(s)	Years	Div	Pen	WS	Ref
Denny McKnight	1882–1886	—	—	—	
William A. Nimick	1887–1891	—	—	—	
William Kerr and Phil Auten	1892–1899	—	—	—	
Barney Dreyfuss*	1900–1932	0	6	2	
Florence W. Dreyfuss	1932–1946	—	—	—	
John Galbreath (Majority Owner 1946–86), with Frank E. McKinney, Thomas P. Johnson, Bing Crosby (1%) and Warner Communications (48% 1982–86)	1946–1986	6	3	3	
Pittsburgh Associates	1986–1996	3	0	0	
Kevin McClatchy	1996–2007	—	—	—	
Bob Nutting	2007–present	—	—	—	

== General managers ==
#	General manager	Years	Div	Pen	WS
1	Denny McKnight	1882–1883	—	—	—
2	Edmund C. Converse	1884	—	—	—
3	William A. Nimick	1885–1890	—	—	—
4	J. Palmer O'Neil	1891	—	—	—
5	William Chase Temple	1892	—	—	—
6	Al Buckenberger	1893	—	—	—
7	William Kerr	1894–1897	—	—	—
8	Bill Watkins	1898	—	—	—
9	William Kerr	1899	—	—	—
10	Barney Dreyfuss*	1900–1932	0	6	2
11	William Benswanger	1932–1946	—	—	—

- Prior to 1946, the club presidents performed the current duties of general manager.
- As the deceased owner's son-in-law, Benswanger officially served as "president and chief executive" but in effect was general manager for his mother-in-law owner.

#	General manager	Years	Div	Pen	WS	Ref
12	Ray Kennedy	1946	—	—	—	
13	Roy Hamey	1946–1950	—	—	—	
14	Branch Rickey*	1951–1955	—	—	—	
15	Joe L. Brown	1956–1976, 1985	5	2	2	
16	Harding Peterson	1976–1985	1	1	1	
17	Syd Thrift	1985–1988	—	—	—	
18	Larry Doughty	1988–1992	2	0	0	
19	Ted Simmons	1992–1993	1	0	0	
20	Cam Bonifay	1993–2001	—	—	—	
21	Dave Littlefield	2001–2007	—	—	—	
22	Neal Huntington	2007–2019	—	—	—	
23	Ben Cherington	2019–present	—	—	—	

== Presidents ==
#	President	Years	Div	Pen	WS	Ref
1	Denny McKnight	1882–1883	—	—	—	
2	Edmund C. Converse	1884	—	—	—	
3	William A. Nimick	1885–1890	—	—	—	
4	J. Palmer O'Neil	1891	—	—	—	
5	William Chase Temple	1892	—	—	—	
6	Al Buckenberger	1893	—	—	—	
7	William Kerr	1894–1897	—	—	—	
8	Bill Watkins	1898	—	—	—	
9	William Kerr	1899	—	—	—	
10	Barney Dreyfuss*	1900–1932	0	6	2	
11	William Benswanger	1932–1946	—	—	—	
12	Frank E. McKinney	1946–1950	—	—	—	
13	John Galbreath	1951–1969	1	1	1	
14	Dan Galbreath	1970–1985	2	2	2	
15	Malcolm Prine	1986–1987	—	—	—	
16	Carl Barger	1989–1991	1	0	0	
17	Mark Sauer	1991–1996	2	0	0	
18	Kevin McClatchy	1996–2007	—	—	—	
19	Frank Coonelly	2007–2019	—	—	—	
20	Travis Williams	2019–present	—	—	—	

== Other executives ==
- Jim Bowden
- Murray Cook
- Brian Graham
- Bill Lajoie
- Branch Rickey, Jr.
- Roy Smith
- Pete Vuckovich
