= Roy Rike Field =

Soccer stadium in Delaware, Ohio

Coordinates: 40°17′41″N 83°04′42″W

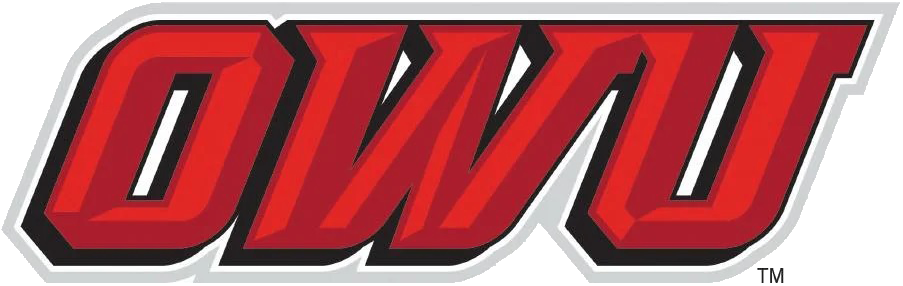

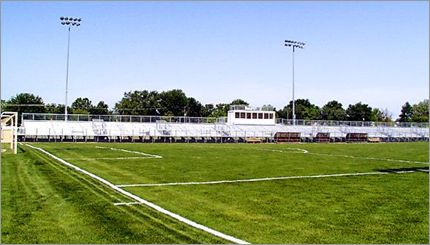
- The field in 2006
- Interactive map of Roy Rike Field
- Former names: Community Field
- Address: Park Avenue; Delaware, OH; United States
- Owner: Ohio Wesleyan University
- Operator: OWU Athletics
- Capacity: 600
- Type: Stadium

Construction
- Opened: 1934; 92 years ago

Tenants
- OWU Bishops (NCAA) teams: men's and women's soccer; men's lacrosse (1965–85); women's lacrosse (2004–07)

Website
- battlingbishops.com/royrikefield

Roy RIke Field, usually referred to simply as "Roy Rike", is the soccer field of the Jay Martin Soccer Complex at Ohio Wesleyan University in Delaware, Ohio, where the Battling Bishops men's and women's soccer teams play.

It is also the home of the Columbus Lady Shooting Stars soccer team. The seating capacity of Roy Rike Field is about 600.

== Overview ==
The stadium was built in 1934 as a project of the Works Progress Administration, under the name "Community Field". It hosted football games and track and field events of the Willis High School, the owner by those years. The venue also had adjacent baseball field and tennis courts. After Ohio Wesleyan University purchased the complex in 1962, the athletics track was removed and the stadium was remodelled to host collegiate soccer and lacrosse games.

The field was named after Jay Martin, OWU coach who is the career wins leader in college soccer. In the past, the venue served as home for the OWU men's (1965–85) and women's lacrosse (2004–07) teams.

Roy Rike Field is located just west of the residential side of Ohio Wesleyan University. Roy Rike hosted the NCAA Division III men's soccer championship in 1990 and 1998 and the NCAA Division III women's soccer championship in 2001.
