= One Night in Miami =

One Night in Miami may refer to:

- One Night in Miami (play), an English play that premiered in 2013
- One Night in Miami..., a 2020 American film adaptation of the stage play
