= Bill Scripture =

American baseball player and manager (1941–2018)

- Born: Earl Wayne Scripture; November 20, 1941; Pensacola, Florida, U.S.
- Died: November 11, 2018 (aged 76); Elizabeth City, North Carolina, U.S.
- Occupation(s): Baseball player and manager, trap shooter, gun club manager
- Spouse: Belinda Heimanson Scripture
- Children: 2

Earl Wayne Scripture (November 20, 1941 – November 11, 2018), known as Bill or Billy Scripture, was an American outfielder, third baseman, manager and instructor in professional baseball. Born in Pensacola, Florida, he was an All-America baseball standout at Wake Forest University, Scripture threw and batted right-handed, stood 5 feet 11 inches (1.80 m) tall and weighed 190 pounds (86 kg) in his playing days.

Scripture signed with the Baltimore Orioles after his matriculation from Wake Forest, but never reached the Major League Baseball level. He batted .252 in 891 games over nine seasons (1964–1972) in the Baltimore and New York Mets farm systems, with 58 home runs. His last five seasons as an active player were spent at the Triple-A level with the Rochester Red Wings and Tidewater Tides. Scripture then became a minor league manager and instructor in the Kansas City Royals and Pittsburgh Pirates systems, peaking at the Double-A level and having only one winning season in five years as a skipper.

However, Scripture earned a reputation throughout professional baseball for his intensity, dedication to teaching, and his toughness. The most quoted stories about Scripture described his habit of biting the covers off baseballs when frustrated. "Only lost one molar so far," Scripture said in 1975, "and that's a whole lot less expensive than an ulcer operation."

"He was tough, maybe the toughest I've ever seen," then-Royals athletic trainer Mickey Cobb told Sports Illustrated for a 1987 profile on Scripture. "I remember a time when he had 19 blisters on one hand from hitting. He just came in and poured alcohol on it. No Band-Aids. Other times, he would deliberately have someone hit flies out to the warning track so he could practice running full speed into the chain-link fence."

Yet he was also a highly respected coach and manager. "There were people who would complain that he was tough to work with, but there was never any question about his competence as an instructor or manager," then-Pirates farm director Branch Barrett Rickey told SI in 1987. "Almost everybody remembers him fondly. It's just that Bill's singularness of purpose sometimes clashed with the aims of individual minor league franchises. With Bill, there was not a lot of accommodation to the owner's needs."

After leaving the game in the mid-1980s, Scripture focused on his greatest passion, trap shooting. According to the Sports Illustrated profile, he opened a gun shop in Virginia Beach, Virginia, and operated shooting ranges. He was elected to the Wake Forest Athletics Hall of Fame in 1987. In 2002, he was named to the Atlantic Coast Conference 50th Anniversary Baseball Team.
