= Branch Rickey =

American baseball player, manager, and executive (1881–1965)

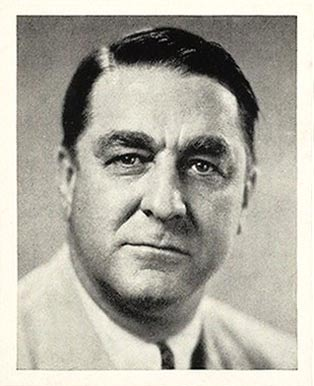
- Rickey in the 1930s with the Cardinals
- Catcher / Manager / Executive
- Born: December 20, 1881; Portsmouth, Ohio, U.S.
- Died: December 9, 1965 (aged 83); Columbia, Missouri, U.S.
- Batted: Left Threw: Right

MLB debut
- June 16, 1905, for the St. Louis Browns

Last MLB appearance
- August 25, 1914, for the St. Louis Browns

MLB statistics
- Batting average: .239
- Home runs: 3
- Runs batted in: 39
- Managerial record: 597–664–16
- Winning %: .473
- Stats at Baseball Reference
- Managerial record at Baseball Reference

Teams
- As player: St. Louis Browns (1905–1906); New York Highlanders (1907); St. Louis Browns (1914); As manager: St. Louis Browns (1913–1915); St. Louis Cardinals (1919–1925); As general manager: St. Louis Browns (1913–1916); St. Louis Cardinals (1917–1918, 1919–1942); Brooklyn Dodgers (1943–1950); Pittsburgh Pirates (1951–1955)

Career highlights and awards
- 4× World Series champion (1926, 1931, 1934, 1942); Played major part in development of the farm system; Signed Jackie Robinson for the Dodgers and helped integrate African-American players into Major League Baseball in 1947; St. Louis Cardinals Hall of Fame

Member of the National

Baseball Hall of Fame
- Induction: 1967
- Election method: Veterans Committee
Football career
Career information
College	Ohio Wesleyan University; University of Michigan
Career history
Playing
1902–1903	Shelby Blues
Coaching
1904–1905	Allegheny College
1907–1908	Ohio Wesleyan University
1910–1913	University of Michigan
Other information
Military career
Allegiance	United States
Branch	U.S. Army
Service years	1917–1918
Rank	Major
Units	Chemical Warfare Service; 1st Gas Regiment
Conflicts	World War I Western Front

Wesley Branch Rickey (December 20, 1881 – December 9, 1965) was an American professional baseball catcher, manager, sports executive, and team owner. He was instrumental in breaking the baseball color line by signing black player Jackie Robinson. He also created the framework for the modern minor league farm system, encouraged the major leagues to add new teams through his involvement in the proposed Continental League, introduced the batting helmet, and created the standard 20-80 scouting scale. He was posthumously elected to the Baseball Hall of Fame in 1967.

Rickey played 4 seasons in Major League Baseball (MLB) for the St. Louis Browns and New York Highlanders. After struggling as a player, Rickey returned to college, graduating from the University of Michigan. Back in the major leagues in 1913, he embarked on a successful career variously as a manager, executive, and owner, starting with the St. Louis Browns, then the St. Louis Cardinals, Brooklyn Dodgers and Pittsburgh Pirates. The Cardinals elected him to their team Hall of Fame in 2014.

Rickey also had a career in football, as a player for the professional Shelby Blues and as a coach at Ohio Wesleyan University and Allegheny College. He received the nickname "Mahatma" after sportswriter Tom Meany read an article describing Mahatma Gandhi as a combination of "your father and Tammany Hall."

== Early life ==
Rickey was born in Portsmouth, Ohio, the son of Jacob Frank Rickey and Emily (née Brown). Rickey was the uncle of Beth Rickey, a Louisiana political activist. He graduated from Valley High School in Lucasville, Ohio, in 1899.

== College ==
Rickey was a catcher on the baseball team at Ohio Wesleyan University, where he obtained his B.A. Rickey was a member of the Delta Tau Delta fraternity.

Rickey attended the University of Michigan, where he received his LL.B.

While at Michigan, Rickey applied for the job as Michigan's baseball coach. Rickey asked every alumnus he had ever met to write letters to Philip Bartelme, the school's athletic director, on his behalf. Bartelme recalled, "Day after day those letters came in." Bartelme was reportedly impressed with Rickey's passion for baseball and his idealism about the proper role of athletics on a college campus. Bartelme convinced the dean of the law school that Rickey could handle his law studies while serving as the school's baseball coach. Bartelme reportedly called Rickey into his office to tell him he had the job if only "to put a stop to those damn letters that come in every day." The hiring also marked the beginning of a lifelong friendship and business relationship between Rickey and Bartelme. Bartelme and Rickey worked together for most of the next 35 years."

During his four years as head baseball coach from 1910 to 1913, Rickey's record was 68–32–4. In his final season, the Michigan squad — led by brilliant sophomore first baseman and left-handed pitcher, future Hall of Famer George Sisler, who batted .445 — compiled a 21–4–1 won-lost record, a winning percentage of .827.

== Playing career ==
Before his front office days, Rickey played both football and baseball professionally.

=== Professional football career ===
In 1902, Rickey played professional football for the Shelby Blues of the "Ohio League", the direct predecessor to the modern National Football League (NFL.) Rickey often played for pay with Shelby while he was attending Ohio Wesleyan. During his time with Shelby, Rickey became friends with his teammate Charles Follis, who was the first black professional football player. He also played against him on October 17, 1903, when Follis ran for a 70-yard touchdown against the Ohio Wesleyan football team. After that game Rickey praised Follis, calling him "a wonder." It is also possible that Follis' poise and class under the pressures of such racial tension, as well as his exceptional play in spite of it, inspired Rickey to sign Jackie Robinson decades later. Rickey, however, stated his inspiration for bringing Jackie Robinson into baseball was the ill-treatment he saw received by his black catcher Charles Thomas on the Ohio Wesleyan baseball team coached by Rickey in 1903 and 1904 and the gentlemanly way Thomas handled it. When Rickey signed Robinson, Charles Thomas' story was made known in the papers.

=== Professional baseball career ===
==== Minor leagues ====
In 1903, Rickey signed a contract with the Terre Haute Hottentots of the Class B Central League, making his professional debut on June 20. He was assigned to the Le Mars Blackbirds of the Class D Iowa–South Dakota League. During this period, he also spent two seasons–1904 and 1905—coaching baseball, basketball and football at Allegheny College in Pennsylvania, where he also served as athletic director and as an instructor of Shakespeare, English, and freshman history.

==== Major leagues ====
===== St. Louis Browns (1905–1906) =====
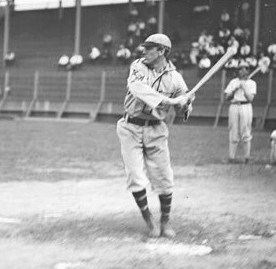
Rickey batting for the St. Louis Browns in 1906

A left-handed-batting catcher, Rickey debuted in the major leagues with the St. Louis Browns in 1905.

===== New York Highlanders (1907) =====
Sold to the New York Highlanders in 1907, Rickey could neither hit nor field while with the club, and his batting average dropped below .200. One opposing team stole 13 bases in one game while Rickey was behind the plate, which was an American League record until 1911. Rickey also injured his throwing arm and retired as a player following that season.

== Managerial and executive career ==
=== St. Louis Browns (1913–1916) ===
Rickey was in his third year as the Wolverines' baseball coach when St. Louis Browns owner Robert Hedges inquired if Rickey was interested in running the minor-league Kansas City Blues, which Hedges was thinking of purchasing. Citing his commitment to Michigan, Rickey turned him down, but agreed to do some part-time scouting for the Browns in the West during the summer of 1912. That September, Hedges offered Rickey a job as his top assistant and business manager of the MLB Browns themselves, at a substantial salary increase, effective after Michigan's 1913 baseball season. Rickey signed the deal on June 1, 1913. After three months in the Browns' front office, on September 17, 1913, the 31 year-old Rickey was also appointed field manager, replacing incumbent George Stovall. Veteran players Jimmy Austin and, later, Burt Shotton, became Rickey's "Sunday managers", running the Browns on the Sabbath in the devout Rickey's absence.

The Browns, in the midst of one of several low points during their 52-year history, were 52–90 and in last place at the time. Rickey steered them to a 5–6–1 record over the last 12 games of the 1913 season. Then, in 1914, they improved by 14 games, jumping from eighth to fifth place in the American League. However, the 1915 Browns took a giant step backwards; despite the June signing of the player who would become one of the greatest in franchise history—future Hall of Famer George Sisler—they went only 63–91, 8½ games worse than in 1914 edition.

Still, Rickey maintained Hedges' confidence. But during the 1915–1916 offseason, as part of Major League Baseball's settlement of the Federal League "war", Hedges sold the Browns to the former operator of the Federal League's St. Louis Terriers, Philip DeCatesby Ball. Ball brought along his own manager, Fielder Jones, and restricted an unhappy Rickey to front-office duties. Compounding matters, the pair's personalities clashed, and as the 1916 season concluded, Rickey began looking for a new job.

=== St. Louis Cardinals (1917–1942) ===
==== Early years and World War I service (1917–1918) ====
At the same time, Rickey was struggling with ownership change and on-field failings with the American League St. Louis Browns, the National League's St. Louis Cardinals were also enduring a period of turmoil with both. In 1916, they had finished eighth and last in the NL and attracted a league-worst 224,308 fans to Robison Field, and their owner, Helene Hathaway Britton, put them up for sale. A local consortium of businessmen, including automobile dealer Sam Breadon, quickly formed to buy the financially strapped team and keep it from moving elsewhere. Searching for a chief executive, they reached out to seven St. Louis sportswriters and asked for recommendations; all seven separately suggested Rickey.

Before Rickey could join the Cardinals, he had to sort out his existing obligations to Ball and the Browns. American League president and founder Ban Johnson, determined to keep Rickey in his league, pressured Ball to seek a temporary injunction to enforce the terms of Rickey's contract. The dispute was resolved in April 1917, and Rickey became the Cardinals' club president, business manager, and a minority owner. Apart from his year as president of the Continental League in 1959–1960, Rickey spent the remainder of his baseball career in the National League.

Each of Rickey's first two seasons with the Cardinals was overshadowed by the United States' entry into World War I, on April 6, 1917.

Despite the team's last-place standing in 1916, Rickey inherited two Hall-of-Fame quality assets: 21-year-old infielder Rogers Hornsby and the Cardinals' manager, Miller Huggins. Each contributed to a strong bounce-back season in 1917: Hornsby batted .327 in 145 games and led the team in hits, and Huggins guided the squad to 82 wins and a third-place finish. During the 1920s, Hornsby became the cornerstone of a National League pennant contender and 1926 World Series champion. But Huggins, who had been a member of a rival ownership group that lost its bid for the Cardinals to Breadon's syndicate, left to manage the New York Yankees at season's end; there he led an eventual American League and MLB powerhouse to six pennants and three world championships before dying at 51 during the 1929 season.

The war-disrupted 1918 campaign saw the Cardinals, managed by veteran minor-league pilot Jack Hendricks, perform poorly. They plummeted to last place in the National League, winning only 51 of 131 games during the shortened regular season, which ended September 2. But by that point Rickey had enlisted as an officer in the United States Army. His absence from the team began August 31, 1918.

He embarked by steamship for France and the Western Front in mid-September. Recovering from a bout of pneumonia contracted aboard ship, Rickey commanded a training unit of the Chemical Warfare Service that included Ty Cobb and Christy Mathewson. His unit saw action as part of the First Gas Regiment. Six weeks after arriving, the November 11, 1918, armistice ended hostilities, and Rickey returned to the U.S. on December 23. He succeeded Hendricks as the Cardinals' field manager for 1919.

==== Field manager (1919–1925) ====
Rickey's record as manager of the Cardinals from 1919 through the first 38 games of 1925 was a relatively mediocre (458–485–4, .486). The team improved from 53 victories in 1919 to 75 in 1920, peaked at 87-66 in 1921, saw two more winning seasons in 1922 and 1923, then fell off to losing in 1924, and losing worse in 1925.

Already in 1920, the ownership of the team had stabilized when Sam Breadon purchased controlling interest and took over from Rickey as club president.

On the field, the club was led by second baseman Hornsby, who batted over .400 three times (and .397 once). Others—such as Jack Fournier, Jesse Haines, Austin McHenry and Jack Smith—also contributed to the team's surge. But McHenry's tragic death from a brain tumor in 1922 was a difficult blow. The team fell from 87 to 85 to 79 wins over the 1921–1923 period; then in 1924 dropped below .500 and finished 76–78.

Off the field, Rickey and Breadon pursued a farm system concept for the sport. By 1923, the Cardinals had ownership stakes or affiliations with five minor-league teams, including top-level Syracuse, Class A Houston, and Class C Fort Smith; though there were minor league and semipro teams and leagues nationwide, the Detroit Tigers were the only other major-league club with as much as a single "farm team".

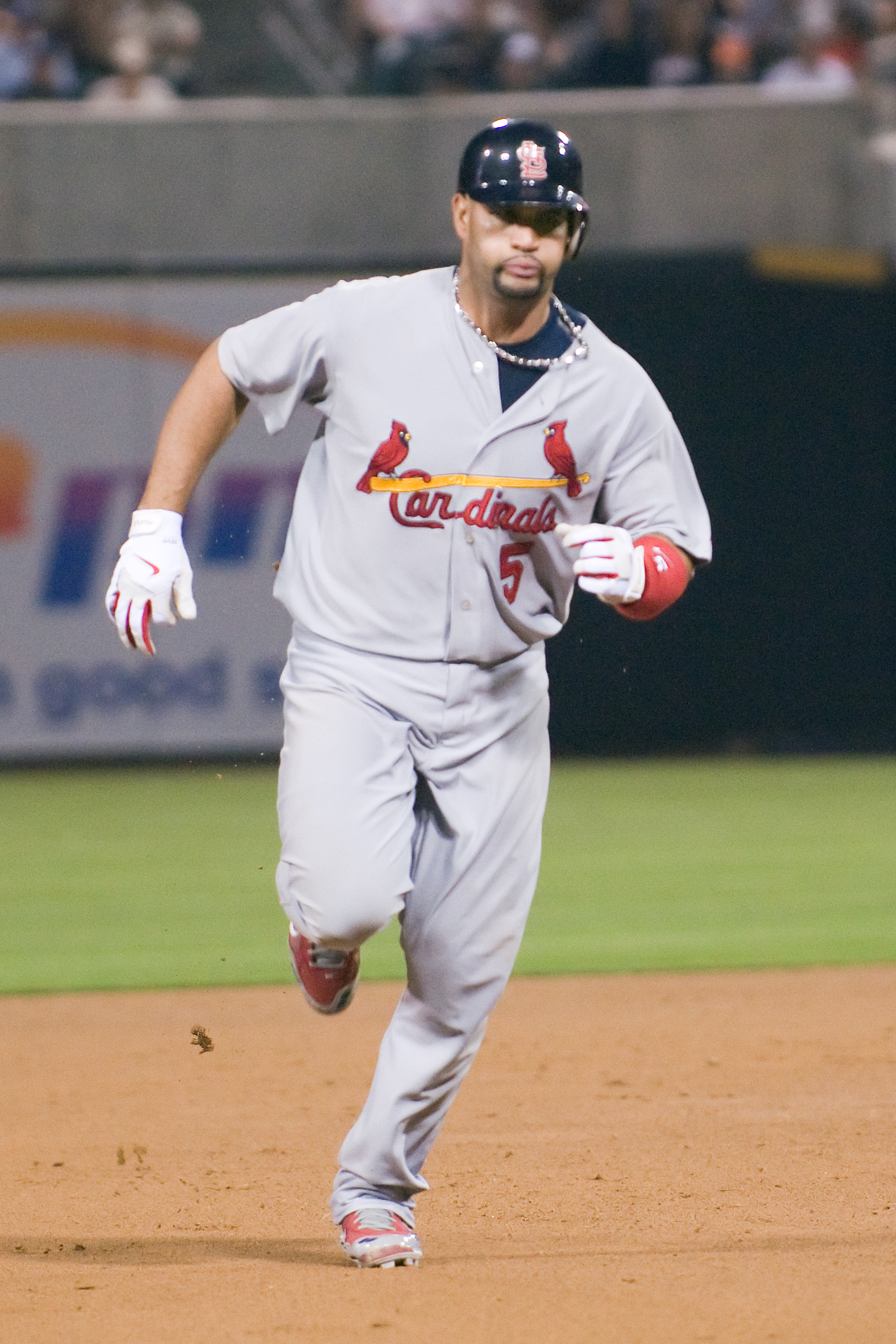
Future Hall of Famer Albert Pujols showing Rickey's famous Redbirds logo in 2008

On the big league squad, future Hall of Famer Jim Bottomley took over at first base in just his second season, batting .371 with 194 hits. Twenty-year-old Ohio Wesleyan graduate Howard Freigau started 81 games at shortstop, and outfielders Ray Blades and Heinie Mueller became key contributors. The rosters of Rickey's farm teams in 1923 included another future Hall of Famer, Chick Hafey, as well as future 1920s Cardinal standouts Les Bell, Taylor Douthit, Fred Frankhouse, and Wattie Holm.

Along with improving player development, Rickey improved the Cardinals' appearance on the field. The team's distinctive logo of two brilliant red cardinals perched on a baseball bat first appeared in the 1922 season. Rickey had noticed a similar arrangement on a sign at a Presbyterian church in Ferguson, Missouri, he was speaking at. It had been designed by Allie May Schmidt, whose father was a graphic designer. St. Louis jerseys bear the perched redbirds over the name "Cardinals", with the letter "C" of the word hooked over the bat.

In 1923, Rickey experimented with placing uniform numbers on jersey sleeves to help fans identify players. The practice was abandoned after only one season, and it was another decade until big-league teams put larger numbers on the backs of uniform shirts.

==== Business/general manager (1925–1942) ====
When the Cardinals' 1925 season started 13-25, Breadon fired Rickey as manager of the last-place club on May 30, already 13 games out of the lead. Rogers Hornsby took over as player–manager.

The 43 year-old Rickey had already been a player, manager, executive, and minority owner in the Major Leagues; still, there was little indication true greatness in the sport still lay ahead.

In spite of the firing Breadon could not deny Rickey's acumen for player development, and asked him to stay to run the front office. An embittered Rickey wailed, "You can't do this to me, Sam. You are ruining me." "No," Breadon replied, "I am doing you the greatest favor one man has ever done to another."

His job title was business manager; the general manager role in Major League Baseball had not yet been developed. Regardless, Rickey's purview and skills spanned farm system development, roster construction, scouting, player acquisition and development, and business affairs—all among the responsibilities of 20th-century GMs. In the quarter century between 1926 and 1950, Rickey's Cardinals and Dodgers teams won eight National League titles; the teams he left behind won six more pennants within five years immediately after his departure from their front offices.

Meanwhile, in 1926, Hornsby's first full year as manager, the new skipper led the Cardinals to their first World Series championship.

===== Development of the farm system =====
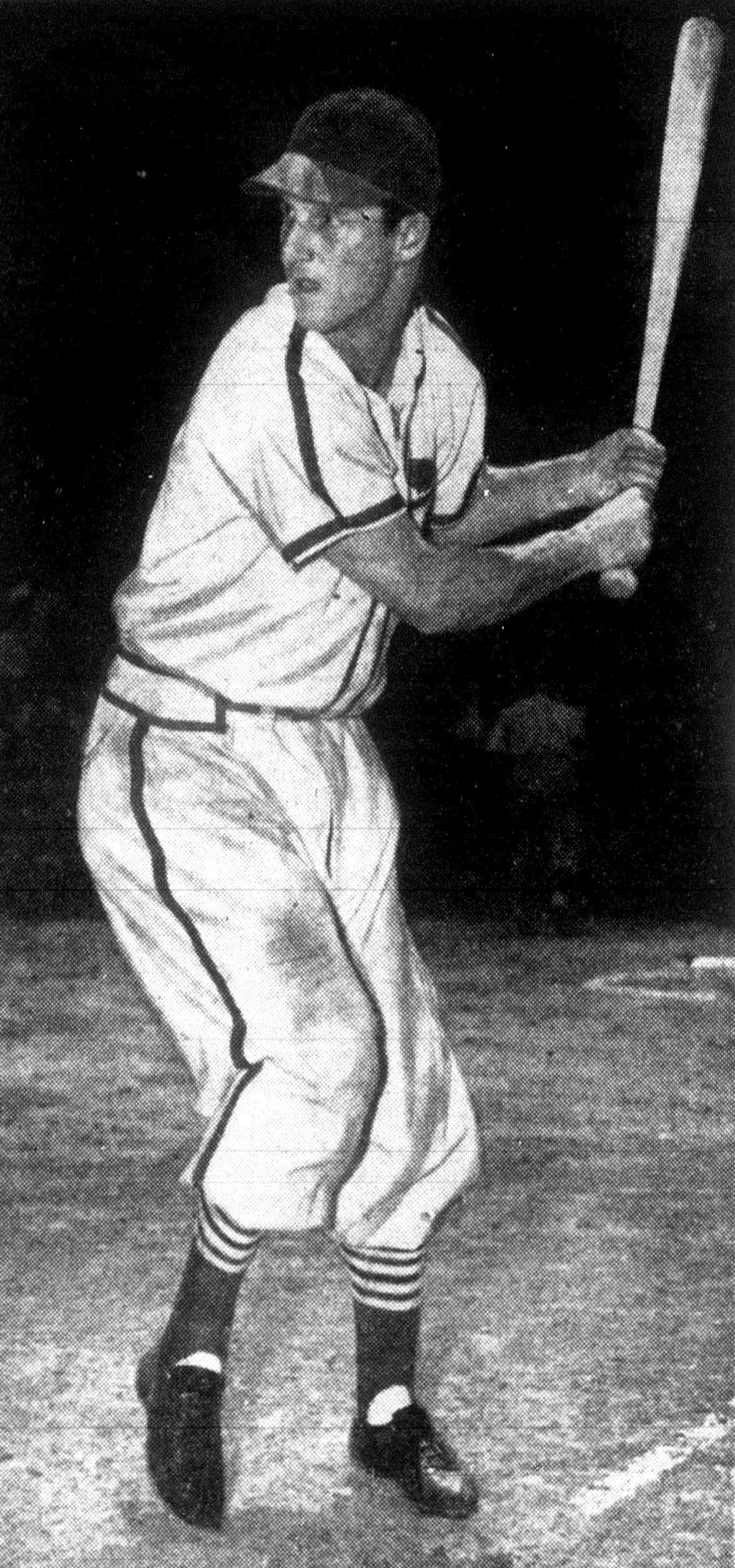
Farm product Stan Musial went to become a 20-time big league All-Star, 3-time NL MVP, and iconic baseball Hall of Famer. Pictured in 1953.

Two more pennants followed in 1928 and 1930, followed by World Series losses. By 1931, the Cardinals were the class of the National League. They won 101 games in 1931 and won the World Series in seven games over the defending champion, the powerhouse Foxx-Simmons-Grove Philadelphia Athletics. The star of the 1931 World Series was rookie Pepper Martin, a 1928 graduate of Rickey's player development system. With eight owned or affiliated farm teams by 1931, the system was fed by the Cardinals' scouting corps, headed by Charley Barrett, who introduced tryout camps to keep the pipeline filled with young amateur talent from across the U.S. Soon, other organization graduates joined the team, among them future Hall of Famers Dizzy Dean and Joe "Ducky" Medwick, and Dean's brother Paul "Daffy" Dean. All three were integral parts of the 1934 Cardinals' "Gashouse Gang", who won the franchise's third World Series title.

Despite the ravages of The Great Depression, the Cardinal farm system continued to expand during the 1930s, with 21 teams by 1935, 28 in 1936, and 33 in 1937. Major League Baseball Commissioner Kenesaw Mountain Landis was concerned that Rickey's minor league system, which both concentrated talent and constantly promoted a team's best players to the next league up, was going to ruin baseball by destroying minor-league teams; he twice released over 70 Cardinal minor leaguers. But despite Landis's efforts, Rickey's minor-league system thrived; every major league adopted a similar systems within a few years. Arguably, the farm system saved the minor leagues, by keeping them a necessary part of baseball during the television age, when fans anywhere could watch big-league games at home or a bar. Minor-league attendance declined, but the bottom never fell out.

Rickey continued to develop the Cardinals into the early 1940s, with his final team in St. Louis having the best season in franchise history, winning 106 games and the 1942 World Series. The 1942 Cardinals were led by a new crop of home grown players, including two future Hall of Famers, Enos Slaughter and Stan Musial; and several others, including future NL MVP Marty Marion, were among the best at their position during their eras. Even their manager Billy Southworth was a product of their farm system.

=== Brooklyn Dodgers (1943–1950) ===
In spite of St. Louis's World Series championship success in 1942, bigger opportunities within baseball beckoned to Rickey. When his good friend Brooklyn Dodgers general manager Larry MacPhail enlisted in the army to serve in World War II, the Dodgers hired Rickey to replace him as president and general manager, ending a tenure of over two decades with the Cardinals. In 1945, the Dodger ownership reorganized, with Rickey acquiring 25% of Dodger stock to become an equal partner with three other owners.

==== Further innovations ====
Rickey continued to innovate in his time with Brooklyn. He was responsible for the first full-time spring training facility, in Vero Beach, Florida, and encouraged the use of now commonplace tools such as the batting cage, pitching machines, and batting helmets. He also pioneered the use of statistical inference in baseball (now called sabermetrics), when he hired statistician Allan Roth as a full-time analyst for the Dodgers in 1947. After viewing Roth's evidence, Rickey promoted the idea that on-base percentage was a more important hitting statistic than batting average. While working under Rickey, Roth was also the first person to provide statistical evidence that platoon effects were real and quantifiable.

==== Breaking the color barrier ====
Rickey's most memorable act with the Dodgers was signing Jackie Robinson, thus breaking baseball's color barrier, which had been an unwritten rule since the 1880s. This policy had continued under a succession of baseball leaders, including Landis, who openly opposed integrating Major League Baseball. Landis died in 1944, but Rickey had already set the process in motion, having sought (and gained) the Dodgers Board of Directors' approval in 1943 to begin the search for "the right man".

In early 1945, Rickey was anticipating the integration of black players into Major League Baseball. Along with Gus Greenlee, the owner of the original Pittsburgh Crawfords, Rickey created the United States League (USL) as a method to scout black players, specifically to break the color line. It is unclear whether the league actually played the 1945 season or was only used as a pretext for integration. Around this time, Rickey held tryouts of black players, saying he was forming a new USL team, the "Brooklyn Brown Dodgers". In fact, the Dodgers were looking for the right man to break the color line.

On August 28, 1945, Rickey signed Robinson, who never played in the USL, to a minor-league contract. Robinson had been playing in the Negro leagues for the Kansas City Monarchs. On October 23, 1945, it was announced that Robinson would join the Montreal Royals, the Dodgers' International League affiliate, for the 1946 season. He became the league batting champion and led the Royals to a dominant league championship.

There was no statute officially banning blacks from baseball, only a universally recognized unwritten rule that no club owner was prepared to break, perpetuated by culturally entrenched racism and club owners' desire to be perceived as representing the values and beliefs of everyday American white men. Black Americans' service in World War II and their celebrated prewar achievements in American sports, such as those of Joe Louis in boxing and Jesse Owens in track, helped pave the way for the cultural shift necessary to break the barrier.

Rickey knew that Robinson would face racism and discrimination. He made clear in their first meeting that he anticipated widespread resistance both inside and outside baseball to opening its doors to black players. As he predicted, right from the start Robinson faced obstacles among his teammates and other players. No matter how harsh white people were to Robinson, he could not retaliate. Robinson had agreed with Rickey not to lose his temper and jeopardize the chances of all the blacks who would follow him if he could help break down the barrier.

In Ken Burns's documentary Baseball, Red Barber says that Rickey's determination to desegregate Major League Baseball was born of a combination of idealism and astute business sense. The idealism was at least partially rooted in an incident involving a team for which Rickey had worked. While managing at Ohio Wesleyan University, a black player, Charles Thomas, was extremely upset at being refused accommodation because of his race at the hotel where the team stayed. Infuriated, Rickey got him into the hotel for the night, but never forgot the incident and later said, "I may not be able to do something about racism in every field, but I can sure do something about it in baseball." The business element was based on the fact that the Negro leagues had numerous star athletes and the first Major League team to hire them would get the first pick of the players at an attractive price. At the time, Mexican brewery czar Jorge Pasquel was raiding America for black talent (e.g. Satchel Paige), as well as disgruntled white players, for the Mexican League, with the idea to create an integrated league that could compete with the U.S. major leagues. However idealistic he was, Rickey did not compensate Monarchs ownership for the rights to obtain Robinson, nor did he pay for rights to Don Newcombe, who also joined the Dodgers from a Negro leagues club. Rickey also tried to sign Monte Irvin, but Newark Eagles business owner Effa Manley refused to allow Irvin to leave her club without compensation. When she threatened to sue him, Rickey stopped pursuing Irvin, who later signed with the New York Giants.

==== Later career with Dodgers ====
From 1945 to 1950, Rickey was one of four owners of the Dodgers, each with one quarter of the franchise. When one of the four (John L. Smith) died, Walter O'Malley took control of that quarter. Also in 1950, Rickey's contract as Dodger president expired, and O'Malley decided that were Rickey to retain the job, almost all of Rickey's power would be gone; for example, he would no longer take a percentage of every franchise sale. Rickey declined a new contract as president. Then, to be a majority owner, O'Malley offered to buy Rickey's portion. Seeing no reason to hold on to the club, Rickey agreed. In a final retaliation against O'Malley, Rickey instead offered the club percentage to a friend for $1 million. His chances at complete franchise control at risk, O'Malley was forced to offer more money, and Rickey finally sold his portion for $1.05 million (about $14,100,000 in 2025 dollars).

=== Pittsburgh Pirates (1951–1955) ===
Immediately upon leaving the Dodgers, Rickey was offered the position of executive vice president and general manager of the Pittsburgh Pirates by the team's new majority owner, John W. Galbreath. He joined them on November 1, 1950, one month after the 1950 Bucs, who lost 96 out of 153 games, finished in last place for only the third time in the 20th century. With an average player age of 28.6 years, they also were one of the oldest teams in the National League. Bringing several key aides with him from Brooklyn, Rickey began a teardown/rebuilding process that consumed his five-year term as general manager. The Pirates finished eighth (and last) four times and seventh once, compiled a 269–501 (.349) won–lost record, and in 1952 finished 42–112, lagging behind the champion Dodgers by 541/2 games. It was the second-worst season in franchise history and the fourth-worst in modern (post-1900) baseball history. After presiding over one last-place season with the Pirates, Rickey proposed cutting the pay of power-hitting superstar Ralph Kiner. When Kiner objected, Rickey famously quipped, "Son, we could have finished last without you!"

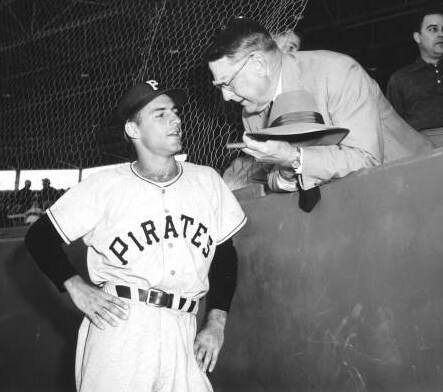
Rickey speaks with young shortstop Dick Groat in 1955, his final year as general manager of the Pirates

Perhaps Rickey's most notable innovation during his Pittsburgh tenure was in 1953, when the Pirates became the first team to permanently adopt batting helmets on both offense and defense. These helmets resembled a primitive fiberglass "miner's cap". This was the mandate of Rickey, who also owned stock in the company producing the helmets. Under his orders, all Pirate players had to wear the helmets both at bat and in the field. But within a few weeks, the team began to abandon the helmets on defense, partly because of their weight. Once the Pirates discarded the helmets on defense, the trend disappeared from the game.

Health problems forced Rickey to retire in 1955. The Pirates were still mired in the NL basement and did not have another winning record until 1958. But with an average age of 25.5, they were the youngest outfit in the Senior Circuit in 1955. Rickey's contributions helped lead to a World Series championship for Pittsburgh in 1960. In 2000, author Andrew O'Toole wrote, "The core of the 1960 championship team [notably Roberto Clemente, Dick Groat, Bill Mazeroski, Elroy Face, and Vern Law] was put together and nurtured by Rickey."

Rickey fast-tracked youngsters like Law and Bob Friend, signed by his predecessor, Roy Hamey, to the majors. He recruited Groat from Duke University and drafted Face and Clemente from Brooklyn's minor-league system. His scouts and minor-league instructors found Mazeroski and developed him for MLB delivery in 1956. Pittsburgh's farm and scouting system remained highly productive into the 1970s, especially in developing Latin American players signed by scout Howie Haak, one of the people Rickey had brought to the Pirates from the Dodgers.

Rickey remained on the Pirate masthead as chairman of the board for almost four full seasons after Joe L. Brown succeeded him as general manager in October 1955. He also held a small amount of stock in the club. But that association ended in August 1959, when, nearing his 78th birthday, Rickey took on another challenge as the chief executive of a proposed third major league, the Continental League.

=== President of Continental League (1959–1960) ===
A significant shift in population from the Eastern and Midwestern United States to the West and South after World War II wreaked havoc with the established 16-team, two-league major league structure, opening up growing markets and triggering a two-decade-long series of franchise relocations beginning in 1953. In 1957, these were dramatized by the transfer of each of New York City's National League teams, the Dodgers and Giants, to California, abandoning their established fan bases. When mayor Robert F. Wagner Jr. and attorney William Shea were unsuccessful in their attempts to attract Senior Circuit teams from smaller markets (including the Pirates) to New York, Shea announced plans for a third major league in professional baseball, the Continental League, on July 27, 1959. In addition to New York, the Continental would be represented by clubs in Denver, Houston, Minneapolis–Saint Paul and Toronto, plus three additional markets to round out an eight-team league. It was scheduled to begin play in April 1961.

Three weeks after the formation of the new circuit was announced, on August 18, 1959, Rickey sold his stake in the Pirates, resigned as board chairman, and signed a 16-month contract to become the first president of the new league at a reported $50,000 annual salary (equivalent to approximately $552,226 in 2025). He immediately led a delegation of Continental League owners to a summit meeting in a Manhattan hotel with Commissioner of Baseball Ford Frick, the presidents of the National and American leagues, and a subcommittee of MLB club owners. The established leagues were wary of a new challenge to baseball's antitrust law exemption, when the chairman of the House Judiciary Committee, Emanuel Celler, a Brooklyn Democrat enraged by his borough's loss of the Dodgers, introduced legislation that would place baseball under antitrust law. This concern led Frick and his entourage to publicly treat the Continental League with respect; at the meeting, Frick asked Rickey and the other league presidents (Warren Giles and Joe Cronin) to form a committee that would set up ground rules to govern the admission of the Continental to eventual equal status with the two major leagues.

As those rules were taking shape, Rickey presided over the admission of the Continental League's three remaining founding franchises: Atlanta, Buffalo and Dallas–Fort Worth. He made public appearances—for example, as the "mystery guest" on the prime-time TV quiz show What's My Line?—to advance his view that a third, eight-team league would be more beneficial to baseball than expansion of the two existing circuits. But behind the scenes, National and American league owners were working on their own plans to expand their loops and scuttle Rickey's start-up league. In August 1960, they offered the Continental League's owners a deal: each established league would add two new franchises by 1962. In return, they demanded that the new circuit disband. Against Rickey's advice, his owners agreed to the compromise and the new league perished, still on the drawing board.

In 1961, Minneapolis–Saint Paul got a 60-year-old American League franchise, the transferred Washington Senators, with an expansion team replacing them in the capital. In 1962, the New York Mets and Houston Colt .45s were admitted to the Senior Circuit as expansion teams. By 1993, all of the Continental League's cities except Buffalo were in Major League Baseball.

=== Return to Cardinals (1962–1964) ===
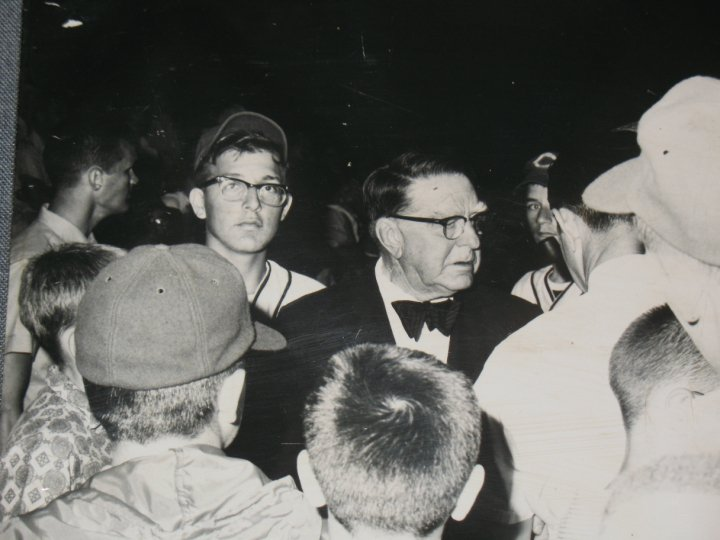
Rickey in Cincinnati in the early 1960s

After negotiations broke down in March 1961 that would have seen Rickey take over the Mets as their first president and general manager, he went into temporary retirement. The year also saw Rickey endure tragedy and hardship on a personal level. On April 10, 1961, his son, Branch Jr., farm system director of the Pirates, died from complications of diabetes at the age of 47. Then, on June 27, Rickey suffered a "serious" heart attack—his second cardiac event since 1958—while staying at his summer home on Canada's Manitoulin Island and was airlifted to a Sudbury, Ontario, hospital for treatment. Upon his recovery, Rickey and his wife, Jane, decided to move from suburban Pittsburgh back to St. Louis in 1962, where, on October 29, Rickey returned to the Cardinals exactly 20 years to the day he left to become general consultant on the development of Cardinal players and special advisor to owner August A. Busch Jr.

But Rickey's second stint with the Cardinals was marred by controversy. He recommended that Cardinal icon Stan Musial be compelled to retire, even after the eventual Hall of Famer's stellar 1962 season, in which Musial, 41, had finished third in the National League batting race (hitting .330 in 135 games played), and broken Honus Wagner's NL record for career hits. Rickey wrote to Busch: "He can't run, he can't field, and he can't throw. Twenty-five Musials would finish in last place." Musial would play one more campaign before retiring from the field in September 1963.

Rickey also undermined St. Louis general manager Bing Devine, who had begun his baseball career under Rickey in the late 1930s as an office boy. He was a vocal critic of one of Devine's highest profile (and most successful) trades, when he acquired veteran shortstop Groat from Pittsburgh after the 1962 season. Rickey believed that Groat, 32 at the time, was too old. Groat, however, still had two prime years left. He batted .319 (1963) and .292 (1964), and was runner-up in the National League's 1963 Most Valuable Player Award balloting. He was the NL's starting shortstop in both the 1963 and 1964 All-Star games, and helped lead the 1963 Cardinals to a second-place finish. But the 1964 team fell behind in the standings and seemed stalled in fifth place in mid-August. When Busch fired Devine on August 17 and replaced him with Rickey protégé Bob Howsam, the 82-year-old consultant and special advisor was cast as the cause of Devine's downfall. The controversial firing embarrassed Busch when the team Devine assembled caught fire in the season's final six weeks, won the National League pennant, and triumphed in the 1964 World Series. After the season, Busch terminated Rickey's contract, ending a professional baseball career that had spanned 62 years.

== Personal life ==
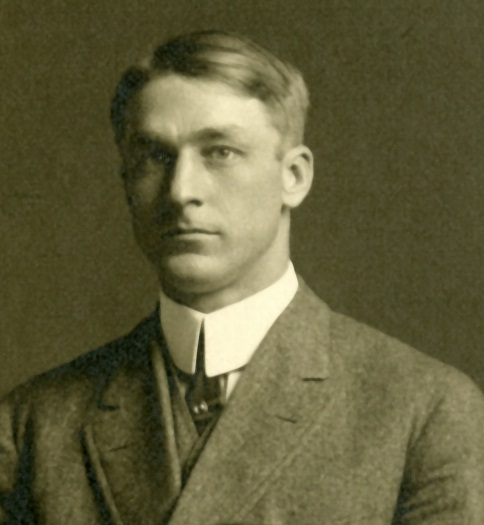
Rickey in 1912

Rickey was a Freemason, first at Lucasville Lodge #465 in Ohio, then at Tuscan Lodge #360 in St. Louis. After arriving in Brooklyn, Rickey joined Montauk Masonic Lodge #286 in Brooklyn. In 1906 he married Jane Moulton. They had several children; the most famous of them was Branch Rickey Jr., who also became an executive in Major League Baseball.

Stricken with tuberculosis, he sought treatment in Saranac Lake, New York in 1908 and 1909 at the Trudeau Sanatorium. Later, he moved into the Jacob Schiff cottage.

== Death ==
A public speaker in his later years, on November 13, 1965, Rickey collapsed in the middle of a speech in Columbia, Missouri, as he was being elected to the Missouri Sports Hall of Fame. He had told a story of physical courage and was about to relate an illustration from the Bible. "Now I'm going to tell you a story from the Bible about spiritual courage," he said. Rickey murmured he could not continue, collapsed and never spoke again. He faltered, fell back into his seat and slipped onto the floor. He never regained consciousness. His brain was damaged when his breathing stopped momentarily, though his heart picked up its rhythm again. Through the next 26 days, hospitalized in a coma, there was little change.

On December 9 at about 10 p.m., he died of heart failure at Boone County Memorial Hospital in Columbia, Missouri, 11 days before his 84th birthday. Branch Rickey was interred at Rush Township Burial Park in Rushtown, Ohio, near where his parents, his widow, Jane (who died in 1971), and three of his children (including Branch Jr.) also rest. Rickey's grave overlooks the Scioto Valley, about three miles from his boyhood home in Lucasville, Ohio.

== Honors and legacy ==
According to historian Harold Seymour:

Branch Rickey stands forth as professional baseball's counterpart of that oldest stereotype of American folklore, the shrewd hard-working, God-fearing Yankee trader. He was also one of baseball's genuine innovators, an administrator who made a lasting imprint upon the industry....[His] seeming contradictions between profession and practice, together with this skill and oratorical obfuscation and circumlocution, caused many to regard Rickey as a hypocritical mountebank. Yet even his detractors acknowledged Rickey's industriousness, organizing genius, an unsurpassed ability to judge the potential of raw recruits.... Rickey built the Cardinals into a baseball empire that, at its peak, comprised 32 clubs, 600 or 700 players, and an investment of more than $2 million.

In addition to Rickey's election to the Baseball Hall of Fame as a contributor in 1967, in 1997 he was inducted into the St. Louis Walk of Fame, in 2009 he was elected to the College Baseball Hall of Fame.

In January 2014, the Cardinals announced Rickey among 22 former players and personnel to be inducted into the St. Louis Cardinals Hall of Fame and Museum for the inaugural class of 2014.

A ballpark in Portsmouth, Ohio, once used by the Portsmouth Explorers, a charter member of the Frontier League before the club folded in 1996, is named in Rickey's honor. The Branch Rickey Arena at Ohio Wesleyan University is also named in his honor.

A section of US Highway 23 in Ohio, running north from the Franklin County border to the city of Delaware, has been named the Branch Rickey Memorial Highway.

In 1992, Rotary International of Denver, Colorado, created the Branch Rickey Award, which is given annually to a Major League Baseball player in recognition of exceptional community service. Outside of Coors Field in Denver is a monument to Rickey by the sculptor George Lundeen, dedicated in 2005, with this simple inscription:

It is not the honor that you take with you but the heritage you leave behind.

Another quotation attributed to Rickey is:

Luck is the residue of design.

Members of his family also became involved in baseball. Son Branch Jr. was an executive with the Dodgers and Pirates for over two decades prior to his 1961 death, and grandson Branch Rickey III served as a farm system director with the Pirates and Cincinnati Reds and president of the Triple-A American Association and Pacific Coast League during a 57-year baseball career. His brother Frank Wanzer Rickey (1888–1953) scouted for the Cardinals and Dodgers; his signees included Hall of Famers Slaughter and Johnny Mize. Frank Rickey's son-in-law, Charles A. Hurth (1906–1969), was a longtime minor league executive who served as president of the Double-A Southern Association and, from mid-April 1960 through mid-November 1961, as the first general manager of the Mets, including the period when Branch Rickey and the team were discussing a top role for Rickey in the New York front office.

Moreover, Rickey's influence continued to loom large after his passing, especially in the National League. One year after his 1965 death, five of the league's ten general managers—Howsam (Cardinals), Devine (Mets), Brown (Pirates), Buzzie Bavasi (Dodgers) and Bill DeWitt (Reds), as well as NL president Giles—had at one time worked under Rickey during his long executive career.

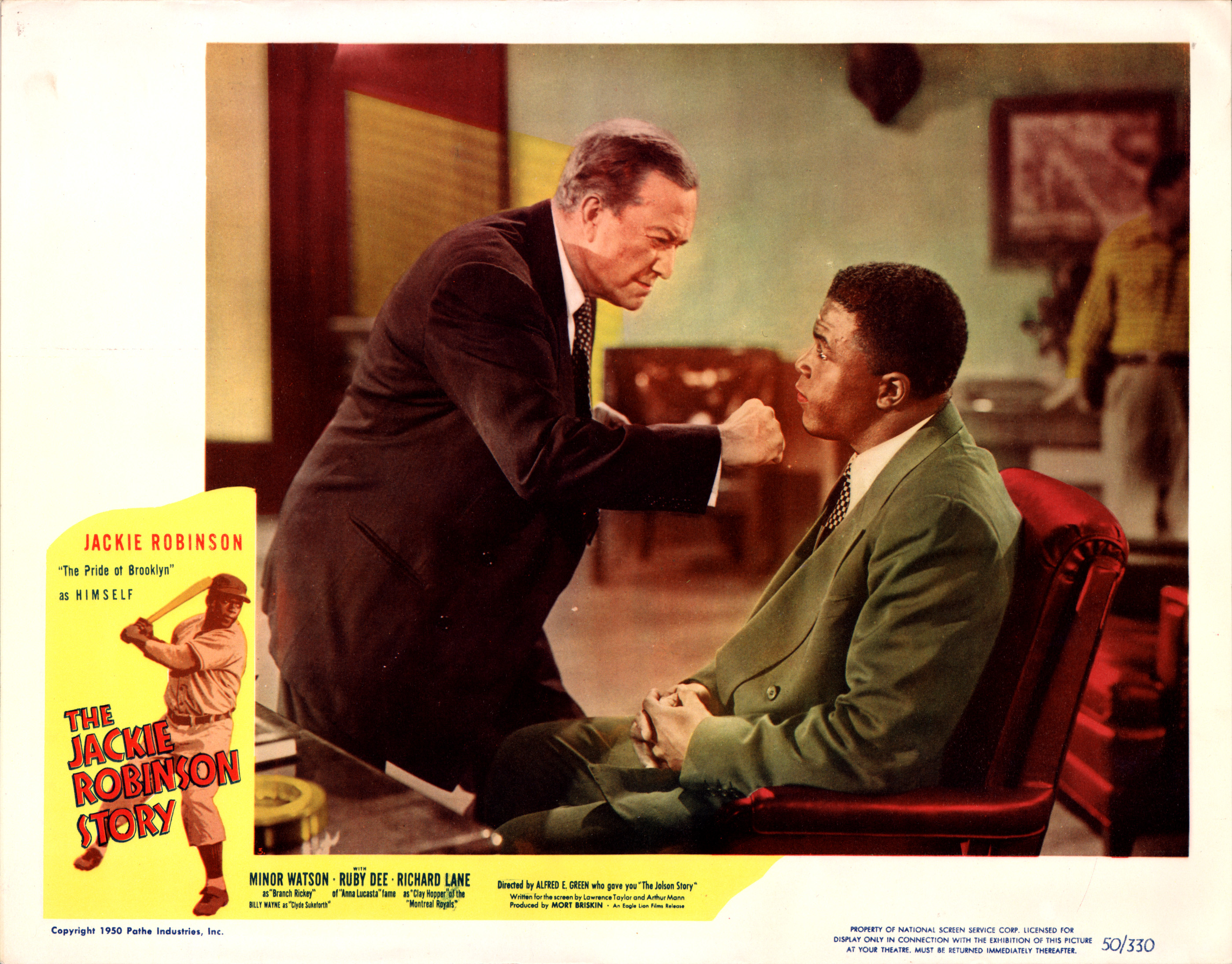
Lobby card for The Jackie Robinson Story, 1950. Minor Watson (left) portrays Rickey and Jackie Robinson portrays himself

=== Portrayals on stage, film and television ===
Due to his connection with Jackie Robinson, Rickey has been portrayed numerous times on screen and stage:

- In the 1950 movie The Jackie Robinson Story, he is portrayed by Minor Watson.
- In the 1996 HBO movie Soul of the Game, Rickey is played by Edward Herrmann.
- In the 2013 film 42, Rickey is played by Harrison Ford. Rickey's great-granddaughter, actress Kelley Jakle, also appears in the film.
- Rickey is the title character in the 1989 Edward Schmidt play Mr. Rickey Calls a Meeting, a fictionalized version of the meeting in which Rickey offered Jackie Robinson a major-league contract.

Additionally, he was also featured heavily in the 2016 PBS documentary, Jackie Robinson, which was directed by Ken Burns.

== Baseball records ==
=== Managerial record ===
Team	Year	Regular season					Postseason			
Team	Year	Games	Won	Lost	Win %	Finish	Won	Lost	Win %	Result
SLB	1913	11	5	6	.455	8th in AL	–	–	–	–
SLB	1914	153	71	82	.464	5th in AL	–	–	–	–
SLB	1915	154	63	91	.409	6th in AL	–	–	–	–
SLB total		318	139	179	.437		0	0	–	
STL	1919	137	54	83	.394	7th in NL	–	–	–	–
STL	1920	154	75	79	.487	5th in NL	–	–	–	–
STL	1921	153	87	66	.569	3rd in NL	–	–	–	–
STL	1922	154	85	69	.552	3rd in NL	–	–	–	–
STL	1923	153	79	74	.516	5th in NL	–	–	–	–
STL	1924	154	65	89	.422	6th in NL	–	–	–	–
STL	1925	38	13	25	.342	fired	–	–	–	–
STL total		943	458	485	.486		0	0	–	
Total		1,261	597	664	.473		0	0	–	

=== Record as general manager ===
Team	Year	Regular season					Postseason			
Team	Year	Games	Won	Lost	Win %	Finish	Won	Lost	Win %	Result
SLB	1913	153	57	96	.373	8th in AL	–	–	–	–
SLB	1914	153	71	82	.464	5th in AL	–	–	–	–
SLB	1915	154	63	91	.409	6th in AL	–	–	–	–
SLB	1916	154	79	75	.513	5th in AL	–	–	–	–
SLB total		614	270	344	.440		0	0	–	
STL	1917	152	82	70	.539	3rd in NL	–	–	–	–
STL	1918	127	51	74	.408	resigned	–	–	–	–
STL	1919	137	54	83	.394	7th in NL	–	–	–	–
STL	1920	154	75	79	.487	5th in NL	–	–	–	–
STL	1921	153	87	66	.569	3rd in NL	–	–	–	–
STL	1922	154	85	69	.552	3rd in NL	–	–	–	–
STL	1923	153	79	74	.516	5th in NL	–	–	–	–
STL	1924	154	65	89	.422	6th in NL	–	–	–	–
STL	1925	153	77	76	.503	4th in NL	–	–	–	–
STL	1926	154	89	65	.578	1st in NL	4	3	.571	Won World Series (NYY)
STL	1927	153	92	61	.601	2nd in NL	–	–	–	–
STL	1928	154	95	59	.617	1st in NL	0	4	.000	Lost World Series (NYY)
STL	1929	154	78	74	.513	4th in NL	–	–	–	–
STL	1930	154	92	62	.597	1st in NL	2	4	.333	Lost World Series (PHA)
STL	1931	154	101	53	.656	1st in NL	4	3	.571	Won World Series (PHA)
STL	1932	154	72	82	.468	6th in NL	–	–	–	–
STL	1933	154	82	71	.536	5th in NL	–	–	–	–
STL	1934	154	95	58	.621	1st in NL	4	3	.571	Won World Series (DET)
STL	1935	154	96	58	.623	2nd in NL	–	–	–	–
STL	1936	155	87	67	.565	2nd in NL	–	–	–	–
STL	1937	157	81	73	.526	4th in NL	–	–	–	–
STL	1938	156	71	80	.470	6th in NL	–	–	–	–
STL	1939	155	92	61	.601	2nd in NL	–	–	–	–
STL	1940	156	84	69	.549	3rd in NL	–	–	–	–
STL	1941	155	97	56	.634	2nd in NL	–	–	–	–
STL	1942	156	106	48	.688	1st in NL	4	1	.800	Won World Series (NYY)
STL total		3,966	2,165	1,777	.549		18	18	.500	
BKN	1943	153	81	72	.529	3rd in NL	–	–	–	–
BKN	1944	155	63	91	.409	7th in NL	–	–	–	–
BKN	1945	155	87	67	.565	3rd in NL	–	–	–	–
BKN	1946	157	96	60	.615	2nd in NL	–	–	–	–
BKN	1947	154	94	60	.610	1st in NL	3	4	.429	Lost World Series (NYY)
BKN	1948	154	84	70	.545	3rd in NL	–	–	–	–
BKN	1949	154	97	57	.630	1st in NL	1	4	.200	Lost World Series (NYY)
BKN	1950	154	89	65	.578	2nd in NL	–	–	–	–
BKN total		1,236	691	542	.560		4	8	.333	
PIT	1951	154	64	90	.416	7th in NL	–	–	–	–
PIT	1952	154	42	112	.273	8th in NL	–	–	–	–
PIT	1953	154	50	104	.325	8th in NL	–	–	–	–
PIT	1954	154	53	101	.344	8th in NL	–	–	–	–
PIT	1955	154	60	94	.390	8th in NL	–	–	–	–
PIT total		770	269	501	.349		–	–	–	–
Total		6,586	3,395	3,164	.518		22	26	.458	

== Head coaching record ==
=== College football ===
Year	Team	Overall	Conference	Standing	Bowl/playoffs
Allegheny Gators (Independent) (1904–1905)
1904	Allegheny	5–5			
1905	Allegheny	3–8			
Allegheny:		8–13			
Ohio Wesleyan (Ohio Athletic Conference) (1906–1908)
1906	Ohio Wesleyan	3–3–3	1–1–2	T–2nd	
1907	Ohio Wesleyan	7–3	2–3	6th	
1908	Ohio Wesleyan	4–4	2–3	T–6th	
Ohio Wesleyan:		14–10–3	5–7–2		
Total:		22–23–3			

== See also ==
- List of Major League Baseball player–managers
- List of St. Louis Cardinals owners and executives
- List of Los Angeles Dodgers owners and executives
- List of Pittsburgh Pirates owners and executives
