= Edwards Gymnasium and Pfeiffer Natatorium =

Edwards Gymnasium
- Edwards Gym
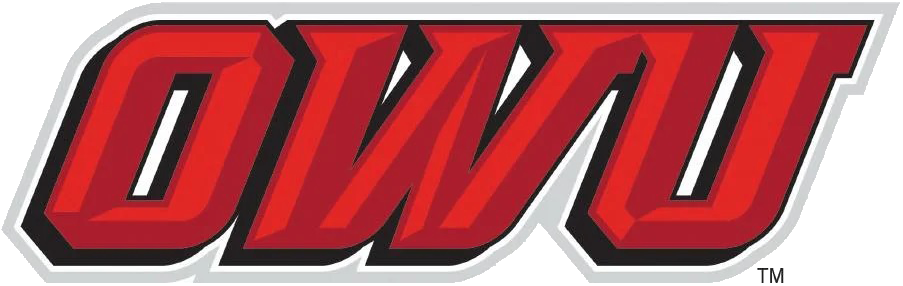

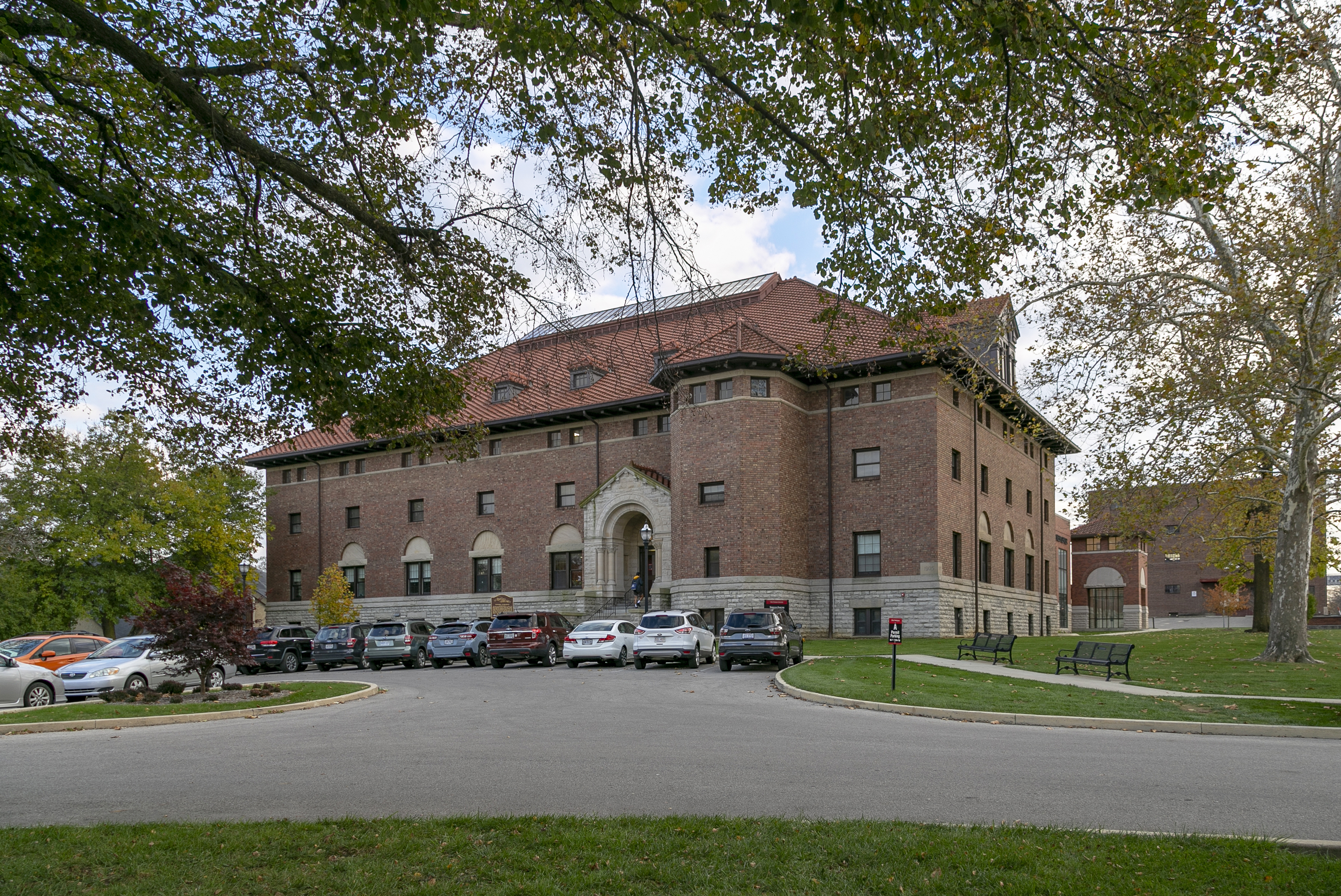
- Exterior view of the building in 2021
- Interactive map of Edwards Gymnasium
- Address: 105 S. Sandusky St; Delaware, Ohio; United States
- Coordinates: 40°17′41″N 83°4′3″W
- Owner: Ohio Wesleyan University
- Capacity: 1,800
- Type: Sports venue
- Surface: Recaflex track surface

Construction
- Opened: 1906; 120 years ago
- Renovated: 2012, 2015
- Architect: J.W. Yost
- Builders: Feick & Son

Tenants
- OWU Battling Bishops (NCAA) teams: men's and women's swimming; women's handball

Website
- owu.edu/student-life/fitness-recreation/fitness-facilities/edwards-gymnasium
- Edwards Gymnasium and Pfeiffer Natatorium
- U.S. National Register of Historic Places
- Area: less than one acre
- Built: 1905-06
- MPS: Ohio Wesleyan University TR
- NRHP reference No.: 85000632
- Added to NRHP: March 18, 1985

The Edwards Gymnasium and Pfeiffer Natatorium is a building on the main campus of Ohio Wesleyan University. Inaugurated in 1906, it was designed by architect J.W. Yost and was built by Feick & Son. Edwards Hall is a 1,800-seat multi-purpose arena. Located at the south end of the campus in Delaware, Ohio, it was home to the OWU Battling Bishops men's and women's swimming and women's handball teams.

== Overview ==
It has a stone entry portico and a "dominant" red tile roof with dormers. The gymnasium is named for alumnus John Edwards of Leipsic, Ohio, who served on the board of trustees of the university and was a major benefactor to the university.

In 1985, it was added to the National Register of Historic Places along with the natatorium named for benefactor Annie Merner Pfeiffer.

The Pfeiffer Natatorium was the competition pool for OWU from 1954 to 2010.

Basketball and volleyball competition, and other indoor sports, were moved to the 2,300 seat Branch Rickey Arena, built adjacent to Edwards Gymnasium, upon its completion in 1976.

The Edwards Gymnasium was then renovated to accommodate the Pfeiffer Natatorium, named for donor Annie Merner Pfeiffer.

It is 150 by 83 feet (46 m × 25 m) in plan. Built mainly of light-colored brick, it has a hipped red clay-tiled roof with dormers at both ends and sides.

The entrance has carved stone pillars. (Note: The National Park Service and NARA have misspelled "Pfeiffer" as "Pfieffer", as here.)

The complex was listed on the National Register as part of a 1984 study of historic resources on the OWU campus.

All the OWU sites listed together on the National Register in 1985 are:

- Austin Hall, W. Central Ave. and Elizabeth St.
- Edwards Gymnasium and Pfieffer Natatorium, Main Campus, S. Sandusky St.
- Ohio Wesleyan University Student Observatory, W. William St.
- Sanborn Hall, W. Campus
- Selby Field, Henry St.
- Slocum Hall, Main Campus, Sandusky St.
- Stuyvesant Hall, W. William St., and
- University Hall-Gray's Chapel, W. William St.

== See also ==
- List of Ohio Wesleyan University buildings
- National Register of Historic Places listings in Delaware County, Ohio
