= Mr. Rickey Calls a Meeting =

Mr. Rickey Calls a Meeting is a play written by Edward Schmidt in 1989. The play had its debut at the Ironbound Theater in Newark, New Jersey. The play debuted on the West Coast, in 1992, at the Old Globe Theatre in San Diego, California. It was last revived at the Lookingglass Theatre Company in Chicago, Illinois, with J. Nicole Brooks as director, as part of the 2011–12 season. The revival was nominated for three 2012 Equity Joseph Jefferson Award (Jeff Award) for Play Production (Large), Direction, and Ensemble.

== Storyline ==
The play begins with a 64-year-old retired African American bellhop, Clancy Hope, reminiscing about a meeting he witnessed in 1947, when he was 17 years old. The play then flashes back to that earlier time.

The majority of the action is set in a New York hotel room in the spring of 1947, and the action spans a couple of hours. Branch Rickey, the owner of the Brooklyn Dodgers, has called a meeting with four prominent African Americans to discuss breaking the color barrier in MLB. The invitees were Jackie Robinson, boxer Joe Louis, singer and actor Paul Robeson, and Bill Robinson, famed for his persona as the tap-dancing "Bojangles".

The play's characters - except for Hope - are all real historical figures, but such a meeting never actually took place.

The central narrative is that Rickey has decided to invite Jackie Robinson to join the Brooklyn Dodgers (Robinson, at this point in time, is already on the Montreal minor league team) and wants the invitees' support to help him address the controversy he knows will ensue. The invitees, especially Robeson, are suspicious of Rickey's motives, wondering if he is more motivated by profit than altruism. Robeson and Robinson are also concerned about the inevitable death of black-owned black baseball teams that they know will not be able to compete with MLB, fearing that without teams of their own, black players will be at the mercy of white owners and fans who do not respect them.

The invitees, except Robinson, are in the midst of personal conflicts, such as career declines, that add to the drama. Finally, Joe Louis, who has had a passive role throughout the play, breaks the impasse with a surprising move.

=== Characters ===
- Clancy Hope, elder - A retired bellhop at the Hotel Roosevelt in midtown Manhattan, New York
- Clancy Hope, younger - A bellhop at the Hotel Roosevelt in midtown Manhattan, New York
- Branch Rickey - The President and General Manager of the Brooklyn Dodgers and an advocate of breaking the "color line" in professional sports
- Jackie Robinson - Infielder for the Montreal Royals, selected as the first African American to integrate Major League Baseball
- Joe Louis - 1946 World Heavyweight Boxing Champion
- Paul Robeson - Renowned artist, singer, actor, political activist
- Bill "Bojangles" Robinson - Called the "King of Tap Dance", a famous entertainer and part owner of a baseball team in the Negro leagues

== See also ==
- One Night in Miami
- Robeson and Jackson
