= One Night in Miami (play) =

Play written by Kemp Powers

One Night in Miami is the debut play written by Kemp Powers, first performed in 2013. It is a fictional account of the real night of 25 February 1964. It pinpoints a pivotal moment in the lives of four, still nascent, Black American icons whose potential, thoughts and actions play out in the 90-minute, one-act play. The four characters are 22-year-old, newly crowned world boxing champion Cassius Clay as he transforms into Muhammad Ali, iconic Nation of Islam leader Malcolm X, influential singer-songwriter and record producer Sam Cooke, and star NFL running back Jim Brown. The men, friends in real life, celebrate Clay's surprise title win over Sonny Liston at the Hampton House in Miami, watched over by Nation of Islam security.

== Premiere ==
Kemp Powers won the Ted Schmitt Award for outstanding world premiere of a new play for One Night in Miami. The production took place in Los Angeles at Rogue Machine Theatre in June 2013, where Powers was a resident playwright. It also won three LA Drama Critics Circle Awards, four NAACP Theatre Awards (best playwright, best director, best ensemble cast, best producer) and LA Weekly Theater Awards for playwriting and direction.

The European premiere was at the Donmar Warehouse in London in October 2016. It was the first dramatic portrayal of the boxer Muhammad Ali after his death in June 2016 at age 74. Ali's family gave their blessing to the production. The production was nominated for the 2017 Laurence Olivier Awards for Best New Play.

=== Reception ===
The Hollywood Reporter described One Night in Miami as "a well-drafted and intricate sketch, with an uncommon feeling for shading. It gives fine actors good material to play in a congenially theatrical mode".

Variety wrote "It's easy to see why investors are eyeing this crackerjack world premiere. Any playwright can stick celebrity facsimiles together in a room; it takes real talent not only to render those portraits believable but also to invest the encounter with dramatic weight".

The Los Angeles Times wrote that "the pull of history and considerable topicality sells One Night in Miami at Rogue Machine. Although this well-appointed dramedy about what might have gone down in the Hampton House hotel the night that Cassius Clay became world heavyweight champion slightly overdoes the 20/20 hindsight, that doesn’t stop it from grabbing our imaginations".

The response to the European premiere praised both the outstanding individual performances and the committed ensemble playing

The Financial Times wrote about the play's depiction of a pivotal moment in black American history. The Evening Standard considered why it was more than just an Ali play.

Boxing commentators expressed admiration for the credible language of the play, pointing out in regard to Clay/Ali that the production "succeeds in portraying a thoroughly believable Ali. Actor Sope Dirisu bounds around the room with Ali's restless swagger. Writing lines for a man who came up with countless memorable quotes would be a tough ask for any playwright. Copy lines he used in other contexts and it risks sounding forced; come up with completely fresh ones and it risks sounding weak compared to the original. Kemp Powers pulls it off, capturing both the cockiness and the wit: "They had Joe Louis on one side of the ring, Rocky Marciano on the other. Halfway through the sixth, I saw them looking at each other, like they was asking themselves "why couldn’t we do that when we was young?"

=== London cast and crew ===
Cast

- David Ajala – Jim Brown
- François Battiste – Malcolm X
- Sope Dirisu – Cassius Clay
- Arinze Kene – Sam Cooke
- Dwane Walcott – Kareem
- Josh Williams – Jamaal

Crew

- Kwame Kwei-Armah – director
- Robert Jones – designer
- John Leonard – sound designer
- Brett Yount – fight director
- Duncan McLean – video designer

Director Kwame Kwei-Armah and the actors in the London run described the process and demands involved in creating performances which aim to credibly define the characters, friendship and lives of four black, controversial icons at a critical point in their lives and as a part of American history.

Sope Dirisu, who played Cassius Clay, said "people often sugar-coat Ali's life and find it convenient to forget the struggles of the time he lived through". All actors agreed when interviewed by the BBC that the play shouldn't be seen as a political tract. Dirisu also said Powers told the cast his play should feel like watching best friends in a room, "even in previews we've felt the audience picking up on that – I feel I'm on stage with my brothers. The energy is amazing."

David Ajala, who played Jim Brown, the NFL star, remembered something Powers said that really struck him, "Kemp said this was the play he would love to have seen as a 16-year-old – the black Avengers...a group of guys fighting for different causes but also for a common cause. And they're held in high regard and are iconic people. The simplicity of that and the excitement of it has really resonated with me: in that room we're all superheroes in our own way, in each other's company."

François Battiste, the only American actor in the European premiere, who played Malcolm X, said, "you don't have the ability to tell these stories unless you are actively pursuing the new writers. There are a whole lot of writers out there who need to be heard."

Arinze Kene, whose portrayal effectively included singing Sam Cooke songs, commented on increasing diversity, "the fact that the situation is getting better shows not how great things are now, but only that they used to be even worse. We've got a long way to go."

== Film adaptation ==
On 9 July 2019, it was announced that actress Regina King would direct a film adaptation, and it would be produced by Keith Calder and Jess Wu Calder for Snoot Entertainment and Jody Klein, ABKCO. It had its world premiere at the Venice Film Festival on 7 September 2020, the first film directed by an African-American woman to be selected in the festival's history. The film also screened at the Toronto International Film Festival on 11 September 2020. It was released in a limited release on 25 December 2020, followed by streaming on Prime Video on 15 January 2021.

== See also ==
- Mr. Rickey Calls a Meeting – play by Edward Schmidt
