= Jack Heidemann =

American baseball player (born 1949)

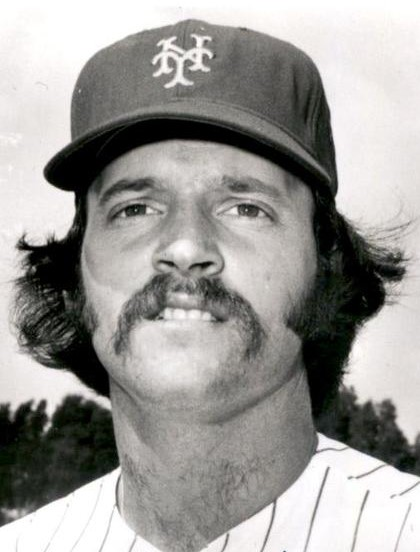
- Shortstop
- Born: July 11, 1949 (age 77); Brenham, Texas, U.S.
- Batted: Right Threw: Right

MLB debut
- May 2, 1969, for the Cleveland Indians

Last MLB appearance
- May 10, 1977, for the Milwaukee Brewers

MLB statistics
- Batting average: .211
- Home runs: 9
- Runs batted in: 75
- Stats at Baseball Reference

Teams
- Cleveland Indians (1969–1972, 1974); St. Louis Cardinals (1974); New York Mets (1975–1976); Milwaukee Brewers (1976–1977)

Jack Seale Heidemann (/ˈhaɪdəmən/ HYDE-ə-mən; born July 11, 1949) is an American former professional baseball player. He played in Major League Baseball as a shortstop between 1969 and 1977 for the Cleveland Indians, St. Louis Cardinals, New York Mets and Milwaukee Brewers. Heidemann was the first round draft choice by the Cleveland Indians in the 1967 Major League Baseball draft.

== Baseball career ==
Heidemann attended Brenham High School. Originally drafted 11th overall by the Indians in 1967, he made his debut on May 2, 1969 at the age of 19. The sixth youngest player that year in the Majors, he appeared in three games, collected three at-bats and hit .000 in that time.

In 1970, as the ninth youngest player in the league, Heidemann-at 6 ft 0 in (1.83 m) and 178 pounds-took the starting job at shortstop away from Larry Brown. As the team's starter, he hit only .211 with six home runs, although he did collect a hit in his first at-bat of the season. He was the only starting player not to hit 10 home runs for the 1970 Indians. Heidemann kept his job through the 1971 season, for the most part. In 81 games that year, he hit only .208 with no home runs and nine RBI. Heidemann was injured for some time during the 1971 season, suffering from a concussion and knee injury. He suffered the concussion on May 17, when Tommy McCraw hit a 140 (one source says 250) foot pop fly that should have been an out. Instead, Heidemann, Vada Pinson and John Lowenstein collided in the outfield, and McCraw actually got an inside-the-park home run.

Heidemann played in only 10 games in 1972, relinquishing his starting job to Frank Duffy. In those 10 games, he came to bat 20 times and hit only .150. Heidemann was traded, along with Ray Fosse, from the Indians to the Oakland Athletics for Dave Duncan and George Hendrick on March 24, 1973. He re-signed with the Indians prior to the 1974 season after spending all of 1973 in the minors.

1974 was Heidemann's best season, even though he hit only .247. He started the season with the Indians, but after collecting only one hit in his first 11 at-bats, he was traded to the Cardinals for Luis Alvarado and Ed Crosby on June 1. His average skyrocketed while with the Cardinals-he hit .271 with them in 47 games.

Heidemann was traded to the Mets, with Mike Vail, for Ted Martínez during the 1974/1975 offseason.

Heidemann spent most of 1975 on the bench, collecting 145 at-bats in 65 games. He hit .214 with one home run-his first since 1970-and 16 RBI. Heidemann started the 1976 season with the Mets, but hit only .083 in his first 12 at-bats, and was traded to the Brewers for minor leaguer Tom Deidel. With the Brewers that year, he hit .219 with two home runs. Overall, he hit .209 that year, collecting 10 RBI.

Heidemann finished his career in 1977, playing his final game on May 10 of that year. Used almost entirely as a defensive replacement/pinch runner in the five games he played that year, he collected no hits in one at-bat, although he did score a run.

Overall, Heidemann hit .211 in his career with nine home runs and 75 RBI. He was a .966 career fielder. Heidemann compares most statistically to Alvarado, and he spent five seasons with Dick Tidrow, John Lowenstein and Phil Hennigan-longer than any other teammates. He collected his final hit off Dave Roberts and his final home run off Bill Lee.

Heidemann is the uncle of Brett Bordes, a former minor league pitcher in the Baltimore Orioles organization. He is also related to Bordes' father, Charles Bordes – who played minor league baseball – and grandfather, Bill Cutler, who is the former president of the Pacific Coast League.
