= Denny McKnight =

American baseball executive and manager

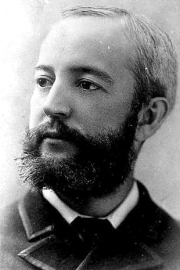
- McKnight in 1900
- Owner / Executive / Manager
- Born: April 29, 1848; Pittsburgh, Pennsylvania, U.S.
- Died: May 5, 1900 (aged 52); Pittsburgh, Pennsylvania, U.S.
- Batted: Unknown Threw: Unknown

Major-league statistics
- Managerial record: 4–8
- Winning %: .333

Teams
- As president: International Association (1877–1878); American Association (1881–1884); Pittsburgh Alleghenys (1882–1883); As owner: Pittsburgh Alleghenys (1882–1886); As manager: Pittsburgh Alleghenys (1884)

Career highlights and awards
- Founded the Pittsburgh Pirates

Harmar Denny McKnight (April 29, 1848 – May 5, 1900) was an American early baseball manager and executive. On October 15, 1881 he founded the Allegheny Base Ball Club of Pittsburgh in anticipation of playing in the new American Association. The club then became known as the Pittsburgh Alleghenys (now known as the Pittsburgh Pirates).

== Biography ==
=== Personal life ===
Denny was born in Pittsburgh, Pennsylvania. He was the son of Robert McKnight, a Republican congressional legislator representing Pennsylvania's 22nd congressional district. His brother Woodruff, was an early baseball catcher for the Enterprise Base Ball Club in Pittsburgh. Denny graduated from Lafayette College in 1869. He then became director of an iron manufacturing company in 1876.

=== Pittsburgh Allegheny and the International Association ===
McKnight's career in baseball began in 1876, when he and several local organizers formed the Allegheny Base Ball Club. The founding occurred just twenty days after Pittsburgh lost its bid to join the newly-formed National League. The club was named Pittsburgh Allegheny, a minor league baseball club which is unaffiliated with the modern day Pittsburgh Pirates. The team played their first game at Union Park on April 15, 1876, defeating the Xanthas 7-3, at Union Park.

In 1877, McKnight was named the manager of the Pittsburgh Allegheny as the club became one of the first minor league baseball clubs as member of the International Association for Professional Base Ball Players. He also later served as the International Association's president after Candy Cummings resigned from the post. The team and the league would however fold in 1878.

=== Founding of the American Association ===
On November 2, 1881, McKnight served as Allegheny's representative at the Gibson House in Cincinnati, Ohio during the founding meeting of the American Association. At the meeting, McKnight was made temporary chairman and Jimmy Williams was chosen temporary secretary of the Association. McKnight was the principal owner of the Pittsburgh Alleghenys in the American Association and even served as the club's manager at the beginning of their 1884 season. In 1884, Edmund C. Converse, of the National Tube Company, succeeded McKnight as president of the club, which remained in the American Association for the next five years.

=== Move to the National League ===
McKnight served as president of the American Association until he was ousted in 1886. His ouster was result of a controversy surrounding St. Louis Browns player Sam Barkley. In March 1886, Browns owner Chris von der Ahe offered Barkley for $1000 to Allegheny, the first team to pay the money. Billy Barnie, the manager of the Baltimore Orioles, was able to have Barkley sign an undated contract with his team and wired the $1000 asking price to Von der Ahe. However Von der Ahe had already secured a deal with McKnight, who was still the Alleghenys' owner. Barkley was convinced by Von der Ahe to play for the Allegheny club instead of Baltimore. However the Orioles appealed the decision by McKnight, who used his position as the president of American Association to decide where Barkley would play. It was later decided that the American Association would suspend and fine Barkley for signing with Allegheny. However McKnight refused Barkley's punishment and did not tell Barkley he would be suspended for the year. Barkley sued the Association, but they settled out of court with the suspension being lifted although the fine stayed in place. Baltimore was offered and accepted Milt Scott as payment. For his role in the controversy, McKnight was ousted as American Association president. This then led Allegheny president William A. Nimick to move the team from the American Association to the National League.

=== After baseball ===
McKnight left baseball in 1886. He worked for several years in New Mexico as a cattle company executive before returning to Pittsburgh and retiring from business. He died in Allegheny City on May 5, 1900, from what was termed "congestion of the brain".

== Notes ==
| Preceded by First | Pittsburgh Alleghenys Owner; 1881–1886 | Succeeded by William A. Nimick |
| Preceded by First | American Association President; 1882–1886 | Succeeded by Wheeler C. Wyckoff |
