= Paul Robeson congressional hearings =

Series of court hearings

The US congressional testimony by Jackie Robinson, the first African-American Major League Baseball player of the modern era, against the famous entertainer and international civil rights activist Paul Robeson, was an American Cold War incident. Its events were precipitated when, at an international student peace conference held in Paris on April 20, 1949, Robeson allegedly made a speech to the effect that African Americans would not support the United States in a war with the Soviet Union, due to continued second-class citizen status under United States law. This subsequent controversy caused the House Committee on Un-American Activities (HUAC) to investigate Robeson and Robinson, as a famed African-American baseball player, was called on to impugn Robeson.

== Robeson's advocacy for the Soviet Union ==
Paul Robeson's post World War II persecution by J. Edgar Hoover's FBI and the political right in the U.S. was, in part, due to his vocal support for the Soviet Union, which was a cause célèbre among well-known artists and scientists during the 1930s and 1940s. He had been particularly impressed by the absence of negative racial attitudes towards him during his visits to the Soviet Union. During the Cold War years the United States and the Soviet Union became fierce competitors as the two emerging superpowers. In the 1950s, McCarthyism and the Red Scare dominated the headlines, and many artists, scientists or academics with leftist affiliations who failed to denounce communism became unemployabled and blacklisted.

Robinson was reluctant to testify to HUAC on these matters, in part because of Robeson's prior advocacy on behalf of integration in professional baseball. Among other things, at the annual winter meeting of baseball owners in December 1943, Robeson became the first black man to address baseball owners on the subject of integration. At this meeting, he argued that baseball, as a national game, had an obligation to ensure segregation did not become a national pattern. The owners gave Robeson a round of applause and, after the meeting, Baseball Commissioner Kenesaw Mountain Landis remarked that there was no rule on the books denying blacks entry into the league. As such, Robeson had done much to pave the way for Jackie Robinson's entry into major league baseball, just over three years later.

== Statement to the House Committee on Un-American Activities ==
According to Jackie Robinson, in 1949 he struggled with his decision to testify against Robeson to HUAC. Technically, Robinson was not required to testify, but he believed there would be repercussions if he did not. In July 1949, Robinson eventually agreed to testify before HUAC, fearing that declining to do so might negatively and permanently damage not only his career but also the future integration of professional athletics. His testimony was a major media event, with Robinson's carefully worded statement appearing on the front page of The New York Times the following day. In the statement – prepared with the help of Branch Rickey, who in order to facilitate the testimony, released Robinson from a prior agreement not to make any political statements during his baseball career – Robinson said that Robeson "has a right to his personal views, and if he wants to sound silly when he expresses them in public, that is his business and not mine . . . . He's still a famous ex-athlete and a great singer and actor." Robinson also stated that "the fact that it is a Communist who denounces injustice in the courts, police brutality, and lynching when it happens doesn't change the truth of his charges," and that racial discrimination is not "a creation of Communist imagination." Robinson left the capital immediately after his testimony to avoid, as the black newspaper New Age pointed out, "being Jim Crowed by Washington's infamous lily-white hotels."

== Aftermath ==
In general, Robinson's testimony placated Americans worried about the threat of Communism, and reaction in the mainstream press was positive, including an article by Eleanor Roosevelt in which she wrote, "Mr. Robeson does his people great harm in trying to line them up on the Communist side of political picture. Jackie Robinson helped them greatly by his forthright statements." Reaction in the black press was mixed. The New York Amsterdam News was supportive, saying that "Jackie Robinson had batted 1,000 percent in this game," but the black newspaper Afro-American ran a disparaging cartoon depicting Jackie Robinson as a frightened little boy with a gun vainly attempting to "hunt" Robeson.

Much later, in 1963, after Robinson expressed disagreement with the political positions of the Nation of Islam, then-Nation of Islam minister Malcolm X commented harshly on Robinson's testimony concerning Robeson, citing the testimony as an example of Robinson's submissiveness to the white establishment. Nearly forty five years later, in the 1998 British Robeson documentary Speak of Me As I Am, Oscar Peterson Jr. recalled the Robinson-Robeson incident, stating "that it was very hurtful to see Jackie Robinson be made to attack Paul Robeson whom many of us loved so dearly."

=== Robinson and Robeson respond ===
While Robeson considered Robinson's testimony a "disservice" to the black community, he declined to comment on Robinson personally: "I am not going to permit the issue to boil down to a personal feud between me and Jackie. To do that, would be to do exactly what the other group wants us to do." Jackie Robinson appreciated Robeson's restraint, and eventually grew to have greater admiration for Robeson. Near the end of his life, Robinson wrote in his autobiography about the incident:

However, in those days I had much more faith in the ultimate justice of the American white man than I have today. I would reject such an invitation if offered now . . . . I have grown wiser and closer to the painful truths about America's destructiveness. And I do have increased respect for Paul Robeson who, over the span of twenty years, sacrificed himself, his career, and the wealth and comfort he once enjoyed because, I believe, he was sincerely trying to help his people.

=== Paul Robeson's 1956 HUAC testimony ===
In June 1956, Robeson was called before the House Un-American Activities Committee (HUAC) after he refused to sign an affidavit affirming that he was not a Communist. In response to questions concerning his alleged Communist Party membership, Robeson reminded the Committee that the Communist Party was a legal party and invited its members to join him in the voting booth before he invoked the Fifth Amendment and refused to respond. Robeson lambasted Committee members on civil rights issues concerning African-Americans. When one committee member asked him why he hadn't remained in the Soviet Union, he replied,

Because my father was a slave, and my people died to build this country, and I am going to stay here, and have a part of it just like you. And no Fascist-minded people will drive me from it. Is that clear? I am for peace with the Soviet Union, and I am for peace with China, and I am not for peace or friendship with the Fascist Franco, and I am not for peace with Fascist Nazi Germans. I am for peace with decent people.

When asked about Stalin's purges he stated that, "I have told you, mister, that I would not discuss anything with the people who have murdered sixty million of my people, and I will not discuss Stalin with you." And "I will discuss Stalin when I may be among the Russian people some day, singing for them, I will discuss it there. It is their problem." Asked if he had praised Stalin during his previous trip to the Soviet Union, Robeson replied, "I do not know." When asked outright if he had changed his mind about Stalin he implored,

Whatever has happened to Stalin, gentlemen, is a question for the Soviet Union, and I would not argue with a representative of the people who, in building America, wasted sixty to a hundred million lives of my people, black people drawn from Africa on the plantations. You are responsible, and your forebears, for sixty million to one hundred million black people dying in the slave ships and on the plantations, and don't ask me about anybody, please.
