= Littick Field =

Baseball field in Delaware, Ohio, US

Coordinates: 40.291544°N 83.06436°W

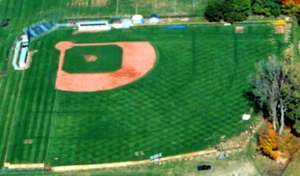

Littick Field, usually referred to simply as The Playground, is a baseball field at Ohio Wesleyan University in Delaware, Ohio, where the Battling Bishops' baseball team plays. The field—named after the Clay Littick, Class of 1915.

Littick Field is located just south of Selby Field and on the eastern side of the campus of Ohio Wesleyan University. The dimensions of the field from home plate to the outfield fence are 330 feet in left and right field, 385 feet in center field and 365 feet in left and right center gaps.
