= Branch Rickey Arena =

Arena in Delaware, Ohio

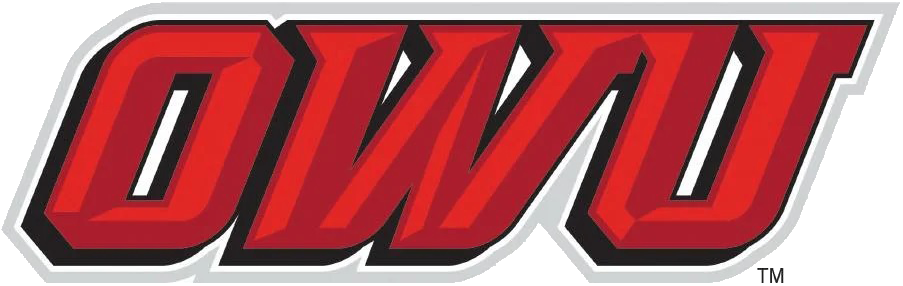

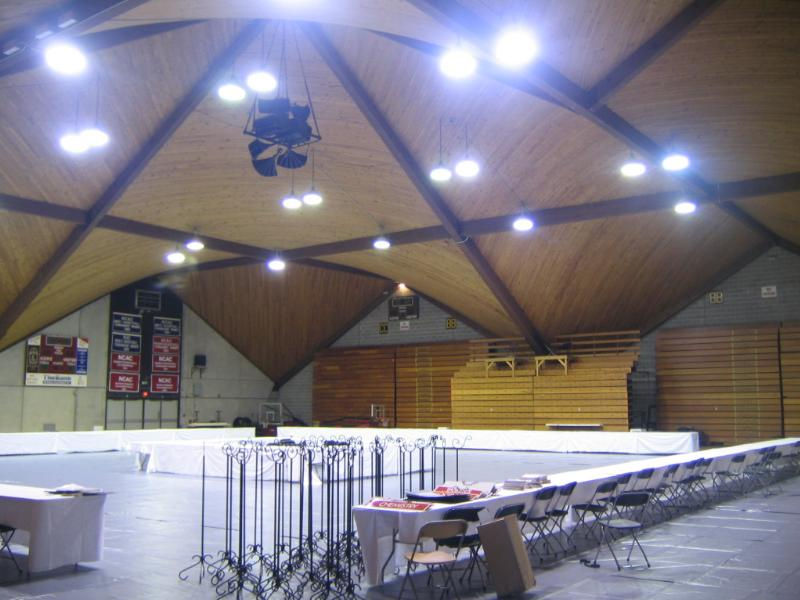
- Interior view of the arena, 2006
- Interactive map of Branch Rickey Arena
- Address: Delaware, OH; United States
- Coordinates: 40.294902°N 83.066339°W
- Owner: Ohio Wesleyan University
- Operator: OWU Athletics
- Capacity: 3,000
- Type: Arena
- Current use: Basketball; Volleyball

Construction
- Opened: 1976; 50 years ago

Tenants
- OWU Bishops (NCAA) teams: men's and women's basketball; women's volleyball

Website
- owu.edu/branch-rickey-arena/

Branch Rickey Arena is a 2,300-seat arena at Ohio Wesleyan University in Delaware, Ohio, located centrally on campus and adjacent to Edwards Gymnasium. It is home to the Ohio Wesleyan Battling Bishops men's and women's basketball and women's volleyball teams.

It opened in June 1976, replacing Edwards Gymnasium, which was remodeled to become a full-time exercise facility. It was named for the late Branch Rickey, class of 1904, a major benefactor to the university and a manager of the Brooklyn Dodgers. Rickey is often regarded as "the mentor to Jackie Robinson", the first African-American to play in Major League Baseball (MLB) in the modern era.
