= Thomas P. Johnson =

American lawyer and businessman

Thomas Phillips Johnson
- Born: June 8, 1914; New Castle, Pennsylvania, U.S.
- Died: May 23, 2000 (aged 85); Pittsburgh, U.S.
- Occupations: Attorney, businessman, philanthropist, sportsman
- Known for: Minority owner of the Pittsburgh Pirates of Major League Baseball

Thomas Phillips Johnson (June 8, 1914 – May 23, 2000) was an American attorney, businessman, philanthropist, Republican Party activist, and sportsman. He was probably best known for being a minority owner of the Pittsburgh Pirates Major League Baseball franchise from 1946 through 1984.

Born in New Castle, Pennsylvania, Johnson attended local primary schools and preparatory school in Washington, D.C. He graduated summa cum laude from Rollins College in 1934. Three years later he graduated magna cum laude from Harvard Law School, where he was an editor of the Harvard Law Review. He began practicing law in Pittsburgh in 1937. After he interrupted his legal career to serve in the United States Navy during World War II, at war's end he became a founder of the law firm of Kirkpatrick & Lockhart; by the time of Johnson's death, the firm (now K&L Gates) had become Pittsburgh's largest. During his career, he served as an officer or director of more than 50 companies, as well as on the Rollins College board of trustees.

In August 1946, Johnson joined a group headed by Indianapolis businessman Frank E. McKinney that purchased the Pirates' franchise from its longtime owners, the Barney Dreyfuss family. With McKinney initially holding 50 percent of the team's stock, Johnson acquired 15 percent interest. His fellow minority partners included entertainer Bing Crosby (15 percent) and Columbus, Ohio-based real estate magnate John W. Galbreath (20 percent). Four years later, in 1950, McKinney sold his controlling interest and Galbreath became majority owner. Johnson retained his share in the team until selling it to the Galbreath family in 1984 and, as a Pittsburgh resident and leading member of its business and legal circles, played a key role in ownership and management decisions through three Pirate World Series championship seasons (1960, 1971 and 1979). During his tenure as an owner, the Pirates moved from venerable Forbes Field to Three Rivers Stadium in 1970.

A committed Pirates' fan who attended 55 Opening Day games, Johnson remained passionate about baseball even after the sale and once again invested in the Pirates as part of a new ownership syndicate headed by Kevin McClatchy in 1996. He died in Pittsburgh from cancer-related respiratory failure at the age of 85 four years later, with his family trust maintaining a share in the baseball club.

== See also ==
- List of Pittsburgh Pirates owners and executives
