= Ohio Wesleyan Battling Bishops =

Varsity sport teams at Ohio Wesleyan University

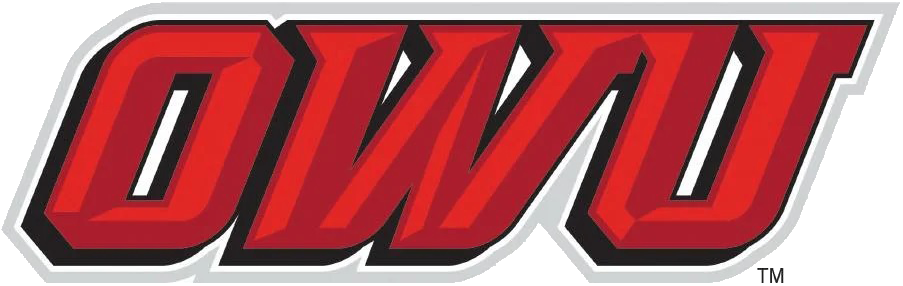
- University: Ohio Wesleyan University
- NCAA: Division III
- Conference: North Coast Athletic Conference
- Athletic director: Doug Zipp
- Location: Delaware, Ohio
- Varsity teams: 24 (12 men, 12 women)
- Football stadium: Selby Stadium
- Basketball arena: Branch Rickey Arena
- Baseball stadium: Littick Field
- Softball stadium: Margaret Sagan Field
- Soccer stadium: Jay Martin Soccer Complex
- Aquatics center: Meek Aquatics and Recreation Center
- Colors: Red and Black
- Fight song: Oh we're from dear old Wesleyan
- Website: battlingbishops.com

The Ohio Wesleyan Battling Bishops are the sports and other competitive teams at Ohio Wesleyan University. The men's and women's Bishops teams are NCAA Division III teams that compete in the North Coast Athletic Conference and the Mid-Atlantic Rowing Conference. The university sponsors 24 varsity sports, as well as several intramural and club teams.

== History ==
The first athletic teams of the college date back to 1875, the year of the first organized football team, although fifteen years passed before official colors were selected and the football team started playing its intercollegiate contest. That year the team played three games with Ohio State University, losing all three.

In 1902, the Ohio Wesleyan team joined Case Tech, Kenyon, Oberlin, Ohio State, and Western Reserve in forming the Ohio Athletic Conference (OAC). The first gym of the college, Edwards Gymnasium, was dedicated in February 1906. Ohio Wesleyan's first varsity men's basketball team played its games in the facility the same year.

The Ohio Wesleyan teams adopted their official nickname, the Battling Bishops, in 1925. During the same year, Ohio Wesleyan's official mascot became a grumpy-looking bishop dressed in a red robe.

Ohio Wesleyan's colors, red and black, date back to 1875, the year when the university organized its first official football game.

Ohio Wesleyan's lacrosse team has a historic rivalry with Denison University.

In 2011, Jay Martin became the all-time college soccer coaching wins leader en route to winning the national championship.

== Varsity sports ==
Men's sports	Women's sports
Baseball	Basketball
Basketball	Cross country
Cross country	Field hockey
Football	Golf
Golf	Lacrosse
Lacrosse	Soccer
Soccer	Softball
Swimming	Swimming
Tennis	Tennis
Track and field^{1}	Track and field^{1}
Wrestling	Volleyball
^{1} – includes both indoor and outdoor

== Facilities ==
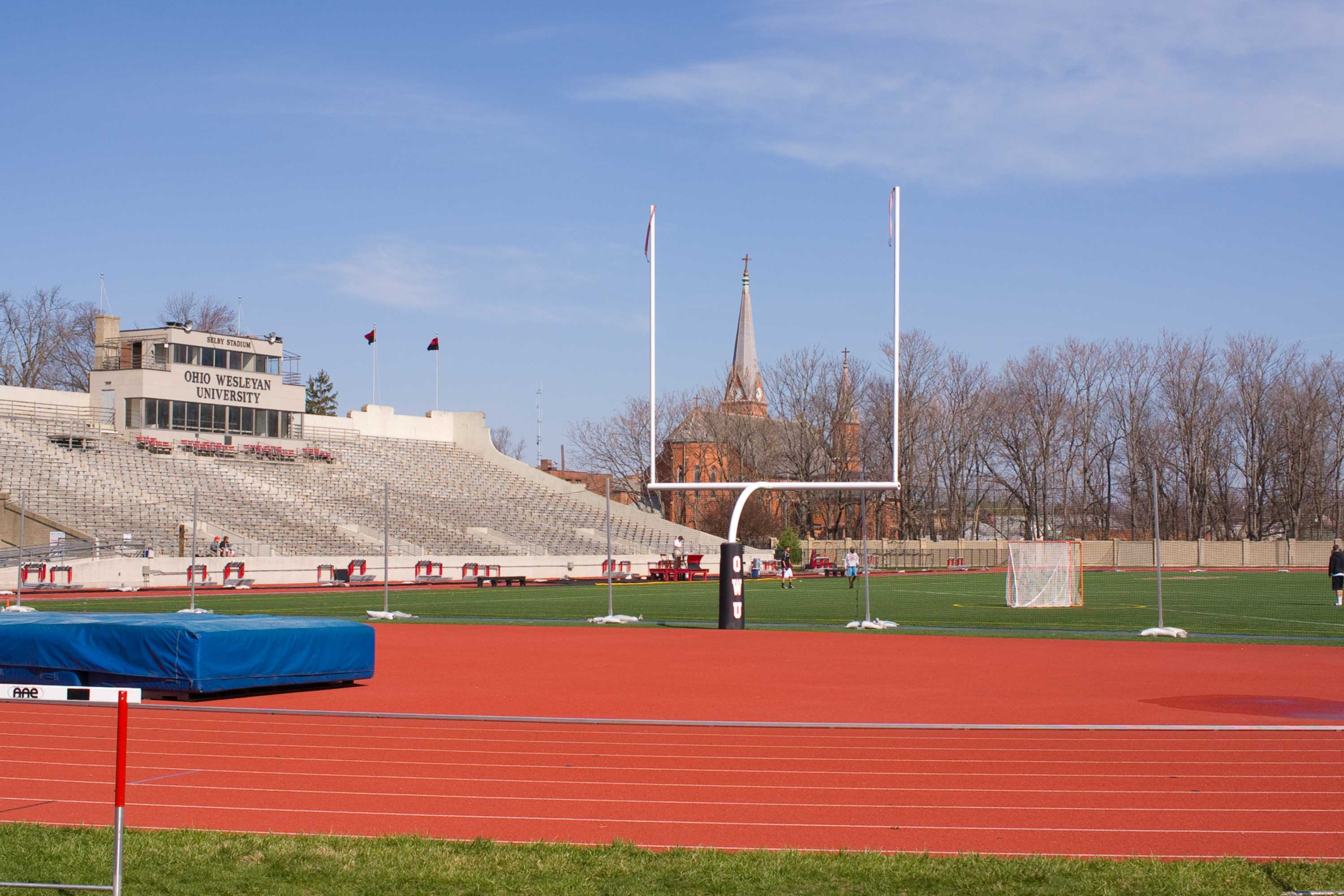
Selby Stadium

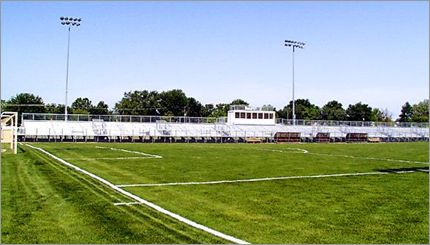
Jay Martin Soccer Complex

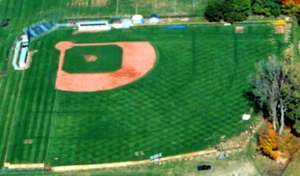
Littick Field

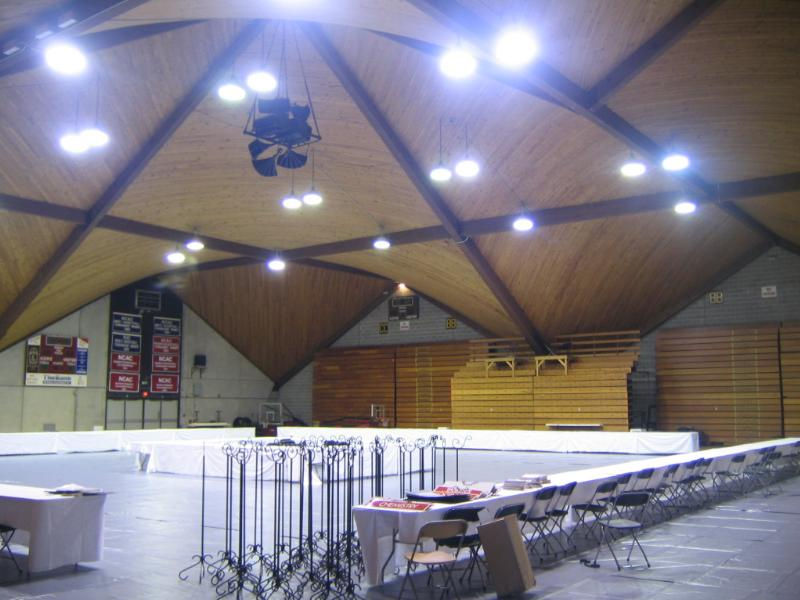
Branch Rickey Arena

Venue	Sport(s)	Ref.
Selby Stadium	Football	
Selby Stadium	Lacrosse	
Selby Stadium	Field hockey	
Selby Stadium	Track and field (outdoor) (Note: At George Gauthier Track, surrounding the field.)	
Littick Field	Baseball	
Branch Rickey Arena	Basketball	
Branch Rickey Arena	Volleyball	
Jay Martin Soccer Complex	Soccer	
Roy Rike Field	Soccer (Note: Former soccer facility.)	
Margaret Sagan Field	Softball	
Luttinger Family Center	Tennis	
Meek Aquatics and Recreation Center	Swimming	
Gordon Field House	Track and field (indoor)	

== Championship wins ==
- Men's Lacrosse
  - 4 Time NCAA Runner Up
  - 9 Time NCAA Final Four Participant
  - NCAC Champions: '87, '88, '89, '90, '91, '92, '93, '95, '96, '98 '00, '01, '03, '04, '05, '07, '10, '11, '13
  - NCAA Tournament Appearances: '75, '76, '77, '78, '79, '80, '81, '83, '85, '86 '87, '88, '89, '90, '91, '93, '95, '96, '97, '98 '99, '00, '03, '05, '06, '07, '08, '09, '10, '11 12, '13
- Men's Basketball
  - NCAA Division III 1988
- Men's Soccer
  - NCAA Division III 1998, 2011
- Women's Soccer
  - NCAA Division III 2001, 2002

== See also ==
- List of Ohio Wesleyan University people
