= Branch Barrett Rickey =

American baseball executive

Branch B. Rickey

17th President of the Pacific Coast League
- In office 1998–2020
- Preceded by: Bill Cutler
- Succeeded by: league disbanded

President of the American Association
- In office 1991–1997
- Preceded by: Randy Mobley
- Succeeded by: league disbanded

Personal details
- Born: Branch Barrett Rickey; November 1, 1945 (age 80)
- Education: Ohio Wesleyan University
- Awards: MiLB Warren Giles Award (1998, 2014)
- Employer: Pacific Coast League
- Website: MiLB Biography

Branch Barrett Rickey (born November 1, 1945) is a baseball executive who served as the 17th and final President of the Pacific Coast League (PCL), a Triple-A baseball league competing in Minor League Baseball (MiLB). He previously served as the President of the American Association from 1991 to 1997 before the league disbanded in conjunction with the 1998 Major League Baseball expansion and Triple-A realignment.

== Early life and career ==
Rickey is the grandson of Branch Rickey, who is best known for spearheading the movement within Major League Baseball to break the color barrier and for creating the framework for the modern minor league farm system. His father, Branch Rickey Jr., served as farm system director for both the Brooklyn Dodgers and Pittsburgh Pirates.

Rickey competed in high school football, wrestling, and baseball. He attended Ohio Wesleyan University, where he majored in philosophy. Like his father and grandfather before him, he played soccer all four years and was co-captain in his senior year. He is a member of Delta Tau Delta fraternity. He graduated in 1967.

He entered the Peace Corps in 1969 where he was assigned to Venezuela. He later worked as a college campus recruiter in the Southern United States and subsequently as regional recruitment director in 1971.

Also in 1969, Rickey began to pursue freestyle and Greco-Roman wrestling officiating. He was certified to judge and referee at the Olympic level, which he did at the 1972 Summer Olympics in Munich.

== Professional baseball ==
Rickey began his professional baseball career with the Pittsburgh Pirates organization in 1963 at age 17 when he became business manager of their Rookie League affiliate, the Kingsport Pirates of the Appalachian League, in Kingsport, Tennessee. He continued in this capacity during his summers through 1965. After college, he returned to professional baseball in 1972 as assistant director of the Kansas City Royals Baseball Academy in Sarasota, Florida. The Academy was a major league experiment to take teenage players with overall athletic skill and develop them into major league players. When the Academy was closed by the Royals in 1974, Rickey rejoined the Pirates. Rickey continued in Major League Baseball for over twenty years with Pittsburgh and the Cincinnati Reds as a scout, assistant scouting director during the 1970s, and director of player development in the 1980s.

In 1991, he succeeded Randy Mobley as president of the Triple-A American Association. He remained in this role until after the 1997 season when the league dissolved in conjunction with the 1998 Major League Baseball expansion and Triple-A realignment. Up to this point, three Triple-A leagues had operated in the United States: the American Association, International League, and Pacific Coast League. The directors of each league voted to disband the American Association and disperse its teams among the other two.

Rickey was elected President of the Pacific Coast League in 1998, replaced the retiring Bill Cutler, who served as PCL president from 1979 to 1997. That same year, he was selected as the recipient of MiLB's Warren Giles Award, which honors outstanding service as a league president. He was again honored with the Giles Award in 2014.
