= J. Palmer O'Neil =

American businessman and baseball executive

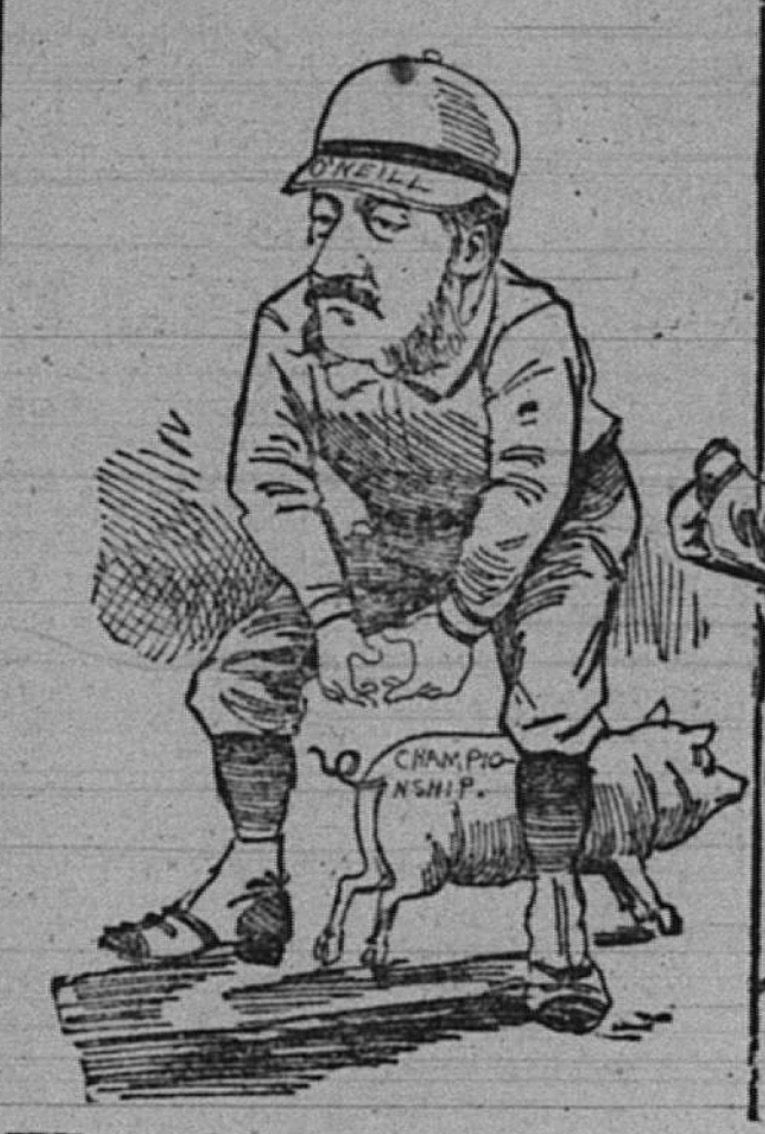
J. Palmer O'Neil as represented in a cartoon from the July 26, 1891 Pittsburg Press

James Palmer O'Neil (September 30, 1843 – January 6, 1908) was an American businessman and executive for the Pittsburgh Alleghenys baseball organization.

== Early life ==
O'Neil was born on September 30, 1843 in Ulster County, New York.

== Career ==
O'Neil worked for years as a life insurance executive in New York City and Pittsburgh, followed by a stint as a manufacturer of gun and hunting supplies.

He later took over as president of what would become the Pirates baseball organization. He is known for his work in helping to financially shepherd the team through the 1890 season, when the club set a league record for losses in a season while facing competition from the upstart Players League team, the Pittsburgh Burghers.

O'Neil died on January 6, 1908 (age 64 years), in Ben Avon, Pennsylvania, United States.
