= Bill Cutler (baseball executive) =

American baseball executive (1920–2012)

William S. Cutler (February 7, 1920 – March 24, 2012) was an American baseball executive who served as the Pacific Coast League president from 1979 to 1997. He was inducted into the Pacific Coast League Hall of Fame in 2005. He was born in Grand Rapids, Michigan.

Prior to serving as president of the PCL, Cutler worked in the American League office as an administrative assistant to Will Harridge. (In the famous video of Willie Mays' catch of Vic Wertz's fly ball in the 1954 World Series which then cuts back to fans in the stands, Cutler is seated next to the man who puts his hand to his forehead in disbelief.) He then worked as an assistant general manager and vice-president to Charlie Finley, although mostly in name only. After that, he worked as a scout for the Montreal Expos, and he eventually became owner of the Portland Beavers. He moved the team to Spokane, Washington, in 1973.

Cutler is related to former minor leaguers Charles Bordes and Brett Bordes and former big leaguer Jack Heidemann.

He died on March 24, 2012, in Mesa, Arizona.
