= Branch Rickey Jr. =

American baseball executive (1914–1961)

- Born: January 31, 1914; St. Louis, Missouri, US
- Died: April 10, 1961 (aged 47); Pittsburgh, Pennsylvania, US
- Occupation: Baseball executive
- Years active: 1935–1961

Wesley Branch Rickey Jr. (January 31, 1914 – April 10, 1961) was an American front office executive in Major League Baseball. The son of Baseball Hall of Fame club executive Branch Rickey, who among his many achievements invented the farm system and led the movement within Organized Baseball to break the color line, Branch Jr. — called "The Twig" by many — was a highly respected farm system director, but never headed his own organization. He was the father of Branch Barrett Rickey, widely known as "Branch Rickey III", a longtime baseball executive in the major and minor leagues.

== Career ==
Like his father, Rickey graduated from Ohio Wesleyan University and attended the University of Michigan School of Law. Branch Jr. entered baseball in 1935 as business manager of the Albany Travelers of the Class D Georgia–Florida League, one of the many farm clubs in his father's St. Louis Cardinals organization. In 1939, at the age of 25, he joined the archrival Brooklyn Dodgers as farm system director, recruited by the Dodgers' president, Larry MacPhail.

However, in a strange turn of events, when MacPhail resigned at the end of the 1942 season to rejoin the armed forces, he was replaced by Branch Sr., who in 1945 became a co-owner of the Brooklyn club. The younger Rickey then worked with his father as the Dodgers' farm director through 1946. During that time, on October 23, 1945, Branch Jr. was present at the historic signing of Jackie Robinson by the Dodgers' Montreal Royals affiliate as the first Black player in "Organized Baseball" since 1884. Representing his father and the Brooklyn franchise at the press conference in Montréal, Rickey told surprised reporters that the Dodgers "are not inviting trouble, but [we] won't avoid it if it comes."

From 1947 through the end of the 1950 season, the younger Rickey served as Brooklyn's assistant general manager, working directly under his father. But in late October 1950, Walter O'Malley acquired controlling interest in the team and forced Rickey Sr., his former partner, out of the Brooklyn front office.

In early November, Rickey Sr. joined the Pittsburgh Pirates as executive vice president and general manager, with Branch Jr. accompanying him as the Pirates' vice president and farm system director. The younger Rickey held that post until his death in Pittsburgh at age 47 on April 10, 1961. He had long been troubled by diabetes, and hepatitis and pneumonia were also factors in his passing.

Although the 1951–55 reign of Branch Sr. as GM of the Pirates was at the time viewed as a failure, he and Branch Jr. put into place the successful Pittsburgh organization, now headed by Joe L. Brown, of the 1960s and 1970s. Led by the great Roberto Clemente, drafted by the Rickeys from the Dodgers, the Bucs won the 1960 World Series and the 1971 World Series. Pittsburgh contended through the rest of that decade, winning its last Series in 1979.
