= William A. Nimick =

Major League Baseball owner

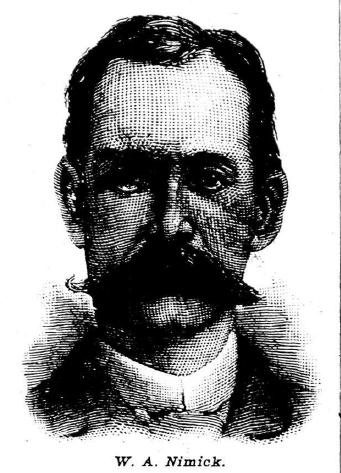
- Nimick in the May 19, 1888, edition of the National Police Gazette
- Born: September 2, 1848; Pittsburgh, Pennsylvania, U.S.
- Died: January 19, 1907 (aged 58); Pasadena, California, U.S.
- Occupations: Part-owner of the Pittsburgh Alleghenys/Pirates; President of the Pittsburgh Alleghenys (1885–1890)

William Albert Nimick (September 2, 1848 – January 19, 1907) was a part owner of the Pittsburgh professional baseball team in Major League Baseball, (Note: Some modern sources position Nimick as a majority owner of the team; however, contemporary sources indicate he owned a 25% interest in the team.) and was president of the team during the 1885–1890 seasons. Initially nicknamed the Alleghenys, the franchise has been known as the Pittsburgh Pirates since 1891. The team competed in the American Association from 1882 through 1886, and has been a member of the National League since 1887. A native of Pittsburgh, Nimick died in Pasadena, California, in 1907.

== Club ownership ==
Nimick was a shareholder in the Pittsburgh club as early as 1883. In December 1886, shortly after the club committed to play in the National League, The Sporting Life reported that the Pittsburgh club was "owned by Messrs. Nimick, Converse and Brown in equal shares". An 1888 Pittsburgh Press article names Nimick as one of four equal-part owners of the club. Just prior to the 1891 season, after the consolidation of Pittsburgh's National League and Players' League clubs, the Press reported that Nimick held a one-fourth interest in the reorganized National League team. Nimick sold his shares of the franchise to William Chase Temple following the 1891 season.

== Personal life ==
Nimick graduated from Chester Military Academy (now Widener University) in 1865 and was briefly an officer in the United States Army at the end of the Civil War. He was involved in various Pittsburgh businesses, was a bank director, and was the president of a publishing company. Nimick married in 1880; he and his wife had three daughters. He died in Pasadena, California, where he had moved for his health, in January 1907.
