= Edward Schmidt =

American dramatist

Ed Schmidt is an American playwright, known for "Mr. Rickey Calls a Meeting," (1989), "Cost of Living," (1997) and "My Last Play" (2012).

His most successful play to date, Mr. Rickey Calls a Meeting has been performed in numerous theaters around the country. It was last revived at the Lookingglass Theatre Company in Chicago, Illinois, with J. Nicole Brooks as director, as part of the 2011-12 season. It was nominated for a 2012 Equity Joseph Jefferson Award for Play Production.

- "Mr. Rickey Calls a Meeting" (1989)
- "Cost of Living" (1997)
- "The Last Supper" (2003)
- "My Last Play" (2012) A documentary of the same title shot throughout the long run of the play was also released the same year.
- "Our Last Game" (2015)
