= List of U.S. college men's soccer career coaching wins leaders =

This is a list of U.S. college men's soccer career coaching wins leaders. It is limited to coaches with at least 400 wins.

Jay Martin of Ohio Wesleyan University is the all-time leader in wins, with a record of 774–169–84.

== College men's soccer coaches with 400 wins ==
=== Key ===
| * | Active coach |
| † | Inducted into United Soccer Coaches Hall of Fame |
| | 400+ wins at a Division I Institution. |

=== Coaches ===
Statistics are correct through November 6, 2025.

| Rank | Name | Years | Wins | Losses | Ties | Pct. | Teams |
|---|---|---|---|---|---|---|---|
| 1 | Jay Martin† | 47 | 774 | 169 | 84 | .795 | Ohio Wesleyan 1977–2024 |
| 2* | Tony Tocco | 55 | 750 | 247 | 93 | .731 | Rockhurst 1970–1973, 1975–present |
| 3 | Joe Bean† | 45 | 607 | 185 | 61 | .747 | Quinnipiac 1962–1964; Bridgeport 1965–68; Wheaton (IL) 1969–2006 |
| 4 | Cliff McCrath† | 49 | 597 | 233 | 95 | .697 | Wheaton (IL) 1958, Gordon 1960–66, Spring Arbor 1967–1969, Seattle Pacific 1970–2007 |
| 5 | Ron Butcher | 46 | 596 | 263 | 72 | .679 | Wisconsin–Platteville 1968–69, Keene State 1970–2013 |
| 6* | Paul McGinlay | 35 | 586 | 97 | 47 | .835 | Trinity (TX) 1991–present |
| 7 | Skip Roderick | 40 | 573 | 181 | 78 | .736 | Elizabethtown 1983–2023 |
| 8 | Horst Richardson† | 49 | 566 | 304 | 72 | .639 | Colorado College 1966–2014 |
| 9 | Dan Gilmore | 38 | 559 | 184 | 59 | .734 | Rowan 1976–2013 |
| 10 | Jerry Yeagley† | 31 | 543 | 101 | 46 | .820 | Indiana 1973–2003 |
| 11 | Stephen Negoesco† | 39 | 540 | 172 | 66 | .737 | San Francisco 1962–2000 |
| 12 | Mike Coven | 45 | 533 | 274 | 59 | .650 | Brandeis 1973–2016, Wheaton (MA) 2017 |
| 13 | Mark Berson | 44 | 522 | 266 | 76 | .648 | The Citadel 1977, South Carolina 1978–2020 |
| 14 | Jack Mackenzie† | 43 | 516 | 258 | 76 | .652 | Quincy 1969–2011 |
| 15 | Schellas Hyndman† | 37 | 511 | 171 | 58 | .730 | Eastern Illinois 1977–1983, SMU 1984–2007, Grand Canyon 2015–2020 |
| 16* | John Rootes | 37 | 509 | 152 | 56 | .749 | Southern New Hampshire 1988–1997, Clayton State 1998–2003, SCAD 2004–2007, Lynn 2008–present |
| 17 | Bud Lewis | 43 | 506 | 279 | 58 | .635 | Wilmington (OH) 1975–2017 |
| 18 | Michael Parker | 34 | 494 | 192 | 33 | .710 | Lock Haven 1976–1983, UNC Greensboro 1984–2009 |
| 19 | Bob Warming | 44 | 485 | 270 | 89 | .627 | Transylvania 1976, Berry 1977–81, Charlotte 1982–88, Creighton 1990–94, Old Dominion 1996, Saint Louis 1997–2000, Creighton 2001–2009, Penn State 2010–2017, Omaha 2018–2021 |
| 20 | Joe Clarke | 41 | 482 | 215 | 85 | .671 | Saint Louis 1983–96, Washington (MO) 1997–2023 |
| 21* | Jon Andersen | 39 | 480 | 208 | 98 | .673 | Babson 1986–present |
| 22 | Tom Martin | 38 | 478 | 199 | 68 | .687 | Trine 1977, West Virginia Wesleyan 1978–85, James Madison 1986–2014 |
| 23 | Chris Waterbury | 36 | 477 | 169 | 66 | .716 | New England College 1982, Lyndon State 1983–84, Plattsburgh State 1985–87, 1989–2017 |
| 24* | Sasho Cirovski | 35 | 475 | 190 | 81 | .691 | Hartford 1991–1992, Maryland 1993–present |
| 25* | Erick Baumann | 31 | 470 | 127 | 54 | .763 | Dominican (IL) 1995–present |
| 26 | Tony Ochrimenko | 38 | 468 | 248 | 56 | .642 | Kean 1976–2013 |
| 27* | David Masur | 39 | 467 | 212 | 117 | .660 | Montclair State 1987–1990, St. John's 1991–present |
| 28 | Frank Kohlenstein | 38 | 465 | 224 | 74 | .658 | USC Upstate 1980–1988, Charlotte 1989–1994, Colorado Mines 1998–2016, Central Arkansas 2021–2024 |
| 29 | Carl Hutter | 40 | 462 | 275 | 72 | .616 | Harris–Stowe 1983–1987, Missouri Valley 1988–1993, Lindenwood 1994–2022 |
| 30 | Ray Reid | 33 | 458 | 155 | 79 | .719 | Southern Connecticut 1989–1996, Connecticut 1997–2021 |
| 31 | John Rennie | 36 | 454 | 207 | 48 | .674 | Massachusetts Dartmouth 1972, Columbia 1973–78, Duke 1979–2007 |
| 32 | Ralph Lundy | 44 | 453 | 348 | 66 | .561 | Erskine 1976–1986, College of Charleston 1987–2019 |
| 33 | Bob Gray | 40 | 445 | 268 | 60 | .614 | Charleston Southern 1977, Alderson Broaddus 1978–91, Mobile 1992–94, Marshall 1995–2016 |
| 34* | Ralph Perez | 37 | 442 | 216 | 77 | .654 | Whittier 1974–1976, Cal State Fullerton 1977, Cal State Los Angeles 1978–1980, Santa Clara 1981–1985, Old Dominion 1990–1994, Redlands 2006–present |
| 35 | Bob Reasso | 36 | 441 | 220 | 80 | .649 | Nasson 1979–1980, Rutgers 1981–2009, Pfeiffer 2013–2016, Colby-Sawyer 2021 |
| 36 | Michael Russo | 36 | 438 | 116 | 60 | .762 | Williams 1979–2014 |
| 37 | Roy Gordon† | 41 | 432 | 253 | 53 | .621 | Maine–Farmington 1970–1976, Mary Washington 1977–2010 |
| 37* | Tony Martone | 44 | 432 | 323 | 70 | .566 | Merrimack 1982–present |
| 39 | Rob Russo | 39 | 431 | 243 | 58 | .628 | Miami (OH) 1981, Gannon 1982–1990, USC Upstate 1991–1994, Oneonta State 1995–1998, Denison 1999–2019 |
| 40 | Doug Mello | 36 | 430 | 251 | 46 | .623 | Aquinas 1978–1982, Siena Heights 1983–1988, Southwest (NM) 1989, Luther 1990–2007, Hendrix 2008–2013 |
| 40* | Pepe Fernandez | 37 | 430 | 198 | 57 | .669 | Maryville (TN) 1989–present |
| 42 | Rick Kilps | 34 | 429 | 174 | 50 | .695 | Aurora 1977–1983, Wisconsin–Parkside 1984–2010 |
| 43 | Jerry Sheska | 29 | 424 | 156 | 32 | .719 | East Stroudsburg 1982–2010 |
| 44 | Sonny Travis | 32 | 423 | 150 | 51 | .719 | Centre 1986–88, Virginia Wesleyan 1989–2006, Emory 2007–2016, Coe 2019 |
| 45 | Joe Morrone | 38 | 417 | 196 | 63 | .663 | Middlebury 1958–1967, Connecticut 1969–1996 |
| 45 | Helmut Werner | 43 | 417 | 242 | 66 | .621 | Randolph–Macon 1962–2004 |
| 47* | Lenny Armuth | 31 | 416 | 161 | 63 | .699 | Drew 1994–present |
| 48* | Mike Noonan | 37 | 415 | 206 | 89 | .647 | Wheaton (MA) 1989–1990, New Hampshire 1991–1994, Brown 1995–2009, Clemson 2010–present |
| 49 | Gerry DiBartolo | 34 | 412 | 180 | 60 | .678 | Salisbury 1982–2015 |
| 50 | Fred Schmalz | 33 | 403 | 196 | 56 | .658 | Wyoming 1969–70, Davis & Elkins 1972–78, Evansville 1979–2002 |
| 51 | Gavin Donaldson | 36 | 402 | 243 | 63 | .612 | Northland 1984–1988, West Virginia Wesleyan 1991–2021 |
| 52 | Al Albert† | 33 | 401 | 187 | 64 | .664 | William & Mary 1971–2003 |

== See also ==
- National Soccer Coaches Association of America
- List of college women's soccer career coaching wins leaders
