= Jay Martin (soccer coach) =

Soccer coach from the Ohio Wesleyan University

Jay Martin is the head soccer coach at Ohio Wesleyan University and is the career wins leader in college soccer.

Martin has won two NCAA Division III Men's Soccer Championships - one in 1998 and one in 2011. He has also won more than two dozen conference titles. En route to the 2011 title, he tied the record in the national semifinals and broke the record in winning the championship.

He has also served as athletic director and earlier in his career as lacrosse coach at Ohio Wesleyan.

Martin retired following the 2024 season. He remained at Ohio Wesleyan as a full professor in the department of health and human kinetics.
