= 1890 Pittsburgh Alleghenys season =

1890 Pittsburgh Alleghenys
- League: National League
- Ballpark: Recreation Park
- City: Allegheny, Pennsylvania
- Record: 23–113–2 (.169)
- League place: 8th
- Owner: William A. Nimick
- Manager: Guy Hecker (1st season)

The 1890 Pittsburgh Alleghenys season was the ninth season for the Pittsburgh Pirates franchise. The team finished eighth and last in the National League with a record of 23–113–2 (.169), 66.5 games behind the Brooklyn Bridegrooms.

As of 2025, this remains the worst single-season record in the history of the Pittsburgh Pirates franchise. The 1890 team also recorded the most losses and the second-fewest wins in a season (behind only the shortened 60-game 2020 season). Their -16.5 pitching wins above replacement and 56 adjusted ERA+ (Note: Minimum 20 games played.) represent the lowest marks for any team in a single season in MLB history.

This was the final season for the team with the name "Alleghenys," as the team changed its name to the Pittsburgh Pirates the next season, a name it has retained to the present day.

== Background ==
The Alleghenys' season essentially ended when most of its stars defected to the Pittsburgh Burghers of the Players' League. With a decimated roster, the Alleghenys made a poor showing. The 113 losses by the Alleghenys set a new major league record, breaking the old record of 111 set the previous year by the Louisville Colonels. That record would stand until 1899, when the Cleveland Spiders lost 134 games, the all-time record.

Poor crowd attendance meant that this team played 97 of its 136 games on the road, finishing with a road record of 9-88. (The 88 losses remained a record until 1899 and continues to be one that cannot be replicated under current MLB scheduling rules, which only allow a maximum of 81 road games.)

The team's .093 road winning percentage is the lowest in MLB history for a minimum of 60 games, for comparison the 1899 Spiders road winning percentage was .098. This would be the last time the Pittsburgh franchise reached the century mark in the loss column until 1917, when the team was known as the Pittsburgh Pirates.

== Regular season ==
=== Season standings ===
National League
Team	W	L	Pct.	GB	Home	Road
Brooklyn Bridegrooms	86	43	.667	—	58‍–‍16	28‍–‍27
Chicago Colts	83	53	.610	6½	48‍–‍24	35‍–‍29
Philadelphia Phillies	78	53	.595	9	54‍–‍21	24‍–‍32
Cincinnati Reds	77	55	.583	10½	50‍–‍23	27‍–‍32
Boston Beaneaters	76	57	.571	12	43‍–‍23	33‍–‍34
New York Giants	63	68	.481	24	37‍–‍27	26‍–‍41
Cleveland Spiders	44	88	.333	43½	30‍–‍37	14‍–‍51
Pittsburgh Alleghenys	23	113	.169	66½	14‍–‍25	9‍–‍88

=== Record vs. opponents ===
1890 National League record Sources:
Team	BSN	BRO	CHI	CIN	CLE	NYG	PHI	PIT
Boston	—	6–11	8–11	11–8	13–7	11–8–1	11–9	16–3
Brooklyn	11–6	—	11–9	9–7	17–3	10–8	10–8	18–2
Chicago	11–8	9–11	—	12–8–2	13–7	13–6	8–10–1	17–3
Cincinnati	8–11	7–9	8–12–2	—	13–4	14–6	11–9	16–4
Cleveland	7–13	3–17	7–13	4–13	—	6–12–2	5–14–1	12–6–1
New York	8–11–1	8–10	6–13	6–14	12–6–2	—	6–11	17–3–1
Philadelphia	9–11	8–10	10–8–1	9–11	14–5–1	11–6	—	17–2
Pittsburgh	3–16	2–18	3–17	4–16	6–12–1	3–17–1	2–17	—

=== Roster ===
1890 Pittsburgh Alleghenys
Roster
Pitchers: Dave Anderson; Kirtley Baker; Sumner Bowman; Pete Daniels; Bill Day; Duke Esper; Robert Gibson; Charlie Gray; Billy Gumbert; Fred Hayner; Henry Jones; Alfred Lawson; Bill Phillips; Crazy Schmit; Phenomenal Smith; Bill Sowders; George Ziegler	Catchers: Harry Decker; Bill Wilson; Infielders: Fred Clement; Sam Crane; Fred Dunlap; Harry H. Gilbert; John Gilbert; Jim Gray; Guy Hecker; Paul Hines; Sam LaRocque; Dad Lytle; Doggie Miller; Fred Roat; Ed Sales; Peek-A-Boo Veach; Henry Youngman	Outfielders: Tun Berger; Eddie Burke; John Coleman; Charlie Heard; Ducky Hemp; Mike Jordan; John Kelty; Frank McGinn; Fred Osborne; Phil Routcliffe; Billy Sunday; Fred Truax	Manager: Guy Hecker

== Player stats ==
=== Batting ===
==== Starters by position ====
Note: Pos = Position; G = Games played; AB = At bats; H = Hits; Avg. = Batting average; HR = Home runs; RBI = Runs batted in

Pos	Player	G	AB	H	Avg.	HR	RBI
C	Harry Decker	92	354	97	.274	5	38
1B	Guy Hecker	86	340	77	.226	0	38
2B	Sam LaRocque	111	434	105	.242	1	40
SS	Ed Sales	51	189	43	.228	1	23
3B	Doggie Miller	138	549	150	.273	4	66
OF	Tun Berger	104	391	104	.266	0	40
OF	John Kelty	59	207	49	.237	1	27
OF	Billy Sunday	86	358	92	.257	1	33

==== Other batters ====
Note: G = Games played; AB = At bats; H = Hits; Avg. = Batting average; HR = Home runs; RBI = Runs batted in

Player	G	AB	H	Avg.	HR	RBI
Bill Wilson	83	304	65	.214	0	21
Fred Roat	57	215	48	.223	2	17
Fred Osborne	41	168	40	.238	1	14
Mike Jordan	37	125	12	.096	0	6
Eddie Burke	31	124	26	.210	1	7
Paul Hines	31	121	22	.182	0	9
Sam Crane	22	82	16	.195	0	3
Ducky Hemp	21	81	19	.235	0	4
Fred Dunlap	17	64	11	.172	0	3
Dad Lytle	15	55	8	.145	0	0
Henry Youngman	13	47	6	.128	0	4
Peek-A-Boo Veach	8	30	9	.300	2	5
Robert M. Gibson	3	13	3	.231	0	1
John Coleman	3	11	2	.182	0	0
John Gilbert	2	8	0	.000	0	0
Harry H. Gilbert	2	8	2	.250	0	0
Phil Routcliffe	1	4	1	.250	0	1
Frank McGinn	1	4	0	.000	0	0
Jim Gray	1	3	0	.000	0	0
Fred Truax	1	3	1	.333	0	1
Fred Clement	1	1	0	.000	0	0

=== Pitching ===
==== Starting pitchers ====
Note: G = Games pitched; IP = Innings pitched; W = Wins; L = Losses; ERA = Earned run average; SO = Strikeouts

Player	G	IP	W	L	ERA	SO
Kirtley Baker	25	178.1	3	19	5.60	76
Guy Hecker	14	119.2	2	9	5.11	32
Dave Anderson	13	108.0	2	11	4.67	41
Bill Sowders	15	106.0	3	8	4.42	30
Crazy Schmit	11	83.1	1	9	5.83	35
Bill Phillips	10	82.0	1	9	7.57	25
Billy Gumbert	10	79.1	4	6	5.22	18
Sumner Bowman	9	70.2	2	5	6.62	22
Bill Day	6	50.0	0	6	5.22	10
Phenomenal Smith	5	44.0	1	3	3.07	15
Charlie Heard	6	44.0	0	6	8.39	13
Pete Daniels	4	28.0	1	2	7.07	8
Duke Esper	2	17.0	0	2	5.29	9
John Coleman	2	14.0	0	2	9.64	3
George Ziegler	1	6.0	0	1	10.50	1

==== Other pitchers ====
Note: G = Games pitched; IP = Innings pitched; W = Wins; L = Losses; ERA = Earned run average; SO = Strikeouts

Player	G	IP	W	L	ERA	SO
Fred Osborne	8	58.0	0	5	8.38	14
Henry Jones	5	31.0	2	1	3.48	13
Charlie Gray	5	31.0	1	4	7.55	10
Robert Murray Gibson	3	12.0	0	3	17.25	3
Alfred Lawson	2	10.0	0	2	9.00	2

==== Relief pitchers ====
Note: G = Games pitched; W = Wins; L = Losses; SV = Saves; ERA = Earned run average; SO = Strikeouts

Player	G	IP	W	L	ERA	SO
Fred Hayner	1	0	0	0	13.50	1
Billy Sunday	1	0	0	0	inf	0
