= Gumbert =

Gumbert is a surname. Notable people with the surname include:

- Ad Gumbert (1868–1925), American baseball player
- Billy Gumbert (1865–1946), American baseball player
- Ferdinand Gumbert (1818–1896), German composer, singing teacher, and music critic
- Harry Gumbert (1909–1995), American baseball player
- Johan Peter Gumbert (1936–2016), Dutch medievalist

== See also ==
- Gondelbert, saint
