= Kiner =

Kiner is a surname. Notable people with the surname include:

- Aline Kiner (1959–2019), French journalist and writer
- Corey Kiner (born 2002), American football player
- David Kiner, American politician
- Harold G. Kiner (1924–1944), United States Army soldier and Medal of Honor recipient
- Helen Kiner McCarthy (1884–1927), American painter
- Isiah Kiner-Falefa (born 1995), American baseball player
- Kevin Kiner (born 1958), American film and television composer
- Ralph Kiner (1922–2014), American baseball player
- Steve Kiner (1947–2025), American football player

== See also ==
- Kiner's Korner, American pre- and postgame baseball interview show hosted by Ralph Kiner on WOR-TV
- Kiner Music, American composing duo consisting of Kevin Kiner's children Deana and Sean Kiner
