= Charlie Gray (baseball) =

American baseball player (1864–1900)

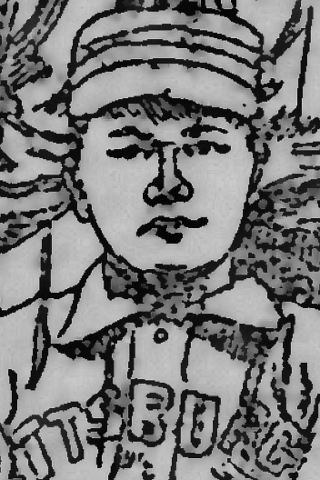
- Gray in Sporting Life, 1890
- Pitcher
- Born: June 1864; Indianapolis, Indiana, US
- Died: June 1, 1900 (aged 36); Indianapolis, Indiana, US
- Batted: Unknown Threw: Unknown

MLB debut
- April 23, 1890, for the Pittsburgh Alleghenys

Last MLB appearance
- June 23, 1890, for the Pittsburgh Alleghenys

MLB statistics
- Win–loss record: 1–4
- Earned run average: 7.55
- Strikeouts: 10

Teams
- Pittsburgh Alleghenys (1890)

Charles A. Gray (June 1864 – June 1, 1900) was an American baseball pitcher. He pitched five games in Major League Baseball, four of them as a starting pitcher.

== Early life ==
Gray was born in 1864 in Indianapolis. The first record of his playing organized baseball is in 1889 when he played for Danville of the Illinois–Indiana League. He also played for Youngstown of the Ohio State League in 1889.

== Career ==
On April 23, 1890, Gray made his debut in Major League Baseball as a relief pitcher for the Pittsburgh Alleghenys of the National League. He was the winning pitcher in that game and was described as "a freak" by the Sporting Life. He was billed as the team's pitcher "of six fingers and six toed fame."

Gray made his debut at a time when the rosters of major league teams were depleted due to the formation of the Players' League. After his debut as a relief pitcher, Gray appeared in four games as a starter. On May 24, 1890, Gray gave up 11 bases on balls and was charged with four wild pitches. He pitched a total of 31 innings, giving up 35 hits and 24 bases on balls and compiling a 1–4 win-loss record and a 7.55 earned run average (ERA). His .200 winning percentage was better than the club as a whole, as the 1890 Pittsburgh Alleghenys compiled a 23–113–2 record (.169 winning percentage).

Gray was released by the Alleghenys in early July 1890. He tried out with the New York Giants but did not make the club. He played the remainder of the 1890 season with Ottawa of the Illinois–Iowa League.

In 1895, he held an advertising job with The Sporting News. At the time, he cited being "known as the six-fingered pitcher" as his main claim to fame. He later worked as a bricklayer in Indianapolis. He died from pneumonia in 1900 in Indianapolis.
