= Harry H. Gilbert =

American baseball player (1868–1909)

Harry Gilbert
- Second baseman
- Born: July 7, 1868; Pottstown, Pennsylvania
- Died: December 23, 1909 (aged 41); Pottstown, Pennsylvania
- Batted: Unknown Threw: Unknown

MLB debut
- June 23, 1890, for the Pittsburgh Alleghenys

Last MLB appearance
- June 23, 1890, for the Pittsburgh Alleghenys

MLB statistics
- Games played: 2
- At bats: 8
- Hits: 2
- Stats at Baseball Reference

Teams
- Pittsburgh Alleghenys (1890)

Harry H. Gilbert (July 7, 1868 – December 23, 1909) was a Major League Baseball second baseman. He played in two games for the Pittsburgh Alleghenys of the National League on June 23, 1890. He started both ends of a doubleheader against the Philadelphia Phillies, collecting eight at bats with two hits. His brother, John Gilbert was his teammate with the Alleghenys. The Pittsburgh Alleghenies became the Pittsburgh Pirates.

== Sources ==
- Career statistics from Baseball Reference · Retrosheet · Baseball Almanac
