= Ed Sales =

American baseball player (1861–1912)

- Shortstop
- Born: 1861; Harrisburg, Pennsylvania, U.S.
- Died: August 10, 1912 (aged 50–51); New Haven, Connecticut, U.S.
- Batted: Left Threw: Right

MLB debut
- July 15, 1890, for the Pittsburgh Alleghenys

Last MLB appearance
- October 3, 1890, for the Pittsburgh Alleghenys

MLB statistics
- Games played: 51
- At bats: 189
- Hits: 43
- Stats at Baseball Reference

Teams
- Pittsburgh Alleghenys (1890)

Edward A. Sales (1861 – August 10, 1912) was an American Major League Baseball shortstop. He played for the Pittsburgh Alleghenys of the National League during the 1890 season.

Sales began his professional career with Chambersburg and Shippensburg in 1884. His overall minor league statistics were respectable, with a .287 batting average. During his time in the minors he was also a pitcher, with an earned run average of 2.72. After his season with the Pittsburgh Alleghenys, he continued to play minor league baseball in New York and Pennsylvania through the 1897 season.

== Sources ==
- Career statistics from Baseball Reference · Baseball Reference (Minors) · Retrosheet · Baseball Almanac
