= Mike Jordan (baseball, born 1863) =

American baseball player (1863–1940)

Michael Jordan
- Outfielder
- Born: February 17, 1863; Lawrence, Massachusetts, U.S.
- Died: September 25, 1940 (aged 77); Lawrence, Massachusetts, U.S.
- Batted: Unknown Threw: Unknown

MLB debut
- August 21, 1890, for the Pittsburgh Alleghenys

Last MLB appearance
- October 3, 1890, for the Pittsburgh Alleghenys

MLB statistics
- Games played: 37
- At bats: 125
- Hits: 12
- Stats at Baseball Reference

Teams
- Pittsburgh Alleghenys (1890)

Michael Henry Jordan (February 7, 1863 – September 25, 1940), nicknamed "Miltty", was an American professional baseball player who played outfield in the Major Leagues in 1890. He played for the Pittsburgh Alleghenys.
