= Bill Wilson (catcher) =

American baseball player (1867–1924)

- Catcher
- Born: October 28, 1867; Hannibal, Missouri
- Died: May 9, 1924 (aged 56); St. Paul, Minnesota
- Batted: Unknown Threw: Right

MLB debut
- April 30, 1890, for the Pittsburgh Alleghenys

Last MLB appearance
- June 7, 1898, for the Louisville Colonels

MLB statistics
- Batting average: .208
- Home runs: 2
- Runs batted in: 75
- Stats at Baseball Reference

Teams
- Pittsburgh Alleghenys (1890); Louisville Colonels (1897–98)

William G. Wilson (October 28, 1867 – May 9, 1924) was a professional baseball player. He played all or part of three seasons in Major League Baseball, primarily as a catcher. He played for the 1890 Pittsburgh Alleghenys and 1897–98 Louisville Colonels.

== Personal life ==
After retiring from baseball, Wilson became involved in petty crime, eventually being charged in 1909 with forging postal money orders. On May 9, 1924, Wilson's bloodied body was found in a St Paul, Minnesota ice-cream parlour by police after an anonymous phone call. He had been stabbed ten times. Police believed that Wilson had been murdered over a dispute regarding the distribution of illegal moneys from a crime.

== Sources ==
- Career statistics from Baseball Reference · Baseball Reference (Minors) · Retrosheet
