= Frank McGinn (baseball) =

American baseball player (1869–1897)

- Outfielder
- Born: 1869; Cincinnati
- Died: November 19, 1897 (aged 27–28); Cincinnati
- Batted: Unknown Threw: Unknown

MLB debut
- June 9, 1890, for the Pittsburgh Alleghenys

Last MLB appearance
- June 9, 1890, for the Pittsburgh Alleghenys

MLB statistics
- Games played: 1
- At bats: 4
- Hits: 0
- Stats at Baseball Reference

Teams
- Pittsburgh Alleghenys (1890)

Frank J. McGinn (1869 – November 19, 1897) was a Major League Baseball outfielder. He played for the Pittsburgh Alleghenys of the National League during the 1890 season.

== Sources ==
- Career statistics from Baseball Reference
