= Fred Roat =

American baseball player (1867–1913)

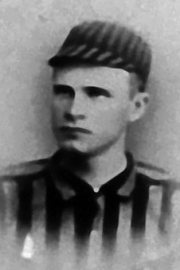
- Third baseman
- Born: November 10, 1867; Oregon, Illinois, U.S.
- Died: September 24, 1913 (aged 45); Oregon, Illinois, U.S.
- Batted: Unknown Threw: Right

MLB debut
- May 10, 1890, for the Pittsburgh Alleghenys

Last MLB appearance
- August 18, 1892, for the Chicago Colts

MLB statistics
- Games played: 65
- At bats: 246
- Hits: 54
- Batting average: .220
- Stats at Baseball Reference

Teams
- Pittsburgh Alleghenys (1890); Chicago Colts (1892)

Frederick R. Roat (November 10, 1867 – September 24, 1913) was an American Major League Baseball third baseman. His minor league career lasted as late as 1899 with two stops in the majors in 1890 and 1892.

== Sources ==
- Career statistics from Baseball Reference · Baseball Reference (Minors) · Retrosheet · Baseball Almanac
