= Fred Truax =

American baseball player (1868–1899)

Fred Traux
- Outfielder
- Born: 1868; Chicago
- Died: December 18, 1899 (aged 30–31); Omaha, Nebraska
- Batted: Unknown Threw: Unknown

MLB debut
- August 18, 1890, for the Pittsburgh Alleghenys

Last MLB appearance
- August 18, 1890, for the Pittsburgh Alleghenys

MLB statistics
- Games played: 1
- At bats: 3
- Hits: 1
- Stats at Baseball Reference

Teams
- Pittsburgh Alleghenys (1890)

Frederick W. Truax (1868 – December 18, 1899) was a Major League Baseball outfielder. He played for the Pittsburgh Alleghenys of the National League during the 1890 season.

== Sources ==
- Career statistics from Baseball Reference · Baseball Reference (Minors) · Retrosheet · Baseball Almanac
- Reichler, Joseph L. (1988). The Baseball Encyclopedia: The Complete and Official Record of Major League Baseball. Macmillan. p. 1542. ISBN 978-0-02-579030-8.
