= Bill Day (baseball) =

American baseball player (1867–1923)

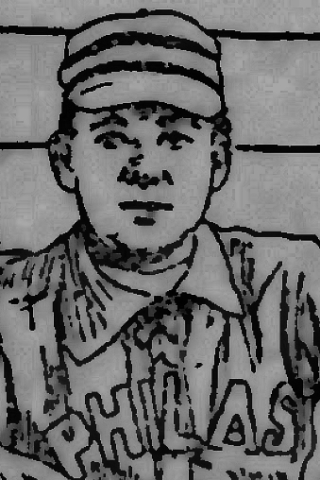
- Pitcher
- Born: July 28, 1867; Marcus Hook, Pennsylvania, U.S.
- Died: August 16, 1923 (aged 56); Wilmington, Delaware, U.S.
- Batted: Unknown Threw: Right

MLB debut
- August 20, 1889, for the Philadelphia Quakers

Last MLB appearance
- October 3, 1890, for the Pittsburgh Alleghenys

MLB statistics
- Win–loss record: 1–10
- Earned run average: 4.66
- Strikeouts: 39
- Stats at Baseball Reference

Teams
- Philadelphia Quakers/Phillies (1889–1890); Pittsburgh Alleghenys (1890)

William M. Day (July 28, 1867 – August 16, 1923) was an American Major League Baseball pitcher who played in 1889 and 1890 with the Philadelphia Quakers/Phillies and the Pittsburgh Alleghenys. He was still playing professionally in the minor leagues through 1904.
