= Pete Daniels =

Irish baseball player (1864–1928)

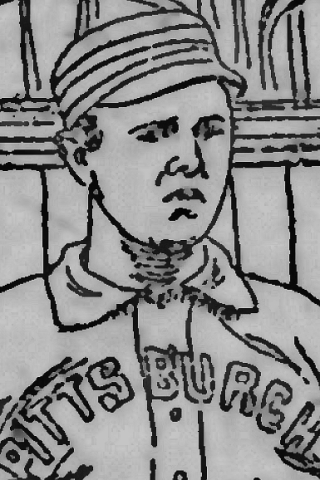
- Pitcher
- Born: April 8, 1864; County Cavan, Ireland
- Died: February 13, 1928 (aged 63); Indianapolis, Indiana, U.S.
- Batted: Left Threw: Left

MLB debut
- April 19, 1890, for the Pittsburgh Alleghenys

Last MLB appearance
- May 31, 1898, for the St. Louis Browns

MLB statistics
- Win–loss record: 2–8
- Earned run average: 4.79
- Strikeouts: 21
- Stats at Baseball Reference

Teams
- Pittsburgh Alleghenys (1890); St. Louis Browns (1898)

Peter J. Daniels (April 8, 1864 – February 13, 1928), nicknamed "Smiling Pete", was an Irish born professional baseball player who played pitcher in the Major Leagues from 1891 to 1898. He played for the Pittsburgh Alleghenys and St. Louis Browns.
