= John Gilbert (baseball) =

American baseball player (1864–1903)

- Shortstop
- Born: January 8, 1864; Pottstown, Pennsylvania, U.S.
- Died: November 12, 1903 (aged 39); Pottstown, Pennsylvania, U.S.
- Batted: Unknown Threw: Unknown

MLB debut
- June 23, 1890, for the Pittsburgh Alleghenys

Last MLB appearance
- June 23, 1890, for the Pittsburgh Alleghenys

MLB statistics
- Games played: 2
- At bats: 8
- Hits: 0
- Stats at Baseball Reference

Teams
- Pittsburgh Alleghenys (1890)

John G. Gilbert (January 8, 1864 – November 12, 1903) was an American Major League Baseball shortstop. He played in two games for the Pittsburgh Alleghenys, both on June 23, 1890. He started both ends of a doubleheader against the Philadelphia Phillies, collecting eight at bats without a hit. His brother Harry H. Gilbert was his teammate on that team. The Pittsburgh Alleghenies later became the Pittsburgh Pirates.

== Sources ==
- Career statistics from Baseball Reference · Baseball Reference (Minors) · Retrosheet · Baseball Almanac
