= Fred Hayner =

American baseball player (1871–1929)

- Pitcher
- Born: November 3, 1871; Janesville, Wisconsin
- Died: January 14, 1929 (aged 57); Lake Forest, Illinois
- Batted: Unknown Threw: Unknown

MLB debut
- August 19, 1890, for the Pittsburgh Alleghenys

Last MLB appearance
- August 19, 1890, for the Pittsburgh Alleghenys

MLB statistics
- Win–loss record: 0-0
- Earned run average: 13.50
- Strikeouts: 1
- Stats at Baseball Reference

Teams
- Pittsburgh Alleghenys (1890)

Fred Ames Hayner (November 3, 1871 – January 14, 1929) was a Major League Baseball pitcher who played in one game, on August 19, 1890 with the Pittsburgh Alleghenys of the National League. He pitched four innings in relief and allowed nine runs, six of which were earned. Hayner later became a sportswriter for the Chicago Daily News in Chicago and is credited (along with George Rice) with coining the name "Cubs" to refer to the team then known as the Chicago Colts, owing to their young age. The name was officially adopted in 1906.

Hayner also went to Lake Forest College and helped innovate the flying tackle in football.
