= Sumner Bowman =

American baseball player (1867–1954)

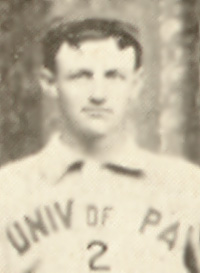
- Bowman with the University of Pennsylvania baseball team
- Pitcher
- Born: February 9, 1867; Millersburg, Pennsylvania
- Died: January 11, 1954 (aged 86); Millersburg, Pennsylvania
- Batted: Left Threw: Left

MLB debut
- June 11, 1890, for the Philadelphia Phillies

Last MLB appearance
- October 5, 1891, for the Philadelphia Athletics

MLB statistics
- Win–loss record: 4–10
- Earned run average: 5.22
- Strikeouts: 46
- Stats at Baseball Reference

Teams
- Philadelphia Phillies (1890); Pittsburgh Alleghenys (1890); Philadelphia Athletics (1891)

Sumner Sallade Bowman (February 9, 1867 – January 11, 1954) was an American professional baseball player in the early 1890s, who pitched for three teams during his two-year Major League Baseball career. In 1890 he played for the Philadelphia Phillies and later for the Pittsburgh Alleghenys, both of the National League. In 1891 he played for the Philadelphia Athletics of the American Association. His career statistics include a win–loss record of 4–10, an earned run average of 5.22, and 46 strikeouts in 146 2/3 innings pitched. Bowman died in his hometown of Millersburg, Pennsylvania at the age of 86, and is interred at Oakhill Cemetery.
