= Charlie Heard =

American baseball player (1872–1945)

- Pitcher/Outfielder
- Born: January 30, 1872; Philadelphia, Pennsylvania, U.S.
- Died: February 20, 1945 (aged 73); Philadelphia, Pennsylvania, U.S.
- Batted: Right Threw: Right

MLB debut
- July 14, 1890, for the Pittsburgh Alleghenys

Last MLB appearance
- August 30, 1890, for the Pittsburgh Alleghenys

MLB statistics
- Games played: 12
- Earned run average: 8.39
- Batting average: .186
- Stats at Baseball Reference

Teams
- Pittsburgh Alleghenys (1890)

Charles Heard (January 30, 1872 – February 20, 1945) was an American Major League Baseball pitcher and outfielder. He played for the Pittsburgh Alleghenys of the National League during the 1890 season.

== Sources ==
- Career statistics from Baseball Reference · Baseball Reference (Minors) · Retrosheet · Baseball Almanac
