= Dave Anderson (pitcher) =

American baseball player (1868–1897)

David Anderson
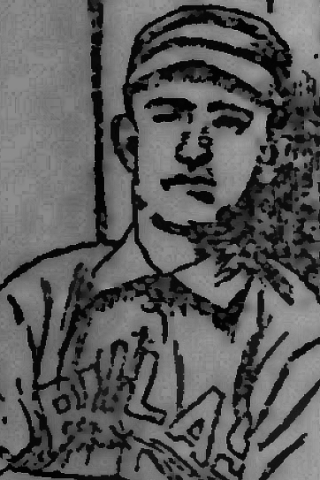
- Pitcher
- Born: October 10, 1868; Chester, Pennsylvania, U.S.
- Died: March 22, 1897 (aged 28); Chester, Pennsylvania, U.S.
- Batted: Unknown Threw: Left

MLB debut
- August 24, 1889, for the Philadelphia Quakers

Last MLB appearance
- September 29, 1889, for the Pittsburgh Alleghenys

MLB statistics
- Win–loss record: 3–13
- Earned run average: 5.45
- Strikeouts: 56
- Stats at Baseball Reference

Teams
- Philadelphia Quakers/Phillies (1889–1890); Pittsburgh Alleghenys (1890)

David S. Anderson (October 10, 1868 – March 22, 1897) was an American Major League Baseball pitcher who played in 1889 and 1890 with the Philadelphia Quakers/Phillies and the Pittsburgh Alleghenys. He died on March 22nd, 1897, in Chester, Pennsylvania. He was 28 years old.
