= Phil Routcliffe =

Canadian baseball player (1870–1918)

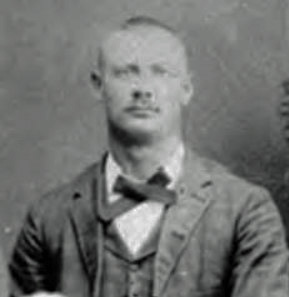
- Outfielder
- Born: October 24, 1870; Frontenac, Canada
- Died: October 4, 1918 (aged 47); Oswego, New York, U.S.
- Batted: Right Threw: Right

MLB debut
- April 21, 1890, for the Pittsburgh Alleghenys

Last MLB appearance
- April 21, 1890, for the Pittsburgh Alleghenys

MLB statistics
- Games played: 1
- At bats: 4
- Hits: 1
- Stats at Baseball Reference

Teams
- Pittsburgh Alleghenys (1890)

Philip John Routcliffe (October 24, 1870 – October 4, 1918) was a Canadian Major League Baseball outfielder. Nicknamed "Chicken", he played for the Pittsburgh Alleghenys of the National League during the 1890 season.

== Sources ==
- Career statistics from Baseball Reference · Baseball Reference (Minors) · Retrosheet · Baseball Almanac
