= Henry Jones (pitcher) =

American baseball player

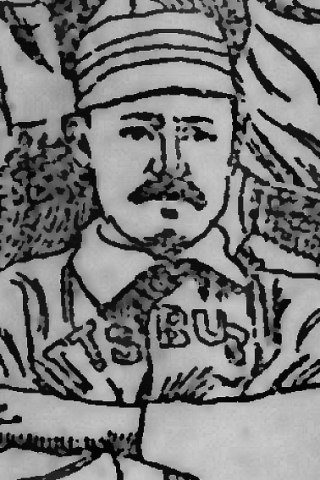
- Pitcher
- Born: Unknown; Pittsburgh, Pennsylvania, U.S.
- Died: Unknown
- Batted: Unknown Threw: Right

MLB debut
- April 22, 1890, for the Pittsburgh Alleghenys

Last MLB appearance
- May 31, 1890, for the Pittsburgh Alleghenys

MLB statistics
- Win–loss record: 2-1
- Earned run average: 3.48
- Strikeouts: 13
- Stats at Baseball Reference

Teams
- Pittsburgh Alleghenys (1890)

Henry Jones (? – ?), nicknamed Baldy Jones, was an American Major League Baseball pitcher who played in 1890 with the Pittsburgh Alleghenys of the National League.
