= John Kelty =

American baseball player (1871–1929)

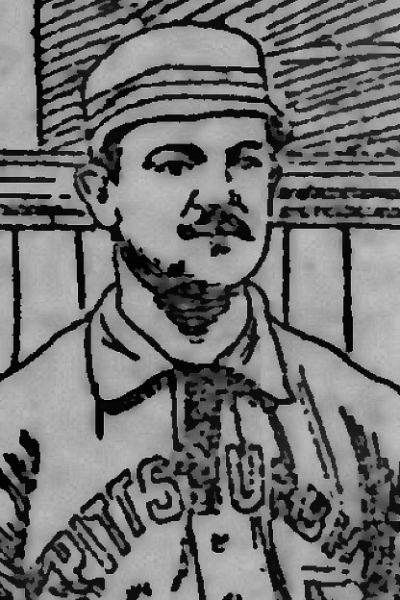
- Outfielder
- Born: March 10, 1871; Jersey City, New Jersey
- Died: April 13, 1929 (aged 58); Jersey City, New Jersey
- Batted: Unknown Threw: Unknown

MLB debut
- April 19, 1890, for the Pittsburgh Alleghenys

Last MLB appearance
- July 12, 1890, for the Pittsburgh Alleghenys

MLB statistics
- Games played: 59
- At bats: 207
- Hits: 49
- Stats at Baseball Reference

Teams
- Pittsburgh Alleghenys (1890)

John James Kelty (March 10, 1871 – April 13, 1929) was a Major League Baseball outfielder, specifically a left fielder. He played for the Pittsburgh Alleghenys of the National League during the 1890 season.

== Career statistics ==
He had a batting average of .237, an on-base percentage of .322, and a slugging percentage of .319. Kelty had a total of 27 runs batted in (RBI). He also had 10 stolen bases, to go with 24 runs, and a single home run. It is unknown whether he threw with his left or right hand, and which hands he hit with.

== Player Facts ==
Kelty, known by his teammates and fans as Chief, only played for a single season at the age of nineteen, playing a total of 59 games. Kelty weighed in at 175 lbs (79 kg), with the height of 5'10 (178 cm).

== Personal Information ==
Little is known of Kelty's personal life, except that he was born in Jersey City, New Jersey, on March 10, 1871, and that he died on April 13, 1929, at the age of 53. Kelty was buried in Holy Name Cemetery, located in his birth city.

== Sources ==
- Career statistics from Baseball Reference, or Baseball Reference (Minors)
