= Fred Clement =

American baseball player (1867–1930)

- Shortstop
- Born: May 21, 1867; Philadelphia, Pennsylvania, U.S.
- Died: December 25, 1930 (aged 63); Philadelphia, Pennsylvania, U.S.
- Batted: Unknown Threw: Unknown

MLB debut
- June 24, 1890, for the Pittsburgh Alleghenys

Last MLB appearance
- June 24, 1890, for the Pittsburgh Alleghenys
- Stats at Baseball Reference

Frederick G. Clement (May 21, 1867 – December 25, 1930) was an American Major League Baseball shortstop. He played in one game for the Pittsburgh Alleghenys of the National League on June 24, 1890. He was hitless in his one at-bat in the game and committed three errors in five chances at shortstop.

== Sources ==
- Career statistics from Baseball Reference · Baseball Reference (Minors) · Retrosheet · Baseball Almanac
