= Billy Gumbert =

American baseball player (1865–1946)

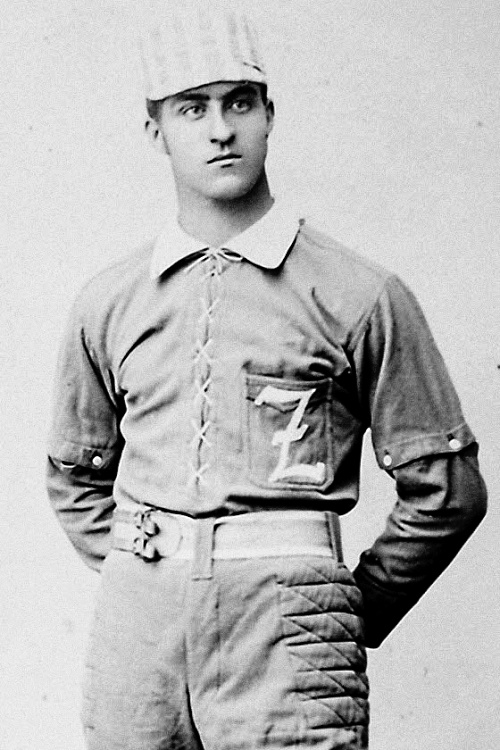
- Pitcher
- Born: August 8, 1865; Pittsburgh, Pennsylvania, U.S.
- Died: April 13, 1946 (aged 80); Pittsburgh, Pennsylvania, U.S.
- Batted: Right Threw: Right

MLB debut
- June 19, 1890, for the Pittsburgh Alleghenys

Last MLB appearance
- August 12, 1893, for the Louisville Colonels

MLB statistics
- Win–loss record: 7–8
- Earned run average: 4.06
- Strikeouts: 21
- Stats at Baseball Reference

Teams
- Pittsburgh Alleghenys/Pirates (1890, 1892); Louisville Colonels (1893)

Billy Gumbert (August 8, 1865 – April 13, 1946) was an American Major League Baseball pitcher in the 19th century.

== Biography ==
Gumbert was born William Skeen Gumbert in Pittsburgh, Pennsylvania on August 8, 1865. His brother, Ad Gumbert, and great nephew, Harry Gumbert, were also Major League Baseball pitchers.

He is recognized as the first pitcher in Major League baseball history (third MLB player overall) - and the first player in the then-newly christened National League - to hit a home run in their first at-bat, which he accomplished on June 19, 1890. It would be the only home run of his career.

He also played football as a lineman for the Pittsburgh Athletic Club.

== Death and interment ==
Billy Gumbert died in his home town of Pittsburgh and was buried in Homewood Cemetery.

== See also ==
- List of Major League Baseball players with a home run in their first major league at bat

== Sources ==
- Career statistics from Baseball Reference · Baseball Reference (Minors) · Retrosheet · Baseball Almanac
