= Tun Berger =

American baseball player (1867–1907)

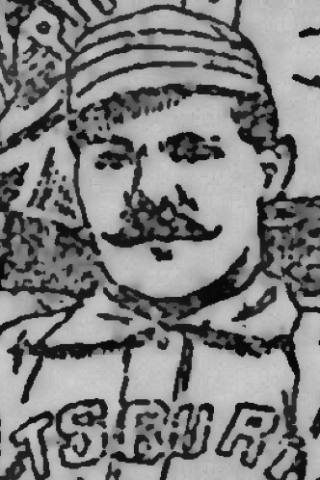
- Catcher
- Born: December 6, 1867; Pittsburgh, Pennsylvania, U.S.
- Died: June 10, 1907 (aged 39); Pittsburgh, Pennsylvania, U.S.
- Batted: unknown Threw: Right

MLB debut
- May 9, 1890, for the Pittsburgh Alleghenys

Last MLB appearance
- August 28, 1892, for the Washington Senators

MLB statistics
- Batting average: .241
- Home runs: 1
- Runs batted in: 57
- Stats at Baseball Reference

Teams
- Pittsburgh Alleghenys/Pirates (1890–91); Washington Senators (1892)

John Henry "Tun" Berger (December 6, 1867 – June 10, 1907) was an American Major League Baseball player. He played for the Pittsburgh Alleghenys/Pirates and Washington Senators. In his career, he hit one home run and had 57 RBI, 40 of which came in 1890 for the Alleghenys.
