= Ad Gumbert =

American baseball player (1867–1925)

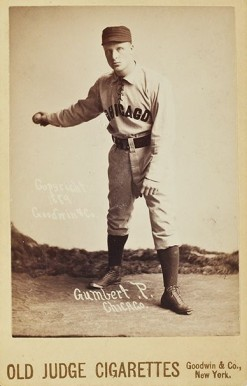
- Pitcher
- Born: October 10, 1868; Pittsburgh, Pennsylvania, U.S.
- Died: April 23, 1925 (aged 56); Pittsburgh, Pennsylvania, U.S.
- Batted: Right Threw: Right

MLB debut
- September 15, 1888, for the Chicago White Stockings

Last MLB appearance
- August 28, 1896, for the Philadelphia Phillies

MLB statistics
- Win–loss record: 123–102
- Earned run average: 4.27
- Strikeouts: 546
- Stats at Baseball Reference

Teams
- Chicago White Stockings (1888–1889); Boston Reds (1890); Chicago Colts (1891–1892); Pittsburgh Pirates (1893–1894); Brooklyn Grooms/Bridegrooms (1895–1896); Philadelphia Phillies (1896)

Addison Courtney Gumbert (October 10, 1867 – April 23, 1925) was an American pitcher for Major League Baseball in the 19th century. His brother Billy Gumbert and great nephew Harry Gumbert were also Major League Baseball players.

== Early life ==
Addison Gumbert was born on October 10, 1867, or 1868, in Pittsburgh, Pennsylvania, to Robert and Henrietta Gumbert. At the 1880 United States census, Robert worked as a dispatcher, while Henrietta was unemployed, with her occupation listed as a "keephouse". The family lived on Frankstown Avenue in the 21st Ward of Pittsburgh.

== Post-baseball career ==
After retiring from baseball, Gumbert had a career as a public official in Allegheny County and Pittsburgh. He was elected as Allegheny County sheriff in 1906 and as an Allegheny County commissioner in 1915. While sheriff in 1908, he was elected president of the Western Pennsylvania Hockey League.
