= Fred Osborne =

American baseball player (1865–1907)

- Shortstop
- Born: May 1865; North-Western Territory, British North America
- Died: August 31, 1907 (aged 42); Walla Walla, Washington, U.S.
- Batted: Left Threw: Left

MLB debut
- July 14, 1890, for the Pittsburgh Alleghenys

Last MLB appearance
- September 1, 1890, for the Pittsburgh Alleghenys

MLB statistics
- Batting average: .238
- Home runs: 1
- Runs batted in: 14
- Stats at Baseball Reference

Teams
- Pittsburgh Alleghenys (1890)

Frederick W. Osborne (May 1865 – August 31, 1907), nicknamed "Ossie", was a Major League Baseball pitcher and outfielder for the Pittsburgh Alleghenys.

Osborne was born in what would later become the Northwest Territories, in an area that was then a little organized part of the British Empire. He played only part of one season in the majors, 1890, in 41 games including 8 that he pitched in. He had a career batting average of .238, 1 home run, and 14 runs batted in. He also was 0–5 with an ERA of 8.38 with only 14 strikeouts compared to 45 walks as a pitcher.
