= Harry Gumbert =

American baseball player (1909–1995)

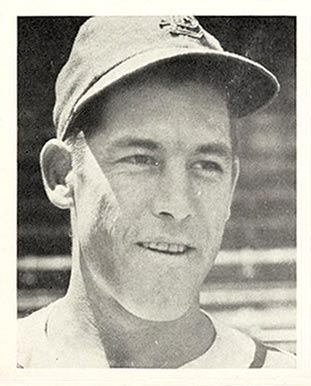
- Pitcher
- Born: November 5, 1909; Elizabeth, Pennsylvania, U.S.
- Died: January 4, 1995 (aged 85); Wimberley, Texas, U.S.
- Batted: Right Threw: Right

MLB debut
- September 12, 1935, for the New York Giants

Last MLB appearance
- April 29, 1950, for the Pittsburgh Pirates

MLB statistics
- Win–loss record: 143–113
- Earned run average: 3.68
- Strikeouts: 709
- Stats at Baseball Reference

Teams
- New York Giants (1935–1941); St. Louis Cardinals (1941–1944); Cincinnati Reds (1944, 1946–1949); Pittsburgh Pirates (1949–1950)

Career highlights and awards
- World Series champion (1942)

Harry Edwards Gumbert (November 5, 1909 – January 4, 1995), nicknamed "Gunboat", was an American pitcher in Major League Baseball whose career extended for 21 professional seasons, including 15 years and 508 games pitched in the big leagues. He threw right-handed and was listed at 6 feet 2 inches (1.88 m) tall and 185 pounds (84 kg). Gumbert was born in Elizabeth, Pennsylvania, and was the great-nephew of two 19th-century major league players, Ad and Billy Gumbert.

== Pitching career ==
Gumbert's career began in 1930 in minor league baseball, and after winning 19 games for the International League edition of the Baltimore Orioles in 1935, Gumbert was acquired by the New York Giants late in that season.

Gumbert was a member of the Giants' 1936–37 National League champions, as both a starting pitcher and reliever. He worked in relief in both the 1936 World Series and the 1937 Fall Classic, and was treated harshly by the victorious New York Yankees, allowing 12 hits and 12 earned runs in four total games pitched and 3 1/3 innings. Traded to the St. Louis Cardinals in May 1941, he worked for two more pennant winners and compiled a stellar .667 winning percentage (34–17) and earned run average (2.91) as a Redbird. He also made a brief appearance (two-thirds of an inning pitched, and no earned runs allowed) in the 1942 World Series, in which the Cardinals defeated the Yankees in five games. Gumbert spent his final five seasons in MLB with the second division Cincinnati Reds and Pittsburgh Pirates. As a reliever with Cincinnati, he led the NL in games pitched (61), games finished (46) and saves (17) in 1948. He missed the 1945 season while serving in the United States Army.

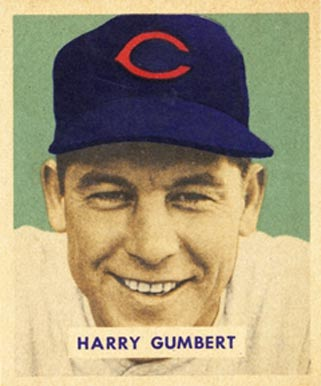
Gumbert in 1949

In his 15-season big league career, Gumbert compiled a 143–113 win–loss record, allowing 2,186 hits and 721 bases on balls in 2,156 innings pitched. He struck out 709, and registered 96 complete games, 13 shut outs and 46 career saves. Gumbert also was known as one of the best fielding pitchers of his time, as he tied a National League record set by Les Sweetland of the Philadelphia Phillies for assists by a pitcher, recording 10 on May 23, 1938.

As a hitter, Gumbert posted a .184 batting average (130-for-708) with 50 runs, 5 home runs and 45 RBIs in 512 games. Defensively, he recorded a .979 fielding percentage which was 18 points higher than the league average at his position.

== Post-baseball career ==
After baseball, he became the first president of the Masonic Lodge in Wimberley, Texas upon its founding in 1981. He died on January 4, 1995 in Wimberley.

== See also ==
- List of Major League Baseball annual saves leaders
