= Ralph Kiner =

American baseball player and broadcaster (1922–2014)

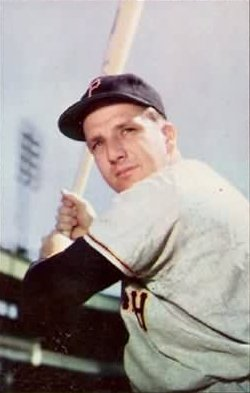
- Kiner with the Pittsburgh Pirates c. 1953
- Left fielder
- Born: October 27, 1922; Santa Rita, New Mexico, U.S.
- Died: February 6, 2014 (aged 91); Rancho Mirage, California, U.S.
- Batted: Right Threw: Right

MLB debut
- April 12, 1946, for the Pittsburgh Pirates

Last MLB appearance
- September 25, 1955, for the Cleveland Indians

MLB statistics
- Batting average: .279
- Home runs: 369
- Runs batted in: 1,015
- Stats at Baseball Reference

Teams
- Pittsburgh Pirates (1946–1953); Chicago Cubs (1953–1954); Cleveland Indians (1955)

Career highlights and awards
- 6× All-Star (1948–1953); 7× NL home run leader (1946–1952); NL RBI leader (1949); Pittsburgh Pirates No. 4 retired; Pittsburgh Pirates Hall of Fame; New York Mets Hall of Fame; New York Mets "microphone" honored

Member of the National

Baseball Hall of Fame
- Induction: 1975
- Vote: 75.4% (13th ballot)

Ralph McPherran Kiner (October 27, 1922 – February 6, 2014) was an American professional baseball left fielder in Major League Baseball (MLB) and later a broadcaster. Kiner played for the Pittsburgh Pirates, Chicago Cubs, and Cleveland Indians from 1946 through 1955.

Following his retirement, Kiner served from 1956 through 1960 as general manager of the Pacific Coast League San Diego Padres. He also served as an announcer for the New York Mets from the team's inception until his death. Though injuries forced his retirement from active play after 10 seasons, Kiner led all of his National League contemporaries in home runs in seven straight seasons between 1946 and 1952, a feat never previously accomplished in Major League Baseball and not matched since. He was elected to the Baseball Hall of Fame in 1975 on his 13th ballot.

After Kiner's death, baseball writer Marty Noble called him "one of baseball's genuine and most charming gentlemen."

== Early life ==
Kiner was born in Santa Rita, New Mexico, to Beatrice (née Grayson) and Ralph Macklin Kiner. His father died when Ralph was four and his mother took a job in Alhambra, California, where Kiner was subsequently raised. He was of Pennsylvania Dutch and Scotch-Irish descent, with German-Jewish ancestry through his maternal grandmother. Kiner graduated from Alhambra High School in Alhambra, California.

=== World War II Service ===
Kiner served as a U.S. Navy pilot during World War II.

Kiner was inducted into the Navy during the spring of 1943. As a cadet, he attended St. Mary's Pre-Flight School in California and earned his pilot's wings and commission at Corpus Christi, Texas, in December 1944. Kiner flew PBM Mariner flying boats on submarine patrols from Naval Air Station (NAS) Kaneohe Bay in Hawaii, accumulating 1,200 flying hours. Kiner enlisted the day after Pearl Harbor.

== Playing career (1946–1955) ==
Kiner made his major league debut on April 12, 1946, with the Pittsburgh Pirates. He finished the season with 23 home runs, but 109 strikeouts. After the season, the Pirates convinced future Hall of Famer Hank Greenberg not to retire. Greenberg gave Kiner hours of instruction, and in 1947, Kiner led the major leagues with 51 home runs while striking out fewer than 100 times.

Many of Kiner's homers were hit into a shortened left-field and left-center-field porch at Forbes Field (originally built for Greenberg and known in the press as "Greenberg Gardens"); the porch was retained for Kiner and redubbed "Kiner's Korner". Kiner would later use "Kiner's Korner" as the title of his post-game TV show in New York.

In 1949, Kiner topped his 1947 total with a peak of 127 RBIs and 54 home runs, with the latter falling just two short of Hack Wilson's then-National League record. It was the highest total in the major leagues from 1939 to 1960, and the highest National League total from 1931 to 1997. It made Kiner the first National League player with two 50 plus home run seasons. Success eluded Kiner with the Pirates, with the 1948 season being the only time he had a winning season with Pittsburgh. His 50-HR seasons with the Pirates in 1947 and 1949 were the first in MLB history to happen on teams that finished with a losing record; no player hit 50 home runs on a losing team until Cecil Fielder in 1990 and he was not surpassed in 50-HR seasons on losing teams until Mark McGwire surpassed him with his third season in 1999. From 1947 to 1951, Kiner topped 40 home runs and 100 RBIs each season. Through 2011 he was one of seven major leaguers to have had at least four 30-HR, 100-RBI seasons in their first five years, along with Chuck Klein, Joe DiMaggio, Ted Williams, Mark Teixeira, Albert Pujols, Ryan Howard and Ryan Braun.

Kiner's string of seasons leading the league in home runs reached seven in 1952, when he hit 37. This also was the last of a record six consecutive seasons in which he led Major League Baseball in home runs, all under the guidance of manager Billy Meyer and Pirate great Honus Wagner. He was selected to participate in the All-Star Game in six straight seasons, 1948 to 1953.

The equally famous "Home run hitters drive Cadillacs and singles hitters drive Fords," frequently misattributed to Kiner himself, was, by his own account, actually coined by teammate Fritz Ostermueller. Footage of Kiner hitting a home run in Forbes Field can be seen in the 1951 film Angels in the Outfield.

On June 4, 1953, Kiner was sent to the Chicago Cubs as part of a ten-player trade. The Pirates traded Kiner, Joe Garagiola, George Metkovich, and Howie Pollet to the Cubs in exchange for Bob Addis, Toby Atwell, George Freese, Gene Hermanski, Bob Schultz, Preston Ward, and $150,000. This was largely due to continued salary disputes with Pirates general manager Branch Rickey, who reportedly told Kiner, "We finished last with you, we can finish last without you."

Kiner played the rest of 1953 and all of 1954 with the Cubs, finishing his career with the Cleveland Indians in 1955. Cleveland finished second that year in Kiner's second and last season on a team that finished above .500, and Kiner batted .243 in 113 games with eighteen home runs. A back injury forced him to retire at the age of 32, finishing his career with 369 home runs, 1,015 runs batted in and a .279 lifetime batting average. He hit better than .300 three times, with a career best .313 with the Pirates in 1947.

== Broadcasting career (1961–2013) ==
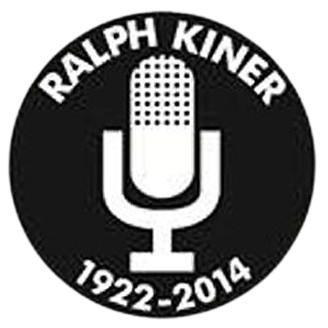
Ralph Kiner was honored alongside the retired numbers of the New York Mets in 2014.

In 1961, Kiner entered the broadcast booth for the Chicago White Sox. The following year, Kiner, Lindsey Nelson, and Bob Murphy began broadcasting the games of the expansion New York Mets on WOR-TV in New York City. The trio rotated announcing duties. Kiner also hosted a post-game show known as "Kiner's Korner" on WOR-TV. Nationally, he helped call the Mets' appearance in the 1969 and 1973 World Series for NBC Radio. He won a local Emmy Award for his broadcasting work.

Kiner was known for his occasional malapropisms, usually connected with getting people's names wrong, such as calling broadcasting partner Tim McCarver as "Tim MacArthur" and calling Gary Carter "Gary Cooper". He even once called himself "Ralph Korner".

Despite a bout with Bell's palsy, which left him with slightly slurred speech, Kiner continued broadcasting for 53 seasons. Kiner's tenure with the Mets was the third-longest for an active broadcaster with a single team as of his final season. He is the third longest-tenured broadcaster in baseball history, trailing only Los Angeles Dodgers announcers Vin Scully (1950–2016) and Jaime Jarrín (1959–2022). His traditional home run call—"It is gone, goodbye," was a signature phrase in baseball.

As illness reduced his appearances, Kiner featured less frequently on SportsNet New York (SNY) and WPIX, which currently televise Mets games. During these visits (usually once a week), regular announcers Gary Cohen, Keith Hernandez, and Ron Darling would welcome Kiner as he shared stories of the Golden Age of baseball, as well as the contemporary game. He broadcast every Mets opening day until 2013. During his final season in 2013, he was the oldest active announcer in Major League Baseball.

== Personal life ==
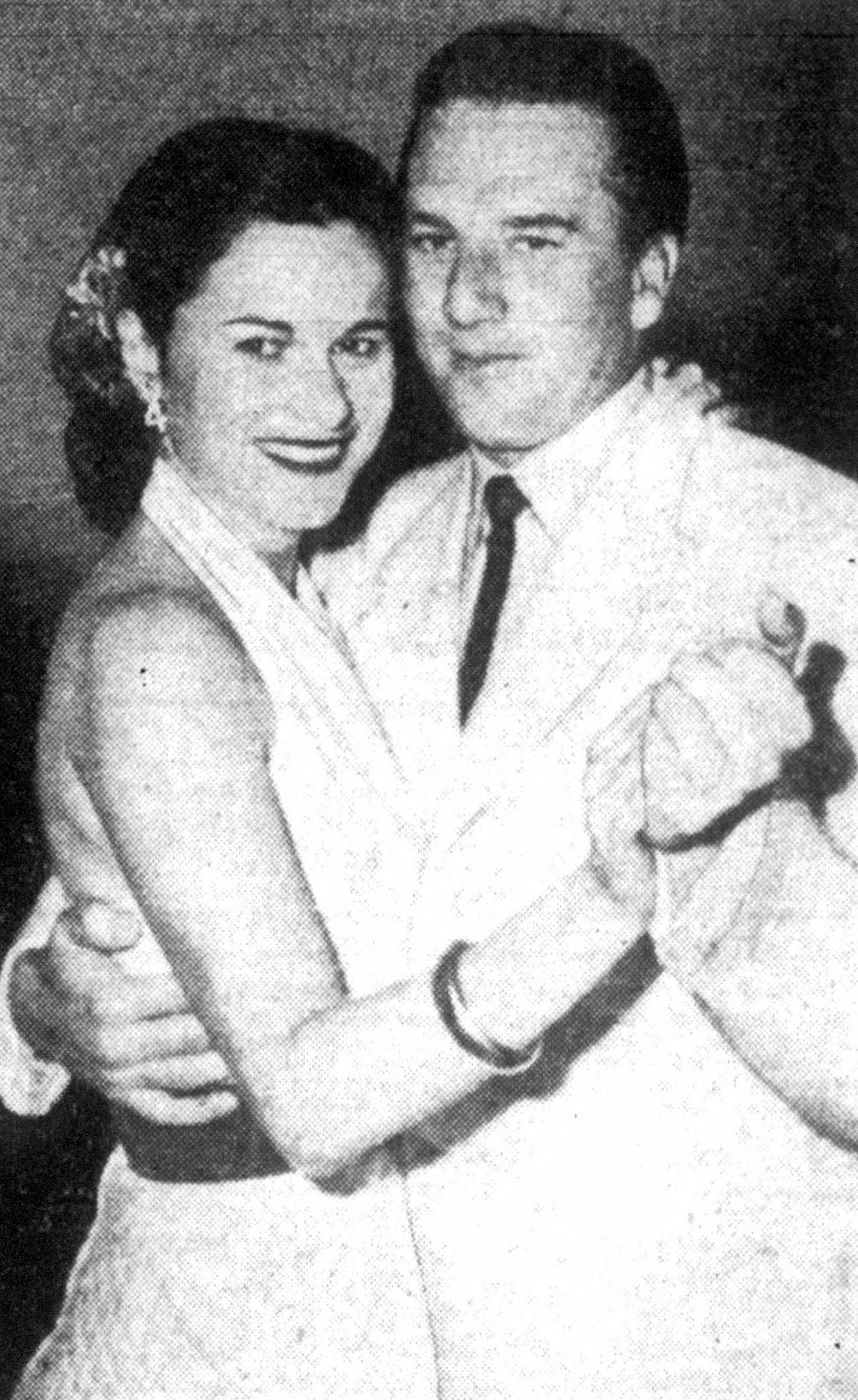
Kiner with his first wife, tennis player Nancy Chaffee at the Racquet Club of Palm Springs in 1953.

Kiner is the second cousin twice removed of MLB infielder Isiah Kiner-Falefa, through their common ancestor Mary McPherran Kiner of Mifflin County, Pennsylvania, who was Kiner's great-grandmother and Kiner-Falefa's great-great-great-grandmother.

Partly because Hollywood megastar Bing Crosby was part-owner of the Pirates, Kiner was often closely linked with celebrities such as Crosby's colleague Bob Hope and Frank Sinatra, but even more to publicized romances, dates, or photos with leading ladies, such as Elizabeth Taylor, Ava Gardner, and Janet Leigh. He was Taylor's date to the premiere of Twelve O'Clock High in 1949 and began dating Leigh when Angels in the Outfield was being filmed at Forbes Field.

Kiner was married four times; his first spouse was 1950s tennis star Nancy Chaffee from 1951 to 1968. They had three children together: Michael, Scott, and Kathryn.

Kiner was also married to Barbara (née George) Kiner from 1969 to 1980, and to DiAnn Kiner from 1982 until her death in 2004.

In his 80s, Kiner married, then divorced, Ann Benisch.

== Health and death ==
Ralph Kiner was diagnosed with Bell's palsy in January 1998. This, coupled with the effects of a stroke that he had suffered around 2004, forced him to reduce his broadcast schedule to a handful of games a season (down to approximately 40 games). He died from natural causes in Rancho Mirage, California, on February 6, 2014, at the age of 91. Upon his death, New York Mets owner Fred Wilpon said, "Ralph Kiner was one of the most beloved people in Mets history - an original Met and extraordinary gentleman."

== Legacy ==
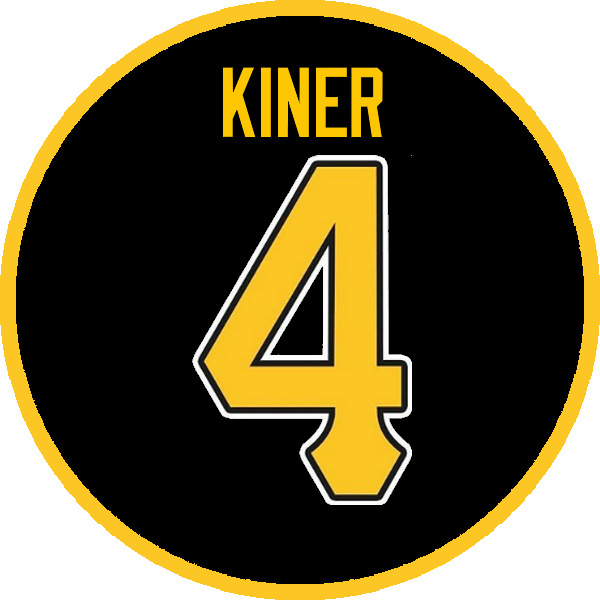
Ralph Kiner's number 4 was retired by the Pittsburgh Pirates in 1987.

Kiner was inducted into the Baseball Hall of Fame in 1975. Kiner had garnered 273 votes by the Baseball Writers' Association of America, one more than the minimum required for election. It was in his final year of eligibility (his 13th, as no vote was held in 1963 and 1965), and it was the closest call possible for any player elected by the BBWAA (any further votes would be before the Veterans Committee if he was not elected). Kiner was also the only player voted in that year. With 1,451 hits, he was the last batter to have been elected to the Hall of Fame on the BBWAA ballot with under 2,000 hits until Andruw Jones in 2026. He attended every Hall of Fame ceremony from the time he was inducted until his death.

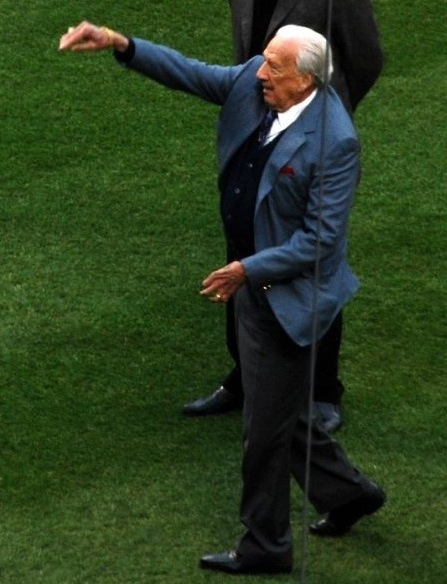
Kiner throws out the ceremonial first pitch at Citi Field in 2011

Kiner was elected to the New York Mets Hall of Fame in 1984.

The Pittsburgh Pirates retired his uniform number 4 on September 19, 1987. He was inducted into the Pirates Hall of Fame in 2022 as part of the inaugural class.

In 1999, The Sporting News placed Kiner at number 90 on its list of "The 100 Greatest Baseball Players". That same year, he was one of the 100 finalists for the Major League Baseball All-Century Team that year.

The Mets honored him with an on-field ceremony on "Ralph Kiner Night" at Shea Stadium on Saturday, July 14, 2007. On that night, fans were given photos of Kiner. Franchise icon Tom Seaver gave a commemorative speech recalling Kiner's legacy. Other guests of note were Yogi Berra, Bob Feller, and broadcaster Ernie Harwell. To honor his tenure, the Mets announced that the home broadcast booth at future home Citi Field would be named for Kiner (the booth at Shea had previously been named for him in 2002). As a present from the Mets, Kiner received a cruise of his choice.

In 2013, the Bob Feller Act of Valor Award honored Kiner as one of 37 Baseball Hall of Fame members for his service in the United States Navy during World War II.

In 2014, the Mets "retired" Kiner's broadcast microphone and added a logo featuring his name, dates and a vintage broadcast microphone to the left-field wall at Citi Field. They also wore patches with the logo for the season. The logo was later moved from the wall to the stadium's top tier alongside the franchise's other non-player honorees.

== See also ==
- Major League Baseball titles leaders
- List of Major League Baseball annual home run leaders
- List of Major League Baseball annual runs batted in leaders
- List of Major League Baseball annual runs scored leaders
- List of Major League Baseball career home run leaders
- List of Major League Baseball career runs batted in leaders
- List of Major League Baseball career OPS leaders
- List of Major League Baseball career on-base percentage leaders
- List of Major League Baseball career slugging percentage leaders
- List of Major League Baseball home run records
- List of Major League Baseball players to hit for the cycle

Awards and achievements
Preceded by George Kell	Hitting for the cycle June 25, 1950	Succeeded by Roy Smalley Jr.
