= Kiner's Korner =

Television series

Kiner's Korner is a postgame, and occasional pregame interview show which aired before or after New York Mets games on WOR-TV (now WWOR-TV) in New York City, hosted by Mets broadcaster Ralph Kiner. It debuted on April 30, 1963, with guests Buddy Hackett and Phil Foster. The show usually consisted of an interview with the star of the game from the winning team, along with game highlights and scores of other games from that day. Sometimes two players were featured. As years went by and Kiner's workload decreased, the show was on less frequently, usually following home games on free television. Kiner developed a reputation for occasionally incorrectly stating the names of players being interviewed or in highlights.

The show's theme music was Flag of Victory Polka, written by Alvino Rey under the name Ira Ironstrings. The show's name came from the close-in left field seats in Forbes Field where Kiner deposited many home runs during his Hall of Fame career as a Pirate slugger. They were originally known as "Greenberg's Gardens" for Kiner's precursor and mentor Hank Greenberg, but earned their new name after Greenberg's retirement and Kiner's meteoric rise to stardom. It measured 340 feet to left field. The temporary fence was removed in the 1950s to restore it to the original 365 feet.

In 2010, SNY.TV, (website of SportsNet New York, the Mets' cable network), announced the replaying of nine classic episodes of Kiner's Korner on the web, in a series entitled "Kiner's Korner Revisited". While the network was in possession of several episodes, many had been lost or taped over.

MLB-credentialed writer and co-author of Down on the Korner, Mark Rosenman, has continued the legacy of Kiner's Korner through KinersKorner.com . On the site, each night a "seat on the Korner" is awarded to the star of the game, emulating the original show's postgame honors as if it were still on the air.
