= History of the Pittsburgh Pirates =

The following is a history of the Pittsburgh Pirates of Major League Baseball.

== Franchise beginnings (1870s–1899) ==
=== Early baseball in Pittsburgh and the American Association ===
An early mention of "base ball" in the region is found in an issue of the Pittsburgh Gazette from 1857. After the Civil War, baseball was sufficiently popular that the city fielded several amateur teams considered to be strong: the Enterprise, Xantha, and Olympic clubs. The teams often competed at Union Park in what was then known as Allegheny City, across the Allegheny River from Pittsburgh.

Recognized professional baseball in the Pittsburgh area began in 1876, when organizers formed the Allegheny Base Ball Club, an independent (non-league) club, as the ownership group lost their bid in February to join the newly created National League. The now-pro Allegheny played their first game in April of that year. The team joined the minor league International Association in 1877 and posted a decent 13–6 record, featuring future Hall of Fame pitcher Pud Galvin. But the Allegheny was hit hard in 1878 by player defections and competition from other, better-established teams in Pittsburgh, and the club folded.

On October 15, 1881, Denny McKnight held a meeting at Pittsburgh's St. Clair Hotel to organize a new Allegheny club, which began play in 1882 as a founding member of the American Association (AA). The league was created to take on the established National League. Chartered as the Allegheny Base Ball Club of Pittsburgh, the team was listed as "Allegheny" in the newspapers, and on occasion the "Alleghenys" or "Alleghenies" in that era's custom of referring to a team by its pluralized city or club name. The team played its games at Exposition Park I & II, located between the present-day site of Heinz Field and the Pirates' current home, PNC Park, before persistent flooding forced a move in 1884 to higher ground at Union (Recreation) Park.

The Allegheny had limited success during their five years in the AA. A .500 inaugural season was followed by two inept campaigns, including a disastrous 1884 effort in which the Alleghenys went 30–78 and used five different managers. The next year's team, aided by the signing of many players from the disbanded Columbus Buckeyes, rebounded to a marginally winning record and a third-place finish in the league.

Following their best showing in the AA—an 80–57 record and a second-place finish—Pittsburgh became the first AA team to switch to the older National League in 1887. At the time, William A. Nimick was club president and Horace Phillips manager.

=== Early struggles in the National League ===
The Alleghenys were severely crippled during the 1890 season, when nearly all of their stars jumped to the Pittsburgh Burghers of the Players' League. With a decimated roster, the team experienced what is still the worst season in franchise history, going 23–113. The allegiances of Pittsburgh baseball fans also jumped to Players League, leading to trouble at the box office for the Alleghenys. The Alleghenys ended up playing their last 29 home games on the road, and finished the season with a total attendance of about 16,000 fans.

Fortunately for the Alleghenys, the Players' League collapsed after a single season and the players were allowed to return to their former teams. A reorganized Pittsburgh club, formed from a merger of the Alleghenys and the Burghers, recovered the services of several players who had jumped to the upstart league a year earlier.

The new owners also signed highly regarded second baseman Lou Bierbauer, who had previously played with the AA's Philadelphia Athletics. The Athletics failed to include him on their reserve list, and Pittsburgh picked him up. Nonetheless, this led to loud protests by the Athletics, and in an official complaint, an AA official claimed Pittsburgh's actions were "piratical". This incident (which is discussed at some length in The Beer and Whisky League, by David Nemec, 1994) quickly accelerated into a schism between the leagues that contributed to the demise of the AA. Although the Pittsburgh club was never found guilty of wrongdoing, its allegedly "piratical" act gained it the occasional nickname "Pirates" starting in 1891. Within a few years, the nickname caught on with Pittsburgh newspapers. Additional nicknames for the team in the 1890s included the Patriots, the Alleghenies (sometimes shortened to Allies) and the Braves. By the turn of the century, "Pirates" had become the most popular nickname, and was first acknowledged on the team's uniforms in 1912.

The team moved into the reconstructed Exposition Park, built on the site of the previous Exposition parks but now with a capacity of 10,000. The Pirates experience a modicum of success in the early 1890s, finishing just five games back of the pennant-winning Boston Beaneaters in 1893. The rest of the decade was more mediocre, with the club consistently placing in the bottom half of the league.

After the 1899 season, the Pirates made what is arguably the best player transaction in franchise history when they picked up nearly all of the star players from the Louisville Colonels. Louisville owner Barney Dreyfuss had been told that the Colonels were slated for elimination when the N.L. contracted from 12 to 8 teams. He secretly purchased a half-interest in the Pirates, then after the season sent nearly all of the Colonels' stars up the Ohio River to Pittsburgh. Since the transaction occurred before the Colonels officially folded, it was structured as a trade; the Pirates sent four relatively unknown players to Louisville. Despite their nickname, the Pirates at least waited until after the season to pull off this blockbuster trade. This is unlike what happened in 1899 to the Cleveland Spiders and, to a lesser extent, the Baltimore Orioles, who were also part of two-team ownerships. Dreyfuss later bought full control of the team and kept it until his death in 1932.

== Success under the Dreyfuss family (1900–1950) ==
=== NL dominance, a World Series, and a world title ===
Bolstered by former Colonels shortstop and Pittsburgh native Honus Wagner, along with player/manager Fred Clarke, the Pirates completely dominated the National League, in part because they lost few star players to the rival American League. A .500 team in 1899, the Pirates immediately saw improvement in the new century, finishing with a 79–60 record in 1900 and just 4 1/2 games behind the Brooklyn Superbas. The following season, the Pirates won their first National League title, and followed that up with pennants in 1902 and 1903.

Dreyfuss had taken a leading role amongst baseball owners and helped the National League broker peace with the upstart American League, recognizing both leagues as major leagues and instituting one set of rules. With Dreyfuss' 1903 squad well on its way to another NL pennant, he asked Henry Killilea, owner of the American League-leading Boston Americans, if he would be interested in scheduling a postseason series between the champions of each league. That series, recognized as the first modern World Series ever played, saw the Americans defeat the favored Pirates in eight games. Deacon Phillippe pitched five complete games, winning three of them, but Pittsburgh was plagued by injuries and a bad performance from Wagner, who batted only 6-for-27 (.222) in the Series and committed six errors.

The Pirates remained one of the premier teams in the National League through the first decade of the 1900s, never finishing lower than fourth (and then, only once), but could not get past the stronger Chicago Cubs or New York Giants. In 1908, the Pirates played in Pittsburgh for the first time, as the team's several parks had all been located in Allegheny City, which was a separate city until annexed by Pittsburgh in December 1907.

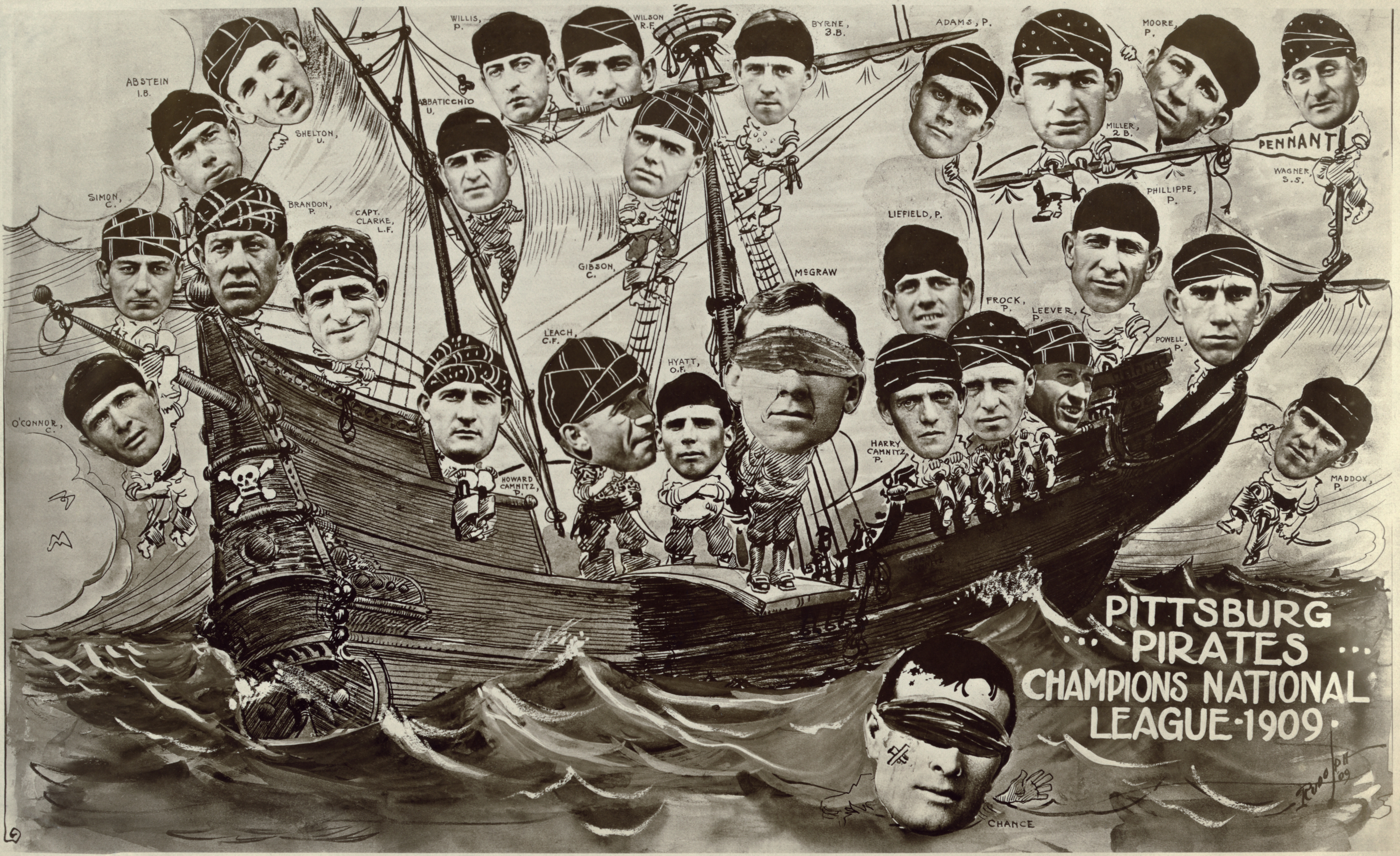
The 1909 Pirates in a poster celebrating their National League pennant. Frank Chance of the Chicago Cubs and John McGraw of the New York Giants, two teams the Pirates beat for the pennant, are being made to walk the plank.

Partway through the 1909 season, the Bucs moved out of their longtime home at Exposition Park to the new Forbes Field in Pittsburgh's Oakland neighborhood. The increasingly large crowds coming to see games overwhelmed the cramped, wooden Exposition Park, which was prone to flooding from the nearby Allegheny River. The new stadium could seat an additional 7,000 spectators compared to Exposition Park, and was constructed out of concrete and steel, a novel concept at the time. The site was initially labeled "Dreyfuss's Folly" due to its long distance—a 10-minute trolley ride—from downtown Pittsburgh, but the land around the park developed and criticisms were dropped. In Forbes Field's inaugural year, the Pirates finished first in the National League with 110 wins (still a franchise record) and 42 losses. Pittsburgh faced off against the Detroit Tigers, who were making their third consecutive appearance in the World Series. The series was billed as a matchup between the major leagues' two superstars, Wagner and Ty Cobb. Both men would be among the five elected to the Baseball Hall of Fame's inaugural class, but Wagner was the better player in 1909. Atoning for his bum performance in 1903, he hit .333 to Cobb's .231 as the Pirates took the series in seven games, winning their first world title.

=== Return to relevance in the 1920s ===
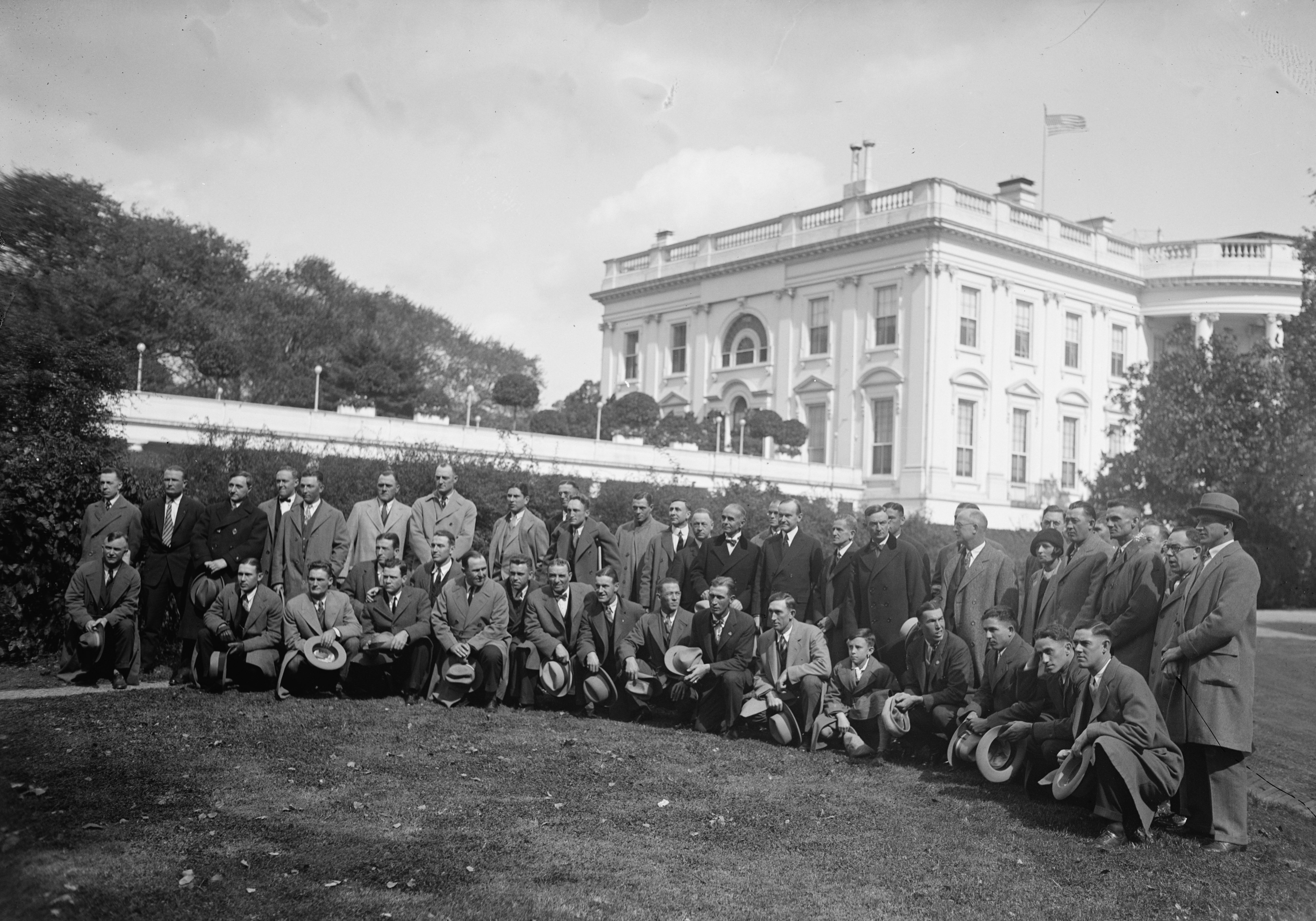
The Pirates at the White House during the 1925 World Series, where they won their second title

The Pirates remained a competitive team in the early part of the 1910s but began to slip down the standings as their stars aged and declined. This downward trend led to a number of losing seasons and culminated in a disastrous 1917 campaign, in which the Bucs went 51–103 and Wagner retired. However, the seeds of the next competitive Pirates team had already been planted. Veteran outfielder Max Carey and young players Pie Traynor and Kiki Cuyler, along with a remarkably deep pitching staff, brought the Pirates back into the spotlight in the early 1920s. The Pirates recovered from a 3–1 deficit to win the 1925 World Series over the Washington Senators, and reached the 1927 World Series before being swept by the New York Yankees, who at that time had built the most dominant team in baseball. The 1927 season was the first for the sharp-hitting combination of brothers Lloyd Waner and Paul Waner, who along with shortstop Arky Vaughan ensured that the Pirates had plenty of Hall of Fame-caliber position players through the 1930s.

=== Benswanger takes over and the end of Dreyfuss family ownership ===
Dreyfuss had groomed his son, Samuel, to take over the Pirates upon his death, but Samuel died of pneumonia at age 35 in 1931. When the elder Dreyfuss died the following year, ownership of the Pirates passed on to his widow, Florence. She prevailed upon her son-in-law, William Benswanger, to take over operations as team president. Benswanger inherited a team with a strong foundation that included the future hall of famer Waner brothers, Vaughan, and player/manager Traynor. Between 1932 and 1938 the Pirates consistently finished in the National League's first division, posting only one losing season during that span. But the club never returned to the World Series in that stretch, finishing in second place three times. In 1938, the Pirates entered September with a seven-game lead for the NL pennant, but were passed by the Cubs in the final week of the season, thanks to the infamous Homer in the Gloamin'.

In the 1930s, several teams found sustained success—most notably the St. Louis Cardinals—through the development of farm systems, which provided an endless supply of young, cheap ballplayers. The Pirates were late to developing a farm system and slipped down the standings as a result. Benswanger made comments to the press that he sought to improve the Pirates by signing African-American players during the 1930s and 1940s, going as far as planning a tryout, but the other owners refused to break baseball's color barrier.

In August 1946, the long era of ownership by the Barney Dreyfuss family came to an end when Benswanger sold the team to a syndicate led by Indianapolis businessman Frank McKinney; the group also included entertainer Bing Crosby, Pittsburgh attorney Thomas P. Johnson, and Columbus, Ohio-based real estate tycoon John W. Galbreath. The new owners seemingly scored a coup when they purchased veteran slugger Hank Greenberg from the Detroit Tigers for the 1947 season. The Hall-of-Fame-bound Greenberg, then 36, had led the American League in home runs (44) and runs batted in (127) in 1946, his first full season after almost five years in military service. But a contentious relationship with the Detroit front office ended his 12-year career with the Tigers after a .319 batting average, 306 homers and 1,528 hits.

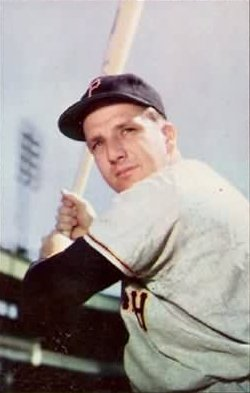
1953 Bowman Color baseball card of Ralph Kiner. Kiner led the NL in home runs for seven straight seasons (1946–1952), although he shared the HR title on three occasions.

With Greenberg a fearsome, right-handed power hitter, the Pirates' new ownership decided to make Forbes Field a more inviting home run destination. They reduced the previously cavernous dimensions of the left field and left-center-field section of the park by 30 feet (9.1 m) by moving the bullpens to the base of the old left field wall, behind a new fence that was 335 feet (102 m) from home plate down the left-field line.

The shorter porch was immediately dubbed "Greenberg Gardens" in honor of the former Tiger. As events turned out, however, Greenberg's playing career was winding down rapidly. He played only 125 games for the 1947 Pirates, hit 25 home runs (18 at Forbes Field), batted only .249, and then retired from the game. Ralph Kiner—who, as rookie, had led the National League in homers with 23 playing in the old Forbes Field—became the beneficiary of the new left-field configuration, which was quickly renamed "Kiner's Korner". He slugged 51 home runs in 1947, then followed with seasons of 40, 54, 47, 42 and 37 blasts to lead the NL, sharing the home run title with Johnny Mize (1947–1948) and Hank Sauer (1952). Kiner led or co-led the National League in home runs for seven consecutive seasons (1946–1952) and was elected to the Baseball Hall of Fame in 1975.

Throughout their history, the Pirates' colors had been red, white and blue, which was standard for baseball teams in the early 1900s. In 1948, the Bucs updated their colors to yellow, black and white, matching the colors of the flag of Pittsburgh. The color scheme was already being used by the city's professional football franchise, the Steelers, and would later be adopted by the Pittsburgh Penguins.

== Galbreath ownership: A Pirates dynasty (1950–1985) ==
=== Rickey's rebuild and Mazeroski's Series-clinching home run ===
While attendance figures at Forbes Field rose to among the top in the NL, the team built around Kiner placed in the first division only once—in 1948—and in 1952 compiled one of the worst records in major league history, winning 42 and losing 112 games (.273) and finishing 54 1/2 games out of first place. The new ownership group reorganized during 1950, when Galbreath, Crosby and Johnson bought out McKinney's investment, and Galbreath became majority owner. His family would control the destiny of the Pirates for the next 35 years.

Galbreath's first major move, the hiring of Branch Rickey as general manager after the 1950 campaign, was initially a great disappointment to Pittsburgh fans. Rickey had invented the farm system with the Cardinals and broken the baseball color line with the Dodgers, building dynasties with each club. In Pittsburgh, though, he purged the roster of its higher-salaried veterans (including Kiner in 1953) and flooded the team with young players. Many of those youngsters faltered, but those who fulfilled Rickey's faith in them—pitchers Vern Law, Bob Friend and Elroy Face, shortstop Dick Groat, second baseman Bill Mazeroski, and especially outfielder Roberto Clemente, drafted from Brooklyn after his only minor league season (1954)—would form the nucleus of the Pirates' 1960 championship club. Moreover, as in St. Louis and Brooklyn, Rickey put into place one of baseball's most successful farm and scouting systems, keeping the Pirates competitive into the late 1970s. However, all this was not evident when Rickey (then 73) retired due to ill health in 1955, with the Pirates still struggling to escape the NL basement. "Kiner's Korner", meanwhile, was demolished in 1954, restoring Forbes Field to its previous, pitching-friendly contour.

The 1948 team was the only postwar Pirates squad with a winning record until 1958, Danny Murtaugh's first full season as manager. Murtaugh is widely credited with inventing the concept of the closer by frequently playing Face late in close games. The 1960 team featured eight All-Stars, but was widely predicted to lose the World Series to a powerful New York Yankees team. In one of the most memorable World Series in history, the Pirates were defeated by ten or more runs in three games, won three close games, then recovered from a 7–4 deficit late in Game 7 eventually to win on a walk-off home run by Mazeroski, a second baseman better known for defensive wizardry. The 1960 Pirates were the only team between 1945 and 2001 to have not succumbed to the so-called "Ex-Cubs Factor" in the postseason. They also became the first team to win a World Series on a home run, a feat later achieved by the Toronto Blue Jays in 1993, although Joe Carter's home run came in Game 6 of the 1993 Series. Mazeroski's homer remains the only walk-off home run in Game 7 of a World Series.

The 1960s would continue with effective defensive play by Bill Mazeroski and the offensive and defensive abilities of Clemente, baseball's first Puerto Rican superstar. Clemente was regarded as one of the game's best all-time hitters, and possessed a tremendous arm in right field. Although not the first black-Hispanic baseball player (an honor belonging to Minnie Miñoso), Clemente's charisma and leadership in humanitarian causes made him an icon across the continent. During his playing career, Clemente was often overlooked, but today many consider him to have been one of the greatest right fielders in baseball history.

Even with Roberto Clemente, however, the Pirates struggled to post winning marks from 1961 to 1964, and Murtaugh was replaced by Harry Walker in 1965. With Walker, a renowned batting coach, at the helm, and the hitting of Clemente, Matty Alou, Manny Mota and others, the Bucs fielded contending, 90+ win teams in both 1965 and 1966, with Clemente claiming the National League MVP Award in the latter year. However, Pittsburgh had no answer for the pitching of the Dodgers and the San Francisco Giants, and finished third both seasons. In 1967, they fell back to .500, and did not contend through the rest of the 1960s.

=== A decade of dominance: 1970–1979 and "The Family" ===
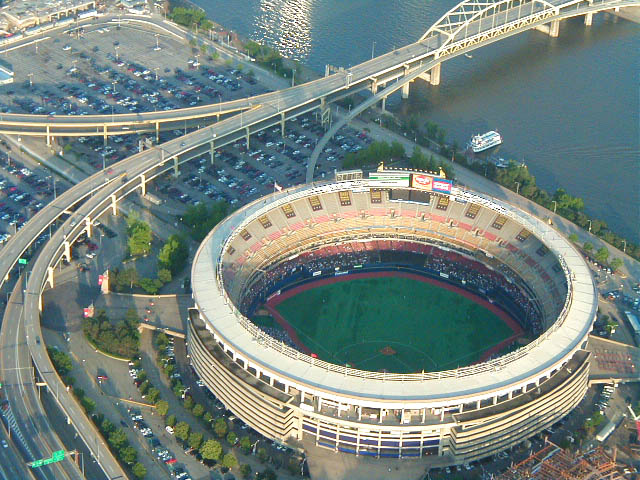
Aerial view of Three Rivers Stadium

==== 1970–1973 ====
Slugger Willie Stargell became a fixture in the Pittsburgh lineup in the late 1960s, and the Pirates returned to prominence in 1970. Murtaugh returned as manager and the Pirates' home field, Forbes Field, was demolished in favor of the multi-purpose Three Rivers Stadium. In 1970, the Pirates won their first of five National League East division titles over the next seven years, and won their fourth World Series in 1971 behind a .414 Series batting average by Clemente. They also thought they had a genuine superstar pitcher (historically rare for the Pirates) in Steve Blass, who pitched two masterful games in the World Series against Baltimore and had excellent seasons in 1968 and 1972.

On September 1, 1971, the Pirates made Major League Baseball history by fielding the first all-black/minority starting lineup: second baseman Rennie Stennett, center fielder Gene Clines, right fielder Roberto Clemente, left fielder Willie Stargell, catcher Manny Sanguillén, third baseman Dave Cash, first baseman Al Oliver, shortstop Jackie Hernández, and pitcher Dock Ellis. Manager Danny Murtaugh had never hesitated using minority players in the lineup, but even the players took notice when he posted the lineup that day. Blass later recalled, "The thing I remember about it, when he was interviewed afterwards, Murtaugh said, 'I put the nine best athletes out there. The best nine I put out there tonight happened to be black. No big deal. Next question.'"

The sports world was stunned and saddened when Clemente died in a plane crash on December 31, 1972, while accompanying a shipment of relief supplies to the victims of an earthquake in Nicaragua. Tom Walker, then-Montreal Expos pitcher and future father of Pirates second baseman Neil Walker, offered to join Clemente that day but Clemente insisted that he stay home. Thus, Roberto Clemente had an influence on the 2013 playoff run. He had reached a milestone by rapping his 3,000th career hit, a stand-up double off Jon Matlack of the New York Mets on September 30, 1972, in what would prove to be his last regular-season at-bat. The Baseball Hall of Fame waived its usual waiting requirement and inducted Clemente immediately. Pittsburgh would erect a statue and name a bridge and park near the stadium after him, as well as a street in the Oakland neighborhood near the former site of Forbes Field.

In 1973, Blass suffered a mysterious decline in his pitching abilities, posting a 9.85 ERA. To this day, pitchers who suddenly lose the ability to throw strikes are said to have "Steve Blass disease". Blass retired from baseball after the 1974 season. He later joined the Pirates' television and radio broadcast team in 1983 as a part-time color commentator, earning a full-time post in 1986. Before the 2005 season, he announced that he would announce only home games from then on to spend more time with his family. Blass retired from broadcasting in 2019 after 60 years with the organization as a player and broadcaster.

==== 1974–1978 ====
The Pirates made the playoffs in 1974 and 1975, but lost the National League Championship Series to the Los Angeles Dodgers and the Cincinnati Reds, respectively. The speedy Omar Moreno and the power-hitting Dave Parker joined Stargell in the lineup during this period. After the 1976 season, in which the Bucs finished in second place behind the cross-state Philadelphia Phillies, Danny Murtaugh died. The Pirates struck a trade with the Oakland Athletics in which catcher Manny Sanguillén was sent to Oakland for manager Chuck Tanner. The Pirates would finish second to the Phillies once again in 1977, with Parker winning a batting title. It was also in 1977 that the Pirates began wearing yellow and black uniforms with pillbox caps. Stargell would award teammates with "Stargell Stars" on their caps for excellent plays on the field. The following year, the Pirates turned the end of the 1978 season into an impromptu race for the NL East, as they tried to chase down the collapsing Phillies, who ultimately won the division, only to fall short during the final home stand of the season (ironically against the Phillies). Despite this, Parker won another batting title and was named National League MVP to go with it.

==== 1979 ====
Adopting the popular song "We Are Family" by the Philadelphia disco group Sister Sledge as their theme song, the 1979 Pirates held off the Montreal Expos to claim the pennant. "We Are Family" was elevated from theme song to anthem status (and is still nearly synonymous with the 1979 Pirates), with fans chanting "Fam-a-lee!" from the stands. The Pirates faced the Baltimore Orioles again in the World Series, which (like 1971) they won in seven games, on October 17, 1979. During the 1979 championship season, a Pirate player was designated as Most Valuable Player in every available category: All-Star Game MVP (Dave Parker), NL Championship Series MVP (Willie Stargell), World Series MVP (Willie Stargell), and National League MVP (Willie Stargell, shared with Keith Hernandez of the Cardinals).

=== Decline in 1980s and end of Galbreath ownership ===
Despite their on-field success, the Pirates struggled to draw fans in the late 1970s, as the steel crisis devastated Pittsburgh's economy and led to a regional population drain. At the same time, payroll costs were rising due to free agency. In 1979, the Pirates had the highest payroll in baseball ($4.2 million) but only drew 1.43 million fans, ranking 18th out of MLB's 26 teams. Attendance continued to decline in the early 1980s as Pittsburgh's economic woes continued and the Pirates slipped down the standings. Claiming massive losses, Galbreath said he was ready to move on from the Pirates after three decades and was looking to sell.

Edward J. Lewis of Oxford Development made a serious offer to purchase the team in early 1981, as did shopping mall tycoon and Youngstown, Ohio native Edward J. DeBartolo, Sr., who had purchased the Pittsburgh Penguins from bankruptcy in 1977. Both the cities of New Orleans, Louisiana and Tampa, Florida put packages together to attempt to lure the team out of Pittsburgh, and the team's future in the city it had called home for more than 100 years seemed seriously in doubt.

The 1985 season was one of the lowest points in team history. Amidst rumors that the team would relocate, the Pirates lost 104 games, their most since 1954. Efforts to show fans support like "Ballot by Ballpark" day—in which local media encouraged fans to pack Three Rivers Stadium—did little to move ownership. Meanwhile, the Pittsburgh drug trials held in the city that summer saw several Pirate players called to the stand to testify on drug use, and even the Pirate Parrot was implicated for buying cocaine and introducing a few of the ballplayers to a local drug dealer.

== Uncertain future in Pittsburgh (1985–2000) ==
=== The Leyland era: Three division titles, zero pennants ===
At the end of the 1985 season, the Galbreath family sold the franchise to the Pittsburgh Associates, a consortium of area businesses determined to keep the team from relocating. Jim Leyland took over as manager in 1986, and under his guidance the Pirates gradually climbed out of the cellar. They featured young and exciting players such as the "outfield of dreams" consisting of Bobby Bonilla, Barry Bonds, and Andy Van Slyke; infielders Jay Bell, Steve Buechele, Sid Bream, and José Lind; catcher Mike LaValliere, and pitchers Doug Drabek, John Smiley, and Stan Belinda.

In 1988, the young team finished 85–75 and seemed ready to compete for a pennant. However, the 1989 season was a major setback, with injuries depleting the squad and leading to a fifth-place finish. Among the low points of the season was a game against rival Philadelphia Phillies in Philadelphia on June 8, 1989, where the Pirates became the first team in major-league history to score 10 runs in the first inning and nevertheless lose the game. Pirates broadcaster (and former pitcher) Jim Rooker famously vowed that if the team blew the lead, he would walk home from Philadelphia—a vow he fulfilled after the season while raising money for charity.

Pirates clinch the Division Title in St. Louis, 1990.

The Pirates would win the first three NL East titles of the 1990s, but failed to advance to the World Series each time. In 1990, the Pirates faced off against their old rivals, the Reds, and fell to the eventual world champion in six games. The Pirates were even better in 1991, easily winning the National League East by 14 games, but they once again fell in the NLCS despite taking a 3–2 lead in the series. The young, upstart Atlanta Braves won Games 6 and 7 at Three Rivers Stadium, denying the Pirates' bid for their 10th National League pennant. Despite losing Bonilla to free agency in the 1991–92 offseason, the Pirates won their third consecutive division title and once again faced off against the Braves in the 1992 National League Championship Series. Atlanta took a 3–1 lead in the series, but the Pirates won Games 5 and 6 to force a deciding Game 7 in Atlanta. Drabek pitched into the 9th inning as the Pirates clung to a 2–0 lead; he was removed after the Braves loaded the bases with no outs. Reliever Stan Belinda retired two Braves on a sacrifice fly and a pop-out, and the Pirates were only one out away from going to the World Series. Pinch hitter Francisco Cabrera singled to left, scoring two runners—including Sid Bream, a former Pirate and one of the slowest players in baseball- to win the series for Atlanta.

That offseason, Drabek and Bonds became free agents, and the Pirates' internal replacements were insufficient to keep the team competitive. The Bucs finished with a below-.500 record in 1993, the first of 20 consecutive losing seasons that would become a record for the four major professional North American sports leagues. As the team slipped down the standings in the mid-1990s, the Pittsburgh Associates looked to find a buyer for the team, and rumors once again circulated that the team would be moved. The ownership group was only intended to be a short-term steward of franchise to ensure its future in Pittsburgh, but the Associates ended up owning the Pirates for more than a decade.

=== McClatchy buys the team ===
In 1996, McClatchy publishing company chairman Kevin McClatchy led a group of investors to purchase the Pirates for $95 million. McClatchy immediately moved forward with a two-pronged plan to return the Pirates to relevance: off the field, the Pirates would need a new ballpark to replace the aging Three Rivers Stadium and increase revenue streams; on the field, the Pirates would need to cut payroll, trade players for prospects, and build up the farm system. Leyland, unwilling to endure a rebuild, quit after the 1996 season, being replaced in his capacity by Gene Lamont.

At first, the plan seemed to be working: despite fielding a league-low $9 million payroll, the 1997 squad—known as the "Freak Show"—remained in contention for the newly created National League Central for most of the summer. The following year, the city pushed through funding for a new, baseball-only stadium on the North Shore. As construction on the new ballpark took place down the street, the Pirates failed to build on their 1997 season. General manager Cam Bonifay sought to have a winning team in place for the opening of the new stadium in 2001, but the Pirates lost 93 games in 1998 and again in 2000.

== A new ballpark and continued struggles (2001–present) ==
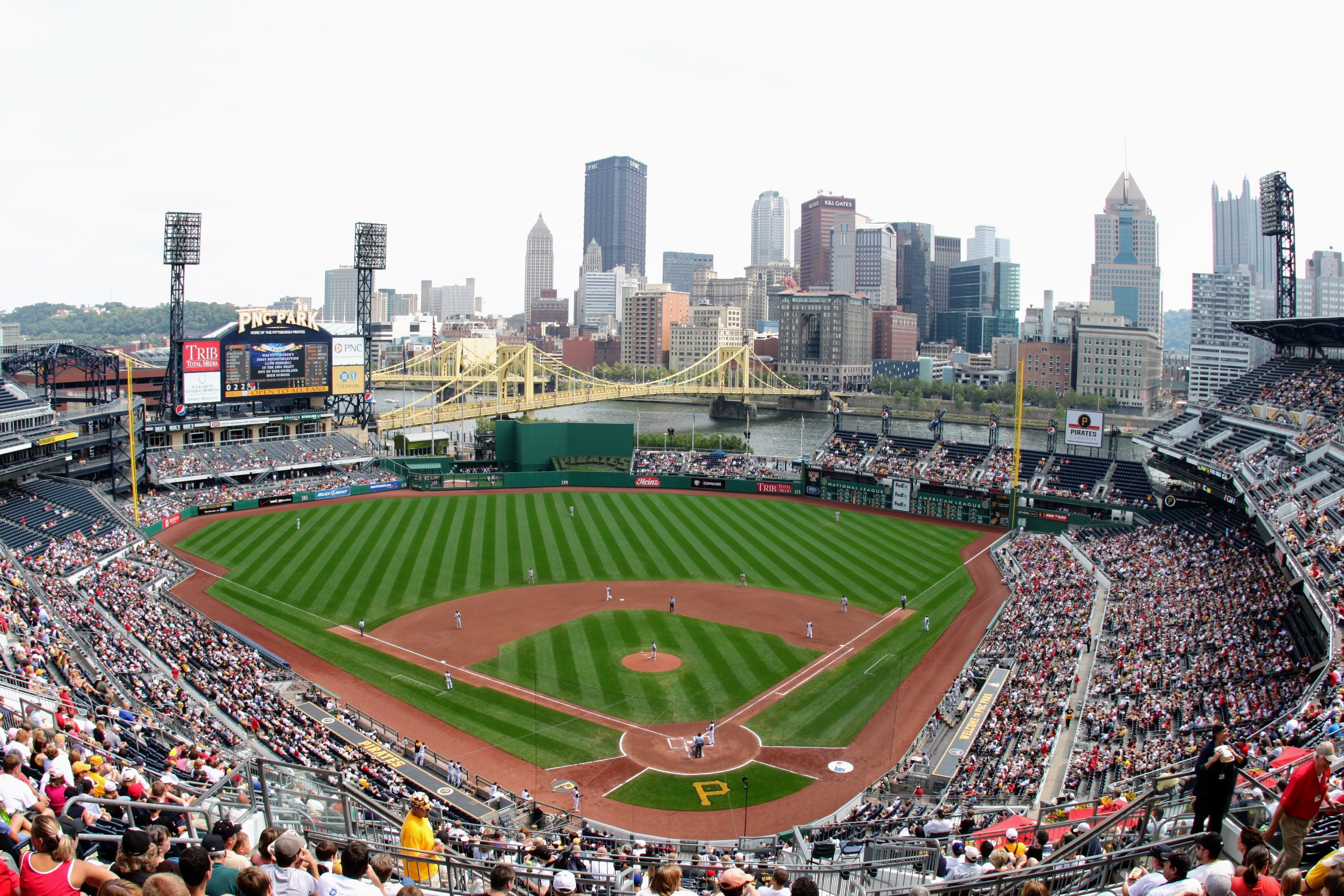
PNC Park opened in 2001.

In 2001, the Pirates opened a new stadium, PNC Park, featuring a simple concept and strategic usage of the Pittsburgh skyline.

General manager Dave Littlefield was installed July 13, 2001, midway through the 2001 season, and began overhauling the team to comply with owner Kevin McClatchy's dictum to drastically reduce the payroll. Enigmatic but talented third baseman Aramis Ramírez was traded to the Chicago Cubs in 2003 for a fairly minimal return under pressure to dump his $6 million salary for 2004, and he proceeded to become a star for the Cubs. Brian Giles was one of the National League's best hitters for several years, but he and his $9 million salary were also traded in 2003 to the San Diego Padres for youngsters Óliver Pérez, Jason Bay, and Cory Stewart. Pirate fans found this trade much more palatable in the short run, as Pérez led the majors in strikeouts per inning and Bay won the Rookie of the Year Award in 2004, while Giles put up a subpar season by his standards. After the 2004 season, Jason Kendall went to the Oakland Athletics in a cross-exchange of high-salary players.

Illustrating the Pirates' rebuilding efforts, at the close of the 2005 season, the team fielded the youngest roster in baseball, with an average age of 26.6 years. During the course of the season, 14 players were called up from its Triple-A affiliate. On September 6, manager Lloyd McClendon was fired after 5 losing seasons. On October 11, Jim Tracy was hired as the new manager. The 2006 season got off to a slow start with the Pirates losing their first six games. The Bucs stood at an abysmal 30–60 mark by the time they hosted the All Star Game at PNC Park. During the second half of the season, however, the Pirates made a successful turnaround and finished the second half with a 37–35 record. This is the first time the Pirates have finished the second half of the season with a winning record since 1992. Third baseman Freddy Sanchez won the National League batting title for the 2006 season with an average of .344.

The 2007 season was a year of transition for the Pirates. Bob Nutting replaced McClatchy as majority owner, becoming the sixth majority owner in Pirates history. On July 6, 2007, Kevin McClatchy announced he was stepping down as the Pirates CEO at the end of the 2007 season. On September 7, 2007, Nutting fired general manager Dave Littlefield.

=== 2008–2019: The Huntington era ===
The Pittsburgh Pirates began to shape their organizational management team late in the 2007 season. On September 13, Frank Coonelly, chief labor counsel for Major League Baseball, was introduced as the team's new president. On September 25, 2007, the Pirates announced the hiring of Neal Huntington, formerly a scout in the Cleveland Guardians organization, as the team's new general manager. On October 5, 2007, Jim Tracy was fired by the Pirates and replaced by Ottawa Lynx manager John Russell, who was named the new manager a month later. Russell had originally been the third base coach under prior manager Lloyd McClendon from 2003 to 2005.

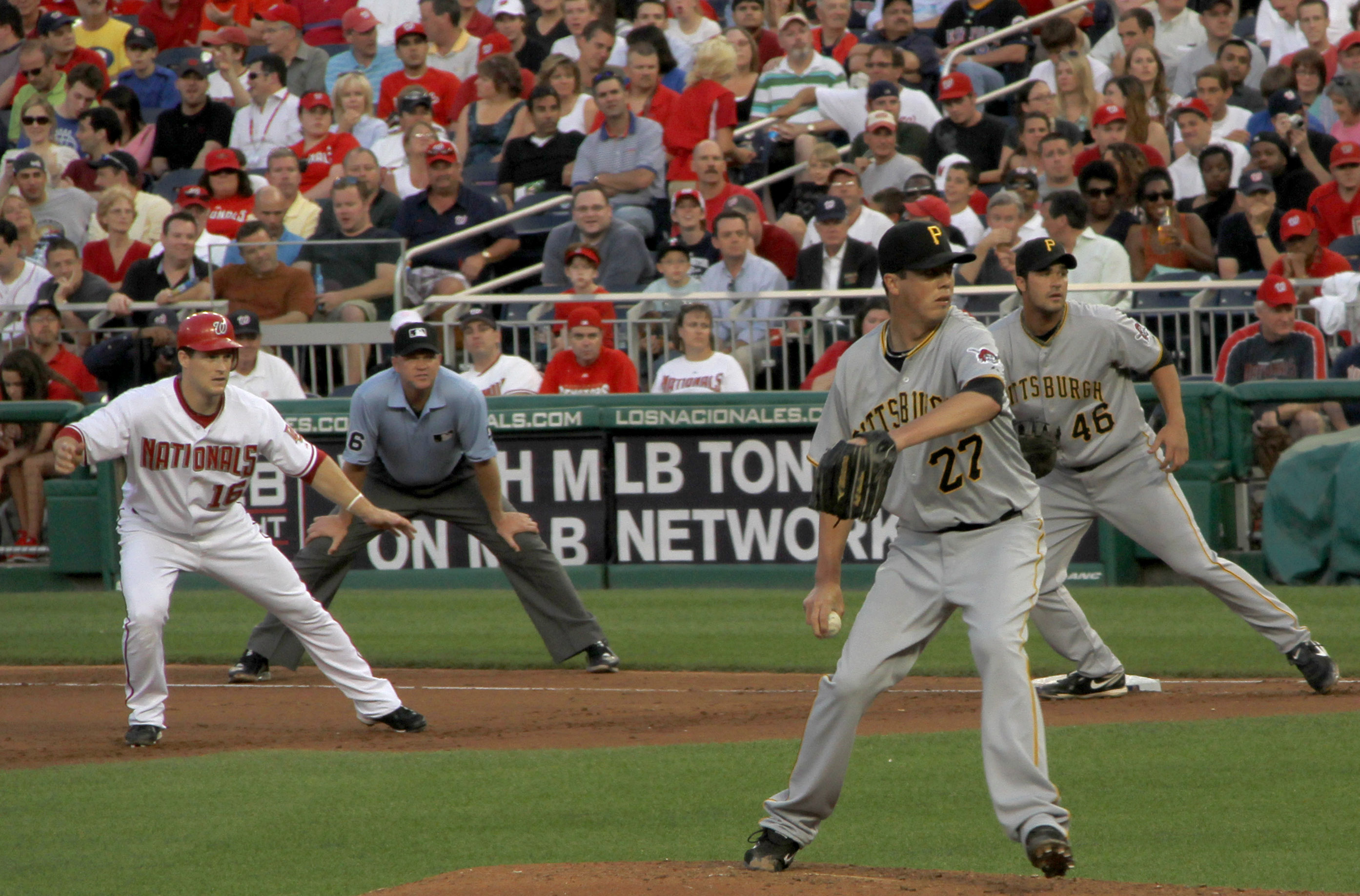
A Pirates–Nationals game in 2010

Under Huntington, the team began another round of rebuilding. Prior to the 2008 trade deadline, the Pirates made several deals that sent several accomplished veterans to other franchises: left fielder Xavier Nady and pitcher Dámaso Marte were sent to the New York Yankees in return for José Tábata, Ross Ohlendorf, Dan McCutchen, and Jeff Karstens; Jason Bay was traded to the Boston Red Sox in a three-team deal that brought Andy LaRoche, Bryan Morris, Brandon Moss and Craig Hansen to Pittsburgh. On November 24, the Pirates signed Rinku Singh and Dinesh Patel as undrafted free agents, making them the first Indian citizens to sign a contract with any American professional sports team. Both men are pitchers, who were first spotted in the "Million Dollar Arm" contest organized in India by J.B. Bernstein earlier in 2008.

The roster teardown continued in 2009, as the team's only 2008 All-Star Nate McLouth was traded to the Atlanta Braves for prospects Jeff Locke, Charlie Morton and Gorkys Hernández. On June 30, the team dealt Nyjer Morgan and Sean Burnett to the Washington Nationals, as well as sending utility player Eric Hinske to the New York Yankees. This upset some Pirates players, including Adam LaRoche and Jack Wilson, who questioned the direction of the team. LaRoche was later traded to the Red Sox in exchange for minor leaguers Hunter Strickland and Argenis Díaz, while Wilson was sent to the Seattle Mariners for shortstop Ronny Cedeño and several minor leaguers. The Pirates also traded Sanchez to the San Francisco Giants in exchange for Tim Alderson. On September 7, the Pirates were defeated by the Chicago Cubs 4–2, clinching the longest streak of consecutive losing seasons in any North American professional sport. The Pirates fared even worse in 2010, going 57–105. It was the worst record in baseball, the first time the Pirates had lost at least 100 games since 2001, and the most losses for the team since 1985. Russell was fired after the season.

==== 2011–2012: Late season collapses ====
On November 14, 2010, the Pirates announced that Clint Hurdle would serve as the club's new manager. Hurdle managed the pennant-winning 2007 Colorado Rockies and was the hitting coach for the American League Champion Texas Rangers in 2010.

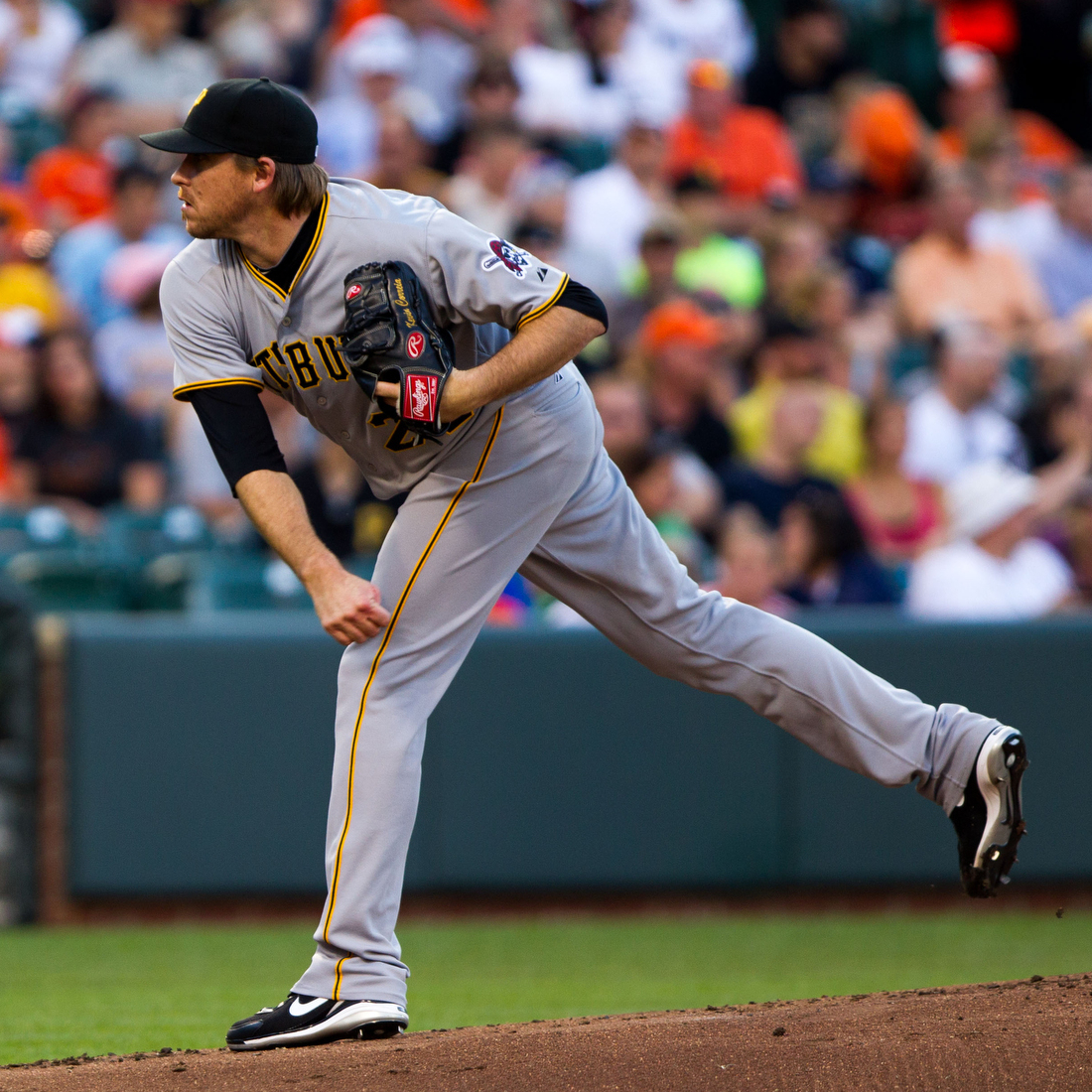
Kevin Correia, June 2012

The 2011 season had a promising start, as the Pirates were above .500 at the All-Star Break for the first time since 1992. The Pirates also sent three players to the 2011 All-Star Game with the selections of starting pitcher Kevin Correia, closer Joel Hanrahan, and center fielder Andrew McCutchen. On July 15, and again on July 18, the Pirates moved into first place of the NL Central. This marked the first two times that the Pirates were in first place this late in the season since 1997. On July 26, a questionable call at home plate led to a 19-inning loss against the Atlanta Braves. The Pirates then won only one game from that point to August 8, including a season-high 10-game losing streak in that span. Despite a promising season, with a loss to the St. Louis Cardinals on September 14, 2011, the team lost its 82nd game of the season, ensuring a 19-year losing season streak.

In 2012, the Pirates aggressively pursued and acquired Yankees pitcher A. J. Burnett to bolster their starting pitching staff. During the first few months of the season the Bucs' pitching staff held up well, but the offense was sluggish. The bats began to pick up in June and by July, the Pirates had soared to first place in the NL Central at the All Star break—the first time the Bucs entered the break at first place since the "Freak Show" team of 1997. Andrew McCutchen would lead the majors in batting average and the "Power of Zoltan" (reference to a character scene in the movie Dude, Where's My Car?) began to sweep PNC Park and the city of Pittsburgh.

The Pirates were 63–47 on August 8, but a stunning disintegration left the team scuffling down the stretch, effectively eliminating them from the NL Central race and the Wild card race. On September 28, the Pirates were no-hit by Cincinnati Reds pitcher Homer Bailey; the loss was their 81st of the season, ensuring their 20th consecutive non-winning season. They lost their 82nd game on September 30, clinching their 20th consecutive losing season, extending the longest such streak in North American sports history. They are also the only Major League Baseball team to be 16 games over .500 after two-thirds of the season complete and finish with a losing record.

==== 2013–2015: Return to the playoffs ====
After two consecutive seasons of late season collapses, Huntington and Hurdle were determined to be aggressive in free agency, adding players and veteran leadership that would stave off another collapse in 2013. In the offseason, the team signed veteran catcher Russell Martin to a two-year, $17 million deal. Martin, while providing decent offensive numbers, was considered to be a major defensive upgrade over the previous year's platoon of Rod Barajas and Michael McKenry. In 2012, Barajas and McKenry had combined to throw out 19 of 173 baserunners, for a caught stealing percentage of 11%, while Martin held a career caught stealing percentage of 30.25% entering the 2013 season. On December 26, 2012, the Pirates traded closer Joel Hanrahan and infielder Brock Holt to the Boston Red Sox for reliever Mark Melancon and several prospects. The Pirates also re-signed setup man Jason Grilli to a two-year, $4.5 million contract to become the new Pirates closer. Melancon, who was coming off a miserable, injury-riddled 2012 season, replaced Grilli as the Pirates setup man. The trade wound up leaning strongly in favor of the Pirates, as Grilli and Melancon would anchor the so-called "Shark Tank" bullpen as one of the best bullpens in MLB as well as both being selected to the All-Star Game, while Hanrahan wound up only playing in nine games for the Red Sox before suffering an injury to his pitching arm and requiring Tommy John surgery that effectively ended his career. On February 8, 2013, the Pirates finalized a two-year, $12.75 million deal with starting pitcher Francisco Liriano.

Despite starting the season with a 1–5 record, the Pirates quickly heated up and moved above .500 for good after a 3–1 victory over the Braves on April 20. By June, the Pirates had the best record in baseball and spent the rest of the summer battling with Cincinnati and St. Louis for first place in the N.L. Central. Though the Pirates made no trades before the July 31 deadline, they added to the lineup in August, acquiring Marlon Byrd and John Buck from the New York Mets and Justin Morneau from the Minnesota Twins. On September 3, the Pirates defeated the Milwaukee Brewers 4–3 to win their 81st game of the season, clinching their first non-losing season since 1992. Then, following a four-game losing streak, the Pirates defeated the Texas Rangers 1–0 on September 9 for their 82nd win, clinching their first winning season in 21 years. 14 days later, due to a combination of a Pirates win and a Nationals' loss to the St. Louis Cardinals, the Pirates headed to postseason play for the first time in 21 seasons. By finishing the season with a three-game sweep of Cincinnati, their chief competition for the NL Wild Card, the Pirates hosted and won their first home playoff game since 1992 in the National League Wild Card Game on October 1, by a score of 6–2.

That victory put the Pirates into the National League Division Series against the St. Louis Cardinals. On October 3, the Cardinals rode a 7-run inning to a 9–1 win over the Pirates. The Pirates evened the series with a 7–1 victory on in Game 2 on October 4, tying the series heading into Game 3. The Pirates then took a 2–1 series lead by defeating the Cardinals in dramatic fashion at home 5–3 before dropping the remaining two games to the Cardinals by scores of 2–1 and 6–1, thereby being eliminated from further postseason play.

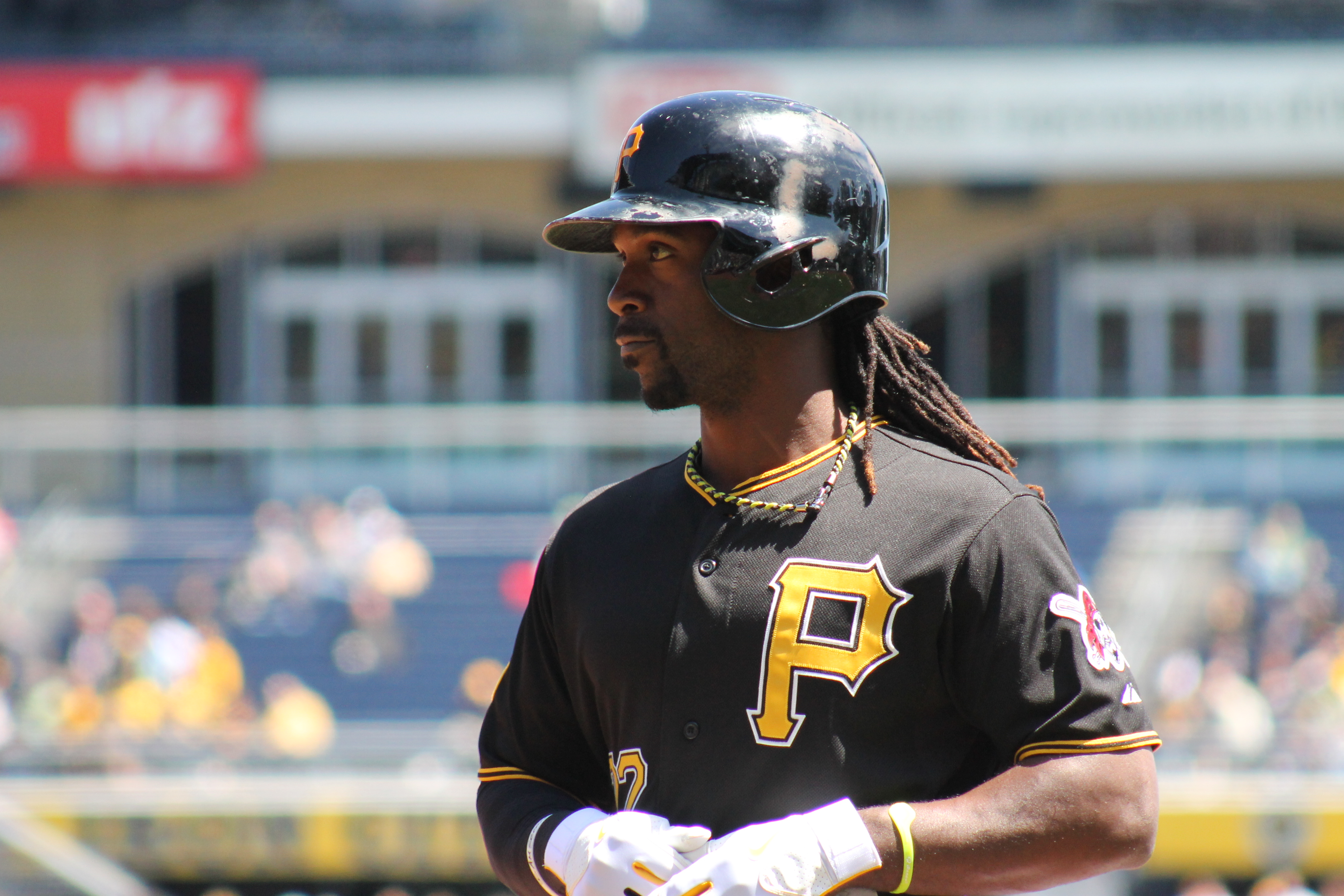
Andrew McCutchen during a game in 2014

In 2014, the Pirates made the National League Wild Card game but lost at home to the eventual World Series champion San Francisco Giants by a score of 8–0. Brandon Crawford hit a grand slam while the Pirates could not recover and were once again denied a playoff series win.

In 2015, the Pirates finished with the second best record in baseball at 98–64; however, despite many injuries to key players, the division rival St. Louis Cardinals had the best record in baseball at 100–62, winning the NL Central. The 98-win season was good enough to ensure another home Wild Card game, this time hosting the 97-win Chicago Cubs. The eventual 2015 NL Cy Young winner, Jake Arrieta, pitched dominantly for the Cubs, hurling a complete-game shutout, handing the Pirates a 4–0 loss.

==== 2016–2019: End of the Huntington era ====
The Pirates had a quiet 2015–16 offseason, trading away Neil Walker for pitcher Jon Niese and essentially dumping Charlie Morton. The biggest free agent signing was John Jaso on a two-year, $8 million deal. The Pirates remained on the fringes of the playoff race for most of the 2016 season despite disappointing performances from Gerrit Cole, Liriano and McCutchen, the latter of whom had the worst season of his career. The Pirates went 11–19 over September and October to finish 78–83, under .500 and out of the playoffs for the first time since 2012.

In 2017, the Pirates hoped bounce-back seasons from Cole and McCutchen, along with strong performances from young players like Jameson Taillon and Tyler Glasnow, would put the Pirates back in the playoff hunt. Again, the team hung around the edges of the playoff race until August despite Starling Marte's PED suspension. The team finished with a 75–87 record, 4th place in the division and 12 games out of a playoff spot.

The team made massive changes during the 2018 offseason, trading Cole to the Houston Astros and McCutchen to the San Francisco Giants for younger players. Bryan Reynolds, acquired in the McCutchen deal, became a Rookie of the Year contender in 2019. Cole, however, immediately became one of the best pitchers in baseball with the Astros, while the four players the Pirates acquired mostly struggled in Pittsburgh.

After an inconsistent start, the Pirates roared back into the playoff race with an 11-game win streak in July. The team traded for Keone Kela at the trade deadline and then acquired pitcher Chris Archer in a blockbuster deal with the Tampa Bay Rays for Tyler Glasnow, Austin Meadows and Shane Baz. Despite being seen as a fair trade at the time, the trade ended up backfiring spectacularly as Archer struggled while Meadows and Glasnow enjoyed great success in Tampa. The Pirates finished 82–79, just their fourth winning season in 25 years, but 8 games out of a wild-card spot.

Despite a quiet offseason in 2019, the Pirates were expected to contend in the National League Central. After jumping out to a 12–6 start, the team spent much of the first half of the season around .500, but went into the All-Star break only 2.5 games out of first place. Despite an underwhelming rotation, the team's offense was powered by rookie Bryan Reynolds a breakout season from Josh Bell, who was elected to the All-Star game.

The Pirates fell apart in the second half of the season, going 25–48. In addition to their on-field struggles, the team suffered from problems off the field as well, including brawls, fights between players in the clubhouse, and the arrest of closer Felipe Vazquez. The Pirates finished with a 69–93 record, the team's worst since 2010.

Manager Clint Hurdle was fired before the final game of the 2019 season, with bench coach Tom Prince serving as interim manager. Prince and pitching coach Ray Searage were fired several days later.

On October 23, Pirates president Frank Coonelly parted ways with the team. Huntington was fired on October 28.

=== 2020–present: The Cherington era ===
Nutting announced the first hire of the new regime on October 28, 2019, naming Travis Williams the new team president. Huntington was fired the same day. Former Boston Red Sox general manager Ben Cherington was named as the next general manager of the Pirates on November 18. On November 27, the Pirates announced that former Minnesota Twins bench coach Derek Shelton would serve as the team's manager.

In the Pirates' first season under Shelton and Cherington, they went 19–41, finishing with the worst record of the pandemic-shortened season. The Pirates again finished last in the NL Central in 2021. After two distant fourth place finishes, the team returned to last place in 2024 despite Paul Skenes winning the Rookie of the Year Award and finishing third in Cy Young Award voting. Shelton was fired in May 2025, replaced by bench coach Don Kelly.
