= 1891 Philadelphia Phillies season =

National League season

1891 Philadelphia Phillies
- League: National League
- Ballpark: Philadelphia Base Ball Grounds
- City: Philadelphia, Pennsylvania
- Record: 68–69 (.496)
- League place: 4th
- Owners: Al Reach, John Rogers
- Manager: Harry Wright

== Spring Training ==
The Phillies held spring training in 1891 in Cape May, New Jersey where the team stayed at the Aldine Hotel. The team had planned to practice at the Cape May Athletic Field, where the team held spring training 1888. Finding it unfit, the Phillies instead practiced on the Gas House field. It was the second of three seasons the Phillies trained in Cape May.

== Regular season ==
After the season it was reported that the Phillies had earned about $5,000 in profit on the season.

=== Season standings ===
National League
Team	W	L	Pct.	GB	Home	Road
Boston Beaneaters	87	51	.630	—	51‍–‍20	36‍–‍31
Chicago Colts	82	53	.607	3½	43‍–‍22	39‍–‍31
New York Giants	71	61	.538	13	39‍–‍28	32‍–‍33
Philadelphia Phillies	68	69	.496	18½	35‍–‍34	33‍–‍35
Cleveland Spiders	65	74	.468	22½	40‍–‍28	25‍–‍46
Brooklyn Grooms	61	76	.445	25½	41‍–‍31	20‍–‍45
Cincinnati Reds	56	81	.409	30½	26‍–‍41	30‍–‍40
Pittsburgh Pirates	55	80	.407	30½	32‍–‍34	23‍–‍46

=== Record vs. opponents ===
1891 National League record Sources:
Team	BSN	BRO	CHI	CIN	CLE	NYG	PHI	PIT
Boston	—	15–5	7–13	11–9	11–9	15–5–1	12–7	16–3–1
Brooklyn	5–15	—	7–13	9–10	11–9	8–11	12–8	9–10
Chicago	13–7	13–7	—	14–6	16–4	5–13–1	9–10	12–6–1
Cincinnati	9–11	10–9	6–14	—	7–13	5–13–1	9–11	10–10
Cleveland	9–11	9–11	4–16	13–7	—	6–13–1	10–10–1	14–6
New York	5–15–1	11–8	13–5–1	13–5–1	13–6–1	—	9–10	7–12
Philadelphia	7–12	8–12	10–9	11–9	10–10–1	10–9	—	12–8
Pittsburgh	3–16–1	10–9	6–12–1	10–10	6–14	12–7	8–12	—

=== Roster ===
1891 Philadelphia Phillies
Roster
Pitchers: Ed Cassian; Duke Esper; Kid Gleason; Joe Gormley; Tim Keefe; Mike Kilroy; Bill Kling; Phil Saylor; John Schultz; Phenomenal Smith; John Thornton	Catchers: Jack Clements; Jocko Fields; Billy Graulich; Bill Gray; Infielders: Bob Allen; Charlie Bastian; William Brown; Jerry Denny; Ed Mayer; Harry Morelock; Al Myers; Billy Shindle	Outfielders: Ed Delahanty; Alexander Donoghue; Billy Hamilton; Walter Plock; Sam Thompson	Manager: Harry Wright

== Player stats ==
=== Batting ===
==== Starters by position ====
Note: Pos = Position; G = Games played; AB = At bats; H = Hits; Avg. = Batting average; HR = Home runs; RBI = Runs batted in

Pos	Player	G	AB	H	Avg.	HR	RBI
C	Jack Clements	107	423	131	.310	4	75
1B	William Brown	115	441	107	.243	0	50
2B	Al Myers	135	514	118	.230	2	69
SS	Bob Allen	118	438	97	.221	1	51
3B	Billy Shindle	103	415	87	.210	0	38
OF	Sam Thompson	133	554	163	.294	7	90
OF	Ed Delahanty	128	543	132	.243	5	86
OF	Billy Hamilton	133	527	179	.340	2	60

==== Other batters ====
Note: G = Games played; AB = At bats; H = Hits; Avg. = Batting average; HR = Home runs; RBI = Runs batted in

Player	G	AB	H	Avg.	HR	RBI
Ed Mayer	68	268	50	.187	0	31
Bill Gray	23	75	18	.240	0	7
Jerry Denny	19	73	21	.288	0	11
Jocko Fields	8	30	7	.233	0	5
Billy Graulich	7	26	8	.308	0	3
Alexander Donoghue	6	22	7	.318	0	2
Harry Morelock	4	14	1	.071	0	0
Walter Plock	2	5	2	.400	0	0
Charlie Bastian	1	0	0	----	0	0

=== Pitching ===
==== Starting pitchers ====
Note: G = Games pitched; IP = Innings pitched; W = Wins; L = Losses; ERA = Earned run average; SO = Strikeouts

Player	G	IP	W	L	ERA	SO
Kid Gleason	53	418.0	24	22	3.51	100
Duke Esper	39	296.0	20	15	3.56	108
John Thornton	37	269.0	15	16	3.68	52
Tim Keefe	11	78.1	3	6	3.91	34
Joe Gormley	1	8.0	0	1	5.63	2

==== Other pitchers ====
Note: G = Games pitched; IP = Innings pitched; W = Wins; L = Losses; ERA = Earned run average; SO = Strikeouts

Player	G	IP	W	L	ERA	SO
Bill Kling	12	75.0	4	2	4.32	26
Ed Cassian	6	38.0	1	3	2.84	10
Phenomenal Smith	3	19.0	1	1	4.26	3
Mike Kilroy	3	10.0	0	2	9.90	3

==== Relief pitchers ====
Note: G = Games pitched; W = Wins; L = Losses; SV = Saves; ERA = Earned run average; SO = Strikeouts

Player	G	W	L	SV	ERA	SO
John Schultz	6	0	1	0	6.60	4
Phil Saylor	1	0	0	0	6.00	0
