= 1891 Cleveland Spiders season =

1891 Cleveland Spiders
- League: National League
- Ballpark: League Park
- City: Cleveland, Ohio
- Record: 65–74 (.468)
- League place: 5th
- Owner: Frank Robison
- Managers: Robert Leadley, Patsy Tebeau

The 1891 Cleveland Spiders season was a season in American baseball. They finished with a 65–74 record and a fifth-place finish in the National League.

The Spiders moved to a new ballpark in 1891. League Park was financed by Spiders owner Frank Robison, and it would be the team's home for the remainder of their existence. It would also be home to the Cleveland Indians.

The Spiders also had a new manager. Patsy Tebeau, the team's starting third baseman, was named manager midway through the season. He remained the Spiders manager until his contract was reassigned to the St. Louis Perfectos before the 1899 season.

== Regular season ==
=== Season standings ===
National League
Team	W	L	Pct.	GB	Home	Road
Boston Beaneaters	87	51	.630	—	51‍–‍20	36‍–‍31
Chicago Colts	82	53	.607	3½	43‍–‍22	39‍–‍31
New York Giants	71	61	.538	13	39‍–‍28	32‍–‍33
Philadelphia Phillies	68	69	.496	18½	35‍–‍34	33‍–‍35
Cleveland Spiders	65	74	.468	22½	40‍–‍28	25‍–‍46
Brooklyn Grooms	61	76	.445	25½	41‍–‍31	20‍–‍45
Cincinnati Reds	56	81	.409	30½	26‍–‍41	30‍–‍40
Pittsburgh Pirates	55	80	.407	30½	32‍–‍34	23‍–‍46

=== Record vs. opponents ===
1891 National League record Sources:
Team	BSN	BRO	CHI	CIN	CLE	NYG	PHI	PIT
Boston	—	15–5	7–13	11–9	11–9	15–5–1	12–7	16–3–1
Brooklyn	5–15	—	7–13	9–10	11–9	8–11	12–8	9–10
Chicago	13–7	13–7	—	14–6	16–4	5–13–1	9–10	12–6–1
Cincinnati	9–11	10–9	6–14	—	7–13	5–13–1	9–11	10–10
Cleveland	9–11	9–11	4–16	13–7	—	6–13–1	10–10–1	14–6
New York	5–15–1	11–8	13–5–1	13–5–1	13–6–1	—	9–10	7–12
Philadelphia	7–12	8–12	10–9	11–9	10–10–1	10–9	—	12–8
Pittsburgh	3–16–1	10–9	6–12–1	10–10	6–14	12–7	8–12	—

=== Roster ===
1891 Cleveland Spiders
Roster
Pitchers: Ed Beatin; Charlie Getzien; Henry Gruber; Henry Killeen; Frank Knauss; Lee Viau; Cy Young	Catchers: Jack Doyle; Chief Zimmer; Infielders: Billy Alvord; Cupid Childs; Jerry Denny; Ed McKean; Patsy Tebeau; Jake Virtue	Outfielders: Jesse Burkett; Bill Collins; Joe Daly; George Davis; Spud Johnson; Jimmy McAleer; Ed Seward; John Shearon; Marty Sullivan	Manager: Robert Leadley; Patsy Tebeau

== Player stats ==
=== Batting ===
==== Starters by position ====
Note: Pos = Position; G = Games played; AB = At bats; H = Hits; Avg. = Batting average; HR = Home runs; RBI = Runs batted in

Pos	Player	G	AB	H	Avg.	HR	RBI
C	Chief Zimmer	116	440	112	.255	3	69
1B	Jake Virtue	139	517	135	.261	2	72
2B	Cupid Childs	141	551	155	.281	2	83
SS	Ed McKean	141	603	170	.282	6	69
3B	Patsy Tebeau	61	249	65	.261	1	41
OF	Jimmy McAleer	136	565	135	.239	1	61
OF	Spud Johnson	80	327	84	.257	1	46
OF	George Davis	136	570	165	.289	3	89

==== Other batters ====
Note: G = Games played; AB = At bats; H = Hits; Avg. = Batting average; HR = Home runs; RBI = Runs batted in

Player	G	AB	H	Avg.	HR	RBI
Jack Doyle	69	250	69	.276	0	43
Jesse Burkett	40	167	45	.269	0	13
Jerry Denny	36	138	31	.225	0	21
John Shearon	30	124	30	.242	0	13
Billy Alvord	13	59	17	.288	1	7
Ed Seward	7	19	4	.211	0	1
Marty Sullivan	1	4	1	.250	0	1
Joe Daly	1	3	0	.000	0	0
Bill Collins	2	3	0	.000	0	0

=== Pitching ===
==== Starting pitchers ====
Note: G = Games pitched; IP = Innings pitched; W = Wins; L = Losses; ERA = Earned run average; SO = Strikeouts

Player	G	IP	W	L	ERA	SO
Cy Young	55	423.2	27	22	2.85	147
Henry Gruber	44	348.2	17	22	4.13	79
Lee Viau	45	343.2	18	17	3.01	130
John Shearon	6	46.0	1	3	3.52	19
Ed Beatin	5	29.0	0	3	5.28	4
Ed Seward	3	16.1	2	1	3.86	4
Frank Knauss	3	15.0	0	3	7.20	6
Pretzels Getzien	1	9.0	0	1	8.00	4
Henry Killeen	1	8.2	0	1	6.23	3

==== Relief pitchers ====
Note: G = Games pitched; W = Wins; L = Losses; SV = Saves; ERA = Earned run average; SO = Strikeouts

Player	G	W	L	SV	ERA	SO
George Davis	3	0	1	1	15.75	4
