= 1891 Pittsburgh Pirates season =

1891 Pittsburgh Pirates
- League: National League
- Ballpark: Exposition Park
- City: Allegheny, Pennsylvania
- Record: 55–80 (.407)
- League place: 8th
- Owner: William A. Nimick
- Managers: Bill McGunnigle: 1st season, 24–33 (.421); Ned Hanlon: 1st season, 31–47 (.397)

The 1891 Pittsburgh Pirates season was the tenth season of the Pittsburgh Pirates franchise and the first season under the "Pirates" name; their fifth place in the National League. The Pirates finished eighth and last in the National League with a record of 55–80–2 (.407), 30.5 games behind the first-place Boston Beaneaters.

== Regular season ==
=== Season standings ===
National League
Team	W	L	Pct.	GB	Home	Road
Boston Beaneaters	87	51	.630	—	51‍–‍20	36‍–‍31
Chicago Colts	82	53	.607	3½	43‍–‍22	39‍–‍31
New York Giants	71	61	.538	13	39‍–‍28	32‍–‍33
Philadelphia Phillies	68	69	.496	18½	35‍–‍34	33‍–‍35
Cleveland Spiders	65	74	.468	22½	40‍–‍28	25‍–‍46
Brooklyn Grooms	61	76	.445	25½	41‍–‍31	20‍–‍45
Cincinnati Reds	56	81	.409	30½	26‍–‍41	30‍–‍40
Pittsburgh Pirates	55	80	.407	30½	32‍–‍34	23‍–‍46

=== Record vs. opponents ===
1891 National League record Sources:
Team	BSN	BRO	CHI	CIN	CLE	NYG	PHI	PIT
Boston	—	15–5	7–13	11–9	11–9	15–5–1	12–7	16–3–1
Brooklyn	5–15	—	7–13	9–10	11–9	8–11	12–8	9–10
Chicago	13–7	13–7	—	14–6	16–4	5–13–1	9–10	12–6–1
Cincinnati	9–11	10–9	6–14	—	7–13	5–13–1	9–11	10–10
Cleveland	9–11	9–11	4–16	13–7	—	6–13–1	10–10–1	14–6
New York	5–15–1	11–8	13–5–1	13–5–1	13–6–1	—	9–10	7–12
Philadelphia	7–12	8–12	10–9	11–9	10–10–1	10–9	—	12–8
Pittsburgh	3–16–1	10–9	6–12–1	10–10	6–14	12–7	8–12	—

=== Roster ===
1891 Pittsburgh Pirates
Roster
Pitchers: Mark Baldwin; Pud Galvin; Silver King; Harry Staley; Scott Stratton	Catchers: Tun Berger; Jocko Fields; Connie Mack; Doggie Miller; Infielders: Jake Beckley; Lou Bierbauer; Sam LaRocque; John Newell; Charlie Reilly; Frank Shugart; Ed Spurney	Outfielders: Pete Browning; Fred Carroll; Pop Corkhill; Ned Hanlon; Dan Lally; Al Maul; Piggy Ward	Manager: Bill McGunnigle; Ned Hanlon

== Player stats ==
=== Batting ===
==== Starters by position ====
Note: Pos = Position; G = Games played; AB = At bats; H = Hits; Avg. = Batting average; HR = Home runs; RBI = Runs batted in

Pos	Player	G	AB	H	Avg.	HR	RBI
C	Connie Mack	75	280	60	.214	0	29
1B	Jake Beckley	133	554	162	.292	4	73
2B	Lou Bierbauer	121	500	103	.206	1	47
SS	Frank Shugart	75	320	88	.275	3	33
3B	Charlie Reilly	114	415	91	.219	3	44
OF	Ned Hanlon	119	455	121	.266	0	60
OF	Fred Carroll	91	353	77	.218	4	48
OF	Pete Browning	50	203	59	.291	4	28

==== Other batters ====
Note: G = Games played; AB = At bats; H = Hits; Avg. = Batting average; HR = Home runs; RBI = Runs batted in

Player	G	AB	H	Avg.	HR	RBI
Doggie Miller	135	548	156	.285	4	57
Al Maul	47	149	28	.188	0	14
Pop Corkhill	41	145	33	.228	3	20
Dan Lally	41	143	32	.224	1	17
Tun Berger	43	134	32	.239	1	14
Jocko Fields	23	75	18	.240	0	5
Piggy Ward	6	18	6	.333	0	2
John Newell	5	18	2	.111	0	2
Ed Spurney	3	7	2	.286	0	0
Sam LaRocque	1	4	0	.000	0	0

=== Pitching ===
==== Starting pitchers ====
Note: G = Games pitched; IP = Innings pitched; W = Wins; L = Losses; ERA = Earned run average; SO = Strikeouts

Player	G	IP	W	L	ERA	SO
Mark Baldwin	53	437.2	21	28	2.76	197
Silver King	48	384.1	14	29	3.11	160
Pud Galvin	33	246.2	15	14	2.88	46
Harry Staley	9	71.2	4	5	2.89	25
Scott Stratton	2	18.1	0	2	2.45	5

==== Other pitchers ====
Note: G = Games pitched; IP = Innings pitched; W = Wins; L = Losses; ERA = Earned run average; SO = Strikeouts

Player	G	IP	W	L	ERA	SO
Al Maul	8	39.0	1	2	2.31	13
