= 1891 Boston Beaneaters season =

Boston Beaneaters season

1891 Boston Beaneaters
- National League champions
- League: National League
- Ballpark: South End Grounds
- City: Boston, Massachusetts
- Record: 87–51–2 (.630)
- League place: 1st
- Owner: Arthur Soden
- Manager: Frank Selee (2nd season)

The 1891 Boston Beaneaters season was the 21st season of the franchise. The team finished first in the National League with an 87–51–2 (.630) record. After trailing the Chicago Colts by seven games in early September, the Beaneaters won 25 of their last 29 games to finish first in the league, 3.5 games ahead of the Colts.

== Regular season ==
=== Season standings ===
National League
Team	W	L	Pct.	GB	Home	Road
Boston Beaneaters	87	51	.630	—	51‍–‍20	36‍–‍31
Chicago Colts	82	53	.607	3½	43‍–‍22	39‍–‍31
New York Giants	71	61	.538	13	39‍–‍28	32‍–‍33
Philadelphia Phillies	68	69	.496	18½	35‍–‍34	33‍–‍35
Cleveland Spiders	65	74	.468	22½	40‍–‍28	25‍–‍46
Brooklyn Grooms	61	76	.445	25½	41‍–‍31	20‍–‍45
Cincinnati Reds	56	81	.409	30½	26‍–‍41	30‍–‍40
Pittsburgh Pirates	55	80	.407	30½	32‍–‍34	23‍–‍46

=== Record vs. opponents ===
1891 National League record Sources:
Team	BSN	BRO	CHI	CIN	CLE	NYG	PHI	PIT
Boston	—	15–5	7–13	11–9	11–9	15–5–1	12–7	16–3–1
Brooklyn	5–15	—	7–13	9–10	11–9	8–11	12–8	9–10
Chicago	13–7	13–7	—	14–6	16–4	5–13–1	9–10	12–6–1
Cincinnati	9–11	10–9	6–14	—	7–13	5–13–1	9–11	10–10
Cleveland	9–11	9–11	4–16	13–7	—	6–13–1	10–10–1	14–6
New York	5–15–1	11–8	13–5–1	13–5–1	13–6–1	—	9–10	7–12
Philadelphia	7–12	8–12	10–9	11–9	10–10–1	10–9	—	12–8
Pittsburgh	3–16–1	10–9	6–12–1	10–10	6–14	12–7	8–12	—

=== Roster ===
1891 Boston Beaneaters
Roster
Pitchers: Tod Brynan; John Clarkson; Charlie Getzien; John Kiley; Kid Nichols; Cyclone Ryan; Harry Staley; Jim Sullivan	Catchers: Charlie Bennett; Charlie Ganzel; King Kelly; Fred Lake; Infielders: Herman Long; Billy Nash; Joe Quinn; Tommy Tucker	Outfielders: Steve Brodie; Joe Kelley; Bobby Lowe; George Rooks; Harry Stovey; Marty Sullivan	Manager: Frank Selee

== Player stats ==
=== Batting ===
==== Starters by position ====
Note: Pos = Position; G = Games played; AB = At bats; H = Hits; Avg. = Batting average; HR = Home runs; RBI = Runs batted in

Pos	Player	G	AB	H	Avg.	HR	RBI
C	Charlie Bennett	75	256	55	.215	5	39
1B	Tommy Tucker	140	548	148	.270	2	69
2B	Joe Quinn	124	508	122	.240	3	63
SS	Herman Long	139	577	163	.282	9	75
3B	Billy Nash	140	537	148	.276	5	95
OF	Harry Stovey	134	544	152	.279	16	95
OF	Bobby Lowe	125	497	129	.260	6	74
OF	Steve Brodie	133	523	136	.260	2	78

==== Other batters ====
Note: G = Games played; AB = At bats; H = Hits; Avg. = Batting average; HR = Home runs; RBI = Runs batted in

Player	G	AB	H	Avg.	HR	RBI
Charlie Ganzel	70	263	68	.259	1	29
Marty Sullivan	17	67	15	.224	2	7
King Kelly	16	52	12	.231	0	5
Joe Kelley	12	45	11	.244	0	3
George Rooks	5	16	2	.125	0	0
Fred Lake	5	7	1	.143	0	0

=== Pitching ===
==== Starting pitchers ====
Note: G = Games pitched; IP = Innings pitched; W = Wins; L = Losses; ERA = Earned run average; SO = Strikeouts

Player	G	IP	W	L	ERA	SO
John Clarkson	55	460.2	33	19	2.79	141
Kid Nichols	52	425.1	30	17	2.39	240
Harry Staley	31	252.1	20	8	2.50	114
Pretzels Getzien	11	89.0	4	5	3.84	29
John Kiley	1	8.0	0	1	6.75	1
Tod Brynan	1	1.0	0	1	54.00	0

==== Relief pitchers ====
Note: G = Games pitched; W = Wins; L = Losses; SV = Saves; ERA = Earned run average; SO = Strikeouts

Player	G	W	L	SV	ERA	SO
Cyclone Ryan	1	0	0	0	0.00	0
Tommy Tucker	1	0	0	0	9.00	0
Bobby Lowe	1	0	0	0	9.00	0
Jim Sullivan	1	0	0	0	81.00	0
