= Philadelphia Phillies all-time roster (G) =

List of baseball players

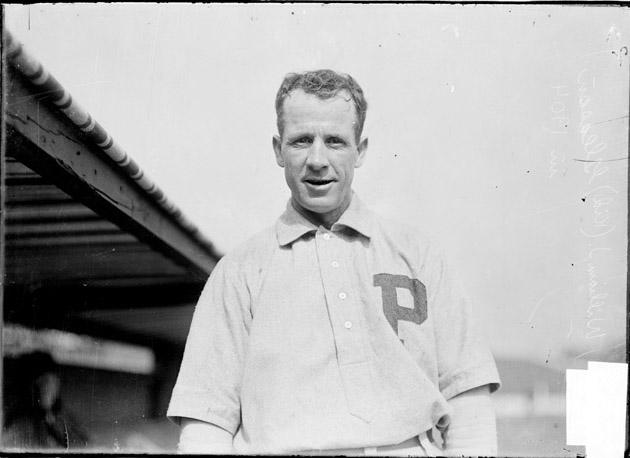
Kid Gleason set a Phillies single-season franchise record with 38 victories as a pitcher in 1890.

The Philadelphia Phillies are a Major League Baseball team based in Philadelphia, Pennsylvania. They are a member of the Eastern Division of Major League Baseball's National League. The team has played officially under two names since beginning play in 1883: the current moniker, as well as the "Quakers", which was used in conjunction with "Phillies" during the team's early history. The team was also known unofficially as the "Blue Jays" during the World War II era. Since the franchise's inception, 2,081 players have made an appearance in a competitive game for the team, whether as an offensive player (batting and baserunning) or a defensive player (fielding, pitching, or both).

Of those 2,081 Phillies, 82 have had surnames beginning with the letter G. No members of this list have been inducted into the Baseball Hall of Fame, but Dallas Green was elected to the Philadelphia Baseball Wall of Fame. In addition to being a Phillies pitcher in 1960, and again from 1964 to 1967, Green was named the Phillies manager in 1979 and led Philadelphia to the first World Series championship in franchise history in 1980. Though no Phillies on this list hold career franchise records, Kid Gleason does hold a single-season record; he won 38 games as a pitcher during the 1890 season before converting to a full-time second baseman later in his career.

Among the 50 batters in this list, second baseman Gid Gardner has the best batting average, at .667; he hit safely twice in three at-bats with the Phillies. Other players with an average above .300 include Dave Gallagher (.318 in one season), William Gallagher (.306 in one season), Mike Grady (.331 in four seasons), Billy Graulich (.308 in one season), and Emil Gross (.307 in one season). Tony González leads all batters on this list with 77 home runs and 438 runs batted in in nine seasons with Philadelphia.

Of this list's 33 pitchers, Geoff Geary has the best win–loss record by winning percentage; he won thirteen games and lost four in five seasons with the Phillies. Gleason's 78 career victories lead all pitchers in this list, as do his 70 losses. The earned run average (ERA) leader is left fielder Greg Gross, who made two pitching appearances during his ten-season career in Philadelphia, allowing no runs in five innings pitched; among pitchers, Gene Garber leads with a 2.68 ERA. Tommy Greene is one of the ten Phillies pitchers who have thrown a no-hitter, accomplishing the feat on May 23, 1991.

Key to symbols in player list(s)
| † or ‡ | Indicates a member of the National Baseball Hall of Fame and Museum; ‡ indicates that the Phillies are the player's primary team^{[H]} |
| § | Indicates a member of the Philadelphia Baseball Wall of Fame |
| * | Indicates a team record^{[R]} |
| (#) | A number following a player's name indicates that the number was retired by the Phillies in the player's honor. |
| Year | Italic text indicates that the player is a member of the Phillies' active (25-man) roster. |
| Position(s) | Indicates the player's primary position(s)^{[P]} |
| Notes | Statistics shown only for playing time with Phillies^{[S]} |
| Ref | References |

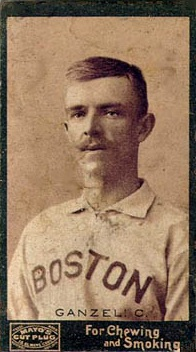
Charlie Ganzel hit three doubles in his two seasons with Philadelphia.

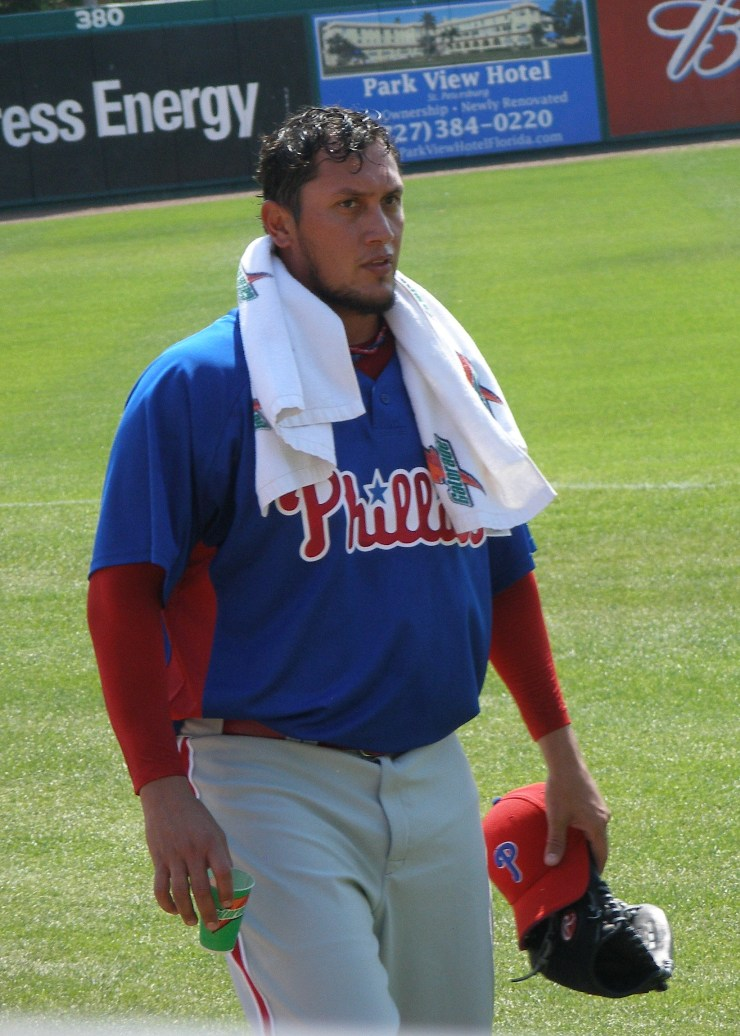
Freddy García earned one win in his only Phillies season after Philadelphia traded Gavin Floyd and Gio Gonzalez to the White Sox for his rights.

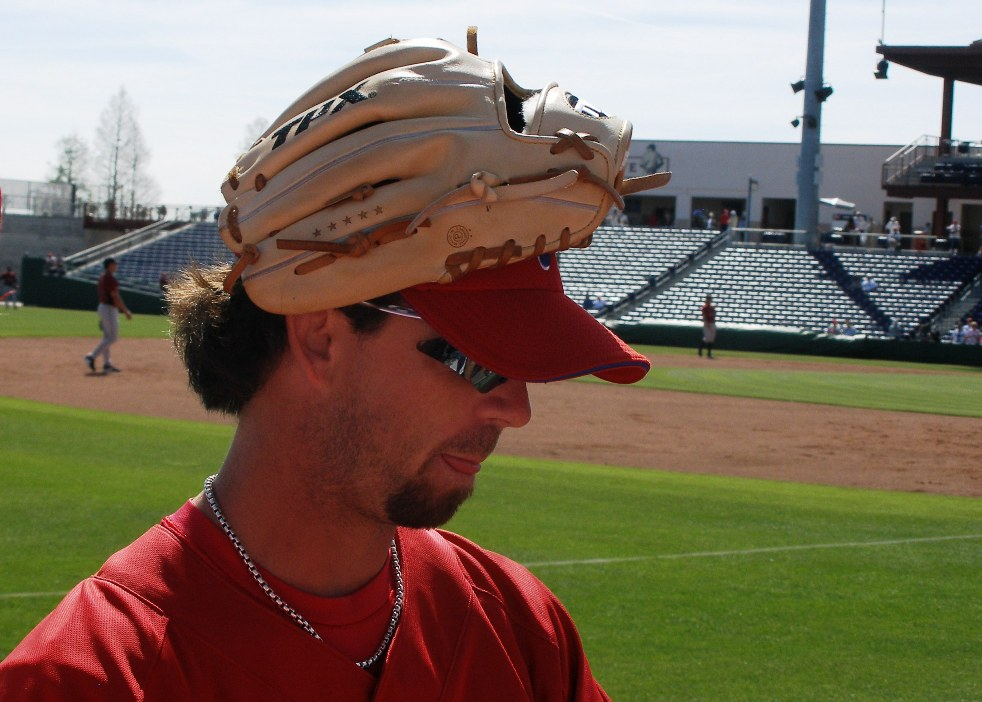
Geoff Geary won 13 games in 5 seasons with the Phillies.

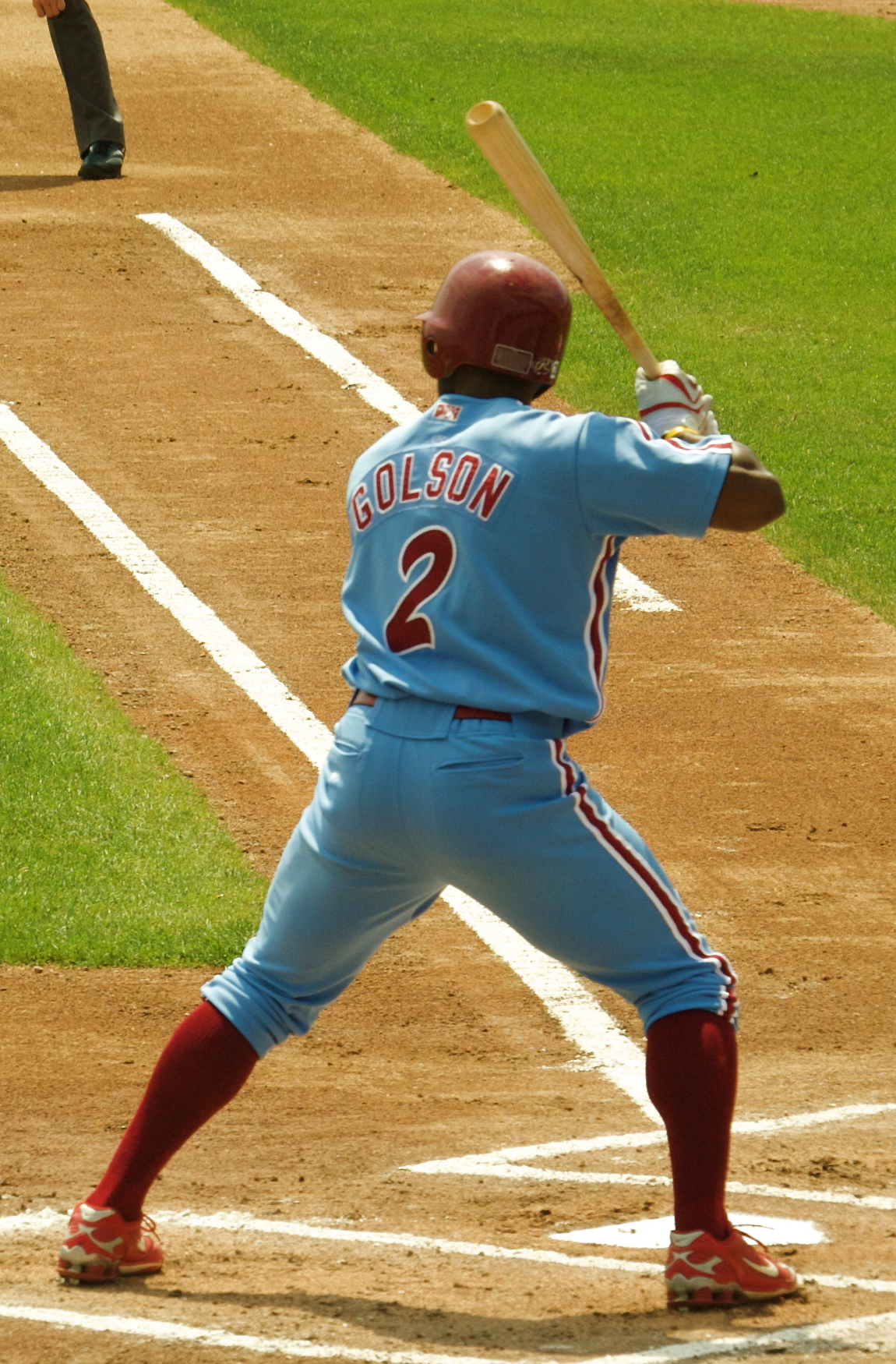
Outfielder Greg Golson scored two runs in his only year with Philadelphia.

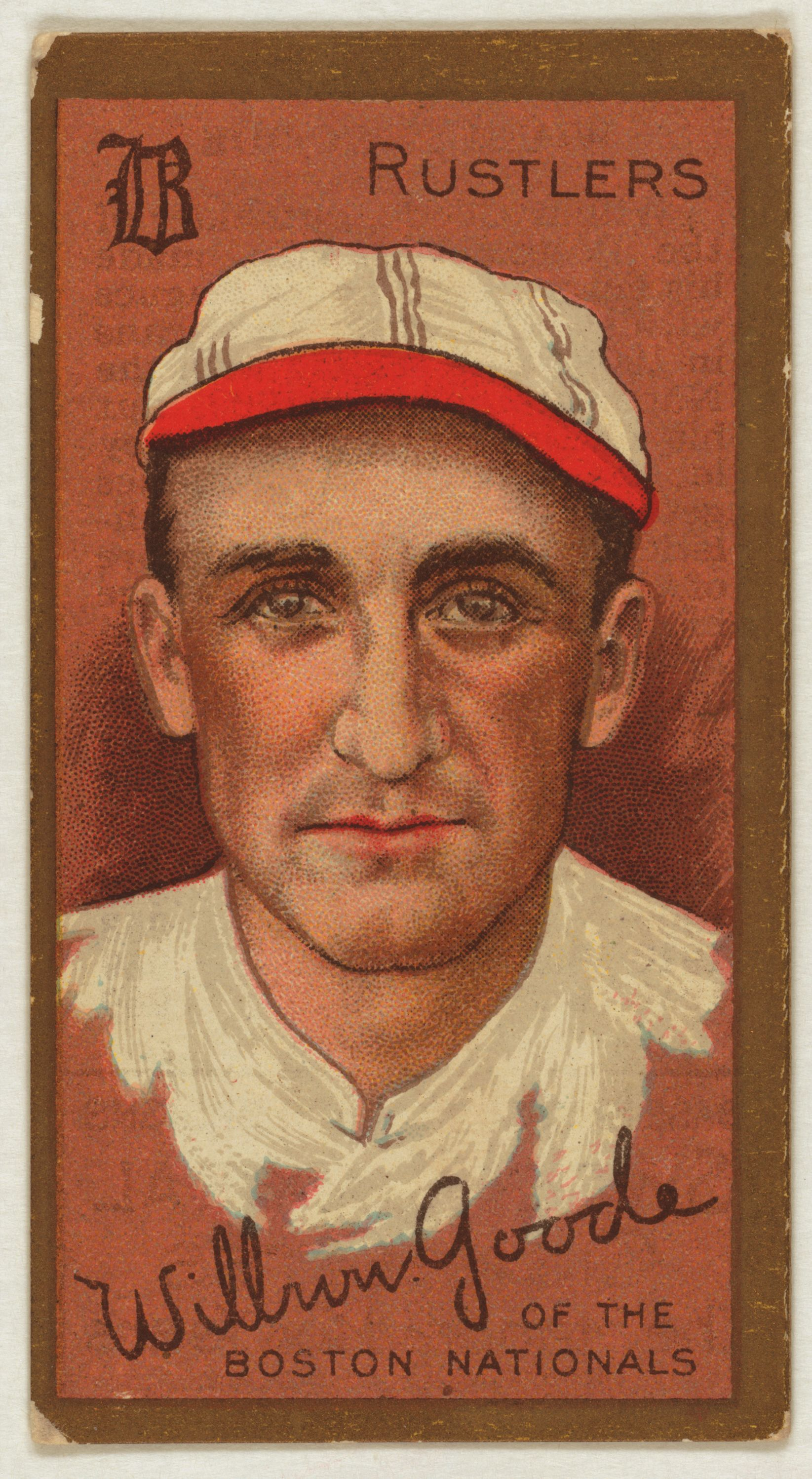
Wilbur Good hit one home run in his only Phillies season.

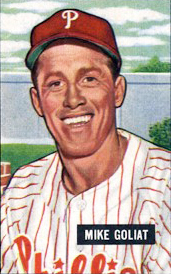
Mike Goliat hit 20 home runs during three seasons in Philadelphia.

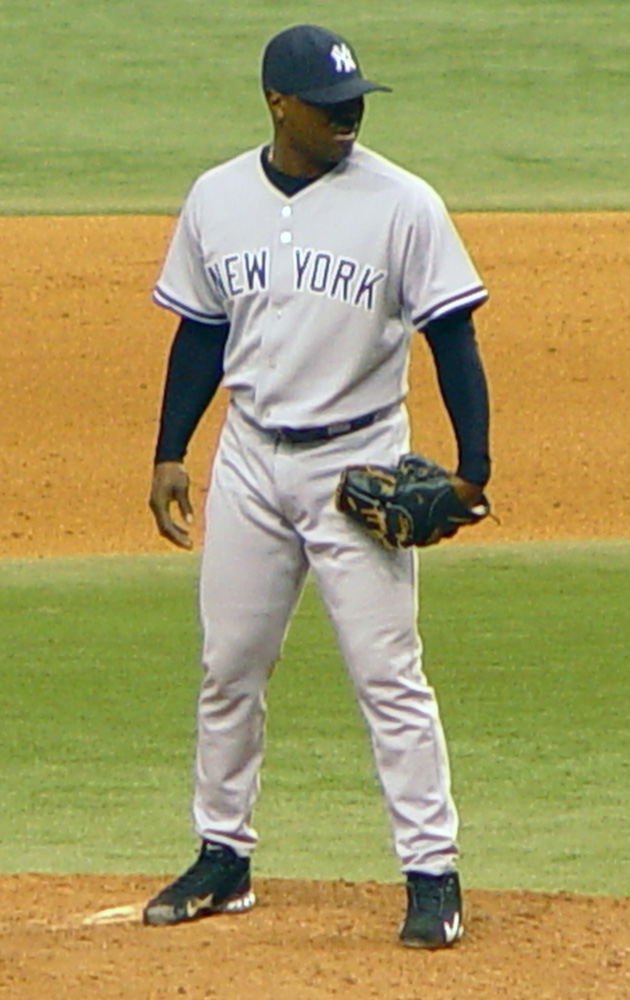
Tom Gordon served as the Phillies' closer or set-up man for most of his three seasons.

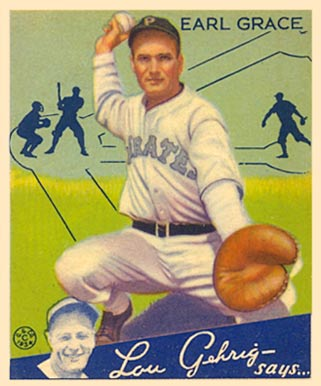
Catcher Earl Grace played for Philadelphia in 1936 and 1937.

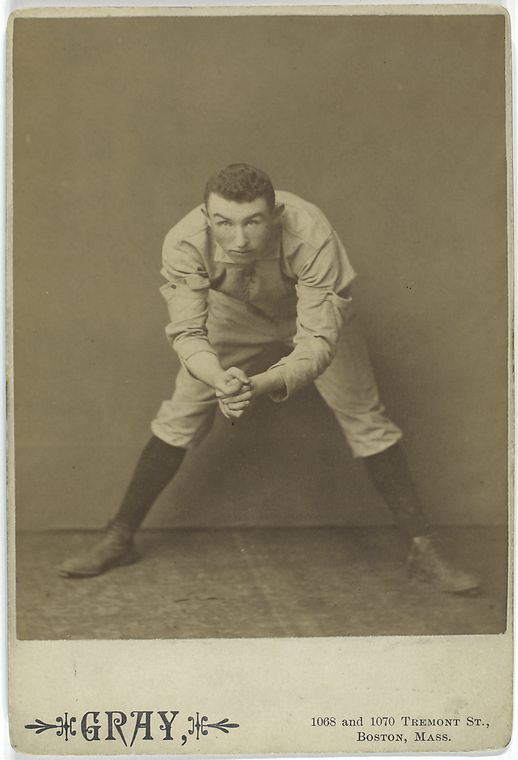
Tom Gunning, a catcher, played only one season for the Phillies.

List of players whose surnames begin with G, showing season(s) and position(s) played and selected statistics
| Name | Season(s) | Position(s) | Notes | Ref |
|---|---|---|---|---|
| Len Gabrielson | 1939 | First baseman | .222 batting average; 4 hits; 1 run batted in | |
| Bill Gallagher | 1883 | Center fielder | .000 batting average; 1 run scored; 8 plate appearances | |
| Dave Gallagher | 1995 | Right fielder Center fielder | .318 batting average; 1 home run; 12 runs batted in | |
| William Gallagher | 1896 | Shortstop | .306 batting average; 2 doubles; 6 runs batted in | |
| Bert Gallia | 1920 | Pitcher | 2–6 record; 4.50 earned run average; 35 strikeouts | |
| Oscar Gamble | 1970–1972 | Right fielder | .241 batting average; 8 home runs; 55 runs batted in | |
| Bob Gandy | 1916 | Center fielder | .000 batting average; 2 plate appearances; 1 strikeout | |
| Ron Gant | 1999–2000 | Left fielder | .257 batting average; 37 home runs; 115 runs batted in | |
| Charlie Ganzel | 1885–1886 | Catcher | .164 batting average; 3 doubles; 6 runs batted in | |
| Gene Garber | 1974–1978 | Pitcher | 33–22 record; 2.68 earned run average; 290 strikeouts | |
| Anderson García | 2007 | Pitcher | 13.50 earned run average; 1 run allowed; 2/3 innings pitched | |
| Freddy García | 2007 | Pitcher | 1–5 record; 5.90 earned run average; 50 strikeouts | |
| Kiko Garcia | 1983–1985 | Shortstop; Second baseman | .265 batting average; 2 home runs; 14 runs batted in | |
| Art Gardiner | 1923 | Pitcher | 1 hit; 1 walk; 0 innings pitched | |
| Gid Gardner | 1888 | Second baseman | .667 batting average; 2 singles; 1 run batted in | |
| Ned Garvin | 1896 | Pitcher | 0–1 record; 7.62 earned run average; 4 strikeouts | |
| Geoff Geary | 2003–2007 | Pitcher | 13–4 record; 3.94 earned run average; 173 strikeouts | |
| Phil Geier | 1896–1897 | Left fielder Second baseman | .272 batting average; 1 home run; 41 runs batted in | |
| Al Gerheauser | 1943–1944 | Pitcher | 18–35 record; 4.05 earned run average; 158 strikeouts | |
| Tony Ghelfi | 1983 | Pitcher | 1–1 record; 3.14 earned run average; 14 strikeouts | |
| Jeremy Giambi | 2002 | First baseman Right fielder | .244 batting average; 12 home runs; 28 runs batted in | |
| Charlie Gilbert | 1946–1947 | Right fielder | .240 batting average; 3 home runs; 27 runs batted in | |
| Sam Gillen | 1897 | Shortstop | .259 batting average; 10 doubles; 27 runs batted in | |
| Charlie Girard | 1910 | Pitcher | 1–2 record; 6.41 earned run average; 11 strikeouts | |
| Buck Gladmon | 1883 | Third baseman | .000 batting average; 1 run scored; 4 plate appearances | |
| Doug Glanville | 1998–2002; 2004 | Center fielder | .276 batting average; 49 home runs; 272 runs batted in | |
| Tommy Glaviano | 1953 | Third baseman Second baseman | .203 batting average; 3 home runs; 5 runs batted in | |
| Whitey Glazner | 1923–1924 | Pitcher | 14–30 record; 5.29 earned run average; 92 strikeouts | |
| Kid Gleason | 1888–1891; 1903–1908 | Second baseman Pitcher | .246 batting average; 228 runs batted in; 78–70 record; 3.39 earned run average | |
| Ross Gload | 2010–2011 | Right fielder First baseman | .270 batting average; 6 home runs; 30 runs batted in | |
| Al Glossop | 1942 | Second baseman | .225 batting average; 4 home runs; 40 runs batted in | |
| Bill Glynn | 1949 | First baseman | .200 batting average; 2 hits; 1 run batted in | |
| Billy Goeckel | 1899 | First baseman | .262 batting average; 3 doubles; 16 runs batted in | |
| Mike Goliat | 1949–1951 | Second baseman | .227 batting average; 20 home runs; 98 runs batted in | |
| Greg Golson | 2008 | Center fielder Right fielder | .000 batting average; 2 runs scored; 6 plate appearances | |
| Wayne Gomes | 1997–2001 | Pitcher | 27–21 record; 4.42 earned run average; 252 strikeouts | |
| Chile Gómez | 1935–1936 | Second baseman Shortstop | .231 batting average; 7 doubles; 44 runs batted in | |
| Rubén Gómez | 1959–1960; 1967 | Pitcher | 3–11 record; 5.63 earned run average; 70 strikeouts | |
| Alex Gonzalez | 2006 | First baseman Shortstop | .111 batting average; 4 hits; 1 run batted in | |
| Orlando González | 1978 | Right fielder | .192 batting average; 5 hits; 27 plate appearances | |
| Tony González | 1960–1968 | Center fielder | .295 batting average; 77 home runs; 438 runs batted in | |
| Wilbur Good | 1916 | Right fielder | .250 batting average; 1 home run; 15 runs batted in | |
| Glen Gorbous | 1955–1957 | Right fielder | .232 batting average; 4 home runs; 25 runs batted in | |
| Tom Gordon | 2006–2008 | Pitcher | 11–10 record; 4.19 earned run average; 126 strikeouts | |
| Howie Gorman | 1937–1938 | Right fielder | .200 batting average; 1 double; 1 run batted in | |
| Tom Gorman | 1986 | Pitcher | 0–1 record; 7.71 earned run average; 8 strikeouts | |
| Joe Gormley | 1891 | Pitcher | 0–1 record; 5.63 earned run average; 2 strikeouts | |
| Nick Goulish | 1944–1945 | Left fielder Right fielder | .250 batting average; 3 hits; 2 runs batted in | |
| Billy Grabarkewitz | 1973–1974 | Second baseman | .240 batting average; 3 home runs; 9 runs batted in | |
| Reggie Grabowski | 1932–1934 | Pitcher | 4–8 record; 5.73 earned run average; 37 strikeouts | |
| Earl Grace | 1936–1937 | Catcher | .230 batting average; 10 home runs; 61 runs batted in | |
| Mike Grace | 1995–1999 | Pitcher | 16–16 record; 4.96 earned run average; 156 strikeouts | |
| Mike Grady | 1894–1897 | Catcher | .331 batting average; 16 triples; 107 runs batted in | |
| Peaches Graham | 1912 | Catcher | .288 batting average; 1 home run; 4 runs batted in | |
| Wayne Graham | 1963 | Left fielder | .182 batting average; 4 hits; 25 plate appearances | |
| Joe Grahe | 1999 | Pitcher | 1–4 record; 3.86 earned run average; 16 strikeouts | |
| Eddie Grant | 1907–1910 | Third baseman | .258 batting average; 50 doubles; 155 runs batted in | |
| Jim Grant | 1923 | Pitcher | 13.50 earned run average; 4 walks; 4 innings pitched | |
| Lou Grasmick | 1948 | Pitcher | 7.20 earned run average; 2 strikeouts; 8 walks | |
| Don Grate | 1945–1946 | Pitcher | 1–1 record; 9.37 earned run average; 8 strikeouts | |
| Billy Graulich | 1891 | Catcher; First baseman | .308 batting average; 8 hits; 3 runs batted in | |
| Bill Gray | 1890–1891 | Catcher | .241 batting average; 8 doubles; 28 runs batted in | |
| Johnny Gray | 1958 | Pitcher | 4.15 earned run average; 10 strikeouts; 14 walks | |
| Dallas Green^{§} | 1960–1964; 1967 | Pitcher | 20–22 record; 4.28 earned run average; 261 strikeouts | |
| Tyler Green | 1993; 1995; 1997–1998 | Pitcher | 18–25 record; 5.16 earned run average; 263 strikeouts | |
| June Greene | 1928–1929 | Pitcher | 18.38 earned run average; 4 strikeouts; 9 walks | |
| Paddy Greene | 1902 | Third baseman | .169 batting average; 1 double; 1 run batted in | |
| Tommy Greene | 1990–1995 | Pitcher | 36–22 record; 4.02 earned run average; 429 strikeouts | |
| Jim Greengrass | 1955–1956 | Right fielder | .245 batting average; 17 home runs; 62 runs batted in | |
| Bob Greenwood | 1954–1955 | Pitcher | 1–2 record; 3.92 earned run average; 9 strikeouts | |
| John Grim | 1888 | Second baseman Right fielder | .143 batting average; 1 hit; 7 plate appearances | |
| Ray Grimes | 1926 | First baseman | .297 batting average; 5 doubles; 15 runs batted in | |
| Jason Grimsley | 1989–1991 | Pitcher | 5–12 record; 4.35 earned run average; 90 strikeouts | |
| Lee Grissom | 1941 | Pitcher | 2–13 record; 3.97 earned run average; 74 strikeouts | |
| Dick Groat | 1966–1967 | Shortstop | .254 batting average; 2 home runs; 54 runs batted in | |
| Emil Gross | 1883 | Catcher | .307 batting average; 1 home run; 25 runs batted in | |
| Greg Gross | 1979–1988 | Left fielder | .279 batting average; 1 home run; 128 runs batted in | |
| Kevin Gross | 1983–1988 | Pitcher | 60–66 record; 3.87 earned run average; 727 strikeouts | |
| Jeff Grotewold | 1992 | Catcher; Left fielder | .200 batting average; 3 home runs; 5 runs batted in | |
| Ad Gumbert | 1896 | Pitcher | 5–3 record; 4.54 earned run average; 14 strikeouts | |
| Tom Gunning | 1887 | Catcher | .260 batting average; 1 home runs; 16 runs batted in | |
| Jackie Gutiérrez | 1988 | Shortstop; Third baseman | .247 batting average; 4 doubles; 9 runs batted in | |

== Footnotes ==
Key

- ^{H} The National Baseball Hall of Fame and Museum determines which cap a player wears on their plaque, signifying "the team with which he made his most indelible mark". The Hall of Fame considers the player's wishes in making their decision, but the Hall makes the final decision as "it is important that the logo be emblematic of the historical accomplishments of that player’s career".
- ^{P} Players are listed at a position if they appeared in 30% of their games or more during their Phillies career, as defined by Baseball-Reference. Additional positions may be shown on the Baseball-Reference website by following each player's citation.
- ^{R} Franchise batting and pitching leaders are drawn from Baseball-Reference. A total of 1,500 plate appearances are needed to qualify for batting records, and 500 innings pitched or 50 decisions are required to qualify for pitching records.
- ^{S} Statistics are correct as of the end of the 2010 Major League Baseball season.
