= 1891 Cincinnati Reds season =

1891 Cincinnati Reds
- League: National League
- Ballpark: League Park
- City: Cincinnati
- Record: 56–81 (.409)
- League place: 7th
- Owners: Al Johnson & John T. Brush
- Manager: Tom Loftus

The 1891 Cincinnati Reds season was a season in American baseball. Shortly before the start of the baseball season, owner Al Johnson sold the club to John T. Brush. The team finished in a tie for last place in the National League with the Pittsburgh Pirates with a record of 56–81, 30.5 games behind the Boston Beaneaters.

== Regular season ==
After a fairly successful first season in the National League in 1890, the Reds looked to improve on their 77–55 record in 1891. The team brought back manager Tom Loftus for a second season.

Cincinnati had a new starting shortstop, as Germany Smith joined the team from the Brooklyn Bridegrooms. The light hitting Smith batted .191 with a homer and 47 RBI with the Bridegrooms in 1890. The Reds would also have third baseman Arlie Latham for the full season, as he had split the 1890 season between the Reds and Chicago Pirates of the Players' League. Latham had some big seasons with the St. Louis Browns of the American Association in the 1880s, leading the league in runs (152) in 1886, and stolen bases (109) in 1888. Veteran pitcher Old Hoss Radbourn joined the Reds after going 27–12 with a 3.31 with the Boston Reds of the Players' League in 1890. Radbourn had a huge season back in 1884 with the Providence Grays, going 59–12 with a 1.38 ERA, 73 complete games and striking out 441 hitters.

Bug Holliday rebounded from a substandard 1890 season by leading the team with a .319 average, nine homers and 84 RBI. Jocko Halligan, who joined the Reds in July, had a .312 average with three homers and 44 RBI in only 61 games. Latham hit .272 with seven homers and 53 RBI, as well as leading the team with 87 stolen bases. Tony Mullane led the pitching staff with 23 victories, while Billy Rhines finished the year 17–24 with a team best 2.87 ERA and 138 strikeouts.

=== Season summary ===
The Reds started the season off losing four games in a row to their Ohio rivals, the Cleveland Spiders, which included a 23–4 loss. That set the tone for the season, as wins were scarce, as Cincinnati fell into the National League cellar. The Reds battled back, finishing off the season with a seven-game winning streak to move into a virtual tie with the Pittsburgh Pirates for seventh place. Both teams finished 30½ games behind the pennant winning Boston Beaneaters, but the Reds had a slightly better winning percentage by virtue of having played two more games than the Pirates.

=== Season standings ===
National League
Team	W	L	Pct.	GB	Home	Road
Boston Beaneaters	87	51	.630	—	51‍–‍20	36‍–‍31
Chicago Colts	82	53	.607	3½	43‍–‍22	39‍–‍31
New York Giants	71	61	.538	13	39‍–‍28	32‍–‍33
Philadelphia Phillies	68	69	.496	18½	35‍–‍34	33‍–‍35
Cleveland Spiders	65	74	.468	22½	40‍–‍28	25‍–‍46
Brooklyn Grooms	61	76	.445	25½	41‍–‍31	20‍–‍45
Cincinnati Reds	56	81	.409	30½	26‍–‍41	30‍–‍40
Pittsburgh Pirates	55	80	.407	30½	32‍–‍34	23‍–‍46

=== Record vs. opponents ===
1891 National League record Sources:
Team	BSN	BRO	CHI	CIN	CLE	NYG	PHI	PIT
Boston	—	15–5	7–13	11–9	11–9	15–5–1	12–7	16–3–1
Brooklyn	5–15	—	7–13	9–10	11–9	8–11	12–8	9–10
Chicago	13–7	13–7	—	14–6	16–4	5–13–1	9–10	12–6–1
Cincinnati	9–11	10–9	6–14	—	7–13	5–13–1	9–11	10–10
Cleveland	9–11	9–11	4–16	13–7	—	6–13–1	10–10–1	14–6
New York	5–15–1	11–8	13–5–1	13–5–1	13–6–1	—	9–10	7–12
Philadelphia	7–12	8–12	10–9	11–9	10–10–1	10–9	—	12–8
Pittsburgh	3–16–1	10–9	6–12–1	10–10	6–14	12–7	8–12	—

=== Game log ===
Legend
Reds Win	Reds Loss	Game Tied/Postponed

1891 Game Log: 56–81 (Home: 26–41; Away: 30–40)
April: 2–6 (Home: 2–6; Away: 0–0)

#	Date	Opponent	Score	Stadium	Attendance	Record	Streak
1	April 22	Spiders	3–6	League Park	4,003	0-1	L1
2	April 23	Spiders	3–6	League Park	2,457	0-2	L2
3	April 24	Spiders	5–6	League Park	1,200	0-3	L3
4	April 25	Spiders	7–23	League Park	1,100	0-4	L4
5	April 27	Colts	1–0	League Park	650	1-4	W1
6	April 28	Colts	6–11	League Park	1,450	1-5	L1
7	April 29	Colts	4–1	League Park	1,300	2-5	W1
8	April 30	Colts	4–7	League Park	500	2-6	L1

May: 10–15 (Home: 9–10; Away: 1–5)

#	Date	Opponent	Score	Stadium	Attendance	Record	Streak
9	May 1	@ Spiders	3–12	League Park	9,000	2-7	L2
10	May 2	@ Spiders	7–4	League Park	3,000	3-7	W1
11	May 4	@ Spiders	4–9	League Park	1,000	3-8	L1
12	May 5	@ Spiders	10–15	League Park	800	3-9	L2
13	May 6	Pirates	10–5	League Park	724	4-9	W1
14	May 7	Pirates	2–4	League Park	1,351	4-10	L1
15	May 8	Pirates	3–6	League Park	1,348	4-11	L2
16	May 9	Pirates	7–2	League Park	1,735	5-11	W1
17	May 11	Grooms	5–7	League Park	846	5-12	L1
18	May 12	Grooms	7–18	League Park	975	5-13	L2
19	May 13	Grooms	1–2	League Park	850	5-14	L3
20	May 14	Grooms	4–0	League Park	1,300	6-14	W1
21	May 15	Beaneaters	3–6	League Park	1,000	6-15	L1
22	May 16	Beaneaters	8–3	League Park	2,400	7-15	W1
23	May 18	Beaneaters	3–2	League Park	1,988	8-15	W2
24	May 19	Beaneaters	16–7	League Park	1,811	9-15	W3
25	May 21	Giants	4–6	League Park	1,200	9-16	L1
26	May 22	Giants	8–3	League Park	1,376	10-16	W1
27	May 23	Giants	2–7	League Park	1,581	10-17	L1
28	May 25	Phillies	4–2	League Park	847	11-17	W1
29	May 26	Phillies	1–5	League Park	820	11-18	L1
30	May 27	Phillies	16–6	League Park	856	12-18	W1
31	May 28	Phillies	5–6	League Park	200	12-19	L1
32	May 30 1	@ Beaneaters	2–7	South End Grounds	3,100	12-20	L2
33	May 30 2	@ Beaneaters	2–6	South End Grounds	10,908	12-21	L3

June: 10–14 (Home: 2–1; Away: 8–13)

#	Date	Opponent	Score	Stadium	Attendance	Record	Streak
34	June 1	@ Beaneaters	5–2	South End Grounds	1,721	13-21	W1
35	June 2	@ Beaneaters	10–8	South End Grounds	1,816	14-21	W2
36	June 3	@ Giants	1–11	Polo Grounds	1,745	14-22	L1
37	June 4	@ Giants	2–4	Polo Grounds	1,300	14-23	L2
38	June 5	@ Giants	2–9	Polo Grounds	1,595	14-24	L3
39	June 6	@ Giants	0–4	Polo Grounds	4,692	14-25	L4
40	June 8	@ Phillies	6–3	Philadelphia Base Ball Grounds	3,302	15-25	W1
41	June 9	@ Phillies	9–3	Philadelphia Base Ball Grounds	2,864	16-25	W2
42	June 10	@ Phillies	3–1	Philadelphia Base Ball Grounds	2,552	17-25	W3
43	June 11	@ Phillies	2–1	Philadelphia Base Ball Grounds	2,576	18-25	W4
44	June 12	@ Grooms	2–7	Eastern Park	2,092	18-26	L1
45	June 13	@ Grooms	1–11	Eastern Park	5,281	18-27	L2
46	June 15	@ Grooms	13–9	Eastern Park	1,245	19-27	W1
47	June 16	@ Grooms	3–6	Eastern Park	890	19-28	L1
-	June 17	@ Pirates	Postponed (rain); Makeup: June 22				
48	June 18	@ Pirates	4–3	Exposition Park	1,340	20-28	W1
-	June 19	@ Pirates	Postponed (rain); Makeup: July 29				
49	June 20	@ Pirates	8–13	Exposition Park	1,623	20-29	L1
50	June 22	@ Pirates	3–4	Exposition Park	1,100	20-30	L2
51	June 23	@ Colts	2–5	South Side Park	2,000	20-31	L3
52	June 24	@ Colts	2–8	South Side Park	N/A	20-32	L4
53	June 25	@ Colts	2–4	South Side Park	2,100	20-33	L5
54	June 26	@ Colts	7–11	South Side Park	1,900	20-34	L6
55	June 27	Spiders	4–6	League Park	1,541	20-35	L7
56	June 29	Spiders	3–1	League Park	958	21-35	W1
57	June 30	Spiders	4–3	League Park	969	22-35	W2

July: 13–13 (Home: 7–9; Away: 6–4)

#	Date	Opponent	Score	Stadium	Attendance	Record	Streak
58	July 1	Pirates	4–6	League Park	1,116	22-36	L1
59	July 2	Pirates	0–1	League Park	1,088	22-37	L2
60	July 3	Pirates	6–5	League Park	1,091	23-37	W1
61	July 4 1	Giants	2–3	League Park	3,722	23-38	L1
62	July 4 2	Giants	4–5	League Park	5,113	23-39	L2
63	July 6	Giants	2–1	League Park	1,640	24-39	W1
64	July 8	Grooms	9–5	League Park	1,532	25-39	W2
65	July 9	Grooms	11–6	League Park	1,545	26-39	W3
66	July 10	Beaneaters	2–5	League Park	1,603	26-40	L1
67	July 11	Beaneaters	7–3	League Park	2,934	27-40	W1
68	July 13	Beaneaters	0–6	League Park	1,525	27-41	L1
69	July 14	Phillies	1–9	League Park	1,322	27-42	L2
70	July 15	Phillies	6–4	League Park	1,194	28-42	W1
71	July 16	Phillies	4–2	League Park	1,646	29-42	W2
72	July 17	@ Spiders	8–12	League Park	1,200	29-43	L1
73	July 18	@ Spiders	7–6	League Park	1,250	30-43	W1
74	July 20	@ Spiders	2–1	League Park	1,250	31-43	W2
75	July 22	@ Colts	8–16	South Side Park	1,600	31-44	L1
76	July 23	@ Colts	4–2	South Side Park	1,400	32-44	W1
77	July 24	@ Colts	7–11	South Side Park	3,400	32-45	L1
78	July 25	@ Pirates	1–0	Exposition Park	1,587	33-45	W1
79	July 27	@ Pirates	1–10	Exposition Park	1,250	33-46	L1
80	July 28	@ Pirates	4–0	Exposition Park	775	34-46	W1
81	July 29	@ Pirates	8–2	Exposition Park	1,127	35-46	W2
82	July 30	Colts	0–1	League Park	2,069	35-47	L1
83	July 31	Colts	4–8	League Park	1,864	35-48	L2

August: 7–17 (Home: 4–10; Away: 3–7)

#	Date	Opponent	Score	Stadium	Attendance	Record	Streak
84	August 1	Colts	4–7	League Park	1,805	35-49	L3
85	August 3	@ Beaneaters	7–0	South End Grounds	2,582	36-49	W1
86	August 4	@ Beaneaters	6–10	South End Grounds	2,009	36-50	L1
87	August 5	@ Beaneaters	1–4	South End Grounds	2,383	36-51	L2
88	August 6	@ Phillies	1–4	Philadelphia Base Ball Grounds	2,897	36-52	L3
89	August 7	@ Phillies	5–13	Philadelphia Base Ball Grounds	2,898	36-53	L4
90	August 8	@ Phillies	1–9	Philadelphia Base Ball Grounds	7,439	36-54	L5
91	August 10	@ Grooms	8–6	Eastern Park	1,222	37-54	W1
92	August 11	@ Grooms	6–8	Eastern Park	821	37-55	L1
-	August 12	@ Grooms	Postponed (rain); Makeup: September 8				
93	August 13	@ Giants	7–4	Polo Grounds	1,695	38-55	W1
94	August 14	@ Giants	1–2	Polo Grounds	1,427	38-56	L1
95	August 15	@ Giants	4–4	Polo Grounds	4,138	38-56	L1
96	August 17	Spiders	3–2	League Park	500	39-56	W1
97	August 18	Spiders	2–6	League Park	961	39-57	L1
98	August 19	Spiders	3–4	League Park	N/A	39-58	L2
99	August 20	Pirates	1–2	League Park	708	39-59	L3
100	August 21	Pirates	0–2	League Park	696	39-60	L4
101	August 22	Pirates	1–2	League Park	200	39-61	L5
102	August 24	Giants	2–3	League Park	861	39-62	L6
103	August 25	Giants	12–4	League Park	1,086	40-62	W1
104	August 26	Giants	1–6	League Park	1,136	40-63	L1
105	August 27	Grooms	10–3	League Park	650	41-63	W1
106	August 28	Grooms	8–1	League Park	1,056	42-63	W2
107	August 29	Grooms	4–7	League Park	1,549	42-64	L1
-	August 30	Beaneaters	Postponed (unknown reason); Makeup: August 31				
108	August 31	Beaneaters	3–5	League Park	1,412	42-65	L2

September/October: 14–16 (Home: 2–5; Away: 12–11)

#	Date	Opponent	Score	Stadium	Attendance	Record	Streak
109	September 1	Beaneaters	4–1	League Park	889	43-65	W1
110	September 2	Beaneaters	7–0	League Park	1,106	44-65	W2
111	September 3	Phillies	8–13	League Park	620	44-66	L1
-	September 4	Phillies	Postponed (rain; site change); Makeup: September 19				
112	September 5	Phillies	3–5	League Park	989	44-67	L2
113	September 7 1	@ Giants	8–7	Polo Grounds	1,416	45-67	W1
114	September 7 2	@ Giants	0–6	Polo Grounds	7,209	45-68	L1
-	September 8	@ Giants	Postponed (unknown reason); Makeup: September 7				
115	September 8	@ Grooms	6–4	Eastern Park	759	46-68	W1
116	September 9	@ Giants	3–7	Polo Grounds	1,152	46-69	L1
117	September 10	@ Beaneaters	6–18	South End Grounds	1,668	46-70	L2
118	September 11	@ Beaneaters	3–5	South End Grounds	1,597	46-71	L3
119	September 12	@ Beaneaters	0–9	South End Grounds	3,116	46-72	L4
120	September 14	@ Grooms	11–5	Eastern Park	710	47-72	W1
-	September 15	@ Grooms	Postponed (rain); Makeup: September 16				
121	September 16 1	@ Grooms	0–1	Eastern Park	N/A	47-73	L1
122	September 16 2	@ Grooms	8–4	Eastern Park	1,292	48-73	W1
123	September 17	@ Phillies	4–6	Philadelphia Base Ball Grounds	1,491	48-75	L1
124	September 18	@ Phillies	6–11	Philadelphia Base Ball Grounds	1,605	48-76	L2
125	September 19 1	@ Phillies	8–5	Philadelphia Base Ball Grounds	N/A	49-75	W1
126	September 19 2	@ Phillies	6–8	Philadelphia Base Ball Grounds	5,455	49-76	L1
127	September 21	Colts	4–5	League Park	884	49-77	L2
128	September 22	Colts	1–4	League Park	906	49-78	L3
129	September 23	Colts	0–9	League Park	800	49-79	L4
130	September 24	@ Spiders	1–5	League Park	1,350	49-80	L5
131	September 25	@ Spiders	8–16	League Park	1,200	49-81	L6
132	September 26	@ Spiders	7–4	League Park	1,800	50-81	W1
133	September 28	@ Pirates	7–5	Exposition Park	1,782	51-81	W2
134	September 29	@ Pirates	7–6	Exposition Park	1,400	52-81	W3
135	September 30	@ Pirates	2–1	Exposition Park	1,147	53-81	W4
136	October 1	@ Colts	6–1	South Side Park	2,000	54-81	W5
137	October 2	@ Colts	17–16	South Side Park	1,200	55-81	W6
138	October 3	@ Colts	15–9	South Side Park	1,000	56-81	W7

=== Roster ===
1891 Cincinnati Reds
Roster
Pitchers: Ed Crane; Jesse Duryea; Tony Mullane; Old Hoss Radbourn; Billy Rhines; Clarence Stephens	Catchers: Bob Clark; Jerry Harrington; Infielders: Jim Keenan; Arlie Latham; Bid McPhee; John Reilly; Germany Smith	Outfielders: Pete Browning; Pop Corkhill; Jim Curtiss; Frank Foreman; Jocko Halligan; Bug Holliday; Lefty Marr; Mike Slattery	Manager: Tom Loftus

== Player stats ==
=== Batting ===
==== Starters by position ====
Note: Pos = Position; G = Games played; AB = At bats; H = Hits; Avg. = Batting average; HR = Home runs; RBI = Runs batted in

Pos	Player	G	AB	H	Avg.	HR	RBI
C	Jerry Harrington	92	333	76	.228	2	41
1B	John Reilly	135	546	132	.242	4	64
2B	Bid McPhee	138	562	144	.256	6	38
SS	Germany Smith	138	512	103	.201	3	53
3B	Arlie Latham	135	533	145	.272	7	53
OF	Jocko Halligan	61	247	77	.312	3	44
OF	Lefty Marr	72	286	74	.259	0	32
OF	Bug Holliday	111	442	141	.319	9	84

==== Other batters ====
Note: G = Games played; AB = At bats; H = Hits; Avg. = Batting average; HR = Home runs; RBI = Runs batted in

Player	G	AB	H	Avg.	HR	RBI
Jim Keenan	75	252	51	.202	4	33
Pete Browning	55	216	74	.343	0	33
Mike Slattery	41	158	33	.209	1	16
Jim Curtiss	27	108	29	.269	1	13
Bob Clark	16	54	6	.111	0	3
Pop Corkhill	1	4	0	.000	0	0
Frank Foreman	1	4	1	.250	0	0

=== Pitching ===
==== Starting pitchers ====
Note: G = Games pitched; IP = Innings pitched; W = Wins; L = Losses; ERA = Earned run average; SO = Strikeouts

Player	G	IP	W	L	ERA	SO
Tony Mullane	51	426.1	23	26	3.23	124
Billy Rhines	48	372.2	17	24	2.87	138
Old Hoss Radbourn	26	218.0	11	13	4.25	54
Ed Crane	15	116.2	4	8	4.09	51
Jesse Duryea	10	77.0	1	9	5.38	23
Clarence Stephens	1	8.0	0	1	7.88	3
