= 1891 New York Giants season =

1891 New York Giants
- League: National League
- Ballpark: Polo Grounds
- City: New York City
- Record: 71–61 (.538)
- League place: 3rd
- Owner: John B. Day
- Manager: Jim Mutrie

The 1891 New York Giants season was the franchise's ninth season. The team finished in third place in the National League with a 71–61 record, 13 games behind the Boston Beaneaters.

== Regular season ==
=== Season standings ===
National League
Team	W	L	Pct.	GB	Home	Road
Boston Beaneaters	87	51	.630	—	51‍–‍20	36‍–‍31
Chicago Colts	82	53	.607	3½	43‍–‍22	39‍–‍31
New York Giants	71	61	.538	13	39‍–‍28	32‍–‍33
Philadelphia Phillies	68	69	.496	18½	35‍–‍34	33‍–‍35
Cleveland Spiders	65	74	.468	22½	40‍–‍28	25‍–‍46
Brooklyn Grooms	61	76	.445	25½	41‍–‍31	20‍–‍45
Cincinnati Reds	56	81	.409	30½	26‍–‍41	30‍–‍40
Pittsburgh Pirates	55	80	.407	30½	32‍–‍34	23‍–‍46

=== Record vs. opponents ===
1891 National League record Sources:
Team	BSN	BRO	CHI	CIN	CLE	NYG	PHI	PIT
Boston	—	15–5	7–13	11–9	11–9	15–5–1	12–7	16–3–1
Brooklyn	5–15	—	7–13	9–10	11–9	8–11	12–8	9–10
Chicago	13–7	13–7	—	14–6	16–4	5–13–1	9–10	12–6–1
Cincinnati	9–11	10–9	6–14	—	7–13	5–13–1	9–11	10–10
Cleveland	9–11	9–11	4–16	13–7	—	6–13–1	10–10–1	14–6
New York	5–15–1	11–8	13–5–1	13–5–1	13–6–1	—	9–10	7–12
Philadelphia	7–12	8–12	10–9	11–9	10–10–1	10–9	—	12–8
Pittsburgh	3–16–1	10–9	6–12–1	10–10	6–14	12–7	8–12	—

=== Roster ===
1891 New York Giants
Roster
Pitchers: Bob Barr; Dad Clarkson; Roscoe Coughlin; Andy Dunning; John Ewing; Tim Keefe; Amos Rusie; Jack Sharrott; Mike Sullivan; Jack Taylor; Mickey Welch	Catchers: Dick Buckley; Buster Burrell; Artie Clarke; Infielders: Charley Bassett; Roger Connor; Jerry Denny; Buck Ewing; Jack Glasscock; Danny Richardson; Lew Whistler	Outfielders: George Gore; Jim O'Rourke; Mike Tiernan	Manager: Jim Mutrie

== Player stats ==
=== Batting ===
==== Starters by position ====
Note: Pos = Position; G = Games played; AB = At bats; H = Hits; Avg. = Batting average; HR = Home runs; RBI = Runs batted in

Pos	Player	G	AB	H	Avg.	HR	RBI
C	Dick Buckley	75	253	55	.217	4	31
1B	Roger Connor	129	479	139	.290	7	94
2B	Danny Richardson	123	516	139	.269	4	51
SS	Jack Glasscock	97	369	89	.241	0	55
3B	Charley Bassett	130	524	136	.260	4	68
OF	George Gore	130	528	150	.284	2	48
OF	Jim O'Rourke	136	555	164	.295	5	95
OF	Mike Tiernan	134	542	166	.306	16	73

==== Other batters ====
Note: G = Games played; AB = At bats; H = Hits; Avg. = Batting average; HR = Home runs; RBI = Runs batted in

Player	G	AB	H	Avg.	HR	RBI
Lew Whistler	72	265	65	.245	3	38
Artie Clarke	48	174	33	.190	0	21
Buster Burrell	15	53	5	.094	0	1
Buck Ewing	14	49	17	.347	0	18
Jerry Denny	4	16	4	.250	0	1

=== Pitching ===
==== Starting pitchers ====
Note: G = Games pitched; IP = Innings pitched; W = Wins; L = Losses; ERA = Earned run average; SO = Strikeouts

Player	G	IP	W	L	ERA	SO
Amos Rusie	61	500.1	33	20	2.55	337
John Ewing	33	269.1	21	8	2.27	138
Jack Sharrott	10	69.1	5	5	2.60	41
Roscoe Coughlin	8	61.0	3	4	3.84	22
Tim Keefe	8	55.0	2	5	5.24	30
Bob Barr	5	27.0	0	4	5.33	11
Mike Sullivan	3	24.0	1	2	3.38	11
Jack Taylor	1	8.0	0	1	1.13	3
Andy Dunning	1	2.0	0	1	4.50	1

==== Other pitchers ====
Note: G = Games pitched; IP = Innings pitched; W = Wins; L = Losses; ERA = Earned run average; SO = Strikeouts

Player	G	IP	W	L	ERA	SO
Mickey Welch	22	160.0	5	9	4.28	46
Dad Clarkson	5	28.0	1	2	2.89	11
