= Ed Mayer =

Ed Mayer may refer to:

- Ed Mayer (pitcher) (1931–2015), American baseball player
- Ed Mayer (third baseman) (1865–1946), American baseball player
