= 1891 Chicago Colts season =

1891 Chicago Colts
- League: National League
- Ballpark: West Side Park (since 1885); South Side Park
- City: Chicago
- Record: 82–53 (.607)
- League place: 2nd
- Owner: Albert Spalding
- Manager: Cap Anson

The 1891 Chicago Colts season was the 20th season of the Chicago Colts franchise, the 16th in the National League and the first at South Side Park. The Colts finished second in the National League with a record of 82–53.

== Regular season ==
=== Season standings ===
National League
Team	W	L	Pct.	GB	Home	Road
Boston Beaneaters	87	51	.630	—	51‍–‍20	36‍–‍31
Chicago Colts	82	53	.607	3½	43‍–‍22	39‍–‍31
New York Giants	71	61	.538	13	39‍–‍28	32‍–‍33
Philadelphia Phillies	68	69	.496	18½	35‍–‍34	33‍–‍35
Cleveland Spiders	65	74	.468	22½	40‍–‍28	25‍–‍46
Brooklyn Grooms	61	76	.445	25½	41‍–‍31	20‍–‍45
Cincinnati Reds	56	81	.409	30½	26‍–‍41	30‍–‍40
Pittsburgh Pirates	55	80	.407	30½	32‍–‍34	23‍–‍46

=== Record vs. opponents ===
1891 National League record Sources:
Team	BSN	BRO	CHI	CIN	CLE	NYG	PHI	PIT
Boston	—	15–5	7–13	11–9	11–9	15–5–1	12–7	16–3–1
Brooklyn	5–15	—	7–13	9–10	11–9	8–11	12–8	9–10
Chicago	13–7	13–7	—	14–6	16–4	5–13–1	9–10	12–6–1
Cincinnati	9–11	10–9	6–14	—	7–13	5–13–1	9–11	10–10
Cleveland	9–11	9–11	4–16	13–7	—	6–13–1	10–10–1	14–6
New York	5–15–1	11–8	13–5–1	13–5–1	13–6–1	—	9–10	7–12
Philadelphia	7–12	8–12	10–9	11–9	10–10–1	10–9	—	12–8
Pittsburgh	3–16–1	10–9	6–12–1	10–10	6–14	12–7	8–12	—

== Roster ==
1891 Chicago Colts
Roster
Pitchers: Ad Gumbert; Bill Hutchison; Pat Luby; George Nicol; Ed Stein; Tom Vickery	Catchers: Bill Bowman; Marty Honan; Malachi Kittridge; Bill Merritt; Tom Nagle; Pop Schriver; Infielders: Cap Anson; Tom Burns; Jimmy Cooney; Bill Dahlen; Fred Pfeffer	Outfielders: Cliff Carroll; Elmer Foster; Jimmy Ryan; Walt Wilmot	Manager: Cap Anson

== Player stats ==
=== Batting ===
==== Starters by position ====
Note: Pos = Position; G = Games played; AB = At bats; H = Hits; Avg. = Batting average; HR = Home runs; RBI = Runs batted in

Pos	Player	G	AB	H	Avg.	HR	RBI
C	Malachi Kittridge	79	296	62	.209	2	27
1B	Cap Anson	136	540	157	.291	8	120
2B	Fred Pfeffer	137	498	123	.247	7	77
SS	Jimmy Cooney	118	465	114	.245	0	42
3B	Bill Dahlen	135	549	143	.260	9	76
OF	Walt Wilmot	121	498	137	.275	11	71
OF	Cliff Carroll	130	515	132	.256	7	80
OF	Jimmy Ryan	118	505	140	.277	9	66

==== Other batters ====
Note: G = Games played; AB = At bats; H = Hits; Avg. = Batting average; HR = Home runs; RBI = Runs batted in

Player	G	AB	H	Avg.	HR	RBI
Tom Burns	59	243	55	.226	1	17
Pop Schriver	27	90	30	.333	1	21
Bill Bowman	15	45	4	.089	0	5
Bill Merritt	11	42	9	.214	0	4
Tom Nagle	8	25	3	.120	0	1
Elmer Foster	4	16	3	.188	1	1
Marty Honan	5	12	2	.167	0	3

=== Pitching ===
==== Starting pitchers ====
Note: G = Games pitched; IP = Innings pitched; W = Wins; L = Losses; ERA = Earned run average; SO = Strikeouts

Player	G	IP	W	L	ERA	SO
Bill Hutchison	66	561.0	44	19	2.81	261
Ad Gumbert	32	256.1	17	11	3.58	73
Pat Luby	30	206.0	8	11	4.76	52
Ed Stein	14	101.0	7	6	3.74	38
Tom Vickery	14	79.2	6	5	4.07	39

==== Other pitchers ====
Note: G = Games pitched; IP = Innings pitched; W = Wins; L = Losses; ERA = Earned run average; SO = Strikeouts

Player	G	IP	W	L	ERA	SO
George Nicol	3	11.0	0	1	4.91	12

==== Relief pitchers ====
Note: G = Games pitched; W = Wins; L = Losses; SV = Saves; ERA = Earned run average; SO = Strikeouts

Player	G	W	L	SV	ERA	SO
Jimmy Ryan	1	0	0	1	1.59	2
