= 1891 Brooklyn Grooms season =

1891 Brooklyn Grooms
- League: National League
- Ballpark: Washington Park, Eastern Park
- City: Brooklyn, New York
- Record: 61–76 (.445)
- League place: 6th
- Owners: Charles Byrne, Ferdinand Abell, George Chauncey
- President: Charles Byrne
- Manager: John Montgomery Ward

The 1891 Brooklyn Grooms (the name was shortened from "Bridegrooms" this season) started the year with real estate mogul George Chauncey purchasing a controlling interest in the ballclub to join Ferdinand Abell and Charles Byrne in the ownership group. The former owner of the Brooklyn Ward's Wonders in the now defunct Players' League, Chauncey organized a merger of his team with the Grooms, forcing the firing of manager Bill McGunnigle (despite his winning two league championships) and replacing him with former Wonders manager and shortstop, John Montgomery Ward. The new owner also thought the team could generate larger revenue from a bigger stadium, so they decided to move the team to his stadium, Eastern Park. Games would be split between the new facility and old Washington Park during the 1891 season and the team would move full-time in 1892. With all the turmoil, the team fell back into the pack, finishing the season in sixth place.

== Regular season ==
=== Season standings ===
National League
Team	W	L	Pct.	GB	Home	Road
Boston Beaneaters	87	51	.630	—	51‍–‍20	36‍–‍31
Chicago Colts	82	53	.607	3½	43‍–‍22	39‍–‍31
New York Giants	71	61	.538	13	39‍–‍28	32‍–‍33
Philadelphia Phillies	68	69	.496	18½	35‍–‍34	33‍–‍35
Cleveland Spiders	65	74	.468	22½	40‍–‍28	25‍–‍46
Brooklyn Grooms	61	76	.445	25½	41‍–‍31	20‍–‍45
Cincinnati Reds	56	81	.409	30½	26‍–‍41	30‍–‍40
Pittsburgh Pirates	55	80	.407	30½	32‍–‍34	23‍–‍46

=== Record vs. opponents ===
1891 National League record Sources:
Team	BSN	BRO	CHI	CIN	CLE	NYG	PHI	PIT
Boston	—	15–5	7–13	11–9	11–9	15–5–1	12–7	16–3–1
Brooklyn	5–15	—	7–13	9–10	11–9	8–11	12–8	9–10
Chicago	13–7	13–7	—	14–6	16–4	5–13–1	9–10	12–6–1
Cincinnati	9–11	10–9	6–14	—	7–13	5–13–1	9–11	10–10
Cleveland	9–11	9–11	4–16	13–7	—	6–13–1	10–10–1	14–6
New York	5–15–1	11–8	13–5–1	13–5–1	13–6–1	—	9–10	7–12
Philadelphia	7–12	8–12	10–9	11–9	10–10–1	10–9	—	12–8
Pittsburgh	3–16–1	10–9	6–12–1	10–10	6–14	12–7	8–12	—

=== Roster ===
1891 Brooklyn Grooms
Roster
Pitchers: Bob Caruthers; George Hemming; Bert Inks; Tom Lovett; Adonis Terry	Catchers: Con Daily; Tom Daly; Tom Kinslow; Infielders: Jack Burdock; Hub Collins; Bones Ely; Dave Foutz; John O'Brien; George Pinkney; John Ward	Outfielders: Oyster Burns; Dude Esterbrook; Mike Griffin; Darby O'Brien	Manager: John Ward

== Player stats ==
=== Batting ===
==== Starters by position ====
Note: Pos = Position; G = Games played; AB = At bats; R = Runs; H = Hits; Avg. = Batting average; HR = Home runs; RBI = Runs batted in; SB = Stolen bases

Pos	Player	G	AB	R	H	Avg.	HR	RBI	SB
C	Tom Kinslow	61	228	22	54	.237	0	33	3
1B	Dave Foutz	130	521	87	134	.257	2	73	48
2B	Hub Collins	107	435	82	120	.276	3	31	32
3B	George Pinkney	135	501	80	137	.273	2	71	44
SS	John Ward	105	441	85	122	.277	0	39	57
OF	Mike Griffin	134	521	106	139	.267	3	65	65
OF	Oyster Burns	123	470	75	134	.285	4	83	21
OF	Darby O'Brien	103	395	79	100	.253	5	57	31

==== Other batters ====
Note: G = Games played; AB = At bats; R = Runs; H = Hits; Avg. = Batting average; HR = Home runs; RBI = Runs batted in; SB = Stolen bases

Player	G	AB	R	H	Avg.	HR	RBI	SB
Con Daily	60	206	25	66	.320	0	30	7
Tom Daly	58	200	29	50	.250	2	27	7
Bob Caruthers	56	171	24	48	.281	2	23	4
John O'Brien	43	167	22	41	.246	0	26	4
Bones Ely	31	111	9	17	.153	0	11	4
Jack Burdock	3	12	1	1	.083	0	1	0
Dude Esterbrook	3	8	1	3	.375	0	0	0

=== Pitching ===
==== Starting pitchers ====
Note: G = Games pitched; IP = Innings pitched; W = Wins; L = Losses; ERA = Earned run average; BB = Bases on balls; SO = Strikeouts; CG = Complete games

Player	G	GS	IP	W	L	ERA	BB	SO	CG
Tom Lovett	44	43	365.2	23	19	3.69	129	129	39
Bob Caruthers	38	32	297.0	18	14	3.12	107	69	29
George Hemming	27	22	199.2	8	15	4.96	84	84	19
Adonis Terry	25	22	194.0	6	16	4.22	80	65	18
Bert Inks	13	13	96.1	3	10	4.02	43	47	11
Dave Foutz	6	5	52.0	3	2	3.29	16	14	5
