= Walter Plock =

American baseball player (1869–1900)

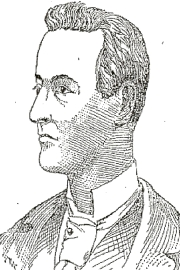
- Center fielder
- Born: July 2, 1869; Philadelphia, Pennsylvania, US
- Died: April 28, 1900 (aged 30); Richmond, Virginia, US
- Batted: Unknown Threw: Unknown

MLB debut
- August 21, 1891, for the Philadelphia Phillies

Last MLB appearance
- August 22, 1891, for the Philadelphia Phillies

MLB statistics
- Batting average: .400
- Home runs: 0
- RBIs: 0
- Stats at Baseball Reference

Teams
- Philadelphia Phillies (1891)

Walter S. Plock (July 2, 1869 – April 28, 1900) was an American professional baseball player, who appeared in two games for the 1891 Philadelphia Phillies. In six at bats, he collected two hits, and scored two runs. In addition to his short stint as a Major League Baseball player, he played in six minor league seasons. Plock was born in Philadelphia, Pennsylvania, and died at the age of 30 in Richmond, Virginia, when he fell off a hoisting engine while building a bridge.
