= John Kiley (baseball) =

American baseball player (1859–1940)

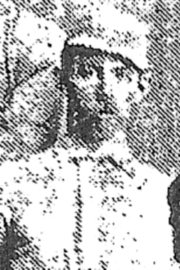
- Outfielder
- Born: July 1, 1859; Dedham, Massachusetts, U.S.
- Died: December 18, 1940 (aged 81); Norwood, Massachusetts, U.S.
- Batted: Left Threw: Left

MLB debut
- May 1, 1884, for the Washington Nationals (AA)

Last MLB appearance
- May 7, 1891, for the Boston Beaneaters

MLB statistics
- Batting average: .214
- Hits: 14
- Win–loss record: 0-1
- Stats at Baseball Reference

Teams
- Washington Nationals (AA) (1884); Boston Beaneaters (1891)

John Frederick Kiley (July 1, 1859 – December 18, 1940) was an American Major League Baseball outfielder and pitcher, born in Dedham, Massachusetts, who played parts of two seasons in the majors. In 1884, he played 14 games in the outfield for the Washington Nationals of the American Association. He did not appear again in the majors until 1891, when he started one game on May 7 for the Boston Beaneaters, which he lost. He died in Norwood, Massachusetts.

== Sources ==
- Career statistics from Baseball Reference · Baseball Reference (Minors) · Retrosheet · Baseball Almanac
