= Harry Morelock =

American baseball player (1869–1949)

- Shortstop
- Born: November 1869; Philadelphia, Pennsylvania, U.S.
- Died: April 21, 1949 (aged 79); Atlantic City, New Jersey, U.S.
- Batted: Unknown Threw: Unknown

MLB debut
- August 21, 1891, for the Philadelphia Phillies

Last MLB appearance
- August 9, 1892, for the Philadelphia Phillies

MLB statistics
- Batting average: .059
- Hits: 1
- Runs: 1
- Home runs: 0
- Runs batted in: 0
- Stats at Baseball Reference

Teams
- Philadelphia Phillies (1891–1892)

A. Harry Morelock (November 1869 – April 21, 1949) was a 19th-century American Major League Baseball player. He played shortstop for the 1891–1892 Philadelphia Phillies of the National League. He remained active in the Minor leagues through 1895.
