= Bill Bowman (baseball) =

American baseball player (1867–1944)

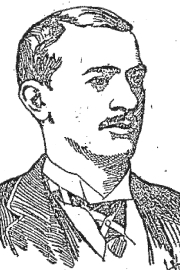
- Catcher
- Born: January 23, 1867; Chicago, Illinois, U.S.
- Died: December 28, 1944 (aged 77); Chicago, Illinois, U.S.

MLB debut
- June 18, 1891, for the Chicago Colts

Last MLB appearance
- August 5, 1891, for the Chicago Colts

MLB statistics
- Fielding percentage: .915
- Putouts: 41
- Stats at Baseball Reference

Teams
- Chicago Colts (1891)

William George Bowman (January 23, 1867 in Chicago – December 28, 1944 in Chicago) was an American catcher in Major League Baseball for the Chicago Colts (today known as the Chicago Cubs) in 1891. Bowman appeared in 15 games for the Colts, batting just .089 (4-for-45) with one double and five RBI. He died on April 6, 1944, in Arlington Heights, Illinois.
