= Dan Lally =

American baseball player (1867–1936)

- Outfielder
- Born: August 12, 1867; Jersey City, New Jersey, U.S.
- Died: April 14, 1936 (aged 68); Milwaukee, Wisconsin, U.S.
- Batted: Left Threw: Right

MLB debut
- August 19, 1891, for the Pittsburgh Pirates

Last MLB appearance
- September 19, 1897, for the St. Louis Browns

MLB statistics
- Batting average: .267
- Home runs: 3
- Runs batted in: 58
- Stats at Baseball Reference

Teams
- Pittsburgh Pirates (1891); St. Louis Browns (1897)

Daniel J. Lally (August 12, 1867 – April 14, 1936) was an American Major League Baseball outfielder. He played for the 1891 Pittsburgh Pirates and 1897 St. Louis Browns of the National League. In addition to his two brief appearances in the Majors, he had an extensive minor league baseball career that lasted from 1887 through 1905.

He is sometimes confused with John Lally who was an umpire in the South Atlantic League in 1907, but there is no record that Dan ever served as an umpire. Dan spent most of his later years in various institutions, including the Wisconsin State Asylum.
