= John Schultz (pitcher) =

American baseball player

- Pitcher
- Born: Unknown; Burlington, New Jersey, U.S.
- Died: Unknown
- Batted: Unknown Threw: Unknown

MLB debut
- May 6, 1891, for the Philadelphia Phillies

Last MLB appearance
- June 11, 1891, for the Philadelphia Phillies

MLB statistics
- Win–loss record: 0–1
- Earned run average: 6.60
- Strikeouts: 4
- Stats at Baseball Reference

Teams
- Philadelphia Phillies (1891)

John F. Schultz was an American professional baseball player in Major League Baseball during the 19th century. As a pitcher, Schultz played one season for the Philadelphia Phillies of the National League. He stood 6 feet (180 cm) tall and weighed 165 pounds (75 kg).

== Early life ==
Schultz was born in Burlington, New Jersey, but his date of birth is unknown.

== 1891 season ==
The Philadelphia Phillies signed Schultz to a contract prior to the 1891 season; he began play with the Phillies on May 6, pitching against the Brooklyn Grooms in Philadelphia's 13th game of the season. On May 27, he allowed the only home run of his career to cleanup hitter Bug Holliday of the Cincinnati Reds, a two-run shot in the bottom of the ninth inning. He made one start during that year in a 2–1 loss at Baker Bowl against the Reds, and finished the other five games in which he appeared.

For the season, Schultz compiled an 0–1 record, pitching alongside such Phillies as 20-game winners Kid Gleason and Duke Esper. He allowed 15 runs, 11 of them earned, in 15 innings pitched to total a 6.60 earned run average. He struck out four batters while walking eleven, a ratio of 0.36. At the plate, Schultz made six plate appearances, collecting six at-bats, in which he notched one hit—a double—and struck out twice. In his appearances on base, he also scored three runs. As a fielder, he had one chance for a putout, recording an assist and making no errors for a fielding percentage of 1.000; he recorded a range factor of 0.60, averaging 0.17 per game.

=== Career ===
Schultz had a contemporary at catcher who shared his name: John Schultz, sometimes spelled "Schulze", of the St. Louis Browns. Both men played only during the 1891 season.
