= Jim Curtiss =

American baseball player (1861–1945)

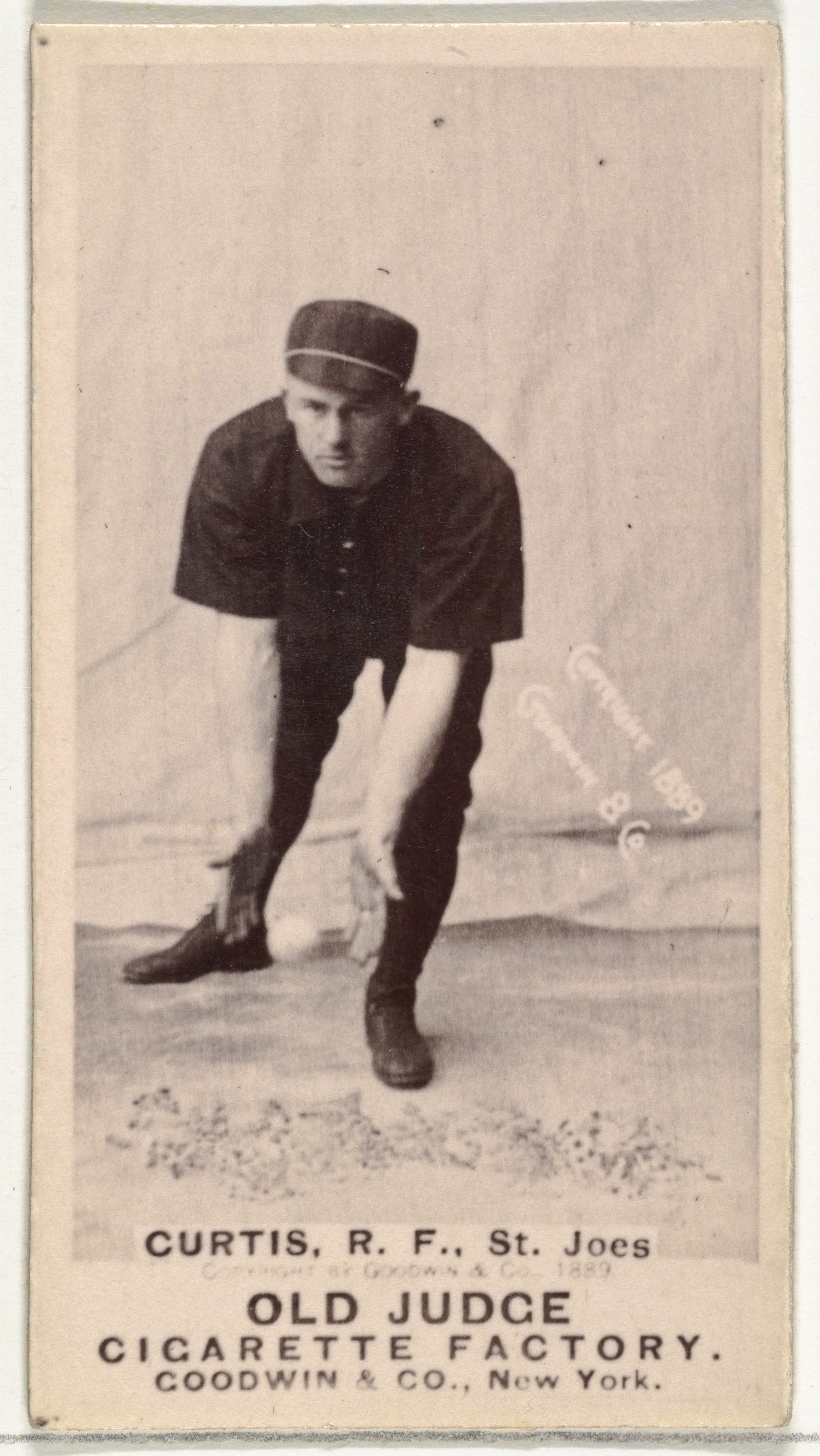
- Outfielder
- Born: December 27, 1861; Coldwater, Michigan, U.S.
- Died: February 14, 1945 (aged 83); North Adams, Massachusetts, U.S.
- Batted: Left Threw: Left

MLB debut
- July 15, 1891, for the Cincinnati Reds

Last MLB appearance
- September 22, 1891, for the Washington Statesmen

MLB statistics
- Batting average: .261
- Hits: 55
- Runs batted in: 25
- Stats at Baseball Reference

Teams
- Cincinnati Reds (1891); Washington Statesmen (1891)

Ervin Duane Curtiss (December 27, 1861 – February 14, 1945) was an American professional baseball player who played outfield in Major League Baseball in 1891.
