= Jim Sullivan (1890s pitcher) =

American baseball player (1867–1901)

- Pitcher
- Born: April 25, 1867; Charlestown, Massachusetts, U.S.
- Died: November 29, 1901 (aged 34); Roxbury, Massachusetts, U.S.
- Batted: Right Threw: Right

MLB debut
- April 22, 1891, for the Boston Beaneaters

Last MLB appearance
- May 6, 1898, for the Boston Beaneaters

MLB statistics
- Win–loss record: 26–28
- Strikeouts: 98
- Earned run average: 4.53
- Stats at Baseball Reference

Teams
- Boston Beaneaters (1891); Columbus Solons (1891); Boston Beaneaters (1895–1898)

Daniel James Sullivan (April 25, 1867 – November 29, 1901) was an American professional baseball pitcher in Major League Baseball from 1891 to 1898. He played for the Columbus Solons and Boston Beaneaters.

Sullivan started his baseball career in 1891. He had short stints in the National League, American Association, and Eastern Association, but did not pitch particularly well in any of them. From 1892 to 1894, he pitched for Providence of the Eastern League, and then he was drafted by the Boston Beaneaters before the 1895 season.

Sullivan pitched well for the Beaneaters teams, including the pennant winners of 1897; however, he was not one of their top pitchers. In 1898, he started off slowly and was released in May.

In August 1898, Sullivan rejoined his previous club, Providence.
