= John Shearon =

American baseball player (1871–1932)

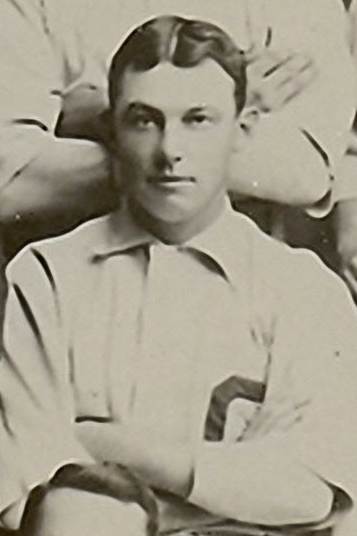
- Outfielder
- Born: 1871; Pennsylvania, U.S.
- Died: February 12, 1932 (aged 60–61); Chicago, Illinois, U.S.
- Batted: Unknown Threw: Unknown

MLB debut
- July 28, 1891, for the Cleveland Spiders

Last MLB appearance
- May 9, 1896, for the Cleveland Spiders

MLB statistics
- Batting average: .218
- Home runs: 0
- Runs batted in: 16
- Stats at Baseball Reference

Teams
- Cleveland Spiders (1891, 1896)

John Shearon (1871 – February 12, 1932) was an American Major League Baseball outfielder. He played for the Cleveland Spiders of the National League in 1891 and 1896. He continued playing in the minor leagues until 1903.
