= John Newell (baseball) =

American baseball player (1868–1919)

- Third baseman
- Born: January 14, 1868; Wilmington, Delaware, U.S.
- Died: January 23, 1919 (aged 51); Wilmington, Delaware, U.S.
- Batted: Right Threw: Left

MLB debut
- July 22, 1891, for the Pittsburgh Pirates

Last MLB appearance
- August 1, 1891, for the Pittsburgh Pirates

MLB statistics
- Batting average: .111
- Home runs: 0
- Runs batted in: 2
- Stats at Baseball Reference

Teams
- Pittsburgh Pirates (1891)

John A. Newell (January 14, 1868 – January 23, 1919) was an American Major League Baseball infielder. He played in five games for the 1891 Pittsburgh Pirates of the National League. His career continued in the minor leagues through 1898.
