= Phil Saylor =

American baseball and football player (1871–1937)

- Pitcher
- Born: January 2, 1871; Van Wert, Ohio, US
- Died: July 23, 1937 (aged 66); West Alexandria, Ohio, US
- Batted: Unknown Threw: Left

MLB debut
- July 11, 1891, for the Philadelphia Phillies

Last MLB appearance
- July 11, 1891, for the Philadelphia Phillies

MLB statistics
- Win–loss record: 0–0
- Earned run average: 6.00
- Strikeouts: 0
- Stats at Baseball Reference

Teams
- Philadelphia Phillies (1891)

Philip Andrew Saylor (January 2, 1871 – July 23, 1937), nicknamed "Lefty", was an American football quarterback for Ohio Wesleyan University and college baseball pitcher best remembered for a "cup of coffee" appearance with the Philadelphia Phillies.

== Early life ==
Saylor was born in 1871 in Van Wert, Ohio. He became a left-handed pitcher for the Ohio Wesleyan baseball team, where he acquired the nickname "Lefty." At the end of Saylor's senior year the OWU students put together an American football team, and Saylor was named the quarterback. His first and only appearance with the team was in the first game for the OWU football program, a 20–14 loss to the Ohio State University team on May 3, 1890. The game was also the first for the Ohio State squad.

== Career ==
After graduating from Ohio Wesleyan, Saylor focused on his baseball career. On July 11, 1891, he made his only appearance with the Phillies, three innings of relief pitching against the Pittsburgh Pirates. Saylor gave up two hits and two runs in an 11–0 loss, including one home run. Saylor died in 1937 in West Alexandria, Ohio.
