= Joe Gormley (baseball) =

American baseball player (1866–1950)

- Pitcher
- Born: December 20, 1866; Summit Hill, Pennsylvania, U.S.
- Died: July 2, 1950 (aged 83); Summit Hill, Pennsylvania, U.S.
- Batted: Left Threw: Left

MLB debut
- June 16, 1891, for the Philadelphia Phillies

Last MLB appearance
- June 16, 1891, for the Philadelphia Phillies

MLB statistics
- Win–loss record: 0–1
- Earned run average: 5.63
- Strikeouts: 2
- Stats at Baseball Reference

Teams
- Philadelphia Phillies (1891)

Joseph Gormley (December 20, 1866 – July 2, 1950) was an American professional baseball player for the 1891 Philadelphia Phillies.
