= Billy Graulich =

American baseball player (1868–1948)

- Catcher / First baseman
- Born: July 24, 1868; Philadelphia, Pennsylvania
- Died: August 12, 1948 (aged 80); Philadelphia, Pennsylvania
- Batted: Unknown Threw: Unknown

MLB debut
- September 17, 1891, for the Philadelphia Phillies

Last appearance
- September 23, 1891, for the Philadelphia Phillies

MLB statistics
- Batting average: .308
- Home runs: 0
- Runs batted in: 3
- Stats at Baseball Reference

Teams
- Philadelphia Phillies (1891)

William Graulich (July 24, 1868 – August 12, 1948) was an American catcher and first baseman in Major League Baseball who played for the Philadelphia Phillies in its 1891 season. He was born in Philadelphia, Pennsylvania.

Graulich made six game appearances for the Phillies in his only major league season, getting eight hits in 26 at bats for a .308 average.

He died in 1948 in his hometown of Philadelphia at the age of 80.
