= Bill Kling (baseball) =

American baseball player (1867–1934)

- Pitcher
- Born: January 14, 1867; Kansas City, Missouri, U.S.
- Died: August 26, 1934 (aged 67); Kansas City, Missouri, U.S.
- Batted: Left Threw: Right

MLB debut
- August 13, 1891, for the Philadelphia Phillies

Last MLB appearance
- April 20, 1895, for the Louisville Colonels

MLB statistics
- Win–loss record: 4–4
- Earned run average: 5.17
- Strikeouts: 33
- Stats at Baseball Reference

Teams
- Philadelphia Phillies (1891); Baltimore Orioles (1892); Louisville Colonels (1895)

William Kling (January 14, 1867 – August 26, 1934) was an American professional baseball player who played from 1891 to 1895.

His brother, Johnny Kling, also played professional baseball.
