= Henry Killeen =

American baseball player (1872–1916)

- Pitcher
- Born: May 1872; Troy, New York, U.S.
- Died: October 16, 1916 (aged 44); Waterbury, Connecticut, U.S.
- Batted: Unknown Threw: Unknown

MLB debut
- September 11, 1891, for the Cleveland Spiders

Last MLB appearance
- September 11, 1891, for the Cleveland Spiders

MLB statistics
- Win–loss record: 0-1
- Earned run average: 6.23
- Strikeouts: 3
- Stats at Baseball Reference

Teams
- Cleveland Spiders (1891)

Henry F. Killeen (May 1872 – October 16, 1916) was an American starting pitcher in Major League Baseball. He pitched in one game for the Cleveland Spiders of the National League on September 11, 1891. He remained active in the minor leagues through 1899.
