= Ed Spurney =

American baseball player (1872–1932)

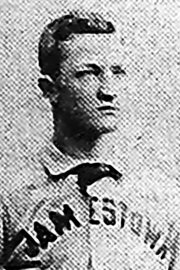
- Shortstop
- Born: January 9, 1872; Cleveland, Ohio, U.S.
- Died: October 11, 1932 (aged 60); Cleveland, Ohio, U.S.
- Batted: Unknown Threw: Unknown

MLB debut
- June 26, 1891, for the Pittsburgh Pirates

Last MLB appearance
- June 29, 1891, for the Pittsburgh Pirates

MLB statistics
- Batting average: .286
- Home runs: 0
- Runs batted in: 0
- Stats at Baseball Reference

Teams
- Pittsburgh Pirates (1891)

Edward Frederick Spurney (January 9, 1872 – October 11, 1932) was an American Major League Baseball shortstop. He played in three games for the 1891 Pittsburgh Pirates of the National League.

He married Anna A. Suchy, and they had one son, Howard. He died in Cleveland, Ohio, on August 11, 1932, and was buried at Woodland Cemetery in the city.
