= Pop Corkhill =

American baseball player (1858–1921)

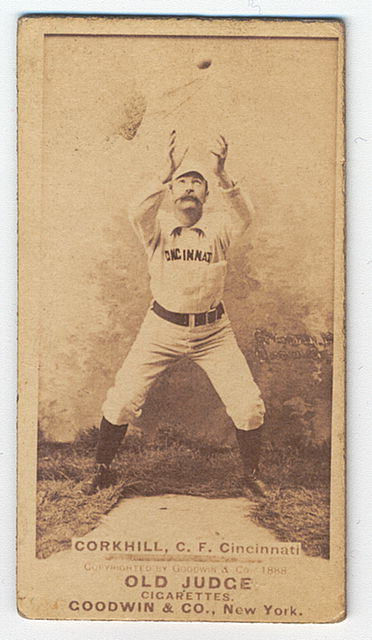
- Outfielder
- Born: April 11, 1858; Parkesburg, Pennsylvania, U.S.
- Died: April 4, 1921 (aged 62); Pennsauken, New Jersey, U.S.
- Batted: Left Threw: Right

MLB debut
- May 1, 1883, for the Cincinnati Red Stockings

Last MLB appearance
- July 13, 1892, for the Pittsburgh Pirates

MLB statistics
- Batting average: .254
- Hits: 1,120
- Runs: 650
- Stats at Baseball Reference

Teams
- Cincinnati Red Stockings (1883–1888); Brooklyn Bridegrooms (1888–1890); Philadelphia Athletics (1891); Cincinnati Reds (1891); Pittsburgh Pirates (1891–1892)

John Stewart "Pop" Corkhill (April 11, 1858 – April 4, 1921) was an American professional baseball player. He played in Major League Baseball as an outfielder from 1883 to 1892. Corkhill excelled as a defensive player, winning five fielding titles in his career.

== Biography ==
Corkhill was born in Parkesburg, Pennsylvania on April 11, 1858. He began his Major League career in the American Association with the Cincinnati Reds in 1883. He served as the Reds' right fielder for four seasons, leading American Association outfielders in fielding twice. In 1887, he moved to center field and played there regularly for two seasons, winning two more fielding titles. As a batter, Corkhill had a knack for driving in runs, finishing 2nd in the league in RBI in 1886. He also pitched on multiple occasions, serving as a relief pitcher at a time when relievers were not commonplace.

Corkhill finished the 1888 season with the Brooklyn Bridegrooms after the team purchased his contract from Cincinnati. He played two seasons as Brooklyn's center fielder, and earned two league championships with the club, an AA championship in 1889 and a National League championship in 1890 after the club switched leagues.

Corkhill returned to the American Association in 1891 and began the year with the Philadelphia Athletics. He left the team in mid-season and returned to the NL to finish the year, playing a single game with the Reds before joining the Pittsburgh Pirates. He played for parts of two seasons with the Pirates, before retiring after being hit in the head by a pitch from Ed Crane.

Corkhill died after an operation in Pennsauken, New Jersey on April 4, 1921.
