= Marty Sullivan =

American baseball player (1862–1894)

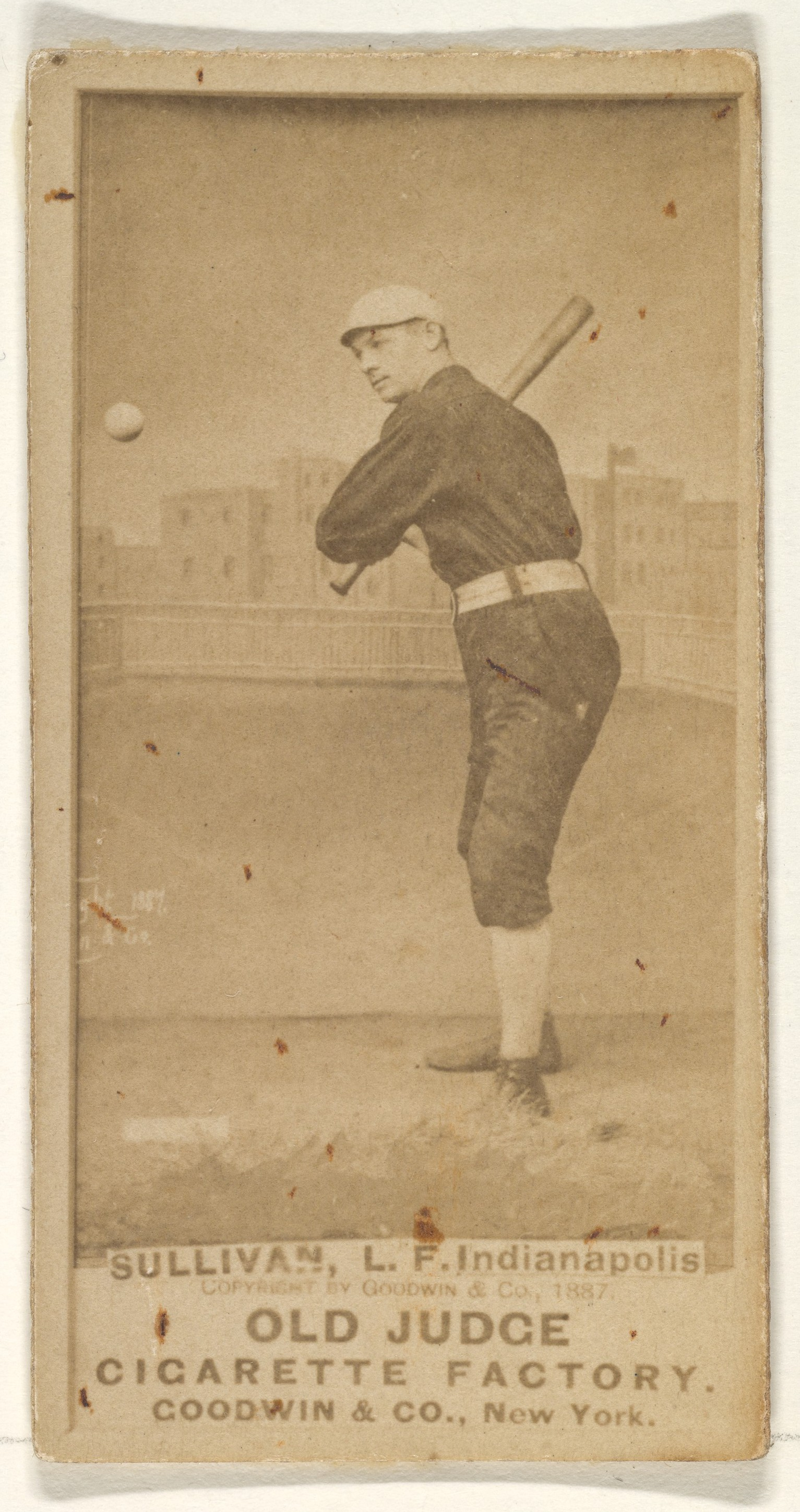
- Outfielder
- Born: October 2, 1862; Lowell, Massachusetts, U.S.
- Died: January 6, 1894 (aged 31); Lowell, Massachusetts, U.S.
- Batted: Right Threw: Right

MLB debut
- April 30, 1887, for the Chicago White Stockings

Last MLB appearance
- August 17, 1891, for the Cleveland Spiders

MLB statistics
- Batting average: .273
- Home runs: 26
- Runs batted in: 220
- Stats at Baseball Reference

Teams
- Chicago White Stockings (1887–88); Indianapolis Hoosiers (1889); Boston Beaneaters (1890–91); Cleveland Spiders (1891)

Martin C. Sullivan (October 2, 1862 in Lowell, Massachusetts – January 6, 1894 in Lowell, Massachusetts), was an American Major League Baseball outfielder. He played all or part of five seasons in the majors, from 1887-1891, for the Cleveland Spiders, Chicago White Stockings, Boston Beaneaters, and Indianapolis Hoosiers.
