= Jerry Denny =

American baseball player (1859–1927)

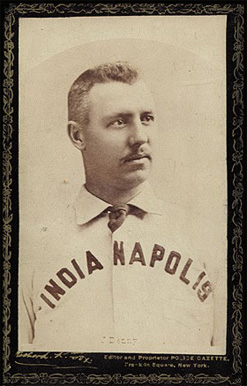
- 1889 baseball card of Denny
- Third baseman
- Born: March 16, 1859; New York City, U.S.
- Died: August 16, 1927 (aged 68); Houston, Texas, U.S.
- Batted: Right Threw: Both

MLB debut
- May 2, 1881, for the Providence Grays

Last MLB appearance
- July 10, 1894, for the Louisville Colonels

MLB statistics
- Batting average: .260
- Hits: 1,286
- Runs batted in: 667
- Stats at Baseball Reference

Teams
- Providence Grays (1881–1885); St. Louis Maroons (1886); Indianapolis Hoosiers (1887–1889); New York Giants (1890–1891); Cleveland Spiders (1891); Philadelphia Phillies (1891); Louisville Colonels (1893–1894)

Career highlights and awards
- National League pennant: 1884

Jeremiah Dennis Denny (born Jeremiah Dennis Eldridge; March 16, 1859 – August 16, 1927) was an American third baseman in Major League Baseball. He played for the Providence Grays (1881–1885), St. Louis Maroons (1886), Indianapolis Hoosiers (1888–1889), New York Giants (1890–1891), Cleveland Spiders (1891), Philadelphia Phillies (1891), and Louisville Colonels (1893–1894). He also played 86 games at shortstop in six seasons.

After leaving the major leagues, Denny continued playing minor league baseball until 1902. He was the last major league position player (non-pitcher) to play his entire career on the diamond without wearing a fielding glove.

== Name ==
Eldridge attended St. Mary's College, Phoenix, Arizona, in the late 1870s, and wanted to play semi-professional baseball during the summer months, when he wasn't playing for the college as an amateur. He used the pseudonym "Jerry Denny" to hide his professional play from the college.

== Professional achievements ==
Denny holds the major league record for most chances by a third baseman in a single game, handling 16 chances during an 18-inning match on August 17, 1882.

In 1884, Denny helped the National League champion Grays defeat the New York Metropolitans of the American Association in the major leagues' first post-season championship match-up, hitting the first postseason home run ever in game 2. That season, he was the Grays' leader in home runs (six, and one in the championship series) and runs batted in (59), and second in extra-base hits (37).

Denny's career totals are 1,237 games, 4,946 at bats, 714 runs, 1,286 hits, 238 doubles, 76 triples, 74 home runs, 667 RBI, 130 stolen bases, 173 walks, and a batting average of .260.

"Denny was a rarity among power-hitters in that he drew very few walks, a factor that led to his offensive value being overrated throughout his career," wrote baseball historian Craig Wright, who explained: "[Denny's] batting averages were very normal for a position player of his era, but he walked so little that when he retired he had the second worst on-base percentage (.287) among major leaguers with 5000 plate appearances."

== Unconventional fielding technique ==
At the time Denny began his professional career, fielding gloves had not yet become standard equipment, other than padded mitts for catchers and first basemen. Fielding gloves gradually gained acceptance between 1885 and the mid-1890s, but Denny refused to adapt. He was one of the few ambidextrous major league players; although he threw primarily with his right arm, he could also toss with his left. This gave him a defensive advantage at his customary field position—in ranging to his left on a ground ball, if he saw a play at second base, instead of having to transfer the ball to his right hand while pivoting and repositioning his body (as third basemen would customarily do), Denny could dispatch the ball to second with his left hand. This skill contributed to his refusal to wear a glove in the field, long after most players considered gloves essential.

== See also ==
- List of Major League Baseball single-game hits leaders
