= Ed Mayer (third baseman) =

American baseball player (1865–1946)

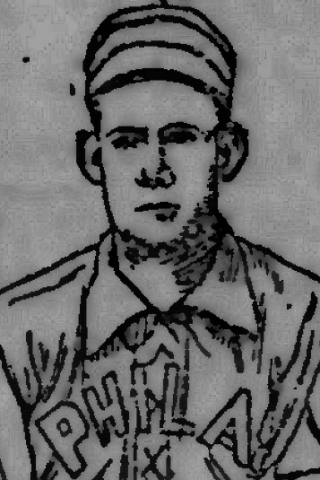
- Third baseman
- Born: August 16, 1865; Marshall, Illinois, U.S.
- Died: May 15, 1946 (aged 80); Chicago, Illinois, U.S.
- Batted: unknown Threw: unknown

MLB debut
- April 19, 1890, for the Philadelphia Phillies

Last MLB appearance
- September 30, 1891, for the Philadelphia Phillies

MLB statistics
- Batting average: .222
- Home runs: 1
- Runs batted in: 101
- Stats at Baseball Reference

Teams
- Philadelphia Phillies (1890–1891)

Edward H. Mayer (August 16, 1865 – May 15, 1946) was an American third baseman in Major League Baseball for the Philadelphia Phillies.

== Biography ==
Mayer was born in Marshall, Illinois, and played for the Philadelphia Phillies from 1890 to 1891. He died in Chicago, Illinois in 1946, and is interred in Mount Carmel Cemetery in Chicago.
